= Green Bay Packers draft picks (1970–present) =

The Green Bay Packers are a professional American football team based in Green Bay, Wisconsin. The Packers have competed in the National Football League (NFL) since 1921, two years after their original founding by Curly Lambeau and George Whitney Calhoun. They are members of the North Division of the National Football Conference (NFC) and play their home games at Lambeau Field in central Wisconsin.

The NFL draft, officially known as the "NFL Annual Player Selection Meeting", is an annual event which serves as the league's most common source of player recruitment. The draft order is determined based on the previous season's standings; the teams with the worst win–loss records receive the earliest picks. Teams that qualified for the NFL playoffs select after non-qualifiers, and their order depends on how far they advanced, using their regular season record as a tie-breaker. The final two selections in the first round are reserved for the Super Bowl runner-up and champion. Draft picks are tradable and players or other picks can be acquired with them.

In 1970, the Packers took part in the first modern NFL draft after the completion of the AFL–NFL merger. With the second pick of the first round of that draft, Mike McCoy, a defensive tackle out of Notre Dame, became the Packers' first modern draft selection. In addition to the annual draft, the Packers participated in the 1984 NFL supplemental draft. This supplemental draft occurred after the formation of the United States Football League (USFL) with the primary purpose of selecting players that had already signed with a USFL team in a separate process from the annual draft. The Canadian Football League (CFL) was also included in this supplemental draft. In addition to the 1984 supplemental draft, since 1977 the NFL has hosted an annual supplemental draft for players who had circumstances affect their eligibility for the NFL draft. The Packers have only selected a player once in a supplemental draft, taking Mike Wahle in the second round in 1998. Since 1970, three players drafted by the Packers have been inducted into the Pro Football Hall of Fame: James Lofton, LeRoy Butler, and Sterling Sharpe. Lofton, Butler, and Sharpe, along with 32 other Packers draftees, have been inducted into the Green Bay Packers Hall of Fame. The Packers have taken part in every modern NFL draft since 1970, most recently in the 2026 NFL draft, where they drafted 6 players.

== Key ==
Key
^{#}	Inducted into the Green Bay Packers Hall of Fame
†	Inducted into the Pro Football Hall of Fame
‡	Inducted into the Green Bay Packers Hall of Fame and Pro Football Hall of Fame

== 1970 draft ==
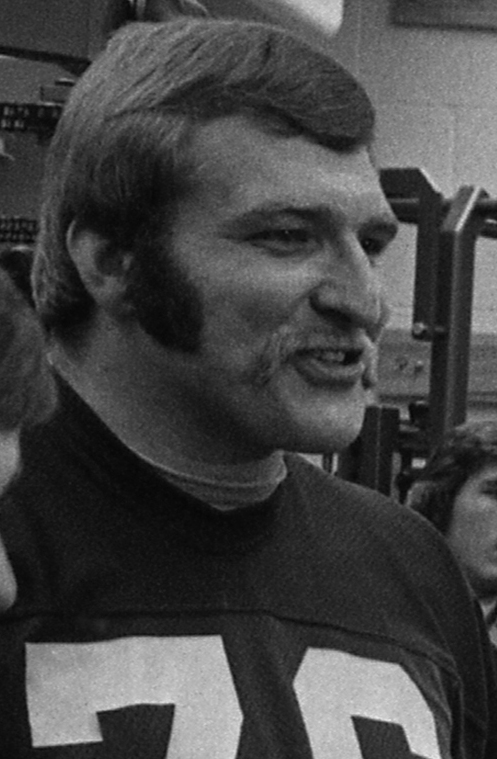
Mike McCoy was one of the Packers' first-round selections in the 1970 draft.

Green Bay Packers draft selections in 1970Source: Pro-Football-Reference.com
Round	Pick #	Overall	Name	Position (Note: Position reflects the source for each table (Pro-Football-Reference.com) and may not be representative of a player's college position or current position.)	College
1	2	2	Mike McCoy	Defensive tackle	Notre Dame
1	16	16	Rich McGeorge	Tight end	Elon
2	15	41	Al Matthews	Defensive back	Texas A&I
3	16	68	Jim Carter	Linebacker	Minnesota
4	15	93	Ken Ellis ^{#}	Defensive back	Southern
4	18	96	Skip Butler	Placekicker	Texas–Arlington
5	16	120	Cecil Pryor	Defensive end	Michigan
6	15	145	Ervin Hunt	Defensive back	Fresno St.
7	16	172	Cleo Walker	Linebacker	Louisville
8	15	197	Tim Mjos	Running back	North Dakota St.
9	16	224	Bob Reinhard	Guard	Stanford
10	14	248	Russ Melby	Defensive tackle	Weber St.
10	17	251	Frank Patrick	Quarterback	Nebraska
11	16	276	Dan Hook	Linebacker	Humboldt St.
12	14	300	Frank Foreman	Wide receiver	Michigan St.
13	16	328	Dave Smith	Running back	Utah
14	15	353	Bob Lints	Guard	Eastern Michigan
15	16	380	Mike Carter	Wide receiver	Sacramento St.
16	15	405	Jim Heacock	Defensive back	Muskingum
17	16	432	Larry Krause	Running back	St. Norbert

== 1971 draft ==
Green Bay Packers draft selections in 1971Source: Pro-Football-Reference.com
Round	Pick #	Overall	Name	Position	College
1	9	9	John Brockington ^{#}	Running back	Ohio St.
2	20	46	Virgil Robinson	Running back	Grambling St.
3	10	62	Charlie Hall	Defensive back	Pittsburgh
5	12	116	Donnell Smith	Defensive end	Southern
5	20	124	Jim Stillwagon	Linebacker	Ohio St.
6	10	140	Scott Hunter	Quarterback	Alabama
7	12	168	Dave Davis	Wide receiver	Tennessee St.
7	19	175	James Johnson	Wide receiver	Bishop
8	11	193	Win Headley	Center	Wake Forest
9	10	218	Barry Mayer	Running back	Minnesota
10	12	246	Kevin Hunt	Tackle	Doane
11	11	271	John Lanier	Running back	Parsons
12	10	296	Greg Hendren	Guard	California
13	12	324	Jack Martin	Running back	Angelo St.
14	10	348	LeRoy Spears	Defensive end	Moorhead St.
15	10	374	Len Garrett	Tight end	NM Highlands
16	12	402	Jack O'Donnell	Guard	Central Oklahoma
17	11	427	Monty Johnson	Defensive back	Oklahoma

== 1972 draft ==
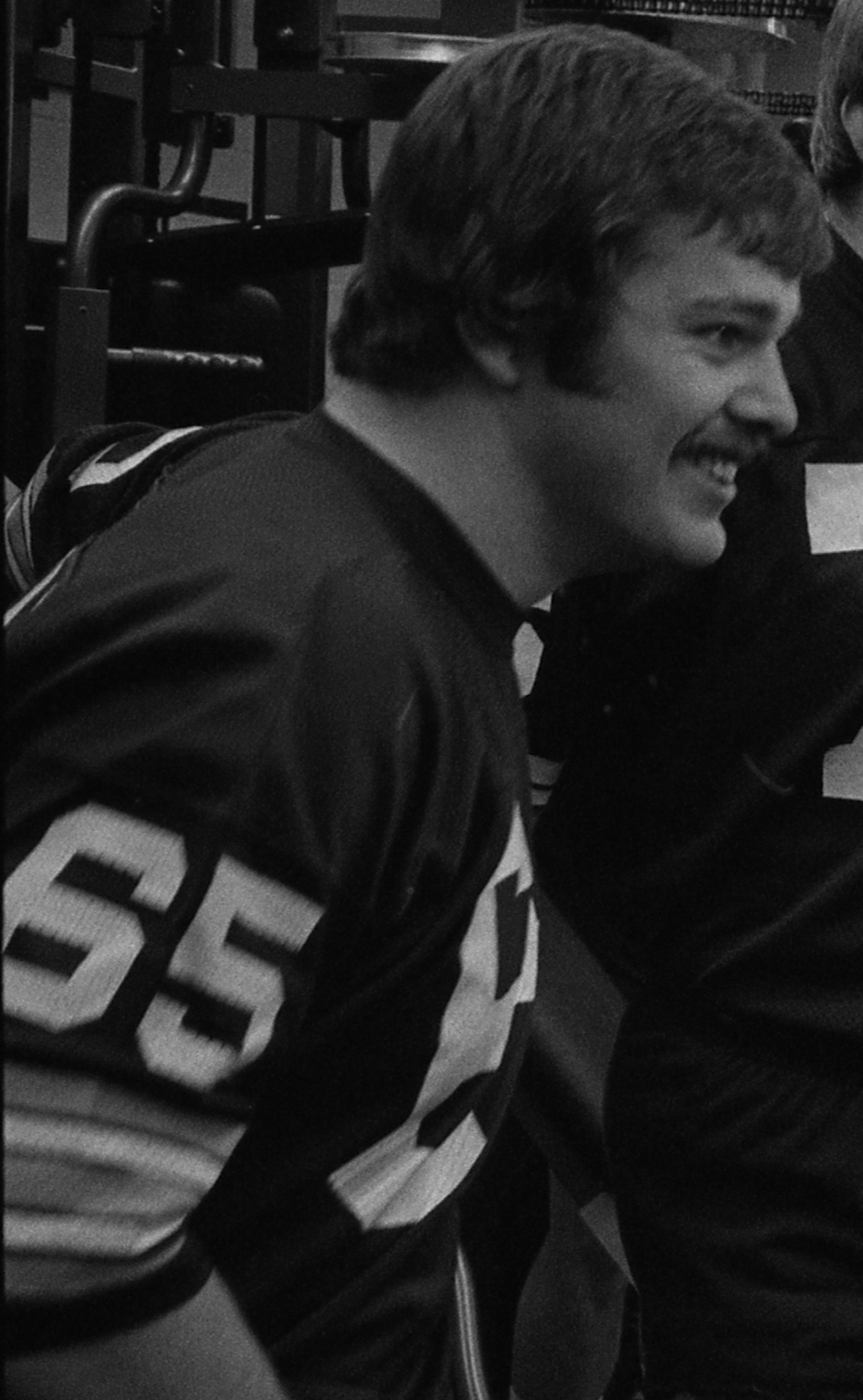
Keith Wortman was the Packers' tenth-round selection in the 1972 draft.

Green Bay Packers draft selections in 1972Source: Pro-Football-Reference.com
Round	Pick #	Overall	Name	Position	College
1	7	7	Willie Buchanon ^{#}	Defensive back	San Diego St.
1	11	11	Jerry Tagge	Quarterback	Nebraska
2	8	34	Chester Marcol ^{#}	Placekicker	Hillsdale
4	8	86	Eric Patton	Linebacker	Notre Dame
6	8	138	Nathaniel Ross	Defensive back	Bethune-Cookman
6	12	142	Dave Pureifory	Defensive end	Eastern Michigan
6	17	147	Bob Hudson	Running back	NE State (OK)
7	7	163	Bill Bushong	Defensive tackle	Kentucky
8	8	190	Leland Glass	Wide receiver	Oregon
10	8	242	Keith Wortman	Guard	Nebraska
11	6	266	David Bailey	Wide receiver	Alabama
12	8	294	Mike Rich	Running back	Florida
13	7	319	Jesse Lakes	Running back	Central Michigan
14	8	346	Larry Hefner	Linebacker	Clemson
15	7	371	Rick Thone	Wide receiver	Arkansas Tech
16	8	398	Charles Burrell	Defensive tackle	Arkansas-Pine Bluff

== 1973 draft ==
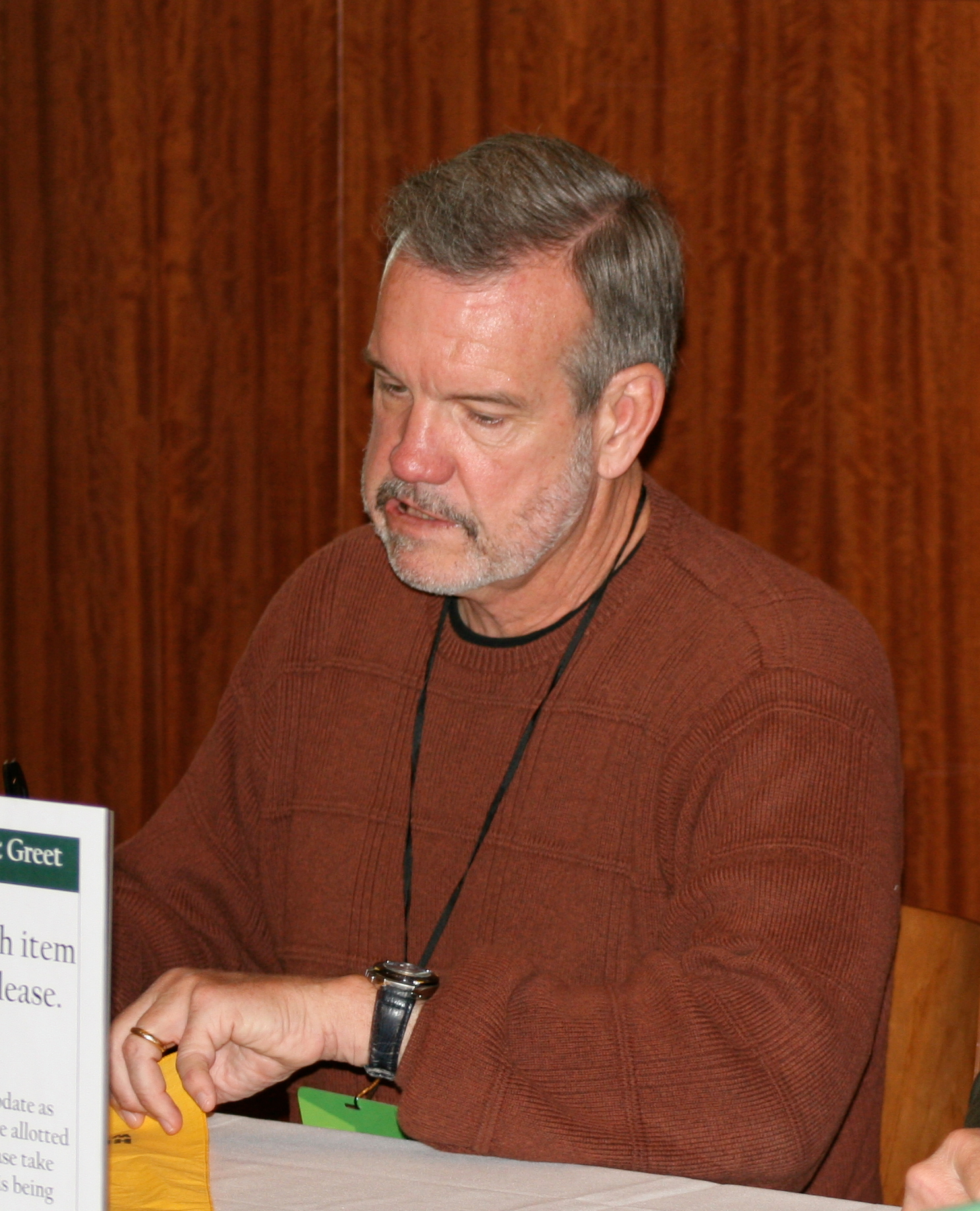
Larry McCarren, seen here in 2007, was the Packers' twelfth-round draft pick in the 1973 draft.

Green Bay Packers draft selections in 1973Source: Pro-Football-Reference.com
Round	Pick #	Overall	Name	Position	College
1	21	21	Barry Smith	Wide receiver	Florida St.
3	22	74	Tom MacLeod	Linebacker	Minnesota
6	22	152	Tom Toner	Linebacker	Idaho St.
7	21	177	John Muller	Tackle	Iowa
8	20	202	Hise Austin	Defensive back	Prairie View A&M
9	22	230	Rick Brown	Linebacker	South Carolina
10	21	255	Larry Allen	Linebacker	Illinois
11	20	280	Phil Engle	Defensive tackle	South Dakota St.
12	22	308	Larry McCarren ^{#}	Center	Illinois
13	21	333	Tim Alderson	Defensive back	Minnesota
14	20	358	James Anderson	Defensive tackle	Northwestern
15	22	386	Reggie Echols	Wide receiver	UCLA
16	21	411	Keith Pretty	Tight end	Western Michigan
17	20	436	Harold Sampson	Defensive tackle	Southern

== 1974 draft ==
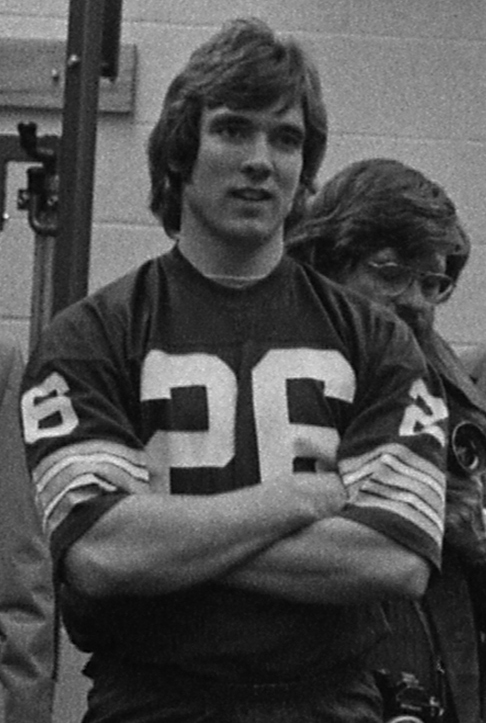
Eric Torkelson was the Packers' eleventh-round selection in the 1974 draft

Green Bay Packers draft selections in 1974Source: Pro-Football-Reference.com
Round	Pick #	Overall	Name	Position	College
1	12	12	Barty Smith	Running back	Richmond
5	12	116	Steve Odom	Wide receiver	Utah
6	4	134	Don Woods	Running back	New Mexico
6	12	142	Ken Payne	Wide receiver	Langston
7	12	168	Bart Purvis	Tackle	Maryland
8	12	194	Monte Doris	Linebacker	USC
8	18	200	Ned Guillet	Defensive back	Boston College
9	12	220	Harold Holton	Guard	UTEP
10	12	246	Doug Troszak	Defensive tackle	Michigan
11	12	272	Eric Torkelson	Running back	Connecticut
12	12	298	Randy Walker	Punter	Northwestern St.
13	12	324	Emanuel Armstrong	Linebacker	San Jose St.
14	12	350	Andrew Neloms	Defensive tackle	Kentucky St.
15	12	376	Dave Wannstedt	Tackle	Pittsburgh
16	12	402	Mark Cooney	Linebacker	Colorado
17	12	428	Randall Woodfield	Wide receiver	Portland St.

== 1975 draft ==
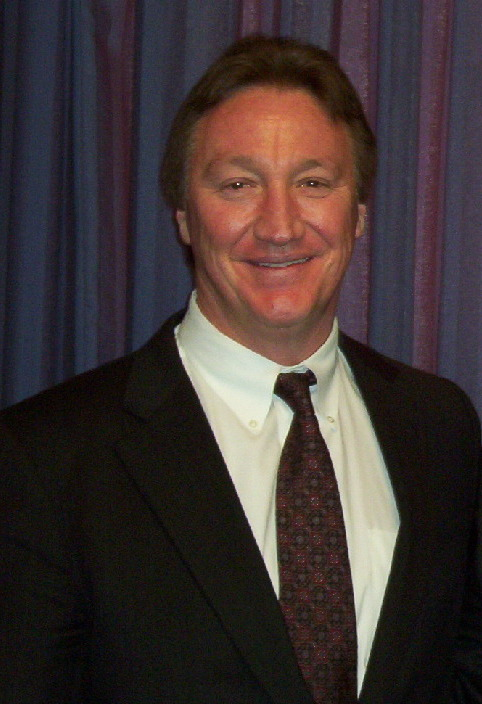
Carlos Brown, shown here in 2003, was the Packers' twelfth-round selection in the 1975 draft.

Green Bay Packers draft selections in 1975Source: Pro-Football-Reference.com
Round	Pick #	Overall	Name	Position	College
2	21	47	Bill Bain	Tackle	USC
3	6	58	Willard Harrell	Running back	Pacific
4	10	88	Steve Luke	Defensive back	Ohio St.
7	9	165	Tony Giaquinto	Wide receiver	Central Connecticut St.
9	9	217	Jay Hodgin	Running back	South Carolina
10	10	244	Bill Cooke	Defensive tackle	Massachusetts
11	9	269	Bob Martin	Defensive end	Washington
12	10	296	Carlos Brown	Quarterback	Pacific
13	9	321	Bob Fuhriman	Defensive back	Utah St.
14	10	348	Stan Blackmon	Tight end	North Texas
15	9	373	Randy Allen	Wide receiver	Southern
16	10	400	Bob McCaffrey	Center	USC
17	9	425	Tom Ray	Defensive back	Central Michigan

== 1976 draft ==
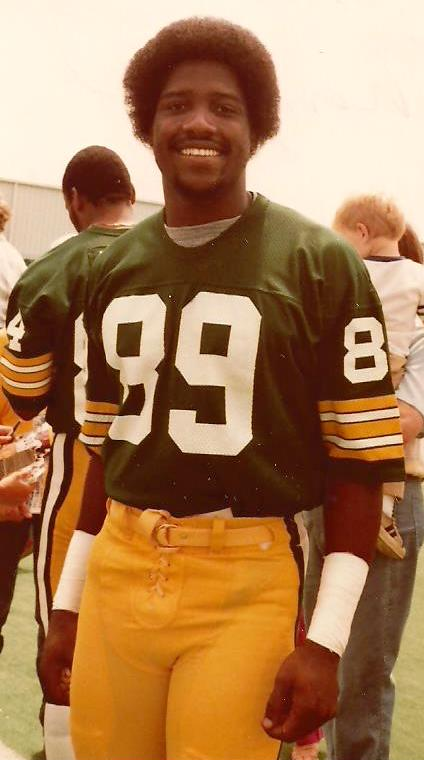
Aundra Thompson was the Packers' fifth-round selection in the 1976 draft.

Green Bay Packers draft selections in 1976Source: Pro-Football-Reference.com
Round	Pick #	Overall	Name	Position	College
1	23	23	Mark Koncar	Tackle	Colorado
3	12	72	Mike McCoy	Defensive back	Colorado
4	9	101	Tom Perko	Linebacker	Pittsburgh
5	8	132	Aundra Thompson	Wide receiver	East Texas St.
8	9	218	Jim Burrow	Defensive back	Nebraska
9	8	245	Jim Gueno	Linebacker	Tulane
10	9	274	Jessie Green	Wide receiver	Tulsa
11	10	301	Curtis Leak	Wide receiver	Johnson C. Smith
12	9	328	Mel Jackson	Guard	USC
13	8	355	Bradley Bowman	Defensive back	Southern Miss
14	11	386	John Henson	Running back	Cal Poly
15	10	413	Jerry Dandridge	Linebacker	Memphis St.
16	9	440	Mike Timmermans	Guard	Northern Iowa
17	8	467	Ray Hall	Tight end	Cal Poly

== 1977 draft ==
Green Bay Packers draft selections in 1977Source: Pro-Football-Reference.com
Round	Pick #	Overall	Name	Position	College
1	9	9	Mike Butler	Defensive end	Kansas
1	28	28	Ezra Johnson ^{#}	Defensive end	Morris Brown
2	11	39	Greg Koch ^{#}	Tackle	Arkansas
3	18	74	Rick Scribner	Guard	Idaho St.
5	10	122	Nate Simpson	Running back	Tennessee St.
6	10	149	Tim Moresco	Defensive back	Syracuse
7	5	172	Derrel Gofourth	Guard	Oklahoma St.
7	9	176	Rell Tipton	Guard	Baylor
8	11	206	David Whitehurst	Quarterback	Furman
9	10	233	Joel Mullins	Tackle	Arkansas St.
10	9	260	Jim Culbreath	Running back	Oklahoma
11	11	290	Terry Randolph	Defensive back	American International

== 1978 draft ==
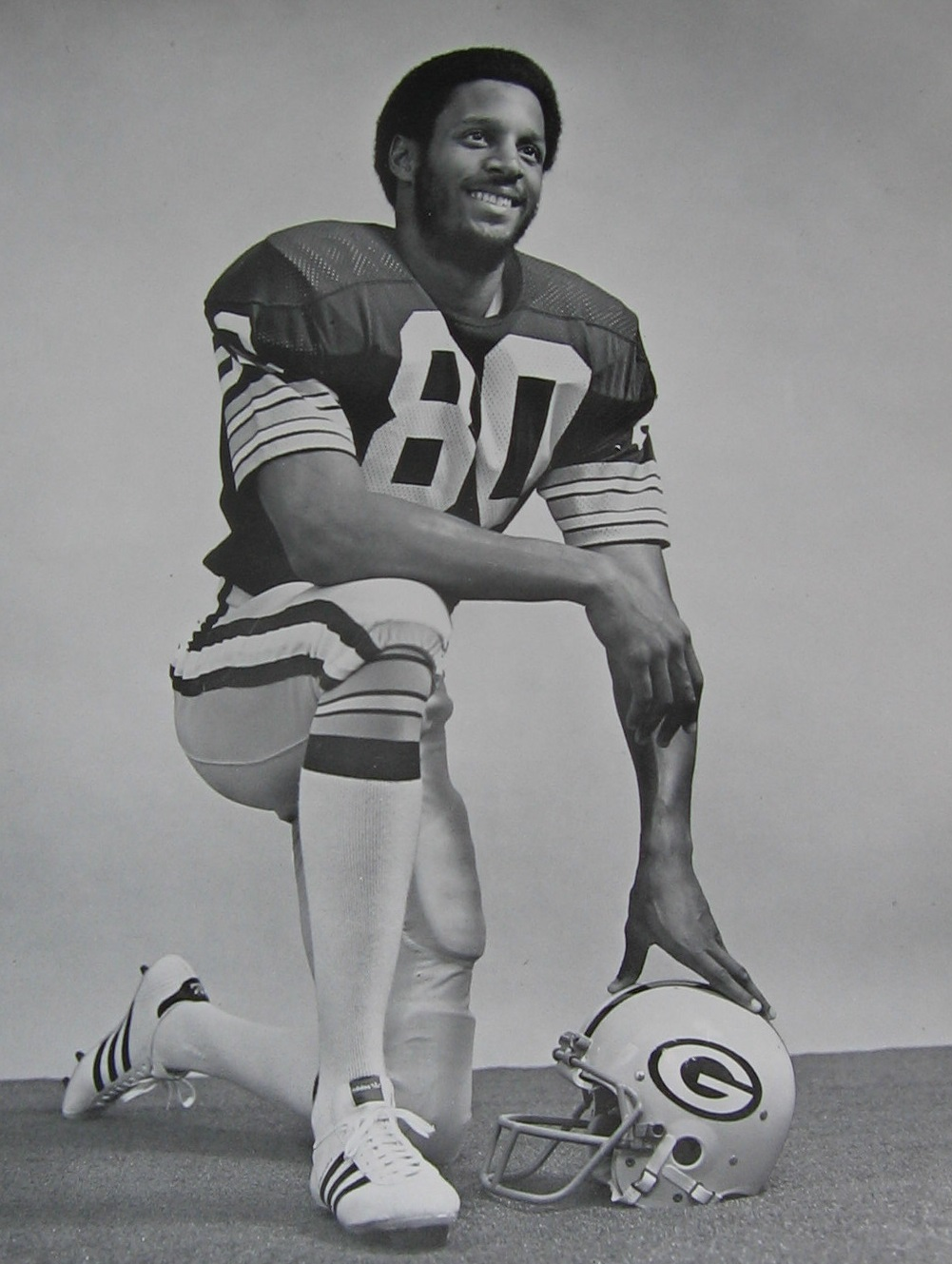
James Lofton, one of the Packers' first-round selection in the 1978 draft, went on to be inducted into the Pro Football Hall of Fame.

Green Bay Packers draft selections in 1978Source: Pro-Football-Reference.com
Round	Pick #	Overall	Name	Position	College
1	6	6	James Lofton ‡	Wide receiver	Stanford
1	26	26	John Anderson ^{#}	Linebacker	Michigan
2	6	34	Mike Hunt	Linebacker	Minnesota
3	6	62	Estus Hood	Defensive back	Illinois St.
5	6	116	Mike Douglass ^{#}	Linebacker	San Diego St.
5	18	128	Willie Wilder	Running back	Florida
6	6	144	Leotis Harris	Guard	Arkansas
7	6	172	George Plasketes	Linebacker	Ole Miss
8	6	200	Dennis Sproul	Quarterback	Arizona St.
9	6	228	Keith Myers	Quarterback	Utah St.
10	6	256	Larry Key	Running back	Florida St.
10	9	259	Mark Totten	Center	Florida
11	6	284	Terry Jones	Nose tackle	Alabama
12	6	312	Eason Ramson	Tight end	Washington St.

== 1979 draft ==
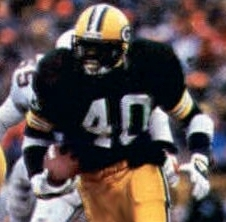
Eddie Lee Ivery was the Packers' first-round selection in the 1979 draft.

Green Bay Packers draft selections in 1979Source: Pro-Football-Reference.com
Round	Pick #	Overall	Name	Position	College
1	15	15	Eddie Lee Ivery	Running back	Georgia Tech
2	16	44	Steve Atkins	Running back	Maryland
3	15	71	Charles Johnson	Nose tackle	Maryland
6	16	153	Dave Simmons	Linebacker	North Carolina
7	15	180	Henry Monroe	Defensive back	Mississippi St.
7	19	184	Rich Wingo	Linebacker	Alabama
8	1	193	Ron Cassidy	Wide receiver	Utah St.
8	16	208	Rick Partridge	Punter	Utah
9	15	235	John Thompson	Tight end	Utah St.
10	16	264	Frank Lockett	Wide receiver	Nebraska
11	15	290	Mark Thorson	Defensive back	Ottawa
12	15	318	Bill Moats	Punter	South Dakota

== 1980 draft ==
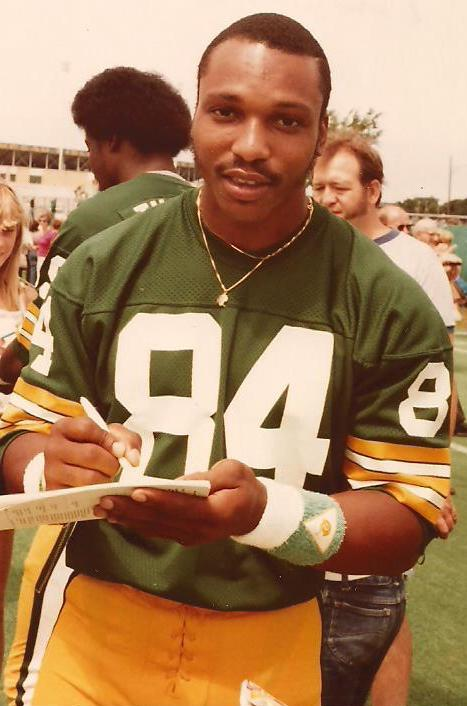
Fred Nixon was the Packers' fourth-round selection in the 1980 draft.

Green Bay Packers draft selections in 1980Source: Pro-Football-Reference.com
Round	Pick #	Overall	Name	Position	College
1	4	4	Bruce Clark	Defensive end	Penn St.
1	26	26	George Cumby	Linebacker	Oklahoma
2	6	34	Mark Lee ^{#}	Defensive back	Washington
3	5	61	Syd Kitson	Guard	Wake Forest
4	4	87	Fred Nixon	Wide receiver	Oklahoma
6	5	143	Karl Swanke	Tackle	Boston College
7	4	169	Buddy Aydelette	Tackle	Alabama
8	6	199	Tim Smith	Defensive back	Oregon St.
9	5	226	Kelly Saalfeld	Center	Nebraska
10	4	253	Jafus White	Defensive back	Texas A&I
11	6	283	Ricky Skiles	Linebacker	Louisville
12	5	310	James Stewart	Defensive back	Memphis St.

== 1981 draft ==
Green Bay Packers draft selections in 1981Source: Pro-Football-Reference.com
Round	Pick #	Overall	Name	Position	College
1	6	6	Rich Campbell	Quarterback	California
2	7	35	Gary Lewis	Tight end	Texas-Arlington
3	6	62	Ray Stachowicz	Punter	Michigan St.
4	22	105	Richard Turner	Nose tackle	Oklahoma
5	6	117	Byron Braggs	Defensive end	Alabama
7	6	172	Bill Whitaker	Defensive back	Missouri
8	7	200	Larry Werts	Linebacker	Jackson St.
9	6	227	Tim Huffman	Guard	Notre Dame
10	7	255	Nickie Hall	Quarterback	Tulane
11	6	282	Forrest Valora	Linebacker	Oklahoma
12	7	311	Cliff Lewis	Linebacker	Southern Miss

== 1982 draft ==
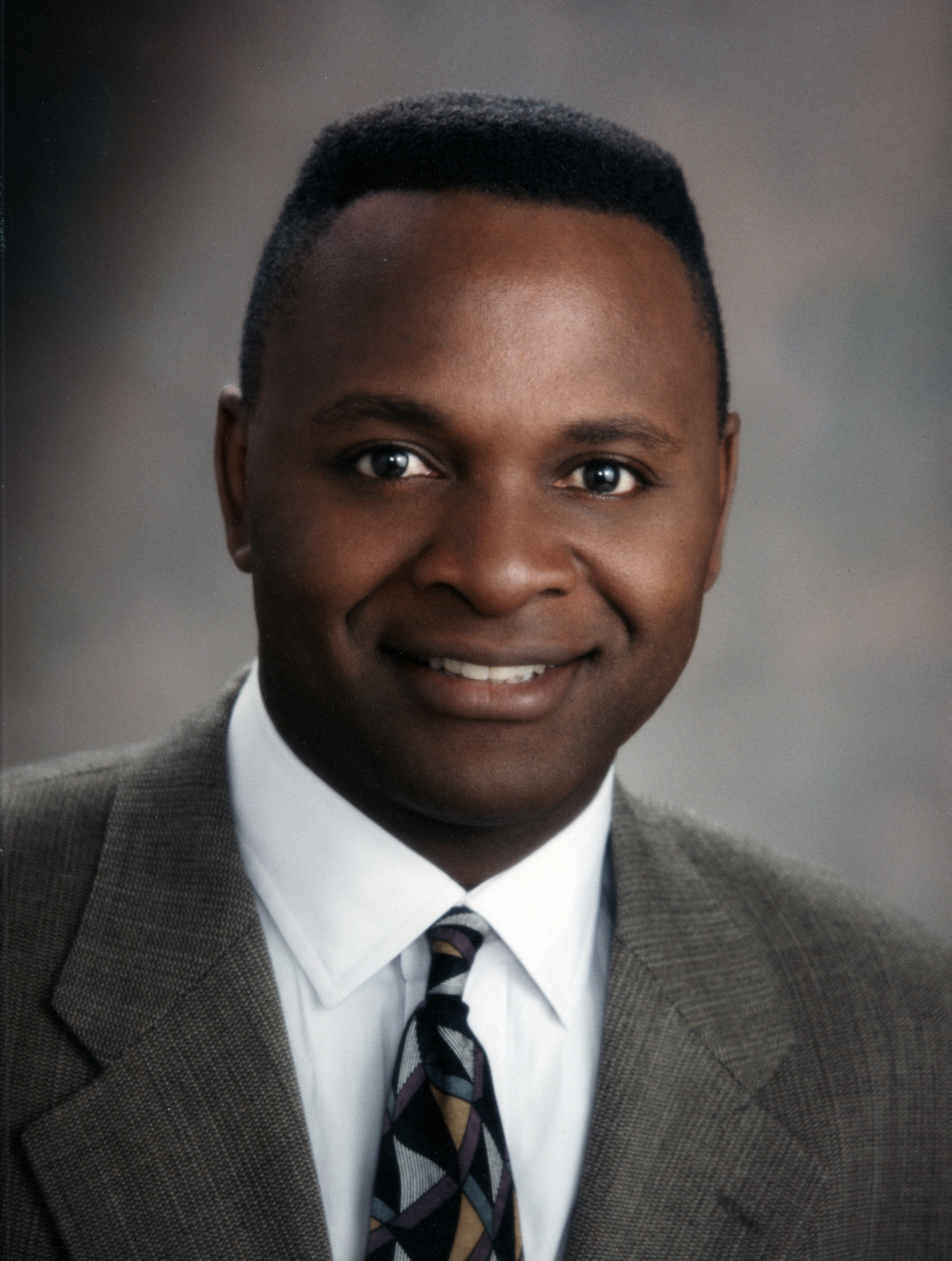
Del Rodgers, pictured here in 2013, was the Packers' third-round selection in the 1982 draft.

Green Bay Packers draft selections in 1982Source: Pro-Football-Reference.com
Round	Pick #	Overall	Name	Position	College
1	22	22	Ron Hallstrom	Guard	Iowa
3	16	71	Del Rodgers	Running back	Utah
4	15	98	Robert Brown	Defensive end	Virginia Tech
5	15	126	Mike Meade	Running back	Penn St.
6	13	152	Chet Parlavecchio	Linebacker	Penn St.
7	16	183	Joey Whitley	Defensive back	UTEP
8	15	210	Tom Boyd	Linebacker	Alabama
9	14	237	Charles Riggins	Defensive end	Bethune-Cookman
10	13	264	Eddie Garcia	Kicker	SMU
11	15	294	John Macaulay	Center	Stanford
12	15	321	Phil Epps	Wide receiver	TCU

== 1983 draft ==
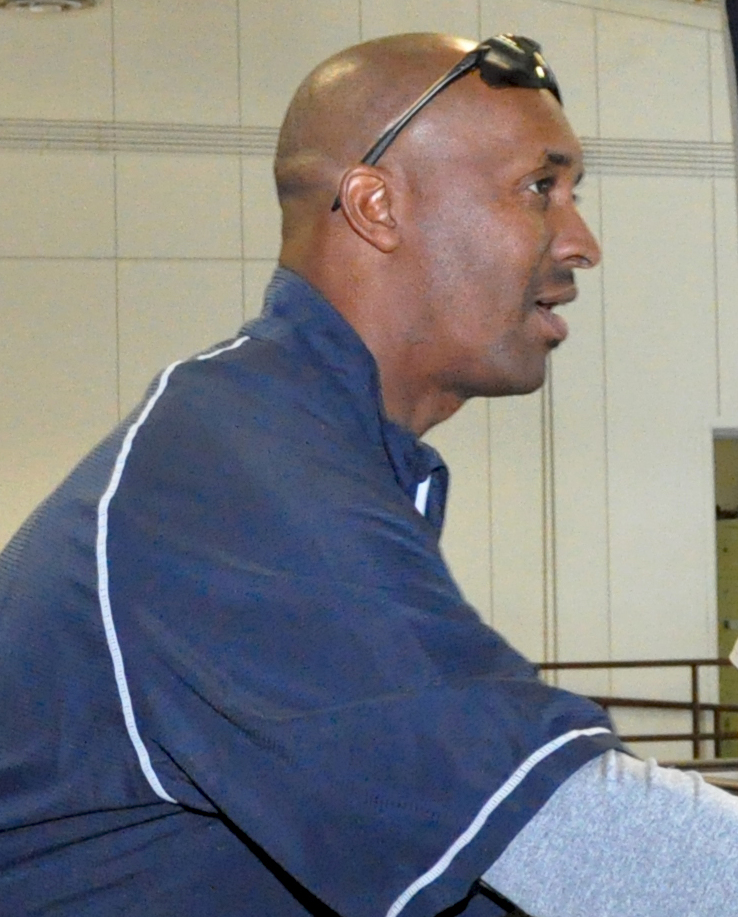
Byron Williams, pictured here in 2013, was one of the Packers' tenth-round selections in the 1983 draft.

Green Bay Packers draft selections in 1983Source: Pro-Football-Reference.com
Round	Pick #	Overall	Name	Position	College
1	11	11	Tim Lewis	Defensive back	Pittsburgh
2	20	48	Dave Drechsler	Guard	North Carolina
4	20	104	Mike Miller	Wide receiver	Tennessee
5	20	132	Bryan Thomas	Running back	Pittsburgh
6	20	160	Ron Sams	Center	Pittsburgh
7	20	188	Jessie Clark	Running back	Louisiana Tech
8	20	216	Carlton Briscoe	Defensive back	McNeese St.
9	19	243	Robin Ham	Center	West Texas A&M
10	2	253	Byron Williams	Wide receiver	Texas–Arlington
10	20	271	Jimmy Thomas	Defensive back	Indiana
11	20	299	Bucky Scribner	Punter	Kansas
12	20	327	John Harvey	Defensive tackle	USC

== 1984 draft ==
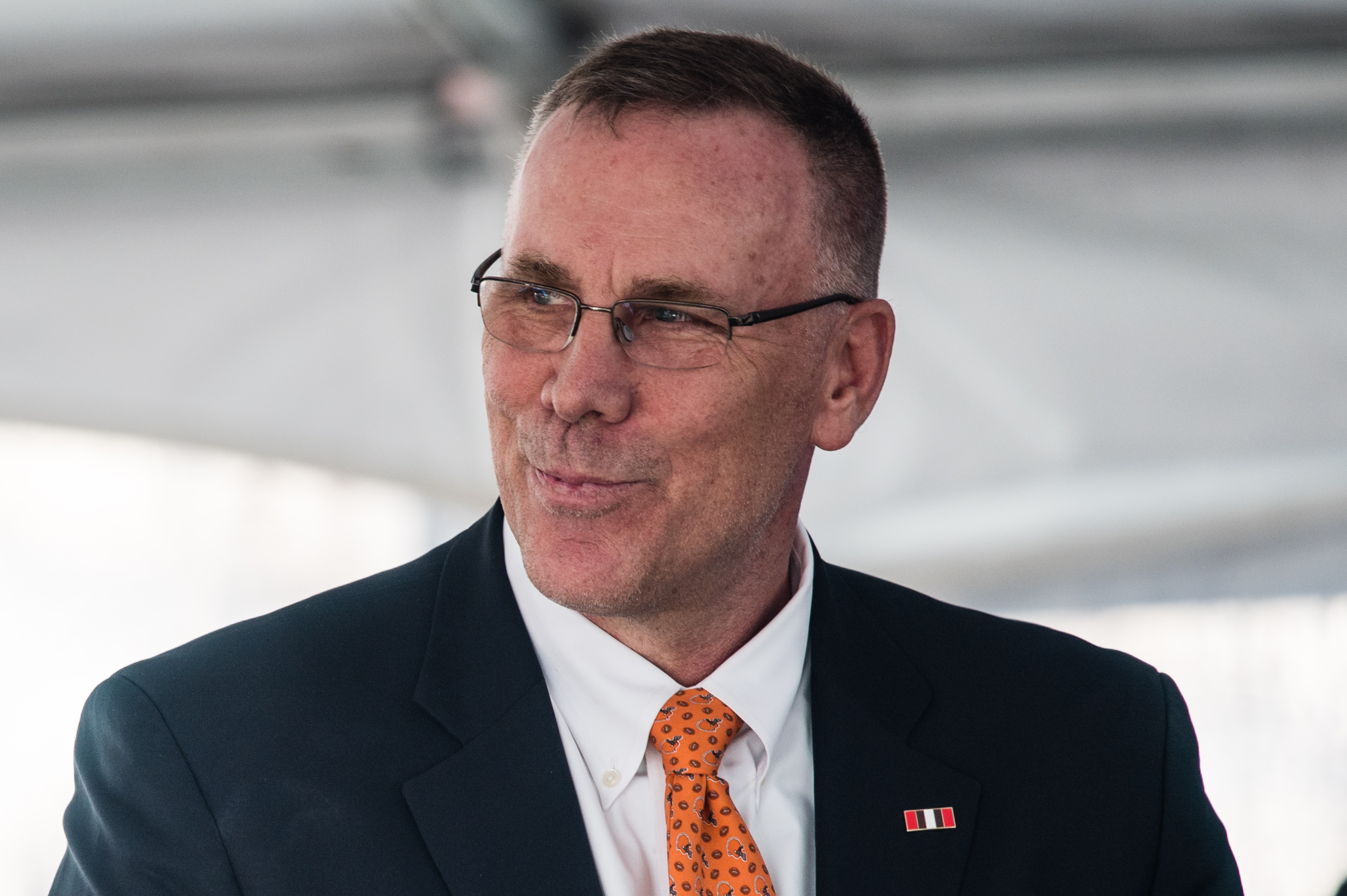
John Dorsey, pictured here in 2019, was the Packers' fourth-round selection in the 1984 draft.

Green Bay Packers draft selections in 1984Source: Pro-Football-Reference.com
Round	Pick #	Overall	Name	Position	College
1	12	12	Alphonso Carreker	Defensive end	Florida St.
3	16	72	Donnie Humphrey	Nose tackle	Auburn
4	15	99	John Dorsey	Linebacker	Connecticut
5	14	126	Tom Flynn	Defensive back	Pittsburgh
6	13	153	Randy Wright	Quarterback	Wisconsin
7	12	180	Daryll Jones	Defensive back	Georgia
10	15	267	Gary Hoffman	Tackle	Santa Clara
11	14	294	Mark Cannon	Center	Texas–Arlington
12	5	313	Lenny Taylor	Wide receiver	Tennessee
12	15	323	Mark Emans	Linebacker	Bowling Green

== 1984 NFL supplemental draft ==
Green Bay Packers draft selections in the 1984 NFL supplemental draft of USFL and CFL playersSource: Pro-Football-Reference.com
Round	Pick #	Overall	Name	Position	Pro team
1	12	12	Buford Jordan	Running back	New Orleans Breakers
2	11	39	Chuck Clanton	Defensive back	Birmingham Stallions
3	16	72	John Sullivan	Defensive back	Oakland Invaders

== 1985 draft ==
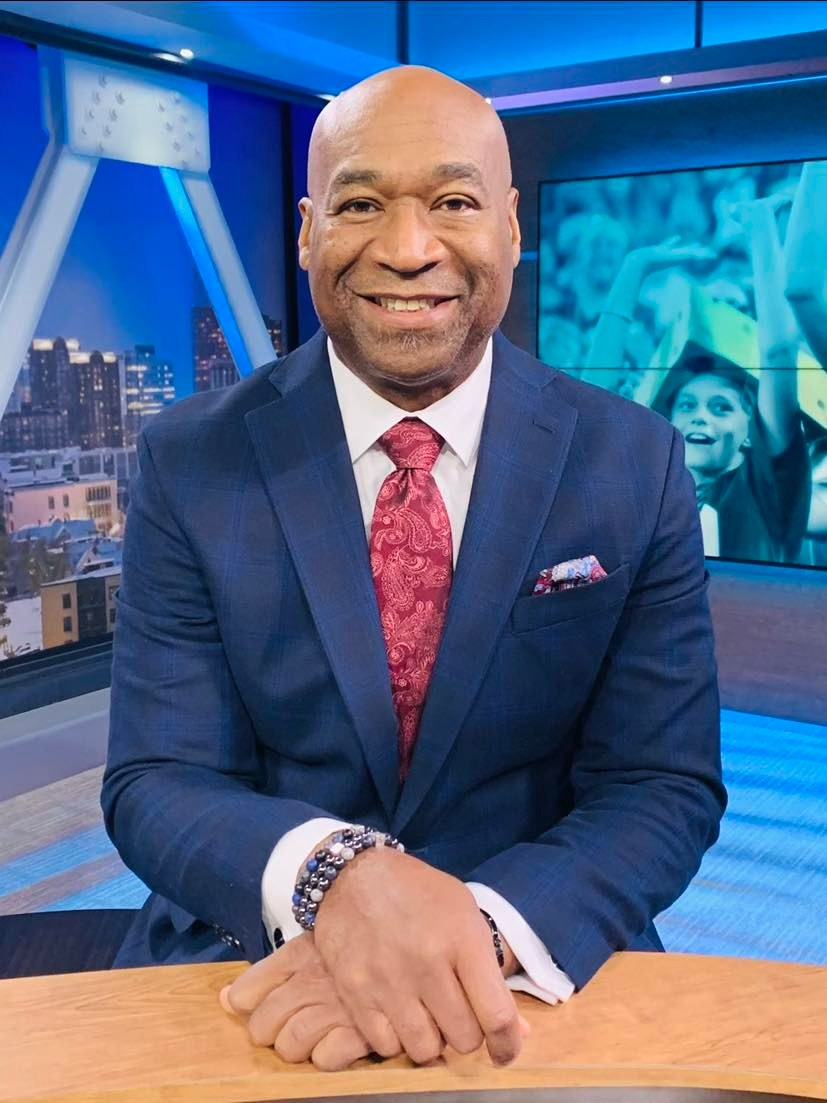
Gary Ellerson, pictured here in 2022, was one of the Packers' seventh-round selections in the 1985 draft.

Source: Pro-Football-Reference.com
Round	Pick #	Overall	Name	Position	College
1	7	7	Ken Ruettgers ^{#}	Tackle	USC
3	15	71	Rich Moran	Guard	San Diego St.
4	14	98	Walter Stanley	Wide receiver	Colorado Mesa
5	13	125	Brian Noble	Linebacker	Arizona St.
6	15	155	Mark Lewis	Tight end	Texas A&M
7	3	171	Eric Wilson	Linebacker	Maryland
7	14	182	Gary Ellerson	Running back	Wisconsin
8	13	209	Ken Stills	Defensive back	Wisconsin
9	15	239	Morris Johnson	Guard	Alabama A&M
10	14	266	Ronnie Burgess	Defensive back	Wake Forest
11	14	294	Joe Shield	Quarterback	Trinity (CT)
12	15	323	Jim Meyer	Punter	Arizona State

== 1986 draft ==
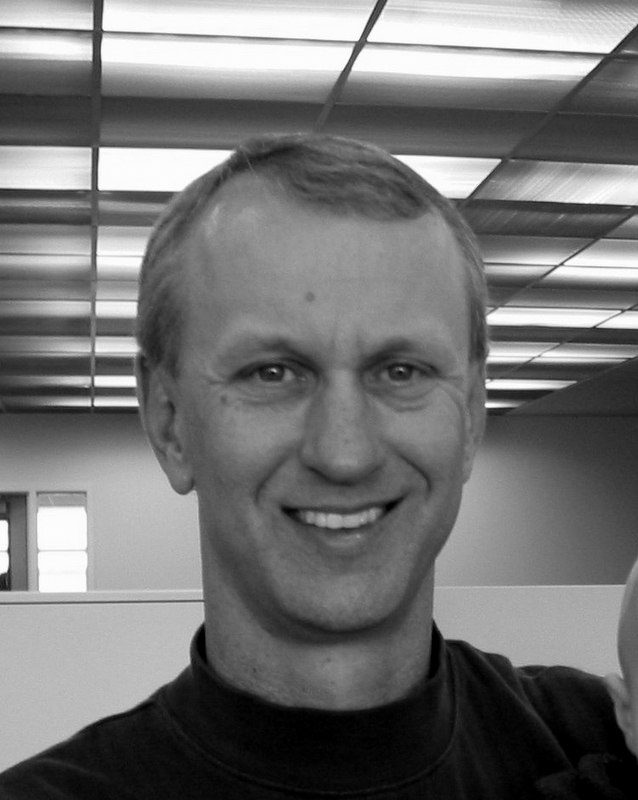
Robbie Bosco, pictured here in 2006, was the Packers' third-round selection in the 1986 draft.

Green Bay Packers draft selections in 1986Source: Pro-Football-Reference.com
Round	Pick #	Overall	Name	Position	College
2	14	41	Kenneth Davis	Running back	TCU
3	17	72	Robbie Bosco	Quarterback	BYU
4	2	84	Tim Harris ^{#}	Linebacker	Memphis St.
4	16	98	Dan Knight	Tackle	San Diego St.
5	15	125	Matt Koart	Defensive end	USC
6	5	143	Burnell Dent	Linebacker	Tulane
7	17	183	Ed Berry	Defensive back	Utah St.
8	16	210	Michael Cline	Defensive tackle	Arkansas St.
9	15	236	Brent Moore	Linebacker	USC
10	14	263	Gary Spann	Linebacker	TCU

== 1987 draft ==
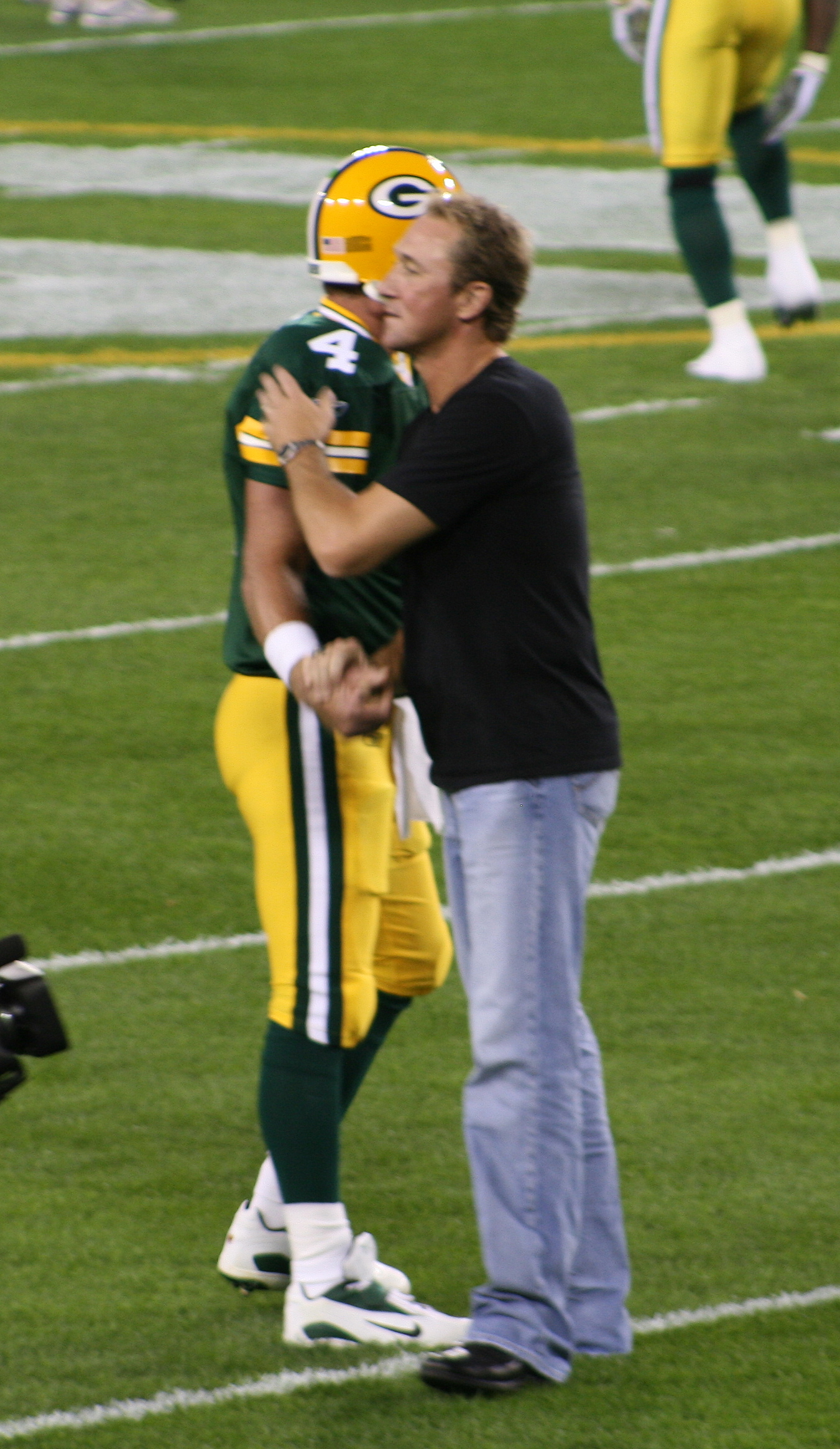
Don Majkowski, pictured here in street clothes, was the Packers' tenth-round selection in the 1987 draft.

Green Bay Packers draft selections in 1987Source: Pro-Football-Reference.com
Round	Pick #	Overall	Name	Position	College
1	4	4	Brent Fullwood	Running back	Auburn
2	13	41	Johnny Holland ^{#}	Linebacker	Texas A&M
3	5	61	Dave Croston	Tackle	Iowa
3	13	69	Scott Stephen	Linebacker	Arizona St.
3	15	71	Frankie Neal	Wide receiver	Fort Hays St.
4	5	89	Lorenzo Freeman	Nose tackle	Pittsburgh
6	5	145	Willie Marshall	Wide receiver	Temple
7	4	172	Tony Leiker	Defensive end	Stanford
7	23	191	Bill Smith	Punter	Ole Miss
8	3	198	Jeff Drost	Defensive tackle	Iowa
9	5	228	Gregg Harris	Guard	Wake Forest
10	4	255	Don Majkowski ^{#}	Quarterback	Virginia
11	3	282	Patrick Scott	Wide receiver	Grambling St.
12	28	355	Norman Jefferson	Defensive back	LSU

== 1988 draft ==
Green Bay Packers draft selections in 1988Source: Pro-Football-Reference.com
Round	Pick #	Overall	Name	Position	College
1	7	7	Sterling Sharpe ^{‡}	Wide receiver	South Carolina
2	7	34	Shawn Patterson	Defensive end	Arizona St.
3	6	61	Keith Woodside	Running back	Texas A&M
4	6	88	Rollin Putzier	Defensive tackle	Oregon
4	7	89	Chuck Cecil	Defensive back	Arizona
5	7	116	Darrell Reed	Linebacker	Oklahoma
6	7	144	Nate Hill	Defensive end	Auburn
7	8	173	Gary Richard	Defensive back	Pittsburgh
8	7	200	Patrick Collins	Running back	Oklahoma
9	7	228	Neal Wilkinson	Tight end	James Madison
10	7	256	Bud Keyes	Quarterback	Wisconsin
12	7	312	Scott Bolton	Wide receiver	Auburn

== 1989 draft ==
Green Bay Packers draft selections in 1989Source: Pro-Football-Reference.com
Round	Pick #	Overall	Name	Position	College
1	2	2	Tony Mandarich	Tackle	Michigan St.
3	2	58	Matt Brock	Defensive end	Oregon
3	18	74	Anthony Dilweg	Quarterback	Duke
4	3	87	Jeff Graham	Quarterback	Long Beach St.
5	12	124	Jeff Query	Wide receiver	Millikin
5	15	127	Vince Workman	Running back	Ohio St.
6	3	142	Chris Jacke ^{#}	Placekicker	UTEP
7	2	169	Mark Hall	Defensive end	Louisiana
8	3	198	Thomas King	Defensive back	Louisiana
8	11	206	Brian Shulman	Punter	Auburn
9	2	225	Scott Kirby	Tackle	Arizona St.
10	3	254	Ben Jessie	Defensive back	Texas St.
11	2	281	Cedric Stallworth	Defensive back	Georgia Tech
12	3	310	Stan Shiver	Defensive back	Florida St.

== 1990 draft ==
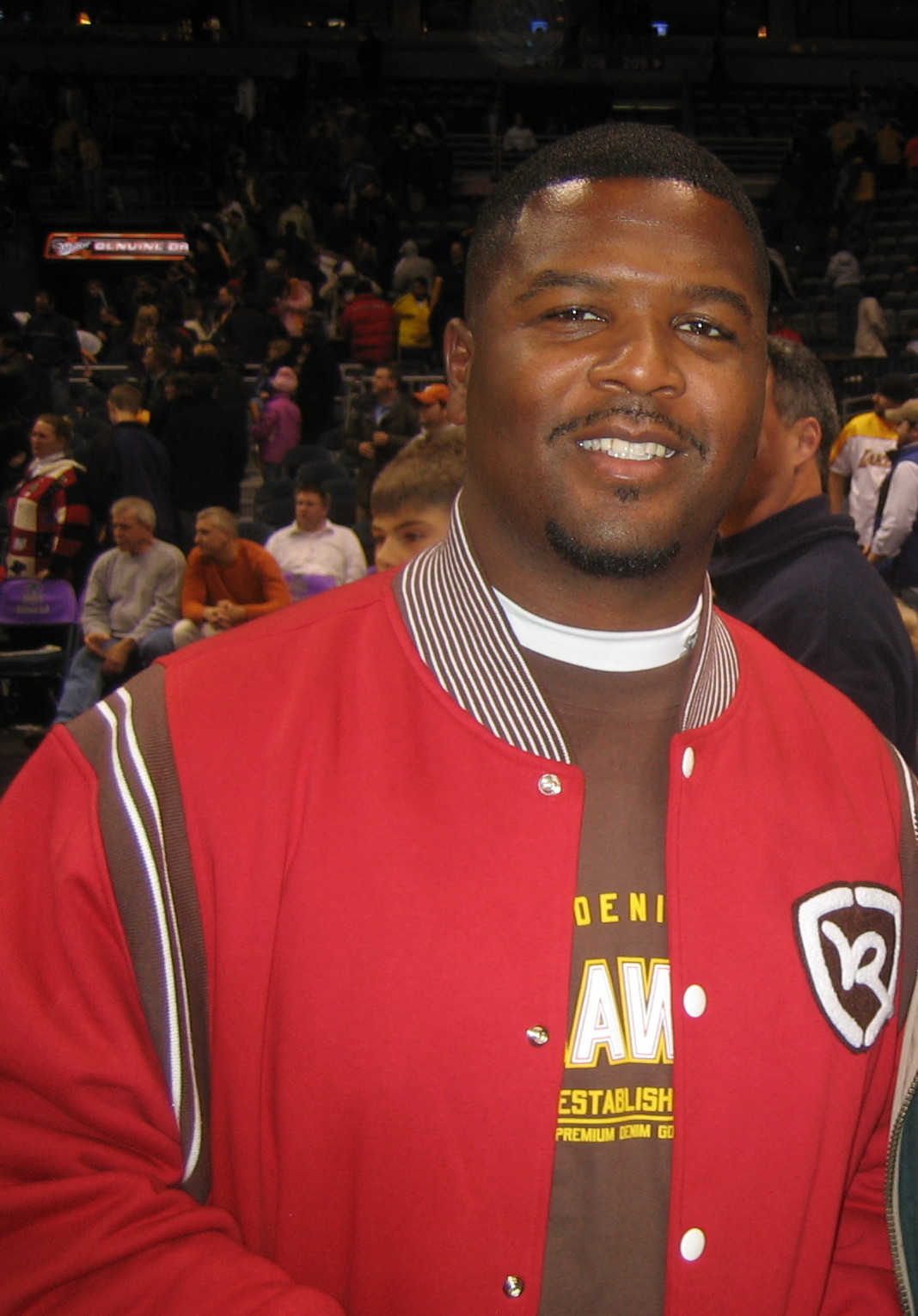
LeRoy Butler, pictured here in 2007, was the Packers' second-round selection in the 1990 draft.

Green Bay Packers draft selections in 1990Source: Pro-Football-Reference.com
Round	Pick #	Overall	Name	Position	College
1	18	18	Tony Bennett	Defensive end	Ole Miss
1	19	19	Darrell Thompson	Running back	Minnesota
2	23	48	LeRoy Butler ^{‡}	Defensive back	Florida St.
3	22	75	Bobby Houston	Linebacker	North Carolina St.
4	21	102	Jackie Harris	Tight end	LA-Monroe
5	23	132	Charles Wilson	Wide receiver	Memphis
6	22	159	Bryce Paup	Linebacker	Northern Iowa
7	21	186	Lester Archambeau	Defensive end	Stanford
8	22	215	Roger Brown	Defensive back	Virginia Tech
9	22	242	Kirk Baumgartner	Quarterback	Wisconsin–Stevens Point
10	21	269	Jerome Martin	Defensive back	Western Kentucky
11	23	299	Harry Jackson	Running back	St. Cloud St.
12	21	325	Kirk Maggio	Punter	UCLA

== 1991 draft ==
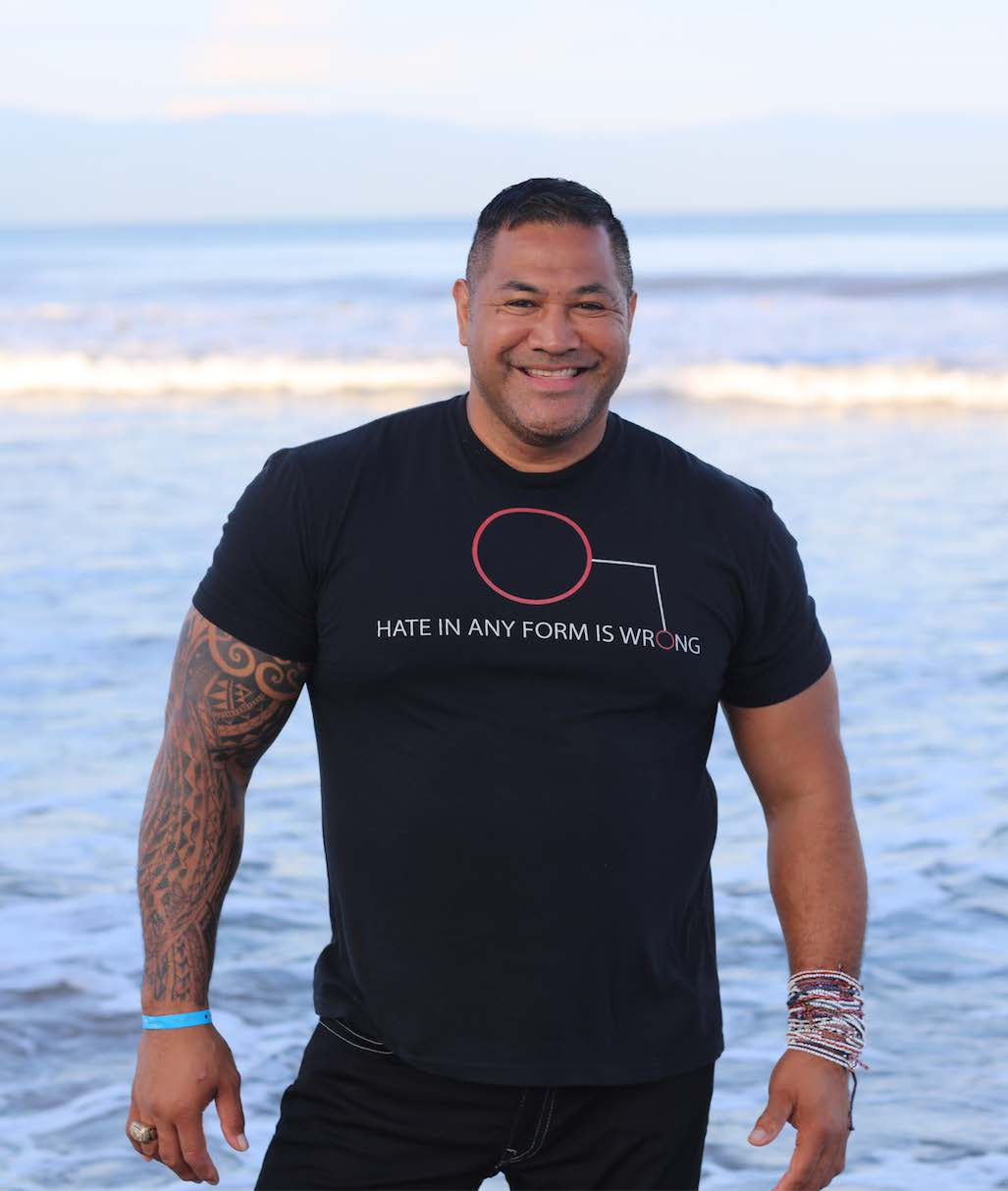
Esera Tuaolo, pictured here in 2021, was the Packers' second-round selection in the 1991 draft.

Green Bay Packers draft selections in 1991Source: Pro-Football-Reference.com
Round	Pick #	Overall	Name	Position	College
1	19	19	Vinnie Clark	Defensive back	Ohio St.
2	8	35	Esera Tuaolo	Nose tackle	Oregon St.
3	12	67	Don Davey	Defensive tackle	Wisconsin
3	26	81	Chuck Webb	Fullback	Tennessee
5	24	135	Jeff Fite	Punter	Memphis
6	10	149	Walter Dean	Running back	Grambling St.
6	25	164	Joe Garten	Center	Colorado
7	2	169	Frank Blevins	Linebacker	Oklahoma
7	9	176	Reggie Burnette	Linebacker	Houston
8	8	203	Johnny Walker	Wide receiver	Texas
9	6	229	Dean Witkowski	Linebacker	North Dakota
10	12	262	Rapier Porter	Tight end	Arkansas-Pine Bluff
11	11	289	J. J. Wierenga	Defensive end	Central Michigan
12	10	316	Linzy Collins	Wide receiver	Missouri

== 1992 draft ==
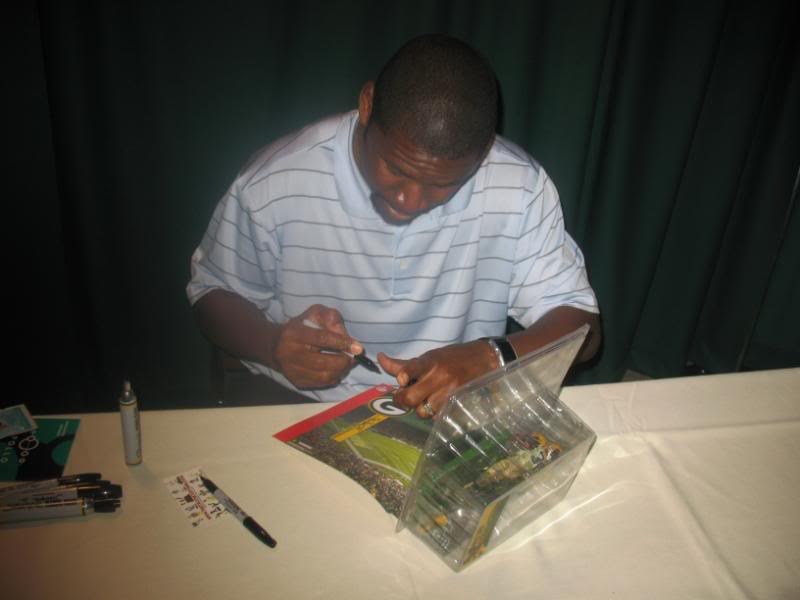
Edgar Bennett, seen here autographing memorabilia, was the Packers' fourth-round selection in the 1992 draft.

Green Bay Packers draft selections in 1992Source: Pro-Football-Reference.com
Round	Pick #	Overall	Name	Position	College
1	5	5	Terrell Buckley	Cornerback	Florida St.
2	6	34	Mark D'Onofrio	Linebacker	Penn St.
3	6	62	Robert Brooks ^{#}	Wide receiver	South Carolina
4	19	103	Edgar Bennett ^{#}	Running back	Florida State
5	7	119	Dexter McNabb	Fullback	Florida
5	18	130	Orlando McKay	Wide receiver	Washington
6	17	157	Mark Chmura ^{#}	Tight end	Boston College
7	22	190	Chris Holder	Wide receiver	Tuskegee
9	6	230	Ty Detmer	Quarterback	BYU
9	16	240	Shazzon Bradley	Defensive tackle	Tennessee
10	5	257	Andrew Oberg	Tackle	North Carolina
11	7	287	Gabe Mokuwah	Linebacker	American International
12	6	314	Brett Collins	Linebacker	Washington

== 1993 draft ==
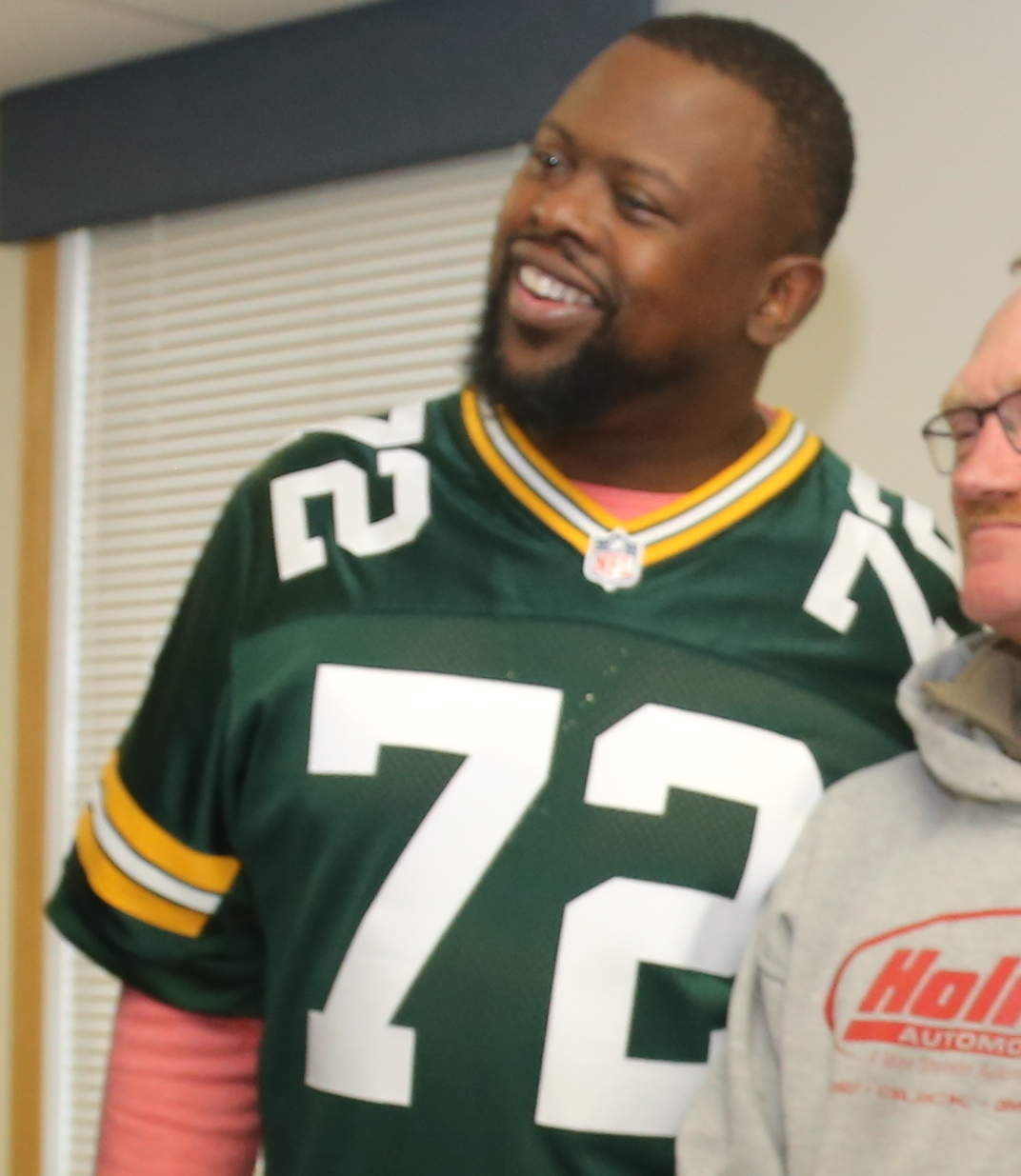
Earl Dotson was the Packers' third-round selection in the 1993 draft.

Green Bay Packers draft selections in 1993Source: Pro-Football-Reference.com
Round	Pick #	Overall	Name	Position	College
1	15	15	Wayne Simmons	Linebacker	Clemson
1	29	29	George Teague	Defensive back	Alabama
3	25	81	Earl Dotson	Tackle	Texas A&I
5	6	118	Mark Brunell	Quarterback	Washington
5	7	119	James Willis	Linebacker	Auburn
6	1	141	Doug Evans	Defensive back	Louisiana Tech
6	12	152	Paul Hutchins	Tackle	Western Michigan
6	16	156	Tim Watson	Defensive back	Howard
7	15	183	Bob Kuberski	Defensive tackle	Navy

== 1994 draft ==
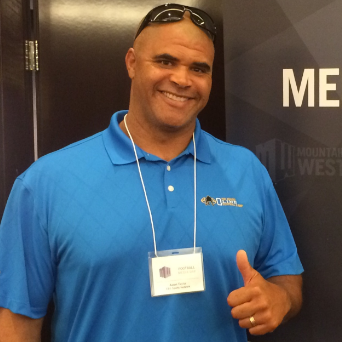
Aaron Taylor, seen here in 2016, was the Packers' first-round selection in the 1994 draft.

Green Bay Packers draft selections in 1994Source: Pro-Football-Reference.com
Round	Pick #	Overall	Name	Position	College
1	16	16	Aaron Taylor	Guard	Notre Dame
3	19	84	LeShon Johnson	Running back	Northern Illinois
4	23	126	Gabe Wilkins	Defensive end	Gardner-Webb
5	15	146	Terry Mickens	Wide receiver	Florida A&M
5	18	149	Dorsey Levens ^{#}	Running back	Georgia Tech
6	8	169	Jay Kearney	Wide receiver	West Virginia
6	14	175	Ruffin Hamilton	Linebacker	Tulane
6	20	181	Bill Schroeder	Wide receiver	Wisconsin–La Crosse
6	29	190	Paul Duckworth	Linebacker	Connecticut

== 1995 draft ==
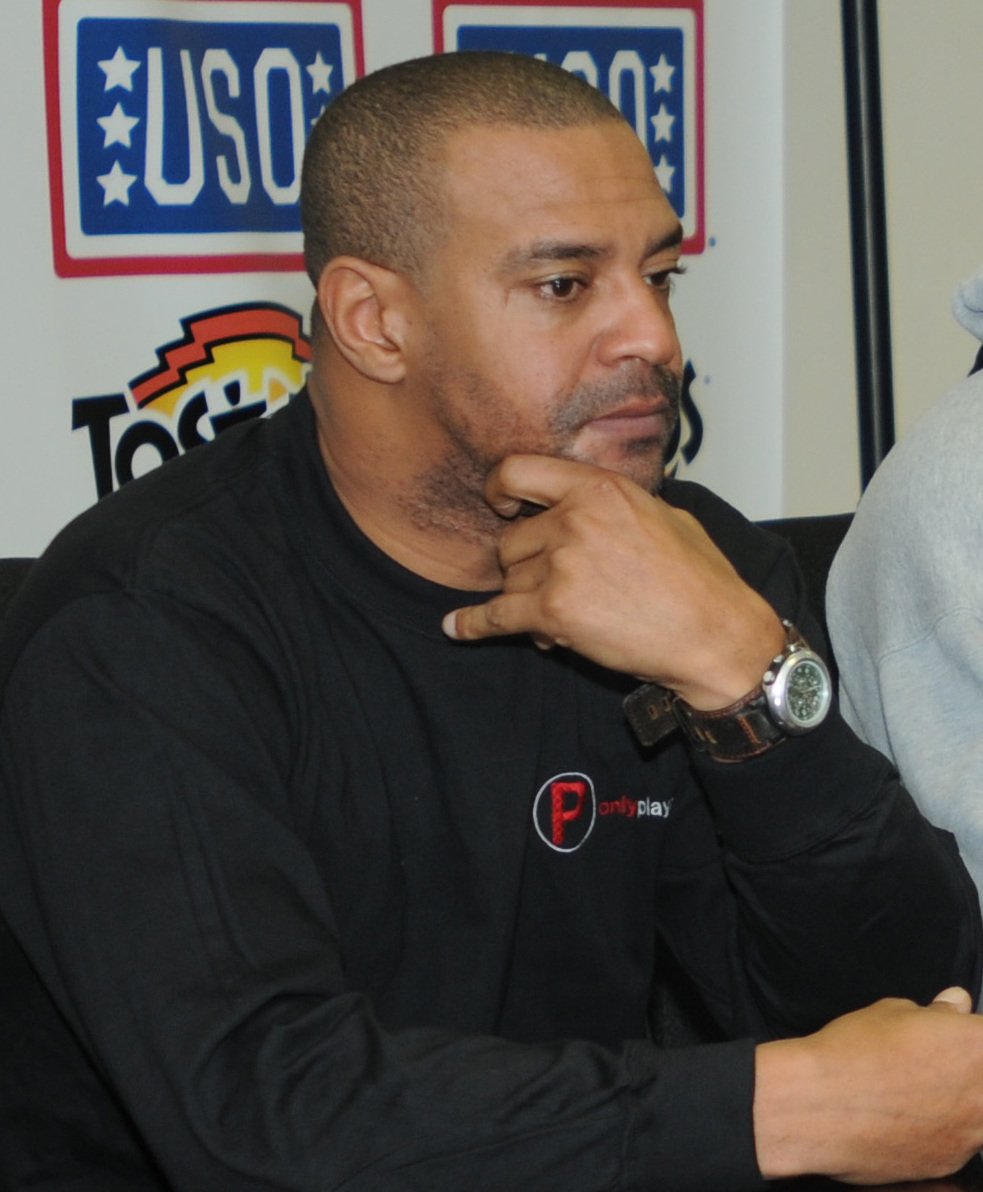
Antonio Freeman, seen here in 2010, was one of the Packers' third-round selections in the 1995 draft.

Green Bay Packers draft selections in 1995Source: Pro-Football-Reference.com
Round	Pick #	Overall	Name	Position	College
1	32	32	Craig Newsome	Defensive back	Arizona St.
3	1	65	Darius Holland	Defensive tackle	Colorado
3	2	66	William Henderson ^{#}	Fullback	North Carolina
3	9	73	Brian Wiliams	Linebacker	USC
3	26	90	Antonio Freeman ^{#}	Wide receiver	Virginia Tech
4	19	117	Jeff Miller	Tackle	Ole Miss
5	26	160	Jay Barker	Quarterback	Alabama
5	36	170	Travis Jervey	Running back	The Citadel
6	2	173	Charlie Simmons	Wide receiver	Georgia Tech
7	22	230	Adam Timmerman	Guard	South Dakota St.

== 1996 draft ==
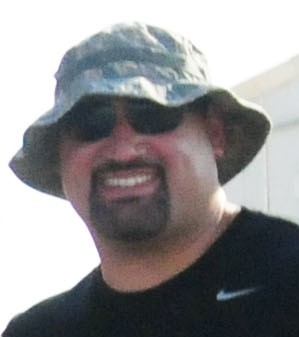
Marco Rivera, seen here in 2011, was the Packers' sixth-round selection in the 1996 draft.

Green Bay Packers draft selections in 1996Source: Pro-Football-Reference.com
Round	Pick #	Overall	Name	Position	College
1	27	27	John Michels	Tackle	USC
2	26	56	Derrick Mayes	Wide receiver	Notre Dame
3	29	90	Mike Flanagan	Center	UCLA
3	32	93	Tyrone Williams	Defensive back	Nebraska
4	28	123	Chris Darkins	Defensive back	Minnesota
6	41	208	Marco Rivera ^{#}	Guard	Penn St.
7	31	240	Kyle Wachholtz	Quarterback	USC
7	43	252	Keith McKenzie	Defensive end	Ball St.

== 1997 draft ==
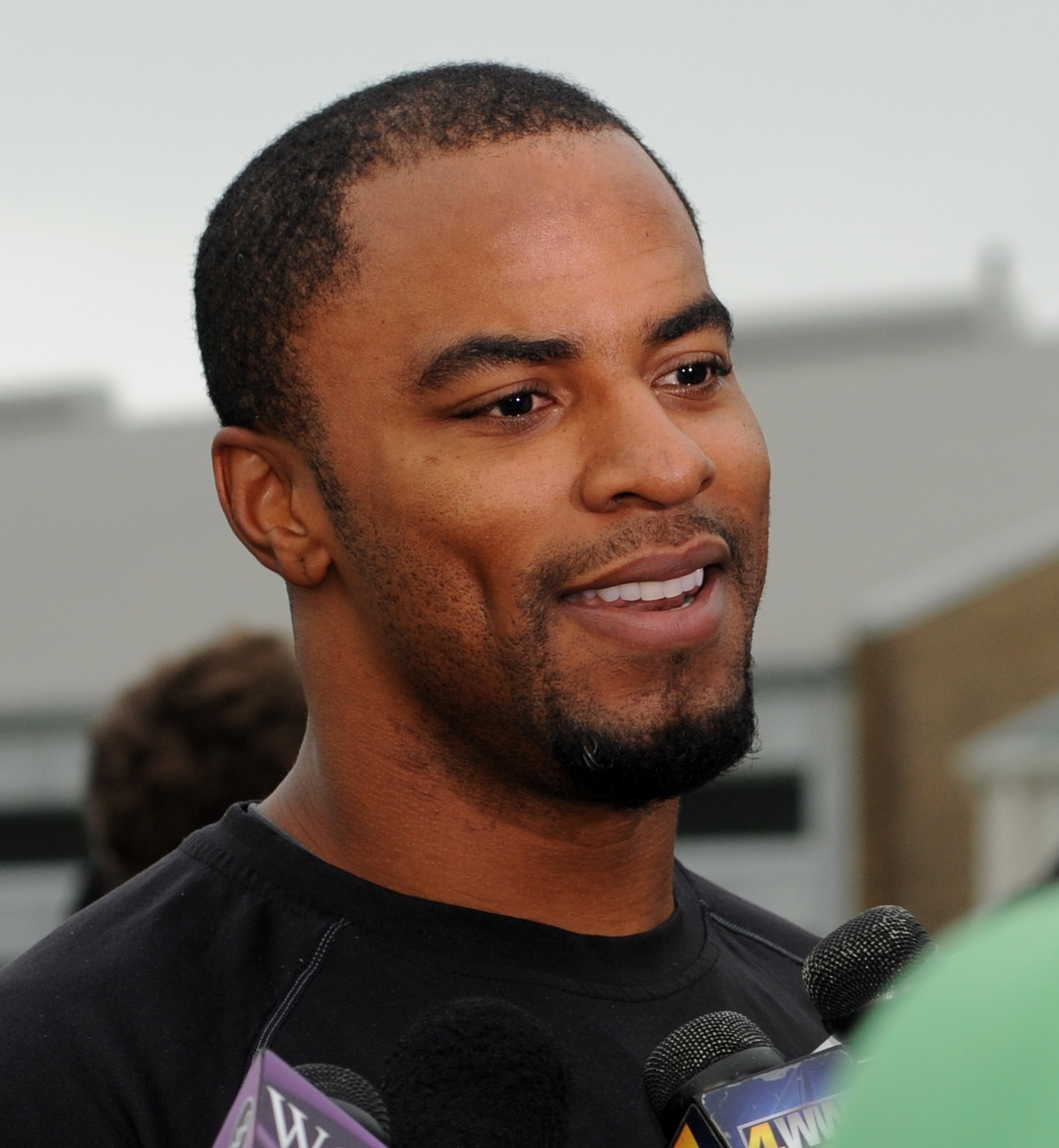
Darren Sharper, seen here in 2011, was the Packers' second-round selection in the 1997 draft.

Green Bay Packers draft selections in 1997Source: Pro-Football-Reference.com
Round	Pick #	Overall	Name	Position	College
1	30	30	Ross Verba	Tackle	Iowa
2	30	60	Darren Sharper	Defensive back	William & Mary
3	30	90	Brett Conway	Kicker	Penn St.
4	30	126	Jermaine Smith	Defensive tackle	Georgia
5	30	160	Anthony Hicks	Linebacker	Arkansas
7	12	213	Chris Miller	Wide receiver	USC
7	30	231	Jerald Sowell	Fullback	Tulane
7	39	240	Ronnie McAda	Quarterback	Army

== 1998 draft ==
Matt Hasselbeck, seen here in 2007 with the Seattle Seahawks, was one of the Packers' sixth-round selections in the 1998 draft.

=== Supplemental draft pick ===
Green Bay Packers supplemental draft selections in 1998
Round	Pick #	Overall	Name	Position	College
2 (Note: The Packers forfeited a second-round draft pick in the 1999 draft due to the selection of Mike Wahle in the 1998 supplemental draft. The 16th pick in the second round of the 1999 draft was acquired by the Packers from the Seattle Seahawks.)	—	—	Mike Wahle	Tackle	Navy

=== Annual draft picks ===
Green Bay Packers draft selections in 1998Source: Pro-Football-Reference.com
Round	Pick #	Overall	Name	Position	College
1	19	19	Vonnie Holliday	Defensive end	North Carolina
3	29	90	Jonathan Brown	Defensive end	Tennessee
4	29	121	Roosevelt Blackmon	Defensive back	Morris Brown
5	27	150	Corey Bradford	Wide receiver	Jackson St.
6	3	156	Scott McGarrahan	Defensive back	New Mexico
6	34	187	Matt Hasselbeck	Quarterback	Boston College
7	29	218	Edwin Watson	Running back	Purdue

== 1999 draft ==
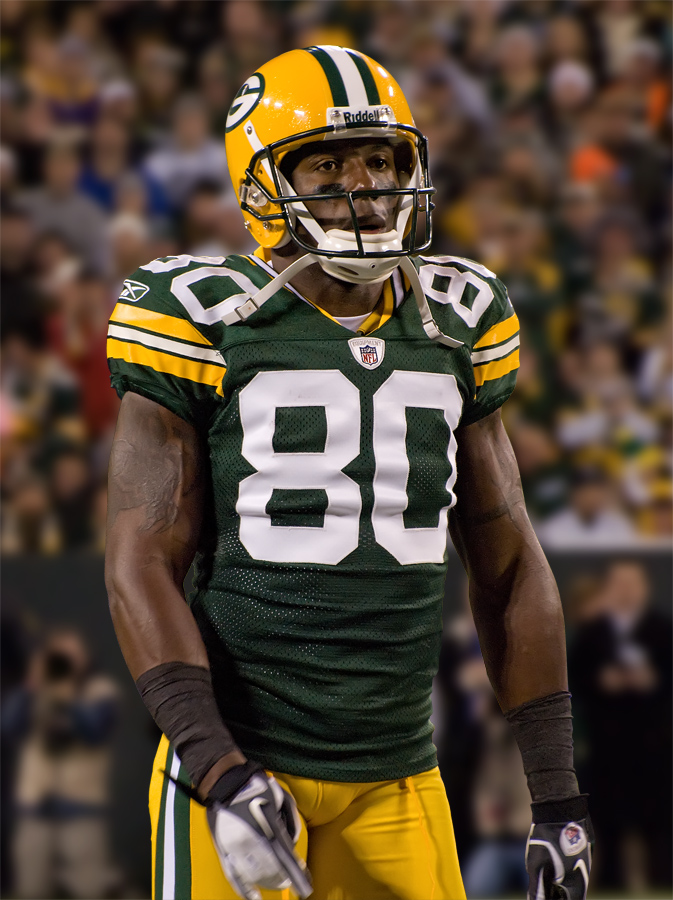
Donald Driver was one of the Packers' seventh-round selections in the 1999 draft.

Green Bay Packers draft selections in 1999Source: Pro-Football-Reference.com
Round	Pick #	Overall	Name	Position	College
1	25	25	Antuan Edwards	Defensive back	Clemson
2	16	47	Fred Vinson	Defensive back	Vanderbilt
3	26	87	Mike McKenzie	Defensive back	Memphis
3	33	94	Cletidus Hunt	Defensive tackle	Kentucky St.
4	36	131	Aaron Brooks	Quarterback	Virginia
4	38	133	Josh Bidwell	Punter	Oregon
5	26	159	De'Mond Parker	Running back	Oklahoma
5	30	163	Craig Heimburger	Guard	Missouri
6	27	196	Dee Miller	Wide receiver	Ohio St.
6	34	203	Scott Curry	Tackle	Montana
7	6	212	Chris Akins	Defensive back	Arkansas–Pine Bluff
7	7	213	Donald Driver ^{#}	Wide receiver	Alcorn St.

== 2000 draft ==
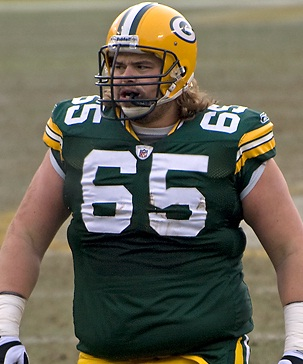
Mark Tauscher was one of the Packers' seventh-round selections in the 2000 draft.

Green Bay Packers draft selections in 2000Source: Pro-Football-Reference.com
Round	Pick #	Overall	Name	Position	College
1	14	14	Bubba Franks	Tight end	Miami (FL)
2	13	44	Chad Clifton ^{#}	Tackle	Tennessee
3	12	74	Steve Warren	Defensive tackle	Nebraska
4	4	98	Na'il Diggs	Linebacker	Ohio St.
4	20	114	Anthony Lucas	Wide receiver	Arkansas
4	32	126	Gary Berry	Defensive back	Ohio St.
5	20	149	Kabeer Gbaja-Biamila ^{#}	Defensive end	San Diego St.
5	22	151	Joey Jamison	Wide receiver	Texas Southern
7	18	224	Mark Tauscher ^{#}	Tackle	Wisconsin
7	23	229	Ron Moore	Defensive tackle	Northwestern Oklahoma St.
7	36	242	Charles Lee	Wide receiver	Central Florida
7	43	249	Eugene McCaslin	Linebacker	Florida
7	46	252	Rondell Mealey	Running back	LSU

== 2001 draft ==
Green Bay Packers draft selections in 2001Source: Pro-Football-Reference.com
Round	Pick #	Overall	Name	Position	College
1	10	10	Jamal Reynolds	Defensive end	Florida St.
2	10	41	Robert Ferguson	Wide receiver	Texas A&M
3	9	71	Bhawoh Jue	Defensive back	Penn St.
3	10	72	Torrance Marshall	Linebacker	Oklahoma
4	10	105	Bill Ferrario	Guard	Wisconsin
6	35	198	David Martin	Tight end	Tennessee

== 2002 draft ==
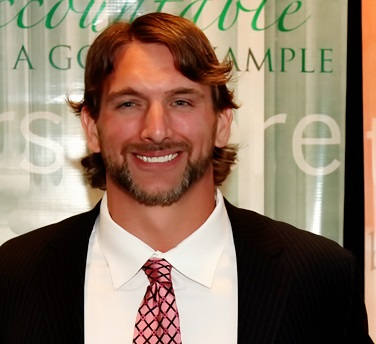
Aaron Kampman, seen here in 2012, was one of the Packers' fifth-round selections in the 2002 draft.

Green Bay Packers draft selections in 2002Source: Pro-Football-Reference.com
Round	Pick #	Overall	Name	Position	College
1	20	20	Javon Walker	Wide receiver	Florida St.
3	27	92	Marques Anderson	Safety	UCLA
4	37	135	Najeh Davenport	Running back	Miami (FL)
5	21	156	Aaron Kampman ^{#}	Defensive end	Iowa
5	29	164	Craig Nall	Quarterback	Northwestern St.
6	28	200	Mike Houghton	Guard	San Diego St.

== 2003 draft ==
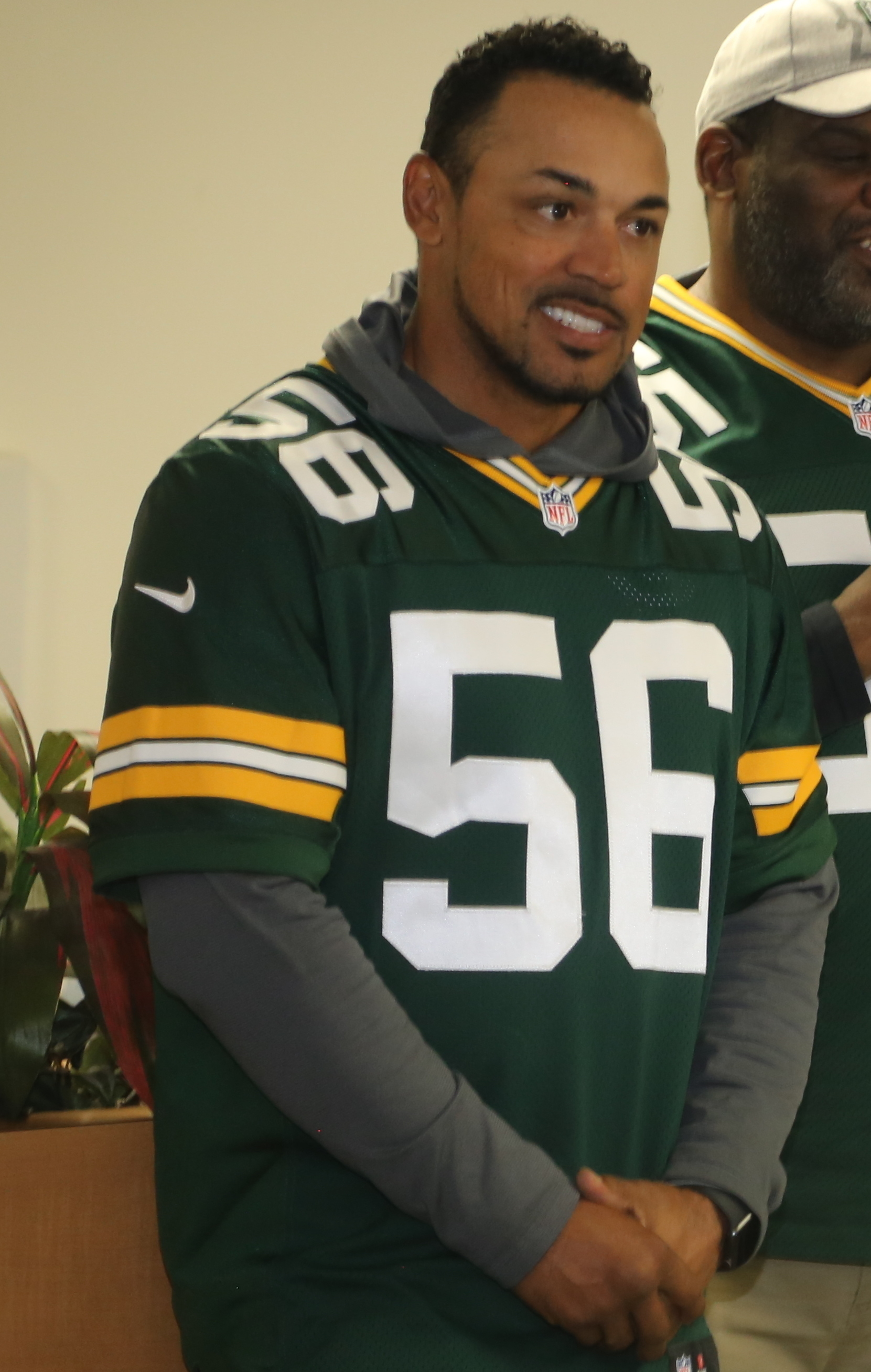
Nick Barnett was the Packers' first-round selection in the 2003 draft.

Green Bay Packers draft selections in 2003Source: Pro-Football-Reference.com
Round	Pick #	Overall	Name	Position	College
1	29	29	Nick Barnett	Linebacker	Oregon St.
3	15	79	Kenny Peterson	Defensive tackle	Ohio St.
5	12	147	James Lee	Defensive tackle	Oregon St.
5	31	166	Hunter Hillenmeyer	Linebacker	Vanderbilt
6	39	212	Brennan Curtin	Tackle	Notre Dame
7	31	245	Chris Johnson	Defensive back	Louisville
7	39	253	DeAndrew Rubin	Wide receiver	South Florida
7	42	256	Carl Ford	Wide receiver	Toledo
7	43	257	Steve Josue	Linebacker	Carson–Newman

== 2004 draft ==
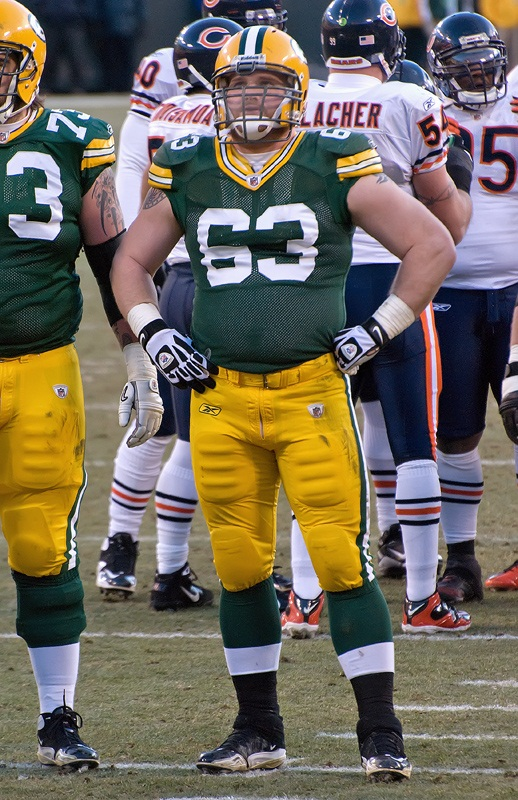
Scott Wells was the Packers' seventh-round selection in the 2004 draft.

Green Bay Packers draft selections in 2004Source: Pro-Football-Reference.com
Round	Pick #	Overall	Name	Position	College
1	25	25	Ahmad Carroll	Defensive back	Arkansas
3	7	70	Joey Thomas	Defensive back	Montana St.
3	9	72	Donnell Washington	Defensive tackle	Clemson
3	24	87	B. J. Sander	Punter	Ohio St.
6	14	179	Corey Williams	Defensive tackle	Arkansas St.
7	50	251	Scott Wells	Guard	Tennessee

== 2005 draft ==
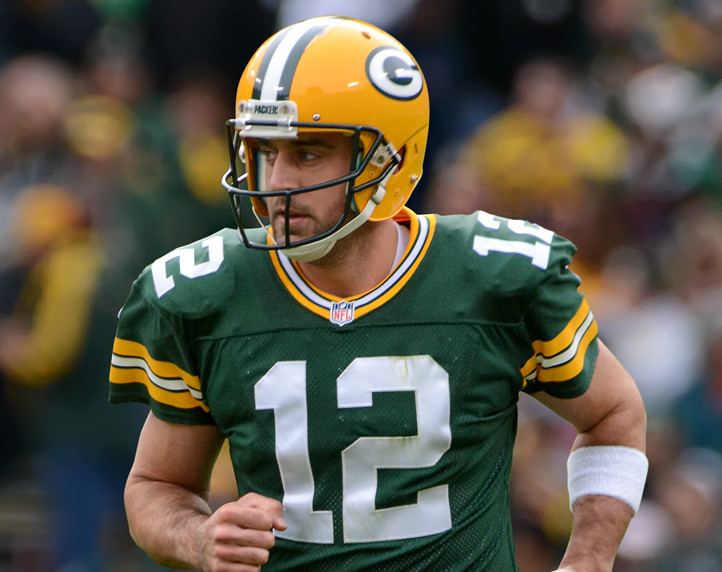
Aaron Rodgers was the Packers' first-round selection in the 2005 draft.

Green Bay Packers draft selections in 2005Source: Pro-Football-Reference.com
Round	Pick #	Overall	Name	Position	College
1	24	24	Aaron Rodgers	Quarterback	California
2	19	51	Nick Collins ^{#}	Defensive back	Bethune-Cookman
2	26	58	Terrence Murphy	Wide receiver	Texas A&M
4	14	115	Marviel Underwood	Defensive back	San Diego St.
4	24	125	Brady Poppinga	Linebacker	BYU
5	7	143	Junius Coston	Guard	North Carolina A&T
5	31	167	Mike Hawkins	Defensive back	Oklahoma
6	6	180	Michael Montgomery	Defensive tackle	Texas A&M
6	21	195	Craig Bragg	Wide receiver	UCLA
7	31	245	Kurt Campbell	Defensive back	Albany
7	32	246	Will Whitticker	Guard	Michigan St.

== 2006 draft ==
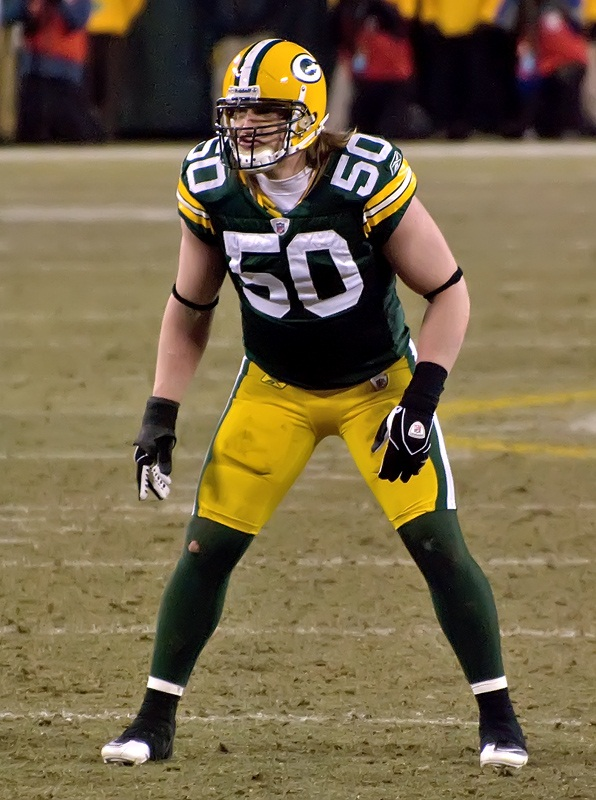
A. J. Hawk was the Packers' first-round selection of the 2006 draft.

Green Bay Packers draft selections in 2006Source: Pro-Football-Reference.com
Round	Pick #	Overall	Name	Position	College
1	5	5	A. J. Hawk	Linebacker	Ohio St.
2	15	47	Daryn Colledge	Tackle	Boise St.
2	20	52	Greg Jennings ^{#}	Wide receiver	Western Michigan
3	3	67	Abdul Hodge	Linebacker	Iowa
3	11	75	Jason Spitz	Guard	Louisville
4	7	104	Cory Rodgers	Wide receiver	TCU
4	18	115	Will Blackmon	Defensive back	Boston College
5	15	148	Ingle Martin	Quarterback	Furman
5	33	165	Tony Moll	Offensive tackle	Nevada
6	14	183	Johnny Jolly	Defensive tackle	Texas A&M
6	16	185	Tyrone Culver	Defensive back	Fresno St.
7	45	253	Dave Tollefson	Defensive end	Northwest Missouri St.

== 2007 draft ==
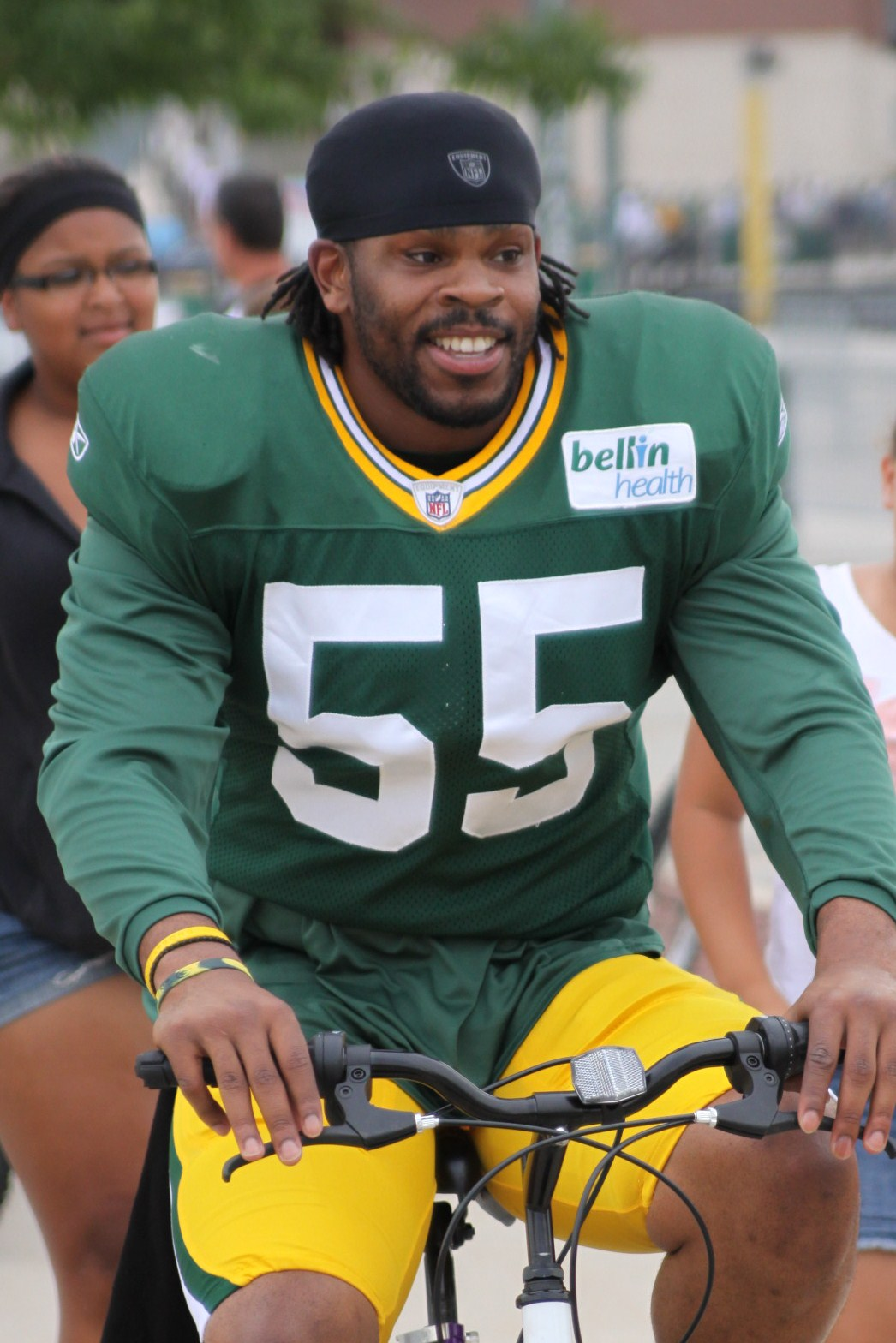
Desmond Bishop was one of the Packers' sixth-round selections in the 2007 draft.

Green Bay Packers draft selections in 2007Source: Pro-Football-Reference.com
Round	Pick #	Overall	Name	Position	College
1	16	16	Justin Harrell	Defensive tackle	Tennessee
2	31	63	Brandon Jackson	Running back	Nebraska
3	14	78	James Jones	Wide receiver	San Jose St.
3	26	89	Aaron Rouse	Defensive back	Virginia Tech
4	20	119	Allen Barbre	Tackle	Missouri Southern
5	20	157	David Clowney	Wide receiver	Virginia Tech
6	17	191	Korey Hall	Linebacker	Boise St.
6	18	192	Desmond Bishop	Linebacker	California
6	19	193	Mason Crosby	Placekicker	Colorado
7	18	228	DeShawn Wynn	Running back	Florida
7	33	243	Clark Harris	Tight end	Rutgers

== 2008 draft ==
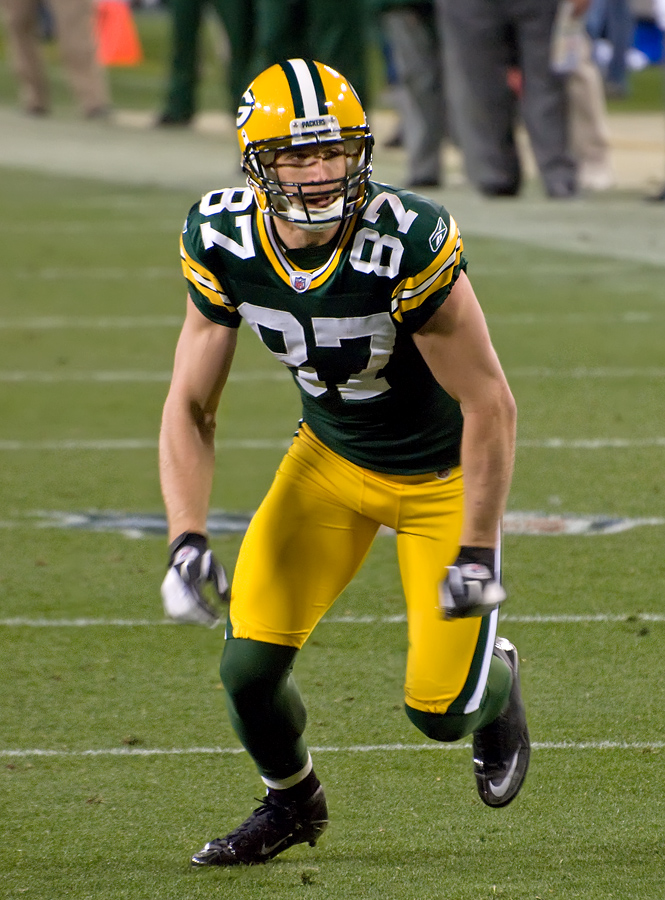
Jordy Nelson was one of the Packers' second-round selections in the 2008 draft.

Green Bay Packers draft selections in 2008Source: Pro-Football-Reference.com
Round	Pick #	Overall	Name	Position	College
2	5	36	Jordy Nelson ^{#}	Wide receiver	Kansas St.
2	25	56	Brian Brohm	Quarterback	Louisville
2	29	60	Pat Lee	Defensive back	Auburn
3	28	91	Jermichael Finley	Tight end	Texas
4	3	102	Jeremy Thompson	Defensive end	Wake Forest
4	36	135	Josh Sitton ^{#}	Tackle	Central Florida
5	15	150	Breno Giacomini	Tackle	Louisville
7	2	209	Matt Flynn	Quarterback	LSU
7	10	217	Brett Swain	Wide receiver	San Diego St.

== 2009 draft ==
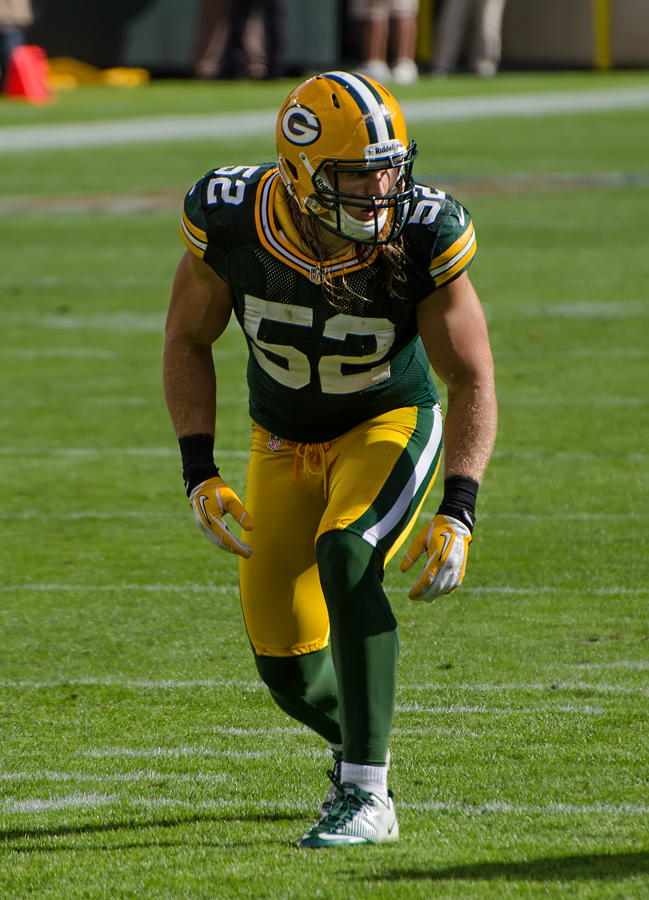
Clay Matthews was one of the Packers' first-round selections in the 2009 draft.

Green Bay Packers draft selections in 2009Source: Pro-Football-Reference.com
Round	Pick #	Overall	Name	Position	College
1	9	9	B. J. Raji	Defensive tackle	Boston College
1	26	26	Clay Matthews III ^{#}	Linebacker	USC
4	9	109	T. J. Lang	Tackle	Eastern Michigan
5	9	145	Quinn Johnson	Running back	LSU
5	25	162	Jamon Meredith	Tackle	South Carolina
6	9	182	Jarius Wynn	Defensive end	Georgia
6	14	187	Brandon Underwood	Defensive back	Cincinnati
7	9	218	Brad Jones	Linebacker	Colorado

== 2010 draft ==
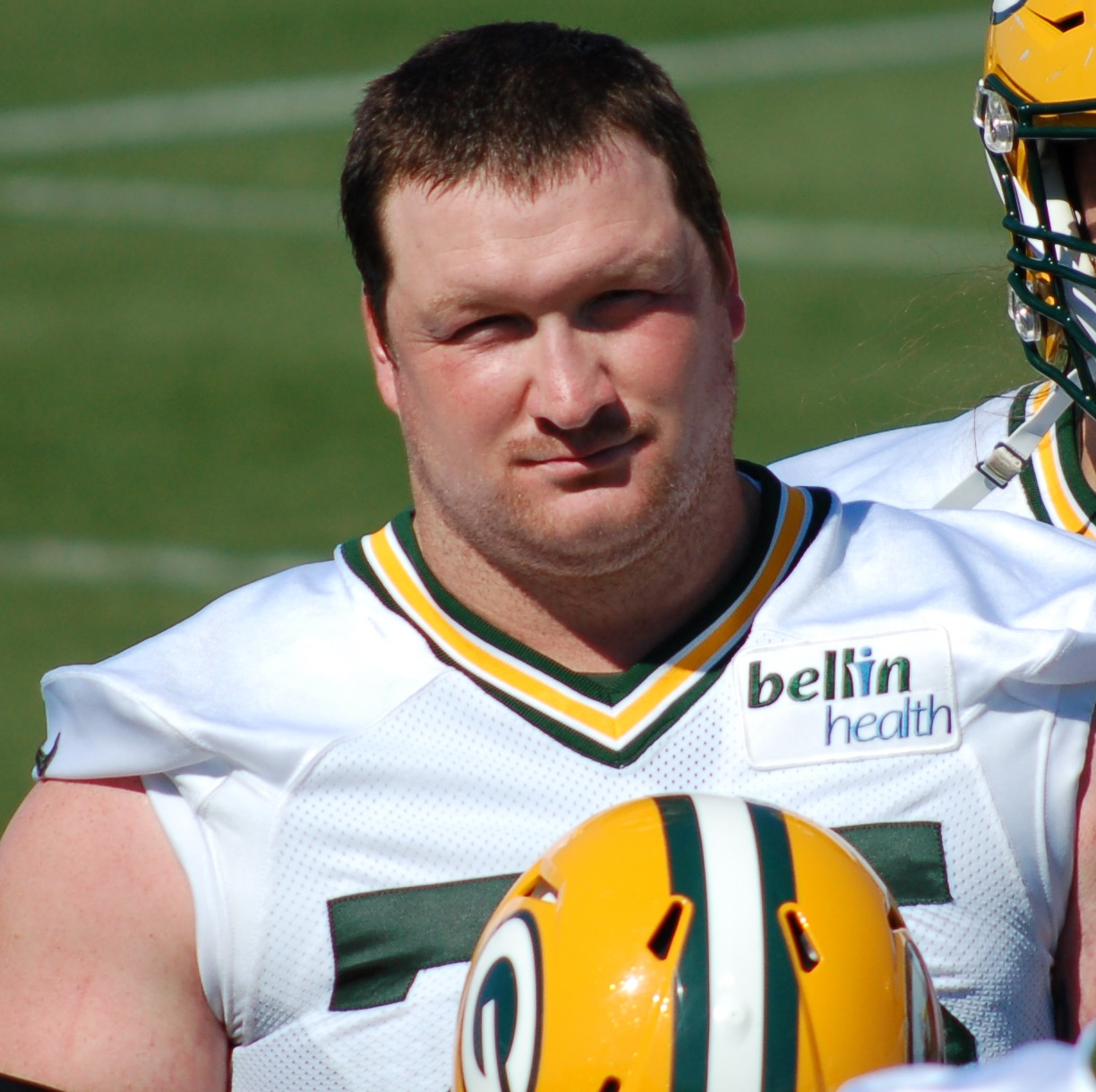
Bryan Bulaga was the Packers' first-round selection in the 2015 draft.

Green Bay Packers draft selections in 2010Source: Pro-Football-Reference.com
Round	Pick #	Overall	Name	Position	College
1	23	23	Bryan Bulaga	Tackle	Iowa
2	24	56	Mike Neal	Defensive end	Purdue
3	7	71	Morgan Burnett	Defensive back	Georgia Tech
5	23	154	Andrew Quarless	Tight end	Penn St.
5	38	169	Marshall Newhouse	Guard	TCU
6	24	193	James Starks	Running back	Buffalo
7	23	230	C. J. Wilson	Defensive end	East Carolina

== 2011 draft ==
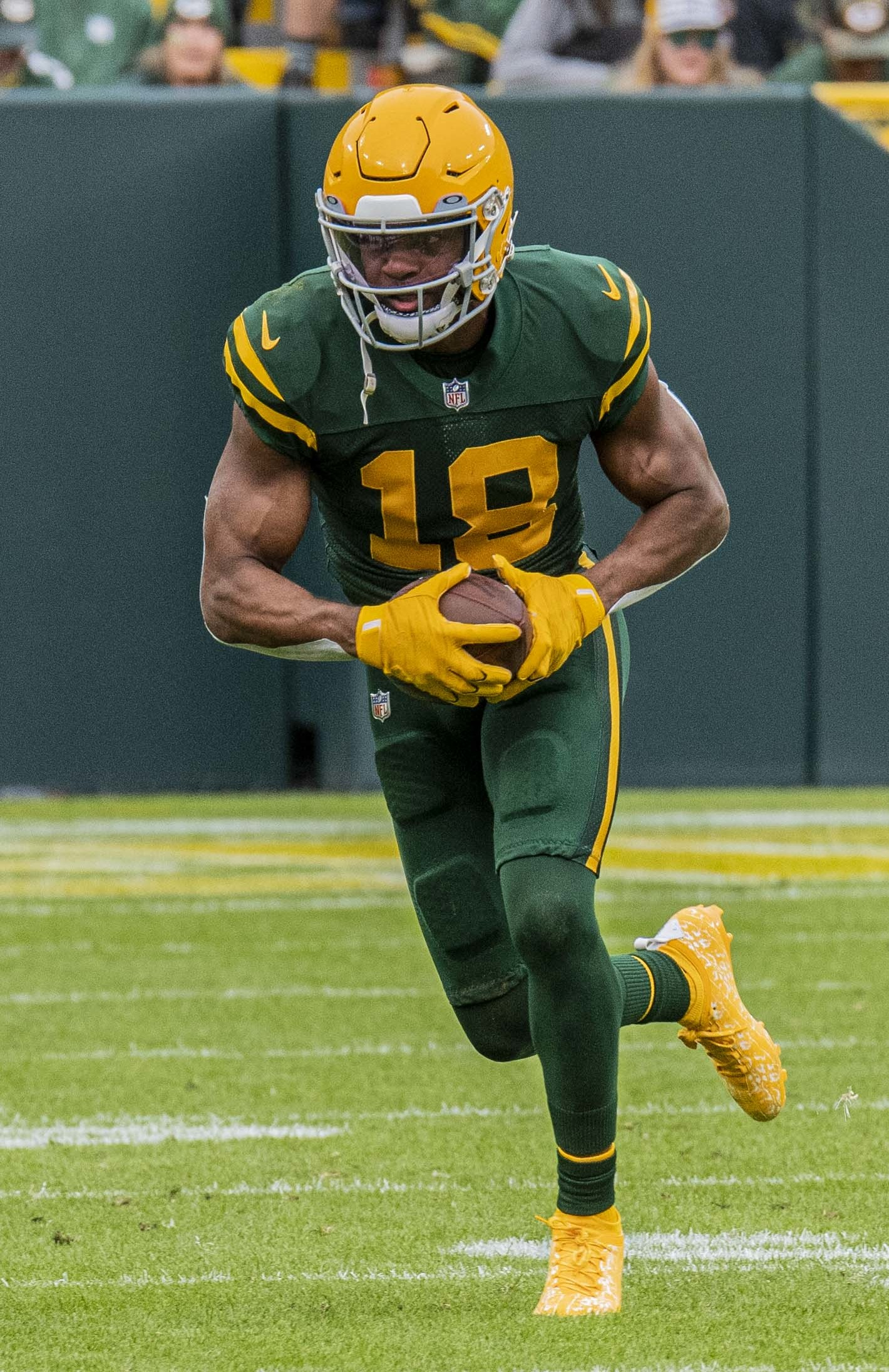
Randall Cobb was the Packers' second-round selection in the 2011 draft.

Green Bay Packers draft selections in 2011Source: Pro-Football-Reference.com
Round	Pick #	Overall	Name	Position	College
1	32	32	Derek Sherrod	Tackle	Mississippi St.
2	32	64	Randall Cobb	Wide receiver	Kentucky
3	32	96	Alex Green	Running back	Hawaii
4	34	131	Davon House	Defensive back	New Mexico St.
5	10	141	D. J. Williams	Tight end	Arkansas
6	14	179	Caleb Schlauderaff	Guard	Utah
6	21	186	D. J. Smith	Linebacker	Appalachian St.
6	32	197	Ricky Elmore	Defensive lineman	Arizona
7	15	218	Ryan Taylor	Tight end	North Carolina
7	30	233	Lawrence Guy	Defensive end	Arizona St.

== 2012 draft ==
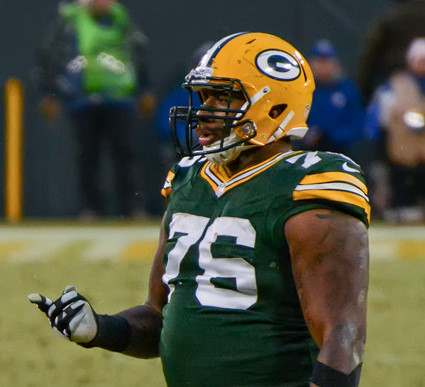
Mike Daniels was one of the Packers' fourth-round selections in the 2012 draft

Green Bay Packers draft selections in 2012Source: Pro-Football-Reference.com
Round	Pick #	Overall	Name	Position	College
1	28	28	Nick Perry	Defensive end	USC
2	19	51	Jerel Worthy	Defensive tackle	Michigan St.
2	30	62	Casey Hayward	Defensive back	Vanderbilt
4	37	132	Mike Daniels	Defensive tackle	Iowa
4	38	133	Jerron McMillian	Defensive back	Maine
5	28	163	Terrell Manning	Linebacker	North Carolina St.
7	34	241	Andrew Datko	Tackle	Florida St.
7	36	243	B. J. Coleman	Quarterback	Chattanooga

== 2013 draft ==
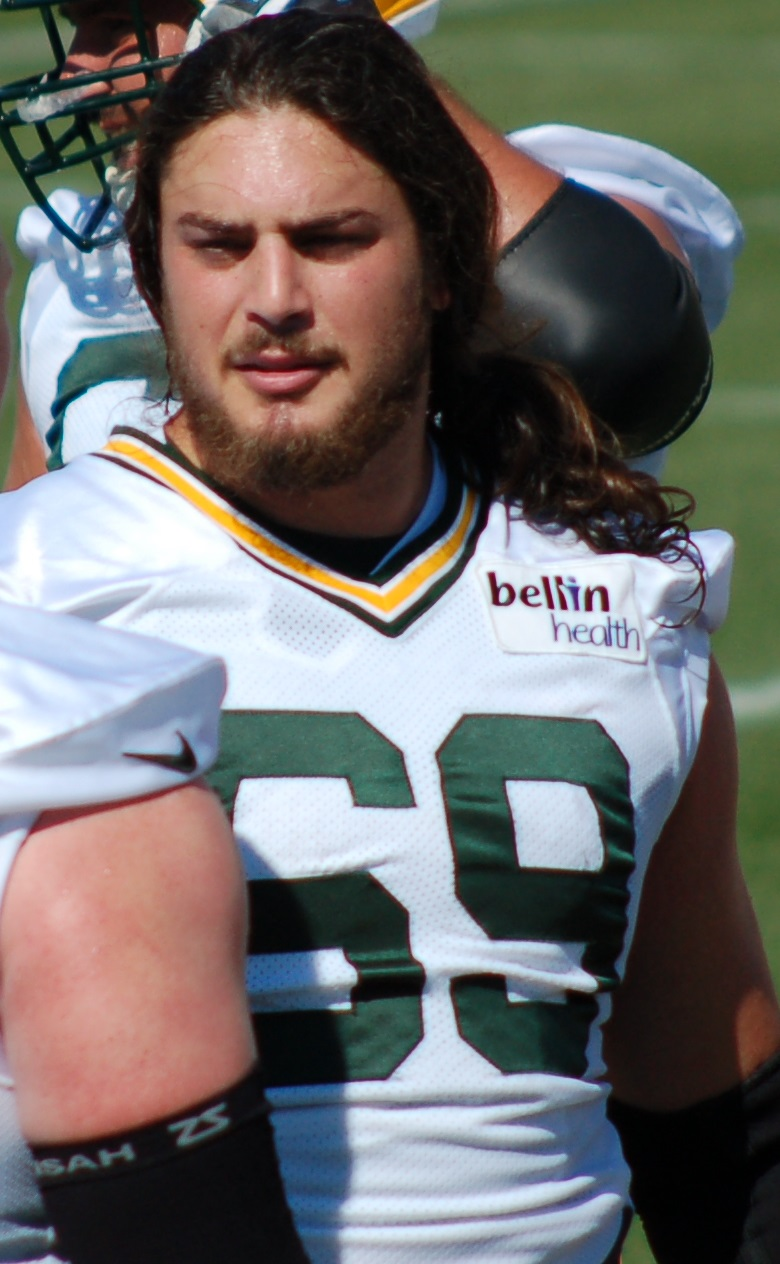
David Bakhtiari was one of the Packers' fourth-round selections in the 2013 draft.

Green Bay Packers draft selections in 2013Source: Pro-Football-Reference.com
Round	Pick #	Overall	Name	Position	College
1	26	26	Datone Jones	Defensive end	UCLA
2	29	61	Eddie Lacy	Running back	Alabama
4	12	109	David Bakhtiari	Tackle	Colorado
4	25	122	J. C. Tretter	Tackle	Cornell
4	28	125	Johnathan Franklin	Running back	UCLA
5	26	159	Micah Hyde	Defensive back	Iowa
5	34	167	Josh Boyd	Defensive end	Mississippi St.
6	25	193	Nate Palmer	Linebacker	Illinois St.
7	10	216	Charles Johnson	Wide receiver	Grand Valley St.
7	18	224	Kevin Dorsey	Wide receiver	Maryland
7	26	232	Sam Barrington	Linebacker	South Florida

== 2014 draft ==
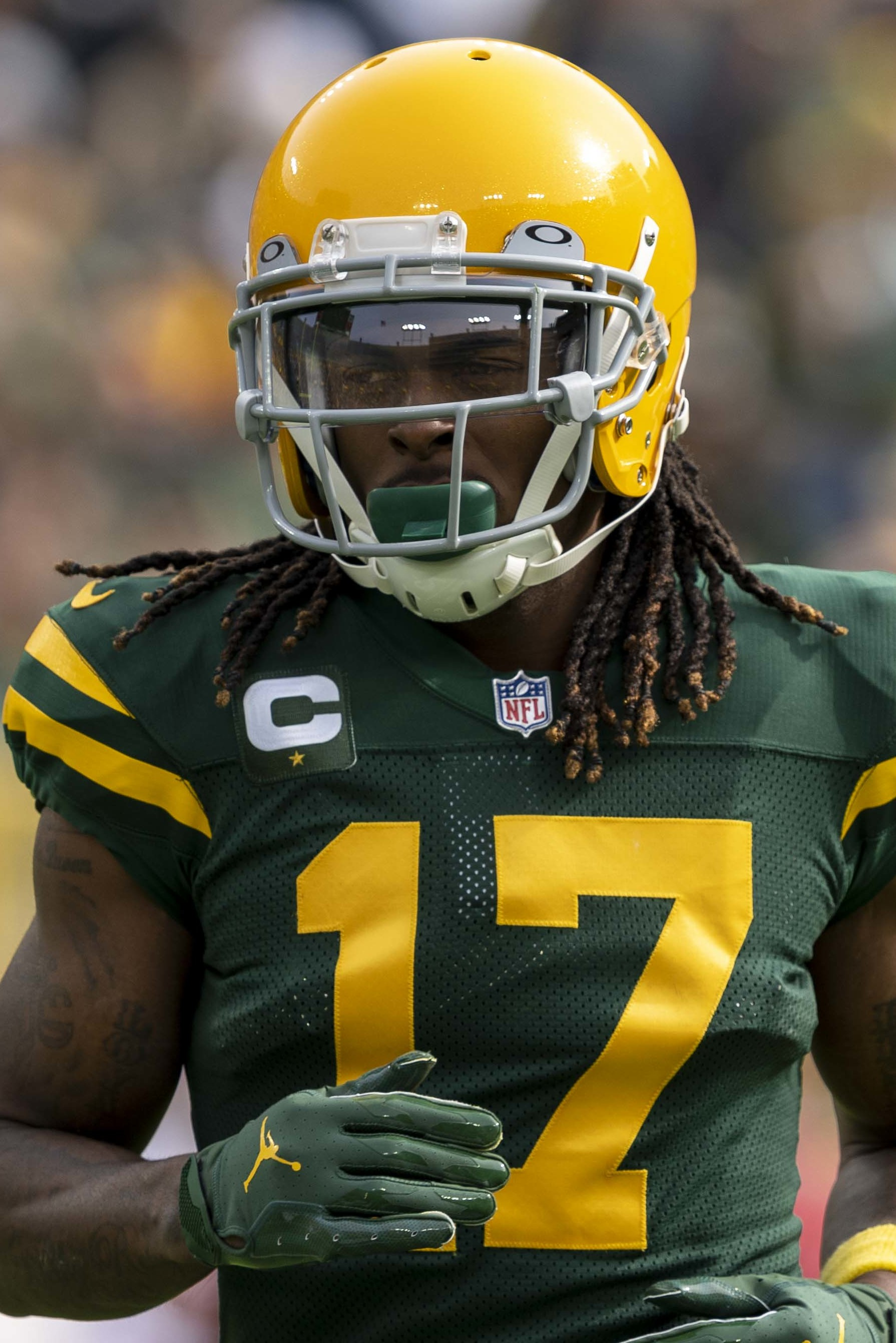
Davante Adams was the Packers' second-round selection in the 2014 draft.

Green Bay Packers draft selections in 2014Source: Pro-Football-Reference.com
Round	Pick #	Overall	Name	Position	College
1	21	21	Ha Ha Clinton-Dix	Defensive back	Alabama
2	21	53	Davante Adams	Wide receiver	Fresno St.
3	21	85	Khyri Thornton	Defensive tackle	Southern Miss
3	34	98	Richard Rodgers	Tight end	California
4	21	121	Carl Bradford	Linebacker	Arizona St.
5	21	161	Corey Linsley	Center	Ohio St.
5	36	176	Jared Abbrederis	Wide receiver	Wisconsin
6	21	197	Demetri Goodson	Defensive back	Baylor
7	21	236	Jeff Janis	Wide receiver	Saginaw Valley St.

== 2015 draft ==
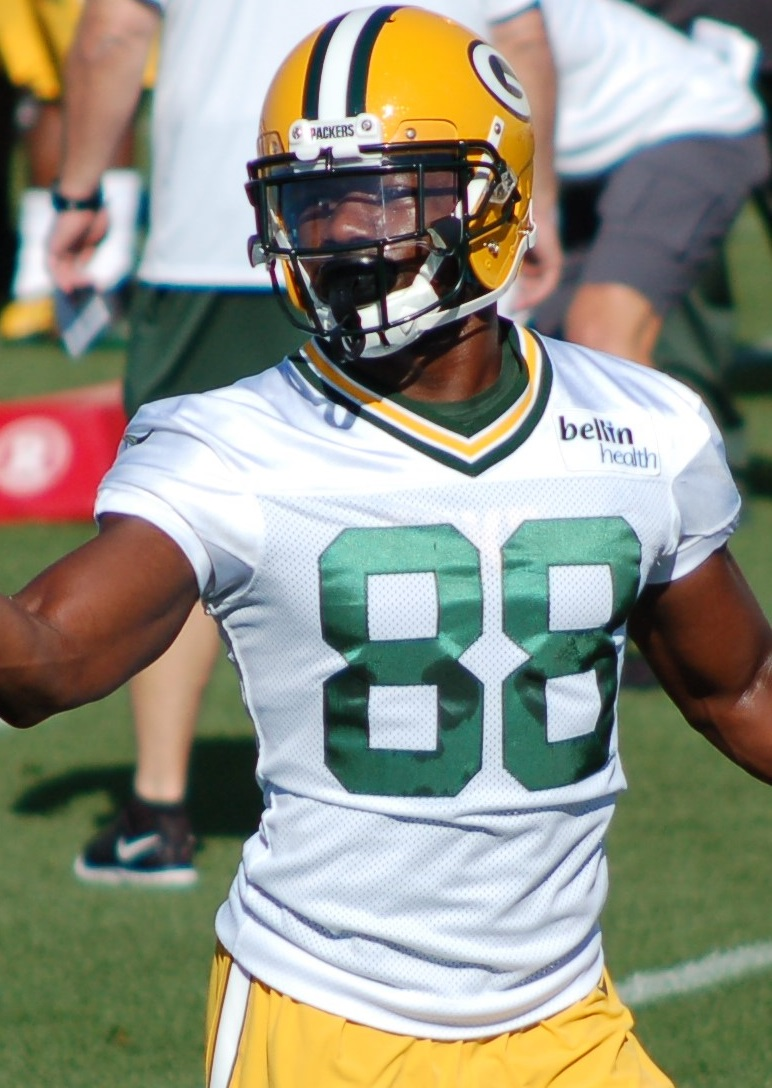
Ty Montgomery was the Packers' third-round selection in the 2015 draft.

Green Bay Packers draft selections in 2015Source: Pro-Football-Reference.com
Round	Pick #	Overall	Name	Position	College
1	30	30	Damarious Randall	Safety	Arizona St.
2	30	62	Quinten Rollins	Cornerback	Miami (OH)
3	30	94	Ty Montgomery	Wide receiver	Stanford
4	30	129	Jake Ryan	Outside linebacker	Michigan
5	11	147	Brett Hundley	Quarterback	UCLA
6	30	206	Aaron Ripkowski	Fullback	Oklahoma
6	34	210	Christian Ringo	Defensive end	Louisiana-Lafayette
6	37	213	Kennard Backman	Tight end	UAB

== 2016 draft ==
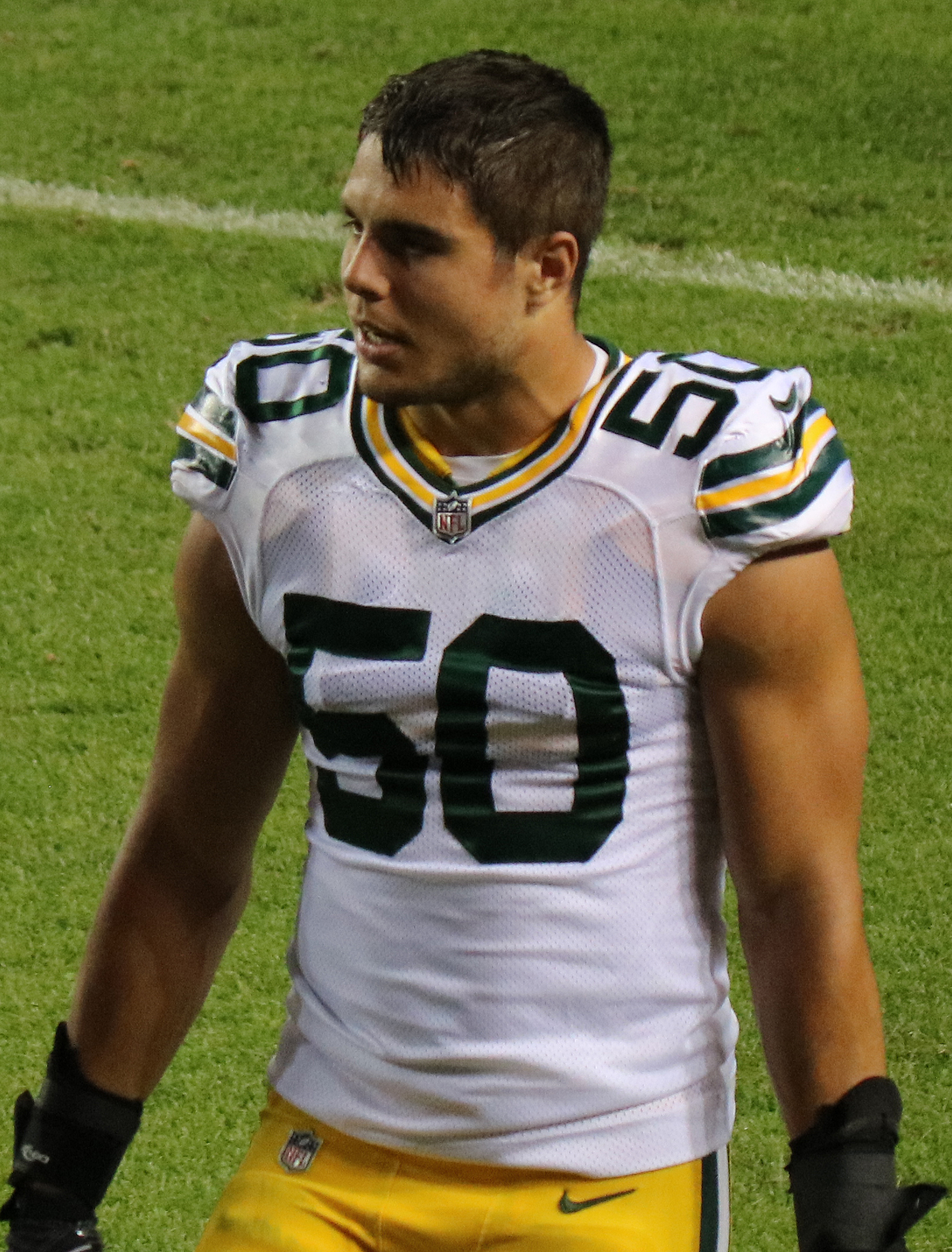
Blake Martinez was one of the Packers' fourth-round selections in the 2016 draft.

Green Bay Packers draft selections in 2016Source: Pro-Football-Reference.com
Round	Pick #	Overall	Name	Position	College
1	27	27	Kenny Clark	Defensive tackle	UCLA
2	17	48	Jason Spriggs	Tackle	Indiana
3	25	88	Kyler Fackrell	Linebacker	Utah St.
4	33	131	Blake Martinez	Linebacker	Stanford
4	39	137	Dean Lowry	Defensive end	Northwestern
5	26	163	Trevor Davis	Wide receiver	California
6	25	200	Kyle Murphy	Tackle	Stanford

== 2017 draft ==
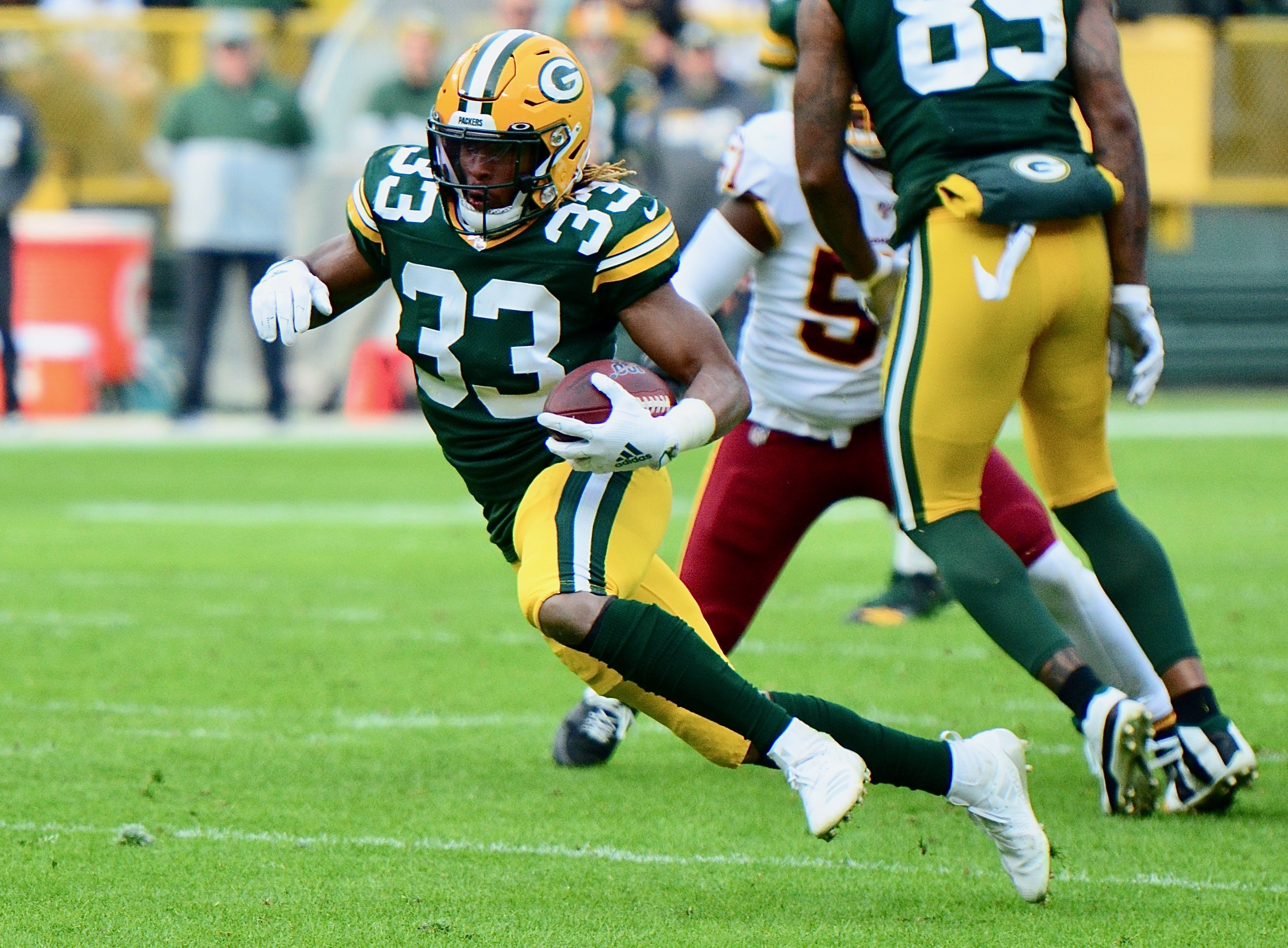
Aaron Jones was the Packers' sixth-round selection in the 2017 draft.

Green Bay Packers draft selections in 2017Source: Pro-Football-Reference.com
Round	Pick #	Overall	Name	Position	College
2	1	33	Kevin King	Cornerback	Washington
2	29	61	Josh Jones	Safety	North Carolina St.
3	29	93	Montravius Adams	Defensive tackle	Auburn
4	1	108	Vince Biegel	Linebacker	Wisconsin
4	28	134	Jamaal Williams	Running back	BYU
5	32	175	DeAngelo Yancey	Wide receiver	Purdue
5	39	182	Aaron Jones	Running back	UTEP
6	29	212	Kofi Amichia	Center	South Florida
7	20	238	Devante Mays	Running back	Utah St.
7	29	247	Malachi Dupre	Wide receiver	LSU

== 2018 draft ==
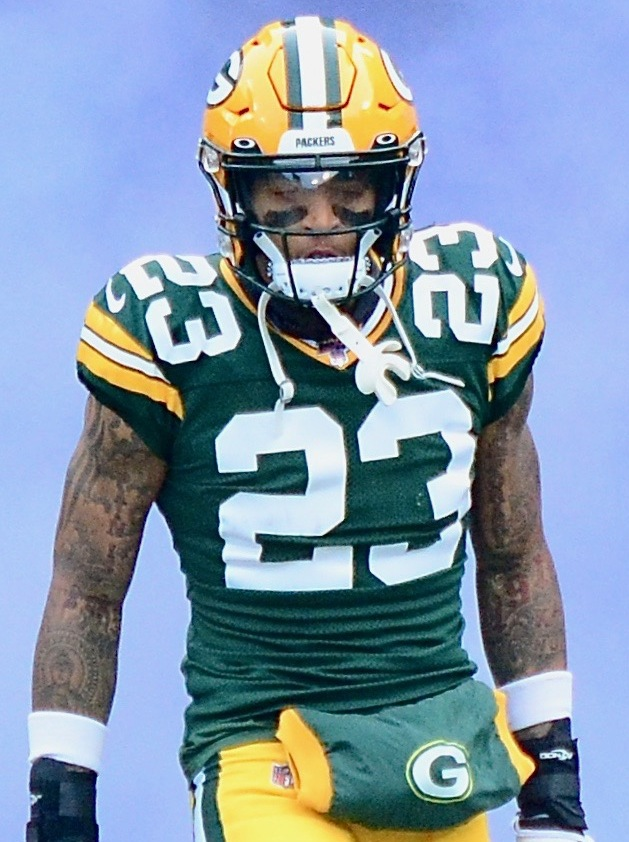
Jaire Alexander was the Packers' first-round selection in the 2018 draft.

Green Bay Packers draft selections in 2018Source: Pro-Football-Reference.com
Round	Pick #	Overall	Name	Position	College
1	18	18	Jaire Alexander	Cornerback	Louisville
2	13	45	Josh Jackson	Cornerback	Iowa
3	24	88	Oren Burks	Inside linebacker	Vanderbilt
4	33	133	J'Mon Moore	Wide receiver	Missouri
5	1	138	Cole Madison	Guard	Washington St.
5	35	172	J. K. Scott	Punter	Alabama
5	37	174	Marquez Valdes-Scantling	Wide receiver	South Florida
6	33	207	Equanimeous St. Brown	Wide receiver	Notre Dame
7	14	232	James Looney	Defensive end	California
7	21	239	Hunter Bradley	Long snapper	Mississippi St.
7	30	248	Kendall Donnerson	Outside linebacker	SE Missouri St.

== 2019 draft ==
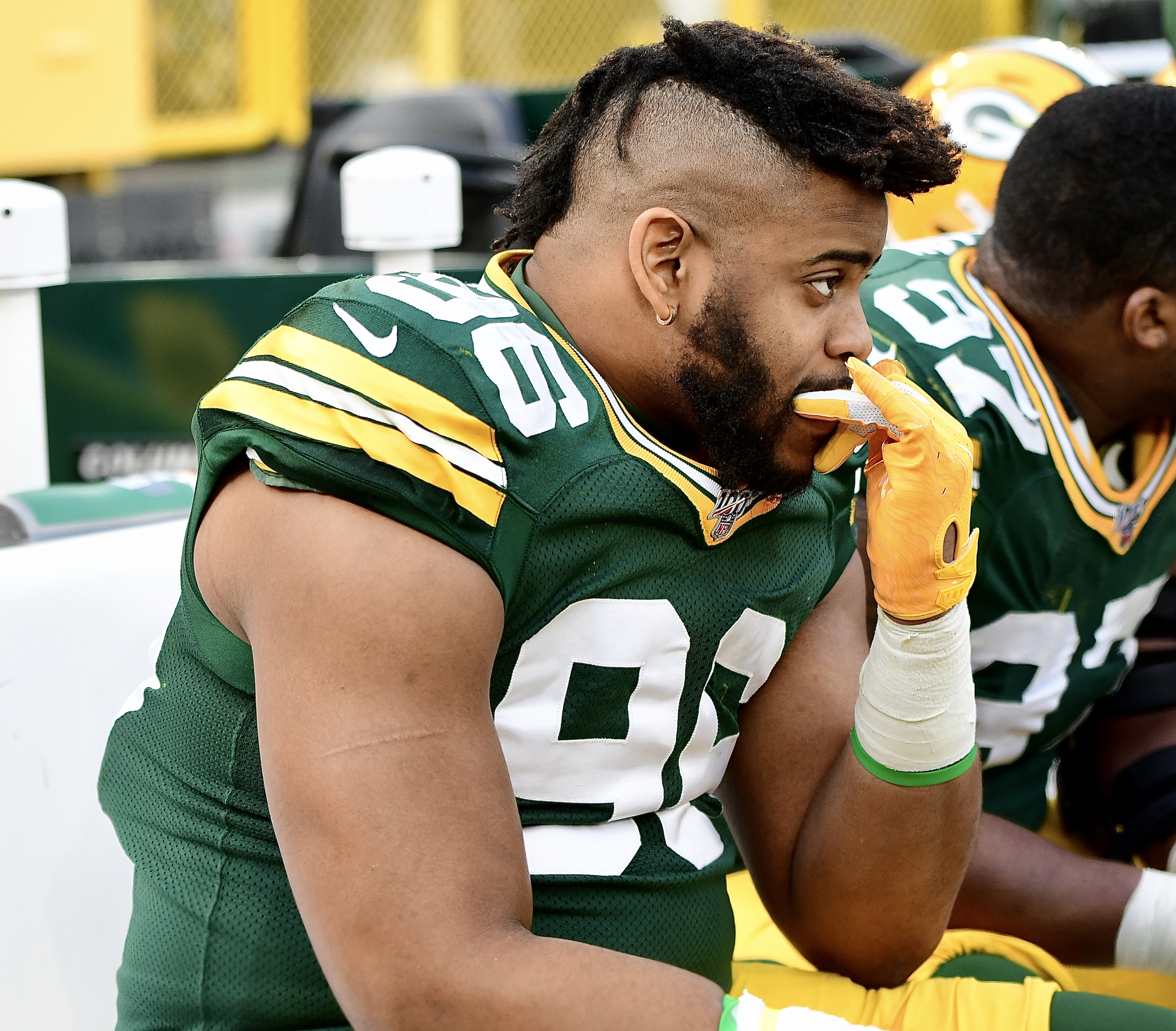
Kingsley Keke was the Packers' fifth-round selection in the 2019 draft

Green Bay Packers draft selections in 2019Source: Pro-Football-Reference.com
Round	Pick #	Overall	Name	Position	College
1	12	12	Rashan Gary	Linebacker	Michigan
1	21	21	Darnell Savage Jr.	Safety	Maryland
2	12	44	Elgton Jenkins	Center	Mississippi St.
3	12	75	Jace Sternberger	Tight end	Texas A&M
5	12	150	Kingsley Keke	Defensive tackle	Texas A&M
6	12	185	Ka'dar Hollman	Cornerback	Toledo
6	22	194	Dexter Williams	Running back	Notre Dame
7	12	226	Ty Summers	Linebacker	TCU

== 2020 draft ==
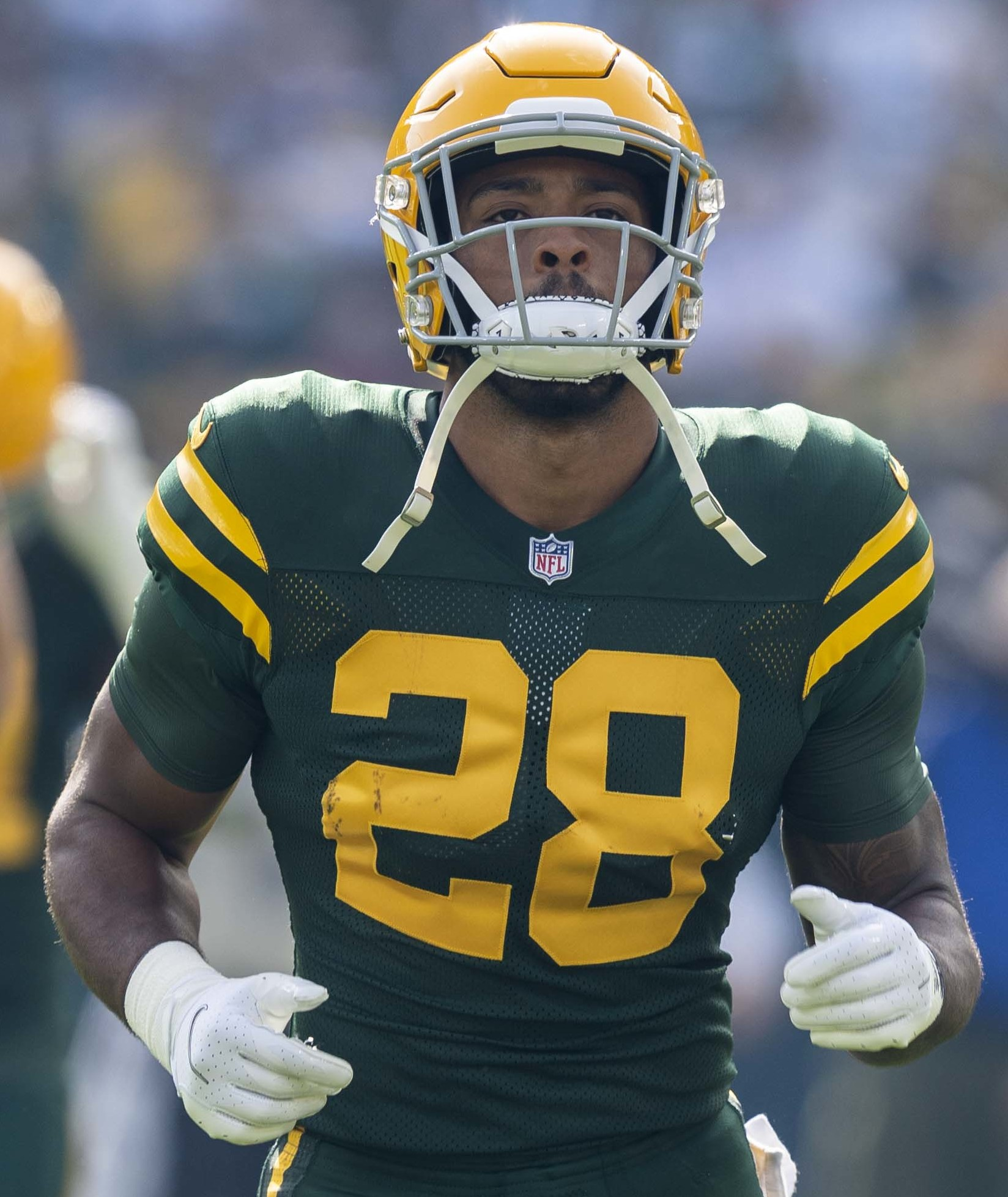
A. J. Dillon was the Packers' second-round selection in the 2020 draft.

Green Bay Packers draft selections in 2020Source: Pro-Football-Reference.com
Round	Pick #	Overall	Name	Position	College
1	26	26	Jordan Love	Quarterback	Utah St.
2	30	62	A. J. Dillon	Running back	Boston College
3	30	94	Josiah Deguara	Tight end	Cincinnati
5	30	175	Kamal Martin	Linebacker	Minnesota
6	13	192	Jon Runyan	Tackle	Michigan
6	29	208	Jake Hanson	Center	Oregon
6	30	209	Simon Stepaniak	Tackle	Indiana
7	22	236	Vernon Scott	Safety	TCU
7	28	242	Jonathan Garvin	Defensive end	Miami (FL)

== 2021 draft ==
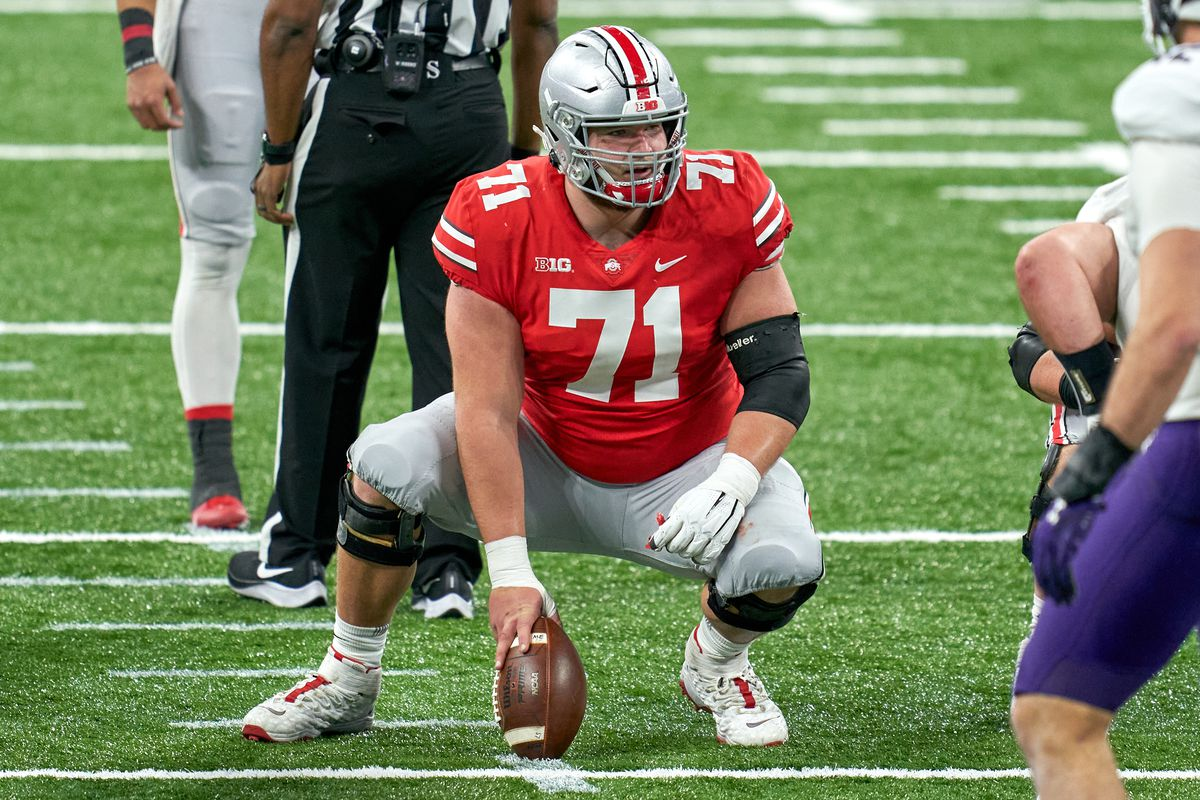
Josh Myers, shown here in college, was the Packers' second-round selections in the 2021 draft.

Green Bay Packers draft selections in 2021Source: Pro-Football-Reference.com
Round	Pick #	Overall	Name	Position	College
1	29	29	Eric Stokes	Defensive back	Georgia
2	30	62	Josh Myers	Center	Ohio St.
3	22	85	Amari Rodgers	Wide receiver	Clemson
4	37	142	Royce Newman	Guard	Ole Miss
5	29	173	Tedarrell Slaton	Defensive lineman	Florida
5	34	178	Shemar Jean-Charles	Defensive back	Appalachian St.
6	30	214	Cole Van Lanen	Guard	Wisconsin
6	36	220	Isaiah McDuffie	Linebacker	Boston College
7	29	256	Kylin Hill	Running back	Mississippi St.

== 2022 draft ==
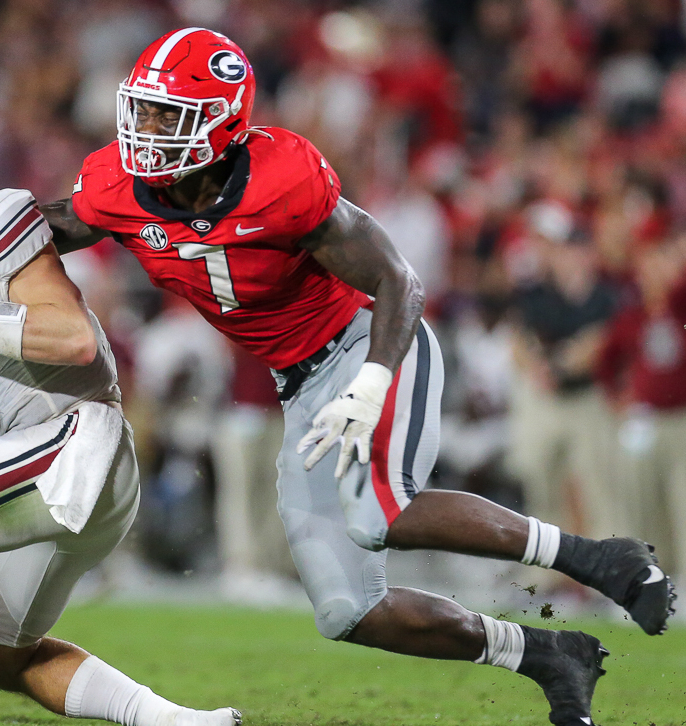
Quay Walker was one of the Packers' first-round selections in the 2022 draft.

Green Bay Packers draft selections in 2022Source: Pro-Football-Reference.com
Round	Pick #	Overall	Name	Position	College
1	22	22	Quay Walker	Linebacker	Georgia
1	28	28	Devonte Wyatt	Defensive tackle	Georgia
2	2	34	Christian Watson	Wide receiver	North Dakota St.
3	28	92	Sean Rhyan	Offensive lineman	UCLA
4	27	132	Romeo Doubs	Wide receiver	Nevada
4	35	140	Zach Tom	Offensive lineman	Wake Forest
5	36	179	Kingsley Enagbare	Defensive end	South Carolina
7	7	228	Tariq Carpenter	Defensive back	Georgia Tech
7	13	234	Jonathan Ford	Defensive tackle	Miami (FL)
7	28	249	Rasheed Walker	Offensive lineman	Penn St.
7	37	258	Samori Toure	Wide receiver	Nebraska

== 2023 draft ==
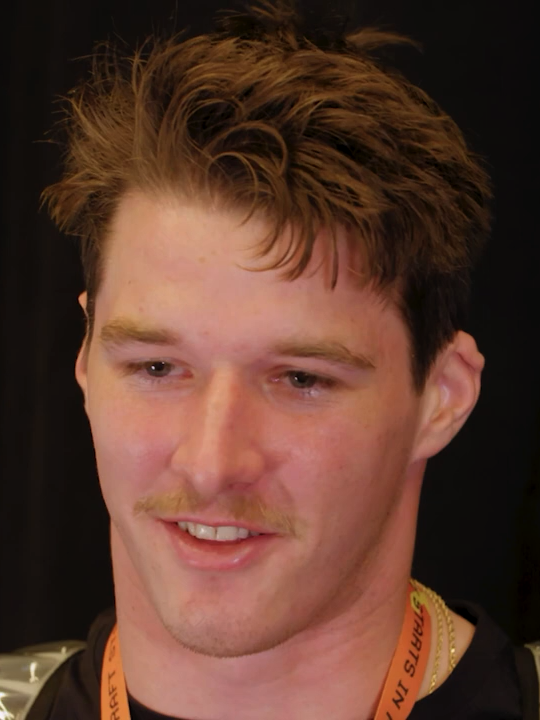
Luke Musgrave was one of the Packers' second-round selections in the 2023 draft.

Green Bay Packers draft selections in 2023Source: Pro-Football-Reference.com
Round	Pick #	Overall	Name	Position	College
1	13	13	Lukas Van Ness	Defensive lineman	Iowa
2	11	42	Luke Musgrave	Tight end	Oregon St.
2	19	50	Jayden Reed	Wide receiver	Michigan St.
3	15	78	Tucker Kraft	Tight end	South Dakota St.
4	14	116	Colby Wooden	Defensive end	Auburn
5	14	149	Sean Clifford	Quarterback	Penn St.
5	24	159	Dontayvion Wicks	Wide receiver	Virginia
6	2	179	Karl Brooks	Defensive tackle	Bowling Green
6	30	207	Anders Carlson	Placekicker	Auburn
7	15	232	Carrington Valentine	Defensive back	Kentucky
7	18	235	Lew Nichols III	Running back	Central Michigan
7	25	242	Anthony Johnson Jr.	Defensive back	Iowa St.
7	39	256	Grant DuBose	Wide receiver	Charlotte

== 2024 draft ==
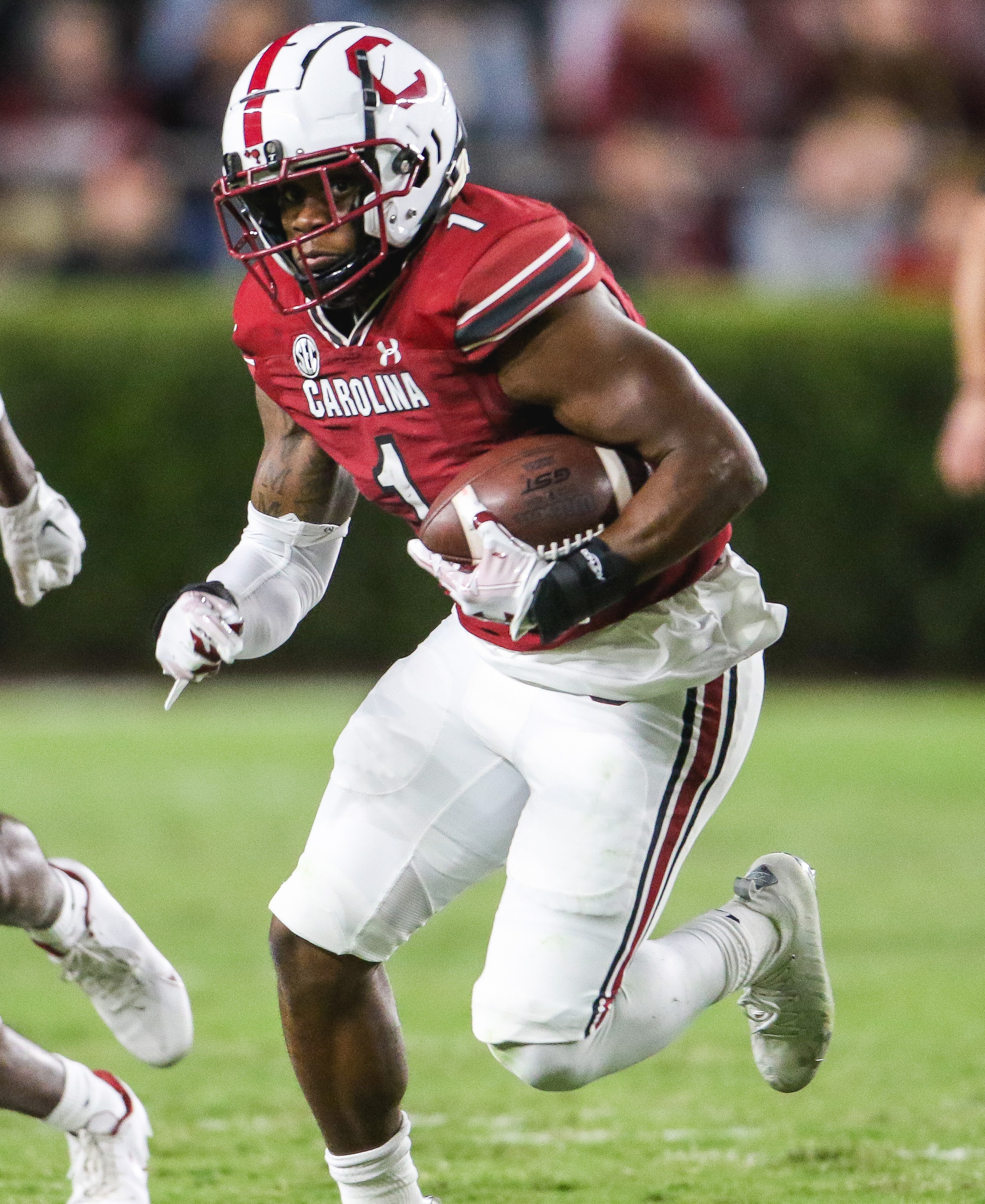
MarShawn Lloyd was one of the Packers' third-round selections in the 2024 draft.

Green Bay Packers draft selections in 2024Source: Pro-Football-Reference.com
Round	Pick #	Overall	Name	Position	College
1	25	25	Jordan Morgan	Offensive lineman	Arizona
2	13	45	Edgerrin Cooper	Linebacker	Texas A&M
2	26	58	Javon Bullard	Defensive back	Georgia
3	25	88	MarShawn Lloyd	Running back	USC
3	28	91	Ty'Ron Hopper	Linebacker	Missouri
4	11	111	Evan Williams	Defensive back	Oregon
5	28	163	Jacob Monk	Offensive lineman	Duke
5	34	169	Kitan Oladapo	Defensive back	Oregon St.
6	26	202	Travis Glover	Tackle	Georgia St.
7	25	245	Michael Pratt	Quarterback	Tulane
7	35	255	Kalen King	Cornerback	Penn St.

== 2025 draft ==
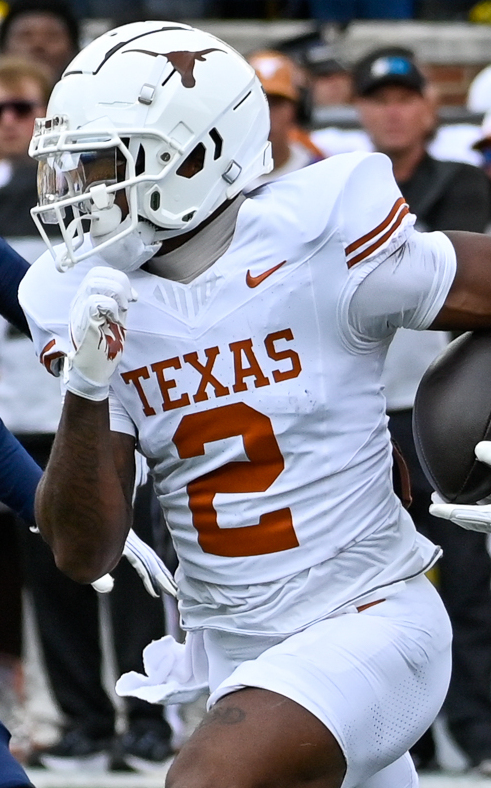
Matthew Golden was the first wide receiver drafted in the first round by the Packers since Javon Walker in 2002.

Green Bay Packers draft selections in 2025Source: Pro-Football-Reference.com
Round	Pick #	Overall	Name	Position	College
1	23	23	Matthew Golden	Wide receiver	Texas
2	22	54	Anthony Belton	Offensive tackle	NC State
3	23	87	Savion Williams	Wide receiver	TCU
4	22	123	Barryn Sorrell	Defensive end	Texas
5	21	160	Collin Oliver	Linebacker	Oklahoma State
6	22	200	Warren Brinson	Defensive tackle	Georgia
7	21	239	Micah Robinson	Cornerback	Tulane
7	33	251	John Williams	Offensive tackle	Cincinnati

== 2026 draft ==
Green Bay Packers draft selections in 2026Source: Pro-Football-Reference.com
Round	Pick #	Overall	Name	Position	College
2	20	52	Brandon Cisse	Cornerback	South Carolina
3	20	84	Chris McClellan	Defensive tackle	Missouri
4	20	120	Dani Dennis-Sutton	Defensive end	Penn State
5	13	153	Jager Burton	Center	Kentucky
6	20	201	Domani Jackson	Cornerback	Alabama
6	20	216	Trey Smack	Kicker	Florida

== See also ==
- Lists of Green Bay Packers players
