= 1981 Green Bay Packers season =

NFL team season

- Head coach: Bart Starr
- Home stadium: Lambeau Field; Milwaukee County Stadium

Results
- Record: 8–8
- Division place: 3rd Central
- Playoffs: Did not qualify

The 1981 Green Bay Packers season was their 63rd season overall and their 61st in the National Football League. The team posted an 8–8 record under coach Bart Starr, earning them a third-place finish in the NFC Central division. Led by the defense the Packers were number one in turnovers forced and number 9th overall. The offense did improve but still finished in the bottom half of the league. Needing a Giants loss or an Eagles win during the final week of the regular season (due to tiebreakers), the Packers gained control of their destiny at earning the final Wild Card spot by winning in their last regular season game but were defeated by the New York Jets 28–3. The Packers managed only 84 total yards against the Jets.

== Offseason ==
=== NFL draft ===
1981 Green Bay Packers draft
Round	Pick	Player	Position	College	Notes
1	6	Rich Campbell	Quarterback	California	
2	35	Gary Lewis	Tight end	Texas–Arlington	
3	62	Ray Stachowicz	Punter	Michigan State	
4	105	Richard Turner	Defensive tackle	Oklahoma	
5	117	Byron Braggs	Defensive end	Alabama	
7	172	Bill Whitaker	Safety	Missouri	
8	200	Larry Werts	Linebacker	Jackson State	
9	227	Tim Huffman	Guard	Notre Dame	
10	255	Nickie Hall	Quarterback	Tulane	
11	282	Forrest Valora	Linebacker	Oklahoma	
12	311	Cliff Lewis	Linebacker	Southern Miss	
Made roster

=== Undrafted free agents ===
1981 undrafted free agents of note
Player	Position	College
Craig Chrest	Wide receiver	Wisconsin–La Crosse
Bill Kazmaier	Guard	Wisconsin
Rick Kehr	Guard	Carthage
Greg Knafelc	Tight end	Notre Dame
David Petway	Safety	Northern Illinois
Randy Scott	Linebacker	Alabama
Robert Shackelford	Guard	St. Norbert
Pete Thompson	Wide receiver	Carroll (MT)

== Personnel ==
=== Staff ===
1981 Green Bay Packers staff
Front office: President – Dominic Olejniczak; Vice president – Robert J. Parins; Corporate assistant to the president – Bob Harlan; Director of player personnel – Dick Corrick; Head coaches: Head coach – Bart Starr; Offensive coaches: Quarterbacks/offensive backs – Zeke Bratkowski; Receivers – Lew Carpenter; Offensive line – Ernie McMillan; Special assistant – Pete Kettela	Defensive coaches: Defensive coordinator – John Meyer; Defensive line – Doc Urich; Linebackers – John Marshall; Defensive backs – Ross Fichtner; Special teams coaches: Special teams – Dick Rehbein

=== Roster ===
1981 Green Bay Packers roster
Quarterbacks (QB): 19 Rich Campbell; 12 Lynn Dickey; 17 David Whitehurst; Running backs (RB): 31 Gerry Ellis; 25 Harlan Huckleby; 33 Jim Jensen; 34 Terdell Middleton; Wide receivers (WR): 88 Ron Cassidy; 83 John Jefferson; 80 James Lofton; 84 Fred Nixon; Tight ends (TE): 82 Paul Coffman; 81 Gary Lewis	Offensive linemen (OL): 61 Charlie Ane C; 69 Leotis Harris G; 64 Syd Kitson G; 68 Greg Koch T; 79 Mark Koncar T; 54 Larry McCarren C; 72 Brad Oates T; 76 Tim Stokes T; 71 Arland Thompson G; Defensive linemen (DL): 73 Byron Braggs DE; 77 Mike Butler DE; 90 Ezra Johnson DE; 63 Terry Jones NT; 78 Casey Merrill DE; 75 Richard Turner NT	Linebackers (LB): 60 Kurt Allerman ILB; 59 John Anderson OLB; 52 George Cumby ILB; 53 Mike Douglass OLB; 56 Cliff Lewis OLB; 51 Guy Prather OLB; 55 Randy Scott ILB; 50 Rich Wingo ILB; Defensive backs (DB): 23 Maurice Harvey FS; 38 Estus Hood CB; 22 Mark Lee CB; 37 Mark Murphy SS; 29 Mike McCoy CB; 47 David Petway FS; 30 Bill Whitaker SS; Special teams (ST): 16 Ray Stachowicz P; 10 Jan Stenerud K	Reserve: 62 Buddy Aydelette T (IR); -- Chris Godfrey DE (IR); 57 Derrel Gofourth G (IR); 24 Johnnie Gray S (IR); 11 Nickie Hall QB (IR); 74 Tim Huffman G (IR); -- Mike Hunt LB (Ret.); 40 Eddie Lee Ivery RB (IR); 21 Mike Jolly S (IR); 48 Willard Reaves RB (IR); 70 Paul Rudzinski LB (IR); 42 Tim Smith S (Ret.); 67 Karl Swanke T (IR); 87 John Thompson TE (IR); 26 Eric Torkelson RB (IR); Rookies in italics 45 active

== Regular season ==
=== Schedule ===
Week	Date	Opponent	Result	Venue	Attendance
1	September 6	at Chicago Bears	W 16–9	Soldier Field	62,411
2	September 13	Atlanta Falcons	L 17–31	Lambeau Field	55,382
3	September 20	at Los Angeles Rams	L 23–35	Anaheim Stadium	61,286
4	September 27	Minnesota Vikings	L 13–30	Milwaukee County Stadium	55,012
5	October 4	at New York Giants	W 27–14	Giants Stadium	73,684
6	October 11	Tampa Bay Buccaneers	L 10–21	Lambeau Field	55,264
7	October 18	San Francisco 49ers	L 3–13	Milwaukee County Stadium	50,171
8	October 25	at Detroit Lions	L 27–31	Pontiac Silverdome	76,063
9	November 1	Seattle Seahawks	W 34–24	Lambeau Field	49,467
10	November 8	New York Giants	W 26–24	Milwaukee County Stadium	54,138
11	November 15	Chicago Bears	W 21–17	Lambeau Field	55,338
12	November 22	at Tampa Bay Buccaneers	L 3–37	Tampa Stadium	63,251
13	November 29	at Minnesota Vikings	W 35–23	Metropolitan Stadium	46,025
14	December 6	Detroit Lions	W 31–17	Lambeau Field	54,481
15	December 13	at New Orleans Saints	W 35–7	Louisiana Superdome	45,518
16	December 20	at New York Jets	L 3–28	Shea Stadium	56,340

=== Game summaries ===
==== Week 1 ====
Team	1	2	3	4	Total
• Packers	7	6	0	3	16
Bears	0	0	6	3	9

- Date: September 6
- Location: Soldier Field, Chicago
- Game start: 2:00 p.m.
- Game weather: 63 °F (17 °C); wind 8 mph (13 km/h)

Scoring summary
Q1		GB	Ivery 2-yard run (Wingo pass from Stachowicz)	GB 8–0
Q2		GB	Ellis 5-yard run (kick blocked)	GB 13–0
Q3		CHI	Payton 11-yard run (kick failed)	GB 13–6
Q4		GB	Stenerud 33-yard field goal	GB 16–6
Q4	3:57	CHI	Thomas 25-yard field goal	GB 16–9

==== Week 2: vs. Atlanta Falcons ====
Quarter	1	2	3	4	Total
Falcons	0	0	0	31	31
Packers	7	7	3	0	17

at Lambeau Field, Green Bay, Wisconsin

- Date: Sunday, September 13
- Game time: 1:00 p.m.
- Game weather: 73% humidity; 65 °F (18 °C), wind 6 mph (9.7 km/h)
- Referee: Dick Jorgensen
- TV: CBS
- Pro-Football-Reference.com

==== Week 7: vs. San Francisco 49ers ====
Week 7: San Francisco 49ers at Green Bay Packers

Quarter	1	2	3	4	Total
49ers	0	3	7	3	13
Packers	0	3	0	0	3

at Milwaukee County Stadium, Milwaukee, Wisconsin

- Date: October 18, 1981
- Game time: 1:00 p.m. CST
- Game weather: Overcast, 64 °F (18 °C)
- Referee: Ben Dreith
- TV announcers (CBS): Tim Ryan and Johnny Morris

Game information

First quarter

Second quarter

Third quarter

Fourth quarter

Top passers

- SF – Joe Montana – 23/32, 220 yards
- GB – Lynn Dickey – 11/18, 156 yards

Top rushers

- SF – Johnny Davis – 16 rushes, 65 yards, 1 TD
- GB – Harlan Huckleby – 10 rushes, 20 yards

Top receivers

- SF – Dwight Clark – 6 receptions, 55 yards
- GB – Paul Coffman – 3 receptions, 67 yards

==== Week 9: vs. Seattle Seahawks ====
Week 9: Seattle Seahawks at Green Bay Packers – Game summary

Quarter	1	2	3	4	Total
Seahawks	7	14	3	0	24
Packers	7	14	7	6	34

at Lambeau Field, Green Bay, Wisconsin

- Date: November 1
- Game time: 1:02pm local
- Game weather: clear, 56 °F (13 °C), 75% humidity, wind NE 5 miles per hour (8.0 km/h)
- Game attendance: 49,467
- Referee: Chuck Heberling
- TV announcers (NBC): Sam Nover and Dave Rowe
- Gamebook

Game information

First quarter

- SEA – John Harris 42-yard interception return (Efren Herrera kick), 10:47 (SEA 7–0)
- GB – Paul Coffman 7-yard pass from David Whitehurst (Jan Stenerud kick), 5:57 (Tied 7–7)

Second quarter

- SEA – Dan Doornink 12-yard pass from Jim Zorn (Efren Herrera kick), 11:03 (SEA 14–7)
- GB – David Whitehurst 1-yard run (Jan Stenerud kick), 5:19 (Tied 14–14)
- GB – James Lofton 8-yard pass from David Whitehurst (Jan Stenerud kick), 4:18 (GB 21–14)
- SEA – Dan Doornink 14-yard pass from Jim Zorn (Efren Herrera kick), 0:24 (Tied 21–21)

Third quarter

- SEA – Efren Herrera 54-yard field goal, 5:54 (SEA 24–21)
- GB – James Lofton 38-yard pass from David Whitehurst (Jan Stenerud kick), 1:02 (GB 28–24)

Fourth quarter

- GB – Jan Stenerud 19-yard field goal, 1:58 (GB 31–24)
- GB – Jan Stenerud 36-yard field goal, 0:45 (GB 34–24)

Top passers

- SEA – Jim Zorn: 12/23, 108 yds, 2 TD
- GB – David Whitehurst: 19/31, 205 yds, 3 TD, 2 INT

Top rushers

- SEA – Theotis Brown: 17 car, 89 yds
- GB – Gerry Ellis: 23 car, 127 yds

Top receivers

- SEA – Steve Largent: 3 rec, 45 yds
- GB – James Lofton: 4 rec, 63 yds, 2 TD

Team – pass – rush – total – to

- SEA – 102 – 119 – 221 – 3
- GB – 195 – 182 – 337 – 3

==== Week 11 ====
Team	1	2	3	4	Total
Bears	10	0	0	7	17
• Packers	7	14	0	0	21

- Date: November 15
- Location: Lambeau Field, Green Bay, Wisconsin
- Game start: 1:00 p.m.
- Game weather: 44 °F (7 °C); wind 7 mph (11 km/h)

Scoring summary
Q1	CHI	Roveto 36-yard field goal	CHI 3–0
Q1	GB	Huckleby 1-yard pass from Whitehurst (Stenerud kick)	GB 7–3
Q1	CHI	Suhey 1-yard run (Roveto kick)	CHI 10–7
Q2	GB	Huckleby 39-yard pass from Whitehurst (Stenerud kick)	GB 14–10
Q2	GB	Middleton 2-yard pass from Whitehurst (Stenerud kick)	GB 21—10
Q4	CHI	Payton 2-yard run (Roveto kick)	GB 21–17

=== Standings ===
NFC Central
	W	L	T	PCT	DIV	CONF	PF	PA	STK
Tampa Bay Buccaneers^{(3)}	9	7	0	.563	6–2	9–3	315	268	W1
Detroit Lions	8	8	0	.500	4–4	6–6	397	322	L1
Green Bay Packers	8	8	0	.500	4–4	7–7	324	361	L1
Minnesota Vikings	7	9	0	.438	4–4	6–6	325	369	L5
Chicago Bears	6	10	0	.375	2–6	2–10	253	324	W3
