= 1980 Green Bay Packers season =

NFL team season

- Head coach: Bart Starr
- Home stadium: Lambeau Field; Milwaukee County Stadium

Results
- Record: 5–10–1
- Division place: 5th NFC Central
- Playoffs: Did not qualify

The 1980 Green Bay Packers season was their 62nd season overall and their 60th in the National Football League (NFL). The team posted a 5–10–1 record under coach Bart Starr, earning them a fifth-place finish in the NFC Central division.

Before the 1980 season even began, first-round draft pick Bruce Clark bolted directly for the Canadian Football League, never playing a down for the Packers. He forced a trade to the New Orleans Saints upon returning to the United States. Green Bay regrouped and started strong by outlasting the Chicago Bears in an overtime thriller in the season opener. But with 27 players on injured reserved during the course of the year, the team was unable to replenish its roster and Green Bay suffered their 7th losing season in 8 years.

Exactly three months after the opener at Lambeau Field, The Packers would rematch with the Bears. However, Chicago exacted revenge by embarrassing the Packers 61–7 at Soldier Field, causing the Packers to be eliminated from the playoffs for the 8th straight season.

== Offseason ==
=== NFL draft ===
1980 Green Bay Packers draft
Round	Pick	Player	Position	College	Notes
1	4	Bruce Clark *	Defensive end	Penn State	
1	26	George Cumby	Linebacker	Oklahoma	from San Diego
2	34	Mark Lee	Cornerback	Washington	
3	61	Syd Kitson	Guard	Wake Forest	
4	87	Fred Nixon	Wide receiver	Oklahoma	
6	143	Karl Swanke	Offensive tackle	Boston College	
7	169	Buddy Aydelette	Offensive tackle	Alabama	
8	199	Tim Smith	Cornerback	Oregon State	
9	226	Kelly Saalfeld	Center	Nebraska	
10	253	Jafus White	Defensive back	Texas A&I	
11	283	Ricky Skiles	Linebacker	Louisville	
12	310	James Stewart	Cornerback	Memphis State	
Made roster * Made at least one Pro Bowl during career

=== Undrafted free agents ===
1980 undrafted free agents of note
Player	Position	College
Bruce Barkwill	Running back	Lawrence
Tom Bell	Guard	BYU
Jerry Bey	Running back	Western Illinois
Pat Bowe	Tight end	Stanford
Kurt Christensen	Kicker	Concordia
Paul Columbia	Tight End	Villanova
Robert de la Puente	Punter	Cal State Northridge
Lonnie Greene	Defensive line	Mississippi State
Mike Kennedy	Quarterback	Oregon
Mark Murphy	Safety	West Liberty State
Joe Odom	Guard/Center	Wichita State
Carlton Pride	Running back	Memphis State
Dave Schwab	Defensive line	South Dakota
Steve Turk	Quarterback	Eastern Illinois
Joe Verria	Defensive tackle	Bridgewater State
Tom Virgl	Linebacker	Kearney State
Mark Williquette	Defensive back	Wisconsin–La Crosse
Paul Winters	Running back	Akron

== Personnel ==
=== Staff ===
1980 Green Bay Packers staff
Front office: President – Dominic Olejniczak; Vice President – Robert J. Parins; Corporate General Manager – Bob Harlan; Director of player personnel – Dick Corrick; Head coaches: Head coach – Bart Starr; Offensive coaches: Quarterbacks/Offensive Backs – Zeke Bratkowski; Receivers – Lew Carpenter; Offensive Line – Ernie McMillan; Assistant Offensive Line – Tom Lovat; Special Assistant – Dick Rehbein	Defensive coaches: Defensive Coordinator – John Meyer; Defensive Line – Jim Champion; Defensive Line – Fred von Appen; Linebackers – John Marshall; Defensive Backs – Ross Fichtner; Special teams coaches: Special Teams – John Marshall

=== Roster ===
1980 Green Bay Packers roster
Quarterbacks (QB): 12 Lynn Dickey; 18 Mark Miller; 17 David Whitehurst; Running backs (RB): 44 Vickey Ray Anderson; 31 Gerry Ellis; 25 Harlan Huckleby; 40 Eddie Lee Ivery; 34 Terdell Middleton; 33 Barty Smith; Wide receivers (WR): 85 Bobby Kimball; 80 James Lofton; 84 Fred Nixon; 89 Aundra Thompson; Tight ends (TE): 82 Paul Coffman; 87 Bill Larson	Offensive linemen (OL): 74 Ken Brown C; 57 Derrel Gofourth G; 69 Leotis Harris G; 64 Syd Kitson G; 68 Greg Koch T; 54 Larry McCarren C; 76 Tim Stokes T; 67 Karl Swanke T; Defensive linemen (DL): 77 Mike Butler DE; 99 Charles Johnson NT; 90 Ezra Johnson DE; 63 Terry Jones NT; 72 Kit Lathrop DE; 66 Mike Lewis NT; 78 Casey Merrill DE	Linebackers (LB): 60 Kurt Allerman ILB; 58 Bruce Beekley ILB; 65 Brian Cabral ILB; 53 Mike Douglass OLB; 51 Jim Gueno OLB; 70 Paul Rudzinski ILB; Defensive backs (DB): 24 Johnnie Gray FS; 21 Mike Jolly FS; 22 Mark Lee CB; 46 Steve Luke SS; 29 Mike McCoy CB; 37 Mark Murphy SS; 20 Wylie Turner CB; Special teams (ST): 11 David Beverly P; 10 Jan Stenerud K	Reserve: 59 John Anderson LB (IR); 32 Steve Atkins RB (IR); 62 Buddy Aydelette T (IR); 88 Ron Cassidy WR (IR); 52 George Cumby LB (IR); 38 Estus Hood CB (IR); 55 Mike Hunt LB (IR); 79 Mark Koncar T (IR); 71 Melvin Jackson G (IR); 56 Ed O'Neil LB (IR); -- Tim Smith S (IR); 96 Troy Thomas DE (IR); 83 John Thompson TE (IR); 26 Eric Torkelson RB (IR); 50 Rich Wingo LB (IR); Rookies in italics

== Regular season ==
=== Schedule ===
Week	Date	Opponent	Result	Record	Venue	Recap
1	September 7	Chicago Bears	W 12–6 (OT)	1–0	Lambeau Field	Recap
2	September 14	Detroit Lions	L 7–29	1–1	Milwaukee County Stadium	Recap
3	September 21	at Los Angeles Rams	L 21–51	1–2	Anaheim Stadium	Recap
4	September 28	Dallas Cowboys	L 7–28	1–3	Milwaukee County Stadium	Recap
5	October 5	Cincinnati Bengals	W 14–9	2–3	Lambeau Field	Recap
6	October 12	at Tampa Bay Buccaneers	T 14–14 (OT)	2–3–1	Tampa Stadium	Recap
7	October 19	at Cleveland Browns	L 21–26	2–4–1	Cleveland Stadium	Recap
8	October 26	Minnesota Vikings	W 16–3	3–4–1	Lambeau Field	Recap
9	November 2	at Pittsburgh Steelers	L 20–22	3–5–1	Three Rivers Stadium	Recap
10	November 9	San Francisco 49ers	W 23–16	4–5–1	Milwaukee County Stadium	Recap
11	November 16	at New York Giants	L 21–27	4–6–1	Giants Stadium	Recap
12	November 23	at Minnesota Vikings	W 25–13	5–6–1	Metropolitan Stadium	Recap
13	November 30	Tampa Bay Buccaneers	L 17–20	5–7–1	Milwaukee County Stadium	Recap
14	December 7	at Chicago Bears	L 7–61	5–8–1	Soldier Field	Recap
15	December 14	Houston Oilers	L 3–22	5–9–1	Lambeau Field	Recap
16	December 21	at Detroit Lions	L 3–24	5–10–1	Pontiac Silverdome	Recap

=== Standings ===
NFC Central
	W	L	T	PCT	DIV	CONF	PF	PA	STK
^{(3)} Minnesota Vikings	9	7	0	.563	5–3	8–4	317	308	L1
Detroit Lions	9	7	0	.563	5–3	9–5	334	272	W2
Chicago Bears	7	9	0	.438	5–3	7–5	304	264	W1
Tampa Bay Buccaneers	5	10	1	.344	1–6–1	4–7–1	271	341	L3
Green Bay Packers	5	10	1	.344	3–4–1	4–7–1	231	371	L4

=== Game summaries ===
==== Week 1: vs. Chicago Bears ====
Week 1: Chicago Bears at Green Bay Packers

Quarter	1	2	3	4	OT	Total
Bears	3	0	3	0	0	6
Packers	0	6	0	0	6	12

at Lambeau Field, Green Bay, Wisconsin

- Date: September 7, 1980
- Game time: 1:00 p.m. CST
- Game weather: Overcast, 65 °F (18 °C)
- Referee: Jim Tunney
- TV announcers (CBS): Lindsey Nelson and Sonny Jurgensen

Game information

First quarter

Second quarter

Third quarter

Fourth quarter

Top passers

- CHI – Mike Phipps – 17/30, 174 yards, 3 INT
- GB – Lynn Dickey – 10/22, 138 yards, 1 INT

Top rushers

- CHI – Walter Payton – 31 rushes, 65 yards
- GB – Eddie Lee Ivery – 15 rushes, 73 yards

Top receivers

- CHI – James Scott – 5 receptions, 59 yards
- GB – James Lofton – 5 receptions, 77 yards

==== Week 2: vs. Detroit Lions ====
Week 2: Detroit Lions at Green Bay Packers

Quarter	1	2	3	4	Total
Lions	3	13	6	7	29
Packers	0	7	0	0	7

at Milwaukee County Stadium, Milwaukee, Wisconsin

- Date: September 14, 1980
- Game time: 1:00 p.m. CST
- Game weather: Overcast, 64 °F (18 °C)
- Referee: Bob Frederic
- TV announcers (CBS): Frank Glieber and Roger Staubach

Game information

First quarter

Second quarter

Third quarter

Fourth quarter

Top passers

- DET – Gary Danielson – 11/17, 246 yards, 1 TD
- GB – Lynn Dickey – 16/30, 174 yards, 1 INT

Top rushers

- DET – Billy Sims – 20 rushes, 134 yards, 1 TD
- GB – Eddie Lee Ivery – 10 rushes, 31 yards, 1 TD

Top receivers

- DET – Dexter Bussey – 5 receptions, 74 yards
- GB – James Lofton – 4 receptions, 73 yards

==== Week 3 vs. Los Angeles Rams ====
- date=September 21, 1980
- TV: CBS
- TV Announcers: Gary Bender and John Madden

==== Week 4: vs. Dallas Cowboys ====
Week 4: Dallas Cowboys at Green Bay Packers

Quarter	1	2	3	4	Total
Cowboys	7	7	7	7	28
Packers	0	7	0	0	7

at Milwaukee County Stadium, Milwaukee, Wisconsin

- Date: September 28, 1980
- Game time: 1:00 p.m. CST
- Game weather: Overcast, 55 °F (13 °C)
- Referee: Fred Silva
- TV announcers (CBS): Lindsey Nelson and Sonny Jurgensen

Game information

First quarter

Second quarter

Third quarter

Fourth quarter

Top passers

- DAL – Danny White – 16/20, 217 yards, 2 TD
- GB – Lynn Dickey – 11/26, 141 yards, 1 INT

Top rushers

- DAL – Tony Dorsett – 22 rushes, 77 yards, 1 TD
- GB – Eddie Lee Ivery – 9 rushes, 58 yards

Top receivers

- DAL – Tony Hill – 5 receptions, 71 yards
- GB – Aundra Thompson – 5 receptions, 77 yards

== Awards and records ==
=== Hall of Famers ===
In 1980 Packer great Herb Adderley was inducted into the Pro Football Hall of Fame
