= 1978 Green Bay Packers season =

NFL team season

- Head coach: Bart Starr
- Home stadium: Lambeau Field; Milwaukee County Stadium

Results
- Record: 8–7–1
- Division place: 2nd NFC Central
- Playoffs: Did not qualify

The 1978 Green Bay Packers season was their 60th season overall and their 58th season in the National Football League (NFL). The team posted an 8–7–1 record under coach Bart Starr, earning them a second-place finish in the NFC Central division. This marked the first season the Packers were above .500 since 1972. The Packers got off to a 6–1 start. However, most of the wins came against weaker teams, and once the schedule toughened up the Packers struggled winning only one and tying one of their next six games. After a big win in Tampa Bay over the Buccaneers, the 8–5–1 Packers still had a shot at a NFC Central Title. However, the team would lose both of their final games, closing out with a 31–14 loss to the Los Angeles Rams and at 8–7–1 finished in a first-place tie with Minnesota. Since the Packers' record against the Vikings was 0–1–1 due to a 10–10 tie and a 21–7 loss, Green Bay missed the playoffs as the Eagles also leap-frogged the Packers for the final Wild Card spot, which the Packers would've still clinched at minimum regardless of the Vikings' result for the NFC Central.

== Off-season ==
=== NFL draft ===
1978 Green Bay Packers draft
Round	Pick	Player	Position	College	Notes
1	6	James Lofton * ^{†}	Wide receiver	Stanford	
1	26	John Anderson	Linebacker	Michigan	
2	34	Mike Hunt	Linebacker	Minnesota	
3	62	Estus Hood	Cornerback	Illinois State	
5	116	Mike Douglass	Linebacker	San Diego State	
5	128	Willie Wilder	Running back	Florida	
6	144	Leotis Harris	Guard	Arkansas	
7	172	George Plasketes	Linebacker	Ole Miss	
8	200	Dennis Sproul	Quarterback	Arizona State	
9	228	Keith Myers	Quarterback	Utah State	
10	256	Larry Key	Running back	Florida State	
10	259	Mark Totten	Center	Florida	
11	284	Terry Jones	Defensive tackle	Alabama	
12	312	Eason Ramson	Tight end	Washington State	
Made roster † Pro Football Hall of Fame * Made at least one Pro Bowl during career

=== Undrafted free agents ===
1978 undrafted free agents of note
Player	Position	College
Paul Coffman	Tight end	Kansas State
Pat Healy	Running back	Colgate
Walt Landers	Running back	Clark Atlanta
Rick Peot	Punter	Wisconsin–Stevens Point
Paul Rudzinski	Linebacker	Michigan State
Howard Sampson	Defensive back	Arkansas

== Personnel ==
=== Roster ===
1978 Green Bay Packers roster
Quarterbacks (QB): 19 Bobby Douglass; 17 David Whitehurst; Running backs (RB): 31 Jim Culbreath; 40 Reggie Harrison; 34 Terdell Middleton; 48 Nate Simpson; 33 Barty Smith; 26 Eric Torkelson; Wide receivers (WR): 85 Elmo Boyd; 80 James Lofton; 43 Aundra Thompson; 20 Walter Tullis; Tight ends (TE): 82 Paul Coffman; 81 Rich McGeorge	Offensive linemen (OL): 57 Derrel Gofourth G; 69 Leotis Harris G; 71 Melvin Jackson G; 68 Greg Koch T; 54 Larry McCarren C; 56 Rick Nuzum C; 58 Randy Pass C; 73 Gerald Skinner T; 78 Tim Stokes T; Defensive linemen (DL): 70 Bob Barber DE; 75 Carl Barzilauskas DT; 77 Mike Butler DE; 78 Ezra Johnson DE; 63 Terry Jones DT; 74 Dave Roller DT	Linebackers (LB): 50 Jim Carter MLB; 53 Frank Chesley OLB; 65 Mike Douglass OLB; 51 Jim Gueno OLB; 55 Mike Hunt MLB; 66 Paul Rudzinski OLB; 52 Gary Weaver OLB; Defensive backs (DB): 28 Willie Buchanon CB; 24 Johnnie Gray FS; 38 Estus Hood CB; 46 Steve Luke SS; 29 Mike McCoy CB; 36 Howard Sampson SS; 21 Steve Wagner FS; Special teams (ST): 11 David Beverly; 13 Chester Marcol	Reserve: 60 John Anderson LB (IR); 10 Lynn Dickey QB (IR); 79 Mark Koncar T (IR); 42 Walt Landers RB (IR); 84 Steve Odom WR (IR); 64 Rick Scribner G (IR); 16 Dennis Sproul QB (IR); 44 Willie Wilder RB (IR); Rookies in italics

== Regular season ==
=== Schedule ===
Week	Date	Opponent	Result	Record	Venue	Attendance
1	September 3	at **Detroit Lions**	**W** 13–7	1–0	Pontiac Silverdome	51,187
2	September 10	New Orleans Saints	**W** 28–17	2–0	Milwaukee County Stadium	54,336
3	September 17	Oakland Raiders	**L** 3–28	2–1	Lambeau Field	55,903
4	September 24	at San Diego Chargers	**W** 24–3	3–1	San Diego Stadium	42,755
5	October 1	**Detroit Lions**	**W** 35–14	4–1	Milwaukee County Stadium	54,601
6	October 8	**Chicago Bears**	**W** 24–14	5–1	Lambeau Field	56,267
7	October 15	Seattle Seahawks	**W** 45–28	6–1	Milwaukee County Stadium	52,712
8	October 22	at **Minnesota Vikings**	**L** 7–21	6–2	Metropolitan Stadium	47,411
9	October 29	**Tampa Bay Buccaneers**	**W** 9–7	7–2	Lambeau Field	55,108
10	November 5	at Philadelphia Eagles	**L** 3–10	7–3	Veterans Stadium	64,214
11	November 12	Dallas Cowboys	**L** 14–42	7–4	Milwaukee County Stadium	55,256
12	November 19	at Denver Broncos	**L** 3–16	7–5	Mile High Stadium	74,965
13	November 26	**Minnesota Vikings**	**T** 10–10 (OT)	7–5–1	Lambeau Field	51,737
14	December 3	at **Tampa Bay Buccaneers**	**W** 17–7	8–5–1	Tampa Stadium	67,754
15	December 10	at **Chicago Bears**	**L** 0–14	8–6–1	Soldier Field	34,306
16	December 17	at Los Angeles Rams	**L** 14–31	8–7–1	Los Angeles Memorial Coliseum	42,500

Note: Intra-division opponents are in bold text

=== Week 2 vs. New Orleans Saints ===
- Network: CBS
- Announcers: Bill Mazer, Hank Stram, Nick Buoniconti

David Whitehurst fired four touchdown passes, three to rookie James Lofton on plays covering 42, 47 and 18 yards, and Terdell Middleton rushed for 114 yards to lead The Green Bay Packers to victory and a 2–0 start for the first time since 1969. Whitehurst a second-year quarterback, completing 10 of 15 passes for the young Packers. His other scoring pass was a nine-yarder to Rich McGeorge early in the fourth quarter.

=== Week 6 vs Bears ===
Week Six: Chicago Bears (3–2) at Green Bay Packers (4–1)

Quarter	1	2	3	4	Total
Bears	0	0	0	14	**14**
**Packers**	0	3	14	7	**24**

at Lambeau Field, Green Bay, Wisconsin

- Date: October 8
- Game time: 2:00 p.m.
- Game weather: 40 °F (4 °C)
- Game attendance: 56,267
- Referee: Gordon McCarter
- TV: CBS
- Box Score

Game information

**First quarter**

- No scoring

**Second quarter**

- GB – Chester Marcol 41-yard field goal. Packers 3–0.

**Third quarter**

- GB – Terdell Middleton 2-yard run (Chester Marcol kick). Packers 10–0.
- GB – Steve Luke 63-yard interception return (Chester Marcol kick). Packers 17–0.

**Fourth quarter**

- CHI – James Scott 15-yard pass from Bob Avellini (Bob Thomas kick). Packers 17–7.
- GB – James Lofton 58-yard pass from David Whitehurst (Chester Marcol kick). Packers 24–7.
- CHI – James Scott 17-yard pass from Bob Avellini (Bob Thomas kick). Packers 24–14.

Top passers

- CHI – Bob Avellini – 23/37, 224 yards, 2 TD, 3 INT
- GB – David Whitehurst – 6/12, 88 yards, TD

Top rushers

- CHI – Walter Payton – 19 rushes, 82 yards
- GB – Terdell Middleton – 16 rushes, 64 yards, TD

Top receivers

- CHI – James Scott – 9 receptions, 113 yards, 2 TD
- GB – James Lofton – 2 receptions, 65 yards, TD

=== Week 8 at Vikings ===
Week Eight: Green Bay Packers (6–1) at Minnesota Vikings (3–4)

Quarter	1	2	3	4	Total
Packers	0	7	0	0	**7**
**Vikings**	0	14	0	7	**21**

at Metropolitan Stadium, Bloomington, Minnesota

- Date: October 22
- Game time: 2:00 p.m. CDT
- Game weather: 51 °F (11 °C)
- Game attendance: 47,411
- TV announcers (CBS): Lindsey Nelson and Paul Hornung
- Pro-Football-Reference.com

Game information

**First quarter**

- No scoring

**Second quarter**

- MIN – Chuck Foreman 16-yard pass from Fran Tarkenton (Rick Danmeier kick). Vikings 7–0.
- GB – Terdell Middleton 3-yard run (Chester Marcol kick). Tied 7–7.
- MIN – Ahmad Rashad 4-yard pass from Fran Tarkenton (Rick Danmeier kick). Vikings 14–7.

**Third quarter**

- No scoring

**Fourth quarter**

- MIN – Ahmad Rashad 15-yard pass from Fran Tarkenton (Rick Danmeier kick). Vikings 21–7.

**Top passers**

- GB – David Whitehurst – 18/30, 120 yards, INT
- MIN – Fran Tarkenton – 26/43, 262 yards, 3 TD

**Top rushers**

- GB – Terdell Middleton – 15 rushes, 81 yards, TD
- MIN – Chuck Foreman – 24 rushes, 46 yards

**Top receivers**

- GB – Barty Smith – 6 receptions, 54 yards
- MIN – Rickey Young – 7 receptions, 73 yards

== Standings ==
NFC Central
	W	L	T	PCT	DIV	CONF	PF	PA	STK
Minnesota Vikings^{(3)}	8	7	1	.531	5–2–1	7–4–1	294	306	L2
Green Bay Packers	8	7	1	.531	5–2–1	6–5–1	249	269	L2
Detroit Lions	7	9	0	.438	4–4	5–7	290	300	W2
Chicago Bears	7	9	0	.438	3–5	7–5	253	274	W2
Tampa Bay Buccaneers	5	11	0	.313	2–6	3–11	241	259	L4

== Awards and records ==
- Terrell Middleton, NFC leader in touchdowns
