= 1978 San Diego Chargers season =

1978 NFL team season

- Owner: Eugene V. Klein
- General manager: Johnny Sanders
- Head coach: Tommy Prothro (resigned Sept. 25, 1–3 record); Don Coryell (interim, 8–4 record)
- Home stadium: San Diego Stadium

Results
- Record: 9–7
- Division place: 4th AFC West
- Playoffs: Did not qualify
- All-Pros: 2: WR John Jefferson (2nd team); DT Louie Kelcher (1st team)
- Pro Bowlers: 3: WR John Jefferson; T Russ Washington; DT Louie Kelcher

The 1978 San Diego Chargers season was the team's 19th season, and ninth in the National Football League.

The Chargers improved on their 7–7 record in 1977. This season included the "Holy Roller" game. It was Don Coryell's first season as the team's head coach, replacing Tommy Prothro after four games, and the team's first 16-game schedule.

Said the 2006 edition of Pro Football Prospectus, "The Chargers were one of the worst franchises in the NFL before they hired Don Coryell four games into the 1978 season. The Chargers were 1–3 at the time, but finished 8–4 under Coryell, winning seven of their last eight games for the franchise's first winning record since 1969. Blessed with Hall of Famer Dan Fouts, the creative Coryell always designed potent offenses, but the San Diego Defense didn't catch up until 1979...."

New head coach Coryell lost three out of his first four games before ending the season by winning seven out of the last eight.

Fouts had lost the starting job in Prothro's last game in charge, but grew in confidence as the season progress — 917 of his 2,999 passing yards came in the final three games alone. He had more attempts, completions, yards and touchdowns than in any of his five previous seasons in the NFL, and posted a league-leading 7.9 yards per attempts. Rookie John Jefferson had a strong year, with 56 catches for 1001 yards. He also scored a league-leading 13 receiving touchdowns, tying a rookie record set in 1952 by Billy Howton.

San Diego brought in Lydell Mitchell to strengthen the running game; in each of the three previous seasons, he had rushed for over 1,000 yards with Baltimore. While less effective in a Charger uniform, he did post 820 yards, while adding 500 more on a team-leading 57 catches. Hank Bauer was used as a short-yardage specialist, 6 of his 9 touchdowns were runs of 1 or 2 yards.

The defense slipped slightly, from 6th to 8th in terms of yardage, but remained a solid unit. Fred Dean had 13.5 sacks, and Mike Fuller ran one of his four interceptions back for a touchdown. Second-year kicker Rolf Benirschke made 18 kicks out of 22; his success rate of 81.8% was the second best in the league.

== Offseason ==
=== NFL draft ===
1978 San Diego Chargers draft
Round	Pick	Player	Position	College	Notes
1	14	John Jefferson *	Wide receiver	Arizona State	
2	41	Buddy Hardaway	Tackle	Oklahoma State	
3	71	Rickey Anderson	Running back	South Carolina State	
5	135	John Choma	Guard	Virginia	
7	180	Cliff Featherstone	Defensive back	Colorado State	
8	220	Gavin Hedrick	Punter	Washington State	
9	237	Henry Bradley	Nose tackle	Alcorn State	
9	248	Blake Whitlatch	Linebacker	Louisiana State	
10	264	Charles Price	Tight end	Cincinnati	
12	321	Kevin Bell	Wide receiver	Lamar	
Made roster * Made at least one Pro Bowl during career

=== Early-season resignation of head coach Tommy Prothro and hiring of Don Coryell ===
The previous season Prothro had told team owner Gene Klein that he would coach for only one more year. After the team's third loss in a row, Prothro stayed at the stadium until almost midnight watching game films, and it was during this time that he decided to resign. In a public statement, he said, "I still believe this is a good football team and it is a playoff contender. However, after disappointing losses to Oakland and Denver and the disaster against Green Bay, I feel a fresh approach and a rude awakening may be what this team needs." Klein asked Prothro to stay on in an open-ended position to work in such areas as drafting and trading.

The Chargers hired former St. Louis Cardinal Coach Don Coryell who had been asked to step down from an active role by St. Louis at the end of the last season. Because he still had two years left on his contract with St. Louis, the Chargers agreed to give St. Louis a third-round draft pick to fully release Coryell from the Cardinals. Coryell had previously coached at San Diego State University from 1961 to 1972 before going to St. Louis. He said, "I'm pleased with the opportunity to coach again in San Diego because it's like a dream come true."

== Roster ==
1978 San Diego Chargers roster
Quarterbacks (QB): 14 Dan Fouts; 12 James Harris; 10 Cliff Olander; Running backs (RB): 43 Rickey Anderson; 37 Hank Bauer; 41 Bo Matthews; 26 Lydell Mitchell; 40 Clarence Williams; 33 Don Woods; Wide receivers (WR): 87 Larry Burton; 83 John Jefferson; 18 Charlie Joiner; 89 Dwight McDonald; Tight ends (TE): 82 Pat Curran; 84 Bob Klein; 88 Greg McCrary	Offensive linemen (OL): 60 Dan Audick G; 77 Milton Hardaway T; 62 Don Macek C; 53 Ralph Perretta C; 58 Mark Slater C; 66 Billy Shields T; 70 Russ Washington T; 67 Ed White G; 63 Doug Wilkerson G; Defensive linemen (DL): 71 Fred Dean DE; 73 Charles DeJurnett DT; 74 Louie Kelcher DT; 79 Gary Johnson DT; 68 Leroy Jones DE; 99 Wilbur Young DE	Linebackers (LB): 50 Don Goode OLB; 55 Bob Horn MLB; 54 Jim Laslavic MLB; 51 Woodrow Lowe OLB; 52 Ray Preston OLB; Defensive backs (DB): 48 Jerome Dove CB; 27 Glen Edwards FS; 42 Mike Fuller SS; 31 Keith King SS; 44 Pete Shaw FS; 45 Hal Stringert CB; 29 Mike Williams CB; Special teams (ST): 6 Rolf Benirschke K; 80 Jeff West P	Reserve: -- John Choma G (IR); 69 John Lee DE (IR); 57 Rick Middleton LB (IR); 85 Artie Owens (IR); 20 Johnny Rodgers WR (IR); 56 Bob Rush C (IR); Rookies in italics

== Preseason ==
Week	Date	Opponent	Result	Record	Venue	Attendance
1	August 4	at Seattle Seahawks	L 9–17	0–1	Kingdome	58,853
2	August 12	at Los Angeles Rams	W 17–0	1–1	Los Angeles Memorial Coliseum	45,497
3	August 19	New York Jets	L 10–23	1–2	San Diego Stadium	42,100
4	August 26	at New York Giants	W 17–6	2–2	Giants Stadium	37,652

== Regular season ==
=== Schedule ===
Week	Date	Opponent	Result	Record	Venue	Attendance	Recap
1	September 3	at **Seattle Seahawks**	**W** 24–20	1–0	Kingdome	55,778	Recap
2	September 10	**Oakland Raiders**	**L** 20–21	1–1	San Diego Stadium	51,653	Recap
3	September 17	at **Denver Broncos**	**L** 14–27	1–2	Mile High Stadium	74,983	Recap
4	September 24	Green Bay Packers	**L** 3–24	1–3	San Diego Stadium	42,755	Recap
5	October 1	at New England Patriots	**L** 23–28	1–4	Schaefer Stadium	60,781	Recap
6	October 8	**Denver Broncos**	**W** 23–0	2–4	San Diego Stadium	50,077	Recap
7	October 15	Miami Dolphins	**L** 21–28	2–5	San Diego Stadium	50,637	Recap
8	October 22	at Detroit Lions	**L** 14–31	2–6	Pontiac Silverdome	54,031	Recap
9	October 29	at **Oakland Raiders**	**W** 27–23	3–6	Oakland–Alameda County Coliseum	52,612	Recap
10	November 5	Cincinnati Bengals	**W** 22–13	4–6	San Diego Stadium	43,639	Recap
11	November 12	**Kansas City Chiefs**	**W** 29–23 (OT)	5–6	San Diego Stadium	41,395	Recap
12	November 19	at Minnesota Vikings	**W** 13–7	6–6	Metropolitan Stadium	38,859	Recap
13	November 26	at **Kansas City Chiefs**	**L** 0–23	6–7	Arrowhead Stadium	26,248	Recap
14	December 4	Chicago Bears	**W** 40–7	7–7	San Diego Stadium	48,492	Recap
15	December 10	**Seattle Seahawks**	**W** 37–10	8–7	San Diego Stadium	49,975	Recap
16	December 17	at Houston Oilers	**W** 45–24	9–7	Houston Astrodome	49,554	Recap
Note: Intra-division opponents are in **bold** text.

=== Game summaries ===
==== Week 1: at Seattle Seahawks ====
Week One: San Diego Chargers at Seattle Seahawks – Game summary

Quarter	1	2	3	4	Total
**Chargers**	7	3	7	7	**24**
Seahawks	6	7	0	7	**20**

at Kingdome, Seattle, Washington

- Date: September 3
- Game time: 1:00 p.m. PDT
- Game weather: Dome
- Game attendance: 55,778
- Referee: Dick Jorgensen
- TV announcers (NBC): Stu Nahan and Paul Maguire
- Box score

Game information

**First quarter**

- SEA – Sherman Smith 64-yard pass from Jim Zorn (kick failed), 12:02. Seahawks 6–0. **Drive: 6 plays, 80 yards, 2:58.**
- SDG – John Jefferson 29-yard pass from Dan Fouts (Rolf Benirschke kick), 2:24. Chargers 7–6. **Drive: 7 plays, 83 yards, 3:03.**

**Second quarter**

- SDG – Rolf Benirschke 18-yard field goal, 3:21. Chargers 10–6. **Drive: 11 plays, 69 yards, 4:52.**
- SEA – Jim Zorn 23-yard run (Efren Herrera kick), 0:16. Seahawks 13–10. **Drive: 8 plays, 71 yards, 3:05.**

**Third quarter**

- SDG – John Jefferson 6-yard pass from Dan Fouts (Rolf Benirschke kick), 11:23. Chargers 17–13. **Drive: 8 plays, 59 yards, 3:37.**

**Fourth quarter**

- SDG – Gary Johnson 52-yard interception return (Rolf Benirschke kick), 12:15. Chargers 24–13.
- SEA – Steve Largent 33-yard pass from Jim Zorn (Efren Herrera kick), 0:06. Chargers 24–20. **Drive: 12 plays, 96 yards, 3:25.**

**Top passers**

- SDG – Dan Fouts – 14/22, 186 yards, 2 TD, INT
- SEA – Jim Zorn – 21/32, 329 yards, 2 TD, INT

**Top rushers**

- SDG – Bo Matthews – 10 rushes, 49 yards
- SEA – David Sims – 18 rushes, 61 yards

**Top receivers**

- SDG – Don Woods – 7 receptions, 77 yards
- SEA – Steve Largent – 6 receptions, 127 yards, TD

Rookie wide receiver John Jefferson had a successful debut as the Chargers won their opener. Two of Jefferson's three receptions went for touchdowns, and the Chargers led 17–13 after three quarters. A fumbled snap by Seattle quarterback Jim Zorn then gave San Diego a chance to increase their lead, but Fouts was picked off in the end zone when he looked for Jefferson once more. Seattle soon reached a 1st and 10 at the Charger 45, whereupon defensive tackle Gary "Big Hands" Johnson made his first career interception, picking off an ill-advised cross-field pass from Zorn and running it back 52 yards for the game's crucial touchdown. By the time Seattle scored again, only 6 seconds remained.

==== Week 2: vs. Oakland Raiders ====
Week Two: Oakland Raiders at San Diego Chargers – Game summary

Quarter	1	2	3	4	Total
**Raiders**	0	7	0	14	**21**
Chargers	0	13	0	7	**20**

at San Diego Stadium, San Diego, California

- Date: September 10
- Game time: 1:00 p.m. PDT
- Game weather: 71 °F (21.7 °C) relative humidity 70%, wind 11 miles per hour (18 km/h; 9.6 kn)
- Game attendance: 51,653
- Referee: Jerry Markbreit
- TV announcers (NBC): Jim Simpson and Paul Warfield
- Box score

Game information

**First quarter** No scoring plays. **Second quarter**

- SDG – Pat Curran 14-yard pass from Dan Fouts (Rolf Benirschke kick), 14:55. Chargers 7–0. **Drive: 5 plays, 35 yards, 2:15.**
- OAK – Dave Casper 6-yard pass from Ken Stabler (Errol Mann kick), 12:08. Tied 7–7. **Drive: 5 plays, 76 yards, 2:47.**
- SDG – Hank Bauer 1-yard run (kick blocked), 5:36. Chargers 14–7. **Drive: 8 plays, 75 yards, 3:28.**

**Third quarter** No scoring plays. **Fourth quarter**

- SDG – Hank Bauer 2-yard run (Rolf Benirschke kick), 12:42. Chargers 20–7. **Drive: 11 plays, 64 yards, 5:46.**
- OAK – Morris Bradshaw 44-yard pass from Ken Stabler (Errol Mann kick), 8:26. Chargers 20–14. **Drive: 3 plays, 55 yards, 0:18.**
- OAK – Dave Casper offensive fumble recovery in end zone (Errol Mann kick), 0:00. Raiders 21–20. **Drive: 8 plays, 81 yards, 1:07.**

**Top passers**

- OAK – Ken Stabler – 15/35, 307 yards, 2 TD, 3 INT
- SDG – Dan Fouts – 5/13, 175 yards, TD

**Top rushers**

- OAK – Mark van Eeghen – 12 rushes, 72 yards
- SDG – Bo Matthews – 20 rushes, 78 yards

**Top receivers**

- OAK – Morris Bradshaw – 4 receptions, 107 yards, TD
- SDG – Don Woods – 4 receptions, 51 yards

San Diego began on the front foot, seeing a short Benirschke field goal blocked before Pat Curran opened the scoring when he grabbed a deflected Fouts pass in the end zone. Oakland soon tied the scores, but a pair of Hank Bauer runs put the Chargers up 20–7 early in the 4th quarter (Benirschke missed the extra point after the first of these). Ken Stabler had been kept in check up to this point, throwing three interceptions, including two snagged by Glen Edwards on consecutive 3rd quarter attempts. However, he threw his second touchdown of the game with 8:26 to play, then led his team to a 2nd and 10 at the San Diego 14 with 10 seconds to play.

From there, Oakland won the game with the controversial "Holy Roller" touchdown.

==== Week 3: at Denver Broncos ====
Week Three: San Diego Chargers at Denver Broncos – Game summary

Quarter	1	2	3	4	Total
Chargers	0	14	0	0	**14**
**Broncos**	7	0	6	14	**27**

at Mile High Stadium, Denver, Colorado

- Date: September 17
- Game time: 2:00 p.m. MDT
- Game weather: 67 °F (19.4 °C) relative humidity 32%, wind 14 miles per hour (23 km/h; 12 kn)
- Game attendance: 74,983
- Referee: Jim Tunney
- TV announcers (NBC): Jay Randolph and Mike Haffner
- Box score

Game information

**First quarter**

- DEN – Ron Egloff 2-yard pass from Norris Weese (Jim Turner kick), 0:40. Broncos 7–0. **Drive: 10 plays, 80 yards, 5:11.**

**Second quarter**

- SDG – Dan Fouts 3-yard run (Rolf Benirschke kick), 5:40. Tied 7–7. **Drive: 10 plays, 68 yards, 4:10.**
- SDG – John Jefferson 20-yard pass from Dan Fouts (Rolf Benirschke kick), 1:55. Chargers 14–7. **Drive: 4 plays, 54 yards, 2:05.**

**Third quarter**

- DEN – Lonnie Perrin 1-yard run (kick failed), 1:18. Chargers 14–13. **Drive: 7 plays, 42 yards, 4:55.**

**Fourth quarter**

- DEN – Rick Upchurch 75-yard punt return (Jim Turner kick), 3:17. Broncos 20–14.
- DEN – Lonnie Perrin 21-yard run (Jim Turner kick), 1:33. Broncos 27–14. **Drive: 4 plays, 32 yards, 0:35.**

**Top passers**

- SDG – Dan Fouts – 19/33, 230 yards, TD, 2 INT
- DEN – Craig Morton – 12/22, 141 yards

**Top rushers**

- SDG – Bo Matthews – 11 rushes, 56 yards
- DEN – Lonnie Perrin – 9 rushes, 56 yards, 2 TD

**Top receivers**

- SDG – Charlie Joiner – 2 receptions, 61 yards
- DEN – Riley Odoms – 5 receptions, 69 yards

A strong 2nd quarter proved insufficient for the Chargers. They trailed 7–0 early in the 2nd, when Dan Fouts hit Charlie Joiner for 42 yards down to the Denver 13. An interception foiled that threat, but Fouts rebounded with consecutive touchdown drives, scoring himself on the first and hitting Jefferson from 20 yards for the second. San Diego led 14–7 at the break, and it was still 14–13 late in the game. However, Rick Upchurch returned a punt 75 yards for the winning score with 3:17 on the clock. Denver then stopped the Chargers on downs and added an insurance touchdown.

==== Week 4: vs. Green Bay Packers ====
Week Four: Green Bay Packers at San Diego Chargers – Game summary

Quarter	1	2	3	4	Total
**Packers**	0	7	10	7	**24**
Chargers	0	0	3	0	**3**

at San Diego Stadium, San Diego, California

- Date: September 24
- Game time: 1:00 p.m. PDT
- Game weather: 85 °F (29.4 °C) relative humidity 35%, wind 9 miles per hour (14 km/h; 7.8 kn)
- Game attendance: 42,755
- Referee: Gene Barth
- TV announcers (CBS): Lindsey Nelson and Paul Hornung
- Box score

Game information

**First quarter** No scoring plays. **Second quarter**

- GB – Terdell Middleton 13-yard run (Chester Marcol kick), 9:52. Packers 7–0. **Drive: 1 play, 13 yards, 0:05.**

**Third quarter**

- GB – Walter Landers 15-yard blocked punt return (Chester Marcol kick), 11:19. Packers 14–0.
- SDG – Rolf Benirschke 43-yard field goal, 8:40. Packers 14–3. **Drive: 8 plays, 37 yards, 2:31.**
- GB – Chester Marcol 37-yard field goal, 2:23. Packers 17–3. **Drive: 5 plays, 15 yards, 3:09.**

**Fourth quarter**

- GB – Willie Buchanon 77-yard interception return (Chester Marcol kick), 2:46. Packers 24–3.

**Top passers**

- GB – David Whitehurst – 7/14, 92 yards, INT
- SDG – James Harris – 11/18, 111 yards, 2 INT

**Top rushers**

- GB – Terdell Middleton – 18 rushes, 66 yards, TD
- SDG – Lydell Mitchell – 14 rushes, 47 yards

**Top receivers**

- GB – James Lofton – 3 receptions, 52 yards
- SDG – Charlie Joiner – 4 receptions, 53 yards

Tommy Prothro resigned after a poor performance in which San Diego had eleven turnovers, one short of the NFL record. The game was scoreless when Lydell Mitchell fumbled on 1st and 10 from the Packer 15. That was the first of a string of seven consecutive Charger drives which ended in turnovers, including five lost fumbles. James Harris, who got the start over Dan Fouts, threw a pair of interceptions as well as losing the ball once when sacked.

Green Bay led only 7–0 at the break, but the miscues continued in the second half. Punter Jeff West, who had earlier dropped a lost a snap for one of the Charger turnovers, saw a punt blocked and returned for a touchdown. Dan Fouts replaced Harris and lost a fumble, before throwing two interceptions, the latter of which was run back for a touchdown. Finally, 3rd string quarterback Cliff Olander came in and added one more interception to the tally.

San Diego conceded only 9 first downs and, thanks to a new club record ten sacks, only 9 net passing yards. Louis Kelcher and Fred Dean each had 2.5 sacks, while Gary Johnson and DeJurnett had 2.0 each.

==== Week 5: at New England Patriots ====
Week Five: San Diego Chargers at New England Patriots – Game summary

Quarter	1	2	3	4	Total
Chargers	0	13	7	3	**23**
**Patriots**	7	0	7	14	**28**

at Schaefer Stadium, Foxborough, Massachusetts

- Date: October 1
- Game time: 1:00 p.m. EDT
- Game weather: 59 °F (15.0 °C) relative humidity 83%, wind 10 miles per hour (16 km/h; 8.7 kn)
- Game attendance: 60,781
- Referee: Chuck Heberling
- TV announcers (NBC): Charlie Jones and Len Dawson
- Box score

Game information

**First quarter**

- NE – Harold Jackson 30-yard pass from Steve Grogan (Nick Lowery kick), 5:39. Patriots 7–0. **Drive: 7 plays, 70 yards, 3:01.**

**Second quarter**

- SDG – Pat Curran 3-yard pass from Dan Fouts (kick failed), 10:27. Patriots 7–6. **Drive: 5 plays, 61 yards, 2:20.**
- SDG – John Jefferson 21-yard pass from Dan Fouts (Rolf Benirschke kick), 0:24. Chargers 13–7. **Drive: 6 plays, 48 yards, 1:30.**

**Third quarter**

- SDG – John Jefferson 40-yard pass from Dan Fouts (Rolf Benirschke kick), 13:21. Chargers 20–7. **Drive: 4 plays, 62 yards, 1:39.**
- NE – Harold Jackson 14-yard pass from Steve Grogan (Nick Lowery kick), 2:46. Chargers 20–14. **Drive: 6 plays, 39 yards, 3:19.**

**Fourth quarter**

- NE – Russ Francis 6-yard pass from Steve Grogan (Nick Lowery kick), 4:19. Patriots 21–20. **Drive: 8 plays, 80 yards, 4:19.**
- SDG – Rolf Benirschke 41-yard field goal, 1:55. Chargers 23–21. **Drive: 7 plays, 39 yards, 2:14.**
- NE – Steve Grogan 4-yard run (Nick Lowery kick), 0:31. Patriots 28–23. **Drive: 7 plays, 37 yards, 1:16.**

**Top passers**

- SDG – Dan Fouts – 14/18, 173 yards, 3 TD, INT
- NE – Steve Grogan – 17/29, 231 yards, 3 TD, INT

**Top rushers**

- SDG – Hank Bauer – 16 rushes, 60 yards
- NE – Sam Cunningham – 7 rushes, 27 yards

**Top receivers**

- SDG – John Jefferson – 3 receptions, 74 yards, 2 TD
- NE – Harold Jackson – 4 receptions, 106 yards, 2 TD

Don Coryell's first game in charge ended in defeat after San Diego didn't hold a second-half lead. The pass-oriented "Air Coryell" offense wasn't in evidence yet — San Diego ran the ball 38 times against 23 pass plays, with Hank Bauer gaining a career-high 60 yards. The touchdowns came through the air, though, Dan Fouts finding Pat Curran from 3 yards out, and Jefferson from 21 and 40, Jefferson's first score being set up by a Don Goode interception.

Those success left San Diego up 20—7 early in the 3rd quarter, but later Fouts was picked off to set up a Patriots touchdown, and Benirschke missing a 38-yard field goal. New England later took the lead with an 80-yard touchdown drive. Though Benirschke made amends with a 41-yard kick to put San Diego up 23–21, New England then went 73 yards for the game-winning points, which came with 31 seconds to play.

Dan Fouts finished 14 of 18 for 173 yards, 3 touchdowns and an interception.

==== Week 6: vs. Denver Broncos ====
Week Six: Denver Broncos at San Diego Chargers – Game summary

Quarter	1	2	3	4	Total
Broncos	0	0	0	0	**0**
**Chargers**	7	7	3	6	**23**

at San Diego Stadium, San Diego, California

- Date: October 8
- Game time: 1:00 p.m. PDT
- Game weather: 70 °F (21.1 °C) relative humidity 80%, wind 7 miles per hour (11 km/h; 6.1 kn)
- Game attendance: 50,077
- Referee: Red Cashion
- TV announcers (NBC): Charlie Jones and Len Dawson
- Box score

Game information

**First quarter**

- SDG – Don Woods 1-yard run (Rolf Benirschke kick), 3:46. Chargers 20–14. **Drive: 15 plays, 85 yards, 8:37.**

**Second quarter**

- SDG – Hank Bauer 14-yard pass from Dan Fouts (Rolf Benirschke kick), 12:07. Chargers 14–7. **Drive: 5 plays, 34 yards, 2:41.**

**Third quarter**

- SDG – Rolf Benirschke 28-yard field goal, 10:02. Chargers 20–7. **Drive: 10 plays, 32 yards, 5:48.**

**Fourth quarter**

- SDG – Rolf Benirschke 20-yard field goal, 12:04. Chargers 20–7. **Drive: 13 plays, 57 yards, 5:58.**
- SDG – Rolf Benirschke 24-yard field goal, 5:34. Chargers 20–7. **Drive: 11 plays, 57 yards, 5:38.**

**Top passers**

- DEN – Norris Weese – 5/11, 54 yards, INT
- SDG – Dan Fouts – 22/34, 187 yards, TD, INT

**Top rushers**

- DEN – Dave Preston – 4 rushes, 31 yards
- SDG – Lydell Mitchell – 19 rushes, 65 yards

**Top receivers**

- DEN – Riley Odoms – 3 receptions, 37 yards
- SDG – Lydell Mitchell – 9 receptions, 51 yards

The first win of the Don Coryell era was one of only two shutouts during his eight-year tenure. Fouts began poorly, with an interception on the game's third play, but bounced back to lead his team 85 yards on their next drive, with Don Woods going in from a yard out for the opening score. A fumble by Denver quarterback Craig Morton set up a touchdown reception by Bauer early in the 2nd quarter, and Benirschke added three field goals as the Chargers coasted home.

Denver had particular trouble passing, with three quarterbacks combining for only 8 completions from 30 attempts. The trio threw one interception each, to Glen Edwards, Louie Kelcher and Mike Fuller.

==== Week 7: vs. Miami Dolphins ====
Week Seven: Miami Dolphins at San Diego Chargers – Game summary

Quarter	1	2	3	4	Total
**Dolphins**	7	14	7	0	**28**
Chargers	0	7	14	0	**21**

at San Diego Stadium, San Diego, California

- Date: October 15
- Game time: 1:00 p.m. PDT
- Game weather: 69 °F (20.6 °C) relative humidity 85%, wind 9 miles per hour (14 km/h; 7.8 kn)
- Game attendance: 50,637
- Referee: Cal Lepore
- TV announcers (NBC): Marv Albert and Len Dawson
- Box score

Game information

**First quarter**

- MIA – Jim Braxton 2-yard run (Garo Yepremian kick), 6:33. Chargers 20–14. **Drive: 3 plays, 18 yards, 1:07.**

**Second quarter**

- MIA – Loaird McCreary 5-yard pass from Don Strock (Garo Yepremian kick), 14:12. Chargers 20–14. **Drive: 4 plays, 20 yards, 0:59.**
- SDG – Lydell Mitchell 22-yard pass from Dan Fouts (Rolf Benirschke kick), 3:46. Chargers 14–7. **Drive: 11 plays, 73 yards, 6:12.**
- MIA – Jim Braxton 1-yard run (Garo Yepremian kick), 0:00. Chargers 20–14. **Drive: 4 plays, 2 yards, 0:19.**

**Third quarter**

- SDG – Lydell Mitchell 1-yard run (Rolf Benirschke kick), 10:18. Chargers 14–7. **Drive: 10 plays, 68 yards, 4:42.**
- MIA – Nat Moore 12-yard pass from Bob Griese (Garo Yepremian kick), 5:59. Chargers 20–14. **Drive: 8 plays, 65 yards, 4:19.**
- SDG – Lydell Mitchell 1-yard run (Rolf Benirschke kick), 3:34. Chargers 14–7. **Drive: 7 plays, 63 yards, 2:25.**

**Fourth quarter**

- No scoring plays.

**Top passers**

- MIA – Bob Griese – 8/11, 98 yards, TD
- SDG – Dan Fouts – 22/30, 313 yards, TD, 2 INT

**Top rushers**

- MIA – Delvin Williams – 23 rushes, 92 yards
- SDG – Lydell Mitchell – 19 rushes, 77 yards, 2 TD

**Top receivers**

- MIA – Nat Moore – 4 receptions, 59 yards, TD
- SDG – Artie Owens – 3 receptions, 89 yards

A trio of Lydell Mitchell touchdowns were not enough for the Chargers to overcome five turnovers. The Chargers had 1st and Goal at the 4 when Fouts was sacked, losing a fumble that A. J. Duhe returned 68 yards to set up the game's opening touchdown; it was 14–0 shortly after another Fouts fumble. The quarterback rebounded with a 22-yard touchdown pass to Mitchell, but the Dolphins restored their 14-point lead after successfully gambling on 4th and goal from the 1 on the final play of the half.

In the 3rd quarter, Mitchell added a pair of 1 yard rushing scores, either side of another Miami touchdown, and San Diego trailed by just seven points entering the final period. However, they got no further than the Miami 44 on their final three possessions.

Fouts finished 22 of 30 for 313 yards and a touchdown, but threw a pair of 4th quarter interceptions to go with his earlier fumbles. Mitchell had 77 yards rushing and 64 receiving.

==== Week 8: at Detroit Lions ====
Week Eight: San Diego Chargers at Detroit Lions – Game summary

Quarter	1	2	3	4	Total
Chargers	7	0	0	7	**14**
**Lions**	17	14	0	0	**31**

at Pontiac Silverdome, Pontiac, Michigan

- Date: October 22
- Game time: 2:00 p.m. EDT
- Game weather: Dome
- Game attendance: 54,031
- Referee: Dick Jorgensen
- TV announcers (NBC): Curt Gowdy and John Brodie
- Box score

Game information

**First quarter**

- DET – Jesse Thompson 2-yard pass from Gary Danielson (Benny Ricardo kick), 9:46. Lions 7–0. **Drive: 9 plays, 84 yards, 3:30.**
- SDG – Lydell Mitchell 55-yard pass from Dan Fouts (Rolf Benirschke kick), 8:38. Tied 7–7. **Drive: 3 plays, 57 yards, 1:08.**
- DET – Benny Ricardo 22-yard field goal, 4:41. Lions 10–7. **Drive: 8 plays, 62 yards, 3:57.**
- DET – Lawrence Gaines 1-yard run (Benny Ricardo kick), 1:05. Lions 17–7. **Drive: 4 plays, 32 yards, 1:25.**

**Second quarter**

- DET – Dexter Bussey 18-yard pass from Gary Danielson (Benny Ricardo kick), 12:53. Lions 24–7. **Drive: 4 plays, 38 yards, 1:53.**
- DET – Jesse Thompson 6-yard pass from Gary Danielson (Benny Ricardo kick), 0:26. Lions 31–7. **Drive: 8 plays, 55 yards, 3:02.**

**Third quarter**

- No scoring plays.

**Fourth quarter**

- SDG – Charlie Joiner 25-yard pass from James Harris (Rolf Benirschke kick), 10:24. Lions 31–14. **Drive: 9 plays, 68 yards, 3:43.**

**Top passers**

- SDG – James Harris – 8/16, 132 yards, TD, INT
- DET – Gary Danielson – 22/32, 210 yards, 3 TD, INT

**Top rushers**

- SDG – Lydell Mitchell – 9 rushes, 53 yards
- DET – Dexter Bussey – 18 rushes, 91 yards

**Top receivers**

- SDG – Charlie Joiner – 5 receptions, 110 yards, TD
- DET – Dexter Bussey – 6 receptions, 61 yards, TD

A weak performance on rush defense saw the Chargers slip to a one-sided defeat. Detroit used a variety on runners while piling up 273 yards on the ground, from 39 carries. This enabled the Lions to score four touchdowns and a field goal from their first six possessions, all but winning the game in the first half. Fouts threw a 55-yard touchdown pass to Lydell Mitchell, briefly tying the scores at 7–7, but was intercepted three times in the first half. Two of these occurred only seven seconds apart: the Lions tried a field goal immediately after the first interception, but missed, and Fouts threw another as time expired in the half. James Harris came on in relief in the third quarter, and managed a consolation touchdown pass to Joiner.

Joiner gained 110 yards on 5 catches. The previous week, Detroit had run for just 22 yards while getting shut out by Atlanta.

==== Week 9: at Oakland Raiders ====
Week Nine: San Diego Chargers at Oakland Raiders – Game summary

Quarter	1	2	3	4	Total
**Chargers**	7	0	7	13	**27**
Raiders	0	20	0	3	**23**

at Oakland-Alameda County Coliseum, Oakland, California

- Date: October 29
- Game time: 1:00 p.m. PST
- Game weather: 58 °F (14.4 °C) relative humidity 67%, wind 11 miles per hour (18 km/h; 9.6 kn)
- Game attendance: 52,612
- Referee: Jim Tunney
- TV announcers (NBC): Charlie Jones and Len Dawson
- Box score

Game information

**First quarter**

- SDG – Hank Bauer 1-yard run (Rolf Benirschke kick), 10:22. Chargers 14–7. **Drive: 5 plays, 33 yards, 2:25.**

**Second quarter**

- OAK – Dave Casper 6-yard pass from Ken Stabler (run failed), 11:21. Tied 7–7. **Drive: 8 plays, 41 yards, 3:26.**
- OAK – Arthur Whittington 26-yard run (Errol Mann kick), 7:39. Chargers 20–14. **Drive: 5 plays, 49 yards, 1:04.**
- OAK – Mark van Eeghen 12-yard run (Errol Mann kick), 7:13. Chargers 20–14. **Drive: 1 play, 12 yards, 0:04.**

**Third quarter**

- SDG – Dan Fouts 1-yard run (Rolf Benirschke kick), 3:51. Chargers 20–7. **Drive: 20 plays, 80 yards, 11:09.**

**Fourth quarter**

- OAK – Errol Mann 25-yard field goal, 9:59. Raiders 21–20. **Drive: 16 plays, 48 yards, 8:52.**
- SDG – Rolf Benirschke 27-yard field goal, 6:08. Chargers 20–7. **Drive: 4 plays, 55 yards, 3:51.**
- SDG – Greg McCrary 29-yard pass from Dan Fouts (Rolf Benirschke kick), 0:52. Chargers 20–7. **Drive: 6 plays, 71 yards, 0:58.**
- SDG – Rolf Benirschke 32-yard field goal, 0:10. Chargers 20–7. **Drive: 4 plays, 0 yards, 0:19.**

**Top passers**

- SDG – Dan Fouts – 11/28, 165 yards, TD, INT
- OAK – Ken Stabler – 10/16, 119 yards, TD, INT

**Top rushers**

- SDG – Lydell Mitchell – 24 rushes, 92 yards
- OAK – Mark van Eeghen – 22 rushes, 93 yards, TD

**Top receivers**

- SDG – Lydell Mitchell – 5 receptions, 75 yards
- OAK – Dave Casper – 4 receptions, 43 yards, TD

San Diego came from behind to avenge their controversial Week 2 defeat. An 11-yard run by Bauer opened the scoring, but Oakland scored 20 unanswered points on three consecutive 2nd quarter drives, helped by two Fouts interceptions that set them up in good field position. The Chargers responded with a touchdown drive to start the second half, going 80 yards in 20 plays, taking 11 minutes off the clock. Lydell Mitchell converted a 4th and 1 on the drive, and Fouts ran it in from a yard out two plays later.

Following an exchange of field goals, the Chargers forced a punt and began on their own 29 with 1:50 to play. Oakland appeared to have stopped San Diego on downs, but a pass interference call against Lester Hayes prolonged the drive. One play later, Fouts hit tight end Greg McCrary by the right pylon for a 29-yard touchdown; this was McCrary's lone catch of the season. Woodrow Lowe then intercepted Ken Stabler, and the Chargers added a field goal in the final seconds.

==== Week 10: vs. Cincinnati Bengals ====
Week Ten: Cincinnati Bengals at San Diego Chargers – Game summary

Quarter	1	2	3	4	Total
Bengals	0	0	0	13	**13**
**Chargers**	3	3	13	3	**22**

at San Diego Stadium, San Diego, California

- Date: November 5
- Game time: 1:00 p.m. PST
- Game weather: 67 °F (19.4 °C) relative humidity 83%, wind 8 miles per hour (13 km/h; 7.0 kn)
- Game attendance: 43,639
- Referee: Don Wedge
- TV announcers (NBC): Jim Simpson and Paul Warfield
- Box score

Game information

**First quarter**

- SDG – Rolf Benirschke 26-yard field goal, 5:21. Chargers 3–0. **Drive: 18 plays, 59 yards, 8:44.**

**Second quarter**

- SDG – Rolf Benirschke 20-yard field goal, 0:23. Chargers 6–0. **Drive: 12 plays, 66 yards, 4:35.**

**Third quarter**

- SDG – Bob Klein 16-yard pass from Dan Fouts (Rolf Benirschke kick), 8:29. Chargers 13–0. **Drive: 5 plays, 80 yards, 2:07.**
- SDG – Mike Fuller 21-yard interception return (kick failed), 3:32. Chargers 19–0.

**Fourth quarter**

- SDG – Rolf Benirschke 37-yard field goal, 9:02. Chargers 22–0. **Drive: 8 plays, 37 yards, 3:02.**
- CIN – Rick Walker 3-yard pass from Ken Anderson (kick failed), 1:27. Chargers 22–6. **Drive: 5 plays, 76 yards, 1:03.**
- CIN – Billy Brooks 19-yard pass from Ken Anderson (Chris Bahr kick), 0:28. Chargers 22–13. **Drive: 6 plays, 49 yards, 0:55.**

**Top passers**

- CIN – Ken Anderson – 11/26, 131 yards, 2 TD, 3 INT
- SDG – Dan Fouts – 13/25, 162 yards, TD

**Top rushers**

- CIN – Deacon Turner – 16 rushes, 116 yards
- SDG – Lydell Mitchell – 28 rushes, 101 yards

**Top receivers**

- CIN – Billy Brooks – 3 receptions, 72 yards, TD
- SDG – John Jefferson – 6 receptions, 97 yards

Lydell Mitchell led a rushing attack which gained 173 yards on 49 carries, and San Diego won more easily than the final scoreline suggested. The Chargers twice drove inside the Cincinnati 10 in the first half, but settled for a pair of Benirschke field goals. A Bob Klein catch made it 13–0 in the 3rd quarter, whereupon the Bengals, who had posed little threat up until then, reached a 3rd and 7 at the Charger 22.

Mike Williams halted the threat with an end zone interception of Ken Anderson. Anderson's next pass was also intercepted, Mike Fuller snaring his second pick of the game, and running it back 21 yards for a game-breaking touchdown. It was 22–0 before the Bengals found the end zone twice in the final 1:27.

Mitchell ran for 101 yards on 28 carries.

==== Week 11: vs. Kansas City Chiefs ====
Week Eleven: Kansas City Chiefs at San Diego Chargers – Game summary

Quarter	1	2	3	4	OT	Total
Chiefs	0	6	7	10	0	**23**
**Chargers**	6	7	7	3	6	**29**

at San Diego Stadium, San Diego, California

- Date: November 12
- Game time: 1:00 p.m. PST
- Game weather: 58 °F (14.4 °C) relative humidity 65%, wind 14 miles per hour (23 km/h; 12 kn)
- Game attendance: 41,395
- Referee: Fred Wyant
- TV announcers (NBC): Jay Randolph and Mike Haffner
- Box score

Game information

**First quarter**

- SDG – Hank Bauer 1-yard run (kick failed), 3:49. Chargers 6–0. **Drive: 9 plays, 53 yards, 5:18.**

**Second quarter**

- KAN – Jan Stenerud 39-yard field goal, 8:22. Chargers 6–3. **Drive: 9 plays, 59 yards, 4:40.**
- SDG – Hank Bauer 1-yard run (Rolf Benirschke kick), 1:58. Chargers 13–3. **Drive: 12 plays, 68 yards, 6:24.**
- KAN – Jan Stenerud 20-yard field goal, 0:01. Chargers 13–6. **Drive: 9 plays, 58 yards, 1:57.**

**Third quarter**

- KAN – Arnold Morgado 1-yard run (Jan Stenerud kick), 10:55. Tied 13–13. **Drive: 6 plays, 30 yards, 3:13.**
- SDG – John Jefferson 46-yard pass from Dan Fouts (Rolf Benirschke kick), 5:09. Chargers 20–13. **Drive: 2 plays, 52 yards, 0:49.**

**Fourth quarter**

- KAN – Arnold Morgado 5-yard run (Jan Stenerud kick), 5:22. Tied 20–20. **Drive: 8 plays, 37 yards, 2:55.**
- SDG – Rolf Benirschke 28-yard field goal, 1:27. Chargers 23–20. **Drive: 8 plays, 59 yards, 3:55.**
- KAN – Jan Stenerud 47-yard field goal, 0:02. Tied 23–23. **Drive: 8 plays, 40 yards, 1:25.**

**Overtime**

- SDG – John Jefferson 14-yard pass from Dan Fouts, 0:00. Chargers 29–23. **Drive: 7 plays, 38 yards, 1:43.**

**Top passers**

- KAN – Mike Livingston – 19/28, 224 yards
- SDG – Dan Fouts – 13/20, 188 yards, 2 TD

**Top rushers**

- KAN – Arnold Morgado – 29 rushes, 115 yards, 2 TD
- SDG – Lydell Mitchell – 29 rushes, 144 yards

**Top receivers**

- KAN – Tony Reed – 9 receptions, 91 yards
- SDG – John Jefferson – 7 receptions, 130 yards, 2 TD

The Chargers overcame dubious clock management to claim the win. Their first touchdown drive featured nine consecutive runs, opening with Lydell Mitchell's 25-yard burst and ending with Hank Bauer driving over from a yard out. Bauer later finished off a drive featuring eleven runs and one pass with another score from the same distance, and the Chargers led 13–3.

Kansas City tied the game with scores either side of halftime, before Fouts went deep for Jefferson, who outran single coverage and hauled in a 46-yard touchdown pass near to the goal line. The Charger defense then foiled Kansas City on a 4th and 1 from the 3, but the Chiefs tied the scores on their next drive, Arnold Morgado running in his second touchdown of the game. Benirschke put San Diego back in front with 1:27 to play, but Jan Stenerud responded in kind with 2 seconds on the clock — his 47-yarder struck the uprights just behind the centre of the crossbar.

Both sides wasted opportunities in overtime. First, Kansas City marched to a 3rd and 1 at the Charger 14; Morgado had converted a 4th down en route, but he fumbled, and Mike Fuller recovered. San Diego's response was a near mirror-image, Bauer converting on 4th down before Mitchell fumbled, having gained 9 yards on 1st and 10 from the 19. Kansas City recovered, but went 3 and out, giving San Diego a final chance at the Chief 38 with 1:43 to play. Two completions to Jefferson moved the ball to the 15, whereupon Fouts was almost intercepted with 42 seconds on the clock. A running play netted a single yard, after which San Diego let the clock run down to just four seconds before snapping the ball with the offense still on the field. The clock expired as Fouts threw for the end zone, costing the Chargers any opportunity for a field goal, but Jefferson's marker slipped, leaving him open to catch the ball inches above the ground.

Mitchell ran for 144 yards on 29 carries, while Jefferson caught 7 passes for 130 yards and two scores. The winning touchdown, at 75:00, is the latest in any regular season game.

==== Week 12: at Minnesota Vikings ====
Week Twelve: San Diego Chargers at Minnesota Vikings – Game summary

Quarter	1	2	3	4	Total
**Chargers**	7	0	6	0	**13**
Vikings	7	0	0	0	**7**

at Metropolitan Stadium, Bloomington, Minnesota

- Date: November 19
- Game time: 12:00 p.m. CST
- Game weather: 16 °F (−8.9 °C) relative humidity 66%, wind 14 miles per hour (23 km/h; 12 kn), wind chill 1 °F (−17.2 °C)
- Game attendance: 38,859
- Referee: Red Cashion
- TV announcers (NBC): Curt Gowdy and John Brodie
- Box score

Game information

**First quarter**

- MIN – Rickey Young 10-yard pass from Fran Tarkenton (Rick Danmeier kick), 8:32. Vikings 7–0. **Drive: 3 plays, 45 yards, 0:50.**
- SDG – Hank Bauer 2-yard run (Rolf Benirschke kick), 2:27. Tied 7–7. **Drive: 10 plays, 75 yards, 6:05.**

**Second quarter**

- No scoring plays.

**Third quarter**

- SDG – John Jefferson 10-yard pass from Dan Fouts (kick failed), 2:39. Chargers 13–7. **Drive: 6 plays, 33 yards, 3:37.**

**Fourth quarter**

- No scoring plays.

**Top passers**

- SDG – Dan Fouts – 9/19, 131 yards, TD, 2 INT
- MIN – Fran Tarkenton – 27/42, 230 yards, TD, 2 INT

**Top rushers**

- SDG – Don Woods – 23 rushes, 76 yards
- MIN – Chuck Foreman – 13 rushes, 42 yards

**Top receivers**

- SDG – Bob Klein – 6 receptions, 69 yards
- MIN – Chuck Foreman – 9 receptions, 76 yards

San Diego evened their record with victory at a frigid Metropolitan Stadium. Icy conditions caused numerous errors, with the Charger defense edging the takeaway battle 4–3. After an early Viking touchdown, San Diego responded on their next possession with Bauer's short-range touchdown run. Both sides wasted opportunities in the 2nd quarter. First, Minnesota reached the Charger 13, from where Fran Tarkenton's pass was picked off in the end zone by Pete Shaw. Later, Fouts found Jefferson for a 40-yard gain, and Bauer converted a 4th down to set up 1st and goal from the 2, but he fumbled on the next play, and the ball went through the end zone for a touchback.

The winning score came with 2:30 to play in the 3rd quarter. On 3rd and 9 from the Viking 10, Fouts stumbled on his dropback but got to his feet and fired a pass through heavy traffic to Jefferson in the front of the end zone. Minnesota had five possessions after that, their best chance coming on the final one, when they reached the Charger 30 before Fred Dean pounced on a loose ball to end the threat. Fouts had been forced from the game with an injury, but San Diego ran the final 3:26 off the clock by picking up four first downs with James Harris under centre.

This result left the Chargers two wins back in the wildcard race with four weeks to play.

==== Week 13: at Kansas City Chiefs ====
Week Thirteen: San Diego Chargers at Kansas City Chiefs – Game summary

Quarter	1	2	3	4	Total
Chargers	0	0	0	0	**0**
**Chiefs**	0	17	3	3	**23**

at Arrowhead Stadium, Kansas City, Missouri

- Date: November 26
- Game time: 1:00 p.m. CST
- Game weather: 40 °F (4.4 °C) relative humidity 94%, wind 19 miles per hour (31 km/h; 17 kn)
- Game attendance: 26,248
- Referee: Ben Dreith
- TV announcers (NBC): Jay Randolph and Mike Haffner
- Box score

Game information

**First quarter**

- No scoring plays.

**Second quarter**

- KAN – Jan Stenerud 32-yard field goal, 7:17. Chiefs 3–0. **Drive: 6 plays, 18 yards, 2:40.**
- KAN – Henry Marshall 29-yard pass from Mike Livingston (Jan Stenerud kick), 1:42. Chiefs 10–0. **Drive: 8 plays, 67 yards, 3:09.**
- KAN – Larry Dorsey 6-yard pass from Mike Livingston (Jan Stenerud kick), 0:44. Chiefs 17–0. **Drive: 7 plays, 47 yards, 6:24.**

**Third quarter**

- KAN – Jan Stenerud 37-yard field goal, 11:12. Chiefs 20–0. **Drive: 4 plays, 6 yards, 1:23.**

**Fourth quarter**

- KAN – Jan Stenerud 35-yard field goal, 11:36. Chiefs 23–0. **Drive: 8 plays, 30 yards, 4:05.**

**Top passers**

- SDG – James Harris – 15/41, 164 yards, 5 INT
- KAN – Mike Livingston – 13/21, 136 yards, 2 TD

**Top rushers**

- SDG – Lydell Mitchell – 14 rushes, 58 yards
- KAN – Ted McKnight – 11 rushes, 104 yards

**Top receivers**

- SDG – John Jefferson – 3 receptions, 43 yards
- KAN – Henry Marshall – 2 receptions, 36 yards, TD

James Harris had a rough game in relief of Dan Fouts as the Chargers were shut out and all but eliminated from the playoff race. He completed 15 of 41 for 164 yards and a career-high 5 interceptions, including three on consecutive possessions around halftime. Kansas City also turned the ball over three times, but ran for 238 yards and did put sufficient points on the board.

San Diego's best scoring chances came in the 3rd quarter — down 20–0, they reached the Chief's 12-yard line before Bo Matthews lost a fumble. The Chiefs fumbled it straight back, but Lydell Mitchell was then stopped a yard short on 4th down.

==== Week 14: vs. Chicago Bears ====
Week Fourteen: Chicago Bears at San Diego Chargers – Game summary

Quarter	1	2	3	4	Total
Bears	0	0	7	0	**7**
**Chargers**	17	6	10	7	**40**

at San Diego Stadium, San Diego, California

- Date: December 4
- Game time: 6:00 p.m. PST
- Game weather: 56 °F (13.3 °C) relative humidity 51%, wind 7 miles per hour (11 km/h; 6.1 kn)
- Game attendance: 48,492
- Referee: Bob Frederic
- TV announcers (ABC): Frank Gifford, Howard Cosell and Don Meredith
- Box score

Game information

**First quarter**

- SDG – Rolf Benirschke 32-yard field goal, 12:29. Chargers 3–0. **Drive: 7 plays, 53 yards, 2:31.**
- SDG – Lydell Mitchell 1-yard run (Rolf Benirschke kick), 11:19. Chargers 10–0. **Drive: 2 plays, 47 yards, 0:57.**
- SDG – Larry Burton 16-yard pass from Dan Fouts (Rolf Benirschke kick), 4:29. Chargers 17–0. **Drive: 9 plays, 64 yards, 5:02.**

**Second quarter**

- SDG – John Jefferson 42-yard pass from Dan Fouts (kick failed), 14:08. Chargers 23–0. **Drive: 1 play, 42 yards, 0:06.**

**Third quarter**

- SDG – Rolf Benirschke 44-yard field goal, 8:10. Chargers 26–0. **Drive: 12 plays, 61 yards, 6:35.**
- SDG – Hank Bauer 37-yard run (Rolf Benirschke kick), 5:40. Chargers 33–0. **Drive: 3 plays, 48 yards, 1:13.**
- CHI – Virgil Livers 60-yard interception return (Bob Thomas kick), 1:07. Chargers 33–7.

**Fourth quarter**

- SDG – Larry Burton 34-yard pass from James Harris (Rolf Benirschke kick), 14:13. Chargers 40–7. **Drive: 6 plays, 63 yards, 1:44.**

**Top passers**

- CHI – Vince Evans – 1/2, 38 yards, INT
- SDG – Dan Fouts – 16/24, 269 yards, 2 TD, 2 INT

**Top rushers**

- CHI – Walter Payton – 17 rushes, 50 yards
- SDG – Don Woods – 12 rushes, 50 yards

**Top receivers**

- CHI – James Scott – 2 receptions, 58 yards
- SDG – John Jefferson – 7 receptions, 155 yards, TD

With Dan Fouts back in the starting line-up, the Chargers cut loose on Monday Night Football. While Chicago fumbled their first kickoff and followed that with a pair of three-and-outs, Fouts set up one touchdown with a 46-yard completion to John Jefferson, and followed that with scoring passes to Charger debutant Larry Burton (16 yards) and Jefferson (42 yards); it was 23–0 less than a minute into the 2nd quarter. In the second half, Bauer broke two tackles at the line of scrimmage, and raced away for a career-long 37-yard touchdown. James Harris came in and threw a pick six for the only Bears points, but redeemed himself by finding Burton for another touchdown.

San Diego outgained the Bears by 481 yards to 112, the smallest yardage they'd given up for 17 years. Fouts was 16 of 24 for 269 yards, 2 touchdowns and 2 interceptions, while Jefferson caught 7 passes for 155 yards and a touchdown.

==== Week 15: vs. Seattle Seahawks ====
Week Fifteen: Seattle Seahawks at San Diego Chargers – Game summary

Quarter	1	2	3	4	Total
Seahawks	7	3	0	0	**10**
**Chargers**	3	17	0	17	**37**

at San Diego Stadium, San Diego, California

- Date: December 10
- Game time: 6:00 p.m. PST
- Game weather: 52 °F (11.1 °C) relative humidity 51%, wind 8 miles per hour (13 km/h; 7.0 kn)
- Game attendance: 49,975
- Referee: Pat Haggerty
- TV announcers (NBC): Jim Simpson and Paul Warfield
- Box score

Game information

**First quarter**

- SDG – Rolf Benirschke 37-yard field goal, 8:21. Chargers 3–0. **Drive: 9 plays, 33 yards, 4:42.**
- SEA – David Sims 2-yard pass from Jim Zorn (Efren Herrera kick), 2:20. Seahawks 7–3. **Drive: 11 plays, 76 yards, 6:01.**

**Second quarter**

- SEA – Efren Herrera 48-yard field goal, 12:44. Seahawks 10–3. **Drive: 9 plays, 27 yards, 3:10.**
- SDG – Rolf Benirschke 26-yard field goal, 4:33. Seahawks 10–6. **Drive: 11 plays, 56 yards, 3:58.**
- SDG – John Jefferson 31-yard pass from Dan Fouts (Rolf Benirschke kick), 1:56. Chargers 13–10. **Drive: 3 plays, 57 yards, 1:07.**
- SDG – John Jefferson 6-yard pass from Dan Fouts (Rolf Benirschke kick), 0:22. Chargers 20–10. **Drive: 3 plays, 39 yards, 0:26.**

**Third quarter**

- No scoring plays.

**Fourth quarter**

- SDG – Larry Burton 55-yard pass from Dan Fouts (Rolf Benirschke kick), 14:06. Chargers 27–10. **Drive: 4 plays, 68 yards, 1:27.**
- SDG – Hank Bauer 1-yard run (Rolf Benirschke kick), 9:58. Chargers 34–10. **Drive: 4 plays, 44 yards, 1:53.**
- SDG – Rolf Benirschke 27-yard field goal, 6:51. Chargers 37–10. **Drive: 6 plays, 22 yards, 2:53.**

**Top passers**

- SEA – Jim Zorn – 14/31, 150 yards, TD, INT
- SDG – Dan Fouts – 22/33, 279 yards, 3 TD, INT

**Top rushers**

- SEA – Sherman Smith – 10 rushes, 63 yards
- SDG – Don Woods – 11 rushes, 47 yards

**Top receivers**

- SEA – Steve Largent – 3 receptions, 46 yards
- SDG – John Jefferson – 5 receptions, 82 yards, 2 TD

While Miami's win in the early slate of games officially eliminated San Diego from the playoffs, they did score another one-sided win. Seattle led 10–6 before Fouts threw a pair of touchdowns to Jefferson in the final two minutes of the first half, sandwiching a Fuller interception. Further scores by Larry Burton (a 55-yard reception) and Bauer (a 1-yard run) followed, as San Diego cruised after the break.

Dan Fouts completed 22 of 33 for 279 yards, 3 touchdowns and 1 interception. On the defensive side of the ball, six sacks were split amongst as many players.

==== Week 16: at Houston Oilers ====
Week Sixteen: San Diego Chargers at Houston Oilers – Game summary

Quarter	1	2	3	4	Total
**Chargers**	0	21	10	14	**45**
Oilers	0	17	0	7	**24**

at Astrodome, Houston, Texas

- Date: December 17
- Game time: 3:00 p.m. CST
- Game weather: Dome
- Game attendance: 49,554
- Referee: Cal Lepore
- TV announcers (NBC): Curt Gowdy and John Brodie
- Box score

Game information

**First quarter**

- No scoring plays.

**Second quarter**

- SDG – John Jefferson 33-yard pass from Dan Fouts (Rolf Benirschke kick), 13:45. Chargers 7–0. **Drive: 8 plays, 80 yards, 2:47.**
- HOU – Robert Woods 21-yard pass from Dan Pastorini (Toni Fritsch kick), 12:16. Tied 7–7. **Drive: 3 plays, 70 yards, 1:29.**
- HOU – Toni Fritsch 43-yard field goal, 7:24. Oilers 10–7. **Drive: 8 plays, 43 yards, 3:43.**
- SDG – Dwight McDonald 37-yard pass from Dan Fouts (Rolf Benirschke kick), 4:43. Chargers 14–10. **Drive: 7 plays, 61 yards, 2:41.**
- SDG – Don Woods 3-yard run (Rolf Benirschke kick), 2:03. Chargers 21–10. **Drive: 6 plays, 60 yards, 1:40.**
- HOU – Ronnie Coleman 7-yard pass from Dan Pastorini (Toni Fritsch kick), 0:28. Chargers 21–17. **Drive: 5 plays, 30 yards, 0:28.**

**Third quarter**

- SDG – Rolf Benirschke 19-yard field goal, 10:59. Chargers 24–17. **Drive: 10 plays, 42 yards, 3:12.**
- SDG – Bob Klein 10-yard pass from Dan Fouts (Rolf Benirschke kick), 6:01. Chargers 31–17. **Drive: 7 plays, 48 yards, 3:15.**

**Fourth quarter**

- HOU – Tim Wilson 2-yard pass from Dan Pastorini (Toni Fritsch kick), 13:38. Chargers 31–24. **Drive: 6 plays, 67 yards, 2:04.**
- SDG – Don Woods 18-yard run (Rolf Benirschke kick), 9:49. Chargers 38–24. **Drive: 8 plays, 80 yards, 3:49.**
- SDG – John Jefferson 36-yard pass from Dan Fouts (Rolf Benirschke kick), 7:37. Chargers 45–24. **Drive: 1 play, 36 yards, 0:08.**

**Top passers**

- HOU – Dan Pastorini – 14/29, 165 yards, 3 TD, 2 INT
- SDG – Dan Fouts – 21/40, 369 yards, 4 TD, 2 INT

**Top rushers**

- HOU – Earl Campbell – 14 rushes, 77 yards
- SDG – Don Woods – 16 rushes, 53 yards, 2 TD

**Top receivers**

- HOU – Ken Burrough – 3 receptions, 67 yards
- SDG – John Jefferson – 6 receptions, 149 yards, 2 TD

The Chargers signed off for the year by routing the playoff-bound Oilers in their own stadium. Despite turning the ball over three times in the first half, they led 21–17 at the break, courtesy of touchdown receptions by Jefferson and Dwight McDonald (in his final game with the club), plus a short run by Don Woods. A chip-shot field goal by Benirschke and a Bob Klein touchdown catch followed on the first two Charger possessions of the second half, pushing the lead to 14 points.

Houston then stopped San Diego on downs, and halved the deficit early in the 4th quarter. The Chargers quashed any thoughts of a comeback on their next two possessions. First, they went 80 yards on 8 plays, Fouts converting a 3rd and 13 with a 19-yard completion to Jefferson before Woods ran in his last career touchdown from 18 yards out. Then Fuller returned a punt 32 yards to the Oiler 36, and Fouts hit Jefferson for the clinching score a play later.

Fouts completed 21 of 40 attempts, for 369 yards, 4 touchdowns and 2 interceptions. The yardage total was a personal best, and tied Tobin Rote's club record from the 1963 season. Jefferson caught 6 balls for 149 yards and 2 touchdowns. San Diego won their final three games by a combined score of 122–41; the 45 points in this game were their most for seven years.

== Standings ==
AFC West
	W	L	T	PCT	DIV	CONF	PF	PA	STK
^{(3)} Denver Broncos	10	6	0	.625	7–1	8–4	282	198	L1
Oakland Raiders	9	7	0	.563	3–5	5–7	311	283	W1
Seattle Seahawks	9	7	0	.563	4–4	6–6	345	358	W1
San Diego Chargers	9	7	0	.563	5–3	7–5	355	309	W3
Kansas City Chiefs	4	12	0	.250	1–7	4–10	243	327	L2

== Awards ==
Three Chargers were named to the 1979 Pro Bowl, with one each named first and second team Associated Press (AP) All-Pros. Also, Jefferson received 1 of the 84 available votes as AP NFL Offensive Rookie of the Year, and Coryell had at least one vote as NFL Coach of the Year.

Player	Position	Pro Bowl starter	Pro Bowl reserve	AP 1st team All-Pro	AP 2nd team All-Pro
John Jefferson	Wide receiver		Yes		Yes
Louie Kelcher	Defensive tackle	Yes		Yes	
Russ Washington	Tackle	Yes			
