= List of NFL tied games =

In the National Football League (NFL), a tied game occurs when a regular season game ends with both teams having an equal score after one 10-minute overtime period. Ties have counted as a half-win and half-loss in league standings since 1972; before that, ties were not counted in the standings at all. Tie games were once frequent in the NFL, but have become uncommon due to a rule change in 1974 that extended the existing sudden-death overtime for postseason games into the regular season. As a result, ties are most often the result of mishaps or mistakes from the teams involved. Tied games are considered to be the least desired outcome a football game can produce.

From 1920 to 1973, there were a total of 290 tied games. Only three seasons prior to the rule change went without a tied game, while five seasons had at least ten ties. The most ties, 17, occurred in the 1920 season. Since overtime was introduced in 1974, there have been 31 tied games. The most ties recorded in a season since the introduction of overtime is two; this has happened in five seasons (1986, 1997, 2016, 2018, and 2022). The most recent tie game occurred on October 11, 2026, when the New York Giants and Washington Commanders played to a 27–27 draw. The Jacksonville Jaguars, who joined the NFL in 1995, are the only current NFL team that has never recorded a tied game. However, seven other teams have not recorded a tie since the 1974 rule change: the Buffalo Bills, Chicago Bears, Las Vegas Raiders, Los Angeles Chargers, New England Patriots, New Orleans Saints, and Tennessee Titans.

== 1920–1973 ==
=== National Football League ===
Season	No. of ties
1920 (Note: No official standings were recorded throughout the 1920 season and teams played games against opponents outside of the league.)	17
1921	7
1922	9
1923	13
1924	7
1925	9
1926	14
1927	6
1928	6
1929	10
1930	7
1931	3
1932	10
1933	5
1934	0
1935	4
1936	2
1937	3
1938	3
1939	3
1940	4
1941	2
1942	1
1943	3
1944	3
1945	1
1946	3
1947	2
1948	1
1949	3
1950	0
1951	3
1952	0
1953	3
1954	2
1955	3
1956	2
1957	1
1958	3
1959	1
1960 (Note: The American Football League was founded in 1960 and played as a separate league until 1969, after which it merged with the NFL. The modern NFL considers the 1960s history and records of the AFL to be a part of its own, however, AFL tied games are tabulated separately in this section.)	5
1961	3
1962	4
1963	5
1964	6
1965	2
1966	5
1967	9
1968	4
1969	5
1970	9
1971	8
1972	5
1973	7

=== All-America Football Conference (1946–1949) ===
Season	No. of ties
1946	4
1947	4
1948	0
1949	2

=== American Football League (1960–1969) ===
Season	No. of ties
1960	1
1961	1
1962	1
1963	3
1964	3
1965	5
1966	4
1967	2
1968	1
1969	3

== 1974–2011 ==
In 1974, the NFL instituted a single sudden-death 15-minute overtime period for all games that were tied at the end of regulation. During these seasons, a total of 494 regular season games went to overtime, 17 (3.4%) of which ended in a tie.

Key
Symbol	Meaning
Team (#)	Denotes the number of times the team has tied a game since 1974.

No.	Date	Away team	Home team	Score	Notes
1	September 22, 1974	Pittsburgh Steelers	Denver Broncos	35–35	First regular-season overtime game in NFL history. As of 2026 it remains the most recent tie recorded by a team (the Steelers) that went on to win the Super Bowl.
2	September 19, 1976	Los Angeles Rams	Minnesota Vikings	10–10	With about a minute left in overtime, Vikings quarterback Fran Tarkenton's pass was intercepted by Rams linebacker Rick Kay at the Rams' 1-yard line. The Rams then conceded the tie with the ball deep in their own territory.
3	November 26, 1978	Minnesota Vikings (2)	Green Bay Packers	10–10	Both teams finished the season with an 8–7–1 record. The Vikings won the NFC Central over the Packers by virtue of a 1–0–1 head-to-head record.
4	October 12, 1980	Green Bay Packers (2)	Tampa Bay Buccaneers	14–14	
5	October 4, 1981	New York Jets	Miami Dolphins	28–28	Jets kicker Pat Leahy missed a 48-yard field goal as time expired in overtime.
6	December 19, 1982	Green Bay Packers (3)	Baltimore Colts	20–20	The Colts, who eventually finished their season at 0–8–1, (Note: The 1982 season was reduced from 16 to 9 games because of a 57-day players' strike.) overcame a 20–6 fourth-quarter deficit. Packers kicker Jan Stenerud missed wide right from 47 yards with 2:00 remaining.
7	October 24, 1983	New York Giants	St. Louis Cardinals	20–20	Only overtime tie to date on Monday Night Football. Cardinals kicker Neil O'Donoghue missed three field-goal attempts in the extra period from 45, 20 and 42 yards, the last two in the final 66 seconds.
8	November 4, 1984	Philadelphia Eagles	Detroit Lions	23–23	
9	October 19, 1986	San Francisco 49ers	Atlanta Falcons	10–10	
10	December 7, 1986	St. Louis Cardinals (2)	Philadelphia Eagles (2)	10–10	Cardinals kicker Eric Schubert missed two field goals, including a 37-yarder in the final seconds of overtime. Eagles kicker Paul McFadden missed a 43-yard field goal in the extra period.
11	September 20, 1987	Denver Broncos (2)	Green Bay Packers (4)	17–17	Game played in Milwaukee.
12	October 2, 1988	Kansas City Chiefs	New York Jets (2)	17–17	Jets running back Freeman McNeil lost a fumble at the Chiefs' 15 yard line in the final minute of overtime.
13	November 19, 1989	Kansas City Chiefs (2)	Cleveland Browns	10–10	Chiefs kicker Nick Lowery, one of the most accurate kickers during the 1989 season, played poorly on the sloppy turf of Cleveland Municipal Stadium. He missed a 45-yard field goal that would have won it for the Chiefs with four seconds left in regulation. In overtime, he had a chance to win the game on a 47-yard attempt with 3 seconds left, but missed that one as well.
14	November 16, 1997	Philadelphia Eagles (3)	Baltimore Ravens	10–10	Each team had an unsuccessful field-goal attempt in overtime; Ravens kicker Matt Stover missed wide right from 53 yards with 2:21 remaining, Eagles kicker Chris Boniol also missed wide right from 40 yards on the last play of the game.
15	November 23, 1997	New York Giants (2)	Washington Redskins	7–7	First overtime tie in the league's Sunday Night Football slot.
16	November 10, 2002	Atlanta Falcons (2)	Pittsburgh Steelers (2)	34–34	Atlanta mounted a 17-point comeback to force overtime. Steelers wide receiver Plaxico Burress was stopped one yard short of the end zone on the final play of overtime.
17	November 16, 2008	Philadelphia Eagles (4)	Cincinnati Bengals	13–13	Bengals kicker Shayne Graham missed a 47-yard field goal with seven seconds left in overtime. At the post-game press conference, Eagles quarterback Donovan McNabb said that he did not know games could end tied.

== 2012–2016 ==
In 2012, the NFL instituted a modified sudden-death overtime system to prevent a field goal from the team that received the kickoff from ending the game. During these seasons, a total of 83 regular season games went to overtime, 5 (6.0%) of which ended in a tie.

No.	Date	Away team	Home team	Score	Notes
1	November 11, 2012	St. Louis Rams (2)	San Francisco 49ers (2)	24–24	The Rams had a game-winning field goal taken away because of a penalty. Both teams missed field goal attempts in overtime.
2	November 24, 2013	Minnesota Vikings (3)	Green Bay Packers (5)	26–26	The Packers scored 16 unanswered points in the fourth quarter to force overtime. Both teams scored a field goal in the overtime period.
3	October 12, 2014	Carolina Panthers	Cincinnati Bengals (2)	37–37	Both teams scored a field goal in the overtime period. Bengals kicker Mike Nugent missed a 36-yard field goal attempt as time expired in overtime.
4	October 23, 2016	Seattle Seahawks	Arizona Cardinals (3)	6–6	Cardinals kicker Chandler Catanzaro and Seahawks kicker Steven Hauschka missed consecutive field goals from short distances late in overtime after having each made one earlier in the period. Cardinals quarterback Carson Palmer threw a Hail Mary pass that was knocked out of the endzone at the end of overtime.
5	October 30, 2016	Washington Redskins (2)	Cincinnati Bengals (3)	27–27	First overtime game played at Wembley Stadium in London, and the first tie game played outside the United States. Neither team scored in the overtime period. Redskins kicker Dustin Hopkins missed a 34-yard field goal in overtime which would have won the game.

== 2017–2024 ==
In 2017, the NFL shortened overtime from 15 minutes to 10 minutes for regular season games with the intent of reducing the risk of injury, despite concerns that this could lead to more ties. During these seasons, a total of 118 regular season games went to overtime, 7 (5.9%) of which ended in a tie.

No.	Date	Away team	Home team	Score	Notes
1	September 9, 2018	Pittsburgh Steelers (3)	Cleveland Browns (2)	21–21	Both Steelers kicker Chris Boswell and Browns kicker Zane Gonzalez missed field goals in the final two minutes of overtime. This was the first Week 1 tie since 1971. This tie ended a 17-game losing streak for the Browns that dated back to the 2016 season.
2	September 16, 2018	Minnesota Vikings (4)	Green Bay Packers (6)	29–29	Packers kicker Mason Crosby made what would have been a game-winning field goal as time expired in regulation, but the Vikings called timeout before the play and Crosby missed his second attempt, sending the game to overtime. Vikings kicker Daniel Carlson missed two field goals in overtime, one as time expired, and was waived by the team the next day.
3	September 8, 2019	Detroit Lions (2)	Arizona Cardinals (4)	27–27	The Cardinals trailed by 18 points during the fourth quarter. Both teams kicked a field goal in the extra period. With 10 seconds remaining, Lions quarterback Matthew Stafford threw an incomplete pass that was nearly intercepted by Cardinals cornerback Tramaine Brock.
4	September 27, 2020	Cincinnati Bengals (4)	Philadelphia Eagles (5)	23–23	
5	November 14, 2021	Detroit Lions (3)	Pittsburgh Steelers (4)	16–16	This tie ended a 12-game losing streak for the Lions dating back to 2020. The Steelers lost two fumbles in Detroit territory during the overtime period. Steelers running back Najee Harris noted in the postgame press conference that he did not know an NFL game could end in a tie.
6	September 11, 2022	Indianapolis Colts (2)	Houston Texans	20–20	The Colts scored 17 unanswered points in the final 11 minutes of regulation. Neither team scored in the extra period. The Colts released kicker Rodrigo Blankenship after he missed a potential game-winning field goal in overtime.
7	December 4, 2022	Washington Commanders (3)	New York Giants (3)	20–20	Giants kicker Graham Gano missed a 58-yard field goal as time expired.

== 2025–present ==
In 2025, the NFL changed the overtime rules to allow both teams to have possession during the overtime period, even if the first team scores a touchdown, with the overtime remaining at 10 minutes. Through Week 9 of the 2026 season, a total of 26 regular season games went to overtime, 2 (7.7%) of which ended in a tie.

No.	Date	Away team	Home team	Score	Notes
1	September 28, 2025	Green Bay Packers (7)	Dallas Cowboys	40–40	Cowboys kicker Brandon Aubrey made a go-ahead field goal with 4:40 left in overtime, and Packers kicker Brandon McManus made the game-tying field goal as time expired. This was the first tied game to have a game-tying score as time expired in overtime. This was the second highest-scoring tie in NFL history, and the highest since the introduction of overtime.
2	October 11, 2026	New York Giants (4)	Washington Commanders (4)	27–27	Giants running back Cam Skattebo lost a fumble at the Washington 24-yard line with 2:00 remaining. With 0:10 remaining, the Commanders were in field goal range but ran a play and were out of timeouts and could not stop the clock in time. The Commanders were widely criticized for their clock management during the end-of-game sequence.

== Notes ==
Notes

Footnotes

== General references ==
- "Past Standings (1920–2013)" (PDF). National Football League. Archived from the original (PDF) on January 24, 2014.
- Sessler, Mike (November 11, 2012). "Rams-49ers play to tie in game fueled by weirdness". National Football League.
