= 1978 Minnesota Vikings season =

NFL team season

- General manager: Mike Lynn
- Head coach: Bud Grant
- Home stadium: Metropolitan Stadium

Results
- Record: 8–7–1
- Division place: 1st NFC Central
- Playoffs: Lost Divisional Playoffs (at Rams) 10–34
- Pro Bowlers: LB Matt Blair; WR Ahmad Rashad

Uniform
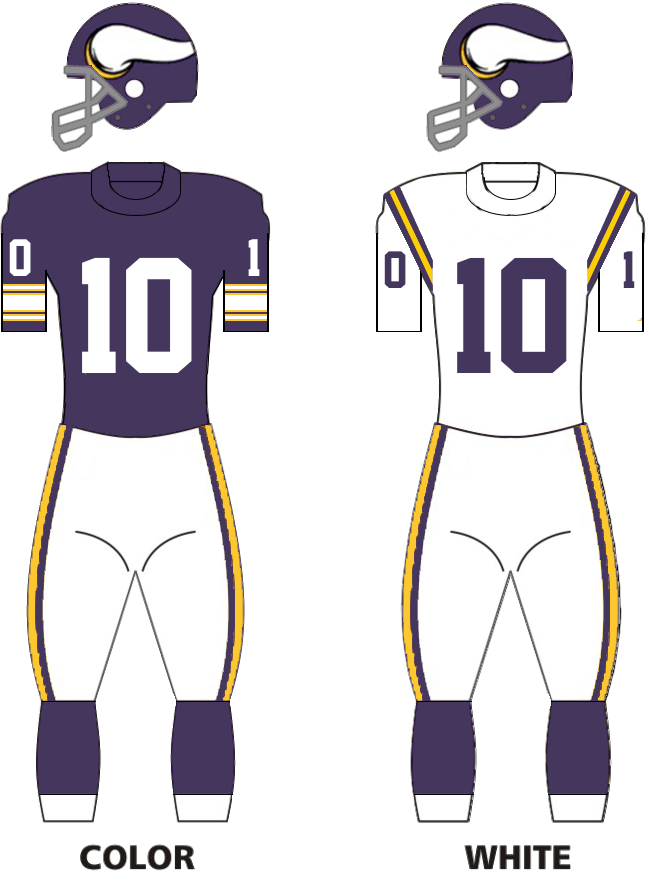

The 1978 season was the Minnesota Vikings' 18th in the National Football League (NFL). The Vikings finished with an 8–7–1 record, and finished in first place in the NFC Central division, despite having a regular season point differential of minus 12. The team appeared in the playoffs for the 10th time in 11 years. In the divisional round, the Vikings lost 34–10 to the Los Angeles Rams. Following the season, longtime quarterback Fran Tarkenton retired.

== Offseason ==
=== 1978 draft ===
1978 Minnesota Vikings Draft
Draft order		Player name	Position	College	Notes
Round	Selection	Player name	Position	College	Notes
1	21	Randy Holloway	Defensive end	Pittsburgh	
2	48	John Turner	Defensive back	Miami (FL)	
3	75	Whip Walton	Linebacker	San Diego State	
4	100	Jim Hough	Center	Utah State	
5	132	Traded to the New York Giants (Note: The Vikings traded a fifth-round selection (132nd overall) to the New York Giants in exchange for TE Bob Tucker.)			
6	159	Traded to the San Francisco 49ers (Note: The Vikings traded a sixth-round selection (159th overall) to the San Francisco 49ers in exchange for DB Windlan Hall and CB Nate Allen.)			
7	186	Traded to the Philadelphia Eagles (Note: The Vikings traded a seventh-round selection (186th overall) to the Philadelphia Eagles in exchange for S Bill Bradley.)			
8	204	Mike Wood	Placekicker	Southeast Missouri State	From Seahawks (Note: The Vikings traded S Autry Beamon and LB Amos Martin to the Seattle Seahawks in exchange for an eighth-round selection (204th overall).)
8	213	Traded to the New York Jets (Note: The Vikings traded their eighth-round selection (213th overall) and a 1979 10th-round selection (263rd overall) to the New York Jets in exchange for S Phil Wise.)			
9	240	Mike Deutsch	Punter	Colorado State	
10	272	Hughie Shaw	Running back	Texas A&I	
11	299	Ron Harris	Running back	Colorado State	
12	326	Jeff Morrow	Offensive tackle	Minnesota	

=== Undrafted free agents ===
1978 undrafted free agents of note
Player	Position	College
Kevin Miller	Wide receiver	Louisville
Harry Washington	Wide receiver	Colorado State

== Roster ==
1978 Minnesota Vikings roster
Quarterbacks (QB): 9 Tommy Kramer; 19 Bob Lee; 10 Fran Tarkenton; Running backs (RB): 44 Chuck Foreman; 48 Sammy Johnson; 39 Mark Kellar; 33 Brent McClanahan; 35 Robert Miller; 34 Rickey Young; Wide receivers (WR): 87 Kevin Miller; 28 Ahmad Rashad; 80 Harry Washington; 85 Sammy White; Tight ends (TE): 84 Steve Craig; 38 Bob Tucker; 83 Stu Voigt	Offensive linemen (OL): 68 Charlie Goodrum G; 61 Wes Hamilton G; 51 Jim Hough G/C; 76 Bob Lingenfelter T; 74 Frank Myers T; 67 Dennis Swilley C/G; 53 Mick Tingelhoff C; 73 Ron Yary T; Defensive linemen (DL): 81 Carl Eller DE; 75 Randy Holloway DE; 70 Jim Marshall DE; 77 Mark Mullaney DE; 79 Lyman Smith DT; 69 Doug Sutherland DT; 72 James White DE	Linebackers (LB): 59 Matt Blair OLB; 58 Wally Hilgenberg OLB; 54 Fred McNeill OLB; 50 Jeff Siemon MLB; 55 Scott Studwell MLB; Defensive backs (DB): 25 Nate Allen CB; 20 Bobby Bryant CB; 45 Tommy Hannon SS; 22 Paul Krause FS; 27 John Turner CB; 29 Phil Wise SS; 43 Nate Wright CB; Special teams (ST): 8 Greg Coleman P; 7 Rick Danmeier K	Reserve: 78 Steve Riley T (IR); -- Whip Walton LB (IR); 23 Jeff Wright S (IR); Rookies in italics

== Preseason ==
Week	Date	Opponent	Result	Record	Venue	Attendance
1	August 5	Washington Redskins	W 20–13	1–0	Metropolitan Stadium	46,212
2	August 12	at Kansas City Chiefs	L 13–17	1–1	Arrowhead Stadium	41,092
3	August 18	at Miami Dolphins	L 22–30	1–2	Miami Orange Bowl	46,316
4	August 26	Buffalo Bills	W 30–27	2–2	Metropolitan Stadium	45,062

== Regular season ==
Week	Date	Opponent	Result	Record	Venue	Attendance
1	September 3	at New Orleans Saints	L 24–31	0–1	Superdome	54,187
2	September 11	Denver Broncos	W 12–9	1–1	Metropolitan Stadium	46,508
3	September 17	Tampa Bay Buccaneers	L 10–16	1–2	Metropolitan Stadium	46,152
4	September 25	at Chicago Bears	W 24–20	2–2	Soldier Field	53,551
5	October 1	at Tampa Bay Buccaneers	W 24–7	3–2	Tampa Stadium	65,972
6	October 8	at Seattle Seahawks	L 28–29	3–3	Kingdome	62,031
7	October 15	Los Angeles Rams	L 17–34	3–4	Metropolitan Stadium	46,551
8	October 22	Green Bay Packers	W 21–7	4–4	Metropolitan Stadium	47,411
9	October 26	at Dallas Cowboys	W 21–10	5–4	Texas Stadium	61,848
10	November 5	Detroit Lions	W 17–7	6–4	Metropolitan Stadium	46,008
11	November 12	Chicago Bears	W 17–14	7–4	Metropolitan Stadium	43,286
12	November 19	San Diego Chargers	L 7–13	7–5	Metropolitan Stadium	38,859
13	November 26	at Green Bay Packers	T 10–10 (OT)	7–5–1	Lambeau Field	51,737
14	December 3	Philadelphia Eagles	W 28–27	8–5–1	Metropolitan Stadium	38,722
15	December 9	at Detroit Lions	L 14–45	8–6–1	Silverdome	78,685
16	December 17	at Oakland Raiders	L 20–27	8–7–1	Oakland Coliseum	44,643

=== Game summaries ===
==== Week 8: vs Green Bay Packers ====
Week 8: Green Bay Packers at Minnesota Vikings – Game summary

Quarter	1	2	3	4	Total
Packers	0	7	0	0	7
Vikings	0	14	0	7	21

at Metropolitan Stadium, Bloomington, Minnesota

- Date: October 22
- Game time: 2:00 p.m. CDT
- Game weather: 51 °F (11 °C)
- TV announcers (CBS): Lindsey Nelson and Paul Hornung
- Pro-Football-Reference.com

Game information

First quarter

- No scoring plays.

Second quarter

- MIN – Chuck Foreman 16-yard pass from Fran Tarkenton (Rick Danmeier kick). Vikings 7–0.
- GB – Terdell Middleton 3-yard run (Chester Marcol kick). Tied 7–7.
- MIN – Ahmad Rashad 4-yard pass from Fran Tarkenton (Rick Danmeier kick). Vikings 14–7.

Third quarter

- No scoring plays.

Fourth quarter

- MIN – Ahmad Rashad 15-yard pass from Fran Tarkenton (Rick Danmeier kick). Vikings 21–7.

Top passers

- GB – David Whitehurst – 18/30, 120 yards, INT
- MIN – Fran Tarkenton – 26/43, 262 yards, 3 TD

Top rushers

- GB – Terdell Middleton – 15 rushes, 81 yards, TD
- MIN – Chuck Foreman – 24 rushes, 46 yards

Top receivers

- GB – Barty Smith – 6 receptions, 54 yards
- MIN – Rickey Young – 7 receptions, 73 yards

The Vikings won a game they had to win in their bid to win a 10th NFC Central division title in 11 seasons, as Fran Tarkenton completed 26 of 43 passes for 262 yards and three touchdowns, two of them to Ahmad Rashad. "That's pretty amazing for a guy who can't throw a football anymore, isn't it?" said the 38-year-old Tarkenton, who raised his 18-year yardage total to 45,143, the first man to surpass 45,000 yards. Tarkenton's third scoring strike to running back Chuck Foreman just before the half went for 16 yards. Terdell Middleton, who entered the game as the NFC's third leading rusher, scored Green Bay's only touchdown on a 3-yard run midway through the second quarter, giving Green Bay a 7–7 tie. He finished the game with 81 yards on 15 carries.

== Standings ==
NFC Central
	W	L	T	PCT	DIV	CONF	PF	PA	STK
Minnesota Vikings^{(3)}	8	7	1	.531	5–2–1	7–4–1	294	306	L2
Green Bay Packers	8	7	1	.531	5–2–1	6–5–1	249	269	L2
Detroit Lions	7	9	0	.438	4–4	5–7	290	300	W2
Chicago Bears	7	9	0	.438	3–5	7–5	253	274	W2
Tampa Bay Buccaneers	5	11	0	.313	2–6	3–11	241	259	L4

== Playoffs ==
Week	Date	Opponent (seed)	Result	Record	Venue	Attendance
Divisional	December 31	at Los Angeles Rams	L 10–34	0–1	Los Angeles Memorial Coliseum	69,631

In 2004, Football Outsiders named the 1978 Vikings as one of the "worst playoff teams ever".

== Awards and records ==
- QB Fran Tarkenton threw 32 interceptions on the season, surpassing his own franchise record of 25 (set in 1962)
- RB Rickey Young led the league with 88 receptions, setting a Vikings single-season record.

== Statistical leaders ==
Category	Player(s)	Value
Passing yards	Fran Tarkenton	3,468
Passing touchdowns	Fran Tarkenton	25
Rushing yards	Chuck Foreman	749
Rushing touchdowns	Chuck Foreman	5
Receiving yards	Ahmad Rashad	769
Receiving touchdowns	Sammy White	9
Points	Rick Danmeier	72
Kickoff return yards	Kevin Miller	854
Punt return yards	Kevin Miller	239
Interceptions	Bobby Bryant	7

=== League rankings ===
Category	Total yards	Yards per game	NFL rank (out of 28)
Passing offense	3,243	202.7	2nd
Rushing offense	1,536	96.0	28th
Total offense	4,779	298.7	17th
Passing defense	2,690	168.1	19th
Rushing defense	2,116	132.3	10th
Total defense	4,806	300.4	14th
