= 1978 Detroit Lions season =

NFL team season

- Owner: William Clay Ford Sr.
- General manager: Russ Thomas
- Head coach: Monte Clark
- Home stadium: Pontiac Silverdome

Results
- Record: 7–9
- Division place: 3rd NFC Central
- Playoffs: Did not qualify
- All-Pros: 1: DE Al Baker
- Pro Bowlers: 3: TE David Hill; DT Doug English; DE Al Baker

The 1978 Detroit Lions season was the franchise's 49th season in the National Football League. Under new head coach and former NFL player Monte Clark, the Lions continue to struggle with mediocrity finishing in third place again with a less than stellar record of 7–9.

This season would also be the swan song for starting quarterback Greg Landry's stellar ten-year career in Detroit, as in the offseason Landry was shipped to the Baltimore Colts for a 1979 fourth round pick (#88—Ulysses Norris), a 1979 fifth round pick (#131—Walt Brown), and a 1980 third round pick (#62—Mike Friede), in a rebuilding process begun by head coach Monte Clark.

== Offseason ==
=== NFL draft ===
1978 Detroit Lions draft
Round	Pick	Player	Position	College	Notes
1	11	Luther Bradley	CB	Notre Dame	
2	40	Al Baker *	DE	Colorado State	
4	94	Bill Fifer	OT	West Texas State	
4	107	Homer Elias	G	Tennessee State	from Baltimore
4	109	Larry Tearry	C	Wake Forest	from Denver
5	121	Amos Fowler	G	Southern Mississippi	
5	123	Dan Gray	DE	Rutgers	from San Diego
6	150	Dwight Hicks *	S	Michigan	
6	153	Tony Ardizzone	C	Northwestern	
6	165	Jesse Thompson	WR	California	from Denver
7	177	Bruce Gibson	RB	Pacific	
8	206	Jim Breech	K	California	
10	262	Fred Arrington	LB	Purdue	
11	289	Richard Murray	DT	Oklahoma	
12	318	Mark Patterson	DB	Washington State	
Made roster * Made at least one Pro Bowl during career

Notes

- Detroit traded its third-round pick (67th) and seventh-round pick in 1979 to Cleveland in exchange for the rights to K Tom Skladany.
- Detroit traded DT Herb Orvis to Baltimore in exchange for the Colts' fourth-round pick (107th).
- Detroit traded P Herman Weaver to Denver in exchange for the Broncos' fourth- and sixth-round picks (109th and 165th).
- Detroit traded LB Jim Laslavic to San Diego in exchange for the Chargers' fifth- and sixth-round picks (123rd and 153rd).
- Detroit traded its ninth-round pick (233rd) to San Francisco in exchange for K Steve Mike-Mayer.

=== Undrafted free agents ===
1978 undrafted free agents of note
Player	Position	College
Bob Bratkowski	Wide receiver	Washington State
Ken Callicutt	Running back	Clemson
Tim Cunningham	Running back	Long Beach State
Tom McLaughlin	Quarterback	Iowa

== Personnel ==
=== Staff / Coaches ===
1978 Detroit Lions staff
Front office: President – William Clay Ford Sr.; Executive Vice President and General Manager – Russ Thomas; Director of Football Operations – Monte Clark; Administrative Assistant – Doug Gerhart; Head coaches: Head Coach – Monte Clark; Offensive coaches: Quarterbacks and Receivers – Bob Schnelker; Offensive Backfield – Jimmy Raye; Offensive Line – Fred Hoaglin	Defensive coaches: Defensive Line – Floyd Reese; Linebackers – Marty Schottenheimer; Defensive Backfield – Billy Atkins; Special teams coaches: Special Teams – Don Doll

=== Roster ===
1978 Detroit Lions roster
Quarterbacks (QB): 16 Gary Danielson; 11 Greg Landry; 14 Joe Reed; Running backs (RB): 24 Dexter Bussey; 31 Ken Callicutt; 38 Lawrence Gaines; 32 Rick Kane; 25 Horace King; Wide receivers (WR): 89 Luther Blue; 86 Willie McGee; 87 Freddie Scott; 39 Leonard Thompson; Tight ends (TE): 83 William Gay; 81 David Hill	Offensive linemen (OL): 76 Karl Baldischwiler T; 60 Lynn Boden G; 66 Karl Chandler C; 61 Homer Elias G; 65 Amos Fowler G; 67 Donnie Green T; 63 Donnie Hickman G; 74 Brad Oates T; 53 John Sokolosky C; 54 Larry Tearry C; Defensive linemen (DL): 60 Al Baker DE; 72 Bill Cooke DE; 78 Doug English DT; 64 Dan Gray DT; 75 Dave Pureifory DE; 77 John Woodcock DT	Linebackers (LB): 58 Tony Daykin OLB; 57 Dan Dickel MLB; 55 Ed O'Neil MLB; 50 Paul Naumoff OLB; 52 Dave Washington OLB; 59 Charlie Weaver OLB; Defensive backs (DB): 40 Jimmy Allen FS; 27 Luther Bradley CB; 29 Mike Burns SS; 28 James Hunter CB; 26 Tony Leonard CB; 33 Bruce Rhodes SS; 21 Walt Williams CB; Special teams (ST): 1 Benny Ricardo K; 15 Tom Skladany P	Reserve: 73 Russ Bolinger G (IR); 43 Andy Bolton RB (IR); -- Howard Fest T (IR); 71 Dave Gallagher DT (IR); -- J. D. Hill WR (IR); 23 Levi Johnson S (IR); -- Ken Long G (Ret.); 68 Mark Markovich G (IR); 82 Ken Sanders DE (IR); 79 Dave Simonson T (IR); 47 Nat Terry CB (IR); 84 Jesse Thompson WR (IR); -- Jim Yarbrough T (IR); Rookies in italics 45 active, 13 reserve, 0 practice squad

== Regular season ==
=== Schedule ===
Week	Date	Opponent	Result	Record	Venue	Attendance
1	September 3	**Green Bay Packers**	**L** 7–13	0–1	Pontiac Silverdome	51,187
2	September 9	at **Tampa Bay Buccaneers**	**W** 15–7	1–1	Tampa Stadium	64,445
3	September 17	**Chicago Bears**	**L** 0–19	1–2	Pontiac Silverdome	65,982
4	September 24	at Seattle Seahawks	**L** 16–28	1–3	Kingdome	60,040
5	October 1	at **Green Bay Packers**	**L** 14–35	1–4	Milwaukee County Stadium	54,601
6	October 8	Washington Redskins	**L** 19–21	1–5	Pontiac Silverdome	60,555
7	October 15	at Atlanta Falcons	**L** 0–14	1–6	Atlanta–Fulton County Stadium	51,172
8	October 22	San Diego Chargers	**W** 31–14	2–6	Pontiac Silverdome	54,031
9	October 29	at **Chicago Bears**	**W** 21–17	3–6	Soldier Field	53,378
10	November 5	at **Minnesota Vikings**	**L** 7–17	3–7	Metropolitan Stadium	46,008
11	November 12	**Tampa Bay Buccaneers**	**W** 34–23	4–7	Pontiac Silverdome	60,320
12	November 19	at Oakland Raiders	**L** 17–29	4–8	Oakland–Alameda County Coliseum	44,517
13	November 23	Denver Broncos	**W** 17–14	5–8	Pontiac Silverdome	71,785
14	December 3	at St. Louis Cardinals	**L** 14–21	5–9	Busch Memorial Stadium	39,200
15	December 9	**Minnesota Vikings**	**W** 45–14	6–9	Pontiac Silverdome	78,685
16	December 17	San Francisco 49ers	**W** 33–14	7–9	Pontiac Silverdome	56,674
Note: Intra-division games are in **bold** text

=== Game summaries ===
==== Week 9: at Chicago Bears ====
Team	1	2	3	4	Total
• **Lions**	7	14	0	0	21
Bears	3	7	7	0	17

- Date: October 29
- Location: Soldier Field, Chicago
- Game start: 1:00 p.m. CST
- Game weather: 48 °F or 8.9 °C, wind 10 miles per hour (16 km/h; 8.7 kn)
- TV announcers (CBS): Tim Ryan, Johnny Morris and sideline reporter Bill Mazer
- Source: Pro-Football-Reference.com

Scoring summary
1	Lions	Horace King 1 yard run (Benny Ricardo kick)	Lions 7–0
1	Bears	Bob Thomas 28 yard field goal	Lions 7–3
2	Lions	Jesse Thompson 8 yard pass from Gary Danielson (Benny Ricardo kick)	Lions 14–3
2	Bears	Bob Avellini 9 yard run (Bob Thomas kick)	Lions 14–10
2	Lions	David Hill 2 yard pass from Gary Danielson (Benny Ricardo kick)	Lions 21–10
3	Bears	Roland Harper 2 yard run (Bob Thomas kick)	Lions 21–17

=== Standings ===
NFC Central
	W	L	T	PCT	DIV	CONF	PF	PA	STK
Minnesota Vikings^{(3)}	8	7	1	.531	5–2–1	7–4–1	294	306	L2
Green Bay Packers	8	7	1	.531	5–2–1	6–5–1	249	269	L2
Detroit Lions	7	9	0	.438	4–4	5–7	290	300	W2
Chicago Bears	7	9	0	.438	3–5	7–5	253	274	W2
Tampa Bay Buccaneers	5	11	0	.313	2–6	3–11	241	259	L4
