= David Petway =

American football player (born 1955)

No. 47
- Position: Defensive back

Personal information
- Born: October 17, 1955 (age 71); Chicago, Illinois, U.S.
- Listed height: 6 ft 1 in (1.85 m)
- Listed weight: 207 lb (94 kg)

Career information
- High school: Lake View (Chicago)
- College: Northern Illinois (1977–1980)
- NFL draft: 1981: undrafted

Career history
- Green Bay Packers (1981)

Career NFL statistics
- Games played: 6
- Stats at Pro Football Reference

David Lawrence Petway (born October 17, 1955) is an American former professional football player who was a defensive back for the Green Bay Packers of the National Football League (NFL). He played college football for the Northern Illinois Huskies.

== Early life and college ==
Petway was born on October 17, 1955, in Chicago, Illinois, where he graduated from Lake View High School. After high school, he attended Northern Illinois University (NIU) where he played for their football team. He became a starter at safety as a freshman. That season, he returned an interception 100 yards for a touchdown in a game against Southern Illinois University, which was only the second time in Mid-American Conference (MAC) history this was accomplished and tied an NCAA record. He helped NIU have the third best pass defense in the nation on the year.

Petway remained a starter in 1978 and despite being limited by a leg injury, was able to compile 34 solo tackles and 10 assisted tackles. Petway, who majored in finance and attended the NIU College of Business, was named to the All-MAC Academic team at the end of year, having a grade-point average (GPA) of 3.1. He switched from strong safety to free safety prior to the 1979 season. He was named in 1979 as among the three players giving NIU "one of the best secondaries in the MAC" and received another selection to the MAC All-Academic team. As a senior in 1980, Petway was selected as the team's "Outstanding Defensive Back", was chosen as one of two Huskies for first-team All-MAC, and was named by Associated Press an honorable mention All-American. He additionally received selections to the All-MAC Academic and All-District Four Academic teams, being the first three-time All-Academic selection in school history. He finished his collegiate career in the top-20 in school history in tackles and later was named one of the 10 players for the "All-Time Huskie Stadium team" in 1995.

== Professional career ==
Petway went undrafted in the 1981 NFL draft, but was signed as an undrafted free agent by the Packers. Prior to the start of the 1981 NFL season, Petway was released by the Packers. However, after a late season injury to safety Johnny Gray, Petway was brought back and played six games for the team. Prior to the next season, the Packers released him. After his NFL career, Petway had a try-out for the Chicago Blitz of the United States Football League (USFL).
