= Rickey Anderson =

American football player (born 1953)

No. 43
- Position: Running back

Personal information
- Born: May 21, 1953 (age 73); Kingsland, Georgia, U.S.
- Listed height: 6 ft 1 in (1.85 m)
- Listed weight: 211 lb (96 kg)

Career information
- College: South Carolina State
- NFL draft: 1978: 3rd round, 71st overall pick

Career history
- San Diego Chargers (1978)

Career NFL statistics
- Rushing yards: 11
- Average: 3.7
- Receptions: 1
- Stats at Pro Football Reference

Rickey Recardo Anderson (born May 21, 1953) is an American former professional football player who was a running back for the National Football League (NFL)'s San Diego Chargers in 1978. After playing in college football with South Carolina State University, he was selected by the Chargers in the third round of the 1978 NFL draft. Anderson had three rushing attempts for eleven yards in the 1978 season, his only year in the NFL.
