= Harry Washington (American football) =

American football player (born 1956)

No. 80, 81
- Position: Wide receiver

Personal information
- Born: July 30, 1956 (age 70); Tacoma, Washington, U.S.
- Listed height: 6 ft 0 in (1.83 m)
- Listed weight: 180 lb (82 kg)

Career information
- High school: Henry Foss (Tacoma)
- College: Colorado State
- NFL draft: 1978: undrafted

Career history
- Minnesota Vikings (1978); Chicago Bears (1979)

Career NFL statistics
- Receptions: 1
- Receiving yards: 24
- Stats at Pro Football Reference

Harry Washington (born July 30, 1956) is an American former professional football player who was a wide receiver for the Minnesota Vikings and the Chicago Bears of the National Football League (NFL). He played college football for the Colorado State Rams.

Washington was also a noted minor league player.
