= Melvin Jackson (American football) =

American football player (born 1954)

No. 71
- Position: Guard

Personal information
- Born: May 5, 1954 (age 72); Los Angeles, California, U.S.
- Listed height: 6 ft 1 in (1.85 m)
- Listed weight: 267 lb (121 kg)

Career information
- High school: Mount Carmel (Los Angeles)
- College: USC
- NFL draft: 1976: 12th round, 328th overall pick

Career history
- Green Bay Packers (1976–1980)

Awards and highlights
- National champion (1974)

Career NFL statistics
- Games played: 64
- Games started: 34
- Stats at Pro Football Reference

Melvin Jackson Jr. (born May 5, 1954) is an American former professional football player who was a guard in the National Football League (NFL). He played college football for the USC Trojans.

== Biography ==
Jackson was born on May 5, 1954, in Los Angeles, California. He is the grandfather of Miami Dolphins tackle Austin Jackson.

== Professional career ==
Jackson was selected by the Green Bay Packers in the twelfth round of the 1976 NFL draft with the 328th overall pick. He played five seasons with the team. Jackson played at the collegiate level at the University of Southern California.
