= Ron Cassidy =

American football player (born 1957)

No. 88
- Position: Wide receiver

Personal information
- Born: July 23, 1957 (age 69); Ventura, California, U.S.
- Listed height: 6 ft 0 in (1.83 m)
- Listed weight: 184 lb (83 kg)

Career information
- High school: Los Alamitos (Los Alamitos, California)
- College: Utah State
- NFL draft: 1979: 8th round, 193rd overall pick

Career history
- Green Bay Packers (1979–1981, 1983–1984)

Career NFL statistics
- Receptions: 14
- Receiving yards: 233
- Stats at Pro Football Reference

Ron Cassidy (born July 23, 1957) is an American former professional football player who was a wide receiver for the Green Bay Packers of the National Football League (NFL). He played college football for the Utah State Aggies and was selected by the Packers in the eighth round of the 1979 NFL draft. Cassidy played in 60 games for Green Bay from 1979 to 1981 and 1983 to 1984, catching 14 passes for 233 yards.
