= Walt Landers =

American football player (born 1953)

No. 42
- Position: Running back

Personal information
- Born: July 4, 1953 (age 73); Lanett, Alabama, U.S
- Listed height: 6 ft 0 in (1.83 m)
- Listed weight: 214 lb (97 kg)

Career information
- College: Clark Atlanta
- NFL draft: 1978: undrafted

Career history
- Green Bay Packers (1978–1979)

Career NFL statistics
- Rushing yards: 81
- Rushing average: 3.4
- Total touchdowns: 2
- Stats at Pro Football Reference

Walter James Landers (born July 4, 1953, Alabama, U.S.) is an American former professional football player in the National Football League (NFL). Landers was born on July 4, 1953, in Lanett, Alabama, and attended Clark Atlanta University.

Landers went undrafted in the 1978 NFL draft; he signed as a running back with the Green Bay Packers and played four games in the 1978 NFL season. His season ended though after injuring his knee in a game against San Diego. After being on injured reserve, Landers was waived by the Packers at the beginning of the 1979 NFL season before being resigned. He played in nine games that season, starting one. The Packers cut Landers from the team prior to the start of the 1980 NFL season. In total, Landers played 13 games over two seasons for the Packers, accumulating 141 total yards and 1 touchdown.
