= John Thompson (tight end) =

American football player (born 1957)

No. 83, 87
- Position: Tight end

Personal information
- Born: January 18, 1957 (age 69); Jackson, Mississippi, U.S.
- Listed height: 6 ft 3 in (1.91 m)
- Listed weight: 228 lb (103 kg)

Career information
- High school: Oakland (CA) Skyline
- College: Weber State, Utah State
- NFL draft: 1979: 9th round, 235th overall pick

Career history
- Green Bay Packers (1979–1982); Los Angeles Rams (1983)*; Oakland Invaders (1984)
- * Offseason or practice squad member only

Career NFL statistics
- Receptions: 2
- Receiving yards: 24
- Touchdowns: 2
- Stats at Pro Football Reference

John Washington Thompson Jr. (born January 18, 1957) is an American former professional football player who was a tight end in the National Football League (NFL). Thompson was selected by the Green Bay Packers in the ninth round of the 1979 NFL draft and played four seasons with the team.
