= Terry Jones (defensive tackle) =

American football player (born 1956)

No. 63
- Position: Defensive tackle

Personal information
- Born: November 8, 1956 (age 69); Sandersville, Georgia, U.S.
- Listed height: 6 ft 2 in (1.88 m)
- Listed weight: 259 lb (117 kg)

Career information
- High school: Washington County (Sandersville)
- College: Alabama
- NFL draft: 1978: 11th round, 248th overall pick

Career history
- Green Bay Packers (1978–1984)

Career NFL statistics
- Sacks: 14
- Fumble recoveries: 5
- Stats at Pro Football Reference

Terry Wayne Jones (born November 8, 1956) is an American former professional football player who was a defensive tackle in the National Football League (NFL). He played his college football for the Alabama Crimson Tide under coach Bear Bryant. He played his entire career from 1978 to 1984 for the Green Bay Packers. His son, also called Terry Jones, played tight end in the NFL for the Baltimore Ravens and San Francisco 49ers.

He was Senior Associate Strength and Conditioning Coach (Rehab) for the Crimson Tide football team until his retirement June 1, 2022.
