= Tim Stokes =

American football player (born 1950)

No. 78, 76, 74
- Position: Tackle

Personal information
- Born: March 16, 1950 (age 76); Oakland, California, U.S.
- Listed height: 6 ft 5 in (1.96 m)
- Listed weight: 252 lb (114 kg)

Career information
- High school: San Leandro (San Leandro, California)
- College: Oregon
- NFL draft: 1973: 3rd round, 60th overall pick

Career history
- Los Angeles Rams (1974); Washington Redskins (1975–1977); Green Bay Packers (1978–1981); New York Giants (1981); Green Bay Packers (1982)

Awards and highlights
- Second-team All-Pac-8 (1972)

Career NFL statistics
- Games played: 105
- Games started: 74
- Stats at Pro Football Reference

Timothy Paul Stokes (born March 16, 1950) is an American former professional football player who was an offensive lineman in the National Football League (NFL) for the Los Angeles Rams, Washington Redskins, Green Bay Packers, and New York Giants. He played college football for the Oregon Ducks and was selected in the third round of the 1973 NFL draft.
