= Mike Hunt (American football) =

American football player (born 1956)

No. 55
- Position: Linebacker

Personal information
- Born: October 6, 1956 (age 70); Madison, Minnesota, U.S.
- Listed height: 6 ft 2 in (1.88 m)
- Listed weight: 240 lb (109 kg)

Career information
- High school: Ortonville (MN)
- College: Minnesota
- NFL draft: 1978: 2nd round, 34th overall pick

Career history
- Green Bay Packers (1978–1980)

Career NFL statistics
- Interceptions: 2
- Fumble recoveries: 1
- Sacks: 1
- Stats at Pro Football Reference

Michael Anthony Hunt (born October 6, 1956) is an American former professional football player who was a linebacker for three seasons for the Green Bay Packers of the National Football League. He played college football for the Minnesota Golden Gophers. He played a total of 22 games for the Packers.

The Packers selected Hunt 34th overall from the University of Minnesota in the second round of the 1978 NFL draft. Hunt played all 16 games in his rookie season, but began to suffer from the effects of head and neck injuries. He appeared in only three games in 1979, when he was forced to the injured reserve list because of knee surgery, and three more in 1980. On September 21, 1980, Hunt was kneed in the head during a game against the Los Angeles Rams and suffered a concussion. As a result of these injuries, this was to be his final NFL game. After spending 1981 on the reserve-retired list, Hunt attempted a comeback in the 1982 preseason, but was forced to retire on August 3, 1982 because of recurring concussions. His name has also been synonymous with a raunchy pun.
