= Paul Rudzinski =

American football player (born 1956)

No. 66, 58, 70
- Position: Linebacker

Personal information
- Born: July 28, 1956 (age 70); Detroit, Michigan, U.S.
- Listed height: 6 ft 1 in (1.85 m)
- Listed weight: 220 lb (100 kg)

Career information
- High school: Catholic Central (Detroit)
- College: Michigan State
- NFL draft: 1978: undrafted

Career history
- Green Bay Packers (1978–1980)

Awards and highlights
- Second-team All-Big Ten (1977)

Career NFL statistics
- Games played: 33
- Interception: 1
- Interception yards: 14
- Stats at Pro Football Reference

Paul Rudzinski (born July 28, 1956) is an American former professional football player who was a linebacker for three seasons with the Green Bay Packers of the National Football League (NFL). He played college football for the Michigan State Spartans.

Rudzinski was born on July 28, 1956, in Detroit, Michigan, where he attended Detroit Catholic Central High School. Rudzinski initially desired to attend the University of Notre Dame, but ended up attending Michigan State University where he played college football. He lettered with Michigan State all four years of his college career. He received a degree in advertising.

Rudzinski went undrafted in the 1978 NFL draft. He signed as an undrafted free agent with the Green Bay Packers. From 1978 to 1980, Rudzinski played as a linebacker in 33 games for the Packers, recording one interception. During his time with the Packers, Rudzinski was released and signed back on the team four times. He was released for the last time in August 1981 and did not play football again. During his playing career, he worked in the offseason for a cheese marketing company.
