= 1979 Pro Bowl =

National Football League all-star game

1979 NFL Pro Bowl
AFC	NFC
7	13
Head coach: Chuck Fairbanks (New England Patriots)	Head coach: Bud Grant (Minnesota Vikings)
	1	2	3	4	Total
AFC	0	7	0	0	7
NFC	0	6	7	0	13
- Date: January 29, 1979
- Stadium: Los Angeles Memorial Coliseum; Los Angeles, California
- MVP: Ahmad Rashad (Minnesota Vikings)
- Referee: Jerry Markbreit
- Attendance: 38,333

TV in the United States
- Network: ABC
- Announcers: Frank Gifford, Howard Cosell and Don Meredith

The 1979 Pro Bowl was the NFL's 29th annual all-star game which featured the outstanding performers from the 1978 season. The game was played on Monday, January 29, 1979, at Los Angeles Memorial Coliseum in Los Angeles, California before a crowd of 38,333. The final score was NFC 13, AFC 7.

Chuck Fairbanks of the New England Patriots lead the AFC team against an NFC team coached by Minnesota Vikings head coach Bud Grant. The referee was Jerry Markbreit in his second year as a referee.

Ahmad Rashad of the Minnesota Vikings was named the game's Most Valuable Player. Players on the winning NFC team received $5,000 apiece while the AFC participants each took home $2,500.

As of 2019, this was the last Pro Bowl to be played on a Monday, and the last one to be played in Los Angeles. It was the last one to be played outside Hawaii until the 2010 Pro Bowl which was in Miami Gardens, Florida.

This was also the first Pro Bowl to have players sport their respective team helmets, a custom that still stands today.

== Rosters ==
=== AFC ===
1979 AFC Pro Bowl roster
Quarterbacks: 12 Terry Bradshaw (PIT); 13 Dan Fouts (SD); Running backs: 20 Joe Washington (BAL) HB / KR; 34 Earl Campbell (HOU) FB; 32 Franco Harris (PIT) FB; 43 Mike Pruitt (CLE) FB; Wide receivers: 80 Rick Upchurch (DEN) KR / PR; 81 Steve Largent (SEA) KR; 18 Charlie Joiner (SD); 82 John Stallworth (PIT); 83 John Jefferson (SD); 84 Stanley Morgan (NE); Tight ends: 88 Raymond Chester (OAK); 87 Dave Casper (OAK)	Offensive linemen: 67 Ed White (SD) G; 71 Leon Gray (NE) G / T; 73 John Hannah (NE) G; 70 Russ Washington (SD) T / G; 52 Mike Webster (PIT) C; 54 Tom DeLeone (CLE) C; 79 Marvin Powell (NYJ) T; 64 Joe Delamielleure (BUF) G; Defensive linemen: 68 L. C. Greenwood (PIT) DE; 75 Joe Greene (PIT) DE; 71 Fred Dean (SD) DE; 72 Gary Johnson (SD) DE; 65 Elvin Bethea (HOU) DT; 74 Louie Kelcher (SD) DT; 72 Bob Baumhower (MIA) NG / DT	Linebackers: 53 Randy Gradishar (DEN) ILB / MLB; 58 Jack Lambert (PIT) MLB; 57 Tom Jackson (DEN) OLB; 52 Robert Brazile (HOU) OLB; 59 Jack Ham (PIT) ILB; 56 Kim Bokamper (MIA) ILB; Defensive backs: 20 Louis Wright (DEN) CB; 27 Mike Reinfeldt (HOU) FS; 22 Mike Haynes (NE) CB; 47 Mel Blount (PIT) CB; 43 Tim Foley (MIA) SS; 31 Donnie Shell (PIT) FS; Special teams: 1 Bob Grupp (KC) P; 15 Toni Fritsch (HOU) K

Rookies in Italics

=== NFC ===
1979 NFC Pro Bowl roster
Quarterbacks: 12 Roger Staubach (DAL); 8 Archie Manning (NO); Running backs: 31 Wilbert Montgomery (PHI) HB / PR; 32 Ottis Anderson (STL); 42 Chuck Muncie (NO) RB / KR; 34 Walter Payton (CHI) HB; Wide receivers: 17 Harold Carmichael (PHI) WR / FL / TE; 89 Wes Chandler (NO); 88 Wally Henry (NO) WR / KR; 28 Ahmad Rashad (MIN); 82 Tony Hill (DAL); Tight ends: 85 Henry Childs (NO); 81 David Hill (DET)	Offensive linemen: 67 Pat Donovan (DAL) T; 68 Herbert Scott (DAL) G; 76 Jerry Sisemore (PHI) T; 75 Stan Walters (PHI) T; 60 Dennis Harrah (RAM) T/G; 61 Rich Saul (RAM) C; 64 Bob Young (STL) G / DL; 72 Dan Dierdorf (STL) T; Defensive linemen: 85 Jack Youngblood (RAM) DE; 79 Harvey Martin (DAL) DE; 54 Randy White (DAL) DT; 90 Larry Brooks (RAM) DT; 63 Lee Roy Selmon (TB) DE / DT; 60 Al Baker (DET) DE; 65 Charlie Johnson (PHI) DT	Linebackers: 10 Brad Van Pelt (NYG) ILB; 51 Jim Youngblood (RAM) MLB; 59 Matt Blair (MIN) ILB; 52 Bob Breunig (DAL) MLB; 53 Harry Carson (NYG) ILB / MLB; Defensive backs: 37 Tom Myers (NO) S; 22 Roger Wehrli (STL) CB; 29 Ken Houston (WAS) CB / S; 43 Cliff Harris (DAL) FS; 20 Joe Lavender (WAS) CB; 49 Rod Perry (RAM) SS; Special teams: 13 Dave Jennings (NYG) P; 3 Mark Moseley (WAS) K

Rookies in Italics
