= Estus Hood =

American football player (born 1955)

No. 38
- Positions: Cornerback, safety

Personal information
- Born: November 14, 1955 (age 70); Hattiesburg, Mississippi, U.S.
- Listed height: 5 ft 11 in (1.80 m)
- Listed weight: 183 lb (83 kg)

Career information
- High school: Eastridge (Kankakee, Illinois)
- College: Illinois State
- NFL draft: 1978: 3rd round, 62nd overall pick

Career history
- Green Bay Packers (1978–1984)

Career NFL statistics
- Interceptions: 11
- Fumble recoveries: 2
- Touchdowns: 1
- Stats at Pro Football Reference

Estus Hood III (born November 14, 1955) is an American former professional football player who was a cornerback for the Green Bay Packers of the National Football League (NFL). He played college football for the Illinois State Redbirds.
