= Mark Koncar =

American football player (born 1953)

No. 79, 72
- Position: Offensive tackle

Personal information
- Born: May 5, 1953 (age 73); Murray, Utah, U.S.
- Listed height: 6 ft 5 in (1.96 m)
- Listed weight: 271 lb (123 kg)

Career information
- High school: Murray
- College: Colorado
- NFL draft: 1976: 1st round, 23rd overall pick

Career history
- Green Bay Packers (1976–1981); Houston Oilers (1982)

Awards and highlights
- PFWA All-Rookie Team (1976); First-team All-American (1975); First-team All-Big Eight (1975)

Career NFL statistics
- Games played: 58
- Games started: 52
- Stats at Pro Football Reference

Mark K. Koncar (born May 5, 1953) is an American former professional football player who was an offensive tackle in the National Football League (NFL). He is a graduate of Murray High School in Murray, Utah. After graduating from high school Koncar attended the University of Colorado Boulder. Koncar was selected 23rd overall in the first round by the Green Bay Packers in the 1976 NFL draft, playing for five seasons (1976, 1977, 1979, 1980, 1981) before playing for the Houston Oilers in 1982. He suffered a number of injuries during his career, and missed the 1978 NFL season. After playing for the Oilers, he retired in July 1983.
