= David Whitehurst =

American football player (born 1955)

No. 17
- Position: Quarterback

Personal information
- Born: April 27, 1955 (age 71); Baumholder, West Germany
- Listed height: 6 ft 2 in (1.88 m)
- Listed weight: 204 lb (93 kg)

Career information
- High school: Walker (Atlanta, Georgia, U.S.)
- College: Furman (1973–1976)
- NFL draft: 1977: 8th round, 206th overall pick

Career history
- Green Bay Packers (1977–1983); Kansas City Chiefs (1984)

Career NFL statistics
- Passing attempts: 980
- Passing completions: 504
- Completion percentage: 51.4%
- TD–INT: 28–51
- Passing yards: 6,205
- Passer rating: 59.2
- Rushing yards: 242
- Rushing touchdowns: 7
- Stats at Pro Football Reference

Charles David Whitehurst (born April 27, 1955) is a former professional American football quarterback in the National Football League (NFL). He was drafted by the Green Bay Packers in the 8th round of the 1977 NFL draft. He played college football at Furman.

== Career ==
Whitehurst graduated from Walker High School in DeKalb County, Georgia in 1973 where he played both football and baseball.

He played seven seasons with the Packers from 1977 to 1983. He also played for the Kansas City Chiefs in 1984 but saw no action.

David Whitehurst was the second quarterback in NFL history from Furman, a small Liberal Arts college. The first had been Sam Wyche. Whitehurst, born in West Germany but raised in Atlanta, Georgia, grew up a Packers fan and wore the number 15 at Furman in honor of his favorite player, Packers quarterback Bart Starr. Knowing that for obvious reasons, he couldn't wear number 15 for Green Bay, Whitehurst switched to 17. He made the team as a rookie in 1977 and served as the back-up to Lynn Dickey. However, during Whitehurst's rookie season, Dickey was injured, and Whitehurst was thrust into the starting lineup. His first start would come on Monday Night Football, a nationally televised game against the Washington Redskins. In that game, Whitehurst went 12 for 24 with 3 interceptions versus zero touchdown passes. The Redskins won 10–9.

In 1978, Whitehurst found himself the starter, as Dickey was out for the season with a broken leg. Behind the running of rookie Terdell Middleton, the Packers raced out to a 7–2 record. However, the Packers did not do well in the second half of the season. They finished 8-7-1 and tied with the Minnesota Vikings who ended up the division champs via a tie breaker.

In 1979, Whitehurst started 13 games for the Packers and went 4-9 during that stretch. Once again, he threw more interceptions (18) than he did touchdowns (10). He didn't start any games in 1980 and just 3 in 1981, going 2-1 during that time. In one of the best games of his career, Whitehurst completed 12 out of 23 passes for 108 yards and 2 touchdown, with zero interceptions in a 34–24 win over the Seattle Seahawks. Two weeks later, Whitehurst was the starter again, this time leading the Packers to a 21–17 win at home versus their long-time rivals, the Chicago Bears.

In his final two seasons, Whitehurst did not start a single game for the Packers. As Dickey was the unquestioned starter, and the Packers were trying to develop Rich Campbell, who they had drafted in the first round a few seasons prior from California. However, Campbell was a complete bust, never starting a single game in the NFL. At the end of the 1983 season, the Packers fired head coach Bart Starr, the Hall of Fame former quarterback and Packer legend, whose tenure as coach had been middling at best. Whitehurst was released and he then signed with the Kansas City Chiefs to be a backup to Bill Kenney and to help mentor rookie Todd Blackledge.

== Post NFL career ==
After one season in Kansas City, Whitehurst retired from professional football. Unlike most athletes who aren't sure of what they wanted to do once they were done playing, Whitehurst had retired with his mind set on what he wanted to do. As a college student, Whitehurst in the summers had worked for his father, helping to build homes. During the NFLPA strike of 1982, Whitehurst had become addicted to the show This Old House hosted by Bob Vila. Thanks to assistance from his father's business partner, Whitehurst was able to start his own company, David Whitehurst Homes.

Whitehurst admitted that he had a tough time accepting the fact that his time in the NFL wasn't what he'd hoped it to be. While he had flashes of greatness and played a role in history (such as starting for the Packers against New England in the first ever Monday Night Football Game played at Lambeau Field, a 27 - 14 Packers victory), it wasn't anything memorable. But he said as time went on, the old wounds healed, and finally he felt closure with how his career turned out.

== Personal life ==
His son Charlie played quarterback for the Clemson Tigers and professionally for five NFL teams from 2006 to 2016. His daughter Carrie played basketball for Clemson.
