= Terdell Middleton =

American football player (1955–2015)

No. 34, 39, 43
- Position: Running back

Personal information
- Born: April 8, 1955; Memphis, Tennessee, U.S.
- Died: April 3, 2015 (aged 59); Memphis, Tennessee, U.S.
- Listed height: 6 ft 0 in (1.83 m)
- Listed weight: 198 lb (90 kg)

Career information
- High school: South Side
- College: Memphis
- NFL draft: 1977: 3rd round, 80th overall pick

Career history
- Green Bay Packers (1977–1981); Tampa Bay Buccaneers (1982–1983); Memphis Showboats (1984)

Awards and highlights
- Pro Bowl (1978)

Career NFL statistics
- Rushing attempts: 561
- Rushing yards: 2,048
- Rushing touchdowns: 15
- Stats at Pro Football Reference

Terdell Middleton (April 8, 1955 – April 3, 2015) was an American professional football player who was a running back for seven seasons in the National Football League (NFL). Born in Memphis, Tennessee, he was originally a third round pick in the 1977 NFL draft by the St. Louis Cardinals, Middleton was traded to the Green Bay Packers in the preseason. He went to the Pro Bowl after the 1978 season, when he ran for 1,116 yards, sixth best in the NFL. He also played in the USFL for the Memphis Showboats in 1984.

Middleton died in Memphis on April 3, 2015, five days short of his 60th birthday.
