= 1983 Green Bay Packers season =

NFL team season

- Head coach: Bart Starr
- Home stadium: Lambeau Field; Milwaukee County Stadium

Results
- Record: 8–8
- Division place: 2nd NFC Central
- Playoffs: Did not qualify

The 1983 Green Bay Packers season was their 65th season overall and their 63rd in the National Football League. The team finished with an 8–8 record under ninth-year head coach Bart Starr to finish second in the NFC Central division. The team set an NFL record for most overtime games played in one season with five, winning two and losing three. On Monday Night Football in October, Green Bay defeated the Washington Redskins, 48–47, in what was at the time the highest-scoring game in MNF history. Redskins quarterback Joe Theisman and his counterpart Lynn Dickey threw for a combined 785 yards. Each team punted just once in the entire game. It was voted one of the ten best Packer games and is featured on the NFL Films collection, "The Green Bay Packers Greatest Games."

Green Bay hovered around the .500 mark all season. Entering their final regular season game on December 18 at Chicago, the Packers (8–7) could secure a playoff berth with a victory. Green Bay scored a touchdown to take a one-point lead with just over three minutes in the game, and Chicago running back Walter Payton was sidelined with a wrist injury. The Bears returned the kickoff to their 38 and drove fifty yards, down to the Packer twelve, with 1:17 remaining. Although Green Bay had all three of its timeouts, they opted not to use any, and the Bears kicked a winning 22-yard field goal with ten seconds on the clock. Green Bay fumbled away the ensuing kickoff, and the Los Angeles Rams (9–7) gained the final playoff slot.

Starr was fired the following day by team president Robert Parins, ending a 26-year association with the team as a player and coach. Former player Forrest Gregg, the head coach of the Cincinnati Bengals, was hired before the end of the week, announced on Christmas Eve. Gregg had led the Bengals to Super Bowl XVI two years earlier, but had less success in his four seasons in Green Bay, then left for his alma mater SMU in Dallas in January 1988.

== Offseason ==
=== NFL draft ===
1983 Green Bay Packers draft
Round	Pick	Player	Position	College	Notes
1	11	Tim Lewis	Cornerback	Pittsburgh	
2	48	Dave Drechsler	Guard	North Carolina	
4	104	Mike Miller	Wide receiver	Tennessee	
5	132	Brian Thomas	Running back	Pittsburgh	
6	160	Ron Sams	Guard	Pittsburgh	
7	188	Jessie Clark	Running back	Arkansas	
8	216	Carlton Briscoe	Running back	McNeese State	
9	243	Robin Ham	Center	West Texas State	
10	253	Byron Williams	Wide receiver	Texas–Arlington	
10	271	Jimmy Thomas	Defensive back	Indiana	
11	299	Bucky Scribner	Punter	Kansas	
12	327	John Harvey	Linebacker	USC	
Made roster

=== Undrafted free agents ===
1983 Undrafted free agents of note
Player	Position	College
Tom Bishop	Defensive end	Asland
Jim Ettari	Nose tackle	The Citadel
Joe Rudzinski	Linebacker	Notre Dame

== Personnel ==
=== Staff ===
1983 Green Bay Packers staff
Front office: President – Robert J. Parins; Corporate assistant to the president – Bob Harlan; Director of player personnel – Dick Corrick; Head coaches: Head coach – Bart Starr; Offensive coaches: Offensive coordinator – Bob Schnelker; Offensive backs – John Brunner; Receivers – Lew Carpenter; Offensive line – Ernie McMillan; Assistant offensive line – Bill Meyers	Defensive coaches: Defensive coordinator – John Meyer; Defensive line – Doc Urich; Linebackers – Monte Kiffin; Defensive backs – Ross Fichtner; Special teams coaches: Special teams – Dick Rehbein

=== Roster ===
1983 Green Bay Packers roster
Quarterbacks (QB): 19 Rich Campbell; 12 Lynn Dickey; 17 David Whitehurst; Running backs (RB): 33 Jessie Clark; 31 Gerry Ellis; 25 Harlan Huckleby; 39 Mike Meade; 20 Chet Winters; Wide receivers (WR): 88 Ron Cassidy; 85 Phil Epps; 83 John Jefferson; 80 James Lofton; Tight ends (TE): 82 Paul Coffman; 81 Gary Lewis	Offensive linemen (OL): 61 Dave Drechsler G; 77 Charlie Getty T; 65 Ron Hallstrom T; 74 Tim Huffman G; 64 Syd Kitson G; 68 Greg Koch T; 54 Larry McCarren C; 58 Larry Rubens C; 67 Karl Swanke T; Defensive linemen (DL): 72 Greg Boyd DE; 73 Byron Braggs DE; 93 Robert Brown DE; 99 Charles Johnson NT; 90 Ezra Johnson DE; 91 Daryle Skaugstad NT; 79 Ron Spears DE	Linebackers (LB): 59 John Anderson OLB; 52 George Cumby ILB; 57 Mike Curcio ILB; 53 Mike Douglass OLB; 62 Jim Laughlin ILB; 56 Cliff Lewis OLB; 51 Guy Prather OLB; 55 Randy Scott ILB; 50 Rich Wingo ILB; Defensive backs (DB): 24 Johnnie Gray SS; 38 Estus Hood CB; 21 Mike Jolly FS; 22 Mark Lee CB; 26 Tim Lewis CB; 37 Mark Murphy FS; 44 Dwayne O'Steen CB; Special teams (ST): 11 Eddie Garcia K; 13 Bucky Scribner P; 10 Jan Stenerud K	Reserve: 60 Calvin Favron LB (IR); 69 Leotis Harris G (IR); 40 Eddie Lee Ivery RB (NF-Ill.); 63 Terry Jones NT (IR); 29 Mike McCoy CB (IR); 35 Del Rodgers RB (NF-Inj.); 70 Ron Sams G (IR); 75 Richard Turner NT (IR); Rookies in italics 49 active

== Preseason ==
Week	Date	Opponent	Result	Record	Venue	Recap
1	August 6	Cleveland Browns	L 20–21	0-1	Lambeau Field	Recap
2	August 12	at Seattle Seahawks	L 21–28	0-2	Kingdome	Recap
3	August 20	at Philadelphia Eagles	L 14–27	0-3	Veterans Stadium	Recap
4	August 27	St. Louis Cardinals	W 39–27	1-3	Lambeau Field	Recap

== Regular season ==
=== Schedule ===
Week	Date	Opponent	Result	Record	Venue	Attendance	Recap
1	September 4	at Houston Oilers	**W** 41–38 (OT)	1–0	Astrodome	44,073	Recap
2	September 11	Pittsburgh Steelers	**L** 21–25	1–1	Lambeau Field	55,154	Recap
3	September 18	Los Angeles Rams	**W** 27–24	2–1	Milwaukee County Stadium	54,037	Recap
4	September 26	at New York Giants	**L** 3–27	2–2	Giants Stadium	75,308	Recap
5	October 2	**Tampa Bay Buccaneers**	**W** 55–14	3–2	Lambeau Field	54,272	Recap
6	October 9	at **Detroit Lions**	**L** 14–38	3–3	Pontiac Silverdome	67,738	Recap
7	October 17	Washington Redskins	**W** 48–47	4–3	Lambeau Field	55,255	Recap
8	October 23	**Minnesota Vikings**	**L** 17–20 (OT)	4–4	Lambeau Field	55,236	Recap
9	October 30	at Cincinnati Bengals	**L** 14–34	4–5	Riverfront Stadium	53,349	Recap
10	November 6	Cleveland Browns	**W** 35–21	5–5	Milwaukee County Stadium	54,089	Recap
11	November 13	at **Minnesota Vikings**	**W** 29–21	6–5	Hubert H. Humphrey Metrodome	60,113	Recap
12	November 20	**Detroit Lions**	**L** 20–23 (OT)	6–6	Milwaukee County Stadium	50,050	Recap
13	November 27	at Atlanta Falcons	**L** 41–47 (OT)	6–7	Atlanta–Fulton County Stadium	35,688	Recap
14	December 4	**Chicago Bears**	**W** 31–28	7–7	Lambeau Field	51,147	Recap
15	December 12	at **Tampa Bay Buccaneers**	**W** 12–9 (OT)	8–7	Tampa Stadium	50,763	Recap
16	December 18	at **Chicago Bears**	**L** 21–23	8–8	Soldier Field	35,807	Recap

Note: Intra-division opponents are in bold text.

=== Game summaries ===
==== Week 1 at Oilers ====
Week One: Green Bay Packers (0–0) at Houston Oilers (0–0)

Quarter	1	2	3	4	OT	Total
**Packers**	7	21	3	7	3	**41**
Oilers	10	0	7	21	0	**38**

at Houston Astrodome, Houston, Texas

- Date: September 4
- Game time: 1:00 p.m. EST
- Game weather: Indoors (dome)
- Game attendance: 44,073
- Referee: Bob McElwee
- TV announcers (CBS): Frank Glieber and Dick Vermeil
- Box Score, Box Score

Game information

**First quarter**

- GB – Paul Coffman 25-yard pass from Lynn Dickey (Jan Stenerud kick), 10:31. Packers 7–0. Drive:
- HOU – Florian Kempf 49-yard field goal, 6:30. Packers 7–3. Drive:
- HOU – Tim Smith 47-yard pass from Archie Manning (Florian Kempf kick), 2:40. Oilers 10–7. Drive:

**Second quarter**

- GB – John Jefferson 5-yard pass from Lynn Dickey (Jan Stenerud kick), 8:55. Packers 14–10. Drive:
- GB – John Jefferson 13-yard pass from Lynn Dickey (Jan Stenerud kick), 0:51. Packers 21–10. Drive:
- GB – Gerry Ellis 11-yard pass from Lynn Dickey (Jan Stenerud kick), 0:30. Packers 28–10. Drive:

**Third quarter**

- HOU – Earl Campbell 7-yard run (Florian Kempf kick), 9:08. Packers 28–17. Drive:
- GB – Jan Stenerud 46-yard field goal, 4:36. Packers 31–17. Drive:

**Fourth quarter**

- HOU – Earl Campbell 8-yard run (Florian Kempf kick), 11:05. Packers 31–24. Drive:
- HOU – Earl Campbell 1-yard run (Florian Kempf kick), 4:23. Tie 31–31. Drive:
- GB – James Lofton 74-yard pass from Lynn Dickey (Jan Stenerud kick), 4:13. Packers 38–31. Drive:
- HOU – Larry Moriarty 2-yard run (Florian Kempf kick), 0:48. Tie 38–38. Drive:

**Overtime**

- GB – Jan Stenerud 42-yard field goal, 9:05. Packers 41–38. Drive:

Top passers

- GB – Lynn Dickey – 27/31, 333 yards, 5 TD, int
- HOU – Archie Manning – 22/34, 348 yards, TD, 2 int

Top rushers

- GB – Eddie Lee Ivery – 12 rushes, 71 yards
- HOU – Earl Campbell – 27 rushes, 123 yards, 3 TD

Top receivers

- GB – James Lofton – 8 receptions, 154 yards, TD
- HOU – Tim Smith – 8 receptions, 197 yards, TD

Lynn Dickey completed 27 of 31 passes, including 18 straight at one point during the game, for 333 yards and four touchdowns and Jan Stenerud's 42-yard field goal with 9:05 left in overtime give the Packers a successful opening day victory.

==== Week 16 at Bears ====
Week 16: Green Bay Packers (8–7) at Chicago Bears (7–8)

Quarter	1	2	3	4	Total
Packers	7	7	0	7	**21**
**Bears**	7	0	7	9	**23**

at Soldier Field, Chicago, Illinois

- Date: December 18
- Game time: 1:00 p.m.
- Game weather: 1 °F (−17 °C)
- Game attendance: 35,807
- Referee: Red Cashion
- Pro-Football-Reference.com, The Football Database

Game information

First quarter

- CHI – Willie Gault 35-yard pass from Jim McMahon (Bob Thomas kick), 9:24. Bears 7–0.
- GB – Lynn Dickey 1-yard run (Jan Stenerud kick), 8:10. Tie 7–7.

Second quarter

- GB – James Lofton 31-yard pass from Lynn Dickey (Jan Stenerud kick), 3:05. Packers 14–7.

Third quarter

- CHI – Dennis McKinnon 22-yard pass from Jim McMahon (Bob Thomas kick), 6:35. Tie 14–14.

Fourth quarter

- CHI – Jim McMahon 6-yard run (kick failed), 4:34. Bears 20–14.
- GB – Paul Coffman 5-yard pass from Lynn Dickey (Jan Stenerud kick), 3:08. Packers 21–20.
- CHI – Bob Thomas 22-yard field goal, 0:10. Bears 23–21.

Top passers

- GB – Lynn Dickey – 10/30, 262 yards, 2 TD, 4 int
- CHI – Jim McMahon – 14/25, 162 yards, 2 TD, 2 int

Top rushers

- GB – Jessie Clark – 7 rushes, 61 yards
- CHI – Walter Payton – 30 rushes, 148 yards

Top receivers

- GB – Paul Coffman – 4 receptions, 122 yards, TD
- CHI – Willie Gault – 2 receptions, 50 yards, TD

=== Standings ===
NFC Central
	W	L	T	PCT	DIV	CONF	PF	PA	STK
Detroit Lions^{(3)}	9	7	0	.563	7–1	8–4	347	286	W1
Green Bay Packers	8	8	0	.500	4–4	6–6	429	439	L1
Chicago Bears	8	8	0	.500	4–4	7–7	311	301	W2
Minnesota Vikings	8	8	0	.500	4–4	4–8	316	348	W1
Tampa Bay Buccaneers	2	14	0	.125	1–7	1–11	241	380	L3

== Statistics ==
=== Passing ===
Player	Attempts	Completion	Percentage	Yards	Avg	Long	TD	Int	Rating
Lynn Dickey	484	289	59.7%	4458	9.21	75	32	29	87.3

=== Receiving ===
Player	Receptions	Yards	Average	TD	Long
James Lofton	58	1300	22.4	8	74
John Jefferson	57	830	14.6	7	36
Paul Coffman	54	814	15.1	11	74
Gerry Ellis	52	603	11.6	2	56

=== Rushing ===
Player	Attempts	Yards	avg	TD	Long
Gerry Ellis	141	696	4.9	4	71
Eddie Lee Ivery	86	340	4.0	2	21
Jessie Clark	71	328	4.6	0	42
Harlan Huckleby	50	182	3.6	4	20

=== Defensive ===
Player	Sacks	INT'S	Yards	Average	TD	Long
John Anderson	4.5	5	54	10.8	1	27t
Greg Boyd	2.0	0	0	0.0	0	0
Byron Braggs	5.5	0	0	0.0	0	0
George Cumby	2.0	0	0	0.0	0	0
Mike Douglass	5.5	0	0	0.0	0	0
Johnnie Gray	0.0	2	5	2.5	0	5
Charles Johnson	3.5	0	0	0.0	0	0
Ezra Johnson	14.5	0	0	0.0	0	0
Mike Jolly	0.0	1	0	0.0	0	0
Jim Laughlin	0.0	1	22	22.0	0	22
Mark Lee	0.0	4	23	5.8	0	15
Cliff Lewis	2.0	0	0	0.0	0	0
Tim Lewis	0.0	5	111	22.2	0	46
Randy Scott	0.0	1	12	12.0	0	12

== Records ==
- Lynn Dickey, club record, most passing yards in one season, 4,458. First NFC Quarterback to ever throw for over 4,000 yards
- NFL record, most overtime games played in one season, (5)
