= 1982 Green Bay Packers season =

NFL team season

- Head coach: Bart Starr
- Offensive coordinator: Bob Schnelker
- Defensive coordinator: John Meyer
- Home stadium: Lambeau Field; Milwaukee County Stadium

Results
- Record: 5–3–1
- Division place: 3rd NFC (1st NFC Central)
- Playoffs: Won Wild Card Playoffs (vs. Cardinals) 41–16; Lost Divisional Playoffs (at Cowboys) 26–37

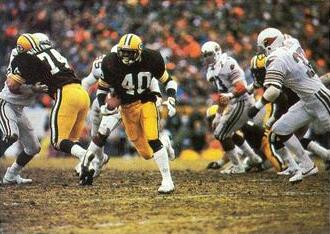
The Packers playing against the Cardinals in the 1982 NFC first round playoff game

The 1982 Green Bay Packers season was their 64th season overall and their 62nd season in the National Football League (NFL), and was shortened due to a players’ strike. The team posted a 5–3–1 record under coach Bart Starr. Due to the strike, the NFL ignored division standing and placed eight teams from each conference into the playoffs. The Packers finished the season in third place, which earned them a playoff berth. The Packers beat the St. Louis Cardinals 41–16 in the first round, but lost to the Dallas Cowboys 37–26 in the second. Their playoff berth was the first for the Packers in ten seasons, their first playoff win in the post-Vince Lombardi era, and their only playoff win between 1968 and 1992. Additionally, the game against the Cardinals was their first home playoff game since the Super Bowl season of 1967.

The strike caused two side effects for the Packers' schedule, as both games in the Bears–Packers rivalry were cancelled, defaulting the Lions–Packers rivalry to being the longest-running annual series in the league. Only one regular season home game was played at Lambeau Field, with the remaining three regular-season home games in Milwaukee at County Stadium on a field which had already taken much heavier than usual abuse due to the Brewers' World Series run, although the playoff game against the Cardinals was at Lambeau.

== Offseason ==
=== NFL draft ===
1982 Green Bay Packers draft
Round	Pick	Player	Position	College	Notes
1	22	Ron Hallstrom	Guard	Iowa	
3	71	Del Rodgers	Running back	Utah	
4	98	Robert Brown	Linebacker	Virginia Tech	
5	126	Mike Meade	Running back	Penn State	
6	152	Chet Parlavecchio	Linebacker	Penn State	
7	183	Joel Whitley	Defensive back	UTEP	
8	210	Thomas Boyd	Linebacker	Alabama	
9	237	Charles Riggins	Defensive end	Bethune–Cookman	
10	264	Eddie Garcia	Kicker	SMU	
11	294	John Macauley	Center	Stanford	
12	321	Phil Epps	Wide receiver	TCU	
Made roster

=== Undrafted free agents ===
1982 undrafted free agents of note
Player	Position	College
Wamon Buggs	Wide receiver	Vanderbilt
Britt Freeman	Wide receiver	Montana State
Kerry Hafner	Tight end	Wisconsin–Stout
Larry Rubens	Linebacker	Montana State
Tony Vitale	Guard	Central Michigan

== Personnel ==
=== Staff ===
1982 Green Bay Packers staff
Front office: President – Robert J. Parins; Corporate assistant to the president – Bob Harlan; Director of player personnel – Dick Corrick; Head coaches: Head coach – Bart Starr; Offensive coaches: Offensive coordinator – Bob Schnelker; Offensive backs – Pete Kettela; Receivers – Lew Carpenter; Offensive line – Ernie McMillan; Assistant offensive line – Bill Meyers	Defensive coaches: Defensive coordinator – John Meyer; Defensive line – Doc Urich; Linebackers – John Marshall; Defensive backs – Ross Fichtner; Quality control – Dave Hanner; Special teams coaches: Special teams – Dick Rehbein

=== Roster ===
1982 Green Bay Packers roster
Quarterbacks (QB): 19 Rich Campbell; 12 Lynn Dickey; 17 David Whitehurst; Running backs (RB): 34 Allan Clark; 31 Gerry Ellis; 25 Harlan Huckleby; 40 Eddie Lee Ivery; 33 Jim Jensen; 35 Del Rodgers; Wide receivers (WR): 85 Phil Epps; 83 John Jefferson; 80 James Lofton; Tight ends (TE): 82 Paul Coffman; 81 Gary Lewis; 87 John Thompson	Offensive linemen (OL): 79 Angelo Fields T; 57 Derrel Gofourth G; 65 Ron Hallstrom G; 69 Leotis Harris G; 74 Tim Huffman G; 68 Greg Koch T; 54 Larry McCarren C; 58 Larry Rubens C; 78 Tim Stokes T; Defensive linemen (DL): 73 Byron Braggs DE; 77 Mike Butler DE; 90 Ezra Johnson DE; 63 Terry Jones NT; 78 Casey Merrill DE; 75 Richard Turner NT	Linebackers (LB): 59 John Anderson OLB; 93 Robert Brown OLB; 52 George Cumby ILB; 53 Mike Douglass OLB; 60 Jim Laslavic ILB; 56 Cliff Lewis OLB; 62 Mark Merrill ILB; 51 Guy Prather OLB; 55 Randy Scott ILB; Defensive backs (DB): 24 Johnnie Gray SS; 23 Maurice Harvey FS; 38 Estus Hood CB; 21 Mike Jolly FS; 22 Mark Lee CB; 29 Mike McCoy CB; 37 Mark Murphy SS; 30 Bill Whitaker FS; Special teams (ST): 16 Ray Stachowicz P; 10 Jan Stenerud K	Reserve: 88 Ron Cassidy WR (IR); 96 Ralph DeLoach DE (IR); 18 Eddie Garcia K (IR); 64 Syd Kitson G (IR); 39 Mike Meade RB (IR); 84 Fred Nixon WR (IR); 94 Chet Parlavecchio LB (IR); 66 Larry Pfohl G (IR); 67 Karl Swanke T (IR); 50 Rich Wingo LB (IR); Rookies in italics 49 active

== Regular season ==
=== Schedule ===
Week	Original week	Date	Opponent	Result	Record	Venue
1	1	September 12	Los Angeles Rams	**W** 35–23	1–0	Milwaukee County Stadium
2	2	September 20	at New York Giants	**W** 27–19	2–0	Giants Stadium
—	3	September 26	Miami Dolphins	Canceled	2–0	Game not held due to 1982 NFL strike
—	4	October 3	Philadelphia Eagles	Canceled	2–0	Game not held due to 1982 NFL strike
—	5	October 10	at Chicago Bears	Canceled	2–0	Game not held due to 1982 NFL strike
—	6	October 17	Tampa Bay Buccaneers	Canceled	2–0	Game not held due to 1982 NFL strike
—	7	October 24	at Minnesota Vikings	Canceled	2–0	Game not held due to 1982 NFL strike
—	8	October 31	Chicago Bears	Canceled	2–0	Game not held due to 1982 NFL strike
—	9	November 7	at Tampa Bay Buccaneers	Canceled	2–0	Game not held due to 1982 NFL strike
—	10	November 14	at **Detroit Lions**	Postponed	2–0	Played on January 2 due to 1982 NFL strike
3	11	November 21	**Minnesota Vikings**	**W** 26–7	3–0	Milwaukee County Stadium
4	12	November 28	at New York Jets	**L** 13–15	3–1	Shea Stadium
5	13	December 5	Buffalo Bills	**W** 33–21	4–1	Milwaukee County Stadium
6	14	December 12	**Detroit Lions**	**L** 10–30	4–2	Lambeau Field
7	15	December 19	at Baltimore Colts	**T** 20–20 (OT)	4–2–1	Memorial Stadium
8	16	December 26	at Atlanta Falcons	**W** 38–7	5–2–1	Atlanta–Fulton County Stadium
9	17	January 2, 1983	at **Detroit Lions**	**L** 24–27	5–3–1	Pontiac Silverdome
Note: Intra-division opponents are in **bold** text.

== Standings ==
NFC Central
	W	L	T	PCT	DIV	CONF	PF	PA	STK
Green Bay Packers^{(3)}	5	3	1	.611	1–2	4–2	226	169	L1
Minnesota Vikings^{(4)}	5	4	0	.556	3–1	4–1	158	178	W3
Tampa Bay Buccaneers^{(7)}	5	4	0	.556	2–1	3–3	158	178	W1
Detroit Lions^{(8)}	4	5	0	.444	3–3	4–4	181	176	W1
Chicago Bears	3	6	0	.333	1–3	2–5	141	174	L1

NFC
#	Team	W	L	T	PCT	PF	PA	STK
Seeded postseason qualifiers
1	Washington Redskins	8	1	0	.889	190	128	W4
2	Dallas Cowboys	6	3	0	.667	226	145	L2
3	Green Bay Packers	5	3	1	.611	226	169	L1
4 (Note: Minnesota (4–1), Atlanta (4–3), St. Louis (5–4), Tampa Bay (3–3) seeds were determined by best won-lost record in conference games.)	Minnesota Vikings	5	4	0	.556	187	198	W1
5	Atlanta Falcons	5	4	0	.556	183	199	L2
6	St. Louis Cardinals	5	4	0	.556	135	170	L1
7	Tampa Bay Buccaneers	5	4	0	.556	158	178	W3
8 (Note: Detroit finished ahead of New Orleans and the N.Y. Giants based on best conference record (4–4 to Saints’ 3–5 to Giants’ 3–5).)	Detroit Lions	4	5	0	.444	181	176	W1
Did not qualify for the postseason
9	New Orleans Saints	4	5	0	.444	129	160	W1
10	New York Giants	4	5	0	.444	164	160	W1
11 (Note: San Francisco finished ahead of Chicago, and Chicago finished ahead of Philadelphia, based on conference record (49ers’ 2–3 to Bears’ 2–5 to Eagles’ 1–5).)	San Francisco 49ers	3	6	0	.333	209	206	L1
12	Chicago Bears	3	6	0	.333	141	174	L1
13	Philadelphia Eagles	3	6	0	.333	191	195	L1
14	Los Angeles Rams	2	7	0	.222	200	250	W1
Tiebreakers

== Playoffs ==
=== NFC First Round ===
Green Bay Packers 41, St. Louis Cardinals 16

Quarter	1	2	3	4	Total
Cardinals	3	6	0	7	16
Packers	7	21	10	3	41

at Lambeau Field, Green Bay, Wisconsin

- Game time: 12:30 p.m. EST/11:30 a.m. CST
- Game weather: 26 °F (−3.3 °C), overcast
- Game attendance: 54,282
- Referee: Fred Wyant
- TV announcers (CBS): Tim Ryan and Johnny Morris

In the Packers' first home playoff game in 15 years, quarterback Lynn Dickey threw for 260 yards and 4 touchdowns en route to a 41–16 win. The Packers scored four touchdowns on four consecutive possessions. It was their first playoff victory since Super Bowl II.

=== NFC Second Round ===
Dallas Cowboys 37, Green Bay Packers 26

Quarter	1	2	3	4	Total
Packers	0	7	6	13	26
Cowboys	6	14	3	14	37

at Texas Stadium, Irving, Texas

- Game time: 4:00 p.m. EST/3:00 p.m. CST
- Game weather: 54 °F (12.2 °C), sunny
- Game attendance: 63,972
- Referee: Gene Barth
- TV announcers (CBS): Pat Summerall and John Madden

The Cowboys scored touchdowns on two 80-yard drives while cornerback Dennis Thurman had 3 interceptions, including a 39-yard touchdown and one to clinch the victory. Packers quarterback Lynn Dickey threw for a franchise postseason record 332 yards and a touchdown, but his 3 interceptions were too costly to overcome. Receiver James Lofton caught 5 passes for 109 yards and a touchdown, and also had a 71-yard touchdown run on a reverse play, which tied the record for longest running play in a playoff game at the time.

Green Bay finished the game with a franchise playoff record 466 total yards.

== Awards and records ==
- Led NFL in points scored (226)
