= 1985 Green Bay Packers season =

NFL team season

- Owner: Green Bay Packers, Inc.
- General manager: Bob Harlan
- Head coach: Forrest Gregg
- Home stadium: Lambeau Field; Milwaukee County Stadium

Results
- Record: 8–8
- Division place: 2nd NFC Central
- Playoffs: Did not qualify

The 1985 Green Bay Packers season was their 67th season overall and their 65th in the National Football League. The team finished with an 8–8 record under second-year head coach Forrest Gregg, the same record as the previous two seasons.

The Packers were again second in the NFC Central division, but seven games behind the Chicago Bears, the eventual Super Bowl champions.

== Offseason ==
=== NFL draft ===
1985 Green Bay Packers draft
Round	Pick	Player	Position	College	Notes
1	7	Ken Ruettgers	Offensive tackle	USC	
3	71	Rich Moran	Guard	San Diego State	
4	98	Walter Stanley	Wide receiver	Mesa State	
5	125	Brian Noble	Linebacker	Arizona State	
6	155	Mark Lewis	Tight end	Texas A&M	
7	171	Eric Wilson	Linebacker	Maryland	
7	182	Gary Ellerson	Running back	Wisconsin	
8	209	Ken Stills	Safety	Wisconsin	
9	239	Morris Johnson	Guard	Alabama A&M	
10	266	Ronnie Burgess	Cornerback	Wake Forest	
11	294	Joe Shield	Quarterback	Trinity	
12	323	Jim Meyer	Punter	Arizona State	
Made roster

=== Undrafted free agents ===
1985 undrafted free agents of note
Player	Position	College
Mark Allen	Defensive back	BYU
Keith Bratel	Wide receiver	Carroll
Mike Davis	Defensive end	Ball State
Mike Farley	Kicker	Wisconsin–River Falls
Deno Foster	Wide receiver	Cincinnati
Marc Hogan	Defensive back	Tennessee
Don Jefferson	Defensive back	Florida A&M
Shawn Jones	Running back	Oklahoma State
Bill Mayo	Offensive line	Tennessee
Peter Quinlan	Defensive line	Holy Cross
David Texeira	Kicker	American International
Ralph Williams	Wide receiver	Miami (OH)

== Personnel ==
=== Staff ===
1985 Green Bay Packers staff
Front office: President – Robert J. Parins; Corporate assistant to the president – Bob Harlan; Director of player personnel – Dick Corrick; Director of player procurement – Chuck Hutchison; Head coaches: Head coach – Forrest Gregg; Offensive coaches: Offensive coordinator – Bob Schnelker; Offensive backs – George Sefcik; Receivers – Lew Carpenter; Offensive line – Jerry Wampfler	Defensive coaches: Defensive coordinator/defensive line – Dick Modzelewski; Linebackers – Herb Paterra; Defensive backs – Ken Riley; Special teams coaches: Special teams – Chuck Priefer; Strength and conditioning: Strength and conditioning – Virgil Knight

=== Roster ===
1985 Green Bay Packers roster
Quarterbacks (QB): 12 Lynn Dickey; 5 Vince Ferragamo; 16 Randy Wright; 18 Jim Zorn; Running backs (RB): 33 Jessie Clark; 42 Gary Ellerson; 31 Gerry Ellis; 40 Eddie Lee Ivery; Wide receivers (WR): 88 Preston Dennard; 85 Phil Epps; 80 James Lofton; 87 Walter Stanley; Tight ends (TE): 82 Paul Coffman; 89 Mark Lewis; 86 Ed West	Offensive linemen (OL): 58 Mark Cannon C; 65 Ron Hallstrom G; 68 Greg Koch T; 60 Blake Moore C; 57 Rich Moran G; 75 Ken Ruettgers T; 61 Blake Wingle C/G; Defensive linemen (DL): 93 Robert Brown DE; 77 Mike Butler DE; 76 Alphonso Carreker DE; 79 Donnie Humphrey NT; 90 Ezra Johnson DE; 94 Charles Martin NT	Linebackers (LB): 59 John Anderson OLB; 52 George Cumby ILB; 99 John Dorsey ILB; 53 Mike Douglass OLB; 91 Brian Noble ILB; 51 Guy Prather OLB; 55 Randy Scott ILB; Defensive backs (DB): 24 Mossy Cade CB; 23 Chuck Clanton SS; 41 Tom Flynn FS; 27 Gary Hayes CB; 22 Mark Lee CB; 26 Tim Lewis CB; 37 Mark Murphy SS; 29 Ken Stills FS; Special teams (ST): 17 Don Bracken P; 10 Al Del Greco K	Reserve: 39 Ronnie Burgess CB/S (IR); 25 Harlan Huckleby RB (IR); 74 Tim Huffman G (IR); 43 Daryll Jones S (IR); 28 Mike McLeod S (IR); 35 Del Rodgers RB (IR); 67 Karl Swanke T (IR); 70 Keith Uecker G (IR); 50 Rich Wingo LB (IR); Rookies in italics

== Regular season ==
The Packers finished with an 8–8 record for a third consecutive season; 5–3 at home and 3–5 on the road.

=== Schedule ===
Week	Date	Opponent	Result	Record	Venue	Recap
1	September 8	at New England Patriots	**L** 20–26	0–1	Sullivan Stadium	Recap
2	September 15	New York Giants	**W** 23–20	1–1	Lambeau Field	Recap
3	September 22	New York Jets	**L** 3–24	1–2	Milwaukee County Stadium	Recap
4	September 29	at St. Louis Cardinals	**L** 28–43	1–3	Busch Memorial Stadium	Recap
5	October 6	**Detroit Lions**	**W** 43–10	2–3	Lambeau Field	Recap
6	October 13	**Minnesota Vikings**	**W** 20–17	3–3	Milwaukee County Stadium	Recap
7	October 21	at **Chicago Bears**	**L** 7–23	3–4	Soldier Field	Recap
8	October 27	at Indianapolis Colts	**L** 10–37	3–5	Hoosier Dome	Recap
9	November 3	**Chicago Bears**	**L** 10–16	3–6	Lambeau Field	Recap
10	November 10	at **Minnesota Vikings**	**W** 27–17	4–6	Hubert H. Humphrey Metrodome	Recap
11	November 17	New Orleans Saints	**W** 38–14	5–6	Milwaukee County Stadium	Recap
12	November 24	at Los Angeles Rams	**L** 17–34	5–7	Anaheim Stadium	Recap
13	December 1	**Tampa Bay Buccaneers**	**W** 21–0	6–7	Lambeau Field	Recap
14	December 8	Miami Dolphins	**L** 24–34	6–8	Lambeau Field	Recap
15	December 15	at **Detroit Lions**	**W** 26–23	7–8	Pontiac Silverdome	Recap
16	December 22	at **Tampa Bay Buccaneers**	**W** 20–17	8–8	Tampa Stadium	Recap

Note: Intra-division opponents are in bold text.

=== Game summaries ===
==== Week 10 ====
Team	1	2	3	4	Total
• Packers	3	3	0	21	27
Vikings	7	0	7	3	17

- Date: November 10
- Location: Hubert H. Humphrey Metrodome, Minneapolis, Minnesota
- Game start: 12:00 p.m.
- Referee: Gene Barth

Scoring summary
1	MIN	Ted Brown 1-yard run (Jan Stenerud kick)	Vikings 7–0
1	GB	Al Del Greco 46-yard field goal	Vikings 7–3
2	GB	Al Del Greco 28-yard field goal	Vikings 7–6
3	MIN	Darrin Nelson 4-yard run (Jan Stenerud kick)	Vikings 14–6
4	MIN	Jan Stenerud 24-yard field goal	Vikings 17–6
4	GB	Gerry Ellis 1-yard run (Al Del Greco kick)	Vikings 17–13
4	GB	Eddie Lee Ivery 1-yard pass from Lynn Dickey (Al Del Greco kick)	Packers 20–17
4	GB	Mark Murphy 50-yard interception return (Al Del Greco kick)	Packers 27–17

==== Week 13 ====
Team	1	2	3	4	Total
Buccaneers	0	0	0	0	0
• **Packers**	0	7	7	7	21

- Date: December 1
- Location: Lambeau Field • Green Bay, Wisconsin
- Game start: 12:00 p.m.
- Game attendance: 79,856
- Game weather: Snow • 30 °F (−1 °C) • Wind 21 mph (34 km/h)
- Referee: Ben Dreith
- TV announcers (CBS): Jim Hill and John Dockery

Scoring summary
2	GB	Lynn Dickey 1-yard run (Al Del Greco kick)	Packers 7–0
3	GB	Gerry Ellis 35-yard run (Al Del Greco kick)	Packers 14–0
4	GB	Jessie Clark 3-yard run (Al Del Greco kick)	Packers 21–0

This divisional matchup with Tampa Bay would come to be known as the Snow Bowl in Packers' history. By kickoff, twelves inches of snow had fallen and the roads were impossible to navigate preventing many fans from attending. This gave the game the dubious distinction of having over 36,000 "no-shows", the most in Packers history.

The game itself saw the Packers dominate the Buccaneers en route to a 21–0 victory. The Packers offense gained 512 total yards to the Buccaneers' 65. During the game, Packers defensive end Alphonso Carreker sacked Buccaneers quarterback Steve Young a team record four times.

=== Standings ===
NFC Central
	W	L	T	PCT	DIV	CONF	PF	PA	STK
Chicago Bears^{(1)}	15	1	0	.938	8–0	12–0	456	198	W3
Green Bay Packers	8	8	0	.500	6–2	8–4	337	355	W2
Minnesota Vikings	7	9	0	.438	3–5	5–9	346	359	L2
Detroit Lions	7	9	0	.438	2–6	5–7	307	366	L3
Tampa Bay Buccaneers	2	14	0	.125	1–7	2–10	294	448	L4

== Statistics ==
=== Passing ===
Player	Attempts	Completion	Percentage	Yards	Avg	Long	TD	Int	Sacks	Rating
Lynn Dickey	314	172	54.8	2206	7.03	63	15	17	30	70.4
Jim Zorn	123	56	45.5	794	6.46	56t	4	6	11	57.4
Randy Wright	74	39	52.7	552	7.46	38	2	4	8	63.6
TOTALS	513	267	52.0	3552	6.92	63	21	27	0	66.0

=== Receiving ===
Player	Receptions	Yards	Average	TD	Long
James Lofton	69	1153	16.7	4	56t
Paul Coffman	49	666	13.6	6	32
Phil Epps	44	683	15.5	3	63
Eddie Lee Ivery	28	270	9.6	2	24
Jessie Clark	24	252	10.5	2	55t
Gerry Ellis	24	206	8.6	0	35
Preston Dennard	13	182	14.0	2	34
Ed West	8	95	11.9	1	30
Harlan Huckleby	5	27	5.4	0	8
TOTALS	267	3552	13.3	21	63

=== Rushing ===
Player	Attempts	Yards	avg	TD	Long
Eddie Lee Ivery	132	636	4.8	2	34
Jessie Clark	147	633	4.3	5	80
Gerry Ellis	104	571	5.5	5	39t
Gary Ellerson	32	205	6.4	2	37t
Phil Epps	5	103	20.6	1	34
Harlan Huckleby	8	41	5.1	0	15
Lynn Dickey	18	−12	−0.7	1	3
TOTALS	470	2208	4.7	16	8

=== Defensive ===
Player	Sacks	INT'S	Yards	Average	TD	Long
John Anderson	6.0	2	2	1.0	0	2
Robert Brown	3.0	0	0	0.0	0	0
Mike Butler	2.0	0	0	0.0	0	0
Mossy Cade	0.0	1	0	0.0	0	0
Alphonso Carreker	9.0	0	0	0.0	0	0
Mike Douglass	1.5	2	126	63.0	1	80t
Tom Flynn	0.0	1	7	7.0	0	7
Donnie Humphrey	2.0	0	0	0.0	0	0
Ezra Johnson	9.5	0	0	0.0	0	0
Mark Lee	0.0	1	23	23.0	0	23
Tim Lewis	0.0	4	4	1.0	0	4
Charles Martin	3.0	0	0	0.0	0	0
Mark Murphy	4.0	2	50	25.0	1	50t
Brian Noble	3.0	0	0	0.0	0	0
Guy Prather	2.0	0	0	0.0	0	0
Randy Scott	3.0	2	50	25.0	0	30
TOTALS	48.0	15	262	17.5	2	8

== Awards and records ==
=== Hall of Famers ===
The following were inducted into the Green Bay Packers Hall of Fame in February 1985;

- Phil Bengtson, Coach-GM, 1959–1970
- Bob Jeter, CB, 1963–1970
- Earl "Bud" Svendsen, C-LB, 1937, 1939
