= 1986 Green Bay Packers season =

NFL team season

- Head coach: Forrest Gregg
- Home stadium: Lambeau Field; Milwaukee County Stadium

Results
- Record: 4–12
- Division place: 4th NFC Central
- Playoffs: Did not qualify
- Pro Bowlers: None

The 1986 Green Bay Packers season was their 68th season overall and their 66th season in the National Football League, and their third under head coach Forrest Gregg. Unable to improve on their 8–8 records from 1983, 1984, and 1985, the Packers failed to qualify for the playoffs for the fourth consecutive season, and instead went 4–12 for their fourth consecutive non-winning season, as well as their first losing season since 1980. Their .250 winning percentage was their worst since 1958.

The Packers reached their nadir on the afternoon of November 23 at Soldier Field vs. their ancient archrivals, the Bears. After Mark Lee intercepted Jim McMahon in the second quarter, Green Bay defensive end Charles Martin picked up McMahon and slammed him shoulder-first into the artificial turf, causing a season-ending injury to the Chicago quarterback. Martin was ejected by referee Jerry Markbreit and suspended two games by Commissioner Pete Rozelle.

== Offseason ==
=== NFL draft ===
1986 Green Bay Packers draft
| Round | Pick | Player | Position | College | Notes |
| 2 | 41 | Kenneth Davis | Running back | TCU | |
| 3 | 72 | Robbie Bosco | Quarterback | BYU | |
| 4 | 84 | Tim Harris * | Defensive end | Memphis State | |
| 4 | 98 | Dan Knight | Offensive tackle | San Diego State | |
| 5 | 125 | Matt Koart | Defensive tackle | USC | |
| 6 | 145 | Burnell Dent | Linebacker | Tulane | |
| 7 | 183 | Ed Berry | Safety | Utah State | |
| 8 | 210 | Micheal Cline | Defensive tackle | Arkansas State | |
| 9 | 236 | Brent Moore | Linebacker | USC | |
| 10 | 263 | Gary Spann | Linebacker | TCU | |
Made roster * Made at least one Pro Bowl during career

=== Undrafted free agents ===
1986 undrafted free agents of note
| Player | Position | College |
|---|---|---|
| Kirk Abernathy | Tight end | Drake |
| Scott Auker | Tight end | Idaho |
| Steve Buxton | Offensive tackle | Indiana State |
| Dean Dimido | Tight end | Penn State |
| Paul Gruner | Guard | Wisconsin–Platteville |
| Jesse Jones | Fullback | Montana State |
| Mike Jones | Wide receiver | Wisconsin |
| Peter Kortebein | Linebacker | Dartmouth |
| Mike Mallory | Linebacker | Michigan |
| Ruben Mendoza | Guard | Wayne State (NE) |
| Mike Moffitt | Wide receiver | Fresno State |
| Daryl Newell | Offensive tackle | Northwestern |
| Freddie Parker | Running back | Mississippi Valley State |
| Shawn Regent | Center | Boston College |

== Personnel ==
=== Staff ===
1986 Green Bay Packers staff
| Front office: President – Robert J. Parins; Corporate Assistant to the President – Bob Harlan; Director of Player Personnel – Dick Corrick; Director of Player Procurement – Chuck Hutchison; Head coaches: Head Coach – Forrest Gregg; Offensive coaches: Quarterbacks – George Sefcik; Offensive Backs – John Hilton; Receivers/Passing Game – Tom Coughlin; Offensive Line – Virgil Knight; Offensive Line – Jerry Wampfler | Defensive coaches: Defensive Coordinator/Defensive Line – Dick Modzelewski; Linebackers – Dale Lindsey; Defensive Backs – Dick Jauron; Special teams coaches: Special Teams – John Hilton; Strength and conditioning: Strength and Conditioning – Virgil Knight |

=== Roster ===
1986 Green Bay Packers roster
| Quarterbacks: 4 Chuck Fusina; 18 Joe Shield; 16 Randy Wright; Running backs: 30 Paul Ott Carruth; 36 Kenneth Davis; 42 Gary Ellerson; 31 Gerry Ellis; 40 Eddie Lee Ivery; Wide receivers: 84 Nolan Franz; 82 Mike Moffitt; 87 Walter Stanley; Tight ends: 89 Mark Lewis; 81 Dan Ross; 86 Ed West | Offensive linemen: 69 Bill Cherry C; 77 Greg Feasel T; 65 Ron Hallstrom G; 57 Rich Moran G; 72 Tom Neville G; 75 Ken Ruettgers T; 67 Karl Swanke C; 73 Alan Veingrad T; Defensive linemen: 93 Robert Brown DE; 76 Alphonso Carreker DE; 79 Donnie Humphrey NT; 90 Ezra Johnson DE; 94 Charles Martin NT; 92 Ben Thomas DE | Linebackers: 56 Burnell Dent ILB; 99 John Dorsey ILB; 97 Tim Harris OLB; 53 Bobby Leopold OLB; 91 Brian Noble OLB; 55 Randy Scott ILB; 52 Mike Weddington OLB; Defensive backs: 20 Ed Berry CB; 24 Mossy Cade CB; 23 Tiger Greene SS; 49 David Greenwood SS; 22 Mark Lee CB; 32 John Simmons CB; 29 Ken Stills FS; 28 Elbert Watts CB; Special teams: 10 Al Del Greco K; 13 Bill Renner P | Reserve lists: 59 John Anderson LB (IR); 11 Robbie Bosco QB (IR); 17 Don Bracken P (IR); 58 Mark Cannon C (IR); 33 Jessie Clark FB (IR); 85 Phil Epps WR (IR); 60 Dan Knight- T (NF-Ill.); 92 Matt Koart DE (IR); 26 Tim Lewis CB (IR); 80 James Lofton WR (Susp.); 98 Brent Moore LB (IR); 37 Mark Murphy S (IR); 39 Freddie Parker RB (IR); 70 Keith Uecker G (IR); Rookies in italics |

== Regular season ==
=== Schedule ===
| Week | Date | Opponent | Result | Record | Venue | Attendance | Recap |
|---|---|---|---|---|---|---|---|
| 1 | September 7 | Houston Oilers | L 3–31 | 0–1 | Lambeau Field | 54,065 | Recap |
| 2 | September 14 | at New Orleans Saints | L 10–24 | 0–2 | Louisiana Superdome | 46,383 | Recap |
| 3 | September 22 | Chicago Bears | L 12–25 | 0–3 | Lambeau Field | 55,527 | Recap |
| 4 | September 28 | at Minnesota Vikings | L 7–42 | 0–4 | Hubert H. Humphrey Metrodome | 60,478 | Recap |
| 5 | October 5 | Cincinnati Bengals | L 28–34 | 0–5 | Milwaukee County Stadium | 51,230 | Recap |
| 6 | October 12 | Detroit Lions | L 14–21 | 0–6 | Lambeau Field | 52,290 | Recap |
| 7 | October 19 | at Cleveland Browns | W 17–14 | 1–6 | Cleveland Stadium | 76,438 | Recap |
| 8 | October 26 | San Francisco 49ers | L 17–31 | 1–7 | Milwaukee County Stadium | 50,557 | Recap |
| 9 | November 2 | at Pittsburgh Steelers | L 3–27 | 1–8 | Three Rivers Stadium | 52,831 | Recap |
| 10 | November 9 | Washington Redskins | L 7–16 | 1–9 | Lambeau Field | 47,728 | Recap |
| 11 | November 16 | Tampa Bay Buccaneers | W 31–7 | 2–9 | Milwaukee County Stadium | 48,271 | Recap |
| 12 | November 23 | at Chicago Bears | L 10–12 | 2–10 | Soldier Field | 59,291 | Recap |
| 13 | November 27 | at Detroit Lions | W 44–40 | 3–10 | Pontiac Silverdome | 61,199 | Recap |
| 14 | December 7 | Minnesota Vikings | L 6–32 | 3–11 | Lambeau Field | 47,637 | Recap |
| 15 | December 14 | at Tampa Bay Buccaneers | W 21–7 | 4–11 | Tampa Stadium | 30,099 | Recap |
| 16 | December 20 | at New York Giants | L 24–55 | 4–12 | Giants Stadium | 71,351 | Recap |

=== Standings ===
NFC Central
| | W | L | T | PCT | DIV | CONF | PF | PA | STK |
|---|---|---|---|---|---|---|---|---|---|
| Chicago Bears^{(2)} | 14 | 2 | 0 | .875 | 7–1 | 10–2 | 352 | 187 | W7 |
| Minnesota Vikings | 9 | 7 | 0 | .563 | 6–2 | 8–4 | 398 | 273 | W1 |
| Detroit Lions | 5 | 11 | 0 | .313 | 3–5 | 4–8 | 277 | 326 | L4 |
| Green Bay Packers | 4 | 12 | 0 | .250 | 3–5 | 3–9 | 254 | 418 | L1 |
| Tampa Bay Buccaneers | 2 | 14 | 0 | .125 | 1–7 | 1–13 | 239 | 473 | L7 |

== Statistics ==
=== Passing ===
| Player | Attempts | Completion | Percentage | Yards | Avg | Long | TD | Int | Sacks | Rating |
| Randy Wright | 492 | 263 | 53.5 | 3247 | 6.60 | 62 | 17 | 23 | 33 | 66.2 |
| Vince Ferragamo | 40 | 23 | 57.5 | 283 | 7.08 | 50 | 1 | 5 | 3 | 56.6 |
| Chuck Fusina | 32 | 19 | 59.4 | 178 | 5.56 | 42 | 0 | 1 | 1 | 61.7 |

=== Receiving ===
| Player | Receptions | Yards | Average | TD | Long |
| James Lofton | 64 | 840 | 13.1 | 4 | 36 |
| Phil Epps | 49 | 612 | 12.5 | 4 | 53t |
| Walter Stanley | 35 | 723 | 20.7 | 2 | 62 |
| Eddie Lee Ivery | 31 | 385 | 12.4 | 1 | 42 |
| Gerry Ellis | 24 | 258 | 10.8 | 0 | 29 |
| Paul Ott Carruth | 24 | 134 | 5.6 | 2 | 19 |
| Kenneth Davis | 21 | 142 | 6.8 | 1 | 18 |
| Dan Ross | 17 | 143 | 8.4 | 1 | 16 |
| Ed West | 15 | 199 | 13.3 | 1 | 46t |
| Gary Ellerson | 12 | 130 | 10.8 | 0 | 32 |
| Jessie Clark | 6 | 41 | 6.8 | 0 | 12 |
| Mike Moffitt | 4 | 87 | 21.8 | 0 | 34 |
| Nolan Franz | 1 | 16 | 16 | 0 | 16 |
| TOTALS | 305 | 3708 | 12.2 | 18 | 62 |

== Awards and milestones ==
=== Hall of Fame inductions ===
In 1986, Packer great Paul Hornung was inducted to the Pro Football Hall of Fame.

The following were inducted into the Green Bay Packers Hall of Fame in February 1986;

- Lee Roy Caffey, LB, 1964–1969
- Irv Comp, B, 1943–1949
