= Ed Garcia (disambiguation) =

Ed Garcia (born February 3, 1943) is a Filipino human rights activist, peace advocate, and writer.

Ed Garcia may also refer to:

- Eddie Garcia (1929–2019), Filipino actor, television personality, film director and producer
- Eddie Garcia (American football) (born 1959), American football player
- Edgar García (disambiguation)
- Edu García (born 1990), Spanish footballer
- Eduardo García (disambiguation)
- Edward J. Garcia (1928–2023), American judge
