= Gerry Ellis =

American football player (born 1957)

No. 31
- Position: Running back

Personal information
- Born: November 12, 1957 (age 68); Columbia, Missouri, U.S.
- Listed height: 5 ft 11 in (1.80 m)
- Listed weight: 221 lb (100 kg)

Career information
- High school: Hickman (Columbia)
- College: Missouri
- NFL draft: 1980: 7th round, 192nd overall pick

Career history
- Los Angeles Rams (1980)*; Green Bay Packers (1980–1986)
- * Offseason or practice squad member only

Awards and highlights
- Green Bay Packers Hall of Fame (1994); Second-team All-Big Eight (1979)

Career NFL statistics
- Rushing yards: 3,826
- Rushing average: 4.6
- Rushing touchdowns: 25
- Stats at Pro Football Reference

Gerry Ellis (born November 12, 1957) is an American former professional football player who was a running back for seven seasons with the Green Bay Packers of the National Football League (NFL). He played college football for the Missouri Tigers and was selected by the Los Angeles Rams in the 1980 NFL draft. He was inducted into the Green Bay Packers Hall of Fame in 1994.

== College career ==
After playing high school football at Hickman High School in Columbia, Missouri, Ellis spent his first year post-high school at Fort Scott Junior College. He later played at Missouri, where he started at fullback but was injured midway through his senior year. He returned in time for the 1979 Hall of Fame Classic against South Carolina, where he scored a touchdown.

== Professional career ==
Ellis was drafted 192nd overall by the Los Angeles Rams in the seventh round of the 1980 NFL draft, but was cut by the team in his first preseason and was claimed by the Green Bay Packers in free agency during the opening stages of the 1980 season. After rising to starting fullback in the middle of September 1980, Ellis scored his first career NFL touchdown against the Rams. He set Packers single-season team records for total offense by a running back and receiving yards by a running back in 1981, accumulating more than a quarter of Green Bay's total offensive yards. On September 30, 1984, Ellis caught a lateral from James Lofton as time expired against the Tampa Bay Buccaneers, scoring a touchdown and sending the game into overtime. The Packers unfortunately lost the game in overtime. After playing at fullback from 1980 to 1983, Ellis moved to running back before 1984. He led the Packers in rushing in both 1983 and 1984, and returned kicks for the Packers in 1985.

Before the 1987 season, Ellis was volunteering at a football camp for underserved youth and tore his Achilles tendon while working out, never to step on an NFL field again.

Ellis was inducted into the Green Bay Packers Hall of Fame in 1994.

== NFL career statistics ==
Legend
	Led the league
**Bold**	Career high

=== Regular season ===
Year	Team	Games		Rushing					Receiving				
Year	Team	GP	GS	Att	Yds	Avg	Lng	TD	Rec	Yds	Avg	Lng	TD
1980	GNB	15	13	126	545	4.3	22	**5**	48	496	10.3	**69**	**3**
1981	GNB	**16**	**16**	**196**	**860**	4.4	29	4	**65**	499	7.7	46	**3**
1982	GNB	9	8	62	228	3.7	29	1	18	140	7.8	20	0
1983	GNB	15	14	141	696	4.9	**71**	4	52	**603**	**11.6**	56	2
1984	GNB	**16**	**16**	123	581	4.7	50	4	36	312	8.7	22	2
1985	GNB	**16**	8	104	571	**5.5**	39	**5**	24	206	8.6	35	0
1986	GNB	**16**	6	84	345	4.1	24	2	24	258	10.8	29	0
		103	81	836	3,826	4.6	71	25	267	2,514	9.4	69	10

=== Playoffs ===
Year	Team	Games		Rushing					Receiving				
Year	Team	GP	GS	Att	Yds	Avg	Lng	TD	Rec	Yds	Avg	Lng	TD
1982	GNB	2	2	9	48	5.3	17	0	8	99	12.4	31	0
		2	2	9	48	5.3	17	0	8	99	12.4	31	0

== Personal life ==
Ellis grew up in Columbia, Missouri with eight siblings, where he competed in track and field and set Central Missouri Conference records in discus and shot put. While attending college at the University of Missouri, Ellis majored in education. He invested in real estate as a side job during his football career.
