= Edgar García =

Edgar Garcia may refer to:

- Edgar García (fighter) (born 1985)
- Edgar García (bullfighter) (1960–2020)
- Edgar Allan García (1958–2025), Ecuadorian writer
- Édgar García (baseball, born 1987)
- Édgar García (baseball, born 1996)

== See also ==
- Ed Garcia (disambiguation)
