= Lalo García =

Lalo García may refer to:

- Lalo García (basketball), Spanish basketball player
- Lalo García (artist), Mexican artist based in California, US
- Lalo García (chef) (born 1977), Mexican chef and restaurateur

== See also ==
- Eduardo García (disambiguation)
