= Eduardo García =

Eduardo García may refer to:

== Sports ==
- Eduardo Garcia (boxer) (born 1942), Mexican boxer and trainer
- Eduardo García (footballer, born 1945) (1945–2016), who represented both Uruguay and Ecuador
- Eduardo García (Mexican footballer) (born 2002), Mexican football goalkeeper
- Eduardo Garcia (runner), American and Virgin Islander runner
- Edu García (Eduardo García Martín, born 1990), Spanish footballer

== Other people ==
- Eduardo Garcia (American chef) (born 1981), American chef of Mexican cuisine
- Eduardo "Lalo" García (born 1977), Mexican chef based in Mexico City
- Eduardo Horacio García (born 1956), Roman Catholic auxiliary bishop of Buenos Aires
- Eduardo García de Enterría (1923–2013), Spanish jurist
- Eduardo García Máynez (1908–1993), Mexican jurist
- Eduardo Garcia (politician) (born 1977), member of the California State Assembly
- Eddie Garcia (1929–2019), Filipino film actor and director

== See also ==
- Ed Garcia (disambiguation)
- Lalo García (disambiguation)
