= Phil Epps =

American football player (born 1959)

No. 85, 89
- Position: Wide receiver

Personal information
- Born: November 11, 1958 (age 67); Atlanta, Texas, U.S.
- Listed height: 5 ft 10 in (1.78 m)
- Listed weight: 165 lb (75 kg)

Career information
- High school: Atlanta
- College: TCU
- NFL draft: 1982: 12th round, 321st overall pick

Career history
- Green Bay Packers (1982–1988); New York Jets (1989)

Career NFL statistics
- Receptions: 200
- Receiving yards: 2,992
- Receiving touchdowns: 14
- Stats at Pro Football Reference

Phillip Earl Epps (born November 11, 1959) is an American former professional football player who was a wide receiver in the National Football League (NFL) for the Green Bay Packers from 1982 to 1988 and the New York Jets in 1989. He played college football for the TCU Horned Frogs.

One of his more memorable catches was a 1985 game against the Minnesota Vikings in which he caught a pass from Lynn Dickey on the 21-yard line. His momentum from contact with a Vikings defender caused him to nearly fall out of bounds and he attempted to hop on one foot along the sidelines for nearly 15 yards to score the touchdown but was ruled out of bounds at the 5-yard line. The Packers scored a touchdown on the drive and won 27–17.

Epps was also a world class sprinter. His personal best of 20.19 seconds in the 200 meters was the second fastest time in the world in 1982. He also competed in the 55 meters and 100 meters, posting personal bests of 6.08 seconds and 10.16 seconds.

Epps was an All-American for the TCU Horned Frogs track and field team, finishing 5th in the 200 meters at the 1982 NCAA Division I Outdoor Track and Field Championships and 1983 NCAA Division I Outdoor Track and Field Championships.

== NFL career statistics ==
Legend
**Bold**	Career high

=== Regular season ===
Year	Team	Games		Receiving				
Year	Team	GP	GS	Rec	Yds	Avg	Lng	TD
1982	GNB	9	1	10	226	**22.6**	50	2
1983	GNB	**16**	0	18	313	17.4	45	0
1984	GNB	**16**	4	26	435	16.7	56	3
1985	GNB	**16**	**16**	44	**683**	15.5	**63**	3
1986	GNB	12	12	**49**	612	12.5	53	**4**
1987	GNB	10	9	34	516	15.2	40	2
1988	GNB	6	3	11	99	9.0	25	0
1989	NYJ	10	0	8	108	13.5	21	0
		95	45	200	2,992	15.0	63	14

=== Playoffs ===
Year	Team	Games		Receiving				
Year	Team	GP	GS	Rec	Yds	Avg	Lng	TD
1982	GNB	2	0	1	16	16.0	16	0
		2	0	1	16	16.0	16	0
