= James Lofton =

American football player and coach (born 1956)

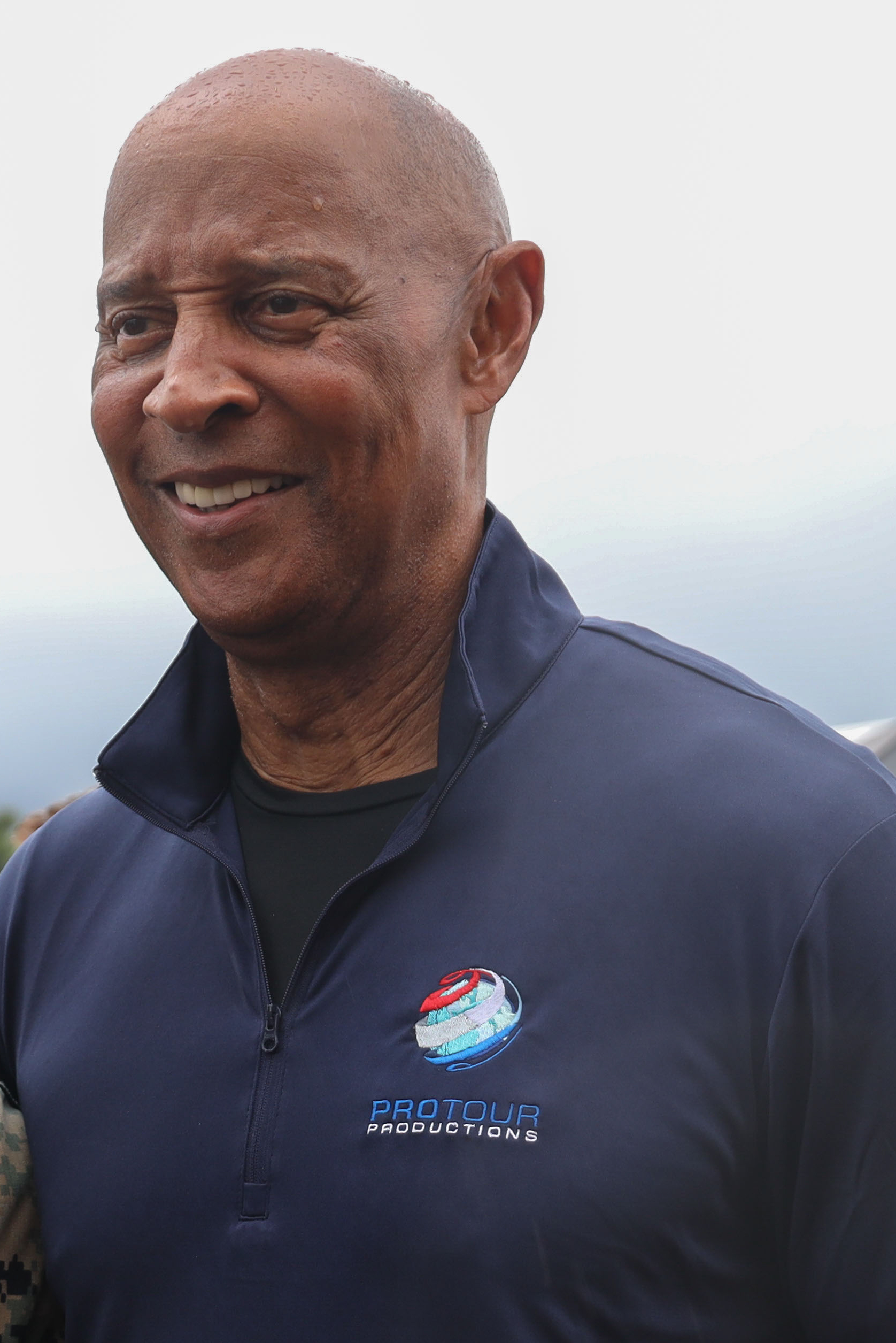
- Lofton in 2025

No. 80, 86, 22
- Position: Wide receiver

Personal information
- Born: July 5, 1956 (age 70); Fort Ord, California, U.S.
- Listed height: 6 ft 3 in (1.91 m)
- Listed weight: 192 lb (87 kg)

Career information
- High school: Washington (Los Angeles, California)
- College: Stanford (1974–1977)
- NFL draft: 1978: 1st round, 6th overall pick

Career history

Playing
- Green Bay Packers (1978–1986); Los Angeles Raiders (1987–1988); Buffalo Bills (1989–1992); Los Angeles Rams (1993); Philadelphia Eagles (1993)

Coaching
- San Diego Chargers (2002–2007) Wide receivers coach; Oakland Raiders (2008) Wide receivers coach

Awards and highlights
- 2× First-team All-Pro (1980, 1981); 2× Second-team All-Pro (1982, 1983); 8× Pro Bowl (1978, 1980–1985, 1991); NFL 1980s All-Decade Team; PFWA All-Rookie Team (1978); Green Bay Packers Hall of Fame; Buffalo Bills 50th Anniversary Team; Second-team All-American (1977); First-team All-Pac-8 (1977)

Career NFL statistics
- Receptions: 764
- Receiving yards: 14,004
- Receiving touchdowns: 75
- Stats at Pro Football Reference
- Pro Football Hall of Fame

James David Lofton (born July 5, 1956) is an American former professional football player, coach, and sportscaster. He played in the National Football League (NFL) as a wide receiver for the Green Bay Packers (1978–1986), Los Angeles Raiders (1987–1988), Buffalo Bills (1989–1992), Los Angeles Rams (1993), and Philadelphia Eagles (1993). He was also the NCAA champion in the long jump in 1978 while attending Stanford University.

Widely regarded as one of the greatest wide receivers of all time, Lofton retired with the most receiving yards in NFL history and was inducted into the Pro Football Hall of Fame in 2003. After his playing career ended, he became a wide receivers coach for the San Diego Chargers and Oakland Raiders.

== Early life ==
Lofton prepped at George Washington High School in Los Angeles, California, where he played quarterback and safety.

== College career ==
Lofton played college football at Stanford University. As a senior in 1977, he received 57 passes for 1,010 yards (17.72 yards per reception average) with 14 touchdowns, and was an AP & NEA second-team All-American selection. Lofton was a member of Theta Delta Chi fraternity, and earned a bachelor's degree in industrial engineering in 1978.

=== Track and field ===
Lofton won the long jump at the 1978 NCAA Track and Field Championships with a wind-aided jump of 26 feet 11¾ inches. He won the long jump at the 1974 CIF California State Meet with a jump of 24 feet 3½ inches after placing sixth in this meet the year before. He was also a sprinter of note, with a best of 20.5 in the 200 meter. He has been an active participant in Masters track and field since 1997.

== Professional career ==
Lofton was drafted in the first round (sixth overall) of the 1978 NFL draft by the Green Bay Packers. He was named to the NFL Pro Bowl eight times (seven with the Packers, one with the Bills). He was also named to four All-Pro teams. He also played in three Super Bowls during his career with the Bills. Lofton was inducted into the Pro Football Hall of Fame in 2003 and is the first Packers player not associated with Curly Lambeau or Vince Lombardi to be inducted.

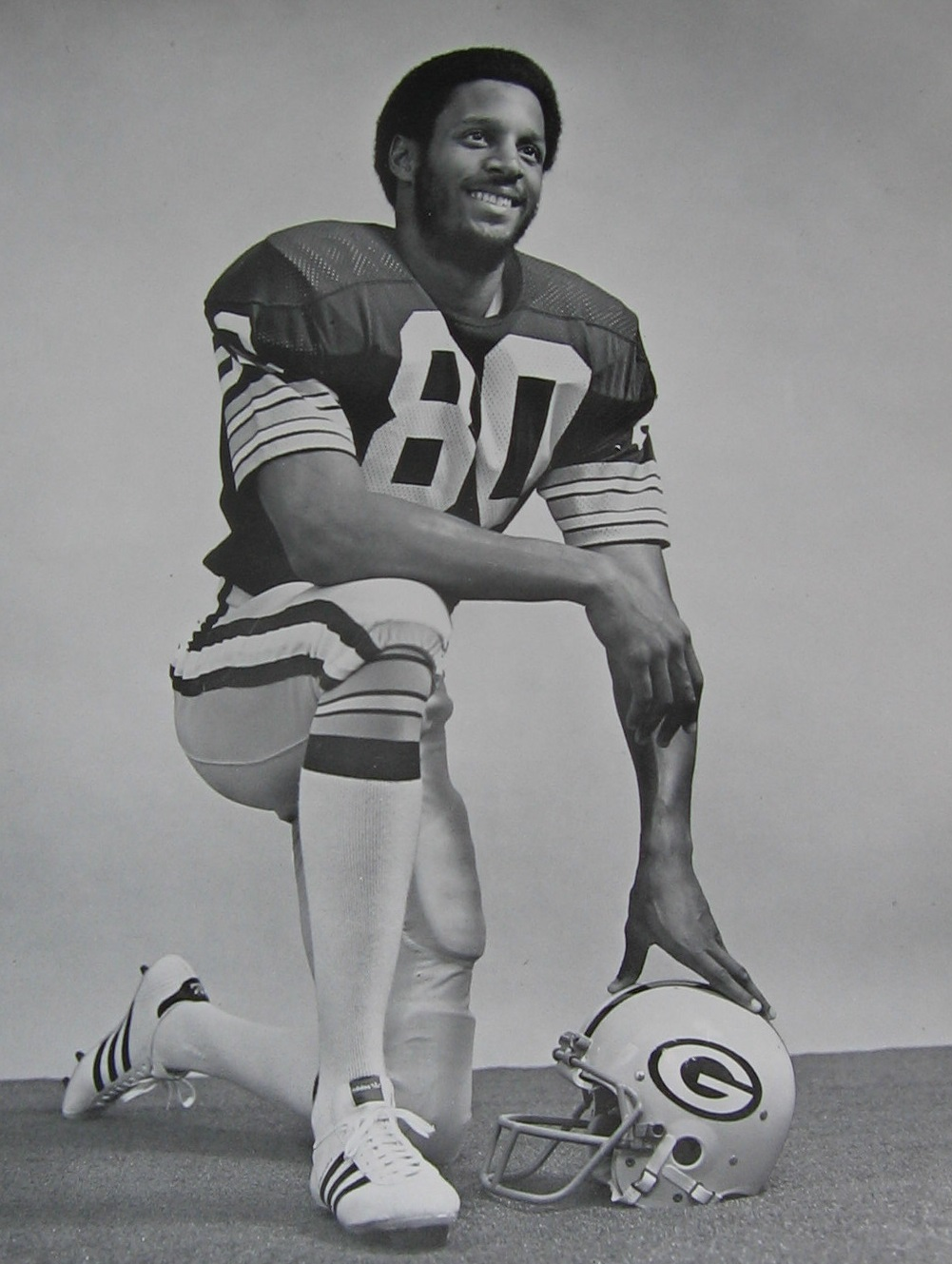
Lofton on the Green Bay Packers

In his 16 NFL seasons, Lofton caught 764 passes for 14,004 yards and 75 touchdowns. He averaged 20 yards per catch or more in five seasons, leading the league in 1983 and 1984 with an average of 22.4 and 22 yards respectively. He also rushed 32 times for 246 yards and one touchdown.

Lofton is the first NFL player to record 14,000 yards receiving and was the second (one game after Drew Hill) to score a touchdown in the 1970s, 1980s, and 1990s. During his nine seasons in Green Bay, Lofton played in seven Pro Bowls and left as the team's all-time leading receiver with 9,656 yards (since broken by Donald Driver). On April 13, 1987, he was traded for two draft picks to the Raiders in the wake of his charge for second degree sexual assault. A month later, he was found not guilty by Brown County Circuit Court jury. Two mediocre seasons (a combined 69 catches in 28 games) with the Raiders followed before he was signed as a free agent by Buffalo in 1989. He was to sign a two-year deal with Oakland in 1993 but instead joined the Los Angeles Rams, where he played just one game before finishing the season with Philadelphia.

On the retirement of Steve Largent, Lofton became the NFL's active leader in receiving yards at the start of 1990, through to his retirement in 1993. In 1991, Lofton became the oldest player to record 1,000 receiving yards in a season (since broken by Jerry Rice). On October 21, of that same year, Lofton became the oldest player to record 200 yards receiving as well as 200 yards from scrimmage in a game (35 years, 108 days). He is also the 2nd oldest player to have 200+ all-purpose yards in a game behind Mel Gray, (35 years, 204 days). He was inducted into the Green Bay Packers Hall of Fame in 1999.

== Coaching career ==
Lofton became the wide receiver coach for the San Diego Chargers in 2002 and continued that role until he was fired on January 22, 2008. Early in his coaching career, Lofton watched Robert Woods in a high school track meet, he noted that he would be an incredible NFL prospect. In 2005 at the NFL draft, Lofton played catch with Desean Jackson, noting he was going to be an excellent deep ball threat. Lofton was later announced as a candidate to become head coach for Oakland Raiders in 2007 but the job would later go to Lane Kiffin. In 2008, the Raiders hired him as their wide receivers coach. On January 13, 2009, Lofton was let go by the Raiders and replaced by Sanjay Lal.

== Broadcasting career ==
Lofton served as a color analyst and sideline reporter for NFL coverage on Westwood One radio from 1999 to 2001. In 2009, he re-joined the network to team with Dave Sims and later Kevin Kugler on Sunday Night Football broadcasts. He moved to a television position on the NFL on CBS in 2017, replacing the departing Solomon Wilcots. Lofton departed CBS after the 2023 season.

== NFL career statistics ==
=== Regular season ===
Year	Team	Games		Receiving				
Year	Team	GP	GS	Rec	Yds	Avg	Lng	TD
1978	GB	16	16	46	818	17.8	58	6
1979	GB	16	16	54	968	17.9	52	4
1980	GB	16	16	71	1,226	17.3	47	4
1981	GB	16	16	71	1,294	18.2	75	8
1982	GB	9	9	35	696	19.9	80	4
1983	GB	16	16	58	1,300	22.4	74	8
1984	GB	16	16	62	1,361	22.0	79	7
1985	GB	16	16	69	1,153	16.7	56	4
1986	GB	15	15	64	840	13.1	36	4
1987	RAI	12	12	41	880	21.5	49	5
1988	RAI	16	16	28	549	19.6	57	0
1989	BUF	12	2	8	166	20.8	47	3
1990	BUF	16	14	35	712	20.3	71	4
1991	BUF	15	15	57	1,072	18.8	77	8
1992	BUF	16	15	51	786	15.4	50	6
1993	LAR	1	0	1	16	16.0	16	0
1993	PHI	9	2	13	167	12.8	32	0
Career		233	212	764	14,004	18.3	80	75

== Personal life ==
Lofton and his wife Beverly have three children including David who also played college football at Stanford. Lofton's cousin, Kevin Bass, was a Major League Baseball player.

In October 1984, a dancer at the Marquee Club in Milwaukee accused James Lofton and his Packers teammate Eddie Lee Ivery of sexual assault. Lofton and Ivery asserted that the acts were consensual. Neither player ended up being charged in the incident due to a lack of evidence. Two years later, Lofton was charged with second-degree sexual assault following an incident in the stairwell of a Green Bay nightclub. He was found not guilty of that charge.
