= Mike Moffitt =

American football player (born 1963)

No. 82
- Position: Wide receiver

Personal information
- Born: July 28, 1963; Los Angeles, California
- Listed height: 6 ft 4 in (1.93 m)
- Listed weight: 215 lb (98 kg)

Career information
- College: Fresno State
- NFL draft: 1986: undrafted

Career history
- Green Bay Packers (1986)
- Stats at Pro Football Reference

Michael Jerome Moffitt (born July 28, 1963) is a former tight end in the National Football League. Born in Los Angeles, California, United States, Moffitt played at the collegiate level at California State University, Fresno. He played for the Green Bay Packers during the 1986 NFL season. In 2000, he began working for Indiana Wesleyan University in Marion, Indiana, and by 2012 he served as the Special Assistant to the President for Community Relations.
