= Charles Martin (American football) =

American gridiron football player (born 1959)

No. 94
- Position: Defensive end

Personal information
- Born: August 31, 1959; Canton, Georgia, U.S.
- Died: January 23, 2005 (aged 45); Houston, Texas, U.S.

Career information
- High school: Cherokee High School (Canton, Georgia)
- College: Western Carolina; Livingston

Career history
- Birmingham Stallions (1983); Edmonton Eskimos (1984); Green Bay Packers (1984–1987); Houston Oilers (1987); Atlanta Falcons (1988)

Awards and highlights
- Gulf South Conference Defensive Player of the Year (1982)

Career statistics
- Sacks: 11
- Fumble recoveries: 3
- Stats at Pro Football Reference

Charles Martin (August 31, 1959 – January 23, 2005) was an American football defensive end who played in the National Football League (NFL) for five seasons, primarily with the Green Bay Packers. He began his professional career on the Birmingham Stallions of the United States Football League (USFL) in 1983 and also played in the Canadian Football League (CFL) for the Edmonton Eskimos before joining the Packers. Following his Green Bay tenure from 1984 to 1987, he was a member of the Houston Oilers and Atlanta Falcons until his 1988 retirement.

Due to a late hit on Chicago Bears quarterback Jim McMahon in 1986, Martin became the first modern NFL player to have a multi-game suspension for an on-field incident. The incident also made Martin the first NFL player ejected for a violent act not part of the game, setting an NFL precedent.

== Early career ==
Martin attended Cherokee High School in Canton, Georgia and was nicknamed "Too Mean" for his tendency to pile on ball carriers after the whistle. He originally dropped out of school at age 14 but then rejoined to play football. He initially signed to play college football at Western Carolina, but followed assistant coach Joe D'Alessandris to Livingston University. At Livingston, he was a Division II All-American, twice received All-Gulf South Conference, and was the Defensive Player of the Year in 1982.

== Professional career ==
=== Birmingham Stallions ===
Martin began his pro football career with the Birmingham Stallions of the USFL in 1983, but was cut after his first season.

=== Edmonton Eskimos ===
Martin was signed by the Edmonton Eskimos of the Canadian Football League in early 1984, but was cut before he could make it through a season.

=== Green Bay Packers ===
Martin immediately jumped into a starting role once he was signed by the Green Bay Packers. He signed with the Packers after he was not selected in the Supplemental Draft.

==== 1986 McMahon incident ====
On November 23, 1986, in week 12 of the 1986 NFL season, the 10–2 Chicago Bears met the 2–10 Packers in a regular season game. During pre-game warm-ups, Martin displayed a white hand-towel with a list of five Bears offensive players' numbers: 9 for Jim McMahon, 34 for Walter Payton, 83 for Willie Gault, 63 for Jay Hilgenberg and 29 for Dennis Gentry. Martin wore the towel during the game, and allegedly claimed that it was a hit-list. On a third down play, Bears quarterback McMahon threw an interception down the field to Mark Lee. After the interception, Martin grabbed McMahon from behind and body-slammed him shoulder first to the ground. McMahon landed full force on his previously injured shoulder, a situation exacerbated by Soldier Field's artificial turf surface of the time. Referee Jerry Markbreit considered himself lucky to have seen Martin's hit at all, given his attention was supposed to have been directed downfield at the site of the interception. After Martin's action, Bears offensive lineman Jim Covert retaliated against Martin with a late hit of his own, and two offsetting flags were thrown. Markbreit explained what happened next,

After the play, I took a hold of Martin's arm and said, ‘Ninety-four, you're out of game. I'm ejecting you.' And he pulled away and said, ‘I'm not going anywhere with you.' I looked at him and, tongue-in-cheek, I said, ‘If you don't come with me, I'm going to let the Bears kill you.' He said, ‘Let's go.'

Markbreit walked to the Packers sideline and told coach Forrest Gregg "This man is ejected from the game." Bears coach Mike Ditka ran out onto the field demanding an explanation for two flags having been thrown. The officials decided to pick up the flag for Covert's late hit and penalize only Martin and the Packers, given the egregiousness of the hit. Markbreit said, in a 2012 interview, "it was the most violent act of its day."

Martin was ejected from the game and further suspended for two games. The ejection set a precedent that any violent act that is not considered part of the game is grounds for ejection from a game. McMahon, who was already playing with a rotator cuff tear, suffered further damage requiring surgery, which kept him out of competition for the rest of the 1986 season. After the game, the Packers defensive coordinator initially defended Martin, saying "We tell people that if we intercept a pass, go get anybody near you." This was the first multi-game suspension for an on-field incident in modern NFL history.

Martin played for the Packers from 1984–1987. He was cut early in the 1987 season after being implicated in a Green Bay bar fight.

=== Houston Oilers ===
Martin played for the Oilers in the latter part of the 1987 season. In a game against the Pittsburgh Steelers, Martin speared Steelers running back Earnest Jackson, sparking a rivalry between Oilers coach Jerry Glanville and Steelers coach Chuck Noll.

=== Atlanta Falcons ===
He closed out his career with the Falcons in 1988, the only season in which he did not start a game.

== Personal life ==
Martin was suspended two games in 1986 due to an incident at a bar. He later went into alcohol abuse treatment, and was twice divorced. He was arrested for disorderly conduct in 1987 for throwing an egg at the car of an NFL replacement player.

Martin died in 2005 at age 45 in Houston due to complications from kidney failure.
