= Brian Noble (American football) =

American football player (born 1962)

No. 91
- Position: Linebacker

Personal information
- Born: September 6, 1962 (age 64); Anaheim, California, U.S.
- Listed height: 6 ft 3.5 in (1.92 m)
- Listed weight: 252 lb (114 kg)

Career information
- High school: Anaheim (CA)
- College: Arizona State
- NFL draft: 1985: 5th round, 125th overall pick

Career history
- Green Bay Packers (1985–1993)

Awards and highlights
- PFWA All-Rookie Team (1985)

Career NFL statistics
- Sacks: 14
- Fumble recoveries: 11
- Interceptions: 3
- Stats at Pro Football Reference

Brian David Noble (born September 6, 1962) is an American former professional football player who was a linebacker in the National Football League (NFL). He was selected in the fifth round of the 1985 NFL draft by the Green Bay Packers. He played college football for the Arizona State Sun Devils.

== Early life and education ==
Noble attended Anaheim High School where he played football and baseball, and football at Fullerton College before attending Arizona State University. At Fullerton College he played football for head coach Hal Sherbeck, who he credits for setting him straight, and helping him to understand what it would take to be successful in football and life.

== Professional career ==
For the 1985 NFL draft, Noble was selected in the fifth round (125th overall) by the Green Bay Packers. By Week 2, he was starting at right inside linebacker and had an outstanding first season, recording 104 tackles with three sacks. For that, he was named to the Pro Football Writers Association’s NFL All-Rookie Team.

Noble shifted to right outside linebacker in 1986, but the following year he returned to the interior at left inside linebacker and had a career-high five fumble recoveries in the strike-shortened 1987. For the remainder of his career, Noble was settled in at inside linebacker and led the Packers in tackles in three out of four seasons (1986, 1987, and 1989). The only reason he missed out on the team tackles lead in 1988 was because he sat out the season’s first four games due to a contract dispute, and his holdout lasted 67 days but by his third week back, he had reclaimed his starting position. The following season, in a Week 9 game at Tampa Bay, Noble recovered a fumble from Buccaneers quarterback Chris Chandler and took it into the end zone for the only touchdown of his NFL career in a 27-0 Packers victory.

Noble had missed only four games due to injury leading up to the second week of the 1993 season when he tore ligaments in his right knee in a loss to Philadelphia. Diagnosed with a torn ACL, Noble was placed on injured reserve for the rest of the season and thus was denied the opportunity to play in his first playoff game as the Packers with Brett Favre and Reggie White began their rise to becoming an NFL powerhouse under head coach Mike Holmgren. In 117 career games, Noble was credited with 543 unassisted tackles.

== Post-football career ==
After retiring from the National Football League, Noble was hired by WBAY-TV in Green Bay on to produce his own outdoor television program called Hitting the Outdoors which aired throughout the Midwest, while also becoming a member of the station's telecast team during Packers preseason games. Noble also owned and operated a sports memorabilia and apparel business called “The Pro Image”, which was located in Kronenwetter, Wisconsin. He later owned the Green Bay Blizzard until October 2009, which played in the AF2. He and his wife Cindy are the co-founders of a 501(c)(3) corporation "A Noble Cause" for kids with cancer which raises money for children and their families dealing with cancer by selling multi-colored cancer awareness bracelets. Noble and his wife have four daughters, and as of June 11, 2008, the entire family lives in Las Vegas, Nevada, where he later became an assistant football coach at Coronado High School.
