= Larry Rubens =

American football player (born 1959)

No. 58, 51, 52
- Position: Center

Personal information
- Born: January 25, 1959 (age 67); Spokane, Washington, U.S.
- Listed height: 6 ft 2 in (1.88 m)
- Listed weight: 260 lb (118 kg)

Career information
- High school: Mead (Spokane)
- College: Montana State
- NFL draft: 1982: undrafted

Career history
- Green Bay Packers (1982–1983); Memphis Showboats (1984-1985); Chicago Bears (1986–1987)

Career NFL statistics
- Games played: 41
- Fumble recoveries: 1
- Stats at Pro Football Reference

Larry Rubens (born January 25, 1959) is an American former professional football player who was a center in the National Football League (NFL) and the United States Football League (USFL). He played college football for the Montana State Bobcats and was selected to the 1981 1AA Kodak All-American Football Team. He was also inducted into the 2010 Montana State Hall of Fame. After college he played two seasons with the Green Bay Packers in 1982 and 1983. He then played in the USFL for the Memphis Showboats as their starting center and then returned to the NFL with the Chicago Bears in 1986 and 1987.
