= Walter Stanley =

American football player (born 1962)

No. 87, 89, 85, 81, 80
- Position: Wide receiver

Personal information
- Born: November 5, 1962 (age 64); Chicago, Illinois, U.S.
- Listed height: 5 ft 9 in (1.75 m)
- Listed weight: 180 lb (82 kg)

Career information
- High school: South Shore (South Shore, Chicago)
- College: Colorado; Mesa State
- NFL draft: 1985: 4th round, 98th overall pick

Career history
- Green Bay Packers (1985–1989); Detroit Lions (1989); Washington Redskins (1990); Miami Dolphins (1991); San Diego Chargers (1992); New England Patriots (1992); Ottawa Rough Riders (1993–1994)

Career NFL statistics
- Receptions: 130
- Receiving yards: 2,213
- Return yards: 3,277
- Touchdowns: 6
- Stats at Pro Football Reference

Walter Stanley (born November 5, 1962) is an American former professional football player who was a wide receiver for 10 seasons in the National Football League (NFL) for the Green Bay Packers (1985–1988), the Detroit Lions (1989), the Washington Redskins (1990), the New England Patriots (1992), and the San Diego Chargers (1992). He played college football for the University of Colorado and Mesa State College and was selected in the fourth round of the 1985 NFL draft. He is a graduate of South Shore High School in Chicago. Stanley caught 130 passes during his pro career for 2,213 yards and five touchdowns.
