= Mike McCoy (cornerback) =

American football player (1953–2016)

No. 29
- Position: Cornerback

Personal information
- Born: August 16, 1953; West Memphis, Arkansas, U.S.
- Died: February 20, 2016 (aged 62); Thornton, Colorado, U.S.
- Listed height: 5 ft 11 in (1.80 m)
- Listed weight: 183 lb (83 kg)

Career information
- High school: West Memphis
- College: Colorado
- NFL draft: 1976: 3rd round, 72nd overall pick

Career history
- Green Bay Packers (1976–1984)

Career NFL statistics
- Interceptions: 13
- INT yards: 116
- Fumble recoveries: 5
- Stats at Pro Football Reference

Michael Charles McCoy (August 16, 1953 – February 20, 2016) was an American professional football player who was a cornerback in the National Football League (NFL). He was selected by the Green Bay Packers in the third round of the 1976 NFL draft. He played college football for the Colorado Buffaloes.

== Professional career ==
McCoy was selected by the Green Bay Packers in the third round of the 1976 NFL draft. He played his entire career for the Packers from 1976 to 1983. During his career he started 97 of 110 games and recorded 13 career interceptions.

== Death ==
McCoy died at the age of 62 on February 20, 2016. He had dementia and was in a care facility the last four years of his life.
