= Joe Shield =

American football player (born 1962)

No. 18
- Position: Quarterback

Personal information
- Born: June 26, 1962 (age 64); Brattleboro, Vermont, U.S.
- Listed height: 6 ft 1 in (1.85 m)
- Listed weight: 185 lb (84 kg)

Career information
- High school: Brattleboro Union (VT); Worcester Academy (MA)
- College: Trinity College
- NFL draft: 1985: 11th round, 294th overall pick

Career history
- Green Bay Packers (1985–1986); New England Patriots (1986)*
- * Offseason or practice squad member only

Career NFL statistics
- Games played: 3
- Stats at Pro Football Reference

Joe Shield (born June 26, 1962) is an American former professional football player in the National Football League (NFL). Shield attended Brattleboro Union High School before a brief stint at Worcester Academy. He participated in athletics at both schools, excelling in baseball and football. Shield attended Trinity College, where he played college football. After an injury to the team's starting quarterback in his first game, Shield took over the position and did not relinquish it for the rest of his college career. He left Trinity holding almost every team passing record. Shield was drafted by the Green Bay Packers in the 1985 NFL draft; he played in three games over two seasons for the Packers before leaving football.

== Early life ==
Joe Shield was born on June 26, 1962, in Brattleboro, Vermont, where he attended Brattleboro Union High School. During his time there, Shield played both baseball, basketball and football. In football, he was named the All-Southern Vermont League quarterback for his junior and senior years (1978 and 1979); in 1978 he helped lead the team to the state championship and in 1979 he was captain and named the team's most valuable player. In baseball, he had a career .400 batting average and helped lead the team to two consecutive appearances in the state championship game, winning in 1978. Shield won numerous awards for his athletic performance in high school. He then continued his education and participation in baseball and football at Worcester Academy in Massachusetts.

== College career ==
Shield attended Trinity College in Hartford, Connecticut, where he played quarterback for their football team. During his first college football game at Trinity, the team's starting quarterback was injured and Shield replaced him. He ended up retaining the position for the rest of his college career. Shield accumulated over 6,500 passing yards, completing over 56 percent of his passes and throwing 52 touchdowns as the team's starter for three seasons. The Hartford Courant noted that Shields held "nearly every record for a quarterback at Trinity" when he left.

== Professional career ==
Shield was drafted by the Green Bay Packers in the eleventh round of the 1985 NFL draft with the 294th overall pick. During the 1985 preseason, he battled Scott Brunner and Randy Wright for the back-up quarterback position behind Lynn Dickey. After Brunner was traded, Shield made the team as the third-string quarterback and suited up, but did not play, in the Packers' season opener against the New England Patriots. Over 100 people, including his family and friends, attended the game to support Shield. He was released by the Packers after the third game of the season when the team signed Jim Zorn. After his release, he had interest from the Patriots and a try-out for the Toronto Argonauts. He possibly was on the Argonauts for the rest of the year.

Shield entered the preseason on the Patriots, fighting for the third-string quarterback spot. During a preseason game, he suffered a leg injury and was placed on injured reserve. After being released by the Patriots in September, the Packers signed Shield a few months later. He played three games for the Packers during the 1986 NFL season, although he recorded no statistics. He was released during the offseason after the Packers acquired a few rookie quarterbacks. On September 17, 1987, Packers' Director of Football Operations Tom Braatz announced the team's intention of reaching out to Shield prior to the 1987 NFL season to inquire on his availability to play for the team in the event that NFL players went on strike. Six days later, Braatz stated that Shield declined, preferring the stability of working elsewhere. According to the Brattleboro Reformer, Shield was the first person from Vermont to be drafted into the NFL and then make a team's roster.

== Personal life ==
Since at least 1993, he has been working in the health informatics industry. He has been inducted into various halls of fame: Worcester Academy Athletic Hall of Fame in 2017; Trinity College's Athletic Hall of Fame in 2019; Brattleboro Union High School's Athletic Hall of Fame in 2020; and the Vermont Principals' Association Hall of Fame in 2023.
