= Mark Cannon (American football) =

American football player (born 1962)

No. 58, 70
- Position: Center

Personal information
- Born: June 14, 1962 (age 64); Whittier, California, U.S.
- Listed height: 6 ft 3 in (1.91 m)
- Listed weight: 258 lb (117 kg)

Career information
- High school: Stephen F. Austin (Austin, Texas)
- College: Texas–Arlington
- NFL draft: 1984: 11th round, 294th overall pick

Career history
- Green Bay Packers (1984–1989); Kansas City Chiefs (1989); Indianapolis Colts (1991)

Career NFL statistics
- Games played: 83
- Games started: 51
- Fumble recoveries: 2
- Stats at Pro Football Reference

Mark Maida Cannon (born June 14, 1962) is an American former professional football player who played eight seasons in the National Football League (NFL). He was an offensive lineman for the Green Bay Packers, Kansas City Chiefs, and Indianapolis Colts. Prior to his professional career, he played college football at the University of Texas at Arlington.
