= Ezra Johnson =

American football player (born 1955)

No. 90, 78
- Position: Defensive end

Personal information
- Born: October 2, 1955 (age 71); Shreveport, Louisiana, U.S.
- Listed height: 6 ft 4 in (1.93 m)
- Listed weight: 240 lb (109 kg)

Career information
- High school: Green Oaks (Shreveport)
- College: Morris Brown
- NFL draft: 1977: 1st round, 28th overall pick

Career history
- Green Bay Packers (1977–1987); Indianapolis Colts (1988–1989); Houston Oilers (1990–1991)

Awards and highlights
- Pro Bowl (1978); Green Bay Packers Hall of Fame

Career NFL statistics
- Sacks: 96
- Fumble recoveries: 8
- Stats at Pro Football Reference

Ezra Ray Johnson (born October 2, 1955) is an American former professional football player who was a defensive end for 15 seasons with the Green Bay Packers, Indianapolis Colts and Houston Oilers in the National Football League (NFL) from 1977 to 1991.

A first-round pick from Morris Brown College by the Green Bay Packers in 1977, Johnson was known as one of the best defensive linemen in his first few years in the league. Johnson earned a spot in the 1979 Pro Bowl after unofficially finishing second, to Detroit Lions Al "Bubba" Baker, with 20.5 sacks in 1978. (Quarterback sacks were not an official NFL statistic until 1982.) However, by 1981, Johnson's career was marred by a series of back injuries and allegations of his lack of discipline on the field, including one incident in which he ate a hot dog while sitting on the bench during a preseason game, and being inconsistent at times. He lost and regained his starting job multiple times during that period.

Johnson was exclusively used as the third-down pass rush specialist after 1986, and took a leadership role with the team. He was released by the Packers in 1988 and played with two seasons with the Colts, and one with the Oilers before retiring in 1991. Despite his adverse relationship with the team at times, Johnson was elected to the Green Bay Packers Hall of Fame in 1997.

== College career ==
Johnson played college football at Morris Brown College in Atlanta. In his last year at Morris Brown he had 112 tackles and 28 sacks. However his size and the small school he played for helped lower his draft stock. He was projected to go anywhere from the first to fourth rounds prior to the NFL draft.

== Professional career ==
=== Green Bay Packers ===
Johnson was drafted as the 28th pick of the first round in the 1977 NFL draft by the Green Bay Packers. Johnson was considered a "gamble pick" for the Packers because of lack of major college experience and his relatively small size for a defensive end. In his rookie season, Johnson appeared in 14 games as the backup for Alden Roche at defensive end. Johnson significantly improved in his second year, becoming one of the top defensive ends in the league with his explosiveness off the snap and his speed, a 4.5 in the 40-yard dash, being the main factors for his success. He thrived on the Packers 4–3 defense, and recorded 14 sacks by the eighth game of the season. Johnson had two sacks and forced two fumbles in a 45–28 win against the Seattle Seahawks on October 16, 1978. At that time, the Packers had the best record in the NFC Central at 6–1. By the end of the year, Johnson recorded an unofficial 20.5 sacks, a statistic used, but not kept, by the NFL until 1982. However, the Packers offense were among the worst in the league, and the team lost a chance for a playoff berth in the final game of the season against the Los Angeles Rams. Johnson was rewarded for his efforts by being selected to play in the Pro Bowl and was rewarded with the Packers Defensive Player of the Year award.

In 1979, Johnson missed seven games early in the season because of a sprained left ankle. On his return against the Minnesota Vikings on November 11, he sacked quarterback Tommy Kramer four times in a 19–7 win. During that period, Johnson teamed up with fellow first-round pick Mike Butler to form one of the league's most potent defensive lineups. Nicknamed the "Gang Green", they became known for their ability to pressure the quarterback to force a sack.

Johnson was notoriously fined $1,000 and required by then-general manager–head coach Bart Starr to apologize for eating a hot dog on the sidelines during the fourth quarter of a 38–0 Packers' home preseason loss to the Denver Broncos on August 30, 1980. Starr gave Johnson back the $1,000 at the end of the year. However, defensive line coach Fred von Appen resigned five days after the incident because Starr refused to suspend Johnson. He started in all 15 games that season, as the Packers finished with a 5–10–1 record. After the season, Johnson and Butler were both criticized for not playing up to the Packers expectations when they drafted them. One journalist stated that their development was halted because of a lack of stability in the Green Bay coaching situation, who went through four defensive line coaches in three years.

In 1981, Johnson lost his starting role to Casey Merrill as the Packers had changed to a 3–4 defensive scheme, and decided instead to use Johnson exclusively for pass rushing situations. It was a decision which confused the local media as Johnson had been the starter since 1978. Merrill, who was released by the Cincinnati Bengals and claimed off waivers by the Packers, was considered by the team as the better, more consistent interior lineman against the run. The Packers claimed Johnson lost his job because of his lack of "size" and low upside. However, during the preseason, many people within the Packers organization "questioned" Johnson's desire to play and his attitude, an allegation Johnson quickly denied. He also was fined by Starr an unknown amount of money for almost missing a team flight to New York after celebrating his birthday the previous night, misplacing his car keys. He only started three games that season.

By 1982, Johnson regained his starting job over Merrill. Defensive coordinator John Meyer stated that Johnson was "playing his best football" since his breakout 1978 season. Johnson stated that "eating his mother's cooking" and being "healthy" were the main reasons for his improvement. He signed a three-year contract with the Packers at $450,000 a year. It led to a lawsuit against his former agency Bradcor Sports Servicing, who claimed that he never gave the agency their commission. He had an official career best of 14.5 quarterback sacks in 1983 along with 107 tackles, a team record by a defensive lineman in a single season.

The success didn't last long, as Johnson started to get hampered with back injuries, which reduced his effectiveness. In 1984, Johnson had surgery for a herniated disk, an injury he suffered during training camp, and was known as a potential career-ending injury. He missed the first game of the regular season against the St. Louis Cardinals and could not fully recover from the injury. Again he lost his starting job, becoming a third-down pass-rushing specialist, and was credited with seven sacks for the year; the injury forced Johnson to mull retirement.

Prior to the start of training camp for the 1985 season, Johnson had a second surgery to repair his herniated disk. At the same time, Johnson took on a leadership role for the Green Bay defense, and started to accept his role as a backup and started to mentor the younger players. After injuries befell the Packers' defensive line, Johnson regained his starting position at defensive end. He started all 16 games that year, achieving 9.5 sacks. His career started to diminish after that season. In 1986, Johnson was credited with three and a half sacks as he was used as the designated third-down pass rushing specialist. He injured his right knee in 1987, missing 10 of the first 11 games of the season. He was released by the Packers on January 8, 1988. At the time of his release, Johnson was the Packers' all-time leader in sacks with 84.

=== Indianapolis and Houston ===
Johnson signed with the Indianapolis Colts in 1988 in order to provide experience to a young and inexperienced Colts squad. During his time with the Colts, Johnson was used as a part-time starter in a role similar to his final few years with the Packers. He played in ten games that year, recording three sacks and played in all 16 games the following year, recording 8.5 sacks. He joined the Houston Oilers in 1990, where he played in all 16 games, starting three, and was credited with 2.5 sacks. After playing two games for the Oilers in 1991, Johnson retired.

He played in 192 games in his career, having officially 55.5 quarterback sacks (99 when his unofficial totals are added).

== Life after football ==
After retirement Johnson coached at Morris Brown and at Morehouse College. He was elected to the Green Bay Packers Hall of Fame in 1997. He currently lives in the Atlanta area and has four children.
