= Donnie Humphrey =

American football player (1961–2014)

No. 79
- Positions: Nose tackle, defensive end

Personal information
- Born: April 20, 1961; Huntsville, Alabama, U.S.
- Died: September 1, 2014 (aged 53); Yucca Valley, California, U.S.
- Listed height: 6 ft 3 in (1.91 m)
- Listed weight: 282 lb (128 kg)

Career information
- High school: J. O. Johnson (Huntsville)
- College: Auburn
- NFL draft: 1984: 3rd round, 72nd overall pick

Career history
- Green Bay Packers (1984–1986)

Awards and highlights
- Second-team All-American (1983); First-team All-SEC (1983); Second-team All-SEC (1981)

Career NFL statistics
- Sacks: 3
- Fumble recoveries: 1
- Stats at Pro Football Reference

Donnie Ray Humphrey (April 20, 1961 – September 1, 2014) was an American professional football player who was a nose tackle and defensive end in the National Football League (NFL).

Born and raised in Huntsville, Alabama, Humphrey played high school football at J. O. Johnson High School. He played college football for the Auburn Tigers, from 1979 to 1983. As a senior, he was named a second-team All-American defensive lineman by United Press International (UPI).

Humphrey was selected in the third round of the 1984 NFL draft by the Green Bay Packers He spent three seasons with the Packers, appearing in all 48 games, and recorded three career sacks.

Humphrey's daughter, Tasha Humphrey, played in the WNBA.

Humphrey died on September 1, 2014, at his Yucca Valley, California, home after an unspecified brief illness.
