= Ken Stills =

American football player and coach (born 1963)

No. 29, 27
- Position: Safety

Personal information
- Born: September 6, 1963 (age 63); Oceanside, California, U.S.
- Listed height: 5 ft 10 in (1.78 m)
- Listed weight: 185 lb (84 kg)

Career information
- High school: El Camino (Oceanside)
- College: Wisconsin
- NFL draft: 1985: 8th round, 209th overall pick

Career history
- Green Bay Packers (1985–1989); Minnesota Vikings (1990)

Career NFL statistics
- Interceptions: 7
- Sacks: 1
- Touchdowns: 1
- Stats at Pro Football Reference

Kenneth Lee Stills Sr. (born September 6, 1963) is an American former professional football player who was a safety in the National Football League (NFL). He played college football for the Wisconsin Badgers. He is the father of American football wide receiver Kenny Stills.

Stills was selected by the Green Bay Packers in the eighth round of the 1985 NFL draft. He played college football at Wisconsin. His first start in the NFL came against the Chicago Bears, the Packers' most hated rivals during the 1980s, and he memorably cost his team a 15-yard penalty for shoving Matt Suhey at the line of scrimmage. Stills also played for the Minnesota Vikings for one season before retiring.

He was a former head coach for the River City Rage of the United Indoor Football and running backs coach for the Los Angeles Xtreme of the XFL. He was also formerly the running backs coach at IMG Academy. Stills is currently the Head Football Coach at Bishop McLaughlin Catholic High School in Pasco County, Florida.

Like many former NFL players of the 1980s, Stills lives with the physical effects from playing in an era which emphasized defense and had far fewer limitations on tackling. Nearly twenty years after retiring from the NFL, he suffered five slipped disks in his spine, causing his left hand to be permanently numb.

Stills has four children from two marriages. His older son Kenny played collegiately for Oklahoma, was selected by the New Orleans Saints in the 2013 NFL draft and was last with the New Orleans Saints in September 2021.
