= Byron Braggs =

American football player (born 1959)

No. 73, 71
- Position: Defensive end

Personal information
- Born: October 10, 1959 (age 67); Montgomery, Alabama, U.S.
- Listed height: 6 ft 6 in (1.98 m)
- Listed weight: 290 lb (132 kg)

Career information
- High school: Carver (Montgomery)
- College: Alabama
- NFL draft: 1981: 5th round, 117th overall pick

Career history
- Green Bay Packers (1981–1983); Tampa Bay Buccaneers (1984)

Awards and highlights
- 2× National champion (1978, 1979); First-team All-SEC (1980); Second-team All-SEC (1979)

Career NFL statistics
- Games played–started: 55–14
- Sacks: 5.5
- Fumble recoveries: 2
- Stats at Pro Football Reference

Byron Charles Braggs (born October 10, 1959) is an American former professional football player who was a defensive end in the National Football League (NFL) for the Green Bay Packers (1981–1983) and the Tampa Bay Buccaneers (1984). He played college football for the Alabama Crimson Tide.

== Early life ==
Braggs grew up in Montgomery, Alabama, in the south-central part of the state. He attended and played football at George Washington Carver High School in Montgomery, graduating in 1977. Braggs was the first African American to win the "Jimmy Hitchcock Award", named in honor of Auburn University's All-American football player, who also was a native of Montgomery.

== College career ==
Braggs attended and played college football at the University of Alabama in Tuscaloosa, Alabama, for the legendary coach Paul "Bear" Bryant from 1977 to 1980. While playing for the Crimson Tide, Braggs was twice named All-Southeastern Conference (1979 and 1980), and All-American (1979 and 1980). Braggs played on Alabama's 1978 and 1979 National Championship teams. He had two quarterback sacks in the 1979 Sugar Bowl win over Penn State. Braggs experienced a heat stroke after an Alabama football practice in which he passed out and his body temperature reached 105 degrees, an incident which is credited with changing Alabama's practices regarding the provision of water. Braggs earned a B.A. degree in Broadcast and Film Communications (1982), and a M.A. degree in Education (1989).

== Professional career ==
Braggs entered the NFL as a fifth-round draft choice of the Green Bay Packers in the 1981 NFL draft as a defensive lineman. Braggs finished his NFL career with the Tampa Bay Buccaneers.

== After football ==
Braggs worked as a Criminal Investigator/Special Agent for the U.S. Customs Service. Subsequently that entity became a part of the Department of Homeland of Security, Immigration and Customs Enforcement (ICE). Braggs served as the Acting Chief Intelligence Officer for the Washington DC field office. Braggs retired from ICE in October 2016. Braggs is a gold life member of the Sterling (VA) Fire Company, where rouse through the ranks and retired at the rank of Lieutenant. Today, Braggs is married and lives in the metropolitan Washington, D.C. area and is a Life Member of Kappa Alpha Psi fraternity, and participates with various civic, social and charitable organizations.
