= Eddie Garcia (American football) =

American football player (1960–2025)

No. 11
- Position: Placekicker

Personal information
- Born: April 15, 1960; New Orleans, Louisiana, U.S.
- Died: June 5, 2025 (aged 65); Poygan, Wisconsin, U.S.
- Listed height: 5 ft 8 in (1.73 m)
- Listed weight: 178 lb (81 kg)

Career information
- High school: Woodrow Wilson (East Dallas, Texas)
- College: SMU (1978–1981)
- NFL draft: 1982: 10th round, 264th overall pick

Career history
- Green Bay Packers (1982–1984); Miami Dolphins (1985)*; Tampa Bay Buccaneers (1986)*
- * Offseason or practice squad member only

Awards and highlights
- Second-team All-American (1981); First-team All-SWC (1980)

Career NFL statistics
- Field goals: 3
- Field goal attempts: 9
- Field goal %: 33.3
- Longest field goal: 51
- Stats at Pro Football Reference

Edgar Ivan Garcia (April 15, 1960 – June 5, 2025) was an American professional football player who was a placekicker in the National Football League (NFL). He played college football for the SMU Mustangs, earning second-team All-American honors in 1981. Garcia was selected by the Green Bay Packers in the 10th round of the 1982 NFL draft. He played two seasons for the Packers, before two brief stints with the Miami Dolphins and Tampa Bay Buccaneers.

== Early life and college career ==
Garcia was born on April 15, 1960, in New Orleans, Louisiana. He moved to Dallas, Texas, as a child and grew up playing soccer. He was a member of the Dallas Jets U16 soccer team that won the U.S. Southern Regional championship. He attended Wilson High School where he played football as a soccer-style placekicker. After high school, he decided to play college football for the SMU Mustangs. Garcia played for the Mustangs from 1978 to 1981, lettering all four years.

As a sophomore in 1979, Garcia was the Mustangs' leading scorer with 50 points, converting 8 of 14 field goal attempts and 24 of 26 extra points. He was the team's scoring leader again in 1980 with 57 points, after converting 11 of 21 field goals and 34 of 34 extra points. He also led the Southwest Conference (SWC) in scoring in 1980. As a senior in 1981, he was named second-team All-American by the Associated Press (AP) after converting 18 of 22 field goals and 37 of 40 extra points. Garcia was second in the SWC in scoring that season, behind his teammate Eric Dickerson. He concluded his collegiate career with an SMU-record 44 field goals made, as well as 130 extra points; he remains fifth in school history in points as of 2024. He was invited to the 1982 Senior Bowl where he made a 55-yard field goal.

Garcia graduated from SMU's Cox School of Business in 1982 with a Bachelor of Business Administration (BBA).

== Professional career ==
Garcia was selected by the Green Bay Packers in the 10th round (264th overall) of the 1982 NFL draft. He described being selected by the Packers as a "total shock", due to the team already having future Pro Football Hall of Famer Jan Stenerud at the position. Packers special teams coach Dick Rehbein explained the team drafted him due to his abilities as a kickoff specialist and described him as a "steal" in the 10th round. He impressed in preseason, making a 50-yard field goal in an exhibition game against the Los Angeles Raiders. Garcia initially made the team's final roster along with Stenerud, but he suffered a groin injury and was placed on injured reserve on September 15, ending his season without having appeared in a game.

The next season, Garcia battled the 40-year-old Stenerud for the Packers' kicking job. Garcia made a 55-yard field goal in preseason, setting the then-record for longest kick at Lambeau Field, and the Packers decided to keep both kickers. In the fifth game of the season, he replaced Stenerud for kickoffs, while Stenerud remained the kicker for field goals and extra points. Garcia ended up playing in 12 games during the 1983 season, solely being used on kickoffs.

Prior to the 1984 season, Stenerud was traded by the Packers to the Minnesota Vikings, putting Garcia in a position to be the team's next kicker. In the first game of the 1984 season, he made one of two field goals and all three extra points. However, he struggled in subsequent games, missing his only field goal attempt in week 3 and missing both a field goal and an extra point in week 4. He then made two of three field goals against the Tampa Bay Buccaneers, including a career long 51-yarder, as well as all three extra point attempts. After missing both field goal attempts in a 17–14 loss to the Denver Broncos in week 7, he was placed on injured reserve and replaced by Al Del Greco. Garcia was released on November 13, concluding the 1984 season having made only three of nine field goal attempts, as well as 14 of 15 extra point attempts, in seven games played.

Garcia signed with the Miami Dolphins on March 20, 1985, but was released prior to the regular season, on August 26, 1985, in favor of rookie draftee Fuad Reveiz. Garcia was also briefly a member of the Tampa Bay Buccaneers before being released in August 1986.

== Later life and death ==
Garcia met his wife, Jill, while playing with the Packers, and had two daughters with her. He retired after his stint with the Buccaneers and worked briefly for Texas Instruments before joining the Oshkosh Corporation. He worked in marketing and sales in the Oshkosh Corporation's defense division; according to his obituary in the Green Bay Press-Gazette, it "was often joked that Eddie could sell ice to a penguin in relation to his sales talents". He helped organize the corporation's Packers Military Appreciation Game and after retiring from Oshkosh, served on the Packers Board of Directors for the sales and marketing committee. Garcia died on June 5, 2025, at the age of 65.
