= Mike Meade =

American football player (born 1960)

No. 39, 36
- Position: Running back

Personal information
- Born: February 12, 1960 (age 66); Dover, Delaware, U.S.
- Listed height: 5 ft 11 in (1.80 m)
- Listed weight: 228 lb (103 kg)

Career information
- High school: Dover
- College: Penn State
- NFL draft: 1982: 5th round, 126th overall pick

Career history
- Green Bay Packers (1982–1983); Detroit Lions (1984–1985)

Career NFL statistics
- Rushing yards: 261
- Rushing average: 3.6
- Rushing touchdowns: 1
- Stats at Pro Football Reference

Mike Meade (born February 12, 1960) is a former running back in the National Football League (NFL).

== Biography ==
Meade was born Michael Lee Meade on February 12, 1960, in Dover, Delaware.

== Career ==
Meade was selected by the Green Bay Packers in the fifth round of the 1982 NFL draft and played two seasons with the team before playing two seasons with the Detroit Lions. He played at the collegiate level at Pennsylvania State University.

== Honors ==
In 1997 Meade was inducted into the Delaware Sports Hall of Fame.
