= Mark Lewis (tight end) =

American football player (born 1961)

No. 89, 81
- Position: Tight end

Personal information
- Born: May 5, 1961 (age 65); Houston, Texas, U.S.
- Listed height: 6 ft 2 in (1.88 m)
- Listed weight: 239 lb (108 kg)

Career information
- High school: Kashmere (Houston)
- College: Texas A&M
- NFL draft: 1985: 6th round, 155th overall pick

Career history
- Green Bay Packers (1985–1987); Detroit Lions (1987-1988)

Career NFL statistics
- Receptions: 5
- Receiving yards: 39
- Touchdowns: 3
- Stats at Pro Football Reference

Mark Joseph Lewis (born May 5, 1961) is an American former professional football player who was a tight end in the National Football League (NFL). He played four seasons for the Green Bay Packers and Detroit Lions. He played college football for the Texas A&M Aggies

== Early life ==
Lewis was born on May 5, 1961, in Houston, Texas, where he attended Kashmere High School. His mother died while he was in high school and he was raised by his father, who worked in a styeelyard. He was named a high school All-American while playing for the school's football team. He attended Texas A&M University where he played college football, although he missed parts of two seasons due to injury and a family tragedy.

== Professional career ==
He was selected by the Packers in the sixth round of the 1985 NFL draft with the 155th overall pick. Lewis played parts of three seasons for the Packers before being released and then signed by the Detroit Lions. Over his four-year career, Lewis played in 30 games, catching 5 receptions for 39 yards and 3 touchdowns. During his professional career, Lewis was more known for his speed and agility, however he struggled at blocking and drops.
