= Johnnie Gray =

American football player (born 1953)

No. 24
- Position: Safety

Personal information
- Born: December 18, 1953 (age 72); Lake Charles, Louisiana, U.S.
- Listed height: 5 ft 11 in (1.80 m)
- Listed weight: 185 lb (84 kg)

Career information
- High school: Lompoc (Lompoc, California)
- College: Cal State Fullerton
- NFL draft: 1975: undrafted

Career history
- Green Bay Packers (1975–1983)

Awards and highlights
- PFWA All-Rookie Team (1975); Green Bay Packers Hall of Fame

Career NFL statistics
- Interceptions: 22
- Fumble recoveries: 22
- Defensive TDs: 1
- Stats at Pro Football Reference

Johnnie Lee Gray (born December 18, 1953) is an American former professional football player who was a safety for the Green Bay Packers of the National Football League (NFL). He played college football for the Cal State Fullerton Titans. He was inducted into the Green Bay Packers Hall of Fame.

== Early life and career ==
Gray was born in Lake Charles, Louisiana and graduated from Lompoc High School in Lompoc, California. He played college football at Allan Hancock College and California State University, Fullerton.

He was an undrafted rookie with the Green Bay Packers in the 1975 NFL season and played for the team for nine seasons. Gray was inducted into the Green Bay Packers Hall of Fame in 1993. After retiring as a player, Gray was a football analyst for a FOX affiliate. He is now a uniform inspector for the National Football League. He co-hosts Pack Attack TV program on central Wisconsin's local ABC WAOW. Johnnie also works as an instructional aide at Syble Hopp School in De Pere, WI, a school that educates children with disabilities.
