= John Meyer (American football) =

American football player and coach (1942–2020)

No. 54
- Position: Linebacker

Personal information
- Born: February 20, 1942; Chicago, Illinois, U.S.
- Died: November 4, 2020 (aged 78); Chicago, Illinois, U.S.
- Listed height: 6 ft 1 in (1.85 m)
- Listed weight: 225 lb (102 kg)

Career information
- High school: Brother Rice (IL)
- College: Notre Dame (1961-1964)
- NFL draft: 1965: 8th round, 110th overall pick
- AFL draft: 1965: 15th round, 120th overall pick

Career history

Playing
- Houston Oilers (1966)

Coaching
- Boston/New England Patriots (1969-1972) Linebackers coach; Detroit Lions (1973–1974) Linebackers coach; Green Bay Packers (1975–1979) Linebackers coach; Green Bay Packers (1980–1983) Defensive coordinator

Career AFL statistics
- Sacks: 1
- Stats at Pro Football Reference
- Coaching profile at Pro Football Reference

John Edwin Meyer (February 20, 1942 – November 4, 2020) was an American professional football player and coach. He played as a linebacker for the Houston Oilers in the American Football League (AFL).

== Biography ==
Meyer graduated from Brother Rice High School.

=== Playing career ===
Meyer played at the collegiate level at the University of Notre Dame. He played with the Houston Oilers of the AFL as a linebacker during the 1966 AFL season after being traded to the team by the Buffalo Bills. The Bills had drafted him in the fifteenth round of the 1965 AFL draft. Meyer had also been drafted by the St. Louis Cardinals in the eighth round of the 1965 NFL draft. While with the Oilers, John played all fourteen games in 1966 at linebacker before suffering a career-ending injury. After his playing career, John became one of the youngest assistant coaches in the NFL.

=== Coaching career ===
Meyer served as an assistant coach with the Oilers, New England Patriots and Detroit Lions before joining the Green Bay Packers. With the Packers, he served as linebackers coach from 1975 to 1979 and defensive coordinator from 1980 to 1983. Following his time in the NFL, Meyer later became a part-time assistant coach at St. Norbert College.

=== Death ===
Meyer died from COVID-19 on November 4, 2020, at age 78.
