= Greg Koch =

American football player (born 1955)

No. 68
- Positions: Tackle, guard

Personal information
- Born: June 14, 1955 (age 71); Bethesda, Maryland, U.S.
- Listed height: 6 ft 4 in (1.93 m)
- Listed weight: 270 lb (122 kg)

Career information
- High school: Spring Woods (Houston, Texas)
- College: Arkansas
- NFL draft: 1977: 2nd round, 39th overall pick

Career history
- Green Bay Packers (1977–1985); Miami Dolphins (1986–1987); Minnesota Vikings (1987)

Awards and highlights
- Second-team All-Pro (1982); Green Bay Packers Hall of Fame; University of Arkansas Sports Hall of Honor; Arkansas Sports Hall of Fame; First-team All-Southwest Conference (SWC) (1975); Second-team All-SWC (1976); University of Arkansas 1970s All-Decade Team; 1976 Cotton Bowl Classic champions; 1975 SWC co-champions

Career NFL statistics
- Games played: 159
- Games started: 143
- Stats at Pro Football Reference

Greg Koch (born June 14, 1955) is an American former professional football player who was a tackle and guard for 11 seasons in the National Football League (NFL), primarily with the Green Bay Packers. He played college football for the Arkansas Razorbacks. In 2010, Koch was inducted into the Green Bay Packers Hall of Fame. Koch was also inducted into the University of Arkansas Sports Hall of Honor in 2010. He was inducted in the State of Arkansas Sports Hall of Fame in March 2016. He is a licensed attorney and was co-host of In The Trenches with Koch and Kalu on SportsTalk 790 KBME in Houston, Texas until retiring in 2019. Koch is also known for his 16-hour drinking contest with former WWE star Lex Luger. Koch was included in The 100 greatest Packers Players for the 100 year celebration of the NFL checking in at number 67.

== College career ==
Koch was a four-year letterman at the University of Arkansas. He was a starter for the Arkansas Razorbacks where he was part of the offensive line that blocked for the school record 3,523 rushing yards in 1975. That same season Koch was named First-Team All-SWC. Koch played in the All-America Bowl in Tampa, Florida after the 1976 season. Koch was named to the Razorback 1970s All-Decade team with offensive linemen R. C. Thielemann, Leotis Harris, George Stewart, and Greg Kolenda. Koch helped Arkansas win a share of the 1975 SWC championship, and then defeat Georgia in the 1976 Cotton Bowl Classic. He is considered one of the best offensive linemen to ever play for the Razorbacks.

== Professional career ==
=== Green Bay Packers ===
A second-round draft choice in 1977 from the University of Arkansas, Koch played nine seasons (1977–85) in Green Bay, appearing in 133 games. A fixture at right tackle almost immediately upon his arrival, he was a Second-team All-Pro selection following the 1982 season and was part of one of the greatest offenses in club history when the Packers amassed 6,172 yards in 1983, the second-best output ever in club annals. He was inducted into the Green Bay Packers Hall of Fame in 2010.

=== Miami Dolphins ===
Koch played his final two seasons with Miami in 1986 and the first game of 1987 at his customary right tackle spot. After the strike in 1987, his former Packer offensive coordinator Bob Schnelker traded two draft choices for him in Minnesota.

=== Minnesota Vikings ===
He played right guard for the Vikings in 1987 where they made it to the NFC Championship game, eventually losing to the Washington Redskins. Despite being wanted back by the Vikings in 1988, he then went to law school and became a practicing attorney and part-time radio host in Houston, Texas.
