= Dick Rehbein =

American football player and coach (1955–2001)

Personal information
- Born: November 22, 1955; Green Bay, Wisconsin, U.S.
- Died: August 6, 2001 (aged 45); Boston, Massachusetts, U.S.

Career information
- College: Ripon

Career history
- Green Bay Packers (1979–1983) Special teams coordinator; Los Angeles Express (1984) Special teams coordinator & assistant offensive line coach; Minnesota Vikings (1984) Special assistant; Minnesota Vikings (1985–1988) Wide receivers coach; Minnesota Vikings (1989–1991) Assistant offensive coordinator; New York Giants (1992) Tight ends coach; New York Giants (1993–1996) Wide receivers coach; New York Giants (1997) Tight ends coach; New York Giants (1998–1999) Offensive line coach; New England Patriots (2000–2001) Quarterbacks coach

Richard Rehbein (November 22, 1955 – August 6, 2001) was an American football coach for twenty three seasons in the NFL, filling a variety of roles as an offensive position coach.

== Playing career ==
Rehbein attended Ripon College, where he was a Division III All-American center. He was part of the Green Bay Packers' 1977 training camp but did not make their final roster.

== Coaching career ==
Starting in 1979, Rehbein served as the Packers' special teams coach before moving to the USFL's Los Angeles Express, then the NFL's Minnesota Vikings in 1984. In Minnesota, Rehbein served in multiple offensive coaching capacities and in 1992, joined the New York Giants' coaching staff as a tight ends coach.

After also coaching the Giants' wide receivers and offensive line, Rehbein left the Giants to be the quarterbacks coach of the New England Patriots in 2000. Though Rehbein's time with the Patriots was short due to his death in 2001, he played a large role in the franchise by championing the draft selection of then-little-known Tom Brady. Chosen in the sixth round of the 2000 NFL draft with the 199th pick, Brady would then go on to win three MVPs and a record seven Super Bowls, including six with the Patriots. Brady described Rehbein as being a "tremendous influence on my life".

== Death ==
Given a few days off by Patriots head coach Bill Belichick in the middle of his second training camp with the team, Rehbein used the time to exercise at a gym with his 12-year-old daughter Sarabeth on August 5, 2001. While running on a treadmill, Rehbein blacked out but regained consciousness enough to enter an ambulance under his own power. He was transferred to Massachusetts General Hospital in Boston, where tests later that day concluded his loss of consciousness was due to a heart condition he had been diagnosed with in 1988, cardiomyopathy. That night, Rehbein contacted then-Patriots offensive coordinator Charlie Weis and told him he would be back with the Patriots in time for their 7 PM EDT coaches' meeting the next day.

On the following morning, Rehbein underwent a stress test on his heart. During the recovery period directly following the test, Rehbein lost consciousness again but did not regain it as he had the day before. He was declared dead shortly thereafter, with cardiomyopathy declared his cause of death.
