= Mike Douglass (American football) =

American football player (born 1955)

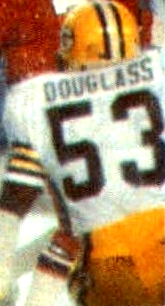

No. 65, 53
- Position: Linebacker

Personal information
- Born: March 15, 1955 (age 71); St. Louis, Missouri, U.S.
- Listed height: 6 ft 0 in (1.83 m)
- Listed weight: 220 lb (100 kg)

Career information
- High school: Jordan (Los Angeles, California)
- College: San Diego State
- NFL draft: 1978: 5th round, 116th overall pick

Career history
- Green Bay Packers (1978–1985); San Diego Chargers (1986)

Awards and highlights
- Packers Hall of Fame

Career NFL statistics
- Sacks: 38
- Fumble recoveries: 17
- Interceptions: 10
- Stats at Pro Football Reference

Michael Reese Douglass (born March 15, 1955) is an American former professional football player who was a linebacker for the Green Bay Packers (1978–1985) and the San Diego Chargers (1986) of the National Football League (NFL). He played college football for the San Diego State Aztecs. He ranks third in career tackles in Packers history and was inducted into the Green Bay Packers Hall of Fame in 2003.
