= Mark Murphy (safety, born 1958) =

American football player (born 1958)

No. 37
- Position: Safety

Personal information
- Born: April 22, 1958 (age 68); Canton, Ohio, U.S.
- Listed height: 6 ft 2 in (1.88 m)
- Listed weight: 201 lb (91 kg)

Career information
- High school: GlenOak (Canton)
- College: West Liberty State
- NFL draft: 1980: undrafted

Career history
- Green Bay Packers (1980–1991)

Awards and highlights
- Green Bay Packers Hall of Fame (1998); West Liberty's Athletic Hall of Fame (1993)

Career NFL statistics
- Interceptions: 20
- Fumble recoveries: 13
- Sacks: 11
- Stats at Pro Football Reference

Mark Steven Murphy (born April 22, 1958) is an American former professional football player who was a safety for the Green Bay Packers of the National Football League (NFL). After graduating from GlenOak High School near his hometown of Canton, Ohio, Murphy attended West Liberty State College. At West Liberty, he played college football for all four years, with the last three as a starter for the Hilltoppers. In his senior year, he was named All-WVIAC and won the WVIAC championship. He went undrafted in the 1980 NFL draft, but was subsequently signed by the Green Bay Packers as an undrafted free agent. He played for the Packers for 12 years before retiring in 1991. After his playing career, Murphy coached high school and college football in Ohio. He was elected to the Green Bay Packers Hall of Fame in 1998 in recognition of his contributions to the team.

== Early life and college ==
Mark Murphy was born on April 22, 1958, in Canton, Ohio. As a child, he suffered from alopecia and lost his hair by the third grade. Murphy attended Oakwood High School before it merged with Glenwood High School to form GlenOak High School. At GlenOak, he played on the football team, primarily as a defensive back but also as a running back and wide receiver. With the merger of the two high schools (Glenwood and Oakwood), there were over 100 different players on the GlenOak football team. Most players were thus able to focus on just an offensive or defensive position (instead of playing both), meaning Murphy was able to focus and develop his skills in the defensive backfield. During his senior year, he was named second-team All-Federal League and second-team All-Stark County while helping lead GlenOak's defense, which allowed the third lowest points in Stark County and was rated the best versus the pass. At the end of his senior year, when he was playing primarily as a cornerback, Murphy was still relatively small, coming in under six feet in height and weighing in at 165 pounds.

After high school, he attended West Liberty State College, where he played college football. During his freshman year, he grew four inches taller and gained 40 pounds. Murphy entered the starting line-up during his sophomore year at West Liberty, where he was named All-WVIAC for the first time. In his junior year, he led the team in interceptions and was near the top in tackles and punt returns. In his last year of college, West Liberty won the 1979 WVIAC championship while he led the team in total tackles, interceptions, fumble recoveries and blocked kicks. That year he was also named All-WVIAC again. Murphy noted that when he started playing college football, he was not highly regarded or expected to have a future in professional football. However, by his junior year he began to receive interest from professional teams and by his senior year he was starting to be watched by professional scouts. In 1993, Murphy was inducted into West Liberty's athletic hall of fame. In 2010, he was also inducted into the Stark County High School Football Hall of Fame.

== Professional career ==
=== Green Bay Packers ===
Murphy went undrafted in the 1980 NFL draft but was signed as an undrafted free agent shortly thereafter. He played in the Pro Football Hall of Fame Game at the beginning of the preseason before the 1980 NFL season. Early in the game he broke his wrist and after the game was placed on injured reserve. He would go on to miss almost the entire season before making his NFL debut in the last game of the season. Coming into the 1981 NFL season, Murphy was the second string strong safety behind Johnnie Gray and was also fighting for the free safety position behind Mike Jolly. Jolly got injured in the preseason and then Gray got injured partway through the season. Murphy took over as the starting strong safety, playing alongside Maurice Harvey, who was signed off waivers. Murphy recorded three interceptions and recovered two fumbles that year, earning him "Rookie of the Year" distinction from the Wisconsin Sports media. Gray returned in 1982 from his injury, pushing Murphy into the nickelback position. He played all nine games during the strike-shortened 1982 NFL season, with the Packers making the playoffs for the first and only time during his career.

Four games into the 1983 NFL season, Harvey was waived by the Packers and Murphy was made the starter at strong safety. A few weeks later, Murphy started the Packers' week 7 game against the Washington Redskins, which was on Monday Night Football. The Packers won a back-and-forth game 49–48, which at the time was the highest scoring Monday Night Football game ever and was ranked the 75th greatest game in the history of the NFL. The game also featured another Mark Murphy, a safety for the Redskins from 1977 to 1984, who would go on to become the president of the Green Bay Packers in 2008. In 1984, Murphy started all 16 games, recording one interception and one fumble recovery. The next year, he recorded two interceptions, one fumble recovery and scored the only touchdown of his career. During a late season game against the Minnesota Vikings, Murphy intercepted the ball at mid-field with about four minutes left in the game and returned it for the touchdown. Teammate Tim Lewis made another interception, this time in the end zone, on the subsequent Vikings' drive. Both interceptions secured the victory for the Packers.

In 1986, Murphy suffered a stress fracture in his left foot that ultimately prevented him from playing the whole season. There was also concern that the injury would end his career, however after rehabilitation, Murphy returned for the 1987 NFL season, playing 12 games. His play early in the season, as well as injuries to teammates, helped Murphy reclaim his starting job as strong safety. 1988 was statistically Murphy's best season: he set career-highs with five interceptions and four fumble recoveries while only playing in 14 of 16 games. In 1989, 1990 and 1991, Murphy recorded three interceptions each year while starting every game of all three seasons. Packers' historian Cliff Christl noted in a profile of Murphy that the most famous play of his career came in a 1989 game against the defending champion San Francisco 49ers. With just over two minutes left in the game and down by four points, future hall of fame quarterback Joe Montana threw a pass intended for future hall of fame wide receiver Jerry Rice. Murphy knocked the pass down close to the end zone, preserving a 21–17 upset victory for the Packers. Prior to the 1992 NFL season, the Packers decided to move LeRoy Butler, a second year safety, to the starting strong safety position. Murphy requested a release from the team, which was granted. Murphy did not sign with another team and ultimately retired from the NFL.

During his tenure with the Packers, Murphy was known as a hard-hitting, run-stopping safety who could also handle his own in pass protection, especially when playing zone coverage. He was never the fastest player in the Packers' defensive backfield but he had a reputation for being a strong tackler. In addition to recording 20 interceptions, 11 sacks and 13 fumble recoveries over his 147 games with the Packers, he also led the team in tackles in 1984, 1988 and 1990. The Packers during Murphy's time though could rarely get past mediocrity. During his 11-year career, the Packers only had two winning seasons, the aforementioned one playoff berth and four other seasons with a record of 8–8. In 1998, the organization inducted Murphy into the Green Bay Packers Hall of Fame, recognizing his contributions to the team over his career.

=== Coaching ===
In 1996 or 1997, Murphy began coaching football at St. Vincent–St. Mary High School in Akron, Ohio. As of 2019, he was the defensive backfield coach and the assistant dean of students. During his tenure, he coached future NBA star LeBron James, who played wide receiver during his sophomore and junior years of high school before committing to basketball. Murphy has also coached at the University of Akron and Malone University.

== Personal life ==
Murphy has four children with his wife, Pam. Murphy noted in an interview in the early 1980s that his hobbies included playing racquetball and that he had an interest in hand guns.
