= Guy Prather =

American football player (1958–2016)

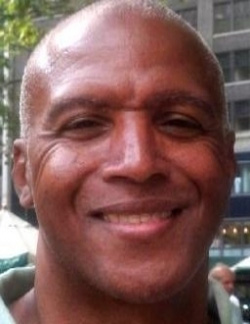

No. 51
- Position: Linebacker

Personal information
- Born: March 28, 1958; Gaithersburg, Maryland, U.S.
- Died: April 18, 2016 (aged 58); Huntersville, North Carolina, U.S.
- Listed height: 6 ft 2 in (1.88 m)
- Listed weight: 230 lb (104 kg)

Career information
- High school: Gaithersburg (Gaithersburg, Maryland)
- College: Grambling State
- NFL draft: 1980: undrafted

Career history
- Dallas Cowboys (1980)*; Green Bay Packers (1981–1985)
- * Offseason or practice squad member only

Career NFL statistics
- Sacks: 2
- Fumble recoveries: 2
- Stats at Pro Football Reference

Guy Tyrone Prather (March 28, 1958 – April 18, 2016) was a linebacker in the National Football League (NFL). He played five seasons with the Green Bay Packers.

Prather died of cancer in 2016.
