= Del Rodgers =

American football player (born 1960)

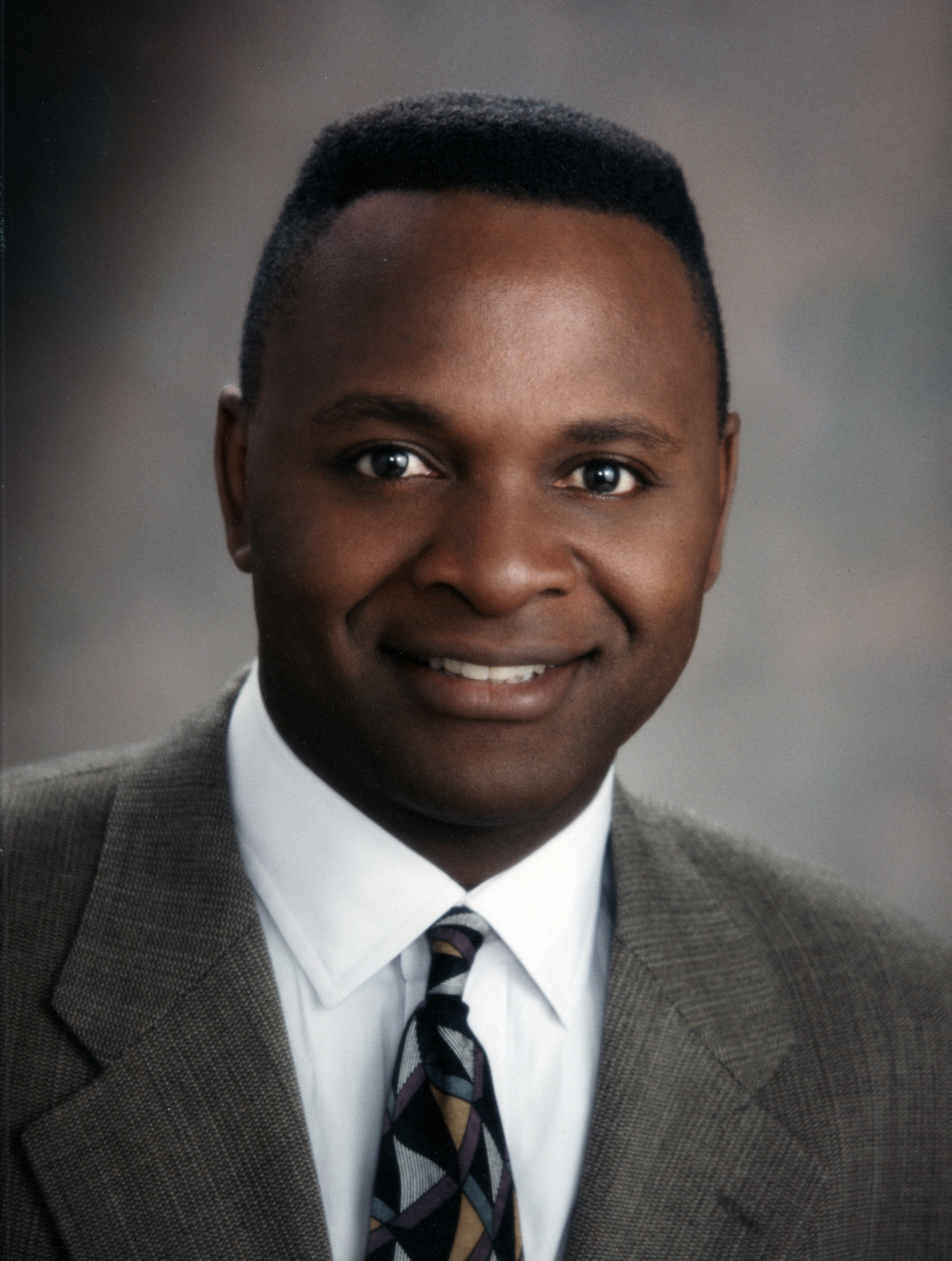

No. 35, 25
- Position: Running back

Personal information
- Born: June 22, 1960 (age 66); Tacoma, Washington, U.S.
- Listed height: 5 ft 10 in (1.78 m)
- Listed weight: 210 lb (95 kg)

Career information
- High school: North Salinas (Salinas, California)
- College: Utah
- NFL draft: 1982: 3rd round, 71st overall pick

Career history
- Green Bay Packers (1982–1985); San Francisco 49ers (1987–1988)

Awards and highlights
- Super Bowl champion (XXIII); First-team All-WAC (1981)

Career NFL statistics
- Rushing yards: 315
- Rushing average: 3.8
- Rushing touchdowns: 16
- Return yards: 1,735
- Return touchdowns: 1
- Stats at Pro Football Reference

Rodrick Del Rodgers (born June 22, 1960) is an American former professional football player and television reporter. During his professional football career, he played for the Green Bay Packers and the San Francisco 49ers of the National Football League (NFL). He played college football for the Utah Utes and was the first 1,000 yard rusher in the school's history. He was later hired by KCRA-TV in Sacramento in 1997, and retired in 2025 after 28 years at the station.

== Pro football career ==
Rodgers was selected by the Green Bay Packers in the third round of the 1982 NFL draft. From 1982 to 1985, Rodgers played for the Packers. On December 9, 1984, he made a 97-yard kick return for a touchdown against the Chicago Bears, which set the record at the time for the longest kickoff return by an opponent. After sitting out the 1986 season due to an injury, Rodgers was cut by the San Francisco 49ers in training camp in 1987, but returned as a replacement player during the player's strike that year, and was retained after the strike ended. He remained on the 49ers through the following year, earning a Super Bowl championship for the 1988 season.

== Sports broadcasting ==
In 1985, Rodgers’ first television foray was when he joined KMST-TV in Monterey, CA. Later on he joined KSBW-TV in Salinas, CA. He then moved on to KIRO-TV in Seattle, WA before joining WXIA-TV in Atlanta.

Del Rodgers was the Sports Director at KCRA in Sacramento, CA, joining the station in September 1997. He anchored sportscasts Monday through Friday, where he was committed to covering Sacramento-area high school sports.

On December 1, 2025, Rodgers retired from KCRA after 28 years at the station and 36 years in sports journalism.
