= Jessie Clark =

American football player (born 1960)

No. 33, 32, 34
- Position: Running back

Personal information
- Born: January 3, 1960 (age 66); Thebes, Arkansas, U.S.
- Listed height: 6 ft 0 in (1.83 m)
- Listed weight: 231 lb (105 kg)

Career information
- High school: Crossett (AR)
- College: Arkansas; Louisiana Tech
- NFL draft: 1983: 7th round, 188th overall pick

Career history
- Green Bay Packers (1983–1987); Detroit Lions (1988); Arizona Cardinals (1988-1989); Minnesota Vikings (1989-1990)

Career NFL statistics
- Rushing yards: 1,736
- Rushing average: 4.2
- Rushing touchdowns: 9
- Stats at Pro Football Reference

Jessie Lee Clark (born January 3, 1960) is an American former professional football player who was a running back for eight seasons in the National Football League (NFL) for the Green Bay Packers, Detroit Lions, Arizona Cardinals, and Minnesota Vikings. After graduating from Crossett High School in 1978, Clark played college football for the Louisiana Tech Bulldogs and Arkansas Razorbacks. He was selected by the Green Bay Packers in the 7th round (188th overall) of the 1983 NFL Draft.
