= Ron Hallstrom =

American football player (born 1959)

No. 65
- Position: Guard

Personal information
- Born: June 11, 1959 (age 67); Holden, Massachusetts, U.S.
- Listed height: 6 ft 6 in (1.98 m)
- Listed weight: 300 lb (136 kg)

Career information
- High school: Moline (IL)
- College: Iowa
- NFL draft: 1982: 1st round, 22nd overall pick

Career history
- Green Bay Packers (1982–1992); Philadelphia Eagles (1993)

Awards and highlights
- First-team All-Big Ten (1981)

Career NFL statistics
- Games played: 174
- Games started: 132
- Fumble recoveries: 5
- Stats at Pro Football Reference

Ronald David Hallstrom (born June 11, 1959) is an American former professional football player who was a guard in the National Football League (NFL) for the Green Bay Packers and the Philadelphia Eagles. He played college football at the University of Iowa and was selected in the first round of the 1982 NFL draft with the 22nd overall pick.
