= Robert J. Parins =

American judge and NFL executive (1918-2017)

- Parins at a news conference in 1981

President of the Green Bay Packers
- In office 1982–1989
- Preceded by: Dominic Olejniczak
- Succeeded by: Bob Harlan

Wisconsin Circuit Judge for the Brown Circuit, Branch 2
- In office August 1, 1978 – June 1, 1982
- Preceded by: Transitioned from 14th circ.
- Succeeded by: Vivi L. Dilweg

Wisconsin Circuit Judge for the 14th Circuit, Branch 2
- In office January 1, 1968 – July 31, 1978
- Preceded by: Raymond J. Rahr
- Succeeded by: Transitioned to Brown circ.

District Attorney of Brown County, Wisconsin
- In office January 1, 1949 – January 1, 1951
- Preceded by: J. Norman Basten
- Succeeded by: Bernard J. Bertrand

Personal details
- Born: August 23, 1918 Green Bay, Wisconsin, U.S.
- Died: May 26, 2017 (aged 98) Hobart, Wisconsin, U.S.
- Resting place: Allouez Catholic Cemetery, Green Bay
- Party: Democratic
- Education: University of Wisconsin Law School
- Profession: Lawyer, judge

Robert James Parins (August 23, 1918 – May 26, 2017) was an American lawyer, judge, and National Football League executive. He was president of the Green Bay Packers from 1982 to 1989, and served in various other leadership roles in the Packers organization. He previously served 14 years as a Wisconsin circuit court judge in Brown County (1968–1982) and served two years as district attorney (1949–1951). Later in life, acting as a reserve judge, he played a notable role in a case related to the American serial killer Jeffrey Dahmer.

He was elected president of the Green Bay Packers in 1982, serving as the first full-time president in team history. His tenure was marked more for organizational successes than on-field victories. In recognition of his accomplishments, which included the formation of the Green Bay Packers Foundation, financial improvements, and facility expansion, Parins was inducted into the Green Bay Packers Hall of Fame in 1998.

== Early life ==
Robert Parins was born on August 23, 1918, in Green Bay, Wisconsin. He graduated from Green Bay East High School in 1936 and received a law degree from the University of Wisconsin Law School in 1942. Parins was a noted lifelong fan of the Green Bay Packers, which started during his childhood. He attended games in the 1920s and even helped early Packers players—Parins noted Jug Earp specifically—carry their equipment before games.

== Career ==
=== Legal career ===
After his college graduation, Parins took a job as an insurance adjuster with Employer's Mutual of Wausau in Minneapolis, Minnesota. He moved back to Green Bay in 1944 and began practicing law. He served as the Brown County, Wisconsin, district attorney from 1949 to 1950. He practiced law with the firm of Cohen, Parins, Cohen and Grant until 1967. In 1968, he was elected a Wisconsin circuit court judge for the 14th Judicial Circuit, which covered Brown, Door, and Kewaunee counties. While in this role, he lectured across the state to schools and judicial groups. Parins served as a state circuit court judge until 1982, when he retired to serve as president of the Green Bay Packers. After his tenure with the Packers ended in 1989, he returned to serving as a judge in a reserve capacity. He also handled over 1,000 mediation or arbitration cases before retiring from his legal career at the age of 88.

==== Jeffrey Dahmer case ====
In 1993, Parins was selected to hear an appeal regarding the dismissal of police officers Joseph T. Gabrish and John Balcerzak. The officers were originally fired for returning Konerak Sinthasomphone to serial killer Jeffrey Dahmer. Sinthasomphone, a 14-year-old Laotian boy, was abducted by Dahmer and had been reported missing. He escaped Dahmer the next day and was found naked, drugged, and bleeding by three black women. The women called police and officers showed up, two being Gabrish and Balcerzak. The officers escorted Sinthasomphone back inside Dahmer's apartment, where he convinced the officers that Sinthasomphone was his romantic partner and was drunk. They subsequently made homophobic remarks regarding the incident. Sinthasomphone became Dahmer's 13th rape and murder victim.

Parins was chosen for his experience with similar cases and due to not living in Milwaukee, where the events took place. In 1994, Parins ruled that even though the officers had made mistakes, they should not have been dismissed because they did not commit "gross negligence" in the discharge of their duties. He ordered the officers reinstated and awarded each around US$55,000 as back pay. The ruling was controversial, with both the family of Sinthasomphone and the Milwaukee police force disagreeing with Parins's decision.

=== Executive for Green Bay Packers ===
In 1966, Parins was elected to the board of directors of Green Bay Packers, Inc., the non-profit organization that owns the Green Bay Packers. Parins was elected to the executive committee as vice president in 1979. Two years later, in 1981, Parins assumed all of the roles and responsibilities of the presidency but still retained his vice president title. In 1982, after the death of Dominic Olejniczak, Parins was formally elected president of the Packers. Parins became the first full-time president in the Packers' history and took on the additional title of chief executive officer in 1988. He would serve as president for seven years until retiring in 1989. Parins was succeeded in the role of president by Bob Harlan. Parins's retirement marked an end to the tradition of electing local leaders to be president—Harlan was promoted from within and his profession was in football. Parins remained on the board of directors until 1994, after which he was named director emeritus. He held the position of honorary chairman from 1991 to 1994.

Although Parins's time as president saw little on-field success, his tenure was notable for the Packers' financial improvements, reorganized management structure and expansion of team facilities. While Parins was president, the Packers' record was 43–61–2 and they only made the playoffs once. However, Parins implemented various committees, including an investment committee, to try to harness the skills of the various board members. The Packers saw immediate results, with the team reporting a profit increase from $2 million in 1986 to $3 million in 1987. Some of this increase can be attributed to the 72 new private box seats added to Lambeau Field, which increased the stadium's capacity to 56,926. The Packers constructed their first indoor practice facility and expanded their administrative offices. The net worth of the Packers also grew from $14.9 million to $25.9 million during his tenure. Parins was additionally credited with separating the head coach and football management duties by hiring a vice president of football operations for the first time. One of Parins's lasting impacts, though, came from the creation of the Green Bay Packers Foundation—the Packers' charitable organization—in 1986. In recognition of these accomplishments, Parins was inducted into the Green Bay Packers Hall of Fame in 1998.

== Personal life ==
Parins was active in the local community, a noted sports enthusiast, and an outdoorsman. He was married in 1941 to Elizabeth Carroll and had five children. Parins died on May 26, 2017, in Hobart, Wisconsin, at the age of 98.

Sporting positions
| Preceded by Dominic Olejniczak | President of the Green Bay Packers; 1982–1989 | Succeeded by Bob Harlan |
Legal offices
| Preceded by J. Norman Basten | District Attorney of Brown County, Wisconsin; January 1, 1949 – January 1, 1951 | Succeeded by Bernard J. Bertrand |
| Preceded by Raymond J. Rahr | Wisconsin Circuit Judge for the 14th Circuit, Branch 2 January 1, 1968 – July 31, 1978 | Circuit abolished |
| New circuit established | Wisconsin Circuit Judge for the Brown Circuit, Branch 2 August 1, 1978 – June 1, 1982 | Succeeded by Vivi L. Dilweg |
