= Karl Swanke =

American football player (born 1957)

No. 67
- Position: Offensive tackle

Personal information
- Born: December 29, 1957 (age 68); Elmhurst, Illinois, U.S.
- Listed height: 6 ft 6 in (1.98 m)
- Listed weight: 257 lb (117 kg)

Career information
- High school: Newington (Newington, Connecticut)
- College: Boston College
- NFL draft: 1980: 6th round, 143rd overall pick

Career history
- Green Bay Packers (1980–1986)

Career NFL statistics
- Games played: 84
- Games started: 61
- Fumble recoveries: 3
- Touchdowns: 1
- Stats at Pro Football Reference

Karl Swanke (born December 29, 1957) is an American former professional football player who was an offensive tackle in the National Football League (NFL). He played college football for the Boston College Eagles and was selected by the Green Bay Packers in the sixth round of the 1980 NFL draft.
