= Robert Brown (American football, born 1960) =

American football player (born 1960)

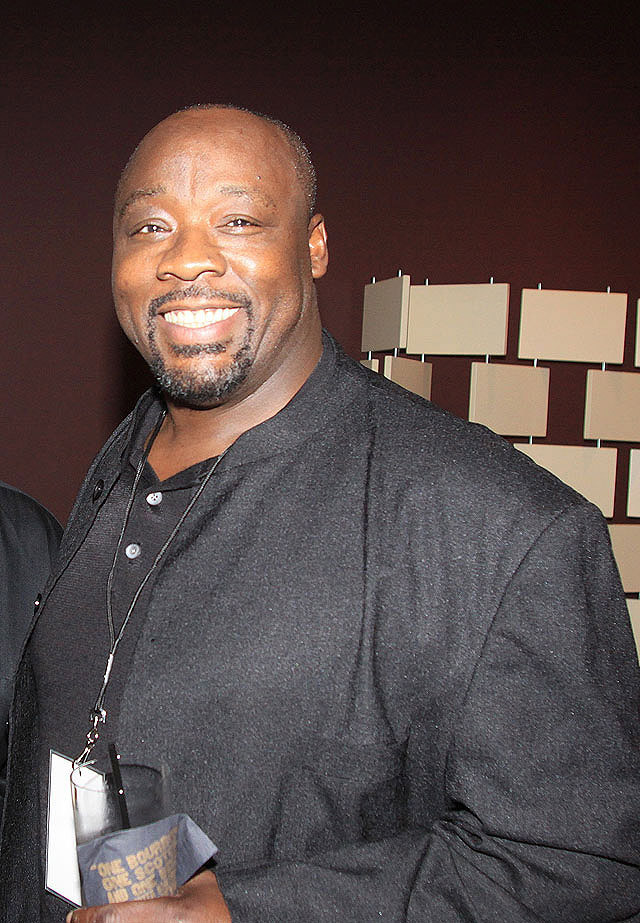
- Robert Brown

No. 93
- Position: Defensive end

Personal information
- Born: May 21, 1960 (age 66); Edenton, North Carolina, U.S.
- Listed height: 6 ft 2 in (1.88 m)
- Listed weight: 268 lb (122 kg)

Career information
- High school: John A. Holmes (Edenton)
- College: Virginia Tech
- NFL draft: 1982: 4th round, 98th overall pick

Career history
- Green Bay Packers (1982–1992); Indianapolis Colts (1994)*
- * Offseason or practice squad member only

Awards and highlights
- Second-team All-American (1981)

Career NFL statistics
- Sacks: 25.5
- Interceptions: 2
- Fumble recoveries: 13
- Stats at Pro Football Reference

Robert Lee Brown (born May 21, 1960) is an American former professional football player who was a defensive end in the National Football League (NFL).

Born and raised in Edenton, North Carolina, Brown played scholastically at John A. Holmes High School. He began his collegiate career at Chowan Junior College in Murfreesboro, North Carolina, where he was named to the Coastal Conference first-team and was an honorable mention junior college All-American. He went on to play for the Virginia Tech Hokies, where, as a senior, he was honored by the Newspaper Enterprise Association as a second-team All-American.

Brown was selected 98th overall by the Green Bay Packers in the fourth-round of the 1982 NFL draft. He spent his entire eleven year career with the Packers, his first four years as a reserve and last seven as a starter. For his career, Brown recorded 25.5 sacks and 13 fumble recoveries. He had 2 interceptions, one of which he returned 5 yards for a touchdown.
