= Randy Scott (American football) =

American football player (born 1959)

No. 55, 50
- Position: Linebacker

Personal information
- Born: January 31, 1959 (age 67); Decatur, Georgia, U.S.
- Listed height: 6 ft 1 in (1.85 m)
- Listed weight: 223 lb (101 kg)

Career information
- High school: Columbia (Decatur)
- College: Alabama
- NFL draft: 1981: undrafted

Career history
- Green Bay Packers (1981–1986); Minnesota Vikings (1987)

Awards and highlights
- 2× National champion (1978, 1979); Second-team All-SEC (1980)

Career NFL statistics
- Sacks: 7
- Interceptions: 3
- Fumble recoveries: 6
- Stats at Pro Football Reference

Randolph Charles Scott (born January 31, 1959) is an American former professional football player who was a linebacker in the National Football League (NFL). He played college football for the Alabama Crimson Tide under head coach Bear Bryant. Scott played seven seasons in the NFL for the Green Bay Packers.
