= Mark Lee (American football) =

American football player (born 1958)

No. 22, 27, 32
- Position: Cornerback

Personal information
- Born: March 20, 1958 (age 68); Hanford, California, U.S.
- Listed height: 5 ft 11 in (1.80 m)
- Listed weight: 187 lb (85 kg)

Career information
- High school: Hanford
- College: Washington
- NFL draft: 1980: 2nd round, 34th overall pick

Career history
- Green Bay Packers (1980–1990); San Francisco 49ers (1991); New Orleans Saints (1991)

Awards and highlights
- Green Bay Packers Hall of Fame; First-team All-Pac-10 (1979)

Career NFL statistics
- Interceptions: 32
- Fumble recoveries: 6
- Touchdowns: 1
- Stats at Pro Football Reference

Mark Anthony Lee (born March 20, 1958) is an American former professional football player who was a cornerback in the National Football League (NFL). He played college football for the Washington Huskies and was selected by the Green Bay Packers in the second round of the 1980 NFL draft. Lee also played in the NFL for the San Francisco 49ers and New Orleans Saints. He was inducted into the Green Bay Packers Hall of Fame in 2017.

== Professional career ==
=== Green Bay Packers ===
Lee was drafted by the Green Bay Packers in the second round of the 1980 NFL draft. He played for the Packers from 1980 to 1990 and started 140 of 157 games and recorded 31 interceptions. Lee had a career high nine interceptions in the 1986 season, which as of 2017, is still the second most in a single season in Packers history. On July 22, 2017 he was inducted into the Green Bay Packers Hall of Fame.

=== San Francisco 49ers and New Orleans Saints ===
Lee played the 1991 season for the San Francisco 49ers and New Orleans Saints. He started four of five games and had an interception with the 49ers and started two of three games for the Saints.
