= Buccaneers–Packers rivalry =

National Football League rivalry

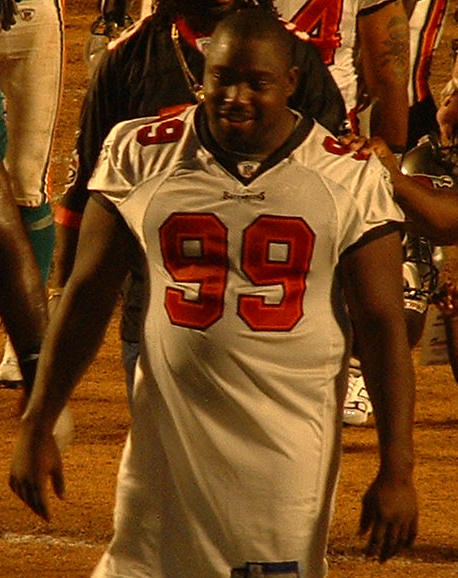
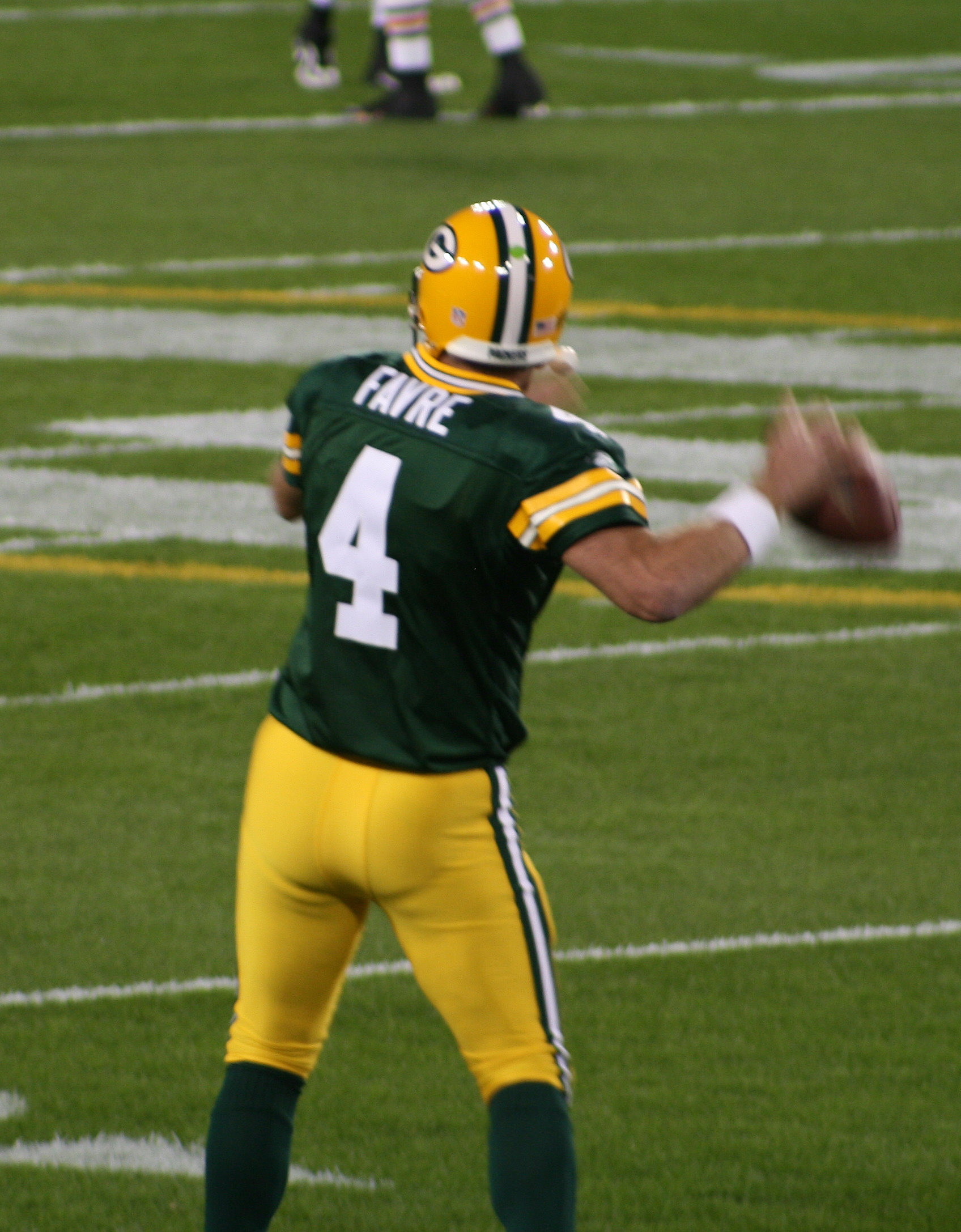
- Warren Sapp (left) and Brett Favre (right) were emblematic of the rivalry in the 1990s

- Tampa Bay Buccaneers Green Bay Packers
- Location: Tampa, Green Bay
- First meeting: October 23, 1976; Packers 13, Buccaneers 0
- Latest meeting: October 4, 2026; Packers 17, Buccaneers 14
- Next meeting: TBD
- Stadiums: Buccaneers: Raymond James Stadium; Packers: Lambeau Field

Statistics
- Total meetings: 60
- All-time series: Packers: 35–24–1
- Regular season series: Packers: 34–23–1
- Postseason results: Tied: 1–1
- Largest victory: Buccaneers: 37–3 (1981); Packers: 55–14 (1983)
- Most points scored: Buccaneers: 38 (2009), (2020); Packers: 55 (1983)
- Longest win streak: Buccaneers: 4 (1987–1989); Packers: 6 (1992–1995, 1996–1998)
- Current win streak: Packers: 1 (2026–present)

Post-season history
- 1997 NFC Divisional: Packers won: 21–7; 2020 NFC Championship Game: Buccaneers won: 31–26

The Buccaneers–Packers rivalry is an American football rivalry between the Tampa Bay Buccaneers and the Green Bay Packers. The Packers entered the National Football League (NFL) in 1921 and saw significant periods of sustained success under Curly Lambeau in the 1930s and 1940s, as well as in the 1960s under Vince Lombardi. However, the Packers entered the 1970s in a sustained slump. They only made the playoffs once from 1968 to 1976. The Buccaneers entered the NFL in 1976 as part of an agreement to expand the league after the AFL–NFL merger. The Packers and Buccaneers played their first game during the 1976 NFL season, with the Packers shutting out the Buccaneers 13–0. The loss was part of the Buccaneers 0–14 record in 1976, the first time an NFL team lost every game in a 14-game season.

In 1977, the NFL realigned the divisions, creating a new NFC Central division that featured the Packers, Buccaneers, Detroit Lions, Minnesota Vikings and Chicago Bears. After this realignment, the Packers and Buccaneers were guaranteed to play each other twice a year according to the NFL scheduling rules. The Packers and Buccaneers would continue their poor form throughout the 1970s, 1980s and the early part of the 1990s, with the Packers only making the playoffs once between 1973 and 1992 and the Buccaneers making it three times before 1996. However, starting in the mid-1990s, both teams made significant personnel moves that led to on-field success. Both teams became perennial playoff contenders, with the Packers winning Super Bowl XXXI in 1997 and the Buccaneers winning Super Bowl XXXVII in 2003. The Packers continued their on-field success in the 2000s and 2010s, while the Buccaneers slumped again. In 2002, the NFL realigned divisions again, and the newly created NFC North no longer included the Buccaneers, who moved to the NFC South. The Packers and Buccaneers stopped playing each other twice a year, although they did meet in the 2020 NFC Championship Game, where the Buccaneers beat the Packers 31–26 in route to their subsequent victory in Super Bowl LV in 2021.

The rivalry between the Buccaneers and Packers was most pronounced from 1977 to 2002, when both teams were division rivals. The rivalry was called the Battle of the Bays but was also known derogatorily as the Bay of Pigs, a play-on-words referencing each team having Bay in it, the actual failed invasion of Cuba during the Cold War of the same name and the consistently poor play of both teams at the beginning of the rivalry. As of the 2025 NFL season, the Packers lead the overall series 35–24–1, with each team winning one of the two playoff games against each other. The rivalry was evenly matched through the 1970s and 1980s, although the Packers dominated the 1990s. Since the 2000s, the rivalry has returned to a more evenly matched series. The most recent game between the two teams was a 17–14 Packers' victory during the 2026 NFL season.

== Pre-rivalry history ==
=== Green Bay Packers (1919–1976) ===
The Green Bay Packers were founded in 1919 by Curly Lambeau and George Whitney Calhoun. After a few years of playing local teams, the Packers entered the National Football League (NFL) in 1921. Between 1929 and 1944, the Packers dominated the NFL, winning six championships and reaching the playoffs two other times. The advent of the forward pass under coach Curly Lambeau and wide receiver Don Hutson revolutionized the way football was played. After the retirement of Hutson and the eventual departure of Lambeau to the Chicago Cardinals, the Packers experienced 15 years of poor results from 1945 to 1959. However, with the hiring of Vince Lombardi, the Packers saw a revival, making the playoffs eight straight seasons and winning five championships, including the first two Super Bowls. After Lombardi departed for the Washington Redskins in 1969, the Packers again experienced a prolonged period of poor results, only making the playoffs once from 1968 to 1976.

=== Tampa Bay Buccaneers (1976) ===
As part of the AFL–NFL merger, it was agreed that the NFL would expand by two teams. The Buccaneers and Seattle Seahawks became these two expansion franchises, both of whom had their inaugural season in 1976. The Buccaneers suffered from primarily having to acquire players through an expansion draft and claims on the waiver wire, with most of the newly acquired players being made up of aging veterans. The Buccaneers became the first team to ever lose every game in a 14-game season. The team did not score until their third game and did not score a touchdown until their fourth; they lost by more than a touchdown eleven times. One of the losses included the first meeting between the Buccaneers and Packers, with the Packers shutting out the Buccaneers 13–0.

== Overview of rivalry ==
=== Division rivals (1977–2001) ===
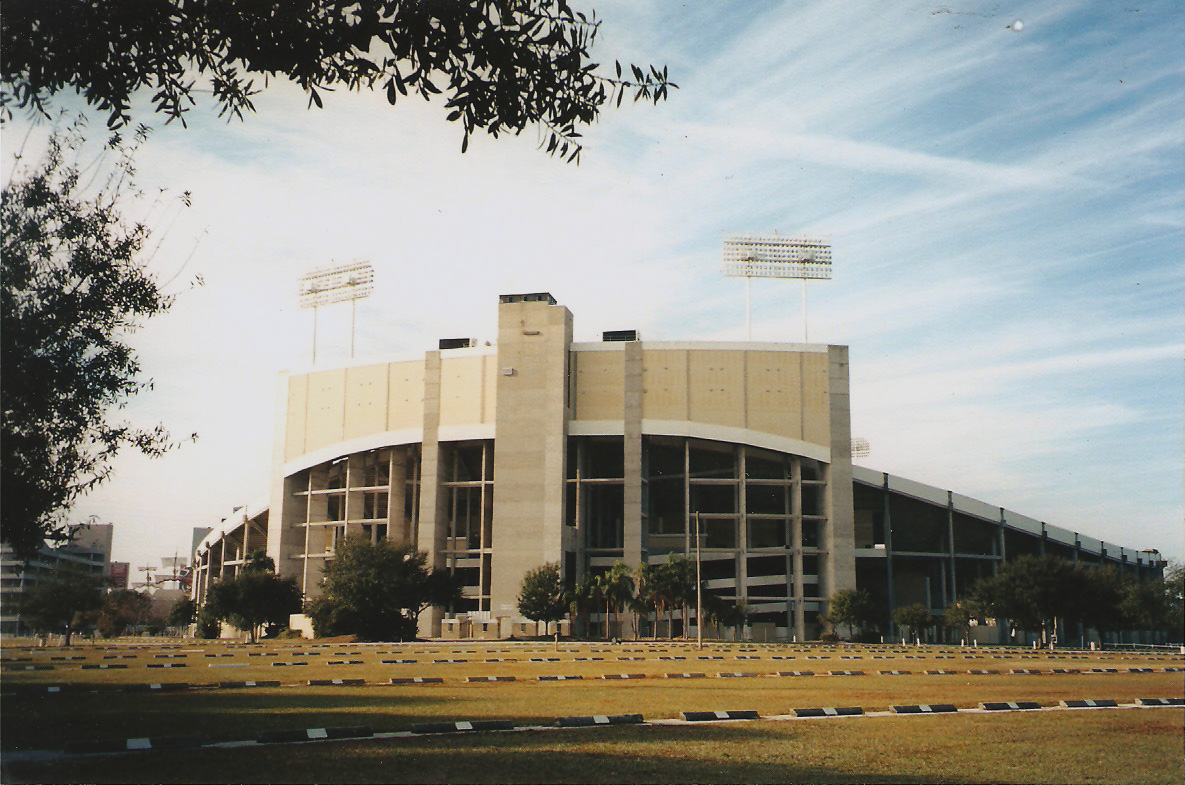
Tampa Stadium, shown here in 1999, was the location of the rivalry's first game

In 1977, the Buccaneers moved from the AFC West division to the NFC Central division, which included the Packers, Chicago Bears, Detroit Lions and Minnesota Vikings. Excluding the 1982 NFL season and 1987 NFL season, which were both impacted by work stoppages, the Buccaneers and Packers played each other twice per season from 1977 to 2001. Starting with the 2002 NFL season, the NFC Central was renamed to the NFC North division and the Buccaneers were moved to the newly created NFC South division. After this realignment, the Buccaneers and Packers play each other at least every three years and once every six seasons at each team's home stadium, but may also play each other in the playoffs or if each team has the same ranking within their own division.

Both the Buccaneers and Packers struggled from the late 1970s to the early 1990s. The Packers went to the playoffs just once from 1976 to 1992, and the Buccaneers went to the playoffs just three times from 1976 to 1996, with one of those times being the strike-shortened 1982 NFL season that featured expanded playoff eligibility. Both teams were consistently at the bottom of their division, often battling it out to determine who would be in last place at the end of the season. The rivalry was often called the Battle of the Bays; it was also derogatorily known as the Bay of Pigs, which was a play on words about the failed invasion of Cuba during the Cold War of the same name, referencing the fact that both teams had Bay in its name and that both teams were such failures on the field for so long.

During the 1980s, both teams accomplished the largest margins of victory in the rivalry, with the Buccaneers beating the Packers 37–3 in 1981 and the Packers beating the Buccaneers 55–14 in 1983. 1980 also saw the only tie of the rivalry, a 14–14 game that saw the Packers miss two field goals attempts that would have won the game. The 1989 Packers team became known as the Cardiac Pack for their ability to win close games in dramatic fashion. This penchant for dramatic endings included a 17–16 victory over the Buccaneers near the end of the season; Buccaneers quarterback Vinny Testaverde, who the Packers intercepted five times during the game, led a drive that ended in a field goal to put the Buccaneers up 16–14 with under two minutes left in the game. However, the Packers, led by quarterback Don Majkowski, drove down the field in time for a walk-off field goal by kicker Chris Jacke.

Starting in the mid-1990s, both teams saw periods of extended success. For the Packers, Brett Favre and Reggie White led the team to six straight playoff appearances from 1993 to 1998, including a victory in Super Bowl XXXI and a loss in Super Bowl XXXII. Favre's first game as a Packer occurred against the Buccaneers; he filled in for an injured Majkowski in the second half of a Buccaneers 31–3 victory in September 1992. With the hiring of Tony Dungy as coach in 1996 and the development of the trademark Tampa 2 defense led by Warren Sapp, the Buccaneers went to the playoffs five out of six seasons between 1997 and 2002, culminating in a victory in Super Bowl XXXVII. It was during this time that Favre and Sapp developed a personal rivalry that was representative of the larger team rivalry. Even with both teams seeing success, the Packers dominated the rivalry during the 1990s, winning 16 out of 21 match-ups, including a 21–7 victory in the divisional round of the 1997–98 NFL playoffs. It was during the 1990s that the Packers had the longest winning streak of the rivalry, winning six straight games twice (from 1992 to 1995 and from 1996 to 1998). Shortly after the playoff loss in 1998, the Orlando Sentinel opined that "the Green Bay Packers have become the Bucs’ biggest rival".

=== Post realignment (2002–present) ===
After the Buccaneers moved divisions, the rivalry has become less pronounced. The teams only played each other nine times in the 2000s and only three times in the 2010s. Although the Packers continued having success under Brett Favre and then Aaron Rodgers during this period, the Buccaneers only made the playoffs twice between 2003 and 2019. From 2002 to 2021, the Packers made the playoffs 15 times, including a victory in Super Bowl XLV. The victory in Super Bowl XLV came after the Packers, Buccaneers and New York Giants all ended the season with the same record, 10–6; the Packers made the playoffs based on tie-breakers. The Buccaneers fortunes changed though after signing quarterback Tom Brady for the 2020 NFL season; the Buccaneers won Super Bowl LV after beating the Packers 38–10 in the regular season and then again in a 31–26 victory in the 2020 NFC Championship Game. The most recent game in the rivalry was a 17–14 regular season victory for the Packers during the 2026 NFL season.

=== Notable games ===
- Packers 13, Buccaneers 0 (October 23, 1977) – The Buccaneers and Packers met at Tampa Stadium for their inaugural match-up. The Buccaneers had just completed their first season winless and were 0–5 to start the 1977 NFL season. The Packers were not much better, winning the first game of the season but then losing 4 straight for a record of 1–4. The Packers defense shut out the Buccaneers 13–0, recording three interceptions and one blocked punt, handing the Buccaneers their 20th consecutive loss. Packers running back Eric Torkelson scored the only touchdown of the game, rushing for a five-yard score in the third quarter after kicker Chester Marcol kicked two field goals in the first half. The Buccaneers would go on to lose their first 26 games as an organization before securing their first victory against the New Orleans Saints near the end of the season. After their win, the Packers would go on a five-game losing streak and end the season with a record of 4–10.
- Buccaneers 14, Packers 14 (OT) (October 12, 1980) – The Buccaneers and Packers played to their first and—as of 2023—only tie of the series. Packers quarterback Lynn Dickey threw for 418 yards on 51 pass attempts and the Packers rushed for 154 yards as a team. However, two interceptions by Dickey prevented the Packers from taking control of the game. One of the interceptions was returned 55 yards for a touchdown in the 2nd quarter by linebacker Richard Wood. Buccaneers quarterback Doug Williams had a poor performance passing, completing only six passes on 24 pass attempts for 103 yards. However, Williams scored on a 5-yard rush late in the fourth quarter to bring the score even. With neither team scoring in overtime, the game ended in a tie. Newly signed Packers placekicker Tom Birney missed two short field goals, one right before the end of the fourth quarter and another at the end of overtime that would have put the Packers in the lead. As of the 2025 NFL season, this is the only tie in the Buccaneers franchise history.
- Packers 21, Buccaneers 0 (December 1, 1985) – Known as the "Snow Bowl", the game was notable less for what happened on the field and more for the weather. A foot of snow fell before the game, with another four inches falling during the game; with gusts of wind in the range of 30 miles per hour, the wind chill factor was close to zero degrees. This led to over 36,000 fans not being able to attend the game, even though it was a sell-out. The Buccaneers wore their white away-game jerseys, which made it difficult to see the players through the snow. The Packers dominated the Buccaneers, even though they had four turnovers. The Packers defense held the Buccaneers to just 65 yards during the whole game, while the Packers offense gained 512 yards. Packers defensive end Alphonso Carreker sacked Buccaneers quarterback and future Pro Football Hall of Fame enshrinee Steve Young four times.

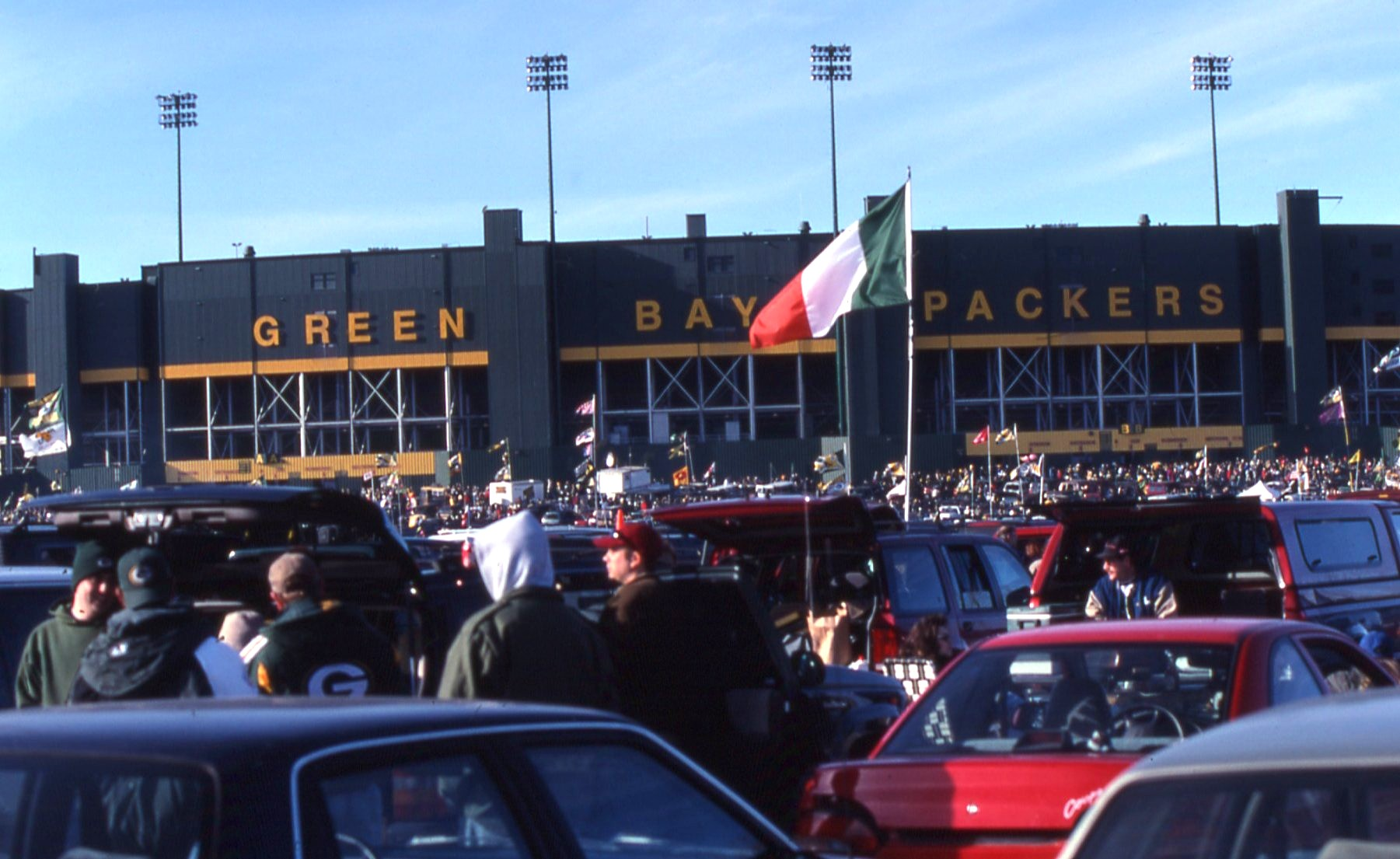
Lambeau Field, shown here in 1998, was the site of the rivalry's first playoff game

- Packers 21, Buccaneers 7 (January 4, 1998) – The Buccaneers and Packers met for their first playoff match-up in the divisional round of the 1997–98 NFL playoffs. The Packers had gone 13–3 during the regular season, good for the second seed and a first-round bye alongside the first seed San Francisco 49ers. The Buccaneers made the playoffs via a wild card spot and beat the Detroit Lions 20–10 in the first week of the playoffs. The Packers had beaten the Buccaneers twice during the regular season. The Packers, led by 112 rushing yards and a touchdown by Dorsey Levens, took control of the game early after a blocked field goal attempt and never relinquished the lead. The Buccaneers were only able to muster one scoring drive which culminated in a Mike Alstott rushing touchdown in the third quarter. However, Buccaneers quarterback Trent Dilfer only completed 11 of 36 passes and was intercepted twice during the game. Packers quarterback Brett Favre had an uneven game, with a passing touchdown and rushing for a two-point conversion. However, his wide receivers dropped six passes, including two passes that would have likely scored a touchdown. The Packers would go on to beat the 49ers in the NFC Championship game, reaching their second straight Super Bowl, a loss to the Denver Broncos.
- Buccaneers 31, Packers 26 (January 24, 2021) – Prior to the 2020 NFL season, the Buccaneers signed quarterback Tom Brady after he completed his 20th season with the New England Patriots. Brady led the Buccaneers to a record of 11–5 and a Wild Card berth into the playoffs. Led by quarterback Aaron Rodgers and 2nd-year head coach Matt LaFleur, the Packers finished the 2020 season with a record of 13–3, clinching the first seed in the playoffs and a bye during the first week of the playoffs. Both teams won in the playoffs and met for 2020 NFC Championship Game. This was their second match-up of the season; the Buccaneers handed the Packers their first loss of the season in a 38–10 blowout in Week 6. The teams traded scores through the first two quarters, with the Buccaneers up 14–10 right before the end of the first half. However, instead of trying to set themselves up for a field goal, the Buccaneers threw a deep pass to wide receiver Scotty Miller, who caught a 39-yard touchdown pass to end the half, putting the Buccaneers up 21–10. The Buccaneers would score again in the first few minutes of the third quarter to go up 28–10. However, the Packers responded with two touchdown passes by Rodgers. A failed two-point conversion brought the score to 28–23 going into the fourth quarter. Buccaneers kicker Ryan Succop converted a field goal with five minutes left in the game to put the Buccaneers up 31–23. The Packers drove down quickly to the 8-yard line, with a first and goal. However, three straight incompletions led to a 4th and goal; coach Lafleur decided to kick a field goal with 2:05 left on the clock and all three timeouts. Kicker Mason Crosby converted the field goal to bring the score to 31–26 and kicked off the ball to the Buccaneers. The Buccaneers converted three first downs, including a controversial holding penalty on cornerback Kevin King, and ran out the clock for the victory. The Buccaneers would go on to beat the Kansas City Chiefs in Super Bowl LV.

== Game results ==
As of the 2026 NFL season, the Buccaneers and Packers have played each other 60 times, with the Packers leading the all-time series 35–24–1. The Packers lead the all-time series 20–9 when they are the home team, while the teams are tied 15–15–1 when the Buccaneers are the home team. The Buccaneers and Packers have played each other twice in the postseason, with both games being at Lambeau Field. The Packers won the first postseason match-up, while the Buccaneers won the second. The following game results are up-to-date as of the 2026 NFL season.

Tampa Bay Buccaneers vs. Green Bay Packers Season-by-Season Results
1970s (Packers, 3–2)

Season	Results	Location	Overall series	Notes
1977	Packers; 13–0	Tampa Stadium	Packers; 1–0	First meeting between the two teams and first at Tampa Stadium
1978	Packers; 9–7	Lambeau Field	Packers; 2–0	First meeting at Lambeau Field
1978	Packers; 17–7	Tampa Stadium	Packers; 3–0	
1979	Buccaneers; 21–10	Lambeau Field	Packers; 3–1	
1979	Buccaneers; 21–3	Tampa Stadium	Packers; 3–2	

1980s (Tied, 8–8–1)

Season	Results	Location	Overall series	Notes
1980	Tie; 14–14 (OT)	Tampa Stadium	Packers; 3–2–1	First and only tie
1980	Buccaneers; 20–17	Milwaukee County Stadium	Tied; 3–3–1	First match-up at Milwaukee County Stadium
1981	Buccaneers; 21–10	Lambeau Field	Buccaneers; 4–3–1	
1981	Buccaneers; 37–3	Tampa Stadium	Buccaneers; 5–3–1	
1983	Packers; 55–14	Lambeau Field	Buccaneers; 5–4–1	
1983	Packers; 12–9 (OT)	Tampa Stadium	Tie; 5–5–1	
1984	Buccaneers; 30–27 (OT)	Tampa Stadium	Buccaneers; 6–5–1	
1984	Packers; 27–14	Lambeau Field	Tie; 6–6–1	
1985	Packers; 21–0	Lambeau Field	Packers; 7–6–1	Game known as the Snow Bowl
1985	Packers; 20–17	Tampa Stadium	Packers; 8–6–1	
1986	Packers; 31–7	Milwaukee County Stadium	Packers; 9–6–1	
1986	Packers; 21–7	Tampa Stadium	Packers; 10–6–1	
1987	Buccaneers; 23–17	Milwaukee County Stadium	Packers; 10–7–1	Game #1 of the 1987 season was not held due to the 1987 strike
1988	Buccaneers; 13–10	Lambeau Field	Packers; 10–8–1	
1988	Buccaneers; 27–24	Tampa Stadium	Packers; 10–9–1	
1989	Buccaneers; 23–21	Lambeau Field	Tie; 10–10–1	
1989	Packers; 17–16	Tampa Stadium	Packers; 11–10–1	

1990s (Packers, 16–5)

Season	Results	Location	Overall series	Notes
1990	Buccaneers; 26–14	Tampa Stadium	Tied; 11–11–1	
1990	Packers; 20–10	Milwaukee County Stadium	Packers; 12–11–1	
1991	Packers; 15–13	Lambeau Field	Packers; 13–11–1	
1991	Packers; 27–0	Tampa Stadium	Packers; 14–11–1	
1992	Buccaneers; 31–3	Tampa Stadium	Packers; 14–12–1	
1992	Packers; 19–14	Milwaukee County Stadium	Packers; 15–12–1	Last match-up at Milwaukee County Stadium
1993	Packers; 37–14	Tampa Stadium	Packers; 16–12–1	
1993	Packers; 13–10	Lambeau Field	Packers; 17–12–1	
1994	Packers; 30–3	Lambeau Field	Packers; 18–12–1	
1994	Packers; 34–19	Tampa Stadium	Packers; 19–12–1	
1995	Packers; 35–13	Lambeau Field	Packers; 20–12–1	
1995	Buccaneers; 13–10 (OT)	Tampa Stadium	Packers; 20–13–1	
1996	Packers; 34–3	Tampa Stadium	Packers; 21–13–1	
1996	Packers; 13–7	Lambeau Field	Packers; 22–13–1	
1997	Packers; 21–16	Lambeau Field	Packers; 23–13–1	
1997	Packers; 17–6	Tampa Stadium	Packers; 24–13–1	Last match-up at Tampa Stadium
1997 Playoffs	Packers; 21–7	Lambeau Field	Packers; 25–13–1	First playoff match-up; Packers lose Super Bowl XXXII
1998	Packers; 23–15	Lambeau Field	Packers; 26–13–1	
1998	Buccaneers; 24–22	Raymond James Stadium	Packers; 26–14–1	First match-up at Raymond James Stadium
1999	Packers; 26–23	Lambeau Field	Packers; 27–14–1	
1999	Buccaneers; 29–10	Tampa Stadium	Packers; 27–15–1	

2000s (Buccaneers, 6–3)

Season	Results	Location	Overall series	Notes
2000	Buccaneers; 20–15	Raymond James Stadium	Packers; 27–16–1	
2000	Packers; 17–14 (OT)	Lambeau Field	Packers; 28–16–1	
2001	Buccaneers; 14–10	Raymond James Stadium	Packers; 28–17–1	
2001	Packers; 21–20	Lambeau Field	Packers; 29–17–1	
2002	Buccaneers; 21–7	Raymond James Stadium	Packers; 29–18–1	Buccaneers win Super Bowl XXXVII
2003	Packers; 20–13	Raymond James Stadium	Packers; 30–18–1	
2005	Buccaneers; 17–16	Lambeau Field	Packers; 30–19–1	
2008	Buccaneers; 30–21	Raymond James Stadium	Packers; 30–20–1	
2009	Buccaneers; 38–28	Raymond James Stadium	Packers; 30–21–1	

2010s (Packers, 3–0)

Season	Results	Location	Overall series	Notes
2011	Packers; 35–26	Lambeau Field	Packers; 30–22–1	
2014	Packers; 20–3	Raymond James Stadium	Packers; 31–22–1	
2017	Packers; 26–20 (OT)	Lambeau Field	Packers; 32–22–1	

2020s (Buccaneers, 3–1)

Season	Results	Location	Overall series	Notes
2020	Buccaneers; 38–10	Raymond James Stadium	Packers; 33–22–1	
2020 Playoffs	Buccaneers; 31–26	Lambeau Field	Packers; 33–23–1	First NFC Championship Game between the two teams. Buccaneers win Super Bowl LV on their home field.
2022	Packers; 14–12	Raymond James Stadium	Packers; 34–23–1	
2023	Buccaneers; 34–20	Lambeau Field	Packers; 34–24–1	
2026	Packers; 17–14	Raymond James Stadium	Packers; 35–24–1	

Summary of Results

Season	Season series	at Green Bay Packers	at Tampa Bay Buccaneers	Notes
Regular season	Packers 35–24–1	Packers 19–8	Tied 15–15–1	
Postseason	Tied 1–1	Tied 1–1	—	NFC Divisional Round: 1998; NFC Championship Game: 2020
Regular and postseason	Packers 35–24–1	Packers 20–9	Tied 15–15–1	

== See also ==
- NFL rivalries
