= 2020 NFC Championship Game =

2021 American football postseason game

Tampa Bay Buccaneers (5) (11–5)	Green Bay Packers (1) (13–3)
31	26
Head coach: Bruce Arians	Head coach: Matt LaFleur
	1	2	3	4	Total
TB	7	14	7	3	31
GB	0	10	13	3	26
- Date: January 24, 2021
- Stadium: Lambeau Field; Green Bay, Wisconsin, U.S.
- Favorite: Packers by 3.5
- Referee: Clete Blakeman
- Attendance: 7,772

TV in the United States
- Network: Fox
- Announcers: Joe Buck, Troy Aikman, Erin Andrews and Tom Rinaldi

The 2020 National Football Conference (NFC) Championship Game was an American football game played between the Tampa Bay Buccaneers and the Green Bay Packers on January 24, 2021, at Lambeau Field in Green Bay, Wisconsin, United States. After signing quarterback Tom Brady and trading for tight end Rob Gronkowski, the Buccaneers went 11–5 and made the playoffs as a Wild Card team. The Packers finished the season with a record of 13–3 for the second straight season, good enough for the first seed and a first-round bye in the playoffs. The Buccaneers beat the Washington Football Team 31–23 in the Wild Card round and then beat the New Orleans Saints 30–20 in the Divisional round. After their first round bye, the Packers beat the Los Angeles Rams 32–18 in the Divisional round.

As the first seed, the Packers had home field advantage and hosted the Buccaneers in the NFC Championship Game. The Buccaneers took a 21–10 lead into halftime after Brady connected with Scotty Miller for a 39-yard touchdown pass right before the end of the half. The Buccaneers extended their lead to 28–10 at the beginning of the third quarter, before Aaron Rodgers led two consecutive touchdown drives to bring the score to 28–23 (after their second touchdown, the Packers failed at a two-point conversion). In the fourth quarter, the Buccaneers made a field goal to increase their lead to eight points. After driving down close to the end zone with over two minutes left in the game, Packers coach Matt LaFleur decided to kick a field goal and hope for his defense to get the ball back. After a controversial penalty on Kevin King, the Buccaneers were able to run out the clock and secure their berth in Super Bowl LV, where they would go on to beat the Kansas City Chiefs 31–9. The game helped rekindle a historic rivalry between the two teams.

== Background ==
After the 2019 NFL season, quarterback Tom Brady announced he would not be returning to the New England Patriots, ending his 20-year tenure with the team. Just a few days later, the Tampa Bay Buccaneers signed Brady to a two-year deal. The next month, Rob Gronkowski, who retired after the 2018 NFL season, announced he would be returning to the NFL. Gronkowski, who played with Brady for his entire career with the Patriots, was traded to the Buccaneers. The team finished the season with a record of 11–5, good enough to secure a Wild Card spot and the fifth seed in the playoffs. After their bye week, they won their last four games of the regular season to secure their playoff spot. In Brady's first season with the Buccaneers, he threw for more than 4,600 yards and 40 touchdown passes, with 7 of those touchdown passes going to Gronkowski. The Washington Commanders (known at the time as the Washington Football Team) hosted the Buccaneers in the Wild Card round. The Buccaneers beat Washington 31–23 to advance to the Divisional Round of the playoffs. The Buccaneers, again as the road team, beat their division rival the New Orleans Saints 30–20 in their Divisional Round game, earning them a berth into the NFC Championship Game.

The Green Bay Packers, coming off a loss to the San Francisco 49ers in the 2019 NFC Championship Game, started their second season under head coach Matt LaFleur by winning their first four games. However, after a Week 5 bye, the Packers suffered their first defeat, 38–10, to the Buccaneers, in Week 6. In that game, the Packers scored the first 10 points, then gave up 38 unanswered points, with Aaron Rodgers throwing two interceptions and the Packers defense giving up over 120 yards rushing to Ronald Jones II. The Packers would lose two more games over the next five weeks before winning their last six games of the year to secure the first seed in the playoffs with a record of 13–3. After their first-round bye in the playoffs, the Packers hosted the Los Angeles Rams in the Divisional Round. The Packers beat the Rams 32–18 with Rodgers throwing for almost 300 yards and 2 touchdowns. As the first seed in the playoffs, the Packers earned home-field advantage and thus would host the Buccaneers at Lambeau Field for the NFC Championship on January 24, 2021, with the winner earning the right to play in Super Bowl LV. The game occurred during the COVID-19 pandemic, which decreased the crowd size to just under 8,000; Lambeau Field's capacity is around 80,000. Although historic rivals, the Buccaneers and Packers had only met once before in the playoffs in a 1997 Divisional Round game. The Packers entered the NFC Championship game as 3.5 point favorites.

== Game summary ==
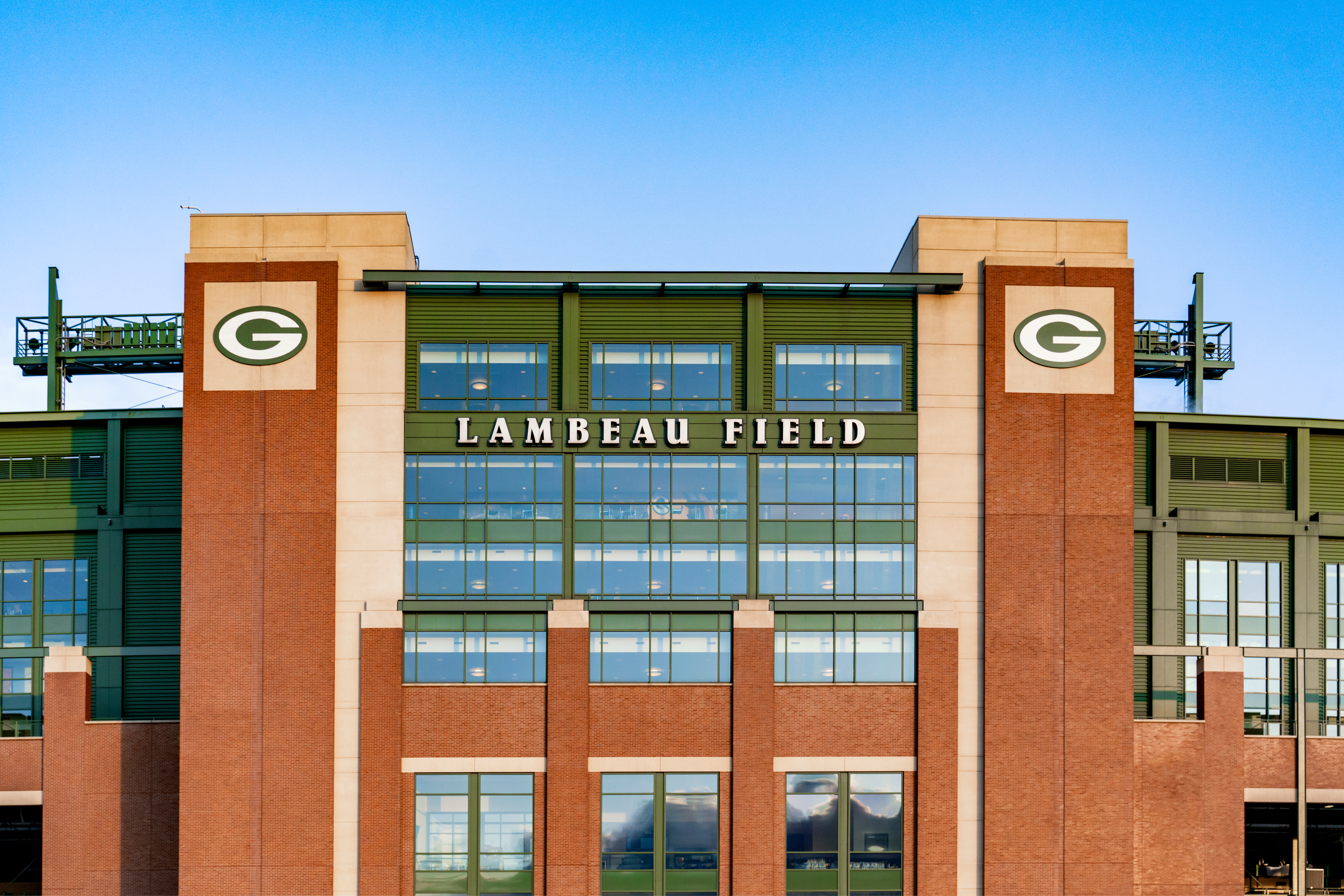
Lambeau Field, shown here in 2019, was the site of the NFC Championship Game.

=== First half ===
The Buccaneers began the game with the ball and drove down the field on a nine play, 60-yard drive that ended in a 15-yard touchdown pass from Brady to Mike Evans. The Packers and the Buccaneers exchanged punts before the Packers tied the game 7–7 on a 90-yard drive punctuated by a 50-yard touchdown pass from Rodgers to Marquez Valdes-Scantling on third down. In response, Brady connected with Chris Godwin for a 52-yard catch and Leonard Fournette scored a touchdown from 20 yards out. The Packers responded with a field goal drive after they were stopped on third and goal at the six-yard line. With the score at 14–10, the Buccaneers punted the ball back to the Packers. However, on the fifth play of the drive, Rodgers was intercepted near mid-field with just over 30 seconds left in the first half. After converting on fourth down, the Buccaneers had first down at the 39-yard line with 1 second left until halftime. Brady threw a deep pass to Scotty Miller, who caught the ball for a touchdown, increasing the Buccaneers' lead to 21–10.

=== Second half ===
On the Packers first drive of the second half, Aaron Jones fumbled the ball, which the Buccaneers recovered on the eight-yard line. On the ensuing play, Brady connected with Cameron Brate for a touchdown pass, increasing the Buccaneers lead to 28–10. Down 18 points, the Packers responded with a quick scoring drive, with Rodgers completing five passes for 68 yards, concluding with an 8-yard touchdown catch by Robert Tonyan. On the next drive, the Packers intercepted a deep pass by Brady. They drove down for another touchdown with a short pass from Rodgers to Davante Adams. The two-point conversion failed, leaving the score at 28–23. The Packers intercepted Brady for the second consecutive drive, again on a deep pass intended for Evans. The Packers punted after a three-and-out, and for a third consecutive drive the Packers intercepted Brady on a deep pass intended for Evans. The Packers had another three-and-out, punting back to the Buccaneers. The Buccaneers drove 44 yards to get into field goal range, which Ryan Succop converted to increase the lead to 31–23. With just under five minutes left in the game, the Packers drove down to the Buccaneer eight-yard line and had a first down and goal. Rodgers though threw three consecutive incompletions; instead of going for the tie on fourth down (which would have required a touchdown and two-point conversion), the Packers settled for a field goal to decrease the Buccaneers lead to five points. The Buccaneers got the ball with just over two minutes left in the game. The Buccaneers converted three first downs, including one via a penalty, to run out the rest of the clock and secure the 31–26 victory.

=== Box score ===
Tampa Bay Buccaneers vs. Green Bay Packers – Game Summary

Quarter	1	2	3	4	Total
Buccaneers	7	14	7	3	31
Packers	0	10	13	3	26

at Lambeau Field, Green Bay, Wisconsin

- Date: January 24, 2021
- Game time: 2:05 p.m. CST
- Game weather: Sunny, 29 °F (−2 °C)
- Game attendance: 7,772 (Note: Attendance at the game was limited to 9,000 due to the COVID-19 pandemic in Wisconsin.)
- Referee: Clete Blakeman
- TV announcers (Fox): Joe Buck, Troy Aikman, Erin Andrews and Tom Rinaldi
- Sources: ESPN.com and Pro-Football-Reference.com

Game information

First quarter

- TB – Mike Evans 15-yard pass from Tom Brady (Ryan Succop kick), 10:59. Buccaneers 7–0. Drive: 9 plays, 66 yards, 4:01.

Second quarter

- GB – Marquez Valdes-Scantling 50-yard pass from Aaron Rodgers (Mason Crosby kick), 14:07. Tied 7–7. Drive: 7 plays, 90 yards, 3:42.
- TB – Leonard Fournette 20-yard run (Ryan Succop kick), 12:24. Buccaneers 14–7. Drive: 4 plays, 73 yards, 1:43.
- GB – Mason Crosby 24-yard field goal, 4:59. Buccaneers 14–10. Drive: 15 plays, 69 yards, 7:25.
- TB – Scotty Miller 39-yard pass from Tom Brady (Ryan Succop kick), 0:01. Buccaneers 21–10. Drive: 5 plays, 51 yards, 0:27.

Third quarter

- TB – Cameron Brate 8-yard pass from Tom Brady (Ryan Succop kick), 13:54. Buccaneers 28–10. Drive: 1 play, 8 yards, 0:04.
- GB – Robert Tonyan 8-yard pass from Aaron Rodgers (Mason Crosby kick), 9:28. Buccaneers 28–17. Drive: 8 plays, 75 yards, 4:26.
- GB – Davante Adams 2-yard pass from Aaron Rodgers (pass failed), 0:24. Buccaneers 28–23. Drive: 13 plays, 68 yards, 7:30.

Fourth quarter

- TB – Ryan Succop 46-yard field goal, 4:42. Buccaneers 31–23. Drive: 8 plays, 44 yards, 3:28.
- GB – Mason Crosby 26-yard field goal, 2:05. Buccaneers 31–26. Drive: 9 plays, 58 yards, 2:37.

Tampa Bay Buccaneers stats

Passing

- Tom Brady – 20/36, 280 yards, 3 touchdowns, 3 interceptions

Rushing

- Leonard Fournette – 12 rushes, 55 yards, 1 touchdown
- Ronald Jones II – 10 rushes, 16 yards
- Chris Godwin – 1 rush, 6 yards
- Tom Brady – 1 rush, -1 yards

Receiving

- Chris Godwin – 5 receptions, 110 yards
- Leonard Fournette – 5 reception, 19 yards
- Mike Evans – 3 receptions, 51 yards, 1 touchdown
- Cameron Brate – 3 receptions, 19 yards, 1 touchdown
- Scotty Miller – 2 receptions, 36 yards, 1 touchdown
- Rob Gronkowski – 1 reception, 29 yards
- Tyler Johnson – 1 reception, 16 yards
Green Bay Packers stats

Passing

- Aaron Rodgers – 33/48, 346 yards, 3 touchdowns, 1 interception

Rushing

- Aaron Jones – 6 rushes, 27 yards
- Jamaal Williams – 7 rushes, 23 yards
- A. J. Dillon – 3 rushes, 17 yards

Receiving

- Jordy Nelson – 5 receptions, 71 yards
- Randall Cobb – 7 receptions, 62 yards, 1 touchdown
- Richard Rodgers – 4 receptions, 35 yards
- Davante Adams – 1 reception, 7 yards
- John Kuhn – 1 reception, 3 yards
- James Starks – 1 reception, 0 yards

=== Analysis ===
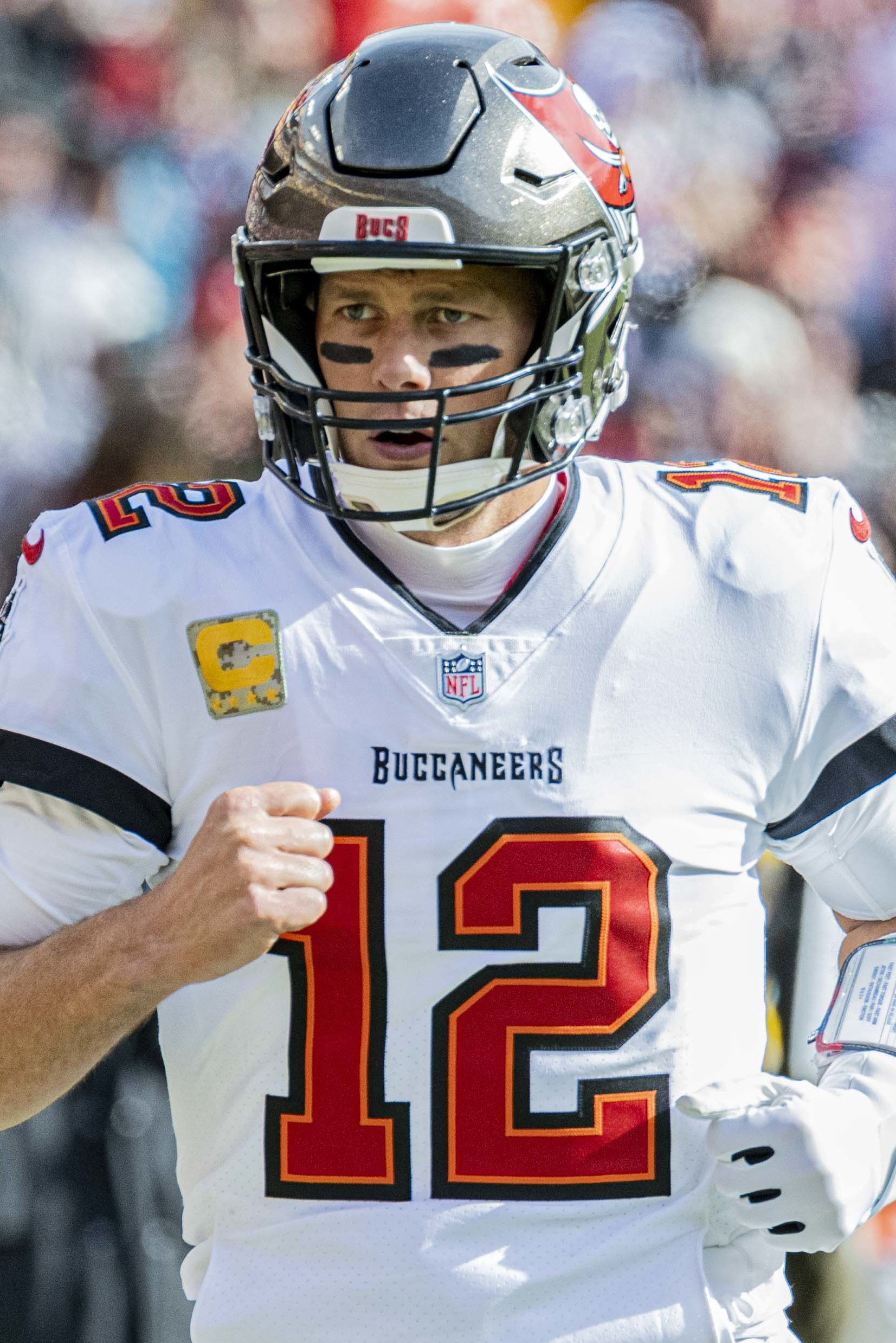
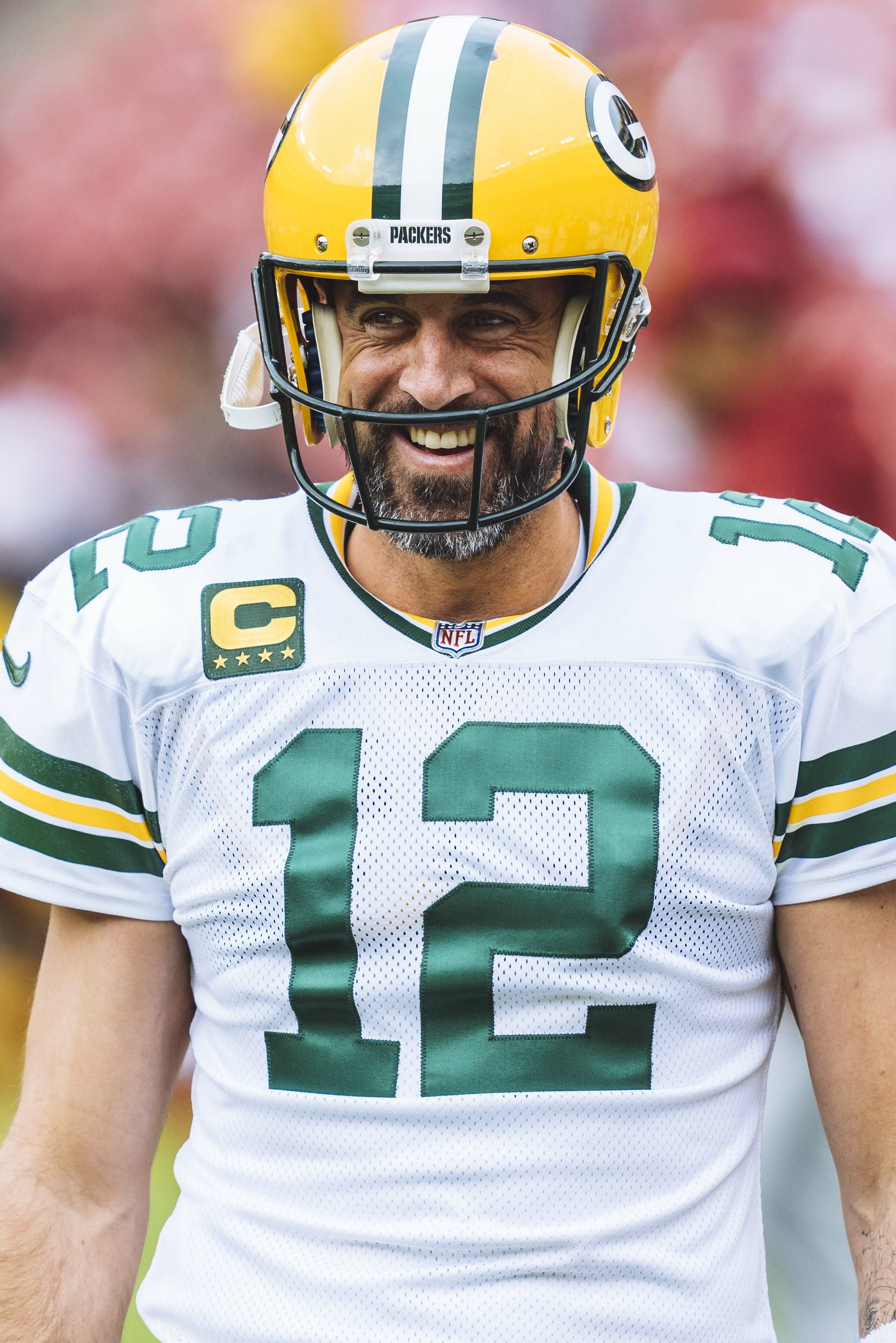
Tom Brady (left) and Aaron Rodgers (right) both had productive games, each throwing for three touchdowns a piece.

Post-game analysis focused on the competitive nature of the game, individual performances and coaching. Both quarterbacks had solid performances, with Brady and Rodgers passing for three touchdowns a piece, and each team had 100 yard receivers, with Valdez-Scantling going for 115 yards and Godwin going for 110 yards. Both defenses forced turnovers, with the Packers intercepting Brady on three straight drives and the Buccaneers intercepting Rodgers once and forcing a Jones fumble on another drive. Neither team took full advantage taking the ball away though, with each team only scoring seven points off of turnovers. The Packers were especially criticized for not taking advantage of their interceptions, with two drives ending in three-and-outs after intercepting Brady. The defense and coaching was also criticized for allowing the long touchdown pass at the end of the first half. This criticism was of the coaching for not playing appropriate coverage, as well as the performance of Kevin King, who allowed Miller to get behind him on a play that was obviously intended for the end zone. King was also called for a controversial defensive pass interference penalty on third down during the Buccaneers' last drive that prevented the Packers from getting the ball back.

The Buccaneers defense was recognized for pressuring Rodgers during the game while sacking him five times. LaFleur's decision not to go for it on fourth down, down by eight points with only a few minutes left in the game, was criticized as too conservative. Although the field goal, which was successful, gave the Packers an opportunity to win, it only did so if the Packers defense could force a punt or turnover. Had the Packers gone for it on fourth down and not been successful, the team still would have been required to force a punt or turnover. The criticism focused on LaFleur's decision not to depend on the offense in a key moment and instead rely on a defense that, notwithstanding the three interceptions, had otherwise allowed over 350 total yards and 31 points up to that point. LaFleur defended his decision by stating his belief in the defense, the challenge of scoring on fourth down while also succeeding at the two-point conversion and his desire to give his team the opportunity to win the game and not settle for a tie and overtime.

== Outcome ==
With the victory, Brady became just the second quarterback to lead a team to a Super Bowl from both the NFC and American Football Conference (AFC). The Buccaneers advanced to Super Bowl LV, where they played against the Kansas City Chiefs. The Buccaneers beat the Chiefs 31–9, giving the Buccaneers their second NFL Championship. All of the Buccaneers' playoff victories were on the road, just the fifth team to achieve that feat. After their victory in the Super Bowl, the Buccaneers became the first team to play and win a Super Bowl in their home stadium.

=== Legacy ===
The game was well known for its competitive nature, as well as the impact on both quarterbacks. For Brady, the victory gave him his 10th Super Bowl appearance of his career. For Rodgers, it was his and the Packers fourth straight loss in the NFC Championship Game since the 2010 NFL season, when they won Super Bowl XLV. It also marked back-to-back losses in the Conference Championship Game. The loss made Rodgers "the first quarterback in NFL history to lose four straight NFC Championship Games" and lowered his overall Conference Championship Games record to 1–4. The game continued the historic rivalry between the two teams.
