= List of NFL rivalries =

Overview of rivalries in the National Football League

As with all sports leagues, there are several significant rivalries between teams and notable players in the National Football League (NFL). Rivalries are occasionally created due to a particular event that causes bad blood between teams, players, coaches, or owners, but for the most part, they arise simply due to the frequency with which some teams play each other and sometimes exist for geographic reasons.

Rivalries in the NFL are commonly recognized as such by fans and players alike. While many rivalries are well established, others are of more recent vintage, accepted as existing by the nature of the competition and history between the two teams. Other rivalries have fallen by the wayside due to league realignment and a reduction in frequency of meetings. Many modern rivalries are formed simply due to the two teams being within the same division.

== Foundation ==
Purely geographic rivalries are rare in the NFL, since crosstown rivals do not play each other nearly as often as in other leagues that have more games and place teams closest to each other into the same divisions (and therefore more opportunities to play other teams).

For example, until the 2022 season, Major League Baseball teams face each league opponent at least six times in the regular season, and within a division as many as 19 times, while the National Hockey League scheduling policies in the 21st century ensured at least eight games (out of 82) with division rivals and ensured the two areas with multiple teams (New York and Los Angeles) had all of the teams in one area in the same division. In recent years, the NFL changed its scheduling formula to ensure every possible matchup happens within four years, excluding pre-season games or the Super Bowl.

A main factor in the fact that crosstown rivals are almost always in opposing conferences is because of history: in the two current markets (New York/New Jersey and Los Angeles) that have two NFL teams, both have one team that was a member of the American Football League (the Jets in New York/New Jersey and Chargers in Los Angeles).

As part of the AFL–NFL merger, all AFL teams had to be retained, even if it meant multiple teams in one metropolitan area: this was not a major issue, as the Raiders and San Francisco 49ers served separate parts of their metropolitan areas separated by San Francisco Bay, and the New York market, the most populous in the United States, supported two or more NFL teams through the 1930s and 1940s. Only in Los Angeles, which was home to the Rams until the Raiders relocated there in 1982, coincidentally; both teams endured poor ownership and financial issues contributing to their relocation in 1995.

The newly merged league opted not to go through an extensive geographical realignment: instead, the AFL formed most of the AFC, with a few existing NFL teams joining the new AFC and the rest of the old NFL forming the basis of the NFC. As a result, each team ended up in an opposite conference from their crosstown rival. This allowed the combined league to retain both existing television partnerships of each league (NBC for the AFL/AFC, and CBS for the NFL/NFC) instead of choosing one or the other (ABC joined the mix in 1970 with Monday Night Football, thus giving all of the Big Three television networks NFL rights and effectively shutting out any further potential competitors).

NFL policy currently requires any teams who play in the same metropolitan area to play in opposite conferences: in the event of any relocation causing two teams from the same conference to share a metropolitan area, one of the two teams must move to the other conference.

=== Categories ===
==== Division rivals ====
Games between opponents in the same NFL division. Since 2002, there are 32 teams in eight divisions of four teams each. Each team plays each division opponent twice in the regular season (once at home, once away) for a total of six regular season games out of 17 total. Occasionally, two teams will play three times in a year if they meet again in the playoffs. The Chiefs, Colts, Cowboys, Packers, Dolphins, and Steelers are the only teams with winning records against all of their current division rivals for rivalries going back at least 20 years. Conversely, the Browns, Chargers, Jaguars, Lions, and Jets are the only teams with a losing record against all of their current division rivals for rivalries going back at least 20 years.

==== Conference rivals ====
Teams do not play a given conference opponent from outside their division more than once during the regular season. However, they may meet again in the playoffs. The NFL schedules divisions to play against each other on a rotating basis, so that every team from one division will play every team from another division, for a total of four games per team. Each team will also play one team from each of the remaining two divisions within the conference that finished in the same divisional standing position in the prior year, for a total of 96 intra-conference games. Conference games are often important, as a team's record in common games, as well as its overall record against its conference, is sometimes used as a tiebreaker for playoff seeding at the end of the regular season. Also, many regular season opponents have met again in the playoffs, and the result of a regular season game can affect where the playoff game will be played. Conference rivals will play each other at least once every three years in the regular season, and as frequently as once every year depending on record, and can play each other in the preseason. Furthermore, the league also schedules divisional pairings games on a six-year cycle so any particular team will both host and visit any given team in a paired division/conference within six years.

==== Inter-conference ====
Teams do not play a given inter-conference opponent more than once during the season unless they are to meet up in the Super Bowl. The NFL schedules inter-conference divisions to play each other exactly once on a rotating basis within a four-year cycle, or as frequently as once every two years depending on record since the 2021 NFL season. For instance, given the 2012 NFL season as a reference, the NFC East played the AFC North during the 2012 season, then the AFC West during the 2013 season, the AFC South during the 2014 season, and finally the AFC East in the 2015 season before repeating the cycle. The league also schedules inter-conference games on an eight-year cycle so any particular team will both host and visit any given team in the league within eight years. Inter-conference rivals may play each other more frequently in the preseason, where no structured scheduling formula is used.

==== Historic ====
Certain rivalries had existed at various points in the league history across either conference, though some have ceased due to relocation, divisional realignment; or both.

== American Football Conference ==
=== AFC East ===
==== Buffalo Bills vs. Miami Dolphins ====
In the AFC East rivalry between the Buffalo Bills and Miami Dolphins, the two teams have played 106 regular season and playoff games, with the Dolphins having a 63–61–1 advantage. The intensity of the rivalry stems from the Dolphins winning 20 straight meetings in the 1970s, as well as the emergence of Hall-of-Fame quarterbacks Jim Kelly for Buffalo and Dan Marino for Miami in the 1980s and 1990s. It has re-emerged in the 2020s as the Josh Allen-led Bills and Tua Tagovailoa-led Dolphins have consistently competed for the division title, despite Allen holding a decisively winning record against Miami. The teams have also met five times in the NFL playoffs, with the Bills holding a 4–1 advantage, including a victory in the 1992 AFC Championship Game.

==== Buffalo Bills vs. New York Jets ====
This rivalry is not as fierce as other AFC East rivalries, as the two teams have rarely been competitive simultaneously. The rivalry briefly heated up when former Jets coach Rex Ryan was coaching for Buffalo from 2015 to 2016. The Bills lead the series 74–58. The Bills won the rivals' lone post-season meeting in the 1981 AFC Wild Card round.

==== Buffalo Bills vs. New England Patriots ====
During the Brady–Belichick era, this rivalry became one of the most lopsided in the league, with the Patriots controlling the series under quarterback Tom Brady. The Bills have since turned the corner after Brady's departure to Tampa Bay, winning 8 of 11 games afterwards with quarterback Josh Allen, including a 47–17 win in the 2021–22 NFL playoffs. Prior to the Brady era, Bills Hall of Fame quarterback Jim Kelly compiled a 12–8 career record against the Patriots. The Patriots currently lead 81–52–1. The teams have split their two playoff meetings, with the first one being a Patriots win following the 1963 AFL season.

==== Miami Dolphins vs. New York Jets ====
The Dolphins and Jets have often competed for divisional supremacy, and have played several classic games. This includes the game, known in NFL Lore as the Monday Night Miracle where the Jets erased a 30–7 lead after three quarters and won the game in overtime; as well as the famous Dan Marino fake spike game. The Dolphins lead the series at 64–57–1, while the Dolphins have won the only playoff meeting, the 1982 AFC Championship Game.

==== Miami Dolphins vs. New England Patriots ====
The Dolphins currently lead 64–58, but the Patriots lead the postseason series 2–1. The rivalry briefly heated up in 2005, when Patriots head coach Bill Belichick's former Browns assistant Nick Saban was hired as Dolphins head coach and when he nearly signed quarterback Drew Brees with the Dolphins, as well as in 2008 when the teams were battling for the top spot in the AFC East. These Dolphins won the division, making 2008 the only in 16 years in which New England did not win the AFC East. Both teams are also the only teams in the post-merger era to post undefeated regular season records, with the Dolphins doing so in 1972 and the Patriots in 2007, but only the Dolphins were able to win the Super Bowl. Recently, the Patriots have had the upper hand, posting a 26–13 record in the Tom Brady era.

==== New York Jets vs. New England Patriots ====
Games between the New York Jets and New England Patriots have often played out the fierce Red Sox–Yankees rivalry in Major League Baseball, as New York City and Boston are approximately 3½ hours apart by car. More recently, the Jets have tried to overcome the Patriots’ domination in the division and the conference, facing them in the playoffs twice in a five-season span. The Patriots defeated the Jets 37–16 in the 2006 playoffs, while the Jets won 28–21 in the 2010 playoffs. The series is in New England's favor, 78–56–1, which included a 15-game win streak. The Patriots have a playoff record of 2–1 against the Jets. Perhaps the most famous (or infamous) moment to come from this rivalry was in their game on November 22, 2012, when Jets quarterback Mark Sanchez ran into the rear end of offensive guard Brandon Moore and fumbled the ball, allowing New England to recover for a touchdown. Both the moment and the game as a whole have become known as the Butt Fumble, and it is frequently listed as one of the single most humiliating moments in the history of both the Jets as an organization and the entirety of professional gridiron football.

=== AFC North ===
==== Cincinnati Bengals vs. Cleveland Browns ====
This rivalry, often referred to as the "Battle of Ohio" started as the result of the first Browns head coach (and namesake) Paul Brown starting the Bengals franchise after being fired from the Browns. The colors of each team are similar since Paul Brown chose the exact shade of orange used by the Browns for the Bengals, and the Bengals' original uniforms were identical to the Browns' uniforms, excluding the word "Bengals" on the helmet. The rivalry reached its peak during the 1980s when both teams were vying viciously for a spot in the playoffs. During the 1990s the rivalry also butted heads when Brown's sons were in charge of the day-to-day operations of the Bengals. The Bengals lead the series 56–49.

==== Cincinnati Bengals vs. Baltimore Ravens ====
The Bengals–Ravens rivalry in the AFC North began when the Ravens relocated to Baltimore. Since then, the rivalry heated up when longtime Ravens defensive coordinator Marvin Lewis was hired as the head coach of the Bengals. The Ravens lead the all-time series 33–29. The Bengals won the only playoff meeting in the 2022 AFC Wild Card round.

==== Cincinnati Bengals vs. Pittsburgh Steelers ====
The two teams have played each other twice a year since becoming division rivals in 1970. This rivalry has gained intensity since the 2000s, as the teams have met twice in the playoffs, with both games being marked by hard hits and injuries with the most infamous example occurring in the 2005 playoffs. The Steelers lead the overall series 73–42 and the postseason series 2–0. There were two times that the rivalry has met during the playoffs: the Wild Card rounds of 2005 and 2015, with the Steelers winning both meetings at Cincinnati. The 2005 game is marked as a special time in the rivalry because this is when Steelers defensive tackle Kimo Von Oelhoffen injured Bengals quarterback Carson Palmer, while the 2015 game is also special because Bengals running back Jeremy Hill fumbled the ball in the waning minutes when the Bengals had a 16–15 lead over the Steelers to give the latter one last chance. They used that chance wisely as they drove down the field (with the help of two costly personal fouls by the Bengals) and kicked a game-winning field goal.

==== Cleveland Browns vs. Baltimore Ravens ====
The Browns–Ravens rivalry in the AFC North began when the Browns resumed operations in 1999, after suspending operations for three seasons after the original Browns moved to Baltimore and became the Ravens. The rivalry between the Browns and Ravens was more directed at former Browns owner Art Modell, who orchestrated the move, than the team itself, and has, by most Ravens fans, been simply considered a divisional game. The rivalry has been largely one-sided, as the Ravens hold a 39–16 series lead. The two teams have not met in the playoffs.

==== Cleveland Browns vs. Pittsburgh Steelers ====
The Browns–Steelers rivalry is one of the most storied in the American Football Conference and NFL. With 150 meetings and counting, it is the oldest rivalry in the AFC. The two divisional foes have a natural rivalry due to the commonalities between the cities. It is sometimes called the Turnpike Rivalry because the majority of driving route between the two cities are connected via the Pennsylvania and Ohio Turnpikes. The Steelers lead the series 84–66–1, including a 2–1 playoff record against Cleveland.

==== Baltimore Ravens vs. Pittsburgh Steelers ====
The Ravens–Steelers rivalry in the AFC North is one of the most intense in the NFL. The Ravens and Steelers often compete for divisional supremacy. They are also known for fielding tough, hard-hitting defensive squads, giving their games an extra element of physical intensity. The Steelers lead the series 38–27, including a 3–2 record in the playoffs. The two teams have combined for eight Super Bowl championships. CBS Sports ranked this rivalry as No. 2 of their best NFL rivalry of the 2000s.

=== AFC South ===
==== Indianapolis Colts vs. Jacksonville Jaguars ====
The rivalry between the Colts and Jaguars is relatively recent, having emerged with the establishment of the AFC South. The Colts have generally had the upper hand in this matchup, thanks in large part to the exceptional performances of quarterbacks Peyton Manning and Andrew Luck. Nevertheless, the Jaguars have managed to pull off notable upsets against the Colts, even when their overall team competitiveness has been lacking. Furthermore, since the inception of the AFC South, the Jaguars have achieved more victories against the Colts than both the Texans and Titans. However, the Colts lead the all-time series 28–23.

==== Indianapolis Colts vs. Houston Texans ====
In one of the newer rivalries in the NFL, the Colts and Texans have intensified their animosity in recent years. Despite Indianapolis dominating the AFC South and this particular series under quarterback Peyton Manning in the 2000s, Houston has recently provided more competition, winning the division five times since 2011. Indianapolis currently leads the series 34–16–1, including a win in the postseason in 2018.

==== Indianapolis Colts vs. Tennessee Titans ====
This rivalry stands as the most enduring in the AFC South, with a history of competition spanning over 20 years before the Jaguars and Texans were established, originally featuring the Baltimore Colts against the Houston Oilers. In the 2002 season, both teams were integrated into the newly formed AFC South as part of a league realignment, leading to a divisional rivalry. During the 2000s, the Titans and Colts frequently battled for the AFC South championship, with the Titans occasionally emerging as the sole team in the division to wrest the title from the Colts. However, in more recent years, the Colts have largely taken control of the rivalry, bolstered by the outstanding performances of quarterbacks Peyton Manning and Andrew Luck. In contrast, the 2020s have witnessed a resurgence in competitiveness from both teams as they compete for the divisional crown and playoff berths.

The Colts lead the overall series, 41–23. The two teams have met once in the playoffs, with the Titans winning 19–16 in the 2000 AFC Divisional playoff game.

==== Jacksonville Jaguars vs. Houston Texans ====
The Jaguars and Texans, which commenced play in 1995 and 2002 respectively, are among the most recently formed franchises in the NFL, emerging in the early 2000s. Notably, the Texans were established as the 32nd franchise in the league, prompting a realignment of the NFL divisions to establish eight divisions, each consisting of four teams. The Jaguars and Texans were placed in the AFC South. The Texans currently lead the all-time series versus the Jaguars, 33–16.

==== Jacksonville Jaguars vs. Tennessee Titans ====
This is a relatively new rivalry as the Jaguars did not begin play until 1995, A notable moment was the 1999 season, in which the Jaguars went 14–2, with both of their losses coming to the Titans. The Titans would beat the Jaguars for a third time in the AFC Championship Game, their only playoff meeting to date. The 1999 season was the match that ignited this rivalry with both teams topping the AFC that year, fueled further by allegations Titans defensive coordinator Gregg Williams had stolen the Jaguars playbook that season; and an interview where Titans head coach Jeff Fisher referred to the Jaguars stadium as a "second home field". The Titans lead the all-time series 35–29, including a 1–0 postseason record, which was the aforementioned 1999 AFC Championship Game.

==== Houston Texans vs. Tennessee Titans ====
This rivalry matches the old team representing Houston (the Titans, as the Houston Oilers) against the new team (the Texans). Though the Titans dominated the series early on, the Texans have made it more competitive as of late. A notable moment involved Texans receiver Andre Johnson and Titans cornerback Cortland Finnegan getting into a brawl during a 2010 matchup. The Texans lead the all-time series 25–24. The two teams have never met in the playoffs.

=== AFC West ===
==== Denver Broncos vs. Los Angeles Chargers ====
Broncos currently lead 75–58–1, including having won the only playoff meeting between the two teams, a 2013 AFC Divisional game.

==== Denver Broncos vs. Kansas City Chiefs ====
Chiefs currently lead 74–60, which included a run of 16 straight wins, but the Broncos won the only playoff game between the two teams, a 1997 AFC Divisional game.

==== Denver Broncos vs. Las Vegas Raiders ====
During the AFL days in the 1960s and up to 1976, the rivalry was very one-sided, with the Raiders going 26–6–2, including 14 straight wins from 1965–71. The Broncos defeated the Raiders in the 1977 AFC championship, en route to the first Super Bowl appearance. The Raiders won 13 out of 15 meetings from 1988–94 and held a 49–20–2 series lead by 1994. However, the Broncos reversed their fortunes against the Raiders when Mike Shanahan became the Broncos' head coach in 1995. Shanahan coached the Raiders in 1988 before being fired four games into the 1989 season and later became involved in a lengthy contract dispute with Raiders' owner Al Davis. The Broncos went 21–7 against Oakland during the 14 seasons that Shanahan coached the Broncos (1995–2008). The Raiders lead the series 73–58–2. The teams have met twice in the playoffs, with each team winning one game. Since 1970, they have been the most frequent matchup on Monday Night Football, with 20 matchups.

==== Los Angeles Chargers vs. Kansas City Chiefs ====
Chiefs currently lead 72–60–1, but the Chargers won the only playoff meeting between the two teams, a 1992 AFC wild card game.

==== Los Angeles Chargers vs. Las Vegas Raiders ====
The Chargers-Raiders rivalry dates to the 1963 season, when the Raiders defeated the heavily favored Chargers twice, both come-from-behind fourth-quarter victories. One of the most memorable games between these teams was the "Holy Roller" game in 1978, in which the Raiders intentionally fumbled to score a touchdown. This somewhat controversial play resulted in a rule change the following season. On November 22, 1982, the Raiders hosted their first Monday Night football game in Los Angeles against the Chargers. The Chargers led the game in the 1st half 24–0 until the Raiders scored 28 unanswered points in the second half to win 28–24. On January 9, 2022, the Raiders defeated the Chargers in overtime, 35–32. The winning field goal sent the Raiders to the playoffs and eliminated the Chargers. Had the game ended in a tie, both teams would have made the playoffs. The Raiders currently lead the series 70–62–2, including having won the only playoff game between the two teams, the 1980 AFC Championship game.

==== Kansas City Chiefs vs. Las Vegas Raiders ====
The Chiefs–Raiders rivalry is considered as one of the NFL's most bitter. Since the AFL was established in 1960, the Chiefs and Raiders have shared the same division, first being the AFL Western Conference, and since the AFL–NFL merger, the AFC West.

The Chiefs lead the series 77–56–2, including a 2–1 playoff record against Las Vegas.

=== Conference rivalries ===
==== Baltimore Ravens vs. New England Patriots ====
This rivalry stems from four playoff matches played between the two in the early to mid-2010s. They met in back-to-back AFC Championships (2011 and 2012) along with two other playoff matchups in 2009 and 2014; the teams have split the playoff matchups 2–2. However, the Patriots lead the all-time series 12–5.

==== Baltimore Ravens vs. Tennessee Titans ====
Despite starting in the late 1990s, the rivalry wouldn't gain intensity until the 2000s. The Ravens lead the all-time series 15–13. The Ravens lead the playoff series 3–2; the road team has won all five playoff matchups.

==== Buffalo Bills vs. Kansas City Chiefs ====
The series originated during the American Football League's inaugural season in 1960, as both the Kansas City Chiefs, then known as the Dallas Texans, and Buffalo Bills were charter teams in the league. Despite being in two different divisions since their founding in 1960, the Bills and Chiefs have had many notable moments in NFL postseason history, most notably the 1966 AFL Championship Game, the 2021 AFC Divisional playoff game (known especially for the infamous '13 Seconds'), and the 2023 AFC Divisional playoff game (known as 'Wide Right II'). Since 2020, the rivalry has redeveloped as both teams consistently contended for the AFC title. A rivalry has also developed between Bills quarterback Josh Allen and Chiefs quarterback Patrick Mahomes, with Mahomes leading the head-to-head matchup 5–4. Buffalo currently leads the series 31–26–1, but Kansas City leads the playoff series 5–2. Of the seven playoff meetings the teams have contested, four were AFL/AFC championship games.

==== Buffalo Bills vs. Tennessee Titans ====
Formerly divisional rivals in the AFL East, the Bills and Titans (formerly the Houston Oilers) faced off in several high-profile games in the 1980s and 1990s, including two of the most famous postseason games in NFL history, namely The Comeback and the Music City Miracle. Both of these games were franchise-altering, as The Comeback became one of the greatest moments in Bills history but was later cited as one of the reasons the Oilers moved to Tennessee, while the Music City Miracle cemented the Titans' home in Nashville but became the start of a 17-year playoff drought for the Bills. The series remains somewhat heated to this day, as several games since 1999 have been decided by a touchdown or less. The Titans currently lead the all-time series 30–21, but the Bills are 2–1 in the postseason.

==== Denver Broncos vs. New England Patriots ====
The Broncos and Patriots rivalry first began in the AFL, where the teams met frequently and played in the league's inaugural game in 1960. The rivalry later gained national prominence during the Tom Brady–Peyton Manning era, highlighted by several high-stakes postseason games. The teams have met six times in the playoffs, including AFC Championship Games in 2013, 2015, and 2025; Denver won the first two, while New England won the most recent one. Denver currently leads the all-time series 31–25, including a 4–2 record in the playoffs.

==== Denver Broncos vs. Pittsburgh Steelers ====
The Broncos lead the Steelers 20–14–1 and have a 5–3 playoff record. Of their eight playoff matchups, six of them eventually saw the winner play in the Super Bowl. Two of the games featured playoff upsets by the Steelers winning in 1984 and 2005.

==== Indianapolis Colts vs. New England Patriots ====
The Colts–Patriots rivalry is one of the NFL's most famous. The two teams combined for eight Super Bowl victories (six by the Patriots and two for the Colts) and thirteen AFC Championships since 1970, while both are noted for their organizational excellence. Despite starting in the 1970s, it would gain much more attention during the 2000s since that was the peak of the Brady-Manning rivalry. The Patriots currently lead 53–32, including a 4–1 playoff record.

==== New England Patriots vs. Pittsburgh Steelers ====
Both teams are currently tied with six Super Bowl championships and have enjoyed a competitive rivalry during the 1990s and into the 2000s and 2010s. The two teams met thrice in the AFC championship in 2001, 2004 and 2016, all of which was won by the Patriots en route to winning the Super Bowl each year. Meanwhile, the Steelers won Super Bowls XL and XLIII but did not face the Patriots in either postseason run. CBS Sports ranked this rivalry in the 8th spot of the NFL rivalries of the 2000s.

The Patriots currently lead the head-to-head series 20–17, including a 4–1 record in the playoffs.

== National Football Conference ==
=== NFC East ===
==== Washington Commanders vs. Dallas Cowboys ====
The rivalry between the Dallas Cowboys and Washington Commanders, formerly known as the Redskins, is called one of the top NFL rivalries of all time and "one of the greatest in sports" by Sports Illustrated. The two franchises have won 37 combined division titles and ten NFL Championships, including eight combined Super Bowls.

The rivalry started in 1960 when the Cowboys joined the league as an expansion team. During that year they were in separate conferences, but played once during the season. Since 1961, Dallas has been in the same division as Washington. Dallas leads the all-time series 82–49–2. Despite their storied history they've only met twice in the playoffs (1972 and 1982), both times in the NFC Championship Game. Washington won both of those meetings.

In 2009, they were the two wealthiest franchises in the NFL.

==== Washington Commanders vs. Philadelphia Eagles ====
Washington leads the all-time series 92–89–6, but the teams have split their two playoff meetings. The then-Washington Redskins won their first playoff matchup in the 1990 Wild Card round 20–6. The Eagles won the second playoff matchup in the 2024 NFC Championship Game 55–23.

==== Washington Commanders vs. New York Giants ====
The Giants and Washington Commanders, formerly known as the Redskins, have a storied rivalry, as well as the oldest in the NFC East, dating back to 1932 with the founding of the Redskins' predecessors, the Boston Braves. While New York leads the rivalry, there have been great periods of competition between the two teams. On November 27, 1966, the Redskins defeated the Giants in what is the highest-scoring game in NFL history, 72–41. The teams' most notable meetings were during the 1980s where they clashed for division and conference titles to reach the Super Bowl. Between 1982–91 they combined for 8 division titles and 5 Super Bowl titles, two by the Giants (1986, 1990) and three by the Redskins (1982, 1987, 1991). New York has a 108–76–6 record over Washington. The Giants are the second team to mark 100 wins against another NFL franchise in 2017. (The Green Bay Packers were the first team to do so against the Lions in 2016.) New York's win total over Washington is also currently the most in the NFL. The teams have met in the playoffs twice, with the Redskins shutting out the Giants 28–0 in 1943 and New York returning the favor 43 years later in the 1986 NFC Conference Championship, winning 17–0.

==== Dallas Cowboys vs. Philadelphia Eagles ====
The rivalry between the Dallas Cowboys and Philadelphia Eagles has been one of the higher-profile rivalries in the NFL over the past three decades, characterized by bitterly contested games that are typical of the NFC East, with both teams often contesting for the division crown. The Cowboys have a 76–59 edge in the all-time series. Since 2006, the rivalry was a frequent matchup on NBC Sunday Night Football over 16 matchups as the teams are tied 8–8 going head to head, including the playoffs. The teams met four times, with the home team winning all four games and Dallas holding a 3–1 edge. The Eagles won in 1980, while the Cowboys won in 1992, 1995, and 2009.

==== Dallas Cowboys vs. New York Giants ====
The modern rivalry dates back to the 2003 season when Bill Parcells took over as Cowboys head coach. After he left, Wade Phillips coached the Cowboys to a division-winning season in 2007 only to see the team fall to the eventual Super Bowl XLII champion Giants in the 2007 Divisional playoff game, in what proved to be the final playoff game in Texas Stadium history. Both teams combine for a total of nine Super Bowl Championships with the Giants winning the two most recent trophies. Dallas is ahead in the all-time series 78–48–2. The aforementioned 2007 playoff meeting was their only postseason encounter.

==== Philadelphia Eagles vs. New York Giants ====
The rivalry between the Philadelphia Eagles and New York Giants dates back to 1933. However, the competition began to heat up when both teams came to relative prominence in the 1940s and 1950s. The rivalry is mainly based on the two teams being in the same division in the NFL since 1933 and the geographic New York City–Philadelphia rivalry. It is ranked by Sports Illustrated as amongst the top ten NFL rivalries of all-time at #4. However, the geographic rivalry between the Eagles and Giants is well known in football circles, meriting mention on ESPN.com.

The rivalry is the second-oldest of the NFC East. It has been called the greatest rivalry in NFL history other than Steelers vs Ravens. The Giants and Eagles have met five times in the playoffs, with the Eagles leading 3–2. The Giants won in 1981 and 2000, and the Eagles won in 2006, 2008, and 2022. The Eagles currently lead the all-time series 97–91–2.

=== NFC North ===
==== Chicago Bears vs. Detroit Lions ====
The Bears–Lions rivalry is an NFL rivalry between the Chicago Bears and Detroit Lions. Chicago and Detroit share or have shared a sports rivalry in all four major sports (see; Bulls–Pistons rivalry, Tigers–White Sox rivalry, and Blackhawks–Red Wings rivalry). The franchises first met in 1930 when the Lions were known as the Portsmouth Spartans and based in Portsmouth, Ohio. They moved to Detroit for the 1934 season. The Bears and Lions have been division rivals since 1933 and have usually met twice a season since the Lions franchise began. The Bears lead the series 105–82–5.

This rivalry is also the longest-running annual series in the NFL as both teams have met at least once a season since 1930. (As mentioned above, due to the 1982 strike, both games scheduled for the Bears–Packers rivalry were not played that season.) However, one of the two meetings between both teams was canceled during Week 3 of the 1987 season, which does not make this rivalry the longest-running continuous series in the NFL (that feat belongs to the Lions–Packers rivalry, who have met at least twice a season since 1932 without any canceled meetings).

==== Chicago Bears vs. Green Bay Packers ====
The Bears–Packers rivalry began in 1921 and is the league's longest. The Packers lead the series 110–98–6, the fourth time in NFL history that a team has recorded 100 wins against an opponent, following the Lions–Packers, Giants–Commanders, and Bears–Lions rivalries.

The two clubs have won a combined 22 NFL championships (including 5 Super Bowls) and have 48 members in the Pro Football Hall of Fame.

The strike-shortened 1982 NFL season wiped out both Bears–Packers meetings scheduled for that season. Because of this, it is not the longest continuous rivalry. That goes to the Lions–Packers rivalry, which has been played at least twice each season since 1932.

The rivalry has led to the Chicago–Milwaukee/Wisconsin rivalry being seen in other sports, like the Brewers–Cubs rivalry in Major League Baseball and the rivalry between the Bulls and Bucks in the National Basketball Association.

The teams met four times in the 2011 calendar year, and the Packers won all four. They met on January 2 in the 2010 regular-season finale, then three weeks later in the NFC Conference Championship Game en route to winning Super Bowl XLV, and then they had both meetings in the 2011 regular season. The 2013 regular season finale served as a playoff game for the NFC North Division Championship, which Green Bay won 33–28, scoring a 48-yard touchdown on fourth-and-8 with 38 seconds left.

The Packers and Bears are currently one–two in all-time NFL franchise wins.

==== Chicago Bears vs. Minnesota Vikings ====
It began when the Vikings entered the league as an expansion team in 1961. The first time these two teams met, the Vikings stunned the Bears 37–13 in Minnesota. Both teams are members of the NFC North and play at least twice a year. The rivalry is known for having had many offensive-oriented contests, and also several surprising results. The Vikings lead the overall series 70–59–2. The teams have met once in the postseason, a 35–18 Bears win in the 1994 Wild Card Round.

==== Detroit Lions vs. Green Bay Packers ====
The Lions–Packers rivalry is an NFL rivalry between the Detroit Lions and Green Bay Packers. They first met in 1930 when the Lions were known as the Portsmouth Spartans and based in Portsmouth, Ohio. The team eventually moved to Detroit for the 1934 season. The Lions and Packers have been division rivals since 1933 and have always met at least twice a season since 1932, without any canceled games between both rivals. The Packers lead the series 108–79–7. This is the first time in NFL history that a team has recorded 100 wins over an opponent. The Packers have won both playoff meetings.

==== Detroit Lions vs. Minnesota Vikings ====
The Lions and Vikings have played twice annually since the Vikings entered the league's Western Conference in 1961. The two teams moved to the NFC Central after the AFL-NFL merger in 1970, which became the NFC North after the NFL's 2002 realignment. This is the only NFC North rivalry without any head-to-head postseason meetings. The Vikings lead the all-time series 82–46–2.

==== Green Bay Packers vs. Minnesota Vikings ====
The Packers–Vikings rivalry began in 1961 when the Vikings entered the league as an expansion team. The rivalry is known for being very close, both in the all-time series and in each game. It is also considered to be one of the most intense rivalries in the NFL, due to these close games, the fact that both teams have often fought for the NFC North title and the fact that the two states in which these teams reside (Minnesota and Wisconsin) have a rivalry in many sports, seen between the Big Ten rivals, the University of Wisconsin and University of Minnesota. Events such as Randy Moss mooning the Green Bay crowd in the first playoff game between these two teams (won by the Vikings), and former Packer great Brett Favre's move to the Vikings have created more resentment between these teams. The Packers lead the all-time series 67–63–3. The teams have split their two playoff contests.

=== NFC South ===
==== Tampa Bay Buccaneers vs. Atlanta Falcons ====
The Buccaneers and Falcons met for the first time in the 1977 season, one year after the Buccaneers joined the NFL as the newest expansion team. The rivalry became fiercer after the 2002 season, when the Buccaneers and Falcons were placed in the same division, leading to constant clashes for the divisional title. The overall series is tied 33–33. The two teams have not met in the playoffs.

==== Tampa Bay Buccaneers vs. Carolina Panthers ====
Although the Panthers and the Buccaneers have played since 1995, this match-up became a full-fledged rivalry in 2002 when they moved into the same division, the NFC South. This first meeting came in 1995 at Memorial Stadium in Clemson when the Bucs won 20–13. The rivalry only got more intense in the early to mid-2000s as both teams fought for dominance. The series is tied 26–26.

==== Tampa Bay Buccaneers vs. New Orleans Saints ====
Although the Saints and the Buccaneers have played since 1977, this matchup began a full-fledged rivalry in 2002 when the Saints and the Buccaneers moved into the same division, the NFC South. The first matchup was in 1977 at the Louisiana Superdome (now the Caesars Superdome) when the Buccaneers won 33–14, their first win in franchise history. The Saints are leading this rivalry 41–28, while the Buccaneers won their only playoff meeting 30–20 on January 17, 2021.

==== Atlanta Falcons vs. Carolina Panthers ====
The Panthers and Falcons have played each other twice a year since 1995, as members of both the NFC West (1995–2001) and NFC South (2002–present) divisions. The Panthers inaugural game as an NFL franchise came against the Falcons. Both franchises have a combined thirteen divisional titles (twelve as members of the same division) and four Super Bowl appearances, with the Falcons appearing in Super Bowl XXXIII and Super Bowl LI and the Panthers appearing in Super Bowls XXXVIII and 50.

Their games have been marked by intensity, close scores, and remarkable performances. One of the famous events occurred in 2015 when the Falcons spoiled the Panthers' quest for a perfect season.

It is also known as the "I-85 Rivalry" due to Atlanta and Charlotte being only four hours apart on Interstate 85. Indeed, games between the two often feature large contingents of the away team's fans visiting the stadium.

Atlanta leads the rivalry 37–26.

==== Atlanta Falcons vs. New Orleans Saints ====
At over 100 games played, the series between the Falcons and Saints in the NFC South is the oldest and most established rivalry in the division. Born one year apart, the Saints and Falcons were the first two NFL franchises in the Deep South (Dallas being arguably southern but not in the traditional Deep South). They have shared many of the same players, such as Morten Andersen (the leading scorer in Saints History, as Falcons Kicker Matt Bryant is now the leading scorer in Falcons history), Bobby Hebert (who quarterbacked for both teams in the 1990s), and Joe Horn (the Pro Bowl Saints receiver who left for the Falcons in 2007). They have also drawn coaches from the same families and even shared a head coach: recent Falcons coach Jim L. Mora is the son of longtime Saints coach Jim E. Mora, and former Falcons and Saints coach Wade Phillips is the son of former Saints coach Bum Phillips. Although rarely noted by the national media—no doubt due to both teams' long stretches of futility until the opening decade of the 21st century—games between the Falcons and Saints have riveted their respective regions for more than 40 years. Fans of both teams consider the other their most important and hated opponent.

ESPN.com writer Len Pasquarelli has cited the rivalry as one of the best in all of sports: "Every year, bus caravans loaded with rowdy (and usually very inebriated) fans make the seven-hour trip between the two cities. Unless you've attended a Falcons-Saints debauchery-filled afternoon, you'll just have to take my word for how much fun it really can be."

The Falcons lead the overall series 59–56. Falcons won the only playoff matchup in the 1991 NFC Wild Card. From 2006 onward, the teams have become consistent playoff threats, New Orleans appropriated five division titles in 2006, 2009, 2011, 2017, and 2018 and also made the playoffs as a wild card team in 2010 and 2013 while the Falcons made the playoffs in 2008 and captured the division in 2010, 2012 and 2016. Both teams have reached the Super Bowl, only once in New Orleans and twice in Atlanta (the Saints won Super Bowl XLIV over the Indianapolis Colts 31–17, while Atlanta lost Super Bowl XXXIII to the Denver Broncos 34–19 and Super Bowl LI to the New England Patriots 34–28 in overtime).

==== Carolina Panthers vs. New Orleans Saints ====
The Panthers and Saints have played each other twice a year since 1995, as members of both the NFC West (1995–2001) and NFC South (2002–present) divisions. The Saints lead the all-time series, 34–30, which includes their playoff win over the Panthers in the 2017 NFC Wild Card round.

=== NFC West ===
==== San Francisco 49ers vs. Arizona Cardinals ====
San Francisco leads the series 39–31. Though they first met in 1951 and would meet occasionally until 2000, this would not become a full-fledged rivalry until both teams were placed in the NFC West division in 2002. While a close rivalry, it is often lopsided on both ends. After the 49ers won nine meetings between 2009 and 2013, the Cardinals won eight straight meetings between 2014 and 2018.

The two teams have yet to meet in the playoffs.

==== San Francisco 49ers vs. Los Angeles Rams ====
San Francisco leads 80–72–3. After the Rams relocated to St. Louis (in 1995), the rivalry had temporarily lost its geographical lore, although games still showed signs of intensity. The cultural differences between the West Coast (where the 49ers are based) and the Midwest (where the Rams were based) also briefly added to the intensity of the rivalry. In 2016, the Rams moved back to Los Angeles making the rivalry once again a battle between Southern and Northern California. For some time prior; both teams had been far less competitive within the rivalry as the Rams had failed to qualify for the postseason from 2005-16 while the 49ers had struggled to remain consistent despite two Super Bowl appearances in 2013 and 2019. Both teams would return to relevance under head coaches Kyle Shanahan and Sean McVay respectively. The two sides also rekindled the rivalry with the addition of receiver Deebo Samuel gaining notoriety of taunting against the Rams and his publicized feuding with Rams’ defensive tackle Aaron Donald, as they were unable to beat the 49ers in 6 straight regular season matchups until 2022. The two teams met in the NFC Championship that year in a hard-fought battle with the 49ers taking the lead heading into the 4th quarter. However; inconsistent play on defense, and multiple penalties on both sides slowly chipped away the lead as the Rams inched ahead with 4 minutes left in the game. San Francisco quarterback Jimmy Garoppolo would throw a game-sealing interception while evading a sack from Aaron Donald, thus giving the Rams the victory and triumphantly ending the 49ers’ 6-game win streak as the Rams would eventually go on to win Super Bowl LVI. Sports Illustrated considers it the 8th best rivalry of all time in the NFL.

==== San Francisco 49ers vs. Seattle Seahawks ====
The Seattle Seahawks and San Francisco 49ers became divisional rivals in 2002, when Seattle moved to the NFC West. However, it was not until 2011 that the match-up became a true rivalry. The 49ers won the division in 2002 but did not have another winning season until 2011. Meanwhile, the Seahawks made the playoffs five straight times from 2003–2007 and appeared in Super Bowl XL.

In 2010, the Seahawks hired former USC head coach Pete Carroll, who took the Seahawks to the playoffs in his first year, and the rivalry started growing in 2011 when the 49ers hired former Stanford head coach Jim Harbaugh, who also took his team to the playoffs in his first year. Carroll and Harbaugh had been intense rivals as college head coaches, and the rivalry followed them into the NFL.

The rivalry took off in 2012 when the two teams posted winning records and made the NFC playoffs during the same year for the first time. The teams split their games, with the Seahawks defeating the 49ers 42–13 on national television in a week 16 game that kept the division race alive until the final week. San Francisco ultimately won the division by a half-game and advanced to Super Bowl XLVII (losing 34–31 to the Baltimore Ravens), while the Seahawks lost in the NFC divisional round.

In 2013, the teams again split their games, and the Seahawks won the division by a game and went on to win Super Bowl XLVIII, defeating the 49ers in the NFC Championship game. All three 49ers-Seahawks games were highly anticipated that season, and most sports analysts called it the best rivalry in the NFL. Ever since then the San Francisco 49ers and the Seattle Seahawks fans are always eagerly awaiting this divisional round matchup.

After several years of mediocre or poor teams, the 49ers regained relevance in the 2019 season. They were the last undefeated team in the league at 8–0. On Monday Night Football, they played a pitched battle where San Francisco missed what would have been a game-winning field goal in overtime. They proceeded to lose their first game of the season when Seattle kicked a field goal on the last play of the game. The rematch between the division foes was the final game of the NFL season, with the division championship (and playoff seeding) on the line. The 49ers won this time, earning the top seed in the NFC.

Seattle leads the series 33–25. The teams have met three times in the playoffs, with the home team winning all three games and Seattle holding a 2–1 edge.

==== Arizona Cardinals vs. Los Angeles Rams ====
A resurgent rivalry in the NFL, also one of the oldest matchups in the NFL as both teams first met during the 1937 NFL Season whilst the Rams were located in Cleveland, and the Cardinals in Chicago. The Rivalry briefly resurged in the early 2020s as both the Cardinals' and Rams returned to postseason contention. The two would frequently clash in notable matchups during the season as the Rams experienced their own rebuild following their relocation back to Los Angeles in 2017. Historically; Arizona fans have often harbored animosity towards Los Angeles-based teams, similarly to the Diamondbacks–Dodgers rivalry in Major League Baseball. Los Angeles has proven to be significantly more dominant by winning 9 out of 10 games since the hiring of head coach Sean McVay. During the 2021 season, the Cardinals not only managed to end their 8-game losing streak against the Rams but also stole the lead of the NFC following a shocking week 5 victory. The two teams would meet again in a Monday Night matchup culminating in the Rams winning the game and extracting vengeance. Later that season; the Cardinals would stumbled to barely secure a Wild Card berth while the Rams managed to win the division, setting a date for both teams to meet in the NFC Wild Card at SoFi Stadium; the Rams' first home playoff game in their new stadium. During the third quarter, Rams' running back Cam Akers would collide violently with Cardinals' safety Budda Baker, sending Baker to the hospital. Initially following the collision, Akers taunted Baker as he lay on the ground unconscious; unaware he had suffered a severe concussion. Akers would later realize the severity of Baker's injuries and issued a public apology and support for Baker's recovery. Despite Kyler Murray's best efforts, he would be intercepted twice and one would be returned for a pick 6 as he attempted to evade a sack from Rams' linebacker Troy Reeder. Eventually, the Cardinals would suffer a brutal 34–11 loss at the hands of the Rams, the second postseason matchup between the two teams since the Rams would beat the St. Louis Cardinals in the 1975 NFC Divisional Game.

The Rams lead the all-time series 54–42–2, also winning both postseason matchups in 1975 and 2021.

==== Arizona Cardinals vs. Seattle Seahawks ====
One of the newer rivalries in the NFL, the Cardinals and Seahawks became divisional rivals after both were relocated to the NFC West due to the league's realignment in 2002. This rivalry has become one of the NFL's more bitter in recent years, as the mid-to-late 2010s often saw the Seahawks and Cardinals squaring off for NFC West supremacy. Many Cardinals fans view the Rams or the Seahawks as their arch-rival due to their 2010s dominance under quarterback Russell Wilson and head coach Pete Carroll, although Seattle shares more intense rivalries with the San Francisco 49ers and the Los Angeles Rams. Seattle leads the series 33–22–1. The two teams have not met in the playoffs.

==== Los Angeles Rams vs. Seattle Seahawks ====
The rivalry between the Los Angeles Rams and Seattle Seahawks came into existence in 2002 following the Seahawks’ relocation to the NFC West. The first postseason matchup between the two clubs occurred in the 2004 NFC Wild Card round when the Rams managed to defeat the Seahawks in Seattle 27–20. Much of the intensity waned during the decade as the Rams declined in competition throughout the 2000s and early 2010s, but several notable matchups between the two clubs still occurred. The rivalry has recently grown in animosity with multiple hostile moments of taunting or fights occurring in addition to 2 postseason matchups. The competition between both teams had begun to regrow significantly near the end of the 2010s while Seattle's iconic Legion of Boom teams had waned in competition and the Rams would begin to experience postseason success under head coach Sean McVay; who currently boasts a 10−5 record against the Seahawks since 2017. Multiple examples of violence between the two have occurred. For instance; during their first meeting of the 2018 season, the two teams met in Seattle during week 5 as tensions began to escalate after a scuffle between both benches after Rams wide receiver Brandin Cooks suffered a game-ending injury resulting from a controversial head-on collision from Seahawks safety Tedric Thompson, culminating in both benches clearing in a minor brawl. The rivalry reached a boiling point in hostility in 2020 following a gesture from Seahawks' Safety Jamal Adams lighting a cigar and taunting the Rams in a postgame press conference after the Seahawks had narrowly beaten out the Rams for the divisional title during a game in Seattle. The Rams would go on to face Seattle in the wild-card round of the postseason in a 30−20 battle that saw the Seahawks turn the ball over 3 times as the Rams came out on top, ending Seattle's 10 game home postseason win streak (ironically started in 2004 after losing to the Rams in the 2004 Wild Card game). Following the game, Rams' cornerback Jalen Ramsey voiced his own retaliatory remarks aimed at the Seahawks, proclaiming: They outta take their hats and t-shirts down to Cabo this offseason! We sent their asses home!.

Seahawks lead the all-time series 30–28, but the Rams are 2−1 against the Seahawks in the playoffs.

=== Conference rivalries ===
==== Chicago Bears vs. New York Giants ====
The Bears and Giants have engaged in a long-standing rivalry that involved six NFL championship games. In the pre-Super Bowl era, the Bears won four of six championship games against the Giants, with one of the Giants' two victories involving the iconic "Sneakers Game" in the 1934 NFL Championship Game. The two teams also met in the playoffs twice in the Super Bowl era, splitting both meetings, with the winner eventually claiming the Super Bowl. The Bears lead the all-time series 37–25–2 and have a 5–3 postseason record.

==== Dallas Cowboys vs. Green Bay Packers ====
The rivalry between the Cowboys and the Packers has resulted in several notable games, including the "Ice Bowl" and other games impacting the playoff race. It most notably heated up during the late 2000s and 2010s, with several of their games impacting the NFC playoff race during that decade. During the Brett Favre era in Green Bay, the Cowboys dominated the rivalry, going 9–2 (including 9–0 in Dallas) against the Packers when Favre was the quarterback. When Aaron Rodgers became the Packers' starter in 2008, they dominated the rivalry, as Rodgers had an 8–2 record against the Cowboys, including a perfect 3–0 record in Dallas. The Packers lead the all-time series 23–17–1 and lead 5–4 in the playoffs.

==== Dallas Cowboys vs. Los Angeles Rams ====
The rivalry between the Dallas Cowboys and the Los Angeles Rams became prominent during the 1970s and 1980s. The Cowboys met the Rams eight times during that span and split those meetings. Two of those matchups decided the NFC's representative in the Super Bowl, with the Cowboys prevailing on both occasions. The two teams met again in the postseason during the 2018 NFC Divisional Round culminating in a Rams victory. The Cowboys lead the all-time series 20–18, but the Rams lead 5–4 in the playoffs.

==== Dallas Cowboys vs. San Francisco 49ers ====
The bitter rivalry between the Dallas Cowboys and San Francisco 49ers began in the 1970s and became prominent during the 1990s. For three straight seasons from 1992 through 1994 the two teams met in the conference championship game. Each was a hotly contested battle whose winner went on to win the Super Bowl in every one of those seasons. The NFL Top 10 ranked this rivalry to be the tenth best in the history of the NFL. San Francisco has played Dallas in nine postseason games with the Cowboys leading the postseason series 5–4. The 49ers lead the all-time series, 22–19–1.

==== Green Bay Packers vs. San Francisco 49ers ====
The rivalry between the Packers and the 49ers heated up during the 1990s, with the two teams facing each other in four consecutive playoff games. The Packers won four of five playoff games against the 49ers with Brett Favre as its quarterback, with four of those games pitting Favre against the 49ers' Hall of Fame quarterback Steve Young. With Aaron Rodgers as its quarterback, the 49ers won all four playoffs meetings.

The Packers currently lead the series 39–34–1, but the 49ers have won the last five postseason meetings to take a 6–4 lead.

==== Green Bay Packers vs. Seattle Seahawks ====
The Packers lead the series 16–9 overall and lead 3–1 in the playoffs.

==== Green Bay Packers vs. Tampa Bay Buccaneers ====
The Packers and Buccaneers were division rivals from 1977 to 2001 when both were in the NFC Central division. The teams have played several notable games, including a Snow Bowl game in 1985, a 1997 divisional playoff game and the 2020 NFC championship game. The Packers lead the series 35–23–1.

==== Los Angeles Rams vs. New Orleans Saints ====
The rivalry between the Los Angeles Rams and New Orleans Saints was once a fierce divisional battle as both teams played in the NFC West until the league's realignment in 2002 (Note: The Rams at the time of division realignment had been based in St Louis since 1995. The team relocated back to Los Angeles starting in the 2016 season where they had previously been based from 1946 to 1994). Animosity resurged between the two teams during the 2010s after the Rams had lured Saints' controversial defensive coordinator Gregg Williams in 2012, shortly before Williams and Saints' head coach Sean Payton would be implicated in the infamous Bountygate Scandal. Both teams had thrown insults towards one another in the media, most notably during the controversial 2018 NFC Championship Game, in which a critical pass to Saints' receiver Tommylee Lewis was illegally broken up by Rams' cornerback Nickell Robey-Coleman, though no flag was thrown, enraging the Saints for the blown call. Saints' receiver Michael Thomas expressed his anger towards the Rams and in regards to the no-call to the media following the game. The teams are tied 1–1 in the postseason, but the Rams lead the all-time series 46–35.

==== Los Angeles Rams vs. Minnesota Vikings ====
When the Vikings joined the NFL as an expansion franchise in 1961, they were placed in the Western Conference, which the Rams were a member of. The teams met twice a year until 1967 when the Vikings were moved to the Central Division.

The rivalry heated up during the 1970s, with four playoff meetings in a five-year span. The Vikings lead the all-time series 27–20–1 and are 5–3 in the playoffs.

==== New Orleans Saints vs. Minnesota Vikings ====
The Vikings lead the series 26–13 and lead 4–1 in the playoffs.

== Interconference rivalries ==
=== New England Patriots vs. New York Giants ===
Best known for their two classic meetings in Super Bowls XLII and XLVI, the Giants and Patriots have met 15 times, with the Patriots leading 8–7. However, the Giants own a 2–0 playoff record by winning both Super Bowl matchups.

=== Pittsburgh Steelers vs. Dallas Cowboys ===
One of the more famous rivalries in American Football. The Cowboys lead the all-time series 18–16, but the Steelers are 2–1 against the Cowboys in the Super Bowl, with the Steelers winning Super Bowls X and XIII, and most recently, the Cowboys winning Super Bowl XXX in their last Super Bowl appearance to date.

== Historic rivalries ==
=== AFC ===
==== Miami Dolphins vs. Las Vegas Raiders ====
One of the NFL's most prominent rivalries in the 1970s, the Dolphins and Raiders met three times in the playoffs in five years. The Raiders won two of the three meetings, the last of which became known as The Sea of Hands game which ended Miami's two-year reign as Super Bowl champions. The Raiders were also the Dolphins' first-ever opponent in their 1966 expansion season and also ended the team's 18-game winning streak following the Dolphins' unbeaten 1972 season.

The Raiders lead the all-time series 22–21–1, and lead 3–1 in the playoffs.

==== Pittsburgh Steelers vs. Tennessee Titans ====
A rivalry originally stemmed from the days in which the Steelers and the then-Houston Oilers were fierce divisional opponents in the former AFC Central. The Oilers controversially lost the 1979 AFC championship game to Pittsburgh as a result of a bad call toward receiver Mike Renfro’s infamous missed touchdown that was ruled out of bounds.

The Steelers lead the all-time series 49–32, including a 3–1 record over the Titans in the playoffs.

==== Las Vegas Raiders vs. Pittsburgh Steelers ====
The Immaculate Reception spawned a heated rivalry between the Raiders and Steelers, a rivalry that was at its peak during the 1970s when both teams were among the best in the league and both were known for their hard-hitting, physical play. The teams met in the playoffs in each of the next four seasons, starting with the Raiders' 33–14 victory in the 1973 divisional playoffs. Pittsburgh used the AFC championship game victories over Oakland (24–13 at Oakland in 1974 and 16–10 at Pittsburgh in 1975) as a springboard to victories in Super Bowl IX and Super Bowl X, before the Raiders notched a 24–7 victory at home in 1976 on their way to winning Super Bowl XI. To date, the two last met in the playoffs in 1983 when the eventual Super Bowl champion Raiders, playing in Los Angeles at the time, crushed the Steelers 38–10. The rivalry has somewhat died off in the years since, mainly due to the Raiders' on-field struggles since appearing in Super Bowl XXXVII. The Raiders lead the all-time series 17–16. The series is tied 3–3 in the playoffs.

==== Denver Broncos vs. Seattle Seahawks ====
The rivalry between the Denver Broncos and the Seattle Seahawks dates back to 1977, when the two clubs were AFC West division rivals until the early 2000s when the Seahawks joined the NFC. The clubs have played each other in the NFL playoffs twice, most recently in Super Bowl XLVIII, in which the Seahawks defeated the Broncos 43–8.

The Broncos currently lead the overall series, 36–23.

==== Las Vegas/Oakland Raiders vs. Seattle Seahawks ====
The rivalry between the Las Vegas Raiders and the Seattle Seahawks dates back to 1977, when the two clubs were AFC West division rivals until the early 2000s when the Seahawks joined the NFC. The clubs have played each other in the NFL playoffs twice, most recently in the 1984 AFC Wild Card Game, in which the Seahawks defeated the reigning Super Bowl champion Raiders 13–7.

The Raiders currently lead the overall series, 30–27.

=== NFC ===
==== Arizona Cardinals vs. Chicago Bears ====
The Chicago Bears and the Arizona Cardinals are the only two teams that remain from the league's inception in 1920. At that time, the Bears were known as the Decatur Staleys and played in Decatur, Illinois, while the Cardinals were the Racine Cardinals and played at Normal Park on Racine Avenue in Chicago. After the Bears moved to Chicago in 1921, the matchup between the teams became known as "The Battle of Chicago", making it the first true rivalry in the league's history. The rivalry diminished after the Cardinals relocated to St. Louis in 1960, and later to Arizona in 1988.

The Bears currently lead the series, 60–29–6.

==== Dallas Cowboys vs. Minnesota Vikings ====
The rivalry between the Cowboys and the Vikings heated up during the 1970s, with several of their games impacting the NFC playoff race during that decade. The Cowboys lead the all-time series 19–16, including a 4–3 record against the Vikings in the playoffs.

==== New York Giants vs Green Bay Packers ====
The Giants–Packers rivalry is a National Football League (NFL) rivalry between the New York Giants and the Green Bay Packers. The two teams have played since 1970 in the National Football Conference, and they play each other in the regular season either every three years or depending on its NFC division placement, and in the postseason, The Packers lead the all-time series 35–28–2 and postseason series 5–3.

==== New York Giants vs. San Francisco 49ers ====
The Giants-49ers rivalry is rooted in the 1980s when both teams were on the rise and would combine to win six Super Bowls from 1981–90. During that stretch, there were five postseason meetings between the two teams. The 49ers lead the series 23–21, and the teams have split their eight postseason meetings.

The 49ers defeated the Giants in the first two meetings (the 1981 NFC divisional round 38–24 and again in the divisional round, this time in 1984, winning 21–10) en route to victories in Super Bowl XVI and Super Bowl XIX. The Giants would defeat the 49ers in the next three playoff meetings; in the 1985 Wild Card round the Giants defeated the defending Super Bowl XIX champions 17–3, then crushed the 49ers 49–3 in the divisional round of the 1986 playoffs en route to winning Super Bowl XXI, the first in the history of the Giants franchise. This game is memorable for nose tackle Jim Burt's hit on Joe Montana that knocked him out of the game in the second quarter; Montana's pass on this play was intercepted by Lawrence Taylor and Taylor ran in a 34-yard touchdown.

The two teams met again in the 1990 NFC Championship Game. In one of the most physical football games ever played, the Giants upset the 49ers 15–13, ending their hopes of winning three Super Bowls in a row while the Giants went on to win their second Super Bowl in franchise history in Super Bowl XXV. The 49ers got their revenge in the 1993 playoffs when they defeated the Giants in the divisional round 44–3 in the last game of Lawrence Taylor's and Phil Simms' careers. The rivalry intensified again in the 2002 playoffs when the two clubs met in the NFC Wild Card playoff round and the 49ers behind Jeff Garcia erased a 38–14 gap for a 39–38 49ers win, a game decided on a chaotic and controversial botched field goal attempt by the Giants.

The rivalry has cooled down from its peak in the 1980s, however, during the 2011 NFC Championship Game the two met at Candlestick Park. The Giants defeated the 49ers 20–17 in overtime to go to and eventually win Super Bowl XLVI.

=== Defunct ===
==== Missouri Governor's Cup: Kansas City Chiefs vs. St. Louis Cardinals/St. Louis Rams ====
When St. Louis, Missouri had NFL teams, namely the Cardinals and later the Rams, a cross-state rivalry existed with the Kansas City Chiefs, with a trophy being awarded to the winner of each game. The series ended following the Rams' relocation back to Los Angeles in 2016, though both teams would play each other during the 2018 season in a matchup setting the record for the third-highest scoring game of all time, hailed by many as one of the greatest in league history.

==== Battle of the Bay: San Francisco 49ers vs. Oakland Raiders ====
When the Raiders were located in Oakland, California, just across San Francisco Bay from the 49ers, this series was known as the "Battle of the Bay" until the Raiders moved to Las Vegas. Preseason games were often held annually until fan violence broke out in 2011. The 49ers led the all-time series 9–7.

== Instate rivalries ==
=== New York Giants vs. New York Jets ===
The Giants lead the all-time series 8–7.

=== Miami Dolphins vs. Tampa Bay Buccaneers ===
The Buccaneers lead the all-time regular-season series 7–6.

=== Texas Governor's Cup: Dallas Cowboys vs. Houston Texans/Houston Oilers; Dallas Texans vs Houston Oilers ===
The Cowboys lead the regular season series with the Texans 5–3 and won their regular season series with the Oilers 5–3. The Oilers won the regular season series with the Dallas Texans 4–3 but lost their one post-season matchup, the 1962 American Football League Championship Game.

=== Philadelphia Eagles vs. Pittsburgh Steelers ===
The Eagles lead the all-time series 50–29–3. The rivalry goes back to the formation of the Steelers in 1933, and was a key rivalry of the pre-merger NFL days. Since the 1970 merger of the NFL and AFL, the rivalry has weakened, but is still ongoing, especially with help from rivalries in other sports leagues between both cities.

=== The Battle of Los Angeles: Los Angeles Rams vs. Los Angeles Raiders/Chargers ===
Initially, the Los Angeles Rams and Raiders were considered to be competing in the Battle of Los Angeles during the Raiders’ tenure in Los Angeles from 1982–1994. However, the rivalry ended as the Rams moved to St. Louis and the Raiders returned to Oakland in the mid-1990s.

The Rams began the process of moving back to Los Angeles in a joint-stadium project in 2015 before officially returning in 2016. During the process, the Raiders simultaneously unsuccessfully attempted relocating back to Los Angeles in a failed joint stadium project with the then-San Diego Chargers (of whom had played their first year as a franchise in Los Angeles). The intercity rivalry was revived instead with the Los Angeles Chargers being the city’s AFC team following their relocation from San Diego in 2017. The Rams currently lead the series 8–6. As Los Angeles-based teams, the Rams have won two of the three meetings.

=== Beltway Bowl: Washington Commanders vs. Baltimore Ravens ===
Though the two teams only play each other every four years; the Commanders have taken part in a minor geographic rivalry with the Baltimore Ravens as both stadiums are approximately 40 miles apart. The Commanders particularly had long blocked the return of an NFL team to Baltimore since the Colts franchise relocated to Indianapolis in 1984. Former owner Jack Kent Cooke had been accused in multiple instances of orchestrating any means to prevent the city from receiving a new franchise until the Cleveland Browns relocated to Baltimore in 1996, prompting Cooke to put the Redskins' then-new stadium in Landover, Maryland. The two teams play each other annually during the preseason. The Ravens currently lead the all-time series 5–3.

== See also ==
- List of NCAA college football rivalry games
- Major League Baseball rivalries
- Major League Soccer rivalries
- NBA rivalries
- NHL rivalries
