= Snow Bowl (1985) =

Notable NFL game

| Tampa Bay Buccaneers (2–10) | Green Bay Packers (5–7) |
|---|---|
| 0 | 21 |
| Head coach: Leeman Bennett | Head coach: Forrest Gregg |
| | 1 | 2 | 3 | 4 | Total |
|---|---|---|---|---|---|
| TB | 0 | 0 | 0 | 0 | 0 |
| GB | 0 | 7 | 7 | 7 | 21 |
- Date: December 1, 1985
- Stadium: Lambeau Field; Green Bay, Wisconsin, U.S.
- Favorite: Packers by 6.5
- Attendance: 19,856

TV in the United States
- Network: CBS
- Announcers: Jim Hill and John Dockery

The Snow Bowl was a National Football League (NFL) game played on December 1, 1985, between the Tampa Bay Buccaneers and the Green Bay Packers. Contested at Lambeau Field in Green Bay, Wisconsin, United States, it is well known for its poor weather conditions, including heavy snow before and during the game. Only 19,856 fans were in attendance, with over 36,000 ticket holders absent, making it the least attended game in Lambeau Field history up to that point; about two-thirds of the stadium was empty. The entire storm dropped over 14 inches (36 cm) of snow, before, during and after the game.

The game itself saw the Packers dominate the Buccaneers for a 21–0 victory. Despite four turnovers, the Packers offense gained 512 total yards on 31 first downs, with the Buccaneers recording only 65 yards on five first downs. Packers' wide receiver James Lofton received passes totaling over 100 yards from quarterback Lynn Dickey by halftime. Packers defensive end Alphonso Carreker sacked Buccaneers quarterback Steve Young a then-team record four times.

== Background ==
During the 1985 NFL season, the Tampa Bay Buccaneers and Green Bay Packers were scheduled to play each other twice, continuing their rivalry that began when the Buccaneers entered the NFC Central Division (now called the NFC North) in 1977. Both games were scheduled late in the season, with the Packers hosting the Buccaneers in Week 13 (on December 1) and the Buccaneers hosting the Packers the last game of the year (Week 16 on December 22). The Buccaneers entered their Week 13 match-up with the Packers with a record of 2–10, having just beaten the Detroit Lions in overtime the previous week. The Buccaneers had won 2 of their previous three games after starting the year 0–9. The Packers came into Week 13 with a record of 5–7 after losing to the Los Angeles Rams by a score of 34–17. The Packers were favored to win by 6.5 points.

In the lead-up to the game, a strong blizzard hit Green Bay, Wisconsin, starting with just under 2 inches (5.1 cm) of snow falling on the Saturday before the game. Before the game began, an additional 9 inches (23 cm) of snow fell, with wind gusts bringing the wind-chill factor to below 0 °F (−18 °C). The entire storm dropped over 14 inches (36 cm) of snow. The temperature at the end of the game, without wind chill, was 25 °F (−4 °C). Early Sunday morning, the Packers' grounds crew began snow removal and field preparations. Lambeau Field's underground field heating system was utilized to help prevent the turf from freezing. When the tarp covering the field was being removed, wind gusts destroyed it.

The blizzard presented significant challenges for people planning to attend the game. Although the game was sold out, only 19,856 fans were able to attend the game, with over 36,000 ticket holders considered no-shows, making this the lowest attended Packers' home game at Lambeau Field to that point. The Buccaneers chose to wear their away game jerseys, which were predominantly white. With visibility between one-quarter and one-half mile, there was concern that the Buccaneers would be difficult to see on the field.

== Game summary ==
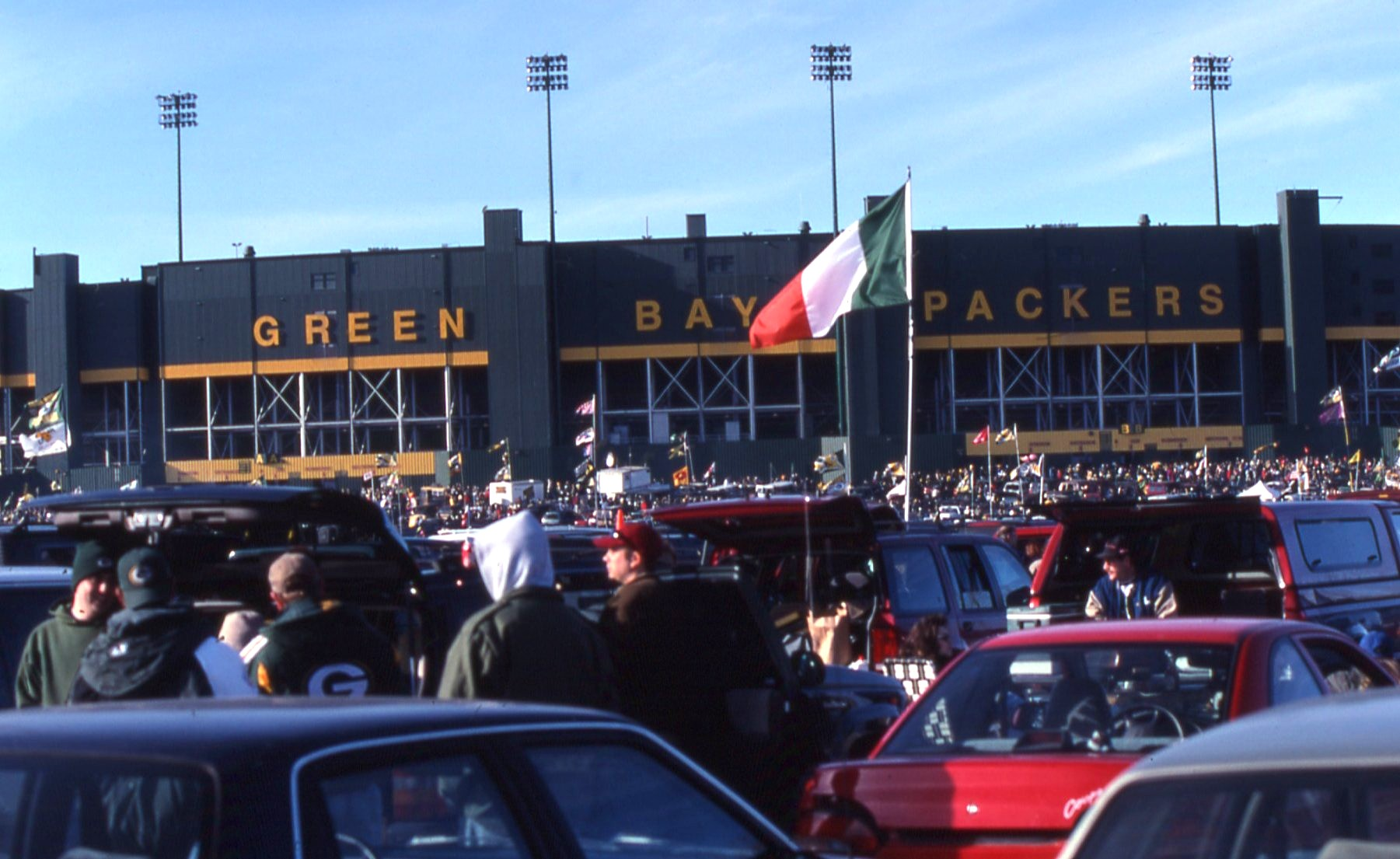
Lambeau Field (c. 1998) was the site of the Snow Bowl.

After a scoreless first quarter, the Packers scored the game's first points on an 11-play, 61-yard drive. Lynn Dickey was able to complete passes of 11 yards and 18 yards to James Lofton, as well as 19-yard completion to Paul Coffman. During the drive, the Packers punted the ball, but the Buccaneers were penalized for running into the punter, which allowed the drive to continue. Dickey scored on a 1-yard scramble into the end zone, with Al Del Greco kicking the extra point. In the third quarter, Gerry Ellis returned the opening kickoff after halftime for 40 yards. After another 19-yard completion to Coffman, Ellis rushed for a 35-yard touchdown. With another extra point by Del Greco, the 4-play, 55-yard drive put the Packers up 14–0. The Packers finished the scoring on a long drive in the fourth quarter. The Packers drove down 80 yards on 9 plays, culminating with a 3-yard rushing touchdown by Jessie Clark and another Del Greco extra point. Dickey completed passes of 19 yards and 18 yards on the drive, while Ivery had an 11-yard run and Ellis has a 15-yard run. The game ended with a score of 21–0, the first Packers' shutout since a 13–0 victory against the Buccaneers in 1977.

The Buccaneers were unable to move the ball on offense. Eight of their drives ended in punts and one ended in an interception, with the closest they came to scoring being a missed 35-yard field goal attempt in the fourth quarter. Steve Young was sacked by the Packers five times, with four of those coming from Alphonso Carreker, a Packers' record for a single game up to that point. Young only completed 8 passes all game, with two of those going to wide receivers (running back James Wilder had six receptions in addition to 12 rushes for 23 yards). Dickey threw for almost 300 yards, with 106 of those going to Lofton. Ivery and Ellis both rushed for over 100 yards, with the only offensive blemishes coming on two interceptions and two fumbles. The Packers only punted once during the game.

=== Box score ===
1985 Week 13: Tampa Bay Buccaneers at Green Bay Packers – Game summary

| Quarter | 1 | 2 | 3 | 4 | Total |
|---|---|---|---|---|---|
| Buccaneers | 0 | 0 | 0 | 0 | 0 |
| Packers | 0 | 7 | 7 | 7 | 21 |

at Lambeau Field, Green Bay, Wisconsin

- Date: Sunday, December 1, 1985
- Game time: 1:00 p.m. CST
- Game weather: 25 °F (−4 °C), snow and wind
- Game attendance: 19,856
- TV announcers (CBS): Jim Hill and John Dockery
- Sources: Pro-Football-Reference.com and Wisconsin State Journal

Game information
Scoring Summary

First quarter

- No scoring

Second quarter

- GB Lynn Dickey 1-yard run (Al Del Greco extra point), 6:16. Packers 7–0. Drive: 11 plays, 61 yards, 5:13.

Third Quarter

- GB Gerry Ellis 35-yard run (Del Greco extra point), 12:57. Packers 14–0. Drive: 4 plays, 55 yards, 2:03.

Fourth quarter

- GB Jessie Clark 3-yard run (Del Greco extra point), 9:52. Packers 21–0. Drive: 9 plays, 80 yards, 5:05.

Tampa Bay Buccaneers stats

Passing

- TB – Steve Young – 8/17, 53 yards, 1 interception

Rushing

- Steve Young – 7 carries, 31 yards
- James Wilder – 12 carries, 23 yards

Receiving

- James Wilder – 6 receptions, 33 yards
- Kevin House – 1 reception, 10 yards
- Calvin Magee – 1 reception, 10 yards
Green Bay Packers stats

Passing

- Lynn Dickey – 22/36, 299 yards, 2 interceptions

Rushing

- Eddie Lee Ivery – 13 carries, 109 yards
- Gerry Ellis – 9 carries, 101 yards, 1 touchdown
- Jessie Clark – 10 carries, 23 yards, 1 touchdown
- Lynn Dickey – 4 carries, -1 yards, 1 touchdown

Receiving

- James Lofton – 6 receptions, 106 yards
- Phil Epps – 4 receptions, 64 yards
- Paul Coffman – 5 receptions, 62 yards
- Jessie Clark – 3 receptions, 28 yards
- Eddie Lee Ivery – 2 receptions, 18 yards
- Ed West – 1 reception, 11 yards
- Preston Dennard – 1 reception, 10 yards

=== Analysis ===
Workers clearing the snow off of the field during the game; note the Buccaneers' white jerseys and the small crowd in the stands.

Numerous newspapers noted after the game that the Buccaneers appeared unprepared for the weather conditions, noting the differences in climate between Tampa, Florida, and Green Bay. The Packers were able to practice all week in the cold and were more accustomed to inclement weather. Buccaneers players and coaches noted the lack of a dome at Lambeau Field and noted their preference to play in a more temperate climate. Some complained that the NFL should not schedule late season games in Green Bay. Although originally thought to be a benefit, the Buccaneers' white jerseys ended up hurting them, with Buccaneer Scot Brantley recalling that Young could not see his receivers down the field. Young expressed frustration with the windy conditions, blaming it for his poor accuracy, while also noting the ball felt like ice. Buccaneers' receivers also stated that the snow caused them to have poor footing, making it more difficult to move quickly. Analysts noted that the Packers came out passing and pushed the ball down the field, almost unhampered by the weather.

Regarding playing conditions, the Packers were barely impacted by the snow and wind, as they were able to attain over 500 yards of offense, including 299 yards via the pass. Even with four turnovers (two interceptions and two fumbles), the Packers were still able to dominate the game, with both Ivery and Ellis rushing for over 100 yards and Lofton receiving for over 100 yards. The Packers' defense was even more dominant, holding the Buccaneers to just 65 yards of offense and 5 first downs, while also intercepting 1 pass and sacking Young 5 times.

== Outcome ==
The Packers would finish up the 1985 season with a record of 8–8, which included a 20–17 victory against the Buccaneers in Tampa. The Buccaneers would go on to lose the rest of their games that season, ending the year with a record of 2–14. Neither team made the playoffs.

=== Legacy ===
The game became known in Packers' history and the Buccaneers–Packers rivalry not necessarily for the play on the field, but rather for the weather and its impacts on game attendance and field conditions. Packers' personnel noted after the game that this was one of the worst storms they had witnessed in Green Bay and one of the most impactful to a Packers home game. The stadium was so empty that fans started sledding down the aisles. The gameday attendance was the lowest in Packers' history until the COVID-19 pandemic prevented all fans from attending games during parts of the 2020 NFL season. In 2014, Sports Illustrated called the game one of the top ten most memorable NFL games in the snow.
