= 1981 Minnesota Vikings season =

NFL team season; last one in Metropolitan Stadium

- General manager: Mike Lynn
- Head coach: Bud Grant
- Home stadium: Metropolitan Stadium

Results
- Record: 7–9
- Division place: 4th NFC Central
- Playoffs: Did not qualify
- Pro Bowlers: LB Matt Blair; WR Ahmad Rashad; TE Joe Senser

Uniform
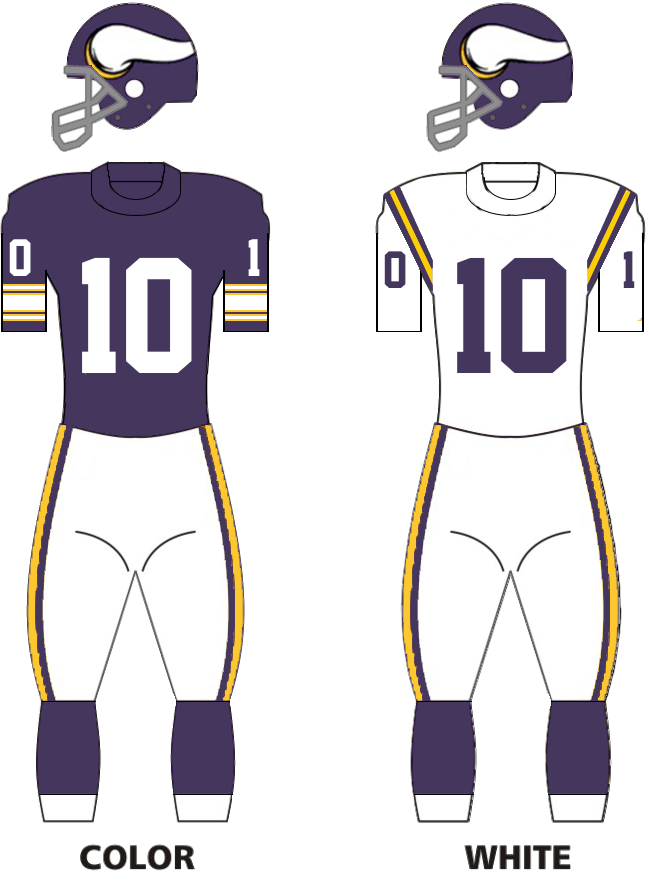

The 1981 season was the Minnesota Vikings' 21st in the National Football League, their 15th under head coach Bud Grant, and their final season at Metropolitan Stadium. They finished with a 7–9 record, and missed the playoffs for the second time in three seasons.

The Vikings attempted 709 passes in 1981 (44.3 per game), a league record that stood for 30 years until it was broken by the 2012 Detroit Lions.

This would be the final season that the Vikings played their home games outdoors until 2014.

== Offseason ==
=== 1981 draft ===
| Pro Bowler |

1981 Minnesota Vikings Draft
| Draft order | | Player name | Position | College | Notes |
| Round | Selection | Player name | Position | College | Notes |
|---|---|---|---|---|---|
| 1 | 18 | Traded to the Baltimore Colts (Note: The Vikings traded their first-round selection (18th overall) to the Colts in exchange for two second-round (39th and 52nd overall) and a fifth-round selections (123rd overall).) | | | |
| 2 | 39 | Mardye McDole | Wide receiver | Mississippi State | from Colts |
| 2 | 45 | Robin Sendlein | Linebacker | Texas | |
| 2 | 52 | Jarvis Redwine | Running back | Nebraska | from Rams via Redskins and Colts |
| 3 | 71 | Traded to the New Orleans Saints (Note: The Vikings traded their third- and fifth-round selections (71st and 128th overall) to the Saints in exchange for OT Steve Riley.) | | | |
| 3 | 74 | Tim Irwin | Offensive tackle | Tennessee | from Patriots (Note: The Vikings traded RB Chuck Foreman to the Patriots in exchange for the a third-round selection (74th overall).) |
| 4 | 101 | John Swain | Cornerback | Miami (FL) | |
| 5 | 123 | Wendell Ray | Defensive end | Missouri | from Colts |
| 5 | 128 | Traded to the New Orleans Saints | | | |
| 6 | 154 | Traded to the Miami Dolphins (Note: The Vikings traded their sixth-round selection (154th overall) and a 1982 fifth-round selection (120th overall) to the Dolphins in exchange for C Jim Langer.) | | | |
| 7 | 184 | Don Shaver | Running back | Kutztown | |
| 8 | 210 | Wade Wilson | Quarterback | East Texas State | |
| 9 | 237 | Traded to the Seattle Seahawks (Note: The Vikings traded their ninth-round selection (236th overall) to the Seahawks in exchange for OT Nick Bebout.) | | | |
| 10 | 266 | James Murphy | Wide receiver | Utah State | |
| 11 | 293 | Bill Stephanos | Offensive tackle | Boston College | |
| 12 | 320 | Brian Williams | Tight end | Southern | |

=== Undrafted free agents ===
1981 undrafted free agents of note
| Player | Position | College |
|---|---|---|
| Mitchell Berg | Safety | Saint John's (MN) |
| David Gutzke | Safety | Princeton |
| Ricky Robinson | Defensive tackle | Tennessee State |
| Freddie Smith | Running back | Auburn |

== Roster ==
1981 Minnesota Vikings roster
| Quarterbacks (QB): 9 Tommy Kramer; 11 Wade Wilson; Running backs (RB): 23 Ted Brown; 32 Tony Galbreath; 36 Sam Harrell; 31 Eddie Payton; 22 Jarvis Redwine; 34 Rickey Young; Wide receivers (WR): 80 Terry LeCount; 87 Leo Lewis; 28 Ahmad Rashad; 85 Sammy White; Tight ends (TE): 82 Bob Bruer; 81 Joe Senser | Offensive linemen (OL): 61 Wes Hamilton G; 51 Jim Hough G; 56 Dave Huffman G; 76 Tim Irwin T; 58 Jim Langer C; 78 Steve Riley T; 67 Dennis Swilley C; 73 Ron Yary T; Defensive linemen (DL): 73 Neil Elshire DE; 75 Randy Holloway DE; 79 Doug Martin DE; 77 Mark Mullaney DE; 89 Ken Sanders DE; 72 James White NT; 91 Ray Yakavonis NT | Linebackers (LB): 59 Matt Blair OLB; 52 Dennis Johnson ILB; 53 Henry Johnson ILB; 54 Fred McNeill OLB; 57 Robin Sendlein OLB; 50 Jeff Siemon ILB; 55 Scott Studwell ILB; Defensive backs (DB): 45 Tommy Hannon SS; 25 Kurt Knoff FS; 49 Keith Nord FS; 29 John Swain CB; 37 Willie Teal CB; 27 John Turner CB; 44 Walt Williams CB; Special teams (ST): 8 Greg Coleman P; 7 Rick Danmeier K | Reserve: 62 Brent Boyd G (IR); 12 Steve Dils QB (IR); 83 Ken MacAfee TE (IR); 88 Mardye McDole WR (IR); 74 Greg Murtha T (IR); 40 Doug Paschal RB (IR); 90 Wendell Ray DE (IR); 66 Bill Stephanos T (IR); Rookies in italics |

== Preseason ==
| Week | Date | Opponent | Result | Record | Venue | Attendance |
|---|---|---|---|---|---|---|
| 1 | August 8 | Miami Dolphins | L 6–20 | 0–1 | Metropolitan Stadium | 45,165 |
| 2 | August 14 | at Washington Redskins | L 13–27 | 0–2 | Robert F. Kennedy Memorial Stadium | 44,662 |
| 3 | August 22 | Atlanta Falcons | W 20–19 | 1–2 | Metropolitan Stadium | 42,908 |
| 4 | August 27 | at Los Angeles Rams | L 31–34 | 1–3 | Anaheim Stadium | 60,141 |

== Regular season ==
After opening the season with back-to-back losses, the Vikings ran off five straight wins and sat near the top of the NFC at midseason. After splitting their next four games, the Vikings were 7–4 and poised for a playoff run—however, they lost their last five games to close out the year.

The Vikings were led by quarterback Tommy Kramer, who enjoyed the most productive season of his career, throwing for 3,912 yards and 26 touchdowns. However, Kramer also threw 24 interceptions in 1981. The Vikings set an NFL record for pass attempts with 709.

A trio of offensive standouts paced the Vikings in 1981 at the skill positions. Running back Ted Brown was the team's main ball carrier, rushing for 1,063 yards, and also came in third in the NFL with 83 pass receptions; he scored eight touchdowns. Veteran wide receiver Sammy White also eclipsed the 1,000 yard mark for the first time in his career (1,001) and tight end Joe Senser, who would later become a color analyst on radio for the Vikings, logged 1,004 yards receiving with eight touchdowns; Senser went to the Pro Bowl for the 1981 season.

=== Schedule ===
| Week | Date | Opponent | Result | Record | Venue | Attendance |
|---|---|---|---|---|---|---|
| 1 | September 5 | at **Tampa Bay Buccaneers** | **L** 13–21 | 0–1 | Tampa Stadium | 66,287 |
| 2 | September 14 | Oakland Raiders | **L** 10–36 | 0–2 | Metropolitan Stadium | 47,186 |
| 3 | September 20 | **Detroit Lions** | **W** 26–24 | 1–2 | Metropolitan Stadium | 45,350 |
| 4 | September 27 | at **Green Bay Packers** | **W** 30–13 | 2–2 | Milwaukee County Stadium | 55,012 |
| 5 | October 4 | **Chicago Bears** | **W** 24–21 | 3–2 | Metropolitan Stadium | 43,827 |
| 6 | October 11 | at San Diego Chargers | **W** 33–31 | 4–2 | San Diego Jack Murphy Stadium | 50,708 |
| 7 | October 18 | Philadelphia Eagles | **W** 35–23 | 5–2 | Metropolitan Stadium | 45,459 |
| 8 | October 25 | at St. Louis Cardinals | **L** 17–30 | 5–3 | Civic Center Busch Memorial Stadium | 48,039 |
| 9 | November 2 | at Denver Broncos | **L** 17–19 | 5–4 | Mile High Stadium | 74,834 |
| 10 | November 8 | **Tampa Bay Buccaneers** | **W** 25–10 | 6–4 | Metropolitan Stadium | 47,038 |
| 11 | November 15 | New Orleans Saints | **W** 20–10 | 7–4 | Metropolitan Stadium | 45,215 |
| 12 | November 23 | at Atlanta Falcons | **L** 30–31 | 7–5 | Atlanta–Fulton County Stadium | 54,086 |
| 13 | November 29 | **Green Bay Packers** | **L** 23–35 | 7–6 | Metropolitan Stadium | 46,025 |
| 14 | December 6 | at **Chicago Bears** | **L** 9–10 | 7–7 | Soldier Field | 50,766 |
| 15 | December 12 | at **Detroit Lions** | **L** 7–45 | 7–8 | Pontiac Silverdome | 79,428 |
| 16 | December 20 | Kansas City Chiefs | **L** 6–10 | 7–9 | Metropolitan Stadium | 41,110 |

Note: Intra-division opponents are in bold text.

=== Game summaries ===
==== Week 1: at Tampa Bay Buccaneers ====
Week 1: Minnesota Vikings at Tampa Bay Buccaneers – Game summary

| Quarter | 1 | 2 | 3 | 4 | Total |
|---|---|---|---|---|---|
| Vikings | 0 | 0 | 6 | 7 | **13** |
| **Buccaneers** | 7 | 0 | 0 | 14 | **21** |

at Tampa Stadium, Tampa, Florida

- Date: September 5
- Game time: 8:05 p.m. EDT
- Game weather: Partly cloudy, showers, 80 °F (27 °C)
- Game attendance: 66,287
- Referee: Fred Silva (7)
- Recap, Game Book

Game information

**First quarter**

- TB – Kevin House 55-yard pass from Doug Williams (Garo Yepremian kick), 5:32. Buccaneers 7–0. **Drive: 5 plays, 80 yards, 2:17.**

**Second quarter**

- No scoring plays.

**Third quarter**

- MIN – Rick Danmeier 45-yard field goal, 10:41. Buccaneers 7–3. **Drive: 7 plays, 39 yards, 2:36.**
- MIN – Rick Danmeier 25-yard field goal, 0:33. Buccaneers 7–6. **Drive: 17 plays, 75 yards, 8:12.**

**Fourth quarter**

- TB – Doug Williams 10-yard run (Garo Yepremian kick), 13:17. Buccaneers 14–6. **Drive: 8 plays, 76 yards, 2:03.**
- MIN – Joe Senser 4-yard pass from Steve Dils (Rick Danmeier kick), 2:29. Buccaneers 14–13. **Drive: 14 plays, 72 yards, 2:39.**
- TB – Neal Colzie 82-yard interception return (Garo Yepremian kick), 0:21. Buccaneers 21–13.

**Top passers**

- MIN – Steve Dils – 37/62, 361 yards, TD, INT
- TB – Doug Williams – 8/22, 108 yards, TD

**Top rushers**

- MIN – Ted Brown – 20 rushes, 79 yards
- TB – Jerry Eckwood – 6 rushes, 36 yards

**Top receivers**

- MIN – Sammy White – 8 receptions, 92 yards
- TB – Kevin House – 3 receptions, 74 yards, TD

==== Week 2: vs Oakland Raiders ====
Week 2: Oakland Raiders at Minnesota Vikings – Game summary

| Quarter | 1 | 2 | 3 | 4 | Total |
|---|---|---|---|---|---|
| **Raiders** | 3 | 13 | 7 | 13 | **36** |
| Vikings | 0 | 7 | 3 | 0 | **10** |

at Metropolitan Stadium, Bloomington, Minnesota

- Date: September 14
- Game time: 8:05 p.m. CDT
- Game weather: Overcast, 65 °F (18 °C)
- Game attendance: 42,186
- Referee: Gene Barth
- Recap, Game Book

Game information

**First quarter**

- OAK – Chris Bahr 21-yard field goal, 1:59. Raiders 3–0. **Drive: 10 plays, 62 yards, 4:35.**

**Second quarter**

- OAK – Burgess Owens 29-yard interception return (Chris Bahr kick), 5:35. Raiders 10–0.
- OAK – Todd Christensen 21-yard pass from Jim Plunkett (kick blocked), 1:50. Raiders 16–0. **Drive: 5 plays, 50 yards, 1:58.**
- MIN – Eddie Payton 99-yard kickoff return (Rick Danmeier kick), 1:35. Raiders 16–7. **Drive: 0 plays, 0 yards, 0:15.**

**Third quarter**

- MIN – Rick Danmeier 37-yard field goal, 13:00. Raiders 16–10. **Drive: 7 plays, 61 yards, 2:00.**
- OAK – Morris Bradshaw 12-yard pass from Jim Plunkett (Chris Bahr kick), 8:54. Raiders 23–10. **Drive: 8 plays, 69 yards, 4:06.**

**Fourth quarter**

- OAK – Cedrick Hardman 52-yard fumble recovery (Chris Bahr kick), 8:45. Raiders 30–10.
- OAK – Malcolm Barnwell 61-yard pass from Marc Wilson (kick blocked), 4:14. Raiders 36–10. **Drive: 6 plays, 69 yards, 3:21.**

**Top passers**

- OAK – Jim Plunkett – 11/24, 109 yards, 2 TD, INT
- MIN – Steve Dils – 17/40, 246 yards, INT

**Top rushers**

- OAK – Kenny King – 14 rushes, 79 yards
- MIN – Jarvis Redwine – 4 rushes, 20 yards

**Top receivers**

- OAK – Malcolm Barnwell – 1 reception, 61 yards, TD
- MIN – Sammy White – 7 receptions, 140 yards

==== Week 3: vs Detroit Lions ====
Week 3: Detroit Lions at Minnesota Vikings – Game summary

| Quarter | 1 | 2 | 3 | 4 | Total |
|---|---|---|---|---|---|
| Lions | 0 | 14 | 7 | 3 | **24** |
| **Vikings** | 7 | 10 | 6 | 3 | **26** |

at Metropolitan Stadium, Bloomington, Minnesota

- Date: September 20
- Game time: 12:00 p.m. CDT
- Game weather: Sunny, 63 °F (17 °C)
- Game attendance: 45,350
- Referee: Gene Barth
- Recap, Game Book

Game information

**First quarter**

- MIN – Ted Brown 1-yard run (Rick Danmeier kick), 8:59. Vikings 7–0. **Drive: 10 plays, 80 yards, 4:23.**

**Second quarter**

- MIN – Joe Senser 4-yard pass from Tommy Kramer (Rick Danmeier kick), 11:56. Vikings 14–0. **Drive: 3 plays, 5 yards, 1:25.**
- DET – Billy Sims 2-yard run (Eddie Murray kick), 7:28. Vikings 14–7. **Drive: 9 plays, 73 yards, 4:28.**
- DET – Billy Sims 3-yard run (Eddie Murray kick), 1:13. Tied 14–14. **Drive: 8 plays, 77 yards, 3:41.**
- MIN – Rick Danmeier 39-yard field goal, 0:00. Vikings 17–14. **Drive: 10 plays, 58 yards, 1:13.**

**Third quarter**

- MIN – Ted Brown 41-yard pass from Tommy Kramer (kick blocked), 8:12. Vikings 23–14. **Drive: 5 plays, 98 yards, 2:22.**
- DET – Gary Danielson 1-yard run (Eddie Murray kick), 2:21. Vikings 23–21. **Drive: 5 plays, 12 yards, 3:35.**

**Fourth quarter**

- DET – Eddie Murray 25-yard field goal, 10:30. Lions 24–23. **Drive: 11 plays, 70 yards, 5:08.**
- MIN – Rick Danmeier 20-yard field goal, 0:04. Vikings 26–24. **Drive: 10 plays, 81 yards, 1:52.**

**Top passers**

- DET – Gary Danielson – 14/26, 232 yards, INT
- MIN – Tommy Kramer – 25/42, 333 yards, 2 TD, 2 INT

**Top rushers**

- DET – Billy Sims – 27 rushes, 112 yards, 2 TD
- MIN – Ted Brown – 18 rushes, 77 yards, TD

**Top receivers**

- DET – Freddie Scott – 5 receptions, 113 yards
- MIN – Ted Brown – 9 receptions, 115 yards, TD

==== Week 6: at San Diego Chargers ====
Week 6: Minnesota Vikings at San Diego Chargers – Game summary

| Quarter | 1 | 2 | 3 | 4 | Total |
|---|---|---|---|---|---|
| **Vikings** | 0 | 14 | 10 | 9 | **33** |
| Chargers | 7 | 7 | 10 | 7 | **31** |

at Jack Murphy Stadium, San Diego, California

- Date: October 11
- Game time: 1:00 p.m. PST
- Game weather: Partly cloudy, 71 °F (22 °C)
- Game attendance: 50,708
- Referee: Chuck Heberling
- Recap, Game Book

Game information

**First quarter**

- SD – Chuck Muncie 2-yard run (Rolf Benirschke kick), 3:11. Chargers 7–0. **Drive: 2 plays, 2 yards, 0:45.**

**Second quarter**

- MIN – Rickey Young 15-yard pass from Tommy Kramer (Rick Danmeier kick), 14:47. Tied 7–7. **Drive: 9 plays, 66 yards, 3:24.**
- MIN – Ted Brown 4-yard pass from Tommy Kramer (Rick Danmeier kick), 9:00. Vikings 14–7. **Drive: 11 plays, 71 yards, 5:10.**
- SD – Dwight Scales 60-yard pass from Dan Fouts (Rolf Benirschke kick), 6:45. Tied 14–14. **Drive: 4 plays, 73 yards, 2:15.**

**Third quarter**

- SD – Rolf Benirschke 39-yard field goal, 9:43. Chargers 17–14. **Drive: 8 plays, 48 yards, 3:32.**
- MIN – Terry LeCount 26-yard pass from Tommy Kramer (Rick Danmeier kick), 6:28. Vikings 21–17. **Drive: 7 plays, 92 yards, 3:15.**
- SD – Charlie Joiner 38-yard pass from Dan Fouts (Rolf Benirschke kick), 4:32. Chargers 24–21. **Drive: 6 plays, 74 yards, 1:56.**
- MIN – Rick Danmeier 28-yard field goal, 2:35. Tied 24–24. **Drive: 4 plays, 64 yards, 1:57.**

**Fourth quarter**

- SD – Chuck Muncie 1-yard run (Rolf Benirschke kick), 10:47. Chargers 31–24. **Drive: 15 plays, 74 yards, 6:48.**
- MIN – Terry LeCount 43-yard pass from Tommy Kramer (kick failed), 1:51. Chargers 31–30. **Drive: 4 plays, 72 yards, 0:35.**
- MIN – Rick Danmeier 38-yard field goal, 0:00. Vikings 33–31. **Drive: 5 plays, 22 yards, 1:45.**

**Top passers**

- MIN – Tommy Kramer – 27/43, 444 yards, 4 TD, 2 INT
- SD – Dan Fouts – 20/38, 310 yards, 2 TD

**Top rushers**

- MIN – Ted Brown – 21 rushes, 68 yards
- SD – Chuck Muncie – 21 rushes, 102 yards, 2 TD

**Top receivers**

- MIN – Terry LeCount – 6 receptions, 120 yards, 2 TD
- SD – Charlie Joiner – 6 receptions, 97 yards, TD

==== Week 7: vs Philadelphia Eagles ====
Week 7: Philadelphia Eagles at Minnesota Vikings – Game summary

| Quarter | 1 | 2 | 3 | 4 | Total |
|---|---|---|---|---|---|
| Eagles | 6 | 3 | 0 | 14 | **23** |
| **Vikings** | 0 | 21 | 7 | 7 | **35** |

at Metropolitan Stadium, Bloomington, Minnesota

- Date: October 18
- Game time: 12:00 p.m. CDT
- Game weather: Partly cloudy, 42 °F (6 °C)
- Game attendance: 45,459
- Referee: Fred Silva (7)
- Recap, Game Book

Game information

**First quarter**

- PHI – Wilbert Montgomery 1-yard run (kick blocked), 1:55. Eagles 6–0. **Drive: 5 plays, 59 yards, 2:45.**

**Second quarter**

- MIN – Joe Senser 11-yard pass from Tommy Kramer (Rick Danmeier kick), 11:42. Vikings 7–6. **Drive: 9 plays, 80 yards, 5:04.**
- PHI – Tony Franklin 30-yard field goal, 3:48. Eagles 9–7. **Drive: 8 plays, 63 yards, 4:00.**
- MIN – Sammy White 50-yard pass from Tommy Kramer (Rick Danmeier kick), 1:54. Vikings 14–9. **Drive: 5 plays, 68 yards, 1:44.**
- MIN – Bob Bruer 1-yard pass from Tommy Kramer (Rick Danmeier kick), 0:00. Vikings 21–9. **Drive: 9 plays, 67 yards, 1:06.**

**Third quarter**

- MIN – Ahmad Rashad 5-yard pass from Tommy Kramer (Rick Danmeier kick), 5:32. Vikings 28–9. **Drive: 8 plays, 29 yards, 2:41.**

**Fourth quarter**

- PHI – Wilbert Montgomery 25-yard pass from Ron Jaworski (Tony Franklin kick), 12:44. Vikings 28–16. **Drive: 7 plays, 86 yards, 2:51.**
- MIN – Ted Brown 1-yard run (Rick Danmeier kick), 5:20. Vikings 35–16. **Drive: 4 plays, 44 yards, 1:48.**
- PHI – Harold Carmichael 21-yard pass from Ron Jaworski (Tony Franklin kick), 2:47. Vikings 35–23. **Drive: 5 plays, 67 yards, 2:24.**

**Top passers**

- PHI – Ron Jaworski – 30/45, 345 yards, 2 TD, 2 INT
- MIN – Tommy Kramer – 24/46, 257 yards, 4 TD

**Top rushers**

- PHI – Wilbert Montgomery – 16 rushes, 62 yards, TD
- MIN – Ted Brown – 22 rushes, 92 yards, TD

**Top receivers**

- PHI – Wilbert Montgomery – 10 receptions, 143 yards, TD
- MIN – Joe Senser – 5 receptions, 88 yards, TD

==== Week 9: at Denver Broncos ====
Week 9: Minnesota Vikings at Denver Broncos – Game summary

| Quarter | 1 | 2 | 3 | 4 | Total |
|---|---|---|---|---|---|
| Vikings | 0 | 3 | 0 | 14 | **17** |
| **Broncos** | 0 | 3 | 3 | 13 | **19** |

at Mile High Stadium, Denver, Colorado

- Date: November 2
- Game time: 7:00 p.m. MST
- Game weather: Mostly fair, 48 °F (9 °C)
- Game attendance: 74,834
- Referee: Fred Wyant (11)
- Recap, Game Book

Game information

**First quarter**

- No scoring plays.

**Second quarter**

- DEN – Fred Steinfort 42-yard field goal, 4:06. Broncos 3–0. **Drive: 8 plays, 56 yards, 3:00.**
- MIN – Rick Danmeier 32-yard field goal, 0:18. Tied 3–3. **Drive: 11 plays, 64 yards, 3:48.**

**Third quarter**

- DEN – Fred Steinfort 49-yard field goal, 7:29. Broncos 6–3. **Drive: 11 plays, 48 yards, 4:39.**

**Fourth quarter**

- DEN – Rob Lytle 5-yard run (kick failed), 10:16. Broncos 12–3. **Drive: 12 plays, 94 yards, 5:52.**
- DEN – Steve Watson 15-yard pass from Craig Morton (Fred Steinfort kick), 8:32. Broncos 19–3. **Drive: 2 plays, 18 yards, 0:36.**
- MIN – Tony Galbreath 1-yard run (Rick Danmeier kick), 5:07. Broncos 19–10. **Drive: 9 plays, 80 yards, 3:25.**
- MIN – Tony Galbreath 1-yard run (Rick Danmeier kick), 2:40. Broncos 19–17. **Drive: 2 plays, 39 yards, 0:15.**

**Top passers**

- MIN – Tommy Kramer – 22/36, 230 yards, INT
- DEN – Craig Morton – 16/28, 201 yards, TD

**Top rushers**

- MIN – Ted Brown – 14 rushes, 47 yards
- DEN – Rick Parros – 12 rushes, 65 yards

**Top receivers**

- MIN – Joe Senser – 6 receptions, 73 yards
- DEN – Ron Egloff – 2 receptions, 62 yards

==== Week 10: vs Tampa Bay Buccaneers ====
Week 10: Tampa Bay Buccaneers at Minnesota Vikings – Game summary

| Quarter | 1 | 2 | 3 | 4 | Total |
|---|---|---|---|---|---|
| Buccaneers | 0 | 0 | 3 | 7 | **10** |
| **Vikings** | 3 | 13 | 7 | 2 | **25** |

at Metropolitan Stadium, Bloomington, Minnesota

- Date: November 8
- Game time: 12:00 p.m. CST
- Game attendance: 47,038
- Referee: Red Cashion
- Recap, Game Book

Game information

**First quarter**

- MIN – Rick Danmeier 33-yard field goal, 4:47. Vikings 3–0. **Drive: 7 plays, 23 yards, 3:05.**

**Second quarter**

- MIN – Rick Danmeier 38-yard field goal, 13:33. Vikings 6–0. **Drive: 4 plays, 1 yard, 0:19.**
- MIN – Ted Brown 2-yard run (Rick Danmeier kick), 1:09. Vikings 13–0. **Drive: 17 plays, 95 yards, 9:04.**
- MIN – Rick Danmeier 41-yard field goal, 0:00. Vikings 16–0. **Drive: 7 plays, 47 yards, 0:40.**

**Third quarter**

- MIN – Rickey Young 1-yard pass from Tommy Kramer (Rick Danmeier kick), 11:35. Vikings 23–0. **Drive: 9 plays, 76 yards, 3:25.**
- TB – Bill Capece 27-yard field goal, 3:17. Vikings 23–3. **Drive: 4 plays, 5 yards, 2:15.**

**Fourth quarter**

- MIN – Doug Williams sacked in the end zone by Mark Mullaney and James White for a safety, 13:08. Vikings 25–3.
- TB – Jimmie Giles 1-yard pass from Doug Williams (Bill Capece kick), 9:28. Vikings 25–10. **Drive: 6 plays, 78 yards, 1:54.**

**Top passers**

- TB – Doug Williams – 13/27, 154 yards, TD
- MIN – Tommy Kramer – 24/41, 228 yards, TD, 2 INT

**Top rushers**

- TB – Doug Williams – 3 rushes, 20 yards
- MIN – Ted Brown – 31 rushes, 129 yards, TD

**Top receivers**

- TB – Kevin House – 3 receptions, 70 yards
- MIN – Joe Senser – 8 receptions, 101 yards

==== Week 11: vs New Orleans Saints ====
Week 11: New Orleans Saints at Minnesota Vikings – Game summary

| Quarter | 1 | 2 | 3 | 4 | Total |
|---|---|---|---|---|---|
| Saints | 0 | 3 | 0 | 7 | **10** |
| **Vikings** | 0 | 10 | 10 | 0 | **20** |

at Metropolitan Stadium, Bloomington, Minnesota

- Date: November 15
- Game time: 12:00 p.m. CST
- Game weather: Cloudy, high overcast, 55 °F (13 °C)
- Game attendance: 45,215
- Referee: Dick Jorgensen
- Recap, Game Book

Game information

**First quarter**

- No scoring plays.

**Second quarter**

- MIN – Rick Danmeier 35-yard field goal, 9:35. Vikings 3–0. **Drive: 10 plays, 65 yards, 3:32.**
- NO – Benny Ricardo 24-yard field goal, 4:26. Tied 3–3. **Drive: 11 plays, 69 yards, 5:09.**
- MIN – Joe Senser 11-yard pass from Tommy Kramer (Rick Danmeier kick), 0:19. Vikings 10–3. **Drive: 12 plays, 80 yards, 3:12.**

**Third quarter**

- MIN – Rick Danmeier 19-yard field goal, 8:29. Vikings 13–3. **Drive: 15 plays, 78 yards, 6:31.**
- MIN – Ted Brown 9-yard run (Rick Danmeier kick), 5:36. Vikings 20–3. **Drive: 4 plays, 62 yards, 1:45.**

**Fourth quarter**

- NO – George Rogers 1-yard run (Benny Ricardo kick), 6:59. Vikings 20–10. **Drive: 8 plays, 60 yards, 4:54.**

**Top passers**

- NO – Dave Wilson – 19/39, 244 yards, 2 INT
- MIN – Tommy Kramer – 19/40, 287 yards, TD

**Top rushers**

- NO – George Rogers – 31 rushes, 97 yards, TD
- MIN – Ted Brown – 16 rushes, 54 yards, TD

**Top receivers**

- NO – Wayne Wilson – 3 receptions, 71 yards
- MIN – Joe Senser – 7 receptions, 92 yards, TD

==== Week 16: vs Kansas City Chiefs ====
Week 16: Kansas City Chiefs at Minnesota Vikings – Game summary

| Quarter | 1 | 2 | 3 | 4 | Total |
|---|---|---|---|---|---|
| **Chiefs** | 3 | 0 | 7 | 0 | **10** |
| Vikings | 3 | 0 | 3 | 0 | **6** |

at Metropolitan Stadium, Bloomington, Minnesota

- Date: December 20
- Game time: 12:00 p.m. CST
- Game attendance: 41,110
- Referee: Tom Dooley
- Recap, Game Book

Game information

**First quarter**

- MIN – Rick Danmeier 43-yard field goal, 10:33. Vikings 3–0. **Drive: 14 plays, 50 yards, 4:27.**
- KC – Nick Lowery 30-yard field goal, 1:12. Tied 3–3. **Drive: 4 plays, 9 yards, 1:41.**

**Second quarter**

- No scoring plays.

**Third quarter**

- KC – Stan Rome 15-yard pass from Steve Fuller (Nick Lowery kick), 10:03. Chiefs 10–3. **Drive: 8 plays, 37 yards, 4:57.**
- MIN – Rick Danmeier 33-yard field goal, 4:30. Chiefs 10–6. **Drive: 6 plays, 30 yards, 1:15.**

**Fourth quarter**

- No scoring plays.

**Top passers**

- KC – Steve Fuller – 12/16, 145 yards, TD, INT
- MIN – Tommy Kramer – 17/38, 177 yards, INT

**Top rushers**

- KC – Billy Jackson – 25 rushes, 102 yards
- MIN – Tony Galbreath – 11 rushes, 55 yards

**Top receivers**

- KC – Carlos Carson – 3 receptions, 78 yards
- MIN – Tony Galbreath – 7 receptions, 60 yards

=== Standings ===
NFC Central
| | W | L | T | PCT | DIV | CONF | PF | PA | STK |
|---|---|---|---|---|---|---|---|---|---|
| ^{(3)} Tampa Bay Buccaneers | 9 | 7 | 0 | .563 | 6–2 | 9–3 | 315 | 268 | W1 |
| Detroit Lions | 8 | 8 | 0 | .500 | 4–4 | 6–6 | 397 | 322 | L1 |
| Green Bay Packers | 8 | 8 | 0 | .500 | 4–4 | 7–7 | 324 | 361 | L1 |
| Minnesota Vikings | 7 | 9 | 0 | .438 | 4–4 | 6–6 | 325 | 369 | L5 |
| Chicago Bears | 6 | 10 | 0 | .375 | 2–6 | 2–10 | 253 | 324 | W3 |

== Statistics ==
=== Team leaders ===
| Category | Player(s) | Value |
|---|---|---|
| Passing yards | Tommy Kramer | 3,912 |
| Passing touchdowns | Tommy Kramer | 26 |
| Rushing yards | Ted Brown | 1,063 |
| Rushing touchdowns | Ted Brown | 6 |
| Receiving yards | Joe Senser | 1,004 |
| Receiving touchdowns | Joe Senser | 8 |
| Points | Rick Danmeier | 97 |
| Kickoff return yards | Eddie Payton | 898 |
| Punt return yards | Eddie Payton | 303 |
| Tackles | Scott Studwell | 230 |
| Interceptions | Tommy Hannon; Willie Teal | 4 |

- Vikings single season record although tackles were not official until 2001.

=== League rankings ===
| Category | Total yards | Yards per game | NFL rank (out of 28) |
|---|---|---|---|
| Passing offense | 4,333 | 270.8 | 2nd |
| Rushing offense | 1,512 | 94.5 | 28th |
| Total offense | 5,845 | 365.3 | 6th |
| Passing defense | 3,328 | 208.0 | 18th |
| Rushing defense | 2,045 | 127.8 | 15th |
| Total defense | 5,373 | 335.8 | 17th |
