= 1982 Minnesota Vikings season =

NFL team season; first one in the Metrodome

- General manager: Mike Lynn
- Head coach: Bud Grant
- Offensive coordinator: Jerry Burns
- Defensive coordinator: Bob Hollway
- Home stadium: Hubert H. Humphrey Metrodome

Results
- Record: 5–4
- Division place: 4th NFC (2nd NFC Central)
- Playoffs: Won Wild Card Playoffs (vs. Falcons) 30–24; Lost Divisional Playoffs (at Redskins) 7–21
- Pro Bowlers: LB Matt Blair

Uniform
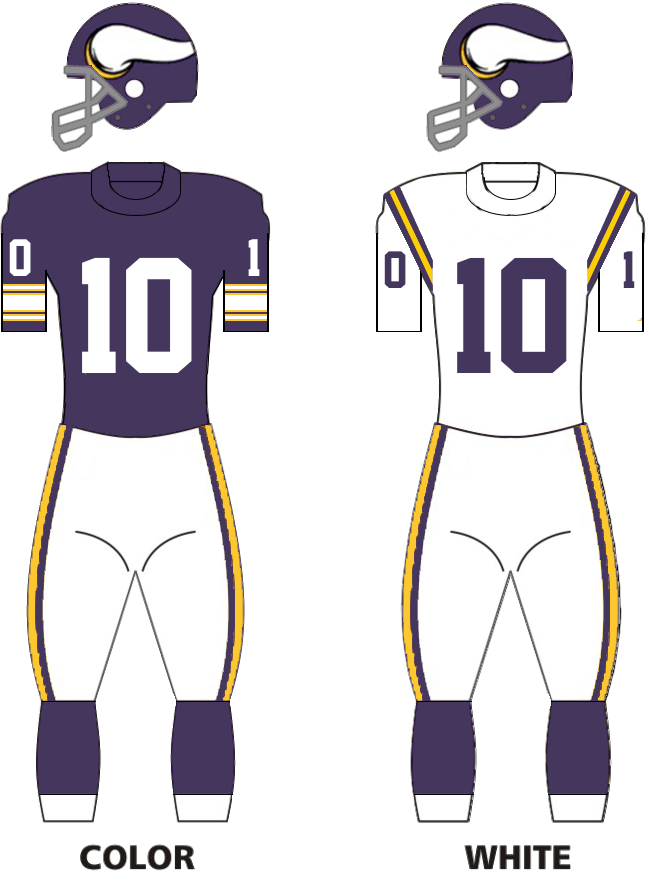

The 1982 Minnesota Vikings season was the team's 22nd season in the National Football League (NFL) and their first in the newly constructed Hubert H. Humphrey Metrodome. The team was looking to improve on its 7–9 record from 1981. However, a players strike meant seven of the team's 16 games were canceled, and each NFL team was only able to play nine games. The Vikings won their opener against the Tampa Bay Buccaneers before losing the next week to the Buffalo Bills, a game in which they had a 19–0 lead before the Bills pulled off a comeback to win 23–22.

After the strike ended, the Vikings lost 26–7 to the Packers in Green Bay before beating the Bears 35–7 the following week to sit at 2–2. After a loss to the Dolphins, the Vikings won their next two games to sit at 4–3. In their final game of the season, they upset the Dallas Cowboys 31–27 to clinch the NFC's fourth place spot in the playoffs (Note: Divisions were ignored in 1982 and standings were determined by conference.) In the playoffs, the Vikings defeated the Atlanta Falcons 30–24 to reach the divisional round. However, in that game, they lost 21–7 to the eventual champion Redskins.

== Offseason ==
=== 1982 draft ===
Pro Bowler

1982 Minnesota Vikings Draft
Draft order		Player name	Position	College	Notes
Round	Selection	Player name	Position	College	Notes
1	7	Darrin Nelson	Running back	Stanford	
2	39	Terry Tausch	Guard	Texas	
3	66	Traded to the New Orleans Saints (Note: The Vikings traded their third-round selection (66th overall) to the Saints in exchange for RB Tony Galbreath.)			
4	92	Jim Fahnhorst	Linebacker	Minnesota	
5	120	Traded to the Miami Dolphins (Note: The Vikings traded their fifth-round selection (120th overall) and a 1981 sixth-round selection (154th overall) to the Dolphins in exchange for C Jim Langer.)			
6	147	Greg Storr	Linebacker	Boston College	
7	179	Steve Jordan	Tight end	Brown	
8	206	Kirk Harmon	Linebacker	Pacific	
9	233	Bryan Howard	Defensive back	Tennessee State	
10	260	Gerald Lucear	Wide receiver	Temple	
11	286	Curtis Rouse	Guard	Chattanooga	
12	318	Hobson Milner	Running back	Cincinnati	

== Roster ==
1982 Minnesota Vikings roster
Quarterbacks (QB): 12 Steve Dils; 9 Tommy Kramer; 11 Wade Wilson; Running backs (RB): 23 Ted Brown; 32 Tony Galbreath; 36 Sam Harrell; 20 Darrin Nelson; 31 Eddie Payton; 22 Jarvis Redwine; 34 Rickey Young; Wide receivers (WR): 89 Harold Jackson; 80 Terry LeCount; 87 Leo Lewis; 84 Sam McCullum; 85 Sammy White; Tight ends (TE): 83 Steve Jordan; 81 Joe Senser	Offensive linemen (OL): 62 Brent Boyd G; 61 Wes Hamilton G; 51 Jim Hough G; 56 Dave Huffman C/G; 76 Tim Irwin T; 78 Steve Riley T; 68 Curtis Rouse G/T; 67 Dennis Swilley C; 66 Terry Tausch T; Defensive linemen (DL): 75 Randy Holloway DE; 65 Charlie Johnson NT; 79 Doug Martin DE; 77 Mark Mullaney DE; 72 James White NT; 91 Ray Yakavonis DE	Linebackers (LB): 59 Matt Blair OLB; 52 Dennis Johnson ILB; 53 Henry Johnson ILB; 54 Fred McNeill OLB; 57 Robin Sendlein OLB; 50 Jeff Siemon ILB; 55 Scott Studwell ILB; Defensive backs (DB): 21 Rufus Bess CB; 45 Tommy Hannon SS; 24 Bryan Howard SS; 25 Kurt Knoff FS; 49 Keith Nord FS; 29 John Swain CB; 37 Willie Teal CB; 27 John Turner FS/CB; Special teams (ST): 8 Greg Coleman P; 7 Rick Danmeier K	Reserve: 82 Bob Bruer TE (IR); 73 Neil Elshire DE (IR); 88 Mardye McDole WR (IR); 28 Ahmad Rashad WR (IR); 71 Bill Stephanos T (IR); -- Greg Storr LB (NF-Inj.); Rookies in italics

== Preseason ==
Week	Date	Opponent	Result	Record	Venue	Attendance
1	August 7	Baltimore Colts (Note: Hall of Fame Game)	W 30–14	1–0	Fawcett Stadium (Canton, Ohio)	23,379
2	August 14	at Atlanta Falcons	L 17–20	1–1	Atlanta–Fulton County Stadium	49,831
3	August 21	Seattle Seahawks	W 7–3	2–1	Hubert H. Humphrey Metrodome (Note: First Vikings game at the Metrodome)	57,880
4	August 28	at Denver Broncos	L 17–27	2–2	Mile High Stadium	73,371
5	September 3	New Orleans Saints	W 24–21	3–2	Hubert H. Humphrey Metrodome	59,810

== Regular season ==
The Vikings opened their new stadium with a 17–10 win over Tampa Bay in the season opener. A close loss to Buffalo on the road followed.

The season was then interrupted by the players' 57-day strike that reduced the NFL regular season to nine games. Upon resumption of play in November, the Vikings went 4–3 to close out the abbreviated regular season and closed the campaign with a 5–4 record. Games against Chicago, Detroit, Green Bay, New Orleans, San Francisco, Tampa Bay and Washington were canceled.

As three of Minnesota's losses were to AFC opponents, their 4–1 conference record put them at the top of a logjam of teams with similar records in the playoff seedings. In 1982, the NFL took the top eight teams from each conference regardless of division record for playoff consideration. The Vikings earned the #4 seed based on this tiebreaker and home field advantage in round one.

In their opening round playoff game, the Vikings took on the Atlanta Falcons. The game was a back-and-forth affair that saw Minnesota take a 13–7 halftime lead, only to see the Falcons retake the lead late in the final period on a 41-yard field goal by Mick Luckhurst. With just under two minutes remaining, the Vikings began a game-winning drive that culminated in a Ted Brown 5-yard touchdown run to win the game and send the Vikings on to round two.

In the second round, the Vikings were defeated by the eventual Super Bowl champion Washington Redskins, 21–7, at RFK Stadium. The Vikings trailed 14–0 after one quarter. Ted Brown's touchdown run in the second period cut it to 14–7, but Joe Theismann hit Alvin Garrett late in the quarter with an 18-yard touchdown strike to make it 21–7. Neither team scored in the second half.

QB Tommy Kramer threw for 2,037 yards and 15 touchdowns in the short season. RB Ted Brown had 515 yards to lead all rushers, and WR Sammy White tallied 503 yards and five touchdowns to lead receivers.

LB Matt Blair anchored the Vikings defense and also made the 1982 Pro Bowl.

=== Schedule ===
Week	Original week	Date	Opponent	Result	Record	Venue	Attendance
1	1	September 12	**Tampa Bay Buccaneers**	**W** 17–10	1–0	Hubert H. Humphrey Metrodome	58,440
2	2	September 16	at Buffalo Bills	**L** 22–23	1–1	Rich Stadium	77,753
—	3	September 26	Dallas Cowboys	Postponed	1–1	Hubert H. Humphrey Metrodome	1982 NFL players strike
—	4	October 3	at Chicago Bears	Canceled	1–1	Soldier Field	1982 NFL players strike
—	5	October 10	at Tampa Bay Buccaneers	Canceled	1–1	Tampa Stadium	1982 NFL players strike
—	6	October 17	New Orleans Saints	Canceled	1–1	Hubert H. Humphrey Metrodome	1982 NFL players strike
—	7	October 24	Green Bay Packers	Canceled	1–1	Hubert H. Humphrey Metrodome	1982 NFL players strike
—	8	November 1	Detroit Lions	Canceled	1–1	Hubert H. Humphrey Metrodome	1982 NFL players strike
—	9	November 7	at San Francisco 49ers	Canceled	1–1	Candlestick Park	1982 NFL players strike
—	10	November 14	at Washington Redskins	Canceled	1–1	Robert F. Kennedy Memorial Stadium	1982 NFL players strike
3	11	November 21	at **Green Bay Packers**	**L** 7–26	1–2	Milwaukee County Stadium	44,681
4	12	November 28	**Chicago Bears**	**W** 35–7	2–2	Hubert H. Humphrey Metrodome	54,724
5	13	December 5	at Miami Dolphins	**L** 14–22	2–3	Miami Orange Bowl	45,721
6	14	December 12	Baltimore Colts	**W** 13–10	3–3	Hubert H. Humphrey Metrodome	53,981
7	15	December 19	at **Detroit Lions**	**W** 34–31	4–3	Pontiac Silverdome	73,058
8	16	December 26	New York Jets	**L** 14–42	4–4	Hubert H. Humphrey Metrodome	58,672
9	17	January 3	Dallas Cowboys	**W** 31–27	5–4	Hubert H. Humphrey Metrodome	60,007
Note: Intra-division opponents are in **bold** text.

=== Game summaries ===
==== Week 1: vs Tampa Bay Buccaneers ====
Week 1: Tampa Bay Buccaneers at Minnesota Vikings – Game summary

Quarter	1	2	3	4	Total
Buccaneers	3	0	0	7	**10**
**Vikings**	0	7	7	3	**17**

at Hubert H. Humphrey Metrodome, Minneapolis, Minnesota

- Date: September 12
- Game time: 12:00 p.m. CDT
- Game weather: None (indoor stadium)
- Game attendance: 58,440
- Referee: Gene Barth
- Recap, Game Book

Game information

**First quarter**

- TB – Bill Capece 51-yard field goal, 2:00. Buccaneers 3–0. **Drive: 8 plays, 47 yards, 4:55.**

**Second quarter**

- MIN – Rickey Young 3-yard run (Rick Danmeier kick), 6:31. Vikings 7–3. **Drive: 12 plays, 77 yards, 5:19.**

**Third quarter**

- MIN – Sammy White 22-yard pass from Tommy Kramer (Rick Danmeier kick), 6:48. Vikings 14–3. **Drive: 14 plays, 81 yards, 8:12.**

**Fourth quarter**

- TB – Jimmie Giles 20-yard pass from Doug Williams (Bill Capece kick), 5:06. Vikings 14–10. **Drive: 9 plays, 80 yards, 3:30.**
- MIN – Rick Danmeier 33-yard field goal, 2:06. Vikings 17–10. **Drive: 4 plays, 7 yards, 1:13.**

**Top passers**

- TB – Doug Williams – 21/38, 290 yards, TD, 3 INT
- MIN – Tommy Kramer – 16/28, 131 yards, TD

**Top rushers**

- TB – James Owens – 12 rushes, 31 yards
- MIN – Ted Brown – 12 rushes, 56 yards

**Top receivers**

- TB – Jimmie Giles – 5 receptions, 100 yards, TD
- MIN – Sammy White – 2 receptions, 35 yards, TD

==== Week 4: vs Chicago Bears ====
Week 4: Chicago Bears at Minnesota Vikings – Game summary

Quarter	1	2	3	4	Total
Bears	0	7	0	0	**7**
**Vikings**	0	14	7	14	**35**

at Hubert H. Humphrey Metrodome, Minneapolis, Minnesota

- Date: November 28
- Game time: 12:00 p.m. CST
- Game weather: None (indoor stadium)
- Game attendance: 54,724
- Referee: Red Cashion
- Recap, Game Book

Game information

**First quarter**

- No scoring plays.

**Second quarter**

- CHI – Emery Moorehead 50-yard pass from Jim McMahon (John Roveto kick), 14:53. Bears 7–0. **Drive: 2 plays, 55 yards, 0:47.**
- MIN – Sammy White 5-yard pass from Tommy Kramer (Rick Danmeier kick), 9:07. Tied 7–7. **Drive: 4 plays, 49 yards, 2:16.**
- MIN – Joe Senser 1-yard pass from Tommy Kramer (Rick Danmeier kick), 2:43. Vikings 14–7. **Drive: 8 plays, 42 yards, 3:45.**

**Third quarter**

- MIN – Sammy White 8-yard pass from Tommy Kramer (Rick Danmeier kick), 5:44. Vikings 21–7. **Drive: 8 plays, 95 yards, 3:37.**

**Fourth quarter**

- MIN – Leo Lewis 31-yard pass from Tommy Kramer (Rick Danmeier kick), 12:48. Vikings 28–7. **Drive: 2 plays, 43 yards, 0:52.**
- MIN – Sammy White 13-yard pass from Tommy Kramer (Rick Danmeier kick), 6:17. Vikings 35–7. **Drive: 6 plays, 67 yards, 2:38.**

**Top passers**

- CHI – Jim McMahon – 12/20, 139 yards, TD, INT
- MIN – Tommy Kramer – 26/35, 342 yards, 5 TD, 2 INT

**Top rushers**

- CHI – Walter Payton – 12 rushes, 67 yards
- MIN – Ted Brown – 5 rushes, 43 yards

**Top receivers**

- CHI – Emery Moorehead – 4 receptions, 79 yards, TD
- MIN – Sammy White – 10 receptions, 177 yards, 3 TD

==== Week 5: at Miami Dolphins ====
Week 5: Minnesota Vikings at Miami Dolphins – Game summary

Quarter	1	2	3	4	Total
Vikings	0	7	0	7	**14**
**Dolphins**	6	3	3	10	**22**

at Miami Orange Bowl, Miami, Florida

- Date: December 5
- Game time: 1:00 p.m. EST
- Game weather: Clear, 82 °F (27.8 °C)
- Game attendance: 45,721
- Referee: Fred Silva
- Recap, Game Book

Game information

**First quarter**

- MIA – David Woodley 1-yard run (kick blocked), 2:48. Dolphins 6–0. **Drive: 9 plays, 64 yards, 5:08.**

**Second quarter**

- MIN – Tommy Kramer 18-yard run (Rick Danmeier kick), 12:10. Vikings 7–6. **Drive: 11 plays, 82 yards, 5:38.**
- MIA – Uwe von Schamann 34-yard field goal, 0:00. Dolphins 9–7. **Drive: 3 plays, 36 yards, 0:17.**

**Third quarter**

- MIA – Uwe von Schamann 28-yard field goal, 5:48. Dolphins 12–7. **Drive: 16 plays, 62 yards, 9:12.**

**Fourth quarter**

- MIA – Andra Franklin 9-yard run (Uwe von Schamann kick), 14:17. Dolphins 19–7. **Drive: 8 plays, 52 yards, 4:12.**
- MIN – Tony Galbreath 1-yard run (Rick Danmeier kick), 9:25. Dolphins 19–14. **Drive: 5 plays, 22 yards, 2:22.**
- MIA – Uwe von Schamann 24-yard field goal, 1:46. Dolphins 22–14. **Drive: 6 plays, 23 yards, 2:44.**

**Top passers**

- MIN – Tommy Kramer – 16/28, 127 yards, 3 INT
- MIA – David Woodley – 13/20, 132 yards

**Top rushers**

- MIN – Darrin Nelson – 6 rushes, 36 yards
- MIA – Andra Franklin – 28 rushes, 129 yards, TD

**Top receivers**

- MIN – Sammy White – 2 receptions, 32 yards
- MIA – Jimmy Cefalo – 2 receptions, 71 yards

==== Week 6: vs Baltimore Colts ====
Week 6: Baltimore Colts at Minnesota Vikings – Game summary

Quarter	1	2	3	4	Total
Colts	0	3	7	0	**10**
**Vikings**	7	0	3	3	**13**

at Hubert H. Humphrey Metrodome, Minneapolis, Minnesota

- Date: December 12
- Game time: 12:00 p.m. CST
- Game weather: None (indoor stadium)
- Game attendance: 53,981
- Referee: Jerry Markbreit
- Recap, Game Book

Game information

**First quarter**

- MIN – Sammy White 24-yard pass from Tommy Kramer (Rick Danmeier kick), 4:49. Vikings 7–0. **Drive: 10 plays, 65 yards, 4:43.**

**Second quarter**

- BAL – Mike Wood 39-yard field goal, 10:57. Vikings 7–3. **Drive: 13 plays, 56 yards, 6:50.**

**Third quarter**

- BAL – Jim Burroughs 94-yard interception return (Mike Wood kick), 6:42. Colts 10–7.
- MIN – Rick Danmeier 23-yard field goal, 3:21. Tied 10–10. **Drive: 9 plays, 56 yards, 3:11.**

**Fourth quarter**

- MIN – Rick Danmeier 40-yard field goal, 9:09. Vikings 13–10. **Drive: 9 plays, 48 yards, 4:41.**

**Top passers**

- BAL – Mike Pagel – 14/32, 116 yards, 2 INT
- MIN – Tommy Kramer – 19/35, 258 yards, TD, INT

**Top rushers**

- BAL – Curtis Dickey – 13 rushes, 42 yards
- MIN – Ted Brown – 20 rushes, 75 yards

**Top receivers**

- BAL – Randy McMillan – 5 receptions, 32 yards
- MIN – Sammy White – 3 receptions, 78 yards, TD

==== Week 8: vs New York Jets ====
Week 8: New York Jets at Minnesota Vikings – Game summary

Quarter	1	2	3	4	Total
**Jets**	7	14	7	14	**42**
Vikings	0	7	0	7	**14**

at Hubert H. Humphrey Metrodome, Minneapolis, Minnesota

- Date: December 26
- Game time: 3:00 p.m. CST
- Game weather: None (indoor stadium)
- Game attendance: 58,672
- Referee: Gene Barth
- Recap, Game Book

Game information

**First quarter**

- NYJ – Freeman McNeil 2-yard run (Pat Leahy kick), 6:07. Jets 7–0. **Drive: 8 plays, 80 yards, 4:54.**

**Second quarter**

- NYJ – Bobby Jackson 80-yard return of blocked field goal (Pat Leahy kick), 5:43. Jets 14–0.
- NYJ – Freeman McNeil 1-yard run (Pat Leahy kick), 5:17. Jets 21–0. **Drive: 3 plays, 9 yards, 0:22.**
- MIN – Tommy Kramer 1-yard run (Rick Danmeier kick), 0:32. Jets 21–7. **Drive: 11 plays, 84 yards, 4:25.**

**Third quarter**

- NYJ – Mickey Shuler 20-yard pass from Pat Ryan (Pat Leahy kick), 1:12. Jets 28–7. **Drive: 8 plays, 86 yards, 2:32.**

**Fourth quarter**

- MIN – Ted Brown 16-yard pass from Tommy Kramer (Rick Danmeier kick), 13:23. Jets 28–14. **Drive: 7 plays, 76 yards, 2:36.**
- NYJ – Bruce Harper 39-yard pass from Richard Todd (Pat Leahy kick), 11:33. Jets 35–14. **Drive: 5 plays, 65 yards, 1:38.**
- NYJ – Bobby Jackson 77-yard interception return (Pat Leahy kick), 7:18. Jets 42–14.

**Top passers**

- NYJ – Richard Todd – 15/22, 236 yards, TD
- MIN – Tommy Kramer – 32/56, 328 yards, TD, 3 INT

**Top rushers**

- NYJ – Freeman McNeil – 18 rushes, 82 yards, 2 TD
- MIN – Ted Brown – 15 rushes, 57 yards

**Top receivers**

- NYJ – Mickey Shuler – 3 receptions, 80 yards, TD
- MIN – Joe Senser – 10 receptions, 115 yards

=== Standings ===
NFC Central
	W	L	T	PCT	DIV	CONF	PF	PA	STK
Green Bay Packers^{(3)}	5	3	1	.611	1–2	4–2	226	169	L1
Minnesota Vikings^{(4)}	5	4	0	.556	3–1	4–1	158	178	W3
Tampa Bay Buccaneers^{(7)}	5	4	0	.556	2–1	3–3	158	178	W1
Detroit Lions^{(8)}	4	5	0	.444	3–3	4–4	181	176	W1
Chicago Bears	3	6	0	.333	1–3	2–5	141	174	L1

NFC
#	Team	W	L	T	PCT	PF	PA	STK
**Seeded postseason qualifiers**
1	Washington Redskins	8	1	0	.889	190	128	W4
2	Dallas Cowboys	6	3	0	.667	226	145	L2
3	Green Bay Packers	5	3	1	.611	226	169	L1
4 (Note: Minnesota (4–1), Atlanta (4–3), St. Louis (5–4), Tampa Bay (3–3) seeds were determined by best won-lost record in conference games.)	Minnesota Vikings	5	4	0	.556	187	198	W1
5	Atlanta Falcons	5	4	0	.556	183	199	L2
6	St. Louis Cardinals	5	4	0	.556	135	170	L1
7	Tampa Bay Buccaneers	5	4	0	.556	158	178	W3
8 (Note: Detroit finished ahead of New Orleans and the N.Y. Giants based on best conference record (4–4 to Saints’ 3–5 to Giants’ 3–5).)	Detroit Lions	4	5	0	.444	181	176	W1
**Did not qualify for the postseason**
9	New Orleans Saints	4	5	0	.444	129	160	W1
10	New York Giants	4	5	0	.444	164	160	W1
11 (Note: San Francisco finished ahead of Chicago, and Chicago finished ahead of Philadelphia, based on conference record (49ers’ 2–3 to Bears’ 2–5 to Eagles’ 1–5).)	San Francisco 49ers	3	6	0	.333	209	206	L1
12	Chicago Bears	3	6	0	.333	141	174	L1
13	Philadelphia Eagles	3	6	0	.333	191	195	L1
14	Los Angeles Rams	2	7	0	.222	200	250	W1
**Tiebreakers**

== Postseason ==
=== Schedule ===
Round	Date	Opponent	Result	Record	Venue	Attendance
Wild Card	January 9	Atlanta Falcons (5)	W 30–24	1–0	Hubert H. Humphrey Metrodome	60,560
Division	January 15	at Washington Redskins (1)	L 7–21	1–1	Robert F. Kennedy Memorial Stadium	54,593

== Statistics ==
=== Team leaders ===
Category	Player(s)	Value
Passing yards	Tommy Kramer	2,037
Passing touchdowns	Tommy Kramer	15
Rushing yards	Ted Brown	515
Rushing touchdowns	Tommy Kramer	3
Receiving yards	Sammy White	503
Receiving touchdowns	Sammy White	5
Points	Rick Danmeier	47
Kickoff return yards	Jarvis Redwine	286
Punt return yards	Eddie Payton	179
Sacks	Doug Martin	11.5
Interceptions	Willie Teal	4

=== League rankings ===
Category	Total yards	Yards per game	NFL rank (out of 28)
Passing offense	1,967	122.9	5th
Rushing offense	912	57.0	22nd
Total offense	2,879	179.9	14th
Passing defense	1,875	117.2	20th
Rushing defense	1,020	63.8	14th
Total defense	2,895	180.9	19th
