= List of Minnesota Vikings team records =

The Minnesota Vikings is an American football franchise based in Minneapolis, Minnesota. The team was established in 1961 and is part of the National Football League's NFC North division. Since then, the team has taken part in the NFL playoffs 31 times, reaching four Super Bowls in 1970, 1974, 1975 and 1977.

This list encompasses the major records set by the team, its coaches and its players. The players section of this page lists the individual records for passing, rushing and receiving, as well as selected defensive records. The team has had three full-time home stadiums since its establishment – Metropolitan Stadium, Hubert H. Humphrey Metrodome, and U.S. Bank Stadium; attendance records, both home and away, are included on this page.

== All-time series ==
The Vikings have played against every other team in the NFL at least five times each in the regular season. They have a winning record against 20 teams, a losing record against 10 and an even record against one: the Cincinnati Bengals, whom they have played 14 times, winning seven each. The Vikings' best record is against the Houston Texans – they have won each of the six meetings between the two teams – and their worst record is against the Baltimore/Indianapolis Colts, whom they have beaten eight times in 26 meetings for a win percentage of .327. Their fewest wins against a specific franchise is three, in seven meetings with the Baltimore Ravens (.429). The Vikings have recorded the most wins in their history against the Detroit Lions (80), as well as the most points (2,690). The Vikings have conceded the most points to the Green Bay Packers (2,802), who are also the team against whom they have suffered the most losses (63) and ties (3).

In the postseason, the Vikings have faced 18 different opponents, but they only have a win percentage of .500 or higher against six of them. The Vikings' best postseason win percentage is against the Arizona Cardinals and the Cleveland Browns, whom they have beaten every time they have met – the Cardinals twice and the Browns once; meanwhile, they have faced eight teams without recording a single win, the worst being against the Philadelphia Eagles, whom they have met four times without winning. The Vikings have recorded their most postseason wins against the Los Angeles Rams, whom they have beaten five times in seven meetings, and their most losses against the San Francisco 49ers, to whom they have lost five times in six meetings. The Vikings have also conceded their most postseason points against the 49ers (181), and scored their most against the New Orleans Saints (161). As well as meeting the Rams seven times in the postseason, the Vikings have also met the Dallas Cowboys seven times, recording three wins and four losses.

Team	W	L	T	Win%	Points scored	Points allowed	W	L	Win%	Points scored	Points allowed
Team	Regular season						Playoffs				
Arizona	16	12	0	0.571	689	636	2	0	1.000	71	35
Atlanta	20	11	0	0.645	739	541	1	1	0.500	57	54
Baltimore	3	4	0	0.429	178	187	0	0	—	—	—
Buffalo	9	6	0	0.600	353	279	0	0	—	—	—
Carolina	11	6	0	0.647	343	353	0	0	—	—	—
Chicago	66	57	2	0.536	2,620	2,399	0	1	0.000	18	35
Cincinnati	7	8	0	0.467	335	297	0	0	—	—	—
Cleveland	11	5	0	0.688	417	254	1	0	1.000	27	7
Dallas	12	15	0	0.444	624	647	3	4	0.429	135	123
Denver	8	8	0	0.500	352	360	0	0	—	—	—
Detroit	80	43	2	0.648	2,757	2,373	0	0	—	—	—
Green Bay	58	65	3	0.472	2,479	2,802	1	1	0.500	41	41
Houston	6	0	0	1.000	181	98	0	0	—	—	—
Indianapolis	8	17	1	0.327	538	683	0	1	0.000	14	24
Jacksonville	6	1	0	0.857	188	134	0	0	—	—	—
Kansas City	5	8	0	0.385	284	239	0	1	0.000	7	23
Las Vegas	7	9	0	0.438	317	349	0	1	0.000	14	32
LA Chargers	8	7	0	0.533	369	358	0	0	—	—	—
LA Rams	22	16	2	0.575	922	888	5	2	0.714	150	150
Miami	6	7	0	0.462	277	263	0	1	0.000	7	24
New England	5	9	0	0.357	287	310	0	0	—	—	—
New Orleans	21	12	0	0.636	840	657	4	1	0.800	161	101
NY Giants	18	10	0	0.643	685	499	1	3	0.250	57	111
NY Jets	5	8	0	0.385	259	306	0	0	—	—	—
Philadelphia	15	12	0	0.556	639	627	0	4	0.000	51	122
Pittsburgh	10	8	0	0.556	425	364	0	1	0.000	6	16
San Francisco	24	20	1	0.544	1000	1009	1	5	0.167	104	181
Seattle	6	12	0	0.333	417	476	0	1	0.000	9	10
Tampa Bay	33	24	0	0.600	1,214	1,046	0	0	—	—	—
Tennessee	9	5	0	0.643	375	235	0	0	—	—	—
Washington	13	10	0	0.565	577	507	2	3	0.400	86	102
Totals	528	435	11	0.547	21,680	19,982	21	31	0.404	1,015	1,191

Last updated: As of end of week 6 of the 2024 NFL season

== Team records ==
=== Firsts ===
- First home game: Chicago Bears 13–37 Minnesota Vikings, September 17, 1961
- First road game: Minnesota Vikings 7–21 Dallas Cowboys, September 24, 1961
- First postseason game: Minnesota Vikings 14–24 Baltimore Colts, Divisional Round, December 22, 1968
- First postseason win: Los Angeles Rams 20–23 Minnesota Vikings, Divisional Round, December 27, 1969
- First Super Bowl: Minnesota Vikings 7–23 Kansas City Chiefs, Super Bowl IV, January 11, 1970
- First game at the Hubert H. Humphrey Metrodome: Seattle Seahawks 3–7 Minnesota Vikings, August 21, 1982
- First regular season game at the Metrodome: Tampa Bay Buccaneers 10–17 Minnesota Vikings, September 12, 1982
- First game at U.S. Bank Stadium: San Diego Chargers 10–23 Minnesota Vikings, August 28, 2016
- First regular season game at U.S. Bank Stadium: Green Bay Packers 14–17 Minnesota Vikings, September 18, 2016

=== Biggest results ===
- Largest margin of victory (home): 48, Cleveland Browns 3–51 Minnesota Vikings, November 9, 1969
- Largest margin of victory (road): 40, Minnesota Vikings 43–3 Dallas Cowboys, November 13, 1988
- Largest margin of defeat (home): 37, Dallas Cowboys 40–3 Minnesota Vikings, November 20, 2022
- Largest margin of defeat (road): 44, Minnesota Vikings 7–51 San Francisco 49ers, December 8, 1984
- Biggest comeback: 33, Minnesota Vikings 39–36 Indianapolis Colts, December 17, 2022 (league record)
- Most points scored in a game: 54, Dallas Cowboys 13–54 Minnesota Vikings, October 18, 1970
- Most points allowed in a game: 56, St. Louis Cardinals 56–14 Minnesota Vikings, October 6, 1963

=== Wins/losses in a season ===
- Most games won in a season (regular season): 15, 1998
- Most games won in a season (including postseason): 16, 1998
- Most games lost in a season: 13
  - 1984
  - 2011

=== Streaks ===
- Most consecutive games won (regular season): 13, 1974–1975
- Most consecutive games won (including postseason): 12, 1969
- Most consecutive home games won: 15, 1974–1976
- Most consecutive road games won: 7
  - 1970–1971
  - 1973–1974
- Most consecutive games lost: 8, 2001–2002
- Most consecutive home games lost: 5
  - 1966–1967
  - 2011
- Most consecutive road games lost: 16, 2000–2002
- Most consecutive games scoring: 260, 1991–2007
- Most consecutive games with a touchdown: 97, 1995–2001
- Most consecutive games with a field goal: 31, 1968–1970

=== Points ===
- Most points scored in a season: 556, 1998
- Fewest points scored in a season: 187, 1982 (season reduced to 9 games)
- Fewest points scored in a 16-game season: 259, 1979
- Most points allowed in a season: 484, 1984
- Fewest points allowed in a season: 133, 1969
- Fewest points allowed in a 16-game season: 233, 1988
- Most points scored by both teams in a preseason game: 74, Vikings (57) Dallas Cowboys (17) (September 3, 1965)
- Most points scored by both teams in a game: 89, Vikings (41) at Chicago Bears (48) (October 19, 2008)
- Fewest points scored by both teams in a game: 3, Vikings (3) vs. Green Bay Packers (0) (November 14, 1971); Vikings (3) at Las Vegas Raiders (0) (December 10, 2023)
- Most points scored in a first quarter: 28, vs. Green Bay Packers (September 28, 1986); vs. Arizona Cardinals (October 9, 2011)
- Most points scored in a second quarter: 28, vs. San Francisco 49ers (September 29, 1963); vs. Atlanta Falcons (September 14, 1968); vs. San Diego Chargers (November 28, 1999); vs. Detroit Lions (December 2, 2007)
- Most points scored in a third quarter: 24, at Pittsburgh Steelers (September 24, 1995)
- Most points scored in a fourth quarter: 28, at Philadelphia Eagles (December 1, 1985)
- Most points scored in a first half: 35, vs. Green Bay Packers (September 28, 1986); vs. Detroit Lions (December 2, 2007)
- Most points scored in a second half: 38, vs. Jacksonville Jaguars (December 20, 1998)
- Most points allowed in a first quarter: 21, 6 times
  - at Oakland Raiders (December 11, 1977)
  - at Oakland Raiders (December 17, 1978)
  - at Denver Broncos (November 18, 1984)
  - at Cincinnati Bengals (November 23, 1986)
  - at San Francisco 49ers (December 18, 1995)
  - at Detroit Lions (December 11, 2011)
- Most points allowed in a second quarter: 31, at Seattle Seahawks (September 29, 2002)
- Most points allowed in a third quarter: 24, at Chicago Bears (December 17, 1961); at Chicago Bears (September 19, 1985)
- Most points allowed in a fourth quarter: 28, at Baltimore Colts (December 16, 1962); vs. St. Louis Cardinals (October 6, 1963); vs. Green Bay Packers (November 21, 1965); at Chicago Bears (September 17, 1989)
- Most points allowed in a first half: 45, at Seattle Seahawks (September 29, 2002)
- Most points allowed in a second half: 35, at Baltimore Colts (December 16, 1962); vs. St. Louis Cardinals (October 6, 1963)
- Most points scored by both teams in a first quarter: 31, Vikings (10) at Cincinnati Bengals (21) (November 23, 1986)
- Most points scored by both teams in a second quarter: 38, Vikings (21) vs. Green Bay Packers (17) (December 24, 2004)
- Most points scored by both teams in a third quarter: 31, Vikings (7) at Chicago Bears (24) (December 17, 1961); Vikings (7) at Chicago Bears (24) (September 19, 1985)
- Most points scored by both teams in a fourth quarter: 42, Vikings (20) at Baltimore Ravens (22) (December 8, 2013)
- Most points scored by both teams in a first half: 55, Vikings (10) at Seattle Seahawks (45) (September 29, 2002)
- Most points scored by both teams in a second half: 56, Vikings (35) at Los Angeles Rams (14) (November 19, 1972)
- Fewest points scored by both teams in a first half: 0, 8 times
  - Vikings vs. Chicago Bears (October 7, 1962)
  - Vikings at Baltimore Colts (November 15, 1964)
  - Vikings at Chicago Bears (December 19, 1965)
  - Vikings vs. Green Bay Packers (November 14, 1971)
  - Vikings at Detroit Lions (September 26, 1976)
  - Vikings at Green Bay Packers (October 26, 1980)
  - Vikings at Tampa Bay Buccaneers (October 26, 1997)
  - Vikings at Las Vegas Raiders (December 10, 2023)
- Most points scored by both teams in a postseason game: 86, Vikings (37) at St. Louis Rams (49) (January 16, 2000)
- Fewest points scored by both teams in a postseason game: 19, Vikings (9) vs. Seattle Seahawks (10) (January 10, 2016)
- Most points scored in a first quarter postseason: 17, at Green Bay Packers (January 9, 2005)
- Most points scored in a second quarter postseason: 21, at New Orleans Saints (January 3, 1988)
- Most points scored in a third quarter postseason: 16, vs. St. Louis Cardinals (December 21, 1974)
- Most points scored in a fourth quarter postseason: 20, Vikings at St. Louis Rams (January 16, 2000)
- Most points scored in a first half postseason: 31, at New Orleans Saints (January 3, 1988)
- Most points scored in a second half postseason: 23, vs. St. Louis Cardinals (December 21, 1974)
- Most points allowed in a first quarter postseason: 14, 5 times
  - at Miami Dolphins (January 13, 1974)
  - at Washington Redskins (January 15, 1983)
  - at St. Louis Rams (January 16, 2000)
  - at New York Giants (January 14, 2001)
  - vs. New York Giants (January 15, 2023)
- Most points allowed in a second quarter postseason: 23, at Dallas Cowboys (December 28, 1996)
- Most points allowed in a third quarter postseason: 21, at St. Louis Rams (January 16, 2000)
- Most points allowed in a fourth quarter postseason: 17, vs. New Orleans Saints (January 14, 2018)
- Most points allowed in a first half postseason: 34, at New York Giants (January 14, 2001)
- Most points allowed in a second half postseason: 35, at St. Louis Rams (January 16, 2000)
- Most points scored by both teams in a first quarter postseason: 21, Vikings (14) at New Orleans Saints (7) (January 24, 2010); Vikings (7) at New York Giants (14) (January 15, 2023)
- Most points scored by both teams in a second quarter postseason: 24, Vikings (21) at New Orleans Saints (3) (January 3, 1988); Vikings (17) vs. Arizona Cardinals (7) (January 10, 1999)
- Most points scored by both teams in a third quarter postseason: 24, Vikings (10) at San Francisco 49ers (14) (January 9, 1988)
- Most points scored by both teams in a fourth quarter postseason: 34, Vikings (20) at St. Louis Rams (14) (January 16, 2000)
- Most points scored by both teams in a first half postseason: 41, Vikings (31) at New Orleans Saints (10) (January 3, 1988)
- Most points scored by both teams in a second half postseason: 55, Vikings (20) at St. Louis Rams (35) (January 16, 2000)
- Fewest points scored by both teams in a first half postseason: 2, Vikings (0) vs. Pittsburgh Steelers (2) Super Bowl IX (January 12, 1975)
- Fewest points scored by both teams in a second half postseason: 0, Vikings at Washington Redskins (January 15, 1983)

=== Touchdowns ===
- Most touchdowns scored in a season: 64, 1998
- Fewest touchdowns scored in a season: 23, 1982 (season reduced to 9 games)
- Fewest touchdowns scored in a 16-game season: 28, 1993
- Most touchdowns allowed in a season: 59, 1984
- Fewest touchdowns allowed in a season: 14
  - 1970
  - 1971
- Most touchdowns scored in a game: 7
  - vs. Baltimore Colts, September 28, 1969
  - vs. Pittsburgh Steelers, November 23, 1969
  - at Tampa Bay Buccaneers, October 23, 1988
- Most touchdowns allowed in a game: 8, vs. St. Louis Cardinals, October 6, 1963
- Most touchdowns by both teams in a game: 12, Vikings (5) at Chicago Bears (7), December 17, 1961
- Fewest touchdowns by both teams in a game: 0, 6 times
  - at Las Vegas Raiders, December 10, 2023
  - at San Francisco 49ers, November 5, 2006
  - at Pittsburgh Steelers, December 20, 1992
  - vs. Indianapolis Colts, November 20, 1988
  - vs. Green Bay Packers, September 30, 1973
  - vs. Green Bay Packers, November 14, 1971

=== Field goals ===
- Most field goals made in a season: 35
  - 1998 (Gary Anderson)
  - 2012 (Blair Walsh)
- Most field goals made by opponents in a season: 34, 2006
- Fewest field goals made in a season: 8
  - 1977
  - 1982 (season reduced to 9 games)
- Most field goals made in a game: 7, vs. Los Angeles Rams, November 5, 1989
- Most field goals made by an opponent in a game: 6
  - vs. Detroit Lions, November 13, 1966
  - at Detroit Lions, October 17, 1999

=== Defensive ===
- Most sacks in a game: 10, November 4, 2018
- Most sacks allowed in a game: 11, October 28, 1984

=== Attendances ===
- Largest home attendance (regular season): 67,157, vs. Green Bay Packers, December 23, 2019
- Largest home attendance (postseason): 66,612, vs. New Orleans Saints, NFC Divisional Playoff Game, January 14, 2018
- Largest road attendance (regular season): 90,608, at Washington Redskins, September 11, 2006
- Largest road attendance (postseason): 103,438, vs. Oakland Raiders, Super Bowl XI, Rose Bowl, Pasadena, January 9, 1977
- Largest total home attendance in a season: 534,804, 2019 (8 games)
- Smallest home attendance (regular season): 0, vs. Green Bay Packers, September 13, 2020, Tennessee Titans, September 27, 2020, Atlanta Falcons, October 18, 2020, Detroit Lions, November 8, 2020, Dallas Cowboys, November 22, 2020, Carolina Panthers, November 29, 2020, Jacksonville Jaguars, December 6, 2020, and Chicago Bears, December 20, 2020.
  - Restricted fan attendance due to COVID-19 pandemic.
- Smallest home attendance without restrictions (regular season): 13,911, vs. Green Bay Packers, October 4, 1987
- Smallest home attendance (postseason): 44,626, vs. St. Louis Cardinals, Divisional Round, December 21, 1974
- Smallest home attendance at the Metrodome (postseason): 57,353, vs. Washington Redskins, Wildcard Round, January 2, 1993
- Smallest road attendance (regular season): 0, at Seattle Seahawks, October 11, 2020, at Green Bay Packers, November 1, 2020, and at Chicago Bears, November 16, 2020.
  - Restricted fan attendance due to COVID-19 pandemic.
- Smallest road attendance without restrictions (regular season): 12,992, at Dallas Cowboys, September 24, 1961
- Smallest road attendance (postseason): 54,593, at Washington Redskins, Divisional Round, January 15, 1983

== Individual records ==
Note: Bold indicates the record is still active as of the 2025 NFL season.

=== Most career passing yards ===
Rank	Player	Total yards
1	Fran Tarkenton	33,098
2	Tommy Kramer	24,775
3	Kirk Cousins	23,265
4	Daunte Culpepper	20,162
5	Wade Wilson	12,135
6	Brad Johnson	11,098
7	Warren Moon	10,102
8	Brett Favre	6,711
9	Christian Ponder	6,658
10	Rich Gannon	6,457

=== Most career passing touchdowns ===
Rank	Player	Touchdowns
1	Fran Tarkenton	239
2	Kirk Cousins	171
3	Tommy Kramer	159
4	Daunte Culpepper	135
5	Wade Wilson	66
6	Brad Johnson	65
7	Warren Moon	58
8	Randall Cunningham	48
9	Brett Favre	44
10	Rich Gannon	40

=== Most career rushing yards ===
Rank	Player	Total yards
1	Adrian Peterson	11,747
2	Robert Smith	6,818
3	Dalvin Cook	5,993
4	Chuck Foreman	5,879
5	Bill Brown	5,757
6	Ted Brown	4,546
7	Dave Osborn	4,320
8	Darrin Nelson	4,231
9	Tommy Mason	3,252
10	Michael Bennett	3,174

=== Most career rushing touchdowns ===
Rank	Player	Touchdowns
1	Adrian Peterson	97
2	Chuck Foreman	52
2	Bill Brown	52
4	Dalvin Cook	47
5	Ted Brown	40
6	Robert Smith	32
7	Daunte Culpepper	29
7	Dave Osborn	29
9	Tommy Mason	28
10	Leroy Hoard	26

=== Most career receiving yards ===
Rank	Player	Total yards
1	Cris Carter	12,383
2	Randy Moss	9,316
3	**Justin Jefferson**	**8,627**
4	Anthony Carter	7,635
5	Adam Thielen	6,682
6	Jake Reed	6,433
7	Sammy White	6,400
8	Steve Jordan	6,307
9	Ahmad Rashad	5,489
10	Stefon Diggs	4,623

=== Most career receiving touchdowns ===
Rank	Player	Touchdowns
1	Cris Carter	110
2	Randy Moss	92
3	Adam Thielen	55
4	Anthony Carter	52
5	Sammy White	50
6	Kyle Rudolph	48
7	**Justin Jefferson**	**42**
8	Ahmad Rashad	34
8	Jake Reed	33
10	Stefon Diggs	30

=== Most career points ===
Rank	Player	Points
1	Fred Cox	1,365
2	Cris Carter	670
3	Ryan Longwell	633
4	Adrian Peterson	614
5	Fuad Reveiz	598
6	Randy Moss	564
7	Blair Walsh	555
8	Gary Anderson	542
9	Bill Brown	456
10	Chuck Foreman	450

=== Most career interceptions ===
Rank	Player	Interceptions
1	Paul Krause	53
2	Bobby Bryant	51
3	Ed Sharockman	40
4	**Harrison Smith**	**39**
5	Joey Browner	37
6	Nate Wright	31
7	Carl Lee	29
8	John Turner	22
8	Orlando Thomas	22
10	Antoine Winfield	21

=== Most career sacks ===
Rank	Player	Sacks
1	Carl Eller	130
2	Jim Marshall	127
3	John Randle	114
4	Alan Page	108
5	Chris Doleman	96.5
6	Danielle Hunter	87.5
7	Jared Allen	85.5
8	Everson Griffen	79.5
9	Brian Robison	60
9	Kevin Williams	60
*Sacks were not official until 1982

=== Most career tackles ===
Rank	Player	Tackles
1	Scott Studwell	1,981
2	Matt Blair	1,452
3	Jeff Siemon	1,382
4	Chad Greenway	1,350
5	Alan Page	1,120
*Tackles were not official until 2001. *Totals are defensive and special teams.

=== Scoring ===
- Most touchdowns in a season: **41**, Daunte Culpepper (2004)
- Most touchdowns in a season (non-QB): **22**, Chuck Foreman (1975)
- Most touchdowns in a game: **4**, Dalvin Cook at Green Bay Packers (November 1, 2020); Ahmad Rashad vs. San Francisco 49ers (September 2, 1979); Chuck Foreman at Buffalo Bills (December 20, 1975)
- Most touchdowns in one half: **4**, Ahmad Rashad vs. San Francisco 49ers (September 2, 1979) (2nd half)
- Most touchdowns in one quarter: **3**, Adrian Peterson vs. Arizona Cardinals (October 9, 2011) (1st quarter)
- Most rushing touchdowns in a season: **18**, Adrian Peterson (2009)
- Most rushing touchdowns in a rookie season: **12**, Adrian Peterson (2007)
- Most rushing touchdowns in a game: **3**, 19 times
  - Tommy Mason at San Francisco 49ers (October 24, 1965)
  - Clinton Jones vs. Detroit Lions (November 15, 1970)
  - Chuck Foreman at Green Bay Packers (September 15, 1974); vs. San Diego Chargers (November 23, 1975)
  - D. J. Dozier vs. Denver Broncos (October 26, 1987)
  - Herschel Walker at Phoenix Cardinals (October 27, 1991)
  - Daunte Culpepper vs. Chicago Bears (September 3, 2000)
  - Onterrio Smith vs. Kansas City Chiefs (December 20, 2003)
  - Artose Pinner at Detroit Lions (December 10, 2006)
  - Adrian Peterson at Chicago Bears (October 14, 2007); vs. San Diego Chargers (November 4, 2007); at Cleveland Browns (September 13, 2009); vs. Buffalo Bills (December 5, 2010); vs. Arizona Cardinals (October 9, 2011)
  - Chester Taylor vs. Oakland Raiders (November 18, 2007)
  - Matt Asiata vs. Philadelphia Eagles (December 15, 2013); vs. Atlanta Falcons (September 28, 2014); vs. Washington Redskins (November 2, 2014)
  - Dalvin Cook at Green Bay Packers (November 1, 2020)
- Most rushing touchdowns in one half: **3**, 5 times
  - Herschel Walker at Phoenix Cardinals (October 27, 1991) (2nd half)
  - Daunte Culpepper vs. Chicago Bears (September 3, 2000) (2nd half)
  - Onterrio Smith vs. Kansas City Chiefs (December 20, 2003) (2nd half)
  - Adrian Peterson vs. Arizona Cardinals (October 9, 2011) (1st half)
  - Matt Asiata vs. Washington Redskins (November 2, 2014) (2nd half)
- Most rushing touchdowns in one quarter: **3**, Adrian Peterson vs. Arizona Cardinals (October 9, 2011) (1st quarter)
- Most consecutive games with a rushing TD: **7**
  - Moe Williams (2002)
  - Dalvin Cook (2020)
- Most passing touchdowns in a season: **39**, Daunte Culpepper (2004)
- Most passing touchdowns in a rookie season: **18**, Fran Tarkenton (1961)
- Most passing touchdowns in a game: **7**, Joe Kapp vs Baltimore Colts (September 28, 1969) – **NFL record**
- Most passing touchdowns in one half: **5**, Tommy Kramer vs Green Bay Packers (September 28, 1986) (1st half)
- Most passing touchdowns in one quarter: **4**, Tommy Kramer vs Green Bay Packers (September 28, 1986) (1st quarter)
- Most consecutive games with a passing TD: **39**, Kirk Cousins (2020–2022)
- Most receiving touchdowns in a season: **17**
  - Cris Carter (1995)
  - Randy Moss (twice: 1998, 2003)
- Most receiving touchdowns in a rookie season: **17**, Randy Moss (1998)
- Most receiving touchdowns in a game: **4**, Ahmad Rashad vs. San Francisco 49ers (September 2, 1979)
- Most receiving touchdowns in one half: **4**, Ahmad Rashad vs. San Francisco 49ers (September 2, 1979) (2nd half)
- Most consecutive games with a receiving TD: **10**, Randy Moss (2003–2004)
- Most points scored in a season: **164**, Gary Anderson (1998)
- Most points scored in a rookie season: **141**, Blair Walsh (2012)
- Most field goal scored in a game: **7**, Rich Karlis vs. Los Angeles Rams (November 5, 1989)
- Most field goal scored in one half: **5**, Rich Karlis vs. Cincinnati Bengals (December 25, 1989) (1st half)
- Most field goal scored in one quarter: **3**, 14 times
  - Blair Walsh vs. Jacksonville Jaguars (September 9, 2012) (4th quarter); at Washington Redskins (October 14, 2012) (1st quarter); at St. Louis Rams (December 16, 2012) (2nd quarter)
  - Ryan Longwell vs. Cincinnati Bengals (December 13, 2009) (2nd quarter)
  - Paul Edinger vs. New Orleans Saints (September 25, 2005) (4th quarter)
  - Gary Anderson at Chicago Bears (October 10, 1999) (2nd quarter)
  - Fuad Reveiz at Tampa Bay Buccaneers (November 27, 1994) (2nd quarter); vs. New Orleans Saints (November 19, 1995) (2nd quarter)
  - Rich Karlis vs. Los Angeles Rams (November 5, 1989) (2nd quarter); vs. Cincinnati Bengals (December 25, 1989) (2nd quarter)
  - Jan Stenerud at Detroit Lions (September 23, 1984) (2nd quarter)
  - Rick Danmeier at Washington Redskins (November 2, 1980) (4th quarter)
  - Fred Cox at Green Bay Packers (December 5, 1965) (2nd quarter); at Chicago Bears (September 23, 1973) (4th quarter)

=== Rushing ===
- Most rushing attempts in a career: **2,418**, Adrian Peterson (2007–2016)
- Most rushing attempts in a season: **363**, Adrian Peterson (2008)
- Most rushing attempts in a rookie season: **238**, Adrian Peterson (2007)
- Most rushing attempts in a game: **35**, Adrian Peterson (December 1, 2013)
- Most consecutive attempts without a fumble: **478**, Robert Smith (1996–1998)
- Most rushing yards in a season: **2,097**, Adrian Peterson (2012)
- Most rushing yards in a rookie season: **1,341**, Adrian Peterson (2007)
- Most rushing yards in a game: **296**, Adrian Peterson (November 4, 2007) – **NFL record**
- Longest run: **95**, Chester Taylor (October 22, 2006)
- Most seasons with 1,000+ yards rushing: **7**, Adrian Peterson (2007–2010, 2012–2013, 2015)
- Most consecutive seasons with 1,000+ yards rushing: **4**
  - Robert Smith (1997–2000)
  - Adrian Peterson (2007–2010)
  - Dalvin Cook (2019-2022)
- Most games with 100+ yards rushing: **49**, Adrian Peterson (2007–2016)
- Most games with 200+ yards rushing: **6**, Adrian Peterson (2007–2016)
- Most consecutive games with 100+ yards rushing: **8**, Adrian Peterson (October 21, 2012–December 16, 2012)
- Most games with 100+ yards rushing in a season: **10**, Adrian Peterson (twice: 2008, 2012)

=== Passing ===
- Most passing attempts in a career: **4,569**, Fran Tarkenton (1961–1966, 1972–1978)
- Most passing attempts in a season: **643**, Kirk Cousins (2022)
- Most passing attempts in a rookie season: **402**, Teddy Bridgewater (2014)
- Most passing attempts in a game: **63**, Rich Gannon (October 20, 1991)
- Most completions in a career: **2,635**, Fran Tarkenton (1961–1966, 1972–1978)
- Most completions in a season: **425**, Kirk Cousins (2018)
- Most completions in a rookie season: **259**, Teddy Bridgewater (2014)
- Most completions in a game: **45**, Kirk Cousins (2018)
- Most consecutive completions: **17**, Kirk Cousins (October 9, 2022)
- Most passing yards in a season: **4,717**, Daunte Culpepper (2004)
- Most passing yards in a rookie season: **2,919**, Teddy Bridgewater (2014)
- Most passing yards in a game: **490**, Tommy Kramer (November 2, 1986 OT)
- Longest pass completion: **99 yards**, Gus Frerotte (to Bernard Berrian) (November 30, 2008)
- Longest pass completion by a rookie: **87 yards**, Teddy Bridgewater (December 7, 2014)
- Most seasons with 3,000+ yards passing: **5**, Tommy Kramer (1979–1981, 1985–1986)
- Most games with 300+ yards passing: **27**, **Kirk Cousins (2018–present)**
- Most consecutive games with 300+ yards passing: **4**, Daunte Culpepper (September 20, 2004–October 17, 2004)
- Most consecutive attempts without an interception: **193**, Warren Moon (1995)

=== Receiving ===
- Most receptions in a career: **1,004**, Cris Carter (1990–2001)
- Most receptions in a season: **128**, Justin Jefferson (2022)
- Most receptions in a rookie season: **88**, Justin Jefferson (2020)
- Most receptions in a game: **15**, Rickey Young (December 16, 1979)
- Most consecutive games with a reception: **111**, Cris Carter (1991–1998)
- Most seasons with 50+ receptions: **11**, Cris Carter (1991–2001)
- Most receiving yards in a season: **1,809**, Justin Jefferson (2022)
- Most receiving yards in a rookie season: **1,400**, Justin Jefferson (2020)
- Most receiving yards in a game: **223**, Justin Jefferson ( December 11, 2022)
- Longest reception: **99 yards**, Bernard Berrian (from Gus Frerotte) (November 30, 2008)
- Most seasons with 1,000+ yards receiving: **8**, Cris Carter (1993–2000)
- Most games with 100+ yards receiving in a career: **41**, Randy Moss (1998–2004)
- Most games with 100+ yards receiving in a season: **10**, Justin Jefferson (2022)
- Most consecutive games with 100+ yards receiving: **8**, Adam Thielen (2018) – **NFL record**

=== Defense ===
- Most tackles in a season: **230**, Scott Studwell (1981)
- Most tackles in a game: **24**, Scott Studwell (November 17, 1985)
- Most sacks in a season: **22**, Jared Allen (2011)
- Most sacks in a game: **5.0**, Randy Holloway (September 16, 1984)
- Most consecutive games with a sack: **11**, Jared Allen (December 28, 2010 – November 14, 2011)
- Most fumble recoveries in a career: **29**, Jim Marshall (1961–1979)
- Most fumble recoveries in a season: **9**, Don Hultz (1963) – **NFL record**
- Most fumble recoveries in a game: **3**, Joey Browner (September 8, 1985)
- Longest fumble recovery: **94**, Dwayne Rudd (December 6, 1998)
- Most interceptions in a season: **10**, Paul Krause (1975)
- Most interceptions in a rookie season: **9**, Orlando Thomas (1995)
- Most consecutive games with an interception: **6**
  - Paul Krause (1968)
  - Brian Russell (2003)
- Longest interception return: **100**, Xavier Rhodes (November 20, 2016)

=== Special teams ===
- Most punts in a career: **720**, Greg Coleman (1978–1987)
- Most punts in a season: **93**, Chris Kluwe (2006)
- Most punts in a rookie season: **75**, Jeff Locke (2013)
- Most punts in a game: **12**, Greg Coleman (November 21, 1982)
- Most punts in a game by an opponent: **12**, Tom Blanchard (New Orleans Saints – November 21, 1982)
- Longest punt: **84 yards** Harry Newsome (December 20, 1992)
- Longest average gross punt in a career (200 punts minimum): **44.4**, Chris Kluwe (2005–2012)
- Longest average net punt in a career (200 punts minimum): **38.8**, Jeff Locke (2013–2016)
- Most punts inside the 20 in a career: **198**, Chris Kluwe (2005–2011)
- Most punt returns in a career: **237**, Marcus Sherels (2011–2019)
- Most punt returns in a season: **58**, Leo Lewis (1988)
- Most punt returns in a rookie season: **48**, Kevin Miller (1978)
- Most punt returns in a game: **8**, Kevin Miller (December 2, 1979)
- Most punt return yards in a career: **2,480**, Marcus Sherels (2011–2019)
- Most punt return yards in a season: **550**, Leo Lewis (1988)
- Most punt return yards in a rookie season: **247**, Keenan Howry (2003)
- Most punt return yards in a game: **119**, Marcus Sherels (October 21, 2013)
- Longest punt return: **98 yards**, Charlie West (November 3, 1968)
- Longest average punt return in a career (minimum 50): **10.46**, Marcus Sherels (2011–2019)
- Most punt return touchdowns in a career: **5**, Marcus Sherels (2011–2019)
- Most kickoff returns in a career: **159**, Darrin Nelson (1982–1989, 1991–1992)
- Most kickoff returns in a season: **53**
  - Eddie Payton (1980)
  - Buster Rhymes (1985)
- Most kickoff returns in a rookie season: **53**, Buster Rhymes (1985)
- Most kickoff returns in a game: **9**, Nate Jacquet (November 11, 2001)
- Most kickoff return yards in a career: **4,075**, Cordarrelle Patterson (2013–2016)
- Most kickoff return yards in a season: **1,393**, Cordarrelle Patterson (2013)
- Most kickoff return yards in a rookie season: **1,393**, Cordarrelle Patterson (2013)
- Most kickoff return yards in a game: **237 yards**, Nate Jacquet (November 11, 2001)
- Longest kickoff return: **109 yards**, Cordarrelle Patterson (October 27, 2013) – **NFL record**
- Longest average kickoff return in a season (minimum 20): **32.4**, Cordarrelle Patterson (2013)
- Longest average kickoff return in a career (minimum 75): **30.4**, Cordarrelle Patterson (2013–2016)
- Most kickoff return touchdowns in a career: **5**, Percy Harvin (2009–2012) and Cordarrelle Patterson (2013–2016)
