= 1983 Minnesota Vikings season =

NFL team season

- General manager: Mike Lynn
- Head coach: Bud Grant
- Home stadium: Hubert H. Humphrey Metrodome

Results
- Record: 8–8
- Division place: 4th NFC Central
- Playoffs: Did not qualify

Uniform
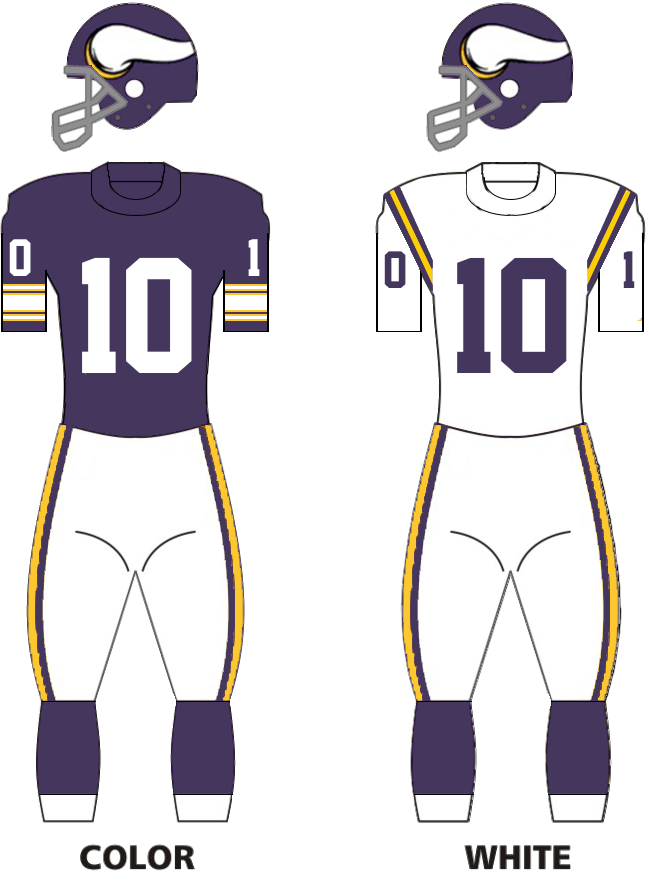

The 1983 season was the Minnesota Vikings' 23rd in the National Football League (NFL), and their 17th under head coach Bud Grant. After starting 6–2, the Vikings lost six of their next seven – including a home loss to the 0–9 Tampa Bay Buccaneers – and were eliminated from playoff contention with one week to play.

Even with the loss to Tampa Bay, Minnesota would have won the NFC Central Division championship if not for a 13–2 loss to the Detroit Lions on Monday Night Football in week 14.

The team finished 8–8 record and failed to reach the playoffs for the third time in five seasons. At the end of the season, Grant retired as head coach, although he returned for a final season in 1985.

== Offseason ==
=== 1983 draft ===
Pro Bowler

1983 Minnesota Vikings Draft
Draft order		Player name	Position	College	Notes
Round	Selection	Player name	Position	College	Notes
1	19	Joey Browner	Cornerback	USC	
2	46	Traded to the Philadelphia Eagles (Note: The Vikings traded a second-round selection (46th overall) to the Philadelphia Eagles in exchange for DT Charlie Johnson.)			
3	73	Walker Lee Ashley	Linebacker	Penn State	
4	100	Mark Rush	Running back	Miami (FL)	
5	127	Mark Stewart	Linebacker	Washington	
6	159	Mike Jones	Wide receiver	Tennessee State	
7	186	Carl Lee	Cornerback	Marshall	
8	213	Norris Brown	Tight end	Georgia	
9	239	Rod Achter	Wide receiver	Toledo	
10	255	Melvin Brown	Defensive back	Ole Miss	From Rams (Note: The Vikings traded OT Ron Yary to the Los Angeles Rams in exchange for a 10th-round selection (255th overall).)
10	266	Walter Tate	Center	Tennessee State	
11	298	Brian Butcher	Guard	Clemson	
12	325	Maurice Turner	Running back	Utah State	

== Roster ==
1983 Minnesota Vikings roster
Quarterbacks (QB): 12 Steve Dils; 11 Wade Wilson; Running backs (RB): 33 Rick Bell; 23 Ted Brown; 32 Tony Galbreath; 20 Darrin Nelson; 22 Jarvis Redwine; 34 Rickey Young; Wide receivers (WR): 89 Mike Jones; 80 Terry LeCount; 87 Leo Lewis; 84 Sam McCullum; 88 Mardye McDole; 85 Sammy White; Tight ends (TE): 82 Bob Bruer; 44 Dave Casper; 83 Steve Jordan; 81 Joe Senser	Offensive linemen (OL): 62 Brent Boyd G; 61 Wes Hamilton G; 51 Jim Hough G; 56 Dave Huffman C; 76 Tim Irwin T; 78 Steve Riley T; 68 Curtis Rouse T; 67 Dennis Swilley C; 66 Terry Tausch T; Defensive linemen (DL): 73 Neil Elshire DE; 75 Randy Holloway DE; 65 Charlie Johnson NT; 79 Doug Martin DE; 77 Mark Mullaney DE; 72 James White NT	Linebackers (LB): 58 Walker Lee Ashley ILB; 59 Matt Blair OLB; 50 Dennis Fowlkes ILB; 52 Dennis Johnson ILB; 54 Fred McNeill OLB; 57 Robin Sendlein OLB; 55 Scott Studwell ILB; Defensive backs (DB): 21 Rufus Bess CB; 47 Joey Browner FS; 45 Tommy Hannon SS; 39 Carl Lee CB; 29 John Swain CB; 37 Willie Teal CB; 27 John Turner FS; Special teams (ST): 8 Greg Coleman P; 1 Benny Ricardo K	Reserve: -- Melvin Brown CB (IR); 7 Rick Danmeier K (IR); 9 Tommy Kramer QB (IR); 4 Archie Manning QB (NF-Ill.); 86 Mike Mularkey TE (IR); 49 Keith Nord S (IR); -- Mark Stewart LB (IR); Rookies in italics Source

== Preseason ==
Week	Date	Opponent	Result	Record	Venue	Attendance	Notes
1	August 6	vs St. Louis Cardinals	W 28–10	1–0	Wembley Stadium (London, England)	32,847	Global Cup
2	August 13	Baltimore Colts	L 7–10	1–1	Hubert H. Humphrey Metrodome	56,061	
3	August 19	at Seattle Seahawks	W 19–17	2–1	Kingdome	54,402	
4	August 26	Denver Broncos	W 34–3	3–1	Hubert H. Humphrey Metrodome	59,435	

== Regular season ==
=== Schedule ===
Week	Date	Opponent	Result	Record	Venue	Attendance
1	September 4	at Cleveland Browns	W 27–21	1–0	Cleveland Stadium	70,087
2	September 8	San Francisco 49ers	L 17–48	1–1	Hubert H. Humphrey Metrodome	58,167
3	September 18	at Tampa Bay Buccaneers	W 19–16 (OT)	2–1	Tampa Stadium	57,567
4	September 25	Detroit Lions	W 20–17	3–1	Hubert H. Humphrey Metrodome	58,254
5	October 2	Dallas Cowboys	L 24–37	3–2	Hubert H. Humphrey Metrodome	60,774
6	October 9	at Chicago Bears	W 23–14	4–2	Soldier Field	59,632
7	October 16	Houston Oilers	W 34–14	5–2	Hubert H. Humphrey Metrodome	58,910
8	October 23	at Green Bay Packers	W 20–17 (OT)	6–2	Lambeau Field	55,236
9	October 30	at St. Louis Cardinals	L 31–41	6–3	Busch Memorial Stadium	42,575
10	November 6	Tampa Bay Buccaneers	L 12–17	6–4	Hubert H. Humphrey Metrodome	59,239
11	November 13	Green Bay Packers	L 21–29	6–5	Hubert H. Humphrey Metrodome	60,113
12	November 20	at Pittsburgh Steelers	W 17–14	7–5	Three Rivers Stadium	58,417
13	November 27	at New Orleans Saints	L 16–17	7–6	Louisiana Superdome	59,502
14	December 5	at Detroit Lions	L 2–13	7–7	Silverdome	79,169
15	December 11	Chicago Bears	L 13–19	7–8	Hubert H. Humphrey Metrodome	57,880
16	December 17	Cincinnati Bengals	W 20–14	8–8	Hubert H. Humphrey Metrodome	51,565

Against the Detroit Lions in week 14, the Vikings became the 35th team in NFL history and only the fifth since the 1970 NFL/AFL merger, to score just a safety in a game. This has happened only three times since: by the 1993 Cincinnati Bengals, the 2011 Atlanta Falcons, and the 2013 Jacksonville Jaguars.

=== Standings ===
NFC Central
	W	L	T	PCT	DIV	CONF	PF	PA	STK
Detroit Lions^{(3)}	9	7	0	.563	7–1	8–4	347	286	W1
Green Bay Packers	8	8	0	.500	4–4	6–6	429	439	L1
Chicago Bears	8	8	0	.500	4–4	7–7	311	301	W2
Minnesota Vikings	8	8	0	.500	4–4	4–8	316	348	W1
Tampa Bay Buccaneers	2	14	0	.125	1–7	1–11	241	380	L3

== Statistics ==
=== Team leaders ===
Category	Player(s)	Value
Passing yards	Steve Dils	2,840
Passing touchdowns	Steve Dils	911
Rushing yards	Darrin Nelson	642
Rushing touchdowns	Ted Brown	10
Receiving yards	Darrin Nelson	618
Receiving touchdowns	Sammy White	4
Points	Benny Ricardo	108
Kickoff return yards	Jarvis Redwine	838
Punt return yards	Rufus Bess	158
Sacks	Doug Martin	13
Interceptions	John Swain; John Turner	6

=== League rankings ===
Category	Total yards	Yards per game	NFL rank (out of 28)
Passing offense	3,211	200.7	13th
Rushing offense	1,808	113.0	20th
Total offense	5,019	313.7	20th
Passing defense	2,903	181.4	6th
Rushing defense	2,584	161.5	25th
Total defense	5,487	342.9	19th
