= Tommy Kramer =

American football player (born 1955)

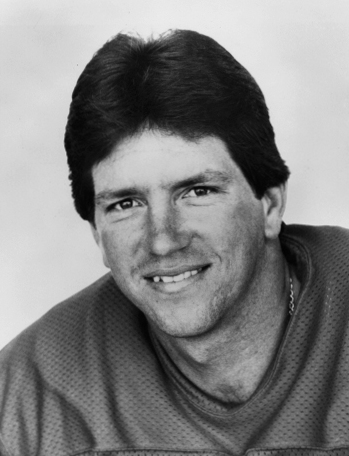
- Kramer in 1980s

No. 9
- Position: Quarterback

Personal information
- Born: March 7, 1955 (age 71); San Antonio, Texas, U.S.
- Listed height: 6 ft 2 in (1.88 m)
- Listed weight: 200 lb (91 kg)

Career information
- High school: Robert E. Lee (San Antonio)
- College: Rice (1973–1976)
- NFL draft: 1977: 1st round, 27th overall pick

Career history
- Minnesota Vikings (1977–1989); New Orleans Saints (1990)

Awards and highlights
- NFL Co-Comeback Player of the Year (1986); Second-team All-Pro (1986); Pro Bowl (1986); NFL passer rating leader (1986); PFWA All-Rookie Team (1977); 50 Greatest Vikings; Sammy Baugh Trophy (1976); Consensus All-American (1976); SWC Player of the Year (1976); Second-team All-SWC (1976)

Career NFL statistics
- Passing attempts: 3,651
- Passing completions: 2,012
- Completion percentage: 55.1%
- Passing yards: 24,777
- TD–INT: 159–158
- Passer rating: 72.8
- Stats at Pro Football Reference
- College Football Hall of Fame

Thomas Francis Kramer (born March 7, 1955) is an American former professional football player who was a quarterback in the National Football League (NFL) from 1977 to 1990. He played college football for the Rice Owls and was selected by the Minnesota Vikings in the first round (27th overall) of the 1977 NFL draft after being named MVP of the 1977 Senior Bowl. He was inducted with the 2012 class into the College Football Hall of Fame.

== Early life ==
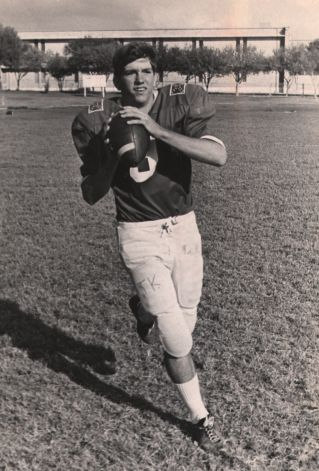
Kramer at San Antonio Lee High School

Kramer played his high school football at Robert E. Lee High School in San Antonio. He guided the Volunteers to a state title in 1971 and then to the state semi-finals in 1972. The state championship game in 1971 was the first high school game played in the new Texas Stadium (Dallas Cowboys) in Irving, Texas. Kramer guided the Lee Volunteers to a 28–27 victory which has been hailed by some as the best high school game ever played in Texas. Kramer's high school teammates included Pat Rockett (played major league baseball for the Atlanta Braves), and Richard Osborne (played for the NFL's Philadelphia Eagles).

The Volunteers went 27–1–1 during Kramer's two years on the varsity, beating Wichita Falls High School 28–27 for the Class 4A state title in 1971 and losing to Baytown Sterling 21–20 in the 1972 state semifinals. Guided by head coach John Ferrara, the 1971 team finished 14–0–1 – a 7–7 tie with rival Churchill kept the Volunteers from being perfect – and the 1972 squad went 13–1. In an era when most Texas high school football teams churned out yardage with ground-oriented offenses such as the wishbone or the veer, Lee achieved success by throwing the ball.

Kramer passed for 2,588 yards as a senior, then a state record, and completed 149 of 294 passes for 28 touchdowns. In two seasons, he completed 327 of 597 attempts for 5,489 yards and 54 TDs. Surrounded by sure-handed receivers including Osborne, Rockett, and Gary Haack, Kramer was a master at picking apart defenses with his deft passing. Kramer started all but one game as a varsity player, going 26–1–1. He made his debut in the 1971 season opener, replacing starter Bruce Trimmier and rallying Lee to a 7–3 victory over Alamo Heights on a rainy night. It is here that he acquired the nickname "Two-Minute Tommy", which stuck on for the rest of his football career.

== College career ==
After his strong career at Lee, Kramer became another of the many players from San Antonio to play college football at Rice University.

Kramer led the Owls in passing for four straight years and his career and season marks were the standard at Rice for over 30 years until they were shattered by Chase Clement, another San Antonio signal caller. Kramer left Rice with school records in single-season passing yards, career passing yards (6,197); season total offense (3,272), career total offense (6,336), season touchdown passes (21), career touchdown passes (37), season total touchdowns (25) and career total touchdowns (48). He was the 1976 George Martin Award winner as Rice's MVP in 1976 and was elected to the Rice Athletic Hall of Fame in 1984.

Kramer played in the Senior Bowl and the Blue-Gray Game in 1976 and was named MVP of the Senior Bowl. He also received the Fort Worth Kiwanis Sportsmanship Award in 1976.

In 2012, Kramer was inducted into the College Football Hall of Fame.

== Professional career ==
Kramer appeared in five games of his rookie season in 1977, with one start and four mop-up roles as the heir apparent to Fran Tarkenton, although when Tarkenton was hurt late in the season, Bob Lee would be the starter for four of the last five games. In the 12th game of the year, Minnesota trailed the San Francisco 49ers 24–7 in the fourth quarter, and Kramer was brought in to replace Lee. He went 9-of-13 for 188 yards and three touchdowns to win 28–27, becoming the youngest Vikings quarterback to do so until the 2025 season (J J. McCarthy). The following week, he made his first ever start against the Oakland Raiders. He went 16-of-34 for 177 yards with a touchdown and three interceptions in the 35–13 loss. The following year, Kramer would end up in mop-up duty as Tarkenton started each game for his final season. For the 1979 season, Kramer would become fully installed as the starter.

He earned the nickname "Two-Minute Tommy" for his reputation with comebacks, as he would lead the Vikings to nineteen comebacks (and one in the playoffs), with fifteen in the fourth quarter, with 1980 and 1985 having four from Kramer in each year. However, Kramer would be plagued by injuries in his eleven seasons spent with the Vikings, since he started 109 of a possible 152 games for the team over his tenure, and he started each game of a season just twice (1979 and 1982), beset by knee and shoulder injuries to go alongside concussions. Kramer had knee and shoulder injuries, multiple concussions and a 1987 preseason spine injury that he said “basically pretty much ended my career.”

The 1980 season proved a pivotal moment for him and the Vikings. Kramer would go 8–7 as a starter while leading the Vikings back to the postseason for the first time since 1978. He threw 3,397 yards with 23 touchdowns to 24 interceptions while having a 55.7 completion percentage. Kramer saved his best for near-last in the season. Facing the Cleveland Browns in the penultimate game of the regular season, he would take part of an iconic moment for the Vikings, as he threw a game-winning Hail Mary pass with six seconds left. They had trailed 23–9 in the fourth quarter, but Kramer threw three touchdowns in the quarter, including two to Ahmad Rashad late. On the final play of the game, Rashad was clustered in a group of Browns defenders but managed to catch the ball and carry himself into the end zone. The play, known as Miracle at the Met, clinched a division title for the Vikings. Kramer had his best game to that point, throwing 38-of-49 for 456 yards with four touchdowns. In the postseason that year, he faced off against the Philadelphia Eagles. Although they led 14–7 at halftime, a series of turnovers led to a 31–16 loss, and Kramer threw 19-of-39 for 209 yards with one touchdown and five interceptions.

In 1982, Kramer led the Vikings to the postseason with a strike-shortened 5–4 record. Facing the Atlanta Falcons in Minnesota, the Falcons led in the fourth quarter 21–16 before Kramer led them to a comeback to pull off a 30–24 win. He threw 20-of-34 passes for 253 yards with two touchdowns and one interception to lead the Vikings to the second round of the playoffs. Facing the Washington Redskins the following week, Kramer could not quite generate magic, as Washington won 21–7 on their way to the Super Bowl. Kramer threw 18-of-39 for 252 yards.

Kramer enjoyed his last flash of brilliance in 1986. He went 7–6 in his thirteen starts while throwing for 3,000 yards with 24 touchdowns to ten interceptions while leading the league in passer rating with 92.6. Kramer had his highlight day on September 28, 1986, as he torched the Green Bay Packers, even though his overall record against the Packers was 6–9, for six touchdown passes (with four in the first quarter) on a 16-of-25 day for 241 yards. He was named to the Pro Bowl for the first and only time. It was the last season which featured Kramer as the primary starter for the Vikings (starting thirteen games). In 1987, Kramer would split time with Wade Wilson (who had been on the team since 1981), with Kramer starting five games and Wilson starting seven, with Kramer noting a preseason injury to his spine as the injury that hastened his end of career. Kramer threw four touchdowns to three interceptions in his 81 passes for six game appearances. Kramer was the starting quarterback when the Vikings sneaked into the playoffs at 8–7, although he was taken out after a few drives for Wilson. Kramer (who was hurt on the first play of the game) was 5-of-9 on 50 yards as the Vikings rolled to a 44–10 win over the New Orleans Saints with Wilson at the helm. From there, the Vikings went to the NFC Championship Game with Wilson starting the next two games. For 1988, he made six starts with appearances in four other games. While going 4–2, he threw for 1,264 yards with five touchdowns to nine interceptions on 173 total pass attempts. For 1989, he closed out his Vikings career with appearances in eight games and four starts while throwing 906 yards and seven touchdowns and interceptions. His final appearance in a Vikings uniform was mop-up duty late in a playoff loss to San Francisco. He went 9-of-19 for 110 yards and an interception in the 41–13 loss. He was released after the season.

Kramer was signed by the New Orleans Saints in 1990. He appeared in only one game for the Saints (against the Vikings) and retired after the 1990 season.

== NFL career statistics ==
Legend
	Comeback Player of the Year
	Led the league
**Bold**	Career high

=== Regular season ===
Year	Team	Games			Passing								
Year	Team	GP	GS	Record	Cmp	Att	Pct	Yds	Avg	TD	Int	Lng	Rtg
1977	MIN	6	1	0−1	30	57	52.6	425	7.5	5	4	69	77.0
1978	MIN	4	0	–	5	16	31.3	50	3.1	0	1	19	15.1
1979	MIN	**16**	**16**	7−9	315	566	55.7	3,397	6.0	23	24	55	69.3
1980	MIN	15	15	**8−7**	299	522	57.3	3,582	6.9	19	23	**76**	72.2
1981	MIN	14	14	7−7	**322**	**593**	54.3	**3,912**	6.6	**26**	24	63	72.6
1982	MIN	9	9	5−4	176	308	57.1	2,037	6.6	15	12	65	77.3
1983	MIN	3	3	2−1	55	82	**67.1**	550	6.7	3	4	49	77.8
1984	MIN	9	9	2−7	124	236	52.5	1,678	7.1	9	10	70	70.6
1985	MIN	15	15	6−9	277	506	54.7	3,522	7.0	19	**26**	57	67.8
1986	MIN	13	13	7–6	208	372	55.9	3,000	**8.1**	24	10	**76**	**92.6**
1987	MIN	6	5	3−2	40	81	49.4	452	5.6	4	3	40	67.5
1988	MIN	10	6	4–2	83	173	48.0	1,264	7.3	5	9	47	60.5
1989	MIN	8	4	3–1	77	136	56.6	906	6.7	7	7	39	72.7
1990	NO	1	0	−	1	3	33.3	2	0.7	0	1	2	2.8
Career		129	110	54−56	2,012	3,651	55.1	24,777	6.8	159	158	76	72.8

== Personal life ==
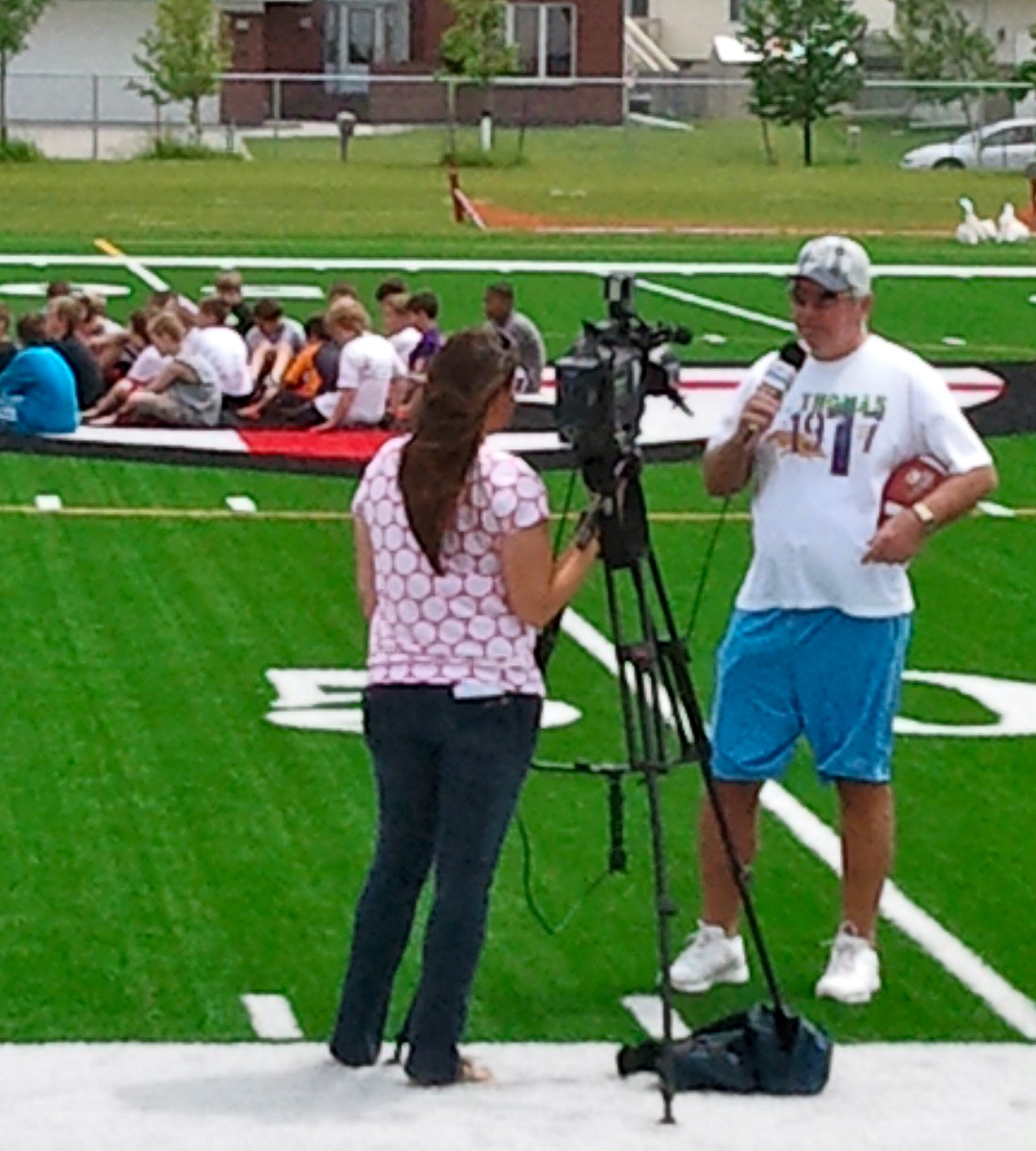
Kramer on camera with FOX News (KVRR) during a youth football clinic June 25, 2011, at Shanley High School in Fargo, ND.

After retirement in 1990, Kramer spent the next thirty years in Texas before returning to Minnesota after his third divorce in 2020.

On September 25, 2024, Kramer announced on Twitter that he was diagnosed with dementia a year prior, deciding to go public after fellow former Vikings quarterback Brett Favre announced his Parkinson's diagnosis and to bring awareness to for the NFL to assist with other players battling similar illnesses financially.

== See also ==
- List of NCAA major college football yearly total offense leaders
