= Ted Brown (American football) =

American football player (born 1957)

No. 23
- Position: Running back

Personal information
- Born: February 15, 1957 (age 69); High Point, North Carolina, U.S.
- Listed height: 5 ft 10 in (1.78 m)
- Listed weight: 206 lb (93 kg)

Career information
- High school: T. W. Andrews (High Point)
- College: NC State (1975–1978)
- NFL draft: 1979: 1st round, 16th overall pick

Career history
- Minnesota Vikings (1979–1986)

Awards and highlights
- Consensus All-American (1978); ACC Rookie of the Year (1975); 4× First-team All-ACC (1975–1978); NC State Wolfpack No. 23 retired

Career NFL statistics
- Rushing yards: 4,546
- Rushing average: 4.1
- Rushing touchdowns: 40
- Receptions: 339
- Receiving yards: 2,850
- Receiving touchdowns: 13
- Stats at Pro Football Reference
- College Football Hall of Fame

Thomas Edward "Ted" Brown (born February 15, 1957) is an American former professional football player who was a running back in the National Football League (NFL) for eight seasons. He played college football for the NC State Wolfpack, where he was recognized as an All-American. He was a first-round pick in the 1979 NFL draft, and played for the Minnesota Vikings.

== Early life ==
Brown was born in High Point, North Carolina. He attended T. Wingate Andrews High School.

== College career ==
By the time Brown graduated from North Carolina State University in 1978, he had set the Atlantic Coast Conference career rushing record with 4,602 yards and the single game rushing record with 251 yards against Penn State in 1977. He was an All-ACC pick for all four years in college and a consensus All-American in 1978.

=== College statistics ===
Legend
| | Led the ACC |
| | ACC record |
| **Bold** | Career high |

College rushing & receiving statistics
| Season | School | Games | Att | Yds | Avg | TD | Rec | Yds | Avg | TD |
| Team | | Rushing | | | | | Receiving | | | |
|---|---|---|---|---|---|---|---|---|---|---|
| **1975** | **NC State** | 10 | 142 | 913 | **6.4** | 12 | 16 | 160 | 10.0 | **1** |
| **1976** | **NC State** | **11** | 198 | 1,088 | 5.5 | **13** | **25** | **239** | 9.6 | 0 |
| **1977** | **NC State** | **11** | 218 | 1,251 | 5.7 | **13** | 24 | 164 | 6.8 | **1** |
| **1978** | **NC State** | **11** | **302** | **1,350** | 4.5 | 11 | 17 | 197 | **11.6** | 0 |
| Career | NC State | 43 | 860 | 4,602 | 5.4 | 49 | 82 | 760 | 9.3 | 2 |

In 2013, Brown was inducted into the College Football Hall of Fame.

== Professional career ==
The Minnesota Vikings chose Brown in the first round (sixteenth pick overall) of the 1979 NFL Draft, and he played for the Vikings from 1979 to 1986.

In December 1981, Brown accidentally shot himself while handling a loaded revolver. The injury required surgery to remove bullet and wood fragments from his upper thigh. There was a question of whether he would be able continue his career in football. Brown ended up recovering and retired after the 1986 NFL season.

Brown was inducted into the North Carolina Sports Hall of Fame in 1995.

== NFL career statistics ==
Legend
| **Bold** | Career high |

=== Regular season ===
| Year | Team | Games | | Rushing | | | | | Receiving | | | | |
| Year | Team | GP | GS | Att | Yds | Avg | Lng | TD | Rec | Yds | Avg | Lng | TD |
|---|---|---|---|---|---|---|---|---|---|---|---|---|---|
| 1979 | MIN | 14 | 9 | 130 | 551 | 4.2 | 34 | 1 | 31 | 197 | 6.4 | 35 | 0 |
| 1980 | MIN | **16** | **16** | 219 | 912 | 4.2 | 55 | 8 | 62 | 623 | **10.0** | **67** | 2 |
| 1981 | MIN | **16** | **16** | **274** | **1,063** | 3.9 | 34 | 6 | **83** | **694** | 8.4 | 63 | 2 |
| 1982 | MIN | 8 | 8 | 120 | 515 | 4.3 | 30 | 1 | 31 | 207 | 6.7 | 29 | 2 |
| 1983 | MIN | 10 | 8 | 120 | 476 | 4.0 | 43 | **10** | 41 | 357 | 8.7 | 25 | 1 |
| 1984 | MIN | 13 | 9 | 98 | 442 | **4.5** | 19 | 3 | 46 | 349 | 7.6 | 35 | **3** |
| 1985 | MIN | 14 | 9 | 93 | 336 | 3.6 | 30 | 7 | 30 | 291 | 9.7 | 54 | **3** |
| 1986 | MIN | 13 | 0 | 63 | 251 | 4.0 | **60** | 4 | 15 | 132 | 8.8 | 20 | 0 |
| | | 104 | 75 | 1,117 | 4,546 | 4.1 | 60 | 40 | 339 | 2,850 | 8.4 | 67 | 13 |

=== Playoffs ===
| Year | Team | Games | | Rushing | | | | | Receiving | | | | |
| Year | Team | GP | GS | Att | Yds | Avg | Lng | TD | Rec | Yds | Avg | Lng | TD |
|---|---|---|---|---|---|---|---|---|---|---|---|---|---|
| 1980 | MIN | 1 | 1 | 5 | 14 | 2.8 | 5 | 1 | 4 | 25 | 6.3 | **15** | 0 |
| 1982 | MIN | **2** | **2** | **37** | **146** | **3.9** | **18** | **2** | **8** | **71** | **8.9** | 14 | 0 |
| | | 3 | 3 | 42 | 160 | 3.8 | 18 | 3 | 12 | 96 | 8.0 | 15 | 0 |

== Post-retirement ==
After retiring from football, Brown became a juvenile probation officer in Saint Paul, Minnesota. His son, J. T., played with the Minnesota Wild of the National Hockey League.
