= Ray Yakavonis =

American football player (born 1957)

No. 91, 92
- Position: Defensive tackle

Personal information
- Born: January 20, 1957 (age 69); Wilkes-Barre, Pennsylvania, U.S.
- Listed height: 6 ft 4 in (1.93 m)
- Listed weight: 250 lb (113 kg)

Career information
- High school: Hanover (Hanover, Pennsylvania)
- College: East Stroudsburg
- NFL draft: 1980: 6th round, 148th overall pick

Career history
- Minnesota Vikings (1981–1983); Kansas City Chiefs (1983)

Career NFL statistics
- Sacks: 1
- Fumble recoveries: 1
- Stats at Pro Football Reference

Ray Yakavonis (born January 20, 1957) is an American former professional football player who was a defensive tackle in the National Football League (NFL). He played college football for the East Stroudsburg Warriors. He played in the NFL for the Minnesota Vikings from 1981 to 1983 and for the Kansas City Chiefs in 1983.
