= Sam Harrell =

American football player (born 1957)

No. 36
- Position: Running back

Personal information
- Born: February 7, 1957 (age 69); Ahoskie, North Carolina, U.S.
- Listed height: 6 ft 2 in (1.88 m)
- Listed weight: 217 lb (98 kg)

Career information
- College: East Carolina
- NFL draft: 1980: 11th round, 288th overall pick

Career history
- Minnesota Vikings (1981–1982); Houston Gamblers (1984–1985); Minnesota Vikings (1987)

Career NFL statistics
- Rushing yards: 15
- Rushing average: 2.5
- Receptions: 5
- Receiving yards: 43
- Stats at Pro Football Reference

Samuel Delmar Harrell Jr. (born February 7, 1957) is an American former professional football player who was a running back in the National Football League (NFL) and United States Football League (USFL). He played college football for the East Carolina Pirates. In the USFL, he rushed for 200 yards in a game between the Houston Gamblers and the Chicago Blitz in 1984.

== Rushing/Receiving ==
College career totals

Rushing				Receiving			
Att	Yds	Avg	TD	Rec	Yds	Avg	TD
172	1002	5.8	13	15	115	7.7	0

USFL career totals

Rushing				Receiving			
Att	Yds	Avg	TD	Rec	Yds	Avg	TD
120	697	5.8	14	25	304	12.2	2
