= John Swain =

American football player (born 1959)

No. 29, 40, 26
- Position: Cornerback

Personal information
- Born: September 4, 1959 (age 67); Miami, Florida, U.S.
- Listed height: 6 ft 1 in (1.85 m)
- Listed weight: 195 lb (88 kg)

Career information
- High school: Miami Carol City (Miami Gardens, Florida)
- College: Miami (FL)
- NFL draft: 1981: 4th round, 101st overall pick

Career history
- Minnesota Vikings (1981–1984); Miami Dolphins (1985); Pittsburgh Steelers (1985-1986); Green Bay Packers (1987)*; Miami Dolphins (1987)
- * Offseason or practice squad member only

Career NFL statistics
- Interceptions: 14
- Fumble recoveries: 2
- Stats at Pro Football Reference

John Wesley Swain (born September 4, 1959) is an American former professional football player who was a cornerback in the National Football League (NFL). He played college football for the Miami Hurricanes and was selected by the Minnesota Vikings in the fourth round in the 1981 NFL draft. He played a total of seven seasons in the NFL for the Vikings, the Pittsburgh Steelers, and the Miami Dolphins.
