= Henry Johnson (American football) =

American football player (born 1958)

No. 53
- Position: Linebacker

Personal information
- Born: March 20, 1958 (age 68); Wrens, Georgia, U.S.
- Listed height: 6 ft 1 in (1.85 m)
- Listed weight: 235 lb (107 kg)

Career information
- High school: Wrens
- College: Georgia Tech
- NFL draft: 1980: 7th round, 174th overall pick

Career history
- Minnesota Vikings (1980–1983)

Career NFL statistics
- Games played: 46
- Stats at Pro Football Reference

Henry William Johnson III (born March 20, 1958) is an American former professional football player who was a linebacker for the Minnesota Vikings of the National Football League (NFL). He played college football for the Georgia Tech Yellow Jackets.
