= Bob Bruer =

American football player and coach (born 1953)

No. 82
- Position: Tight end

Personal information
- Born: May 22, 1953 (age 73); Madison, Wisconsin, U.S.
- Listed height: 6 ft 5 in (1.96 m)
- Listed weight: 235 lb (107 kg)

Career information
- High school: Montello (WI)
- College: Mankato State
- NFL draft: 1975: 7th round, 221st overall pick

Career history
- Houston Oilers (1975)*; Dallas Cowboys (1976)*; Saskatchewan Roughriders (1976–1978); San Francisco 49ers (1979–1980); Minnesota Vikings (1980–1985)
- * Offseason or practice squad member only

Career NFL statistics
- Games played: 68
- Receptions: 72
- Receiving yards: 709
- Touchdowns: 8
- Stats at Pro Football Reference

Robert Anthony Bruer (born May 22, 1953) is an American former professional football player and coach. He played tight end in the National Football League (NFL) for the San Francisco 49ers and the Minnesota Vikings from 1977 until 1985. He played college football for the Mankato State Mavericks.

== Playing career ==
Bruer played for the San Francisco 49ers for one full season, and one game of a second season before being waived by Bill Walsh. The Minnesota Vikings selected him off waivers shortly after being waived, and he stayed with the Vikings for the remainder of his career. Before the NFL, Bruer played two seasons in the Canadian Football League (CFL) for the Saskatchewan Roughriders.

Bruer caught Joe Montana's first NFL touchdown pass against the Broncos on November 18, 1979. It was also Bruer's first NFL touchdown catch, and his only touchdown with the 49ers.

== Coaching career ==
Bruer later coached football at his alma mater, the Minnesota State University, Mankato.
