= Eddie Payton =

American football player (born 1951)

No. 26, 34, 31
- Positions: Return specialist, running back

Personal information
- Born: August 3, 1951 (age 75); Columbia, Mississippi, U.S.
- Listed height: 5 ft 8 in (1.73 m)
- Listed weight: 175 lb (79 kg)

Career information
- College: Jackson State
- NFL draft: 1973: undrafted

Career history
- Cleveland Browns (1977); Detroit Lions (1977); Kansas City Chiefs (1978); Toronto Argonauts (1979); Minnesota Vikings (1980–1982)

Career NFL statistics
- Return yards: 5,063
- Return touchdowns: 3
- Rushing attempts: 6
- Rushing yards: 28
- Stats at Pro Football Reference

Edward Charles Payton Jr. (born August 3, 1951) is an American former professional football player who was a running back and kick returner for five seasons in the National Football League (NFL) from 1977 to 1982 for the Cleveland Browns, Detroit Lions, Kansas City Chiefs and Minnesota Vikings. He also played in the Canadian Football League for the Toronto Argonauts in 1979 but was released after playing 2 games. He is the older brother of the late Chicago Bears player Walter Payton, the uncle of Brittney Payton and the uncle of the former WGN-TV sports anchor and current 670 The Score radio host Jarrett Payton.

Payton played college football for the Jackson State Tigers and signed undrafted by the Browns. Payton was primarily used as a kick and punt returner. He led the NFL with 53 kickoffs for 1184 yards in 1980. Payton ran back two kickoffs and one punt return for touchdowns in his career, two in the same game. On December 17, 1977, Payton ran a kick return and a punt return for a touchdown for the Lions in a game against the Vikings.

Eddie Payton is the former head golf coach at Jackson State, coaching both the men's and women's teams. From 1986 – 2016, Payton led the Jackson State Golf program to 37 Southwestern Athletic Conference championships. His men's team won 23 conference titles, 8 National Minority championships, and was the first HBCU to make the NCAA Men's National Golf Championships in 1995. He helped start the women's golf program in 1994. From there, he led the women's team to 14 SWAC titles and also the first HBCU NCAA appearance for women in 1999.
