= Rick Danmeier =

American football player (born 1952)

No. 7
- Position: Placekicker

Personal information
- Born: April 8, 1952 (age 74); St. Paul, Minnesota, U.S.
- Listed height: 6 ft 0 in (1.83 m)
- Listed weight: 194 lb (88 kg)

Career information
- High school: White Bear Lake (White Bear Lake, Minnesota)
- College: Sioux Falls
- NFL draft: 1974: undrafted

Career history
- Atlanta Falcons (1974)*; Minnesota Vikings (1975)*; Chicago Bears (1976)*; Minnesota Vikings (1977–1982)
- * Offseason or practice squad member only

Career NFL statistics
- Field goal: 70
- Field goal attempts: 106
- Field goal %: 66
- Longest field goal: 47
- Stats at Pro Football Reference

Richard Craig Danmeier (born April 8, 1952) is an American former professional football player who was a placekicker for six seasons with the Minnesota Vikings of the National Football League (NFL). He played college football for the Sioux Falls Cougars.

Danmeier attended White Bear Lake High School, in a suburb of St. Paul, Minnesota. He later attended Lakewood State Junior College, and then Sioux Falls College (now the University of Sioux Falls), where he played college football.

Danmeier tried out for the Vikings in 1976, then caught on with them in 1977, appearing in one game and kicking off one time, after which he was placed injured reserve due to an injury to his hand, in which his finger was amputated. His best season was 1981, when he missed only two field goals from inside the 40, and converted on 21 of 25 field goal attempts. He appeared in nine games for the Vikings in 1982, his last season with the team.

Danmeier was one of the last kickers to employ the straight-on style of kicking. His 1983 season came to an abrupt end late in the preseason when he suffered a herniated disk in his back that required surgery, and he was placed on injured reserve. He returned in 1984, attempting to win his job back, but the Vikings had also brought in Hall of Fame soccer-style kicker, future Hall of Famer Jan Stenerud to compete with Rick and Benny Ricardo (the kicker from the previous season) and Stenerud won the competition.

Danmeier's inactivity left Washington Redskins kicker Mark Moseley as the only remaining full-time placekicker in the NFL to employ the style; all NFL kickers today employ the "soccer-style", in which the kicker approaches the ball at an angle and kicks it with the instep, which was first introduced by the Hungarian brothers Pete and Charlie Gogolak.

Danmeier was inducted to the University of Sioux Falls Cougars Hall of Fame in 2000. He works as a sales representative in sporting goods.
