= 1981 NFL season =

American football season

Regular season
- Duration: September 6 – December 21, 1981

Playoffs
- Start date: December 27, 1981
- AFC Champions: Cincinnati Bengals
- NFC Champions: San Francisco 49ers

Super Bowl XVI
- Date: January 24, 1982
- Site: Pontiac Silverdome, Pontiac, Michigan
- Champions: San Francisco 49ers

Pro Bowl
- Date: January 31, 1982
- Site: Aloha Stadium

AFC teams: West, Central, East
NFC teams: West, Central, East

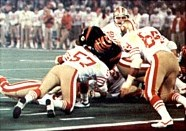
The 49ers playing against the Bengals in Super Bowl XVI.

The 1981 NFL season was the 62nd regular season of the National Football League. The season ended with Super Bowl XVI when the San Francisco 49ers defeated the Cincinnati Bengals 26–21 at the Pontiac Silverdome in Michigan.

== Draft ==
The 1981 NFL draft was held from April 28 to 29, 1981, at New York City's Sheraton Hotel. With the first pick, the New Orleans Saints selected running back George Rogers from the University of South Carolina.

== New referee ==
Cal Lepore, the line judge for Super Bowl III and referee for the Miracle at the Meadowlands, retired after the 1980 season. He would later become supervisor of officials in the United States Football League and a replay official in the NFL when it was adopted in 1986. Tom Dooley, who was assigned Super Bowl XV as line judge at the end of the 1981 season, was promoted to referee to replace Lepore.

== Major rule changes ==
- It is illegal for any player to put adhesive or slippery substances such as the product "Stickum" on his body, equipment or uniform. This rule is known as both the "Lester Hayes Rule" and the "Fred Biletnikoff Rule" since both players were notorious for using sticky substances to make it easier for them to intercept/catch passes.
- An offensive player who comes into the game wearing an illegal number for the position he takes must report to the referee before the start of the next play.
- The penalty for an ineligible receiver who touches a forward pass is a loss of down.
- The penalty for illegal use of hands, arms, or body (including holding) is reduced from 15 yards to 10 yards.
- The penalty for intentional grounding is modified: loss of down and 10 yards penalty from the previous spot, or if the foul occurs more than 10 yards from the line of scrimmage, loss of down at the spot of the foul.
- Officials began wearing numbers 21 through 25 within their position groups after going no higher than number 20 in 1979 and 1980.

== Deaths ==
- January 25 - Joe Kuharich, age 63. Played three seasons for the Chicago Cardinals. Later went on to be the head coach of the Cardinals, Washington Redskins and Philadelphia Eagles and was also the General Manager for the Eagles from 1965-68.
- April 28 - Cliff Battles, age 70. Running back for the Boston Braves, which later became the Washington Redskins. Elected to the Pro Football Hall Of Fame in 1968.
- July 1, 1981: Linebacker Rusty Chambers, the Miami Dolphins leading tackler in 1978 and 1979, died in an automobile accident.

== Regular season ==
=== Scheduling formula ===
Inter-conference
AFC East vs NFC East
AFC Central vs NFC West
AFC West vs NFC Central

== Division races ==
From 1970 to 2001, there were three divisions (Eastern, Central and Western) in each conference. The winners of each division, and a fourth "wild card" team based on the best non-division winner, qualified for the playoffs. The tiebreaker rules were changed to start with head-to-head competition, followed by division records, records against common opponents, and records in conference play.

=== National Football Conference ===
Week	Eastern		Central		Western		Wild Card (Home)		Wild Card (Road)	
1	Philadelphia, Dallas	1–0–0	Detroit, Green Bay, Tampa Bay	1–0–0	Atlanta	1–0–0	6 teams	1–0–0	6 teams	1–0–0
2	Philadelphia, Dallas	2–0–0	Detroit, Green Bay, Tampa Bay	1–1–0	Atlanta	2–0–0	6 teams	1–1–0	6 teams	1–1–0
3	Philadelphia, Dallas	3–0–0	All Five Teams	1–2–0	Atlanta	3–0–0	NY Giants	2–1–0	8 teams	1-2-0
4	Philadelphia, Dallas	4–0–0	Detroit, Minnesota, Tampa Bay	2–2–0	Atlanta	3–1–0	6 teams	2–2–0	6 teams	2–2–0
5	Philadelphia	5–0–0	Minnesota, Tampa Bay	3–2–0	Atlanta, Los Angeles, San Francisco	3–2–0	Dallas	4–1–0	5 teams	3-2-0
6	Philadelphia	6–0–0	Minnesota, Tampa Bay	4–2–0	Los Angeles, San Francisco	4–2–0	Dallas, Minnesota	4–2–0	San Francisco, Los Angeles	4–2–0
7	Philadelphia	6–1–0	Minnesota	5–2–0	San Francisco	5–2–0	Dallas	5–2–0	3 teams	4-3-0
8	Philadelphia	7–1–0	Minnesota	5–3–0	San Francisco	6–2–0	Dallas	6–2–0	N.Y. Giants	5-3-0
9	Philadelphia, Dallas	7–2–0	Minnesota, Tampa Bay	5–4–0	San Francisco	7–2–0	Philadelphia, Dallas	6–3–0	Atlanta, Los Angeles, Minnesota, N.Y. Giants, Tampa Bay	5-4-0
10	Philadelphia, Dallas	8–2–0	Minnesota	6–4–0	San Francisco	8–2–0	Philadelphia, Dallas	7–3–0	Atlanta, Los Angeles, N.Y. Giants, Tampa Bay	5–5–0
11	Philadelphia	9–2–0	Minnesota	7–4–0	San Francisco	8–3–0	Dallas	8–3–0	7 teams	5-6-0
12	Philadelphia, Dallas	9–3–0	Minnesota	7–5–0	San Francisco	9–3–0	Philadelphia, Dallas	9–3–0	Atlanta, Detroit, N.Y. Giants, Tampa Bay	6-6-0
13	Dallas	10–3–0	Detroit, Minnesota, Tampa Bay	7–6–0	San Francisco	10–3–0	Philadelphia	9–4–0	Atlanta, Detroit, Minnesota, Tampa Bay	7–6–0
14	Dallas	11–3–0	Tampa Bay	8–6–0	San Francisco	11–3–0	Philadelphia	9–5–0	Atlanta, Detroit, Green Bay, Minnesota, N.Y. Giants, St. Louis	7–7–0
15	Dallas	12–3–0	Detroit, Minnesota, Tampa Bay	8–7–0	San Francisco	12–3–0	Philadelphia	9–6–0	Detroit, Green Bay, N.Y. Giants, Tampa Bay	8–7–0
16	Dallas	12–4–0	Tampa Bay	9–7–0	San Francisco	13–3–0	Philadelphia	10–6–0	NY Giants	9–7–0

=== American Football Conference ===
Week	Eastern		Central		Western		Wild Card (Home)		Wild Card (Road)	
1	Baltimore, Buffalo, Miami	1–0–0	Cincinnati, Houston	1–0–0	Denver, Kansas City, San Diego	1–0–0	7 teams	1–0–0	7 teams	1–0–0
2	Miami	2–0–0	Cincinnati, Houston	2–0–0	Kansas City, San Diego	2–0–0	6 teams	2–0–0	6 teams	2–0–0
3	Miami	3–0–0	Cincinnati, Houston	2–1–0	San Diego	3–0–0	6 teams	2–1–0	6 teams	2–1–0
4	Miami	4–0–0	Cincinnati	3–1–0	Denver, Kansas City, San Diego	3–1–0	Denver, Kansas City, San Diego	3–1–0	Buffalo, Cleveland, Pittsburgh, Houston, Oakland	2–2–0
5	Miami	4–0–1	Cincinnati, Houston, Pittsburgh	3–2–0	Denver, San Diego	4–1–0	Denver, San Diego	4–1–0	Buffalo, Cincinnati, Houston, Kansas City, Pittsburgh	3-2-0
6	Miami	4–1–1	Cincinnati, Pittsburgh	4–2–0	Denver	5–1–0	Buffalo	4–2–0	Houston, Pittsburgh, San Diego, Kansas City	4-2-0
7	Miami	5–1–1	Cincinnati	5–2–0	Denver, Kansas City, San Diego	5–2–0	Denver, Kansas City, San Diego	5–2–0	Buffalo, Houston, Kansas City, Pittsburgh	4-3-0
8	Miami	5–2–1	Cincinnati, Pittsburgh	5–3–0	Kansas City	6–2–0	Buffalo	5–3–0	Cincinnati, Denver, Pittsburgh	5-3-0
9	Miami	6–2–1	Cincinnati	6–3–0	Denver, Kansas City, San Diego	6–3–0	Buffalo	6–3–0	Denver, Kansas City, San Diego	6-3-0
10	Miami	7–2–1	Cincinnati	7–3–0	Denver	7–3–0	San Diego	6–4–0	Buffalo, Kansas City	6–4–0
11	Miami	7–3–1	Cincinnati	8–3–0	Denver, Kansas City	7–4–0	Denver, Kansas City	7–4–0	N.Y. Jets	6–4–1
12	Miami, N.Y. Jets	7–4–1	Cincinnati	9–3–0	Denver, Kansas City	8–4–0	Denver, Kansas City	8–4–0	Miami, N.Y. Jets	7–4–1
13	Miami, N.Y. Jets	8–4–1	Cincinnati	10–3–0	Denver, Kansas City, San Diego	8–5–0	Miami, N.Y. Jets	8–4–1	Buffalo, Denver, Kansas City, Pittsburgh, San Diego	8–5–0
14	Miami	9–4–1	Cincinnati	10–4–0	Denver	9–5–0	Buffalo	9–5–0	N.Y. Jets	8–5–1
15	Miami	10–4–1	Cincinnati	11–4–0	Denver	10–5–0	Buffalo	10–5–0	N.Y. Jets	9–5–1
16	Miami	11–4–1	Cincinnati	12–4–0	San Diego	10–6–0	NY Jets	10–5–1	Buffalo	10–6–0

== Final standings ==
AFC East
	W	L	T	PCT	DIV	CONF	PF	PA	STK
^{(2)} Miami Dolphins	11	4	1	.719	5–2–1	8–3–1	345	275	W4
^{(4)} New York Jets	10	5	1	.656	6–1–1	8–5–1	355	287	W2
^{(5)} Buffalo Bills	10	6	0	.625	6–2	9–3	311	276	L1
Baltimore Colts	2	14	0	.125	2–6	2–10	259	533	W1
New England Patriots	2	14	0	.125	0–8	2–10	322	370	L9

AFC Central
	W	L	T	PCT	DIV	CONF	PF	PA	STK
^{(1)} Cincinnati Bengals	12	4	0	.750	4–2	10–2	421	304	W2
Pittsburgh Steelers	8	8	0	.500	3–3	5–7	356	297	L3
Houston Oilers	7	9	0	.438	4–2	6–6	281	355	W1
Cleveland Browns	5	11	0	.313	1–5	2–10	276	375	L5

AFC West
	W	L	T	PCT	DIV	CONF	PF	PA	STK
^{(3)} San Diego Chargers	10	6	0	.625	6–2	8–4	478	390	W2
Denver Broncos	10	6	0	.625	5–3	7–5	321	289	L1
Kansas City Chiefs	9	7	0	.563	5–3	7–5	343	290	W1
Oakland Raiders	7	9	0	.438	2–6	5–7	273	343	L2
Seattle Seahawks	6	10	0	.375	2–6	6–8	322	388	W1

NFC East
	W	L	T	PCT	DIV	CONF	PF	PA	STK
^{(2)} Dallas Cowboys	12	4	0	.750	6–2	8–4	367	277	L1
^{(4)} Philadelphia Eagles	10	6	0	.625	4–4	7–5	368	221	W1
^{(5)} New York Giants	9	7	0	.563	5–3	8–6	295	257	W3
Washington Redskins	8	8	0	.500	3–5	6–6	347	349	W3
St. Louis Cardinals	7	9	0	.438	2–6	4–8	315	408	L2

NFC Central
	W	L	T	PCT	DIV	CONF	PF	PA	STK
^{(3)} Tampa Bay Buccaneers	9	7	0	.563	6–2	9–3	315	268	W1
Detroit Lions	8	8	0	.500	4–4	6–6	397	322	L1
Green Bay Packers	8	8	0	.500	4–4	7–7	324	361	L1
Minnesota Vikings	7	9	0	.438	4–4	6–6	325	369	L5
Chicago Bears	6	10	0	.375	2–6	2–10	253	324	W3

NFC West
	W	L	T	PCT	DIV	CONF	PF	PA	STK
^{(1)} San Francisco 49ers	13	3	0	.813	5–1	10-2	357	250	W5
Atlanta Falcons	7	9	0	.438	3–3	6–6	426	355	L3
Los Angeles Rams	6	10	0	.375	2–4	5–7	303	351	L1
New Orleans Saints	4	12	0	.250	2–4	2–10	207	378	L4

=== Tiebreakers ===
- Baltimore finished ahead of New England in the AFC East based on head-to-head sweep (2–0).
- San Diego finished ahead of Denver in the AFC West based on better division record (6–2 to Broncos' 5–3).
- Buffalo was the second AFC Wild Card based on head-to-head victory over Denver (1–0).
- Detroit finished ahead of Green Bay in the NFC Central based on better record against common opponents (4–4 to Packers' 3–5).

== Playoffs ==
Jan 2 – Texas Stadium
3	Tampa Bay	0
Dec 27 – Veterans Stadium	Jan 10 – Candlestick Park
2	Dallas	38
NFC
5	NY Giants	27	2	Dallas	27
Jan 3 – Candlestick Park
4	Philadelphia	21	1	San Francisco	28
NFC Championship
5	NY Giants	24
Jan 24 – Pontiac Silverdome
1	San Francisco	38
Divisional round
Wild-card round	N1	San Francisco	26
Jan 2 – Miami Orange Bowl
A1	Cincinnati	21
Super Bowl XVI
3	San Diego	41*
Dec 27 – Shea Stadium	Jan 10 – Riverfront Stadium
2	Miami	38
AFC
5	Buffalo	31	3	San Diego	7
Jan 3 – Riverfront Stadium
4	NY Jets	27	1	Cincinnati	27
AFC Championship
5	Buffalo	21
1	Cincinnati	28

* Indicates overtime victory

== Records, milestones, and notable statistics ==
=== Records set ===
- Most Passes Attempted, Season, 709

Minnesota Vikings

- Most Punts, Season, 114

Chicago Bears

- Most Yards, Punt Returns, Both Teams, Game, 282

Los Angeles Rams (219) vs Atlanta Falcons (63), Oct 11, 1981

=== Records tied ===
- Most Touchdowns, Passing, Single Team, Game, 7

San Diego Chargers (vs Oakland Raiders) Nov 22, 1981

- Most Touchdowns, Punt Returns, Single Team, Game, 2

Los Angeles Rams (vs Atlanta Falcons) Oct 11, 1981

=== Baltimore Colts defense ===
The 1981 Baltimore Colts were one of the worst defenses in NFL history; they set five dubious defensive records:

- Most Points Allowed, Season, 533
- Most Touchdowns Allowed, Season, 68
- Most First Downs Allowed Season, 406
- Most Yards Allowed, Season, 6,793
- Fewest Punt Returns, Season, 12

== Statistical leaders ==
=== Team ===
Points scored	San Diego Chargers (478)
Total yards gained	San Diego Chargers (6,744)
Yards rushing	Detroit Lions (2,795)
Yards passing	San Diego Chargers (4,739)
Fewest points allowed	Philadelphia Eagles (221)
Fewest total yards allowed	Philadelphia Eagles (4,447)
Fewest rushing yards allowed	Detroit Lions (1,623)
Fewest passing yards allowed	Philadelphia Eagles (2,696)

== Awards ==
Most Valuable Player	Ken Anderson, quarterback, Cincinnati
Coach of the Year	Bill Walsh, San Francisco
Offensive Player of the Year	Ken Anderson, quarterback, Cincinnati
Defensive Player of the Year	Lawrence Taylor, linebacker, NY Giants
Offensive Rookie of the Year	George Rogers, running back, New Orleans
Defensive Rookie of the Year	Lawrence Taylor, linebacker, NY Giants
Man of the Year	Lynn Swann, wide receiver, Pittsburgh
Comeback Player of the Year	Ken Anderson, quarterback, Cincinnati
Super Bowl Most Valuable Player	Joe Montana, quarterback, San Francisco

== Coaching changes ==
- Denver Broncos: Dan Reeves replaced the fired Red Miller.
- Houston Oilers: Bum Phillips was fired and replaced by Ed Biles.
- New Orleans Saints: Bum Phillips joined the Saints after being fired by the Oilers. Dick Nolan was fired after a 0–12 start in 1980, and Dick Stanfel took over as interim.
- Washington Redskins: Joe Gibbs replaced Jack Pardee.

== Stadium changes ==
The home of the San Diego Chargers, San Diego Stadium, was renamed Jack Murphy Stadium in memory of local sportswriter Jack Murphy

== Uniform changes ==
- The Cincinnati Bengals made significant modifications to their uniforms for the first time since the team's debut in 1968, discontinuing the design similar to the Cleveland Browns' jerseys. Orange and black tiger stripes adorned the shoulder stripes of the jersey and the side striping of the pants. Black tiger stripes were also added to the orange helmets, replacing the Bengals wordmark.
- The Dallas Cowboys darkened the shade of their blue jerseys from royal to navy blue, with the numerals becoming silver. The Cowboys wore this blue jersey through 1994.
- The Houston Oilers resumed wearing blue pants with their white jerseys after a one-season hiatus; in addition, the team also changed their face masks from gray to red.
- The Los Angeles Rams switched from gray to navy blue face masks.

== Television ==
This was the fourth and final year under the league's broadcast contracts with ABC, CBS, and NBC to televise Monday Night Football, the NFC package, and the AFC package, respectively. The league then negotiated to have all three networks renew their deals for another five years.

John Madden became the lead color commentator for CBS, replacing Tom Brookshier who moved into a play-by-play role. However CBS Sports executives debated on whether Madden should be paired with incumbent lead play-by-play announcer Pat Summerall or should #2 announcer Vin Scully be promoted to the role. To resolve the situation, both Scully and Summerall were paired with Madden in four-week stretches. Scully was paired with Madden during the first four weeks of the season while Summerall was primarily covering the US Open Tennis Championships. Then Summerall called games with Madden while Scully covered the Major League Baseball playoffs for CBS Radio. After the eighth week of the NFL season, CBS Sports executives decided that Summerall had better chemistry with Madden than Scully did. Scully was later assigned as a consolation prize the NFC Championship Game. After the season, he would move to NBC to cover Major League Baseball and golf, but he decided to never call NFL games again.

=== Regular season game not broadcast by Network TV ===
Date	Time	Teams	Local TV	Announcers
September 5, 1981	8:00 PM EDT	Minnesota @ Tampa Bay	KSTP-TV (Minnesota); WTOG-TV (Tampa Bay)
