= Minnesota Vikings all-time roster =

1,265 players have appeared in at least one regular season or postseason game in the National Football League (NFL) for the Minnesota Vikings since 1961. This list is accurate through the end of the 2025 NFL season.

== A ==
- Ameer Abdullah
- Husain Abdullah
- Bobby Abrams
- Steve Ache
- Scott Adams
- Tom Adams
- Tony Adams
- Jordan Addison
- Hakeem Adeniji
- Xavier Adibi
- John Adickes
- Cam Akers
- Grady Alderman
- Derrick Alexander (born 1971)
- Derrick Alexander (born 1973)
- Mackensie Alexander
- Rufus Alexander
- Tuineau Alipate
- Asher Allen
- Jared Allen
- Jonathan Allen
- Nate Allen
- Terry Allen
- Aundrae Allison
- Morten Andersen
- Abdullah Anderson
- Alfred Anderson
- Gary Anderson
- Scott Anderson
- Richard Angulo
- Sam Anno
- Leo Araguz
- Hasson Arbubakrr
- Emmanuel Arceneaux
- Devin Aromashodu
- Chuck Arrobio
- Brian Asamoah
- Walker Lee Ashley
- Matt Asiata
- Pete Athas
- John Avery
- Adrian Awasom
- Obafemi Ayanbadejo
- Remi Ayodele

== B ==
- Jeff Baca
- Brad Badger
- Dan Bailey
- Al Baker
- Chase Baker
- Rashad Baker
- Randy Baldwin
- Jerry Ball
- Christian Ballard
- Gary Ballman
- Antonio Banks
- Joe Banyard
- Jake Bargas
- Roy Barker
- Billy Ray Barnes
- Kalon Barnes
- Tomur Barnes
- Harlon Barnett
- Anthony Barr
- Hank Baskett
- Anthony Bass
- D'Wayne Bates
- Jim Battle
- Tyler Batty
- David Bavaro
- Rick Bayless
- Tim Baylor
- Autry Beamon
- John Beasley
- Willie Beavers
- Nick Bebout
- Hal Bedsole
- Chad Beebe
- Blake Bell
- Rick Bell
- Barry Bennett
- Darren Bennett
- Michael Bennett
- Pete Bercich
- Joe Berger
- Mitch Berger
- Bernard Berrian
- Bob Berry
- Jordan Berry
- Ray Berry
- Sean Berton
- Rufus Bess
- Greg Biekert
- Matt Birk
- Bill Bishop
- Desmond Bishop
- Ross Blacklock
- Mekhi Blackmon
- Joe Blahak
- Matt Blair
- Paul Blair
- Tony Bland
- Robert Blanton
- Greg Blue
- Orlando Bobo
- Bookie Bolin
- Brooks Bollinger
- Conrad Bolston
- Steve Bono
- Lorenzo Booker
- Alex Boone
- Dave Boone
- Mike Boone
- Andrew Booth Jr.
- Tuf Borland
- Todd Bouman
- Tashawn Bower
- Larry Bowie
- Brent Boyd
- Kris Boyd
- Malik Boyd
- Jim Boylan
- Garrett Bradbury
- Ronnie Bradford
- Sam Bradford
- Jeff Brady
- Jordan Brailford
- Don Bramlett
- Blake Brandel
- David Braxton
- Bashaud Breeland
- Bob Breitenstein
- Jack Brewer
- Teddy Bridgewater
- Doug Brien
- Greg Briggs
- James Brim
- Mike Brim
- Jasper Brinkley
- Bubby Brister
- Charley Britt
- Tramaine Brock
- Lorenzo Bromell
- Max Brosmer
- Kentrell Brothers
- Bill Brown
- Larry Brown
- Mack Brown
- Norris Brown
- Patrick Brown
- Ralph Brown
- Richard Brown
- Robert Brown
- Ted Brown
- Terry Brown
- Joey Browner
- Bob Bruer
- Larry Brune
- Dave Bruno
- Bobby Bryant
- Tim Bryant
- Bart Buetow
- Jonathan Bullard
- Mike Bundra
- Nate Burleson
- John Burrough
- Brandon Burton
- Derek Burton
- Stephen Burton
- Bill Butler
- Duane Butler
- Ken Byers
- Camryn Bynum
- Henry Byrd

== C ==
- Ivan Caesar
- Jamie Caleb
- Lee Calland
- Greg Camarillo
- John Campbell
- Kelly Campbell
- Bill Cappleman
- Daniel Carlson
- John Carlson
- Preston Carpenter
- Ron Carpenter
- Jay Carroll
- Malcolm Carson
- Andre Carter II
- Anthony Carter
- Cris Carter
- Dale Carter
- Jason Carter
- Kyle Carter
- Tyrone Carter
- Blake Cashman
- Dave Casper
- Matt Cassel
- Matt Cercone
- Byron Chamberlain
- Chaz Chambliss
- Ty Chandler
- Doug Chapman
- John Charles
- Corey Chavous
- Dan Chisena
- Jim Christopherson
- Jeff Christy
- Patrick Chukwurah
- Lewis Cine
- Vinny Ciurciu
- Neil Clabo
- Chris Claiborne
- Jessie Clark
- Kenny Clark
- Ken Clarke
- Leon Clarke
- T. J. Clemmings
- Duane Clemons
- Ezra Cleveland
- Marvin Cobb
- Robert Cobb
- Paul Coffman
- Audie Cole
- Mason Cole
- Al Coleman
- Dan Coleman
- Greg Coleman
- Stacy Coley
- Stalin Colinet
- Aviante Collins
- Calvin Collins
- Dwight Collins
- Fabray Collins
- Britton Colquitt
- Jeff Colter
- Tom Compton
- Bill Conaty
- Tyler Conklin
- Ryan Connelly
- Chris Cook
- Dalvin Cook
- Ryan Cook
- Adrian Cooper
- Jon Cooper
- Marquis Cooper
- Frank Cornish
- José Cortéz
- Kirk Cousins
- Sam Cowart
- Fred Cox
- Roger Craig
- Steve Craig
- Scott Crichton
- Henri Crockett
- Carlester Crumpler
- Brad Culpepper
- Daunte Culpepper
- Ed Culpepper
- Douglas Cunningham
- Randall Cunningham
- Rick Cunningham
- Gary Cuozzo
- Travis Curtis
- Austin Cutting

== D ==
- Bernard Dafney
- Carroll Dale
- Antico Dalton
- LeShun Daniels
- Rick Danmeier
- Cameron Dantzler
- Sam Darnold
- Christian Darrisaw
- Ron Daugherty
- Marcus Davenport
- Brian Davis
- Davion Davis
- Doug Davis
- Greg Davis
- Jamin Davis
- John Davis
- Nick Davis
- Rod Davis
- Todd Davis
- Wyatt Davis
- Dale Dawson
- Rhett Dawson
- Sheldon Day
- Larry Dean
- Ted Dean
- Chris DeGeare
- Jack Del Rio
- Greg DeLong
- Calvin Demery
- Earl Denny
- Al Denson
- Bob Denton
- Andrew DePaola
- Dean Derby
- Kevin Devine
- Jim Dick
- Paul Dickson
- Stefon Diggs
- Scott Dill
- Brandon Dillon
- Terry Dillon
- Steve Dils
- Ryan D'Imperio
- Cris Dishman
- David Dixon
- Joshua Dobbs
- Josh Doctson
- Chris Doleman
- Oscar Donahue
- Myles Dorn
- Nat Dorsey
- Mike Doss
- Devante Downs
- D. J. Dozier
- Dakota Dozier
- Vladimir Ducasse
- Bill Dugan
- Jeff Dugan
- Doug Dumler
- Mark Dusbabek
- Troy Dye

== E ==
- Nick Easton
- Adimchinobe Echemandu
- Paul Edinger
- Brad Edwards
- Dixon Edwards
- Dovonte Edwards
- Jimmy Edwards
- Ray Edwards
- Pat Eilers
- Mike Eischeid
- Clifton Eley
- Pat Elflein
- Ben Ellefson
- Carl Eller
- Aaron Elling
- Kenrick Ellis
- Rhett Ellison
- Neil Elshire
- Marcus Epps
- Hayden Epstein
- Akayleb Evans
- Chuck Evans
- David Evans
- Fred Evans
- Eric Everett
- Antone Exum

== F ==
- Hap Farber
- Heath Farwell
- Ciatrick Fason
- Paul Faust
- Brett Favre
- Willie Fears
- Grant Feasel
- Dan Feeney
- Jerome Felton
- Tai Felton
- Rick Fenney
- Bob Ferguson
- Charley Ferguson
- Robert Ferguson
- Jay Fiedler
- Mark Fields
- Steve Finch
- Jason Fisk
- Jamie Fitzgerald
- Mike Fitzgerald
- Paul Flatley
- Michael Floyd
- Sharrif Floyd
- Toniu Fonoti
- Chris Foote
- Kai Forbath
- Chase Ford
- Chuck Foreman
- Melvin Fowler
- Dennis Fowlkes
- Eric Frampton
- Tom Franckhauser
- Donald Frank
- Josh Freeman
- Steve Freeman
- Gus Frerotte
- Will Fries
- David Frisch
- Isaac Fruechte
- Phil Frye
- Corey Fuller
- Darrell Fullington
- Brandon Fusco

== G ==
- Tony Galbreath
- Frank Gallagher
- Jim Gallery
- Laroni Gallishaw
- Wayne Gallman
- John Galvin
- Rich Gannon
- Teddy Garcia
- Dave Garnett
- Winfield Garnett
- Myles Gaskin
- Billy Gault
- William Gay
- Ben Gedeon
- Jeff George
- Ron George
- John Gerak
- Toby Gerhart
- Carl Gersbach
- Willie Gillespie
- John Gilliam
- Stephon Gilmore
- Jeff Gladney
- Jason Glenn
- Vencie Glenn
- Andrew Glover
- Robert Goff
- Adam Goldberg
- Bob Goodridge
- Charlie Goodrum
- Hunter Goodwin
- Charles Gordon
- Tay Gowan
- Scottie Graham
- MarQueis Gray
- Torrian Gray
- Dick Grecni
- Robert Green
- Jonathan Greenard
- Marcellus Greene
- Chad Greenway
- Everson Griffen
- Cedric Griffin
- Shaquill Griffin
- Robert Griffith
- Otis Grigsby
- Bob Grim
- Ron Groce
- Kamu Grugier-Hill
- Neal Guggemos
- Letroy Guion
- Eric Guliford
- Jim Gustafson

== H ==
- Adam Haayer
- Brian Habib
- Dale Hackbart
- John Haines
- Dick Haley
- Jaren Hall
- Lemanski Hall
- Steve Hall
- Tom Hall
- Windlan Hall
- C. J. Ham
- Wes Hamilton
- Shelly Hammonds
- Alonzo Hampton
- Harrison Hand
- Ben Hanks
- Tom Hannon
- Don Hansen
- Mark Hanson
- Javon Hargrave
- Jim Hargrove
- Sam Harrell
- Anthony Harris
- Billy Harris
- Darryl Harris
- James Harris
- Joe Harris
- John Harris
- Michael Harris
- Napoleon Harris
- Paul Harris
- Robert Harris
- Steve Harris
- Martin Harrison
- N'Keal Harry
- Mike Hartenstine
- Percy Harvin
- Clint Haslerig
- Don Hasselbeck
- Matthew Hatchette
- Rip Hawkins
- Leo Hayden
- Ray Hayes
- Tae Hayes
- Jeff Hazuga
- E. J. Henderson
- Erin Henderson
- John Henderson
- Keith Henderson
- Wymon Henderson
- Hale Hentges
- Matt Hernandez
- Chris Herndon
- Anthony Herrera
- David Herron
- Artis Hicks
- Jordan Hicks
- Maurice Hicks
- Wally Hilgenberg
- Gary Hill
- Holton Hill
- King Hill
- Rashod Hill
- Shaun Hill
- Ira Hillary
- Ronnie Hillman
- Carl Hilton
- John Hilton
- George Hinkle
- Chris Hinton
- Kyle Hinton
- Jimmy Hitchcock
- Leroy Hoard
- T. J. Hockenson
- Gerald Hodges
- Kelly Holcomb
- Darius Holland
- John Holland
- Alexander Hollins
- Jacob Hollister
- Randy Holloway
- Rob Holmberg
- Bruce Holmes
- Jalyn Holmes
- Issiac Holt
- Jim Hough
- Bobby Houston
- Chris Hovan
- Bryan Howard
- David Howard
- Willie Howard
- Keenan Howry
- Joe Huber
- Dave Huffman
- Mike Hughes
- Don Hultz
- Danielle Hunter
- Will Hunter
- Steve Hutchinson
- Gerry Huth

== I ==
- Donald Igwebuike
- George Iloka
- Darryl Ingram
- Ed Ingram
- Tyrion Ingram-Dawkins
- Ken Irvin
- Tim Irwin
- Danny Isidora
- Qadry Ismail
- Ron Israel

== J ==
- Alfred Jackson
- Donovan Jackson
- Harold Jackson
- Joey Jackson
- Lucky Jackson
- Tarvaris Jackson
- Theo Jackson
- Trishton Jackson
- Nate Jacquet
- Cedric James
- Craig James
- Dick James
- Erasmus James
- A. J. Jefferson
- Justin Jefferson
- Noel Jenke
- Carlos Jenkins
- Izel Jenkins
- Michael Jenkins
- Greg Jennings
- Bill Jobko
- Bethel Johnson
- Brad Johnson
- Charles Johnson
- Charlie Johnson (born 1952)
- Charlie Johnson (born 1984)
- Chris Johnson
- Dennis Johnson
- Eddie Johnson
- Gene Johnson
- George Johnson
- Henry Johnson
- Jaleel Johnson
- Jaymar Johnson
- Joe Johnson
- Ken Johnson
- Lee Johnson
- Marcus Johnson
- Olabisi Johnson
- Olrick Johnson
- Sammy Johnson
- Spencer Johnson
- Toby Johnson
- Tom Johnson
- Tyrell Johnson
- Lance Johnstone
- Aaron Jones
- Brett Jones
- Chris Jones
- Clinton Jones
- Hassan Jones
- Henry Jones
- Jeshaun Jones
- Mike Jones (born 1960)
- Mike Jones (born 1966)
- Patrick Jones II
- Rushen Jones
- Shawn Jones
- Tim Jones
- Wayne Jones
- Andrew Jordan
- Jeff Jordan
- Steve Jordan
- Greg Joseph
- Linval Joseph
- Don Joyce
- Michael Jurgens

== K ==
- Josh Kaddu
- Matt Kalil
- Todd Kalis
- Joe Kapp
- Rich Karlis
- Karl Kassulke
- Matt Katula
- Jayron Kearse
- Case Keenum
- Mark Kellar
- Eric Kelly
- Lewis Kelly
- Ryan Kelly
- Eric Kendricks
- Jimmy Kennedy
- Zac Kerin
- Austin Keys
- Brady Keys
- Keith Kidd
- Kobe King
- Phil King
- Doug Kingsriter
- John Kirby
- William Kirksey
- Jim Kleinsasser
- Josh Kline
- Chris Kluwe
- Kurt Knoff
- Greg Koch
- Ross Kolodziej
- Terry Kosens
- Kent Kramer
- Tommy Kramer
- Paul Krause
- William Kwenkeu

== L ==
- Bob Lacey
- Corbin Lacina
- Chuck Lamson
- Emmanuel Lamur
- Jim Langer
- Bill Lapham
- Gary Larsen
- Jim Lash
- Steve Lawson
- Ben Leber
- Terry LeCount
- Amp Lee
- Bob Lee
- Carl Lee
- Vershon Lee
- Jim Leo
- Darrell Lester
- Greg Lewis
- Leo Lewis
- Brody Liddiard
- Errol Linden
- Everett Lindsay
- Jim Lindsey
- Zach Line
- Bob Lingenfelter
- Cliff Livingston
- Chris Liwienski
- Phil Loadholt
- Jeff Locke
- Cullen Loeffler
- Jake Long
- Ryan Longwell
- Fletcher Louallen
- Terry Love
- Kirk Lowdermilk
- Vederian Lowe
- Dean Lowry
- Derrel Luce
- Bob Lurtsema
- Mike Lush
- Blake Lynch
- James Lynch
- Billy Lyon

== M ==
- Dylan Mabin
- Mark MacDonald
- Earsell Mackbee
- Greg Mancz
- James Manley
- Maurice Mann
- Archie Manning
- Sean Mannion
- Greg Manusky
- Ed Marinaro
- Jim Marshall
- Larry Marshall
- Amos Martin
- Billy Martin
- Chris Martin
- Doug Martin
- Steve Martin
- Jordan Mason
- Tommy Mason
- Hercules Mata'afa
- Alexander Mattison
- Andy Maurer
- Michael Mauti
- Marc May
- Doug Mayberry
- Michael Mayes
- Kivuusama Mays
- Stafford Mays
- Bobby McCain
- J. J. McCarthy
- Marcus McCauley
- Brent McClanahan
- Skip McClendon
- John McCormick
- Sam McCullum
- Mike McCurry
- Ed McDaniel
- Randall McDaniel
- Kevin McDermott
- Mardye McDole
- Ramos McDonald
- Hugh McElhenny
- Reggie McElroy
- Mike McGill
- T. Y. McGill
- Dwight McGlothern
- Lamar McGriggs
- Marlin McKeever
- Tyrone McKenzie
- Bryant McKinnie
- Jerick McKinnon
- Jim McMahon
- Audray McMillian
- Billy McMullen
- Donovan McNabb
- Fred McNeill
- Tom McNeill
- Dan McQuaid
- Jake McQuaide
- Bill McWatters
- Johnny McWilliams
- Nate Meadors
- Tim Meamber
- Mike Mercer
- Mike Merriweather
- Josh Metellus
- Wayne Meylan
- Phil Micech
- Tom Michel
- Dave Middleton
- Keith Millard
- Corey Miller
- Kevin Miller
- Larry Miller
- Robert Miller
- Ted Million
- Bryan Mills
- Garrett Mills
- John Henry Mills
- Charles Mincy
- Jayme Mitchell
- Marvin Mitchell
- Melvin Mitchell
- Myron Mitchell
- Kenny Mixon
- Fred Molden
- Kellen Mond
- Pete Monty
- Warren Moon
- Leonard Moore
- Manfred Moore
- Mewelde Moore
- Zach Moore
- Fabian Moreau
- David Morgan II
- Don Morgan
- Kyle Morrell
- Jack Morris
- Mike Morris
- Harold Morrow
- C. J. Mosley
- Randy Moss
- Rich Mostardi
- Mike Mularkey
- Mark Mullaney
- Nick Mullens
- Johnny Mundt
- Captain Munnerlyn
- Byron Murphy
- Fred Murphy
- Gabriel Murphy
- Yo Murphy
- Eddie Murray
- Latavius Murray
- Nick Muse
- Najee Mustafaa
- Frank Myers

== N ==
- Jalen Nailor
- Peter Najarian
- Martin Nance
- Michael Nattiel
- Larry Ned
- Ben Nelson
- Chuck Nelson
- Darrin Nelson
- David Nelson
- Jim Nelson
- Rhett Nelson
- Richard Newbill
- Keith Newman
- Terence Newman
- Harry Newsome
- Tim Newton
- Yannick Ngakoue
- Hardy Nickerson Jr.
- Parry Nickerson
- Steve Niehaus
- Roosevelt Nix
- Al Noga
- Keith Nord
- Tony Norman
- Gabe Northern
- Storm Norton
- Brent Novoselsky
- Kene Nwangwu

== O ==
- Terry Obee
- Dave O'Brien
- Ifeadi Odenigbo
- Willie Offord
- Jeff Okudah
- Josh Oliver
- Kenny Onatolu
- Andre O'Neal
- Brian O'Neill
- Frank Ori
- Dave Osborn
- K.J. Osborn
- Clancy Osborne
- Esezi Otomewo
- Jeff Overbaugh
- Richard Owens

== P ==
- Ivan Pace
- Alan Page
- Jarrad Page
- David Palmer
- Mitch Palmer
- Anthony Parker
- Rickey Parks
- David Parry
- Doug Paschal
- Cordarrelle Patterson
- Jerry Patton
- Bryce Paup
- Karl Paymah
- Eddie Payton
- J. C. Pearson
- John Pentecost
- Pete Perreault
- Jason Perry
- Dick Pesonen
- Ken Petersen
- Adrian Peterson
- Patrick Peterson
- Anthony Phillips
- Bobby Phillips
- Harrison Phillips
- Joe Phillips
- Red Phillips
- Michael Pierce
- Artose Pinner
- Kurt Ploeger
- Ray Poage
- Randy Poltl
- Christian Ponder
- Ron Porter
- Art Powell
- Brandon Powell
- John Powers
- Shaun Prater
- Travis Prentice
- Jim Prestel
- Jabari Price
- Myles Price
- Anthony Prior
- Ted Provost
- MyCole Pruitt
- Palmer Pyle

== Q ==
- David Quessenberry
- Ryan Quigley
- Kelly Quinn

== R ==
- Mike Rabold
- John Randle
- Al Randolph
- Ahmad Rashad
- Randy Rasmussen
- Mistral Raymond
- Jalen Reagor
- Jalen Redmond
- Jarvis Redwine
- Bobby Reed
- Chris Reed
- D'Aundre Reed
- Jake Reed
- Oscar Reed
- Will Reichard
- Jerry Reichow
- Riley Reiff
- Mike Reilly
- Allen Reisner
- Mike Remmers
- Lance Rentzel
- Fuad Reveiz
- Darius Reynaud
- Xavier Rhodes
- Buster Rhymes
- Benny Ricardo
- Allen Rice
- Sidney Rice
- Greg Richardson
- Kyle Richardson
- Sheldon Richardson
- Tony Richardson
- Bo Richter
- Curtis Riley
- Steve Riley
- Dalton Risner
- Fred Robbins
- Aldrick Robinson
- Cam Robinson
- Edmond Robinson
- Gerald Robinson
- Josh Robinson
- Koren Robinson
- Marcus Robinson
- Brian Robison
- Mark Rodenhauser
- Isaiah Rodgers
- Levi Drake Rodriguez
- Chris Rogers
- Nick Rogers
- Dave Roller
- John Parker Romo
- George Rose
- Mike Rosenthal
- Ted Rosnagle
- Derek Ross
- Curtis Rouse
- Walter Rouse
- Justin Rowland
- Jaquelin Roy
- Karl Rubke
- Dwayne Rudd
- Kyle Rudolph
- Pat Russ
- Brian Russell

== S ==
- Sean Salisbury
- Dru Samia
- Ron Sams
- Ken Sanders
- Jamarca Sanford
- Benny Sapp
- Bob Sapp
- Craig Sauer
- Talance Sawyer
- Mike Saxon
- John Scardina
- Ed Schenk
- Austin Schlottmann
- Roy Schmidt
- Bob Schmitz
- Bob Schnelker
- Adam Schreiber
- Jeff Schuh
- Geoff Schwartz
- Carey Scott
- Darrion Scott
- Randy Scott
- Todd Scott
- Zavier Scott
- Bucky Scribner
- Ron Selesky
- Andrew Sendejo
- Robin Sendlein
- Joe Senser
- Wasswa Serwanga
- Ed Sharockman
- Tajae Sharpe
- Darren Sharper
- George Shaw
- Terrance Shaw
- Jerry Shay
- Duke Shelley
- Austin Shepherd
- Ashley Sheppard
- Lito Sheppard
- Marcus Sherels
- Trent Sherfield
- Will Sherman
- Visanthe Shiancoe
- Lebron Shields
- Jeff Siemon
- Arnie Simkus
- Howard Simpson
- Jerome Simpson
- Ben Sims
- William Sims
- Jeremiah Sirles
- Scott Sisson
- Justin Skule
- Mike Slaton
- Andre Smith
- Cameron Smith
- Cedric Smith
- Daryl Smith
- Dwight Smith
- Fernando Smith
- Gordon Smith
- Greg Smith
- Harrison Smith
- Irv Smith Jr.
- Jimmy Smith
- Khreem Smith
- Lyman Smith
- Onterrio Smith
- Raonall Smith
- Robert Smith (born 1962)
- Robert Smith (born 1972)
- Rodney Smith
- Steve Smith
- T. J. Smith
- Tye Smith
- Wayne Smith
- Za'Darius Smith
- Ihmir Smith-Marsette
- Fred Smoot
- Norm Snead
- Matt Snider
- Ariel Solomon
- Jesse Solomon
- Willie Spencer
- Charles Stackhouse
- Timothy Starks
- Robert Steele
- Robert Steeples
- Bob Stein
- Jan Stenerud
- Mike Stensrud
- Joe Stepanek
- Shamar Stephen
- Mac Stephens
- Todd Steussie
- James Stewart
- Mark Stewart
- Ken Stills
- Luke Stocker
- Steve Stonebreaker
- Thomas Strauthers
- Fred Strickland
- Korey Stringer
- Scott Studwell
- Chandon Sullivan
- John Sullivan
- Charlie Sumner
- Milt Sunde
- Chazz Surratt
- Doug Sutherland
- Archie Sutton
- Paul Sverchek
- Bill Swain
- John Swain
- Dennis Swilley

== T ==
- Naufahu Tahi
- Taki Taimani
- Sione Takitaki
- Darryl Talley
- Cordrea Tankersley
- Thomas Tapeh
- Fran Tarkenton
- Ben Tate
- Robert Tate
- Pete Tatman
- Terry Tausch
- Chester Taylor
- Eric Taylor
- Travis Taylor
- Willie Teal
- Mike Teeter
- Derek Tennell
- Keith Thibodeaux
- Adam Thielen
- Andre Thomas
- Broderick Thomas
- Dontarrious Thomas
- Henry Thomas
- Orlando Thomas
- Roc Thomas
- Tavierre Thomas
- NaJee Thompson
- Mike Tice
- Mike Tilleman
- Jerry Tillery
- Mick Tingelhoff
- Dave Tobey
- Dalvin Tomlinson
- Khyiris Tonga
- Robert Tonyan
- Gino Torretta
- Justin Trattou
- Laquon Treadwell
- Mel Triplett
- Olanda Truitt
- Jason Trusnik
- Esera Tuaolo
- Bob Tucker
- Dallas Turner
- John Turner
- Maurice Turner
- Mike Turner

== U ==
- Kenechi Udeze
- Oli Udoh

== V ==
- Ron Vander Kelen
- Andrew Van Ginkel
- Sean Vanhorse
- Nick Vannett
- Larry Vargo
- Ruben Vaughan
- Zemaiah Vaughn
- John Vella
- Jim Vellone
- Nick Vigil
- Luiji Vilain
- Stu Voigt

== W ==
- Billy Waddy
- Bobby Wade
- Danny Wagoner
- Van Waiters
- Bobby Walden
- Adam Walker
- Denard Walker
- Frank Walker
- Herschel Walker
- Jay Walker
- Jimmy Walker
- Jackie Wallace
- Mike Wallace
- Blair Walsh
- Chris Walsh
- Troy Walters
- Jay Ward
- Jihad Ward
- John Ward
- Lonnie Warwick
- Dewayne Washington
- Gene Washington
- Harry Washington
- Armon Watts
- Brandon Watts
- Trae Waynes
- Stephen Weatherly
- J'Marcus Webb
- Joe Webb
- Kevin Webster
- Tripp Welborne
- Austin Wentworth
- Carson Wentz
- Charlie West
- Ronnie West
- Dede Westbrook
- Leonard Wheeler
- Danta Whitaker
- Ronyell Whitaker
- Brad White
- Ed White
- James White
- Sammy White
- Benton Whitley
- Jason Whittle
- Jermaine Wiggins
- Solomon Wilcots
- Matt Wile
- Chuck Wiley
- Kenny Willekes
- A. D. Williams
- Ben Williams
- Brian Williams
- Elijah Williams
- Jaylin Williams
- Jeff Williams
- Jimmy Williams
- Joejuan Williams
- Jonah Williams
- Kevin Williams
- Madieu Williams
- Moe Williams
- Pat Williams
- Tank Williams
- Tony Williams
- Walt Williams
- Troy Williamson
- Leonard Willis
- Antonio Wilson
- Brett Wilson
- David Wilson
- Eric Wilson
- Tommy Wilson
- Wade Wilson
- Wayne Wilson
- Antoine Winfield Sr.
- Chuck Winfrey
- Roy Winston
- Phil Wise
- Cory Withrow
- James Wofford
- Craig Wolfley
- Jeff Womack
- Kailee Wong
- D.J. Wonnum
- Mike Wood
- Xavier Woods
- Corey Wootton
- Barry Word
- Shawn Worthen
- Fearon Wright
- Felix Wright
- Jarius Wright
- Jeff Wright
- Kenny Wright
- Nahshon Wright
- Nate Wright
- Ryan Wright
- Ellis Wyms
- Spergon Wynn

== Y ==
- Ray Yakavonis
- Eddie Yarbrough
- Ron Yary
- Max Yates
- Albert Young
- Jim Young
- Rickey Young
- Frank Youso
- Ben Yurosek

== Z ==
- Godfrey Zaunbrecher
- Gary Zimmerman
- Brandon Zylstra
