= 1987 Minnesota Vikings season =

NFL team season

- General manager: Mike Lynn
- Head coach: Jerry Burns
- Offensive coordinator: Bob Schnelker
- Defensive coordinator: Floyd Peters
- Home stadium: Metrodome

Results
- Record: 8–7
- Division place: 2nd NFC Central
- Playoffs: Won Wild Card Playoffs (at Saints) 44–10; Won Divisional Playoffs (at 49ers) 36–24; Lost NFC Championship (at Redskins) 10–17
- All-Pros: S Joey Browner (1st team); T Gary Zimmerman (1st team); DE Chris Doleman (2nd team); DT Keith Millard (2nd team)
- Pro Bowlers: S Joey Browner; WR Anthony Carter; DE Chris Doleman; TE Steve Jordan; LB Scott Studwell; T Gary Zimmerman

Uniform
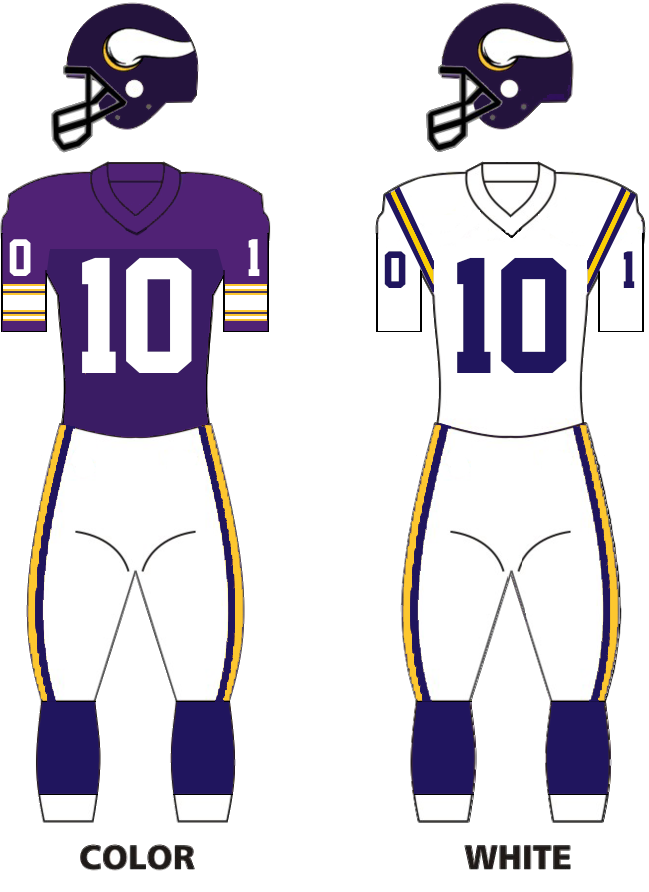

The 1987 season was the Minnesota Vikings' 27th year in the National Football League. A players' strike caused the cancellation of the September 27 game at the Kansas City Chiefs, while the games played on October 4, 11 and 18 were played with replacement players. The Vikings finished with an 8–7 record.

Despite finishing the season only one game over .500, and losing three of their final four games, Minnesota sneaked into the playoffs with the final Wild Card position. There, they won two huge upsets, beating the New Orleans Saints (12–3), and the San Francisco 49ers (13–2) on the road to advance to their first NFC Championship Game in 10 years. The Vikings were unable, however, to defeat the eventual Super Bowl champion Washington Redskins in the NFC Championship Game.

The last remaining active member of the 1987 Minnesota Vikings was quarterback Rich Gannon, who played his final NFL game in the 2004 season, although he missed the 1989 and 1994 seasons.

== Offseason ==
=== 1987 draft ===
Pro Bowler

1987 Minnesota Vikings Draft
Draft order		Player name	Position	College	Notes
Round	Selection	Player name	Position	College	Notes
1	14	D. J. Dozier	Running back	Penn State	From Dolphins (Note: The Vikings traded their first- and fifth-round selections (16th and 128th overall) to the Dolphins in exchange for a first-round selection (14th overall).)
1	16	Traded to the Miami Dolphins			
2	44	Ray Berry	Linebacker	Baylor	
3	72	Henry Thomas	Defensive tackle	LSU	
4	100	Reggie Rutland	Cornerback	Georgia Tech	
5	128	Traded to the Miami Dolphins			
6	156	Greg Richardson	Wide receiver	Alabama	
7	184	Traded to the Seattle Seahawks (Note: The details of this trade are unknown.)			
8	211	Rick Fenney	Running back	Washington	
9	239	Leonard Jones	Defensive back	Texas Tech	
10	267	Bob Riley	Offensive tackle	Indiana State	
11	295	Brent Pease	Quarterback	Montana	
12	323	Keith Williams	Defensive tackle	Florida	

=== Undrafted free agents ===
1987 undrafted free agents of note
Player	Position	College
Don Bramlett	Defensive tackle	Carson–Newman
Dale Dawson	Kicker	Eastern Kentucky
Dana Dimel	Guard	Kansas State

== Staff ==
1987 Minnesota Vikings staff
Front office: President – Wheelock Whitney, Jr.; Executive vice president/general manager – Mike Lynn; Director of football operations – Jerry Reichow; Director of player personnel – Frank Gilliam; Director of pro personnel – Bob Hollway; Head coaches: Head coach – Jerry Burns; Offensive coaches: Offensive coordinator – Bob Schnelker; Running backs – Rollie Dotsch; Interim running backs – John Brunner; Receivers – Dick Rehbein; Offensive line – John Michels	Defensive coaches: Defensive coordinator – Floyd Peters; Defensive line – Paul Wiggin; Linebackers – Monte Kiffin; Secondary – Pete Carroll; Special teams coaches: Special teams/tight ends coach – Tom Batta

== Roster ==
1987 Minnesota Vikings roster
Quarterbacks (QB): 16 Rich Gannon; 9 Tommy Kramer; 11 Wade Wilson; Running backs (RB): 46 Alfred Anderson; 42 D. J. Dozier; 31 Rick Fenney; 20 Darrin Nelson; 36 Allen Rice; Wide receivers (WR): 81 Anthony Carter; 80 Jim Gustafson; 84 Hassan Jones; 87 Leo Lewis; 89 Greg Richardson; Tight ends (TE): 82 Carl Hilton; 83 Steve Jordan; 86 Mike Mularkey	Offensive linemen (OL): 62 Chris Foote C; 72 Dave Huffman G; 76 Tim Irwin T; 68 Greg Koch G; 63 Kirk Lowdermilk C; 71 Mark MacDonald G; 52 Randy Rasmussen C; 65 Gary Zimmerman T; Defensive linemen (DL): 56 Chris Doleman DE; 79 Doug Martin DE; 73 Stafford Mays DT; 75 Keith Millard DT; 96 Tim Newton DT; 95 Gerald Robinson DE; 97 Henry Thomas DT	Linebackers (LB): 53 Sam Anno OLB; 58 Walker Lee Ashley MLB; 50 Ray Berry OLB; 51 David Howard OLB; 57 Chris Martin OLB; 54 Jesse Solomon OLB; 55 Scott Studwell MLB; Defensive backs (DB): 47 Joey Browner SS; 22 Steve Freeman SS; 41 Neal Guggemos CB/S; 44 John Harris FS; 24 Wymon Henderson CB; 30 Issiac Holt CB; 39 Carl Lee CB; 48 Reggie Rutland CB; 40 Wayne Smith CB; Special teams (ST): 8 Greg Coleman P; 1 Chuck Nelson K; 13 Bucky Scribner P	Reserve: -- James Brim WR (IR); 23 Terry Love CB (IR); 77 Mark Mullaney DE (IR); 67 Dennis Swilley C (IR); 66 Terry Tausch G (IR); Rookies in italics Source

=== NFL replacement players ===
After the league decided to use replacement players during the NFLPA strike, the following team was assembled:

1987 Minnesota Vikings replacement roster
Quarterbacks: 7 Tony Adams; 5 Larry Miller; Running backs: 37 Phil Frye; 36 Sam Harrell; 32 Steve Harris; 45 Leonard Moore; 43 Jimmy Smith; 35 Andre Thomas; 49 Adam Walker; 33 Jeff Womack; Wide receivers: 84 Jim Brim; 86 Larry Brown; 82 Ron Daugherty; 85 Steve Finch; 86 Willie Gillespie; 80 Keith Kidd; 80 Terry LeCount; 81 Rickey Parks; Tight ends: 87 Clifton Eley; 88 Marc May; 89 Ed Schenk	Offensive linemen: 71 Derek Burton T; 64 Mark Hanson G; 74 Mike McCurry G; 64 Ted Million G; 69 Frank Ori G; 78 John Scardina T; 60 Ron Selesky C; 61 Mike Turner G; 68 Kevin Webster G; Defensive linemen: 95 Don Bramlett DT; 91 Dan Coleman DE; 98 Phil Micech DE; 90 Fred Molden DT; 97 Tony Norman DE; 63 Kurt Ploeger DE/DT; 73 Joe Stepanek DT; 62 Brad White DT	Linebackers: 53 Steve Ache; 94 Tim Bryant; 59 Fabray Collins; 52 Jim Dick; 92 Kelly Quinn; 50 Randy Scott; Defensive backs: 21 Rufus Bess; 29 Jamie Fitzgerald; 38 Fletcher Louallen; 23 Terry Love; 28 Ted Rosnagle; 35 Mike Slaton; 34 Timothy Starks; 27 John Turner; Special teams: 13 Dave Bruno P; 4 Dale Dawson K; 13 Bucky Scribner P

== Preseason ==
Week	Date	Opponent	Result	Record	Venue	Attendance
1	August 15	at New Orleans Saints	L 17–23	0–1	Louisiana Superdome	52,884
2	August 22	Indianapolis Colts	W 37–13	1–1	Hubert H. Humphrey Metrodome	49,304
3	August 29	New England Patriots	L 27–38	1–2	Hubert H. Humphrey Metrodome	49,339
4	September 3	at Denver Broncos	W 27–17	2–2	Mile High Stadium	74,081

== Regular season ==
=== Schedule ===
Week	Date	Opponent	Result	Record	Venue	Attendance
1	September 13	**Detroit Lions**	**W** 34–19	1–0	Hubert H. Humphrey Metrodome	57,061
2	September 20	at Los Angeles Rams	**W** 21–16	2–0	Anaheim Stadium	63,367
3	September 27	at Kansas City Chiefs	canceled	2–0	Arrowhead Stadium	
4	October 4	**Green Bay Packers**	**L** 16–23	2–1	Hubert H. Humphrey Metrodome	13,911
5	October 11	at **Chicago Bears**	**L** 7–27	2–2	Soldier Field	32,113
6	October 18	at **Tampa Bay Buccaneers**	**L** 10–20	2–3	Tampa Stadium	20,850
7	October 26	Denver Broncos	**W** 34–27	3–3	Hubert H. Humphrey Metrodome	51,011
8	November 1	at Seattle Seahawks	**L** 17–28	3–4	Kingdome	61,134
9	November 8	Los Angeles Raiders	**W** 31–20	4–4	Hubert H. Humphrey Metrodome	57,150
10	November 15	**Tampa Bay Buccaneers**	**W** 23–17	5–4	Hubert H. Humphrey Metrodome	48,605
11	November 22	Atlanta Falcons	**W** 24–13	6–4	Hubert H. Humphrey Metrodome	53,866
12	November 26	at Dallas Cowboys	**W** 44–38 (OT)	7–4	Texas Stadium	54,229
13	December 6	**Chicago Bears**	**L** 24–30	7–5	Hubert H. Humphrey Metrodome	62,331
14	December 13	at **Green Bay Packers**	**L** 10–16	7–6	Milwaukee County Stadium	47,059
15	December 20	at **Detroit Lions**	**W** 17–14	8–6	Pontiac Silverdome	27,693
16	December 26	Washington Redskins	**L** 24–27 (OT)	8–7	Hubert H. Humphrey Metrodome	59,160

Notes:

- Intra-division opponents are in **bold** text.
- The October 18 game against Tampa Bay was originally scheduled to be played in Minneapolis. The game was switched with the November 15 game due to Game 2 of the World Series. The game against the Broncos, originally scheduled for October 25, was pushed back to Monday because the Metrodome was being used for Game 7 of the World Series.

=== Game summaries ===
==== Week 9 vs. Los Angeles Raiders ====
External videos
- 1987 Los Angeles Raiders at Minnesota Vikings – Game highlights

==== Week 10: vs. Tampa Bay Buccaneers ====
Week 9: Tampa Bay Buccaneers at Minnesota Vikings – Game summary

Quarter	1	2	3	4	Total
Buccaneers	0	7	3	7	**17**
**Vikings**	0	6	10	7	**23**

at Hubert H. Humphrey Metrodome, Minneapolis, Minnesota

- Date: November 15
- Game time: 12:00 p.m.
- Game weather: None (indoor stadium)
- Game attendance: 48,605
- Referee: Fred Wyant
- TV announcers (CBS): James Brown and Dan Jiggetts
- Game Book

Game information

**First quarter**

- No scoring plays.

**Second quarter**

- TB – Calvin Magee 20-yard pass from Steve DeBerg (Donald Igwebuike kick), 11:02. Buccaneers 7–0. **Drive: 9 plays, 80 yards.**
- MIN – Chuck Nelson 29-yard field goal, 6:58. Buccaneers 7–3. **Drive: 12 plays, 53 yards.**
- MIN – Chuck Nelson 27-yard field goal, 0:11. Buccaneers 7–6. **Drive: 6 plays, 20 yards.**

**Third quarter**

- MIN – Rick Fenney 1-yard run (Chuck Nelson kick), 10:58. Vikings 13–7. **Drive: 10 plays, 74 yards.**
- TB – Donald Igwebuike 26-yard field goal, 6:54. Vikings 13–10. **Drive: 4 plays, 6 yards.**
- MIN – Chuck Nelson 26-yard field goal, 0:03. Vikings 16–10. **Drive: 10 plays, 47 yards.**

**Fourth quarter**

- MIN – Steve Jordan 2-yard pass from Tommy Kramer (Chuck Nelson kick), 10:56. Vikings 23–10. **Drive: 2 plays, 8 yards.**
- TB – Phil Freeman 64-yard pass from Steve DeBerg (Donald Igwebuike kick), 7:55. Vikings 23–17. **Drive: 5 plays, 73 yards.**

**Top passers**

- TB – Steve DeBerg – 22/37, 284 yards, 2 TD, INT
- MIN – Wade Wilson – 8/19, 97 yards

**Top rushers**

- TB – Jeff Smith – 8 rushes, 16 yards
- MIN – Darrin Nelson – 17 rushes, 103 yards

**Top receivers**

- TB – Phil Freeman – 2 receptions, 76 yards, TD
- MIN – Anthony Carter – 3 receptions, 37 yards

==== Week 12: at Dallas Cowboys ====
Week 11: Minnesota Vikings at Dallas Cowboys – Game summary

Quarter	1	2	3	4	OT	Total
**Vikings**	14	7	7	10	6	**44**
Cowboys	0	14	10	14	0	**38**

at Texas Stadium, Irving, Texas

- Date: November 26
- Game time: 3:00 p.m. CST
- Game weather: 48 °F (9 °C)
- Referee: Fred Silva
- TV announcers (CBS): Pat Summerall and John Madden
- Pro-Football-Reference.com

Game information

**First quarter**

- MIN – Anthony Carter 11-yard pass from Tommy Kramer (Chuck Nelson kick). Vikings 7–0.
- MIN – Tommy Kramer 1-yard run (Chuck Nelson kick). Vikings 14–0.

**Second quarter**

- DAL – Danny White 1-yard run (Roger Ruzek kick). Vikings 14–7.
- DAL – Herschel Walker 3-yard pass from Danny White (Roger Ruzek kick). Tied 14–14.
- MIN – Anthony Carter 37-yard pass from Tommy Kramer (Chuck Nelson kick). Vikings 21–14.

**Third quarter**

- MIN – Darrin Nelson 52-yard run (Chuck Nelson kick). Vikings 28–14.
- DAL – Roger Ruzek 38-yard field goal. Vikings 28–17.
- DAL – Mike Renfro 8-yard pass from Danny White (Roger Ruzek kick). Vikings 28–24.

**Fourth quarter**

- MIN – Chuck Nelson 33-yard field goal. Vikings 31–24.
- MIN – Rick Fenney 1-yard run (Chuck Nelson kick). Vikings 38–24.
- DAL – Mike Renfro 14-yard pass from Danny White (Roger Ruzek kick). Vikings 38–31.
- DAL – Mike Renfro 18-yard pass from Danny White (Roger Ruzek kick). Tie 38–38.

**Overtime**

- MIN – Darrin Nelson 24-yard run. Vikings 44–38.

**Top passers**

- MIN – Wade Wilson – 9/18, 189 yards, INT
- DAL – Danny White – 25/41, 341 yards, 4 TD, 3 INT

**Top rushers**

- MIN – Darrin Nelson – 16 rushes, 118 yards, 2 TD
- DAL – Herschel Walker – 21 rushes, 76 yards

**Top receivers**

- MIN – Anthony Carter – 8 receptions, 184 yards, 2 TD
- DAL – Mike Renfro – 7 receptions, 100 yards, 3 TD

In the Vikings' first game on Thanksgiving in 18 years, starting quarterback Tommy Kramer helped the team to a 14–0 lead by the end of the first quarter, opening with an 11-yard strike to Anthony Carter, before taking the ball in himself from a yard out. However, a bruised throwing arm meant he had to leave the game. Wade Wilson then took over. The Cowboys tied it up with two touchdowns of their own in the second quarter, but another throw from Kramer to Carter, this time from 37 yards, meant the Vikings took a seven-point lead into halftime. Darrin Nelson extended the Vikings' lead with the opening score of the second half, running 52 yards for the Vikings' fourth touchdown of the game. A field goal and another touchdown for the Cowboys reduced the Vikings' lead to four points going into the final quarter, but they restored the two-score margin with a field goal from Chuck Nelson and a 1-yard run from Rick Fenney. The Cowboys managed to come back and tie the game with just over two minutes left to play, enough time for the Vikings to drive downfield and set up a potential game-winning, 46-yard field goal attempt for Chuck Nelson with nine seconds left. He missed the kick and the game went to overtime. Both teams failed with their first two possessions, with both throwing interceptions. Vikings linebacker Scott Studwell returned his interception to the Minnesota 40-yard line to begin their third drive of the extra period. They opened with four straight run plays, including a fourth-down conversion to get them to midfield, followed by a 24-yard pass from Wilson to Carter, before Darrin Nelson ran the remaining distance for the walk-off game-winning touchdown. The result brought the Vikings to a 7–4 record with four games left to play.

=== Standings ===
NFC Central
	W	L	T	PCT	DIV	CONF	PF	PA	STK
Chicago Bears^{(2)}	11	4	0	.733	7–0	9–2	356	282	W1
Minnesota Vikings^{(5)}	8	7	0	.533	3–5	6–6	336	335	L1
Green Bay Packers	5	9	1	.367	3–4	4–7	255	300	L2
Tampa Bay Buccaneers	4	11	0	.267	3–4	4–9	286	360	L8
Detroit Lions	4	11	0	.267	2–5	4–7	269	384	W1

== Postseason ==
=== Schedule ===
Round	Date	Opponent (seed)	Result	Record	Venue
Wild Card	January 3, 1988	at New Orleans Saints (4)	W 44–10	1–0	Louisiana Superdome
Divisional	January 9, 1988	at San Francisco 49ers (1)	W 36–24	2–0	Candlestick Park
NFC Championship	January 17, 1988	at Washington Redskins (3)	L 10–17	2–1	Robert F. Kennedy Memorial Stadium

=== Game summaries ===
==== NFC Wild Card Playoffs: at (#4) New Orleans Saints ====
NFC Wild Card Playoffs: (#5) Minnesota Vikings at (#4) New Orleans Saints – Game summary

Quarter	1	2	3	4	Total
Vikings	10	21	3	10	44
Saints	7	3	0	0	10

at Louisiana Superdome, New Orleans, Louisiana

- Date: January 3, 1988
- Game time: 12:30 p.m. EST/11:30 a.m. CST
- Game attendance: 68,546
- Referee: Tom Dooley
- TV announcers (CBS): Pat Summerall and John Madden
- Pro-Football-Reference

Game information

First quarter

- NO – Eric Martin 10-yard pass from Bobby Hebert (Morten Andersen kick). Saints 7–0.
- MIN – Chuck Nelson 42-yard field goal. Saints 7–3.
- MIN – Anthony Carter 84-yard punt return (Chuck Nelson kick). Vikings 10–7.

Second quarter

- MIN – Steve Jordan 5-yard pass from Wade Wilson (Chuck Nelson kick). Vikings 17–7.
- MIN – Anthony Carter 10-yard pass from Allen Rice (Chuck Nelson kick). Vikings 24–7.
- NO – Morten Andersen 40-yard field goal. Vikings 24–10.
- MIN – Hassan Jones 44-yard pass from Wade Wilson (Chuck Nelson kick). Vikings 31–10.

Third quarter

- MIN – Chuck Nelson 42-yard field goal. Vikings 34–10.

Fourth quarter

- MIN – Chuck Nelson 19-yard field goal. Vikings 37–10.
- MIN – D. J. Dozier 18-yard run (Chuck Nelson kick). Vikings 44–10.

Top passers

- MIN – Wade Wilson – 11/20, 189 yards, 2 TD
- NO – Bobby Hebert – 9/19, 84 yards, TD, 2 INT

Top rushers

- MIN – Darrin Nelson – 17 rushes, 73 yards
- NO – Dalton Hilliard – 8 rushes, 39 yards

Top receivers

- MIN – Anthony Carter – 6 receptions, 79 yards, TD
- NO – Hoby Brenner – 2 receptions, 33 yards

In the Saints' first playoff game in history, the Vikings dominated the game by recording two sacks, forcing four turnovers and allowing only 149 yards. The 34-point margin of victory stands as the most lopsided win by an NFC team in a Wild Card round game in NFL history.

==== NFC Divisional Playoffs: at (#1) San Francisco 49ers ====
NFC Divisional Playoffs: (#5) Minnesota Vikings at (#1) San Francisco 49ers – Game summary

Quarter	1	2	3	4	Total
Vikings	3	17	10	6	36
49ers	3	0	14	7	24

at Candlestick Park, San Francisco

- Date: January 9, 1988
- Game time: 4:00 p.m. EST/1:00 p.m. PST
- Game attendance: 63,008
- Referee: Gene Barth
- TV announcers (CBS): Tim Ryan and Joe Theismann
- Pro-Football-Reference

Game information

First quarter

- MIN – Chuck Nelson 21-yard field goal. Vikings 3–0.
- SF – Ray Wersching 43-yard field goal. Tied 3–3.

Second quarter

- MIN – Carl Hilton 7-yard pass from Wade Wilson (Chuck Nelson kick). Vikings 10–3.
- MIN – Chuck Nelson 23-yard field goal. Vikings 13–3.
- MIN – Najee Mustafaa 45-yard interception return (Chuck Nelson kick). Vikings 20–3.

Third quarter

- SF – Jeff Fuller 48-yard interception return (Ray Wersching kick). Vikings 20–10.
- MIN – Hassan Jones 5-yard pass from Wade Wilson (Chuck Nelson kick). Vikings 27–10.
- SF – Steve Young 5-yard run (Ray Wersching kick). Vikings 27–17.
- MIN – Chuck Nelson 40-yard field goal. Vikings 30–17.

Fourth quarter

- MIN – Chuck Nelson 40-yard field goal. Vikings 33–17.
- SF – John Frank 16-yard pass from Steve Young (Ray Wersching kick). Vikings 33–24.
- MIN – Chuck Nelson 23-yard field goal. Vikings 36–24.

Top passers

- MIN – Wade Wilson – 20/34, 298 yards, 2 TD, INT
- SF – Steve Young – 12/17, 158 yards, TD, INT

Top rushers

- MIN – Darrin Nelson – 11 rushes, 42 yards
- SF – Steve Young – 6 rushes, 72 yards, TD

Top receivers

- MIN – Anthony Carter – 10 receptions, 227 yards
- SF – Roger Craig – 9 receptions, 78 yards

The heavy underdog Vikings pulled off a shocker in San Francisco, controlling most of the game with Anthony Carter leading the way with 227 receiving yards.

==== NFC Championship Game: at (#3) Washington Redskins ====
NFC Championship Game: (#5) Minnesota Vikings at (#3) Washington Redskins – Game summary

Quarter	1	2	3	4	Total
Vikings	0	7	0	3	10
Redskins	7	0	3	7	17

at RFK Stadium, Washington, D.C.

- Date: January 17, 1988
- Game time: 12:30 p.m. EST
- Game attendance: 55,212
- Referee: Ben Dreith
- TV announcers (CBS): Pat Summerall and John Madden

Game information

First quarter

- WAS – Kelvin Bryant 42-yard pass from Doug Williams (Ali Haji-Sheikh kick). Redskins 7–0.

Second quarter

- MIN – Leo Lewis 23-yard pass from Wade Wilson (Chuck Nelson kick). Tied 7–7.

Third quarter

- WAS – Ali Haji-Sheikh 28-yard field goal. Redskins 10–7.

Fourth quarter

- MIN – Chuck Nelson 18-yard field goal. Tied 10–10.
- WAS – Gary Clark 7-yard pass from Doug Williams (Ali Haji-Sheikh kick). Redskins 17–10.

Top passers

- MIN – Wade Wilson – 19/39, 243 yards, TD, INT
- WAS – Doug Williams – 9/26, 119 yards, 2 TD

Top rushers

- MIN – Wade Wilson – 4 rushes, 28 yards
- WAS – Timmy Smith – 13 rushes, 72 yards

Top receivers

- MIN – Anthony Carter – 7 receptions, 85 yards
- WAS – Gary Clark – 3 receptions, 57 yards, TD

In a defensive battle, the Redskins played a little better by limiting the Vikings to only 76 rushing yards and forcing eight sacks. Washington scored first on a 98-yard drive that was capped by running back Kelvin Bryant's 42-yard touchdown reception from quarterback Doug Williams. However, Minnesota tied the game before halftime with quarterback Wade Wilson's 23-yard touchdown pass to Leo Lewis. In the third quarter, Redskins linebacker Mel Kaufman returned an interception 10 yards to the Minnesota 17-yard line to set up kicker Ali Haji-Sheikh's 28-yard field goal. In the final period, Vikings kicker Chuck Nelson made an 18-yard field goal to tie the game, 10–10. The Redskins then marched 70 yards to score on Williams' 7-yard touchdown pass to wide receiver Gary Clark to take the lead, 17–10, with 5:06 remaining in the game. Minnesota then advanced to the Washington 6-yard line, but Wilson's fourth down pass, intended for running back Darrin Nelson in the end zone was defended by Darrell Green with 52 seconds remaining and the Redskins ran out the clock.

== Statistics ==
=== Team leaders ===
Category	Player(s)	Value
Passing yards	Wade Wilson	2,106
Passing touchdowns	Wade Wilson	14
Rushing yards	Darrin Nelson	642
Rushing touchdowns	D.J. Dozier; Wade Wilson	5
Receiving yards	Anthony Carter	922
Receiving touchdowns	Anthony Carter	7
Points	Chuck Nelson	75
Kickoff return yards	Neal Guggemos	808
Punt return yards	Leo Lewis	275
Tackles	Jesse Solomon	126
Sacks	Chris Doleman	11.0
Interceptions	Joey Browner	6
Forced fumbles	Chris Doleman	6

=== League rankings ===
Category	Total yards	Yards per game	NFL rank (out of 28)
Passing offense	2,826	176.6	20th
Rushing offense	1,983	123.9	11th
Total offense	4,809	300.6	15th
Passing defense	3,100	193.8	16th
Rushing defense	1,724	107.8	11th
Total defense	4,824	301.8	10th
