= 1990 Minnesota Vikings season =

NFL team season

- General manager: Mike Lynn
- Head coach: Jerry Burns
- Home stadium: Metrodome

Results
- Record: 6–10
- Division place: 5th NFC Central
- Playoffs: Did not qualify
- All-Pros: S Joey Browner (1st team); G Randall McDaniel (1st team)
- Pro Bowlers: S Joey Browner; DE Chris Doleman; TE Steve Jordan; CB Carl Lee; G Randall McDaniel

Uniform
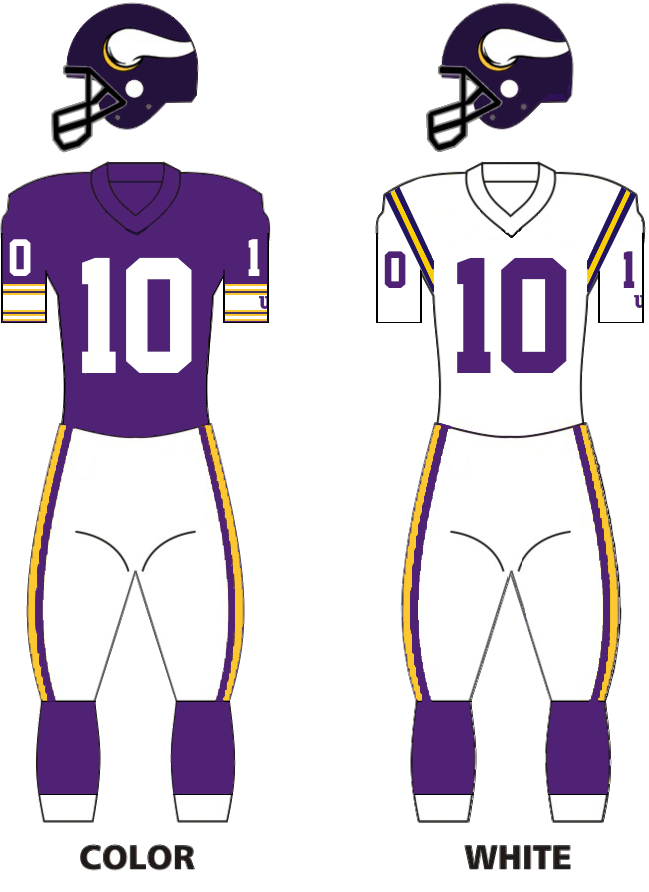

The 1990 season was the Minnesota Vikings' 30th in the National Football League. Under head coach Jerry Burns, they finished with a 6–10 record and missed the playoffs for the first time since 1986. The Vikings went 1–6 through their first seven games, including a five-game losing streak. They then won their next five (including a 41–13 win over the eventual NFC Central champion Chicago Bears in Week 12) to get back to 6–6 and give themselves a shot at a wild card spot in the playoffs; however, the Vikings lost their final four games to finish at 6–10. While their overall record was tied with three other teams in the division, the Vikings' 4–8 record against fellow NFC teams meant they finished bottom of the NFC Central. It was the first time since 1984 Minnesota finished last in the division, and the second since 1968.

Notable additions to the team this season were wide receiver Cris Carter, and undrafted defensive lineman John Randle, both of whom went on to have Hall of Fame careers.

Injuries to the defense and a lackluster season from Herschel Walker were the story of the team's season.

== Offseason ==
=== 1990 draft ===
Pro Bowler

1990 Minnesota Vikings Draft
Draft order		Player name	Position	College	Notes
Round	Selection	Player name	Position	College	Notes
1	21	Traded to the Dallas Cowboys (Note: These picks were involved in the Herschel Walker trade on October 12, 1989.)			
2	47	Traded to the Dallas Cowboys			
3	54	Mike Jones	Tight end	Texas A&M	From Cowboys
3	74	Marion Hobby	Defensive end	Tennessee	
4	104	Alonzo Hampton	Defensive back	Pittsburgh	
5	116	Reggie Thornton	Wide receiver	Bowling Green	From Chargers, via Cowboys
5	131	Cedric Smith	Fullback	Florida	
6	158	Traded to the Dallas Cowboys			
7	188	John Levelis	Linebacker	C. W. Post	
8	214	Craig Schlichting	Defensive end	Wyoming	
9	241	Terry Allen	Running back	Clemson	
10	249	Pat Newman	Wide receiver	Utah State	From Cowboys
10	271	Donald Smith	Defensive back	Liberty	
11	298	Traded to the Los Angeles Raiders (Note: The Vikings traded their 11th-round selection (298th overall) to the Rams in exchange for a 1989 12th-round selection (335th overall).)			
12	324	Ron Goetz	Linebacker	Minnesota	

=== Undrafted free agents ===
1990 undrafted free agents of note
Player	Position	College
Pat Eilers	Safety	Notre Dame
Tim Peterson	Quarterback	Wisconsin–Stout
John Randle	Defensive tackle	Texas A&M–Kingsville

== Staff ==
1990 Minnesota Vikings staff
Front office: President – Wheelock Whitney, Jr.; General manager – Mike Lynn; Administrative assistant to the head coach – Marc Trestman; Head coaches: Head coach – Jerry Burns; Assistant head coach/offense – Tom Moore; Offensive coaches: Offensive coordinator – Bob Schnelker; Assistant offensive coordinator/passing game – Dick Rehbein; Running backs – John Brunner; Offensive line – John Michels	Defensive coaches: Defensive coordinator – Floyd Peters; Defensive line – Paul Wiggin; Linebackers – Maxie Baughan; Defensive backs – Jerry Brown; Special teams coaches: Special teams/tight ends – Tom Batta

== Roster ==
1990 Minnesota Vikings roster
Quarterbacks (QB): 16 Rich Gannon; 12 Sean Salisbury; Running backs (RB): 46 Alfred Anderson FB; 42 D. J. Dozier; 30 Cedric Smith FB; 34 Herschel Walker KR; Wide receivers (WR): 81 Anthony Carter; 80 Cris Carter; 84 Hassan Jones; 87 Leo Lewis PR; 89 Pat Newman; Tight ends (TE): 82 Mike Jones; 83 Steve Jordan; 85 Brent Novoselsky	Offensive linemen (OL): 62 Chris Foote C; 74 Brian Habib G/T; 77 Dave Huffman G; 76 Tim Irwin T; 69 Todd Kalis G; 63 Kirk Lowdermilk C; 64 Randall McDaniel G; 73 Craig Wolfley G; 65 Gary Zimmerman T; Defensive linemen (DL): 71 Ken Clarke DT; 56 Chris Doleman DE; 99 Al Noga DE; 93 John Randle DE; 94 Thomas Strauthers DE; 97 Henry Thomas DT	Linebackers (LB): 50 Ray Berry; 59 Mark Dusbabek OLB; 57 Mike Merriweather OLB; 55 Scott Studwell MLB; 58 Jimmy Williams OLB; Defensive backs (DB): 44 Michael Brim FS; 47 Joey Browner SS; 24 Pat Eilers SS; 29 Darrell Fullington FS; 25 Alonzo Hampton CB; 39 Carl Lee CB; 26 Audray McMillian CB; 48 Reggie Rutland CB; 27 Ken Stills FS; Special teams (ST): 18 Harry Newsome P; 7 Fuad Reveiz K; 60 Adam Schreiber LS	Practice squad: -- Tony Moss WR; Reserve: 21 Terry Allen RB (IR); 31 Rick Fenney FB (IR); -- Chris Gaiters WR (IR); -- Jim Gustafson WR (IR); 75 Keith Millard DT (IR); 36 Allen Rice (IR); 11 Wade Wilson QB (IR); Rookies in italics 46 active, 7 reserve, 1 practice squad

== Preseason ==
Week	Date	Opponent	Result	Record	Venue	Attendance
1	August 11	New Orleans Saints	L 10–13	0–1	Hubert H. Humphrey Metrodome	48,154
2	August 19	at Cleveland Browns	W 23–20	1–1	Cleveland Stadium	60,989
3	August 26	Houston Oilers	W 22–21	2–1	Hubert H. Humphrey Metrodome	46,191
4	August 31	at Miami Dolphins	W 20–17	3–1	Joe Robbie Stadium	44,689

== Regular season ==
=== Schedule ===
Week	Date	Opponent	Result	Record	Venue	Attendance
1	September 9	at Kansas City Chiefs	L 21–24	0–1	Arrowhead Stadium	68,363
2	September 16	New Orleans Saints	W 32–3	1–1	Hubert H. Humphrey Metrodome	56,272
3	September 23	at Chicago Bears	L 16–19	1–2	Soldier Field	65,420
4	September 30	Tampa Bay Buccaneers	L 20–23 (OT)	1–3	Hubert H. Humphrey Metrodome	54,462
5	October 7	Detroit Lions	L 27–34	1–4	Hubert H. Humphrey Metrodome	57,586
6	October 15	at Philadelphia Eagles	L 24–32	1–5	Veterans Stadium	66,296
7	Bye					
8	October 28	at Green Bay Packers	L 10–24	1–6	Milwaukee County Stadium	55,125
9	November 4	Denver Broncos	W 27–22	2–6	Hubert H. Humphrey Metrodome	57,331
10	November 11	at Detroit Lions	W 17–7	3–6	Silverdome	68,264
11	November 18	at Seattle Seahawks	W 24–21	4–6	Kingdome	59,735
12	November 25	Chicago Bears	W 41–13	5–6	Hubert H. Humphrey Metrodome	58,866
13	December 2	Green Bay Packers	W 23–7	6–6	Hubert H. Humphrey Metrodome	62,058
14	December 9	at New York Giants	L 15–23	6–7	Giants Stadium	76,121
15	December 16	at Tampa Bay Buccaneers	L 13–26	6–8	Tampa Stadium	47,272
16	December 22	Los Angeles Raiders	L 24–28	6–9	Hubert H. Humphrey Metrodome	53,899
17	December 30	San Francisco 49ers	L 17–20	6–10	Hubert H. Humphrey Metrodome	51,590

=== Game summaries ===
==== Week 1: at Kansas City Chiefs ====
Week 1: Minnesota Vikings at Kansas City Chiefs – Game summary

Quarter	1	2	3	4	Total
Vikings	7	7	7	0	21
Chiefs	14	3	0	7	24

at Arrowhead Stadium, Kansas City, Missouri

- Date: September 9
- Game time: 12:00 p.m. CDT
- Game weather: Clear, 89 °F (32 °C)
- Game attendance: 68,363
- Referee: Howard Roe
- TV announcers (CBS): James Brown and Randy Cross
- Recap, Game Book

Game information

First quarter

- KC – Bill Jones 4-yard pass Steve DeBerg (Nick Lowery kick), 11:43. Chiefs 7–0. Drive: 4 plays, 14 yards, 2:21.
- KC – Todd McNair 22-yard pass Steve DeBerg (Nick Lowery kick), 8:31. Chiefs 14–0. Drive: 3 plays, 29 yards, 1:28.
- MIN – Herschel Walker 6-yard pass Wade Wilson (Donald Igwebuike kick), 3:11. Chiefs 14–7. Drive: 9 plays, 76 yards, 5:20.

Second quarter

- MIN – Steve Jordan 26-yard pass Wade Wilson (Donald Igwebuike kick), 8:20. Tied 14–14. Drive: 7 plays, 78 yards, 3:52.
- KC – Nick Lowery 43-yard field goal, 0:00. Chiefs 17–14. Drive: 9 plays, 50 yards, 1:41.

Third quarter

- MIN – Herschel Walker 8-yard pass Wade Wilson (Donald Igwebuike kick), 6:53. Vikings 21–17. Drive: 12 plays, 89 yards, 6:10.

Fourth quarter

- KC – Christian Okoye 2-yard run (Nick Lowery kick), 9:35. Chiefs 24–21. Drive: 12 plays, 78 yards, 5:32.

Top passers

- MIN – Wade Wilson – 18/36, 248 yards, 3 TD, INT
- KC – Steve DeBerg – 16/28, 196 yards, 2 TD

Top rushers

- MIN – Herschel Walker – 14 rushes, 68 yards
- KC – Christian Okoye – 28 rushes, 92 yards, TD

Top receivers

- MIN – Steve Jordan – 4 receptions, 90 yards, TD
- KC – Todd McNair – 6 receptions, 57 yards, TD

=== Standings ===
NFC Central
	W	L	T	PCT	DIV	CONF	PF	PA	STK
^{(3)} Chicago Bears	11	5	0	.688	6–2	9–3	348	280	L1
Tampa Bay Buccaneers	6	10	0	.375	5–3	6–8	264	367	L2
Detroit Lions	6	10	0	.375	3–5	5–7	373	413	L1
Green Bay Packers	6	10	0	.375	3–5	5–7	271	347	L5
Minnesota Vikings	6	10	0	.375	3–5	4–8	351	326	L4

== Statistics ==
=== Team leaders ===
Category	Player(s)	Value
Passing yards	Rich Gannon	2,278
Passing touchdowns	Rich Gannon	16
Rushing yards	Herschel Walker	770
Rushing touchdowns	Herschel Walker	5
Receiving yards	Anthony Carter	1,008
Receiving touchdowns	Anthony Carter	8
Points	Donald Igwebuike	61
Kickoff return yards	Herschel Walker	966
Punt return yards	Leo Lewis	180
Tackles	Henry Thomas	109
Sacks	Chris Doleman	11.0
Interceptions	Joey Browner	7
Forced fumbles	Chris Doleman	4

=== League rankings ===
Category	Total yards	Yards per game	NFL rank (out of 28)
Passing offense	3,167	197.9	11th
Rushing offense	1,867	116.7	15th
Total offense	5,034	314.6	12th
Passing defense	2,643	165.2	3rd
Rushing defense	2,074	129.6	21st
Total defense	4,717	294.8	13th

== Awards and honors ==
- Randall McDaniel, NFC Pro Bowl selection
- Randall McDaniel, All-Pro selection by Associated Press
- Randall McDaniel, All-NFC selection by UPI
