= 1989 Minnesota Vikings season =

NFL team season

- General manager: Mike Lynn
- Head coach: Jerry Burns
- Offensive coordinator: Bob Schnelker
- Defensive coordinator: Floyd Peters
- Home stadium: Metrodome

Results
- Record: 10–6
- Division place: 1st NFC Central
- Playoffs: Lost Divisional Playoffs (at 49ers) 13–41
- All-Pros: DE Chris Doleman (1st team); DT Keith Millard (1st team); S Joey Browner (2nd team)
- Pro Bowlers: S Joey Browner; WR Anthony Carter; DE Chris Doleman; TE Steve Jordan; CB Carl Lee; G Randall McDaniel; T Gary Zimmerman

Uniform
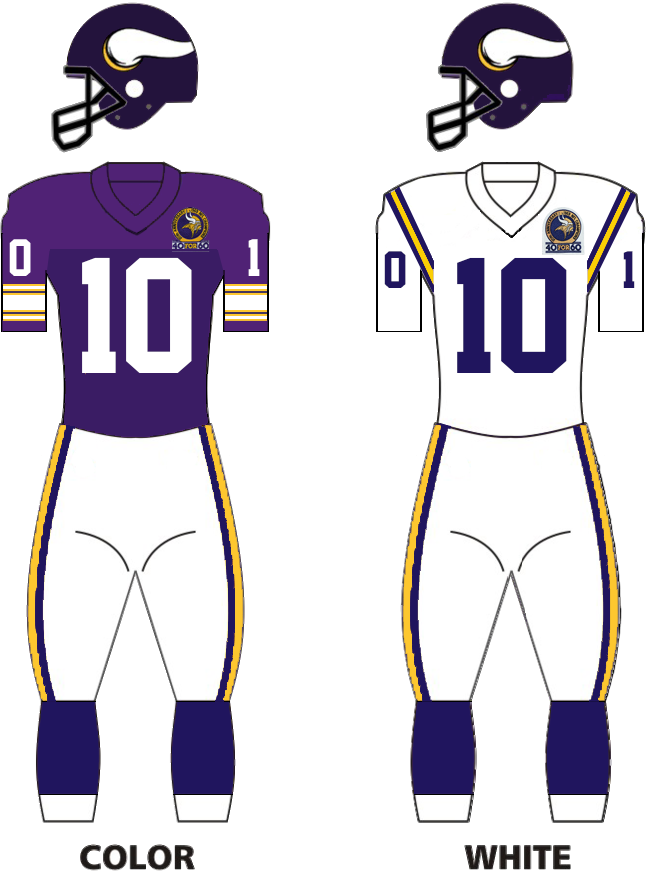

The 1989 season was the Minnesota Vikings' 29th in the National Football League (NFL). They finished with a 10–6 record to win the NFC Central Division. This title was secured during one of what is considered by many to be among the most exciting Monday Night Football contests ever: a Christmas Day victory over the Cincinnati Bengals at home, at the Hubert H. Humphrey Metrodome, which was the de facto first playoff game of the year. The Vikings were beaten 41–13 in the divisional round of the playoffs by the eventual Super Bowl champion San Francisco 49ers.

This season was also notable for the number of sacks the defense recorded: 71 overall, with 39 coming from only two players (Chris Doleman and Keith Millard). Millard was named the Defensive Player of the Year after putting up record numbers by a defensive tackle.

== Offseason ==
=== 1989 draft ===
1989 Minnesota Vikings Draft
Draft order		Player name	Position	College	Notes
Round	Selection	Player name	Position	College	Notes
1	24	Traded to the Pittsburgh Steelers (Note: The Vikings traded their first-round selection (24th overall) to the Steelers in exchange for LB Mike Merriweather.)			
2	52	David Braxton	Linebacker	Wake Forest	
3	80	John Hunter	Offensive tackle	BYU	
4	108	Darryl Ingram	Tight end	California	
5	136	Pick forfeited during 1988 supplemental draft (Note: The Vikings forfeited their fifth-round selection (136th overall) after selecting DB Ryan Bethea in the fifth round of the 1988 NFL supplemental draft.)			
6	163	Jeff Mickel	Offensive tackle	Eastern Washington	
7	191	Benji Roland	Defensive end	Auburn	
8	219	Alex Stewart	Defensive end	Cal State Fullerton	
9	247	Traded to the New England Patriots (Note: The Vikings traded their ninth-round selection (247th overall) to the Patriots in exchange for a 1988 11th-round selection (296th overall).)			
10	275	Traded to the Miami Dolphins (Note: The Vikings traded their 10th-round selection (275th overall) to the Dolphins in exchange for OT Greg Koch.)			
11	303	Brad Baxter	Running back	Alabama State	
12	331	Shawn Woodson	Linebacker	James Madison	
12	335	Everett Ross	Wide receiver	Ohio State	From 49ers, via Raiders (Note: The Vikings traded their 1990 11th-round selection to the Raiders in exchange for the 12th-round selection the Raiders received from the 49ers.)

=== Undrafted free agents ===
1989 undrafted free agents of note
Player	Position	College
Pat Beaty	Kicker	North Dakota
Robert Carter	Running back	Troy State
Jarrod Delaney	Wide receiver	TCU
Darrell Ellison	Linebacker	Tulsa
Devin Harberts	Wide receiver	Iowa
Ken Johnson	Defensive back	Florida A&M
Andy Keeler	Guard	Nebraska
Tony Peterson	Quarterback	Marshall
Everett Ross	Wide receiver	Ohio State
Pat Thompson	Punter	BYU

== Staff ==
1989 Minnesota Vikings staff
Front office: President – Wheelock Whitney, Jr.; General manager – Mike Lynn; Head coaches: Head coach – Jerry Burns; Offensive coaches: Offensive coordinator – Bob Schnelker; Assistant offensive coordinator/passing game – Dick Rehbein; Running backs – John Brunner; Wide receivers – Jerry Brown; Offensive line – John Michels	Defensive coaches: Defensive coordinator – Floyd Peters; Defensive line – Paul Wiggin; Linebackers – Monte Kiffin; Defensive backs – Pete Carroll; Special teams coaches: Special teams/tight ends – Tom Batta

== Roster ==
1989 Minnesota Vikings roster
Quarterbacks (QB): 16 Rich Gannon; 9 Tommy Kramer; 11 Wade Wilson; Running backs (RB): 46 Alfred Anderson FB; 33 Jessie Clark; 42 D. J. Dozier KR; 31 Rick Fenney FB; 34 Herschel Walker KR; Wide receivers (WR): 81 Anthony Carter; 80 Jim Gustafson; 84 Hassan Jones; 87 Leo Lewis PR; Tight ends (TE): 86 Darryl Ingram; 83 Steve Jordan; 85 Brent Novoselsky	Offensive linemen (OL): 62 Chris Foote C; 74 Brian Habib T/G; 72 Dave Huffman G; 76 Tim Irwin T; 69 Todd Kalis G; 63 Kirk Lowdermilk C; 64 Randall McDaniel G; 65 Gary Zimmerman T; Defensive linemen (DL): 71 Ken Clarke DT; 56 Chris Doleman DE; 79 Doug Martin DE; 75 Keith Millard DT; 99 Al Noga DE; 94 Thomas Strauthers DE; 97 Henry Thomas DT	Linebackers (LB): 50 Ray Berry OLB; 53 David Braxton OLB; 59 Mark Dusbabek OLB; 90 John Galvin MLB; 57 Mike Merriweather OLB; 55 Scott Studwell MLB; Defensive backs (DB): 44 Mike Brim CB; 47 Joey Browner SS; 49 Travis Curtis FS; 27 Brad Edwards FS; 29 Darrell Fullington FS; 39 Carl Lee CB; 26 Audray McMillian CB/S; 48 Reggie Rutland CB; Special teams (ST): 3 Rich Karlis K; 60 Mark Rodenhauser LS; 13 Bucky Scribner P	Practice squad: 32 Rick Bayless RB; —- John Buddenberg LB; -- Jarrod Delaney WR; 22 Ken Johnson CB/S; Reserve: -- Curtis Greer DE (IR); 82 Carl Hilton TE (IR); 52 Randy Rasmussen C/G (IR); 36 Allen Rice RB (IR); Rookies in italics 47 active, 4 reserve, 4 practice squad

== Preseason ==
Week	Date	Opponent	Result	Record	Venue	Attendance
1	August 12	vs Kansas City Chiefs	W 23–13	1–0	Liberty Bowl (Memphis, TN)	63,528
2	August 21	Washington Redskins	W 24–13	2–0	Hubert H. Humphrey Metrodome	50,213
3	August 26	at Los Angeles Rams	L 14–24	2–1	Anaheim Stadium	45,087
4	September 1	Cincinnati Bengals	W 17–10	3–1	Hubert H. Humphrey Metrodome	49,867

== Regular season ==
The defensive line of Chris Doleman, Keith Millard, Al Noga and Henry Thomas were key contributors in helping the Vikings rank number one in the NFL in total defense. In addition, the Vikings set a franchise record with 71 sacks in one season. Chris Doleman had 21 sacks and was one shy of tying the NFL record.

After the November 5th game against the Los Angeles Rams, in which kicker Rich Karlis led the team to victory with 7 field goals, Head Coach Jerry Burns gave an expletive laden press conference berating the press and Vikings fans for their continued haranging of Offensive Coordinator Bob Schnelker.

=== Schedule ===
Week	Date	Opponent	Result	Record	Venue	Attendance
1	September 10	Houston Oilers	W 38–7	1–0	Hubert H. Humphrey Metrodome	54,015
2	September 17	at Chicago Bears	L 7–38	1–1	Soldier Field	66,475
3	September 24	at Pittsburgh Steelers	L 14–27	1–2	Three Rivers Stadium	50,744
4	October 1	Tampa Bay Buccaneers	W 17–3	2–2	Hubert H. Humphrey Metrodome	54,817
5	October 8	Detroit Lions	W 24–17	3–2	Hubert H. Humphrey Metrodome	55,380
6	October 15	Green Bay Packers	W 26–14	4–2	Hubert H. Humphrey Metrodome	62,075
7	October 22	at Detroit Lions	W 20–7	5–2	Silverdome	51,579
8	October 30	at New York Giants	L 14–24	5–3	Giants Stadium	76,041
9	November 5	Los Angeles Rams	W 23–21 (OT)	6–3	Hubert H. Humphrey Metrodome	59,600
10	November 12	at Tampa Bay Buccaneers	W 24–10	7–3	Tampa Stadium	56,271
11	November 19	at Philadelphia Eagles	L 9–10	7–4	Veterans Stadium	65,944
12	November 26	at Green Bay Packers	L 19–20	7–5	Milwaukee County Stadium	55,592
13	December 3	Chicago Bears	W 27–16	8–5	Hubert H. Humphrey Metrodome	60,664
14	December 10	Atlanta Falcons	W 43–17	9–5	Hubert H. Humphrey Metrodome	58,116
15	December 17	at Cleveland Browns	L 17–23 (OT)	9–6	Cleveland Stadium	70,777
16	December 25	Cincinnati Bengals	W 29–21	10–6	Hubert H. Humphrey Metrodome	58,829

=== Game summaries ===
==== Week 2 at Chicago Bears ====
Week 2: Minnesota Vikings at Chicago Bears

Quarter	1	2	3	4	Total
Vikings	0	7	0	0	7
Bears	7	3	0	28	38

at Soldier Field, Chicago, Illinois

- Date: September 17, 1989
- Game time: 12:00 p.m. CST
- Game weather: Overcast, 62 °F (17 °C)
- TV announcers (CBS): Pat Summerall and John Madden

Game information

First quarter

Second quarter

Third quarter

Fourth quarter

Top passers

- MIN – Wade Wilson – 24/42, 253 yards, TD, 4 INT
- CHI – Mike Tomczak – 10/26, 142 yards, TD, INT

Top rushers

- MIN – Alfred Anderson – 5 rushes, 25 yards
- CHI – Neal Anderson – 23 rushes, 97 yards, 2 TD

Top receivers

- MIN – Anthony Carter – 6 receptions, 80 yards
- CHI – Neal Anderson – 3 receptions, 58 yards, TD

==== Week 3 at Pittsburgh Steelers ====
Week 3: Minnesota Vikings at Pittsburgh Steelers

Quarter	1	2	3	4	Total
Vikings	7	7	0	0	14
Steelers	7	14	0	6	27

at Three Rivers Stadium, Pittsburgh, Pennsylvania

- Date: September 17, 1989
- Game time: 12:00 p.m. CST/1:00 p.m. EDT
- Game weather: Overcast, 54 °F (12 °C)
- TV announcers (CBS): Steve Zabriskie and Hank Stram

Game information

First quarter

Second quarter

Third quarter

Fourth quarter

Top passers

- MIN – Wade Wilson – 12/22, 118 yards, INT
- PIT – Bubby Brister – 16/22, 157 yards, TD

Top rushers

- MIN – Hassan Jones – 1 rushes, 37 yards
- PIT – Merril Hoge – 17 rushes, 64 yards, TD

Top receivers

- MIN – Anthony Carter – 5 receptions, 56 yards
- PIT – Tim Worley – 4 receptions, 45 yards

==== Week 5: vs Detroit Lions ====
Week 5: Detroit Lions at Minnesota Vikings – Game summary

Quarter	1	2	3	4	Total
Lions	7	3	0	7	17
Vikings	0	24	0	0	24

at Metrodome, Minnesota

- Date: October 8, 1989
- Game time: 12:00 p.m. CST/1:00 p.m. EDT
- TV announcers (CBS): Tim Ryan and Randy Cross
- Box score

Game information

First quarter

- DET – Eric Hipple 1-yard rush (Eddie Murray) kick good, 1:40. Detroit 7–0 Drive: 4 plays, 31 yards, 1:40.

Second quarter

- MIN – Rich Karlis 22-yard field goal, 12:45. Detroit 7–3 Drive: 8 plays, 63 yards, 4:38.
- MIN – Mike Merriweather 15–yard interception return (Rich Karlis kick good), 11:42. Minnesota 10–7.
- MIN – Issiac Holt 90-yard interception return (Rich Karlis kick good), 5:19. Minnesota 17–7.
- MIN – Brent Novoselsky 2-yard pass from Tommy Kramer (Rich Karlis kick good), 0:54. Minnesota 24–7 Drive: 13 plays, 73 yards, 4:25.
- DET – Eddie Murray 50-yard field goal, 0:54. Minnesota 24–10 Drive: 6 plays, 32 yards, 0:54.

Third quarter No scoring plays Fourth quarter

- DET – Bob Gagliano 1-yard rush (Eddie Murray kick good), 4:25. Minnesota 24–17 Drive: 19 plays, 80 yards, 7:12.

Top passers

- DET – Eric Hipple – 7/18, 90 yards, 3 INT
- MIN – Tommy Kramer – 11/18, 146 yards, TD

Top receivers

- DET – Richard Johnson – 3 receptions, 38 yards
- MIN – Hassan Jones – 2 receptions, 44 yards

Top rushers

- DET – Barry Sanders – 23 attempts, 99 yards
- MIN – Rick Fenney – 9 attempts, 35 yards

==== Week 6 vs Green Bay Packers ====
Week 6: Green Bay Packers at Minnesota Vikings

Quarter	1	2	3	4	Total
Packers	7	0	0	7	14
Vikings	0	17	9	0	26

at Hubert H. Humphrey Metrodome, Minneapolis, Minnesota

- Date: October 15, 1989
- Game time: 12:00 p.m. CST
- Game weather: None (indoor stadium)
- TV announcers (CBS): Verne Lundquist and Terry Bradshaw

Game information

First quarter

Second quarter

Third quarter

Fourth quarter

Top passers

- GB – Don Majkowski – 9/24, 198 yards, TD, 2 INT
- MIN – Tommy Kramer – 14/24, 172 yards, 2 TD, INT

Top rushers

- GB – Keith Woodside – 3 rushes, 36 yards
- MIN – Herschel Walker – 18 rushes, 148 yards

Top receivers

- GB – Sterling Sharpe – 2 receptions, 82 yards
- MIN – Hassan Jones – 4 receptions, 68 yards

=== Standings ===
NFC Central
	W	L	T	PCT	DIV	CONF	PF	PA	STK
^{(3)} Minnesota Vikings	10	6	0	.625	6–2	8–4	351	275	W1
Green Bay Packers	10	6	0	.625	5–3	10–4	362	356	W2
Detroit Lions	7	9	0	.438	4–4	6–6	312	364	W5
Chicago Bears	6	10	0	.375	2–6	4–8	358	377	L6
Tampa Bay Buccaneers	5	11	0	.313	3–5	5–7	320	419	L4

== Postseason ==
=== Schedule ===
Week	Date	Opponent (seed)	Result	Record	Venue	Attendance
Wild Card	Bye					
Divisional	January 6	at San Francisco 49ers (1)	L 13–41	0–1	Candlestick Park	64,585

== Herschel Walker trade ==
In 1989, at the height of his NFL career, the Cowboys traded Herschel Walker to the Minnesota Vikings for a total of five players (LB Jesse Solomon, DB Issiac Holt, RB Darrin Nelson, LB David Howard, DE Alex Stewart) and six draft picks (which led to Emmitt Smith, Russell Maryland, Kevin Smith, and Darren Woodson). This was judged to be one of the turning points in the rise of the Cowboys to the top echelon of the NFL. Walker's trade was widely perceived as an exceptionally poor move considering what the Vikings had to give up in order to get him, and remains one of the most frequently vilified roster moves of the team's history. The Vikings coaches reluctantly accepted Walker after the trade and never totally used the tool they had been given. Scout.com says, "Walker was never used properly by the coaching brain trust (a total oxymoron in this case)".

== Statistics ==
=== Team leaders ===
Category	Player(s)	Value
Passing yards	Wade Wilson	2,543
Passing touchdowns	Wade Wilson	9
Rushing yards	Herschel Walker	669
Rushing touchdowns	Herschel Walker	5
Receiving yards	Anthony Carter	1,066
Receiving touchdowns	Anthony Carter	4
Points	Rich Karlis	120
Kickoff return yards	Herschel Walker	374
Punt return yards	Leo Lewis	446
Tackles	Chris Doleman; Henry Thomas	94
Sacks	Chris Doleman	21.0
Interceptions	Joey Browner	5
Forced fumbles	Chris Doleman	5

=== League rankings ===
Category	Total yards	Yards per game	NFL rank (out of 28)
Passing offense	3,189	199.3	17th
Rushing offense	2,066	129.1	7th
Total offense	5,255	328.4	14th
Passing defense	2,501	156.3	1st
Rushing defense	1,683	105.2	11th
Total defense	4,184	261.5	1st

== Awards and records ==
- Keith Millard – NFL Defensive Player of the Year (AP, UPI, PFWA)
- Chris Doleman – NFL sacks leader (21.0)
- Randall McDaniel – NFC Pro Bowl selection

=== Milestones ===
- Chris Doleman, third player in NFL history to reach 20 sacks in a season
- Chris Doleman, franchise record, 21 sacks
