= 1991 Minnesota Vikings season =

NFL team season

- General manager: Jeff Diamond
- Head coach: Jerry Burns
- Home stadium: Hubert H. Humphrey Metrodome

Results
- Record: 8–8
- Division place: 3rd NFC Central
- Playoffs: Did not qualify
- All-Pros: G Randall McDaniel (2nd team)
- Pro Bowlers: TE Steve Jordan; G Randall McDaniel; DT Henry Thomas

Uniform
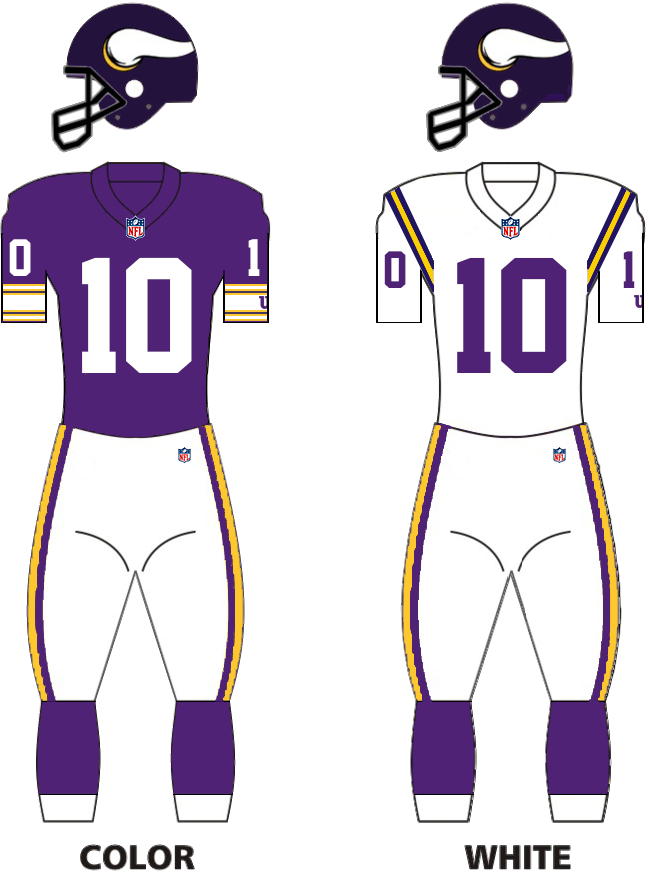

The 1991 season was the Minnesota Vikings' 31st in the National Football League. They finished with an 8–8 record, improving on their 6–10 record from the previous season, but missed the playoffs for the second straight year. Head coach Jerry Burns retired at the end of the season.

Herschel Walker, going into his third year with Minnesota, went through another season of frustration and he was released following the season. In his two-and-a-half seasons with the Vikings, he failed to record a 1,000-yard season. The infamous trade that brought Walker to Minnesota never lived up to expectations and allowed the Dallas Cowboys to use two of the draft picks they received in the trade on Emmitt Smith and Darren Woodson, who became part of a dominant team that won three Super Bowls in the 1990s.

== Offseason ==
=== 1991 draft ===
| Pro Bowler |

1991 Minnesota Vikings Draft
| Draft order | | Player name | Position | College | Notes |
| Round | Selection | Player name | Position | College | Notes |
|---|---|---|---|---|---|
| 1 | 11 | Traded to the Dallas Cowboys (Note: These picks were involved in the Herschel Walker trade on October 12, 1989.) | | | |
| 2 | 38 | Traded to the Dallas Cowboys | | | |
| 3 | 65 | Carlos Jenkins | Linebacker | Michigan State | |
| 3 | 68 | Jake Reed | Wide receiver | Grambling State | From Cowboys |
| 4 | 92 | Randy Baldwin | Running back | Ole Miss | |
| 5 | 119 | Chris Thome | Center | Minnesota | |
| 6 | 146 | Traded to the Los Angeles Raiders (Note: The Vikings traded their sixth-round selection (146th overall) to the Raiders in exchange for the a sixth- and seventh-round selection (163rd and 180th overall).) | | | |
| 6 | 163 | Todd Scott | Safety | Southwestern Louisiana | From Raiders |
| 7 | 179 | Scotty Reagan | Defensive tackle | Humboldt State | |
| 7 | 180 | Tripp Welborne | Safety | Michigan | From Cowboys, via Raiders |
| 8 | 206 | Reggie Johnson | Defensive end | Arizona | |
| 9 | 232 | Gerald Hudson | Running back | Oklahoma State | |
| 10 | 259 | Brady Pierce | Offensive tackle | Wisconsin | |
| 11 | 286 | Ivan Caesar | Linebacker | Boston College | |
| 12 | 313 | Darren Hughes | Wide receiver | Carson–Newman | |

Draft trades

== Staff ==
1991 Minnesota Vikings staff
| Front office: President/Chief Executive Officer – Roger Headrick; Head coaches: Head coach – Jerry Burns; Offensive coaches: Offensive coordinator – Tom Moore; Assistant offensive coordinator/passing game – Dick Rehbein; Quarterbacks – Marc Trestman; Running backs – John Brunner; Offensive line – John Michels | Defensive coaches: Defensive coordinator – Monte Kiffin; Defensive line – Paul Wiggin; Linebackers – Maxie Baughan; Defensive backs – Jerry Brown; Special teams coaches: Special teams/Tight Ends– Tom Batta |

== Roster ==
1991 Minnesota Vikings roster
| Quarterbacks (QB): 16 Rich Gannon; 12 Sean Salisbury; 11 Wade Wilson; Running backs (RB): 21 Terry Allen; 46 Alfred Anderson FB; 31 Rick Fenney FB; 20 Darrin Nelson KR; 34 Herschel Walker; Wide receivers (WR): 81 Anthony Carter; 80 Cris Carter; 84 Hassan Jones; 87 Leo Lewis PR; 89 Terry Obee; Tight ends (TE): 82 Mike Jones; 83 Steve Jordan; 85 Brent Novoselsky | Offensive linemen (OL): 72 Scott Adams T; 74 Brian Habib G/T; 76 Tim Irwin T; 69 Todd Kalis G; 63 Kirk Lowdermilk C; 64 Randall McDaniel G; 60 Adam Schreiber C/G; 73 Craig Wolfley G; 65 Gary Zimmerman T; Defensive linemen (DL): 71 Ken Clarke DT; 56 Chris Doleman DE; 99 Al Noga DE; 93 John Randle DE; 94 Thomas Strauthers DT; 97 Henry Thomas DT | Linebackers (LB): 50 Ray Berry MLB; 53 Ivan Caesar OLB; 91 Greg Manusky MLB; 57 Mike Merriweather OLB; 58 Jimmy Williams OLB; Defensive backs (DB): 47 Joey Browner SS; 24 Pat Eilers FS; 23 Michael Mayes CB; 26 Audray McMillian CB; 48 Reggie Rutland CB; 38 Todd Scott SS; 41 Solomon Wilcots SS; 22 Felix Wright FS; Special teams (ST): 68 Mike Morris LS; 18 Harry Newsome P; 7 Fuad Reveiz K | Practice squad: —- Scotty Reagan DE; Reserve: 59 Mark Dusbabek LB (IR); 62 Chris Foote C (IR); 51 Carlos Jenkins LB (IR); 39 Carl Lee CB (IR); 75 Keith Millard DT (IR); 86 Jake Reed WR (IR); 67 Mike Teeter DT (IR); Rookies in italics 47 active, 7 reserve, 1 practice squad |

== Preseason ==
| Week | Date | Opponent | Result | Record | Venue | Attendance |
|---|---|---|---|---|---|---|
| 1 | August 3 | at New Orleans Saints | L 21–24 | 0–1 | Louisiana Superdome | 58,953 |
| 2 | August 10 | Pittsburgh Steelers | W 34–24 | 1–1 | Hubert H. Humphrey Metrodome | 44,959 |
| 3 | August 17 | at Cincinnati Bengals | L 24–27 (OT) | 1–2 | Riverfront Stadium | 56,358 |
| 4 | August 23 | Cleveland Browns | W 31–7 | 2–2 | Hubert H. Humphrey Metrodome | 45,925 |

== Regular season ==
=== Schedule ===
| Week | Date | Opponent | Result | Record | Venue | Attendance |
|---|---|---|---|---|---|---|
| 1 | September 1 | at **Chicago Bears** | **L** 6–10 | 0–1 | Soldier Field | 64,112 |
| 2 | September 8 | at Atlanta Falcons | **W** 20–19 | 1–1 | Atlanta–Fulton County Stadium | 50,936 |
| 3 | September 15 | San Francisco 49ers | **W** 17–14 | 2–1 | Hubert H. Humphrey Metrodome | 59,148 |
| 4 | September 22 | at New Orleans Saints | **L** 0–26 | 2–2 | Louisiana Superdome | 68,591 |
| 5 | September 29 | Denver Broncos | **L** 6–13 | 2–3 | Hubert H. Humphrey Metrodome | 55,031 |
| 6 | October 6 | at **Detroit Lions** | **L** 20–24 | 2–4 | Pontiac Silverdome | 63,423 |
| 7 | October 13 | Phoenix Cardinals | **W** 34–7 | 3–4 | Hubert H. Humphrey Metrodome | 51,209 |
| 8 | October 20 | at New England Patriots | **L** 23–26 (OT) | 3–5 | Foxboro Stadium | 45,367 |
| 9 | October 27 | at Phoenix Cardinals | **W** 28–0 | 4–5 | Sun Devil Stadium | 45,447 |
| 10 | November 3 | **Tampa Bay Buccaneers** | **W** 28–13 | 5–5 | Hubert H. Humphrey Metrodome | 35,737 |
| 11 | November 11 | **Chicago Bears** | **L** 17–34 | 5–6 | Hubert H. Humphrey Metrodome | 59,001 |
| 12 | November 17 | at **Green Bay Packers** | **W** 35–21 | 6–6 | Lambeau Field | 57,614 |
| 13 | November 24 | **Detroit Lions** | **L** 14–34 | 6–7 | Hubert H. Humphrey Metrodome | 51,644 |
| 14 | Bye | | | | | |
| 15 | December 8 | at **Tampa Bay Buccaneers** | **W** 26–24 | 7–7 | Tampa Stadium | 41,091 |
| 16 | December 15 | Los Angeles Rams | **W** 20–14 | 8–7 | Hubert H. Humphrey Metrodome | 61,518 |
| 17 | December 21 | **Green Bay Packers** | **L** 7–27 | 8–8 | Hubert H. Humphrey Metrodome | 52,860 |
Note: Intra-division opponents are in **bold** text.

=== Game summaries ===
==== Week 1: at Chicago Bears ====
Week 1: Minnesota Vikings at Chicago Bears – Game summary

| Quarter | 1 | 2 | 3 | 4 | Total |
|---|---|---|---|---|---|
| Vikings | 3 | 0 | 3 | 0 | **6** |
| **Bears** | 0 | 7 | 0 | 3 | **10** |

at Soldier Field, Chicago, Illinois

- Date: September 1
- Game time: 3:00 p.m. CST
- Game weather: Mostly sunny, 68 °F (20 °C)
- Game attendance: 64,112
- Referee: Tom Dooley (6)
- Box score, Game Book

Game information

**First quarter**

- MIN – Fuad Reveiz 26-yard field goal, 5:50. Vikings 3–0. **Drive: 13 plays, 72 yards, 5:50.**

**Second quarter**

- CHI – Tom Waddle 37-yard pass from Jim Harbaugh (Kevin Butler kick), 14:05. Bears 7–3. **Drive: 10 plays, 98 yards, 5:38.**

**Third quarter**

- MIN – Fuad Reveiz 24-yard field goal, 9:31. Bears 7–6. **Drive: 11 plays, 60 yards, 5:20.**

**Fourth quarter**

- CHI – Kevin Butler 22-yard field goal, 9:06. Bears 10–6. **Drive: 10 plays, 45 yards, 5:58.**

**Top passers**

- MIN – Wade Wilson – 21/36, 248 yards, 3 INT
- CHI – Jim Harbaugh – 17/24, 186 yards, TD

**Top rushers**

- MIN – Herschel Walker – 20 rushes, 86 yards
- CHI – Neal Anderson – 23 rushes, 58 yards

**Top receivers**

- MIN – Steve Jordan – 8 receptions, 89 yards
- CHI – Tom Waddle – 2 receptions, 48 yards, TD

==== Week 6: at Detroit Lions ====
Week 6: Minnesota Vikings at Detroit Lions – Game summary

| Quarter | 1 | 2 | 3 | 4 | Total |
|---|---|---|---|---|---|
| Vikings | 7 | 7 | 3 | 3 | **20** |
| **Lions** | 0 | 3 | 0 | 21 | **24** |

at Pontiac Silverdome, Pontiac, Michigan

- Date: October 6
- Game time: 1:00 p.m. EDT/12:00 p.m. CDT
- Game weather: None (indoor stadium)
- Game attendance: 63,423
- Referee: Dick Hantak (105)
- Box score, Game Book

Game information

**First quarter**

- MIN – Darrin Nelson 11-yard run (Fuad Reveiz kick), 9:41. Vikings 7–0. **Drive: 4 plays, 24 yards.**

**Second quarter**

- MIN – Steve Jordan 2-yard pass from Rich Gannon (Fuad Reveiz kick), 11:08. Vikings 14–0. **Drive: 3 plays, 16 yards.**
- DET – Eddie Murray 47-yard field goal, 0:00. Vikings 14–3. **Drive: 5 plays, 13 yards.**

**Third quarter**

- MIN – Fuad Reveiz 42-yard field goal, 2:50. Vikings 17–3. **Drive: 11 plays, 46 yards.**

**Fourth quarter**

- MIN – Fuad Reveiz 25-yard field goal, 8:38. Vikings 20–3. **Drive: 12 plays, 60 yards.**
- DET – Robert Clark 68-yard pass from Rodney Peete (Eddie Murray kick), 6:50. Vikings 20–10. **Drive: 4 plays, 80 yards.**
- DET – Willie Green 16-yard pass from Rodney Peete (Eddie Murray kick), 4:22. Vikings 20–17. **Drive: 8 plays, 57 yards.**
- DET – Barry Sanders 15-yard run (Eddie Murray kick), 0:36. Lions 24–20. **Drive: 10 plays, 72 yards.**

**Top passers**

- MIN – Rich Gannon – 10/23, 105 yards, TD
- DET – Rodney Peete – 24/38, 281 yards, 2 TD, INT

**Top rushers**

- MIN – Terry Allen – 15 rushes, 41 yards
- DET – Barry Sanders – 25 rushes, 116 yards, TD

**Top receivers**

- MIN – Steve Jordan – 4 receptions, 44 yards, TD
- DET – Robert Clark – 2 receptions, 83 yards, TD

=== Standings ===
NFC Central
| | W | L | T | PCT | DIV | CONF | PF | PA | STK |
|---|---|---|---|---|---|---|---|---|---|
| ^{(2)} Detroit Lions | 12 | 4 | 0 | .750 | 6–2 | 8–4 | 339 | 295 | W6 |
| ^{(4)} Chicago Bears | 11 | 5 | 0 | .688 | 7–1 | 9–3 | 299 | 269 | L1 |
| Minnesota Vikings | 8 | 8 | 0 | .500 | 3–5 | 8–6 | 301 | 306 | L1 |
| Green Bay Packers | 4 | 12 | 0 | .250 | 3–5 | 3–9 | 273 | 313 | W1 |
| Tampa Bay Buccaneers | 3 | 13 | 0 | .188 | 1–7 | 2–10 | 199 | 365 | W1 |

== Statistics ==
=== Team leaders ===
| Category | Player(s) | Value |
|---|---|---|
| Passing yards | Rich Gannon | 2,166 |
| Passing touchdowns | Rich Gannon | 12 |
| Rushing yards | Herschel Walker | 825 |
| Rushing touchdowns | Herschel Walker | 10 |
| Receiving yards | Cris Carter | 962 |
| Receiving touchdowns | Anthony Carter; Cris Carter | 5 |
| Points | Fuad Reveiz | 85 |
| Kickoff return yards | Darrin Nelson | 682 |
| Punt return yards | Leo Lewis | 225 |
| Tackles | Chris Doleman | 101 |
| Sacks | John Randle | 9.5 |
| Interceptions | Joey Browner | 5 |
| Forced fumbles | John Randle | 2 |

=== League rankings ===
| Category | Total yards | Yards per game | NFL rank (out of 28) |
|---|---|---|---|
| Passing offense | 2,883 | 180.2 | 21st |
| Rushing offense | 2,201 | 137.6 | 4th |
| Total offense | 5,084 | 317.8 | 10th |
| Passing defense | 3,179 | 198.7 | 13th |
| Rushing defense | 1,837 | 114.8 | 20th |
| Total defense | 5,016 | 313.5 | 14th |
