= Najee Mustafaa =

American football player (born 1964)

No. 48
- Position: Cornerback

Personal information
- Born: June 20, 1964 (age 62); East Point, Georgia, U.S.
- Listed height: 6 ft 1 in (1.85 m)
- Listed weight: 190 lb (86 kg)

Career information
- High school: Russell (East Point)
- College: Georgia Tech
- NFL draft: 1987: 4th round, 100th overall pick

Career history
- Minnesota Vikings (1987–1992); Cleveland Browns (1993); Miami Dolphins (1994); Oakland Raiders (1995)

Career NFL statistics
- Tackles: 222
- Interceptions: 11
- Touchdowns: 3
- Stats at Pro Football Reference

Najee Mustafaa, birth name Reggie Rutland, (born June 20, 1964) is an American former professional football player who played safety for seven seasons for the Minnesota Vikings, Cleveland Browns, and Oakland Raiders. He was a fourth round selection by the Vikings in the 1987 NFL draft. He played collegiately for the Georgia Tech football team. He set the Vikings' franchise record for longest interception return (97 yards) in 1991 and the Browns' franchise record for the longest interception return (97 yards) in 1993, though both records have since been broken.

== NFL career statistics ==
Legend
| | Led the league |
| **Bold** | Career high |

=== Regular season ===
| Year | Team | Games | | Tackles | | | | Interceptions | | | | Fumbles | | | |
| Year | Team | GP | GS | Comb | Solo | Ast | Sck | Int | Yds | TD | Lng | FF | FR | Yds | TD |
|---|---|---|---|---|---|---|---|---|---|---|---|---|---|---|---|
| 1987 | MIN | 7 | 0 | 12 | - | - | 0.0 | 0 | 0 | 0 | 0 | 0 | 0 | 0 | 0 |
| 1988 | MIN | **16** | 7 | 35 | - | - | 0.0 | **3** | 63 | 0 | 36 | 0 | **2** | 17 | 0 |
| 1989 | MIN | **16** | **16** | **48** | - | - | 0.0 | 2 | 7 | 0 | 7 | 0 | **2** | **27** | **1** |
| 1990 | MIN | **16** | **16** | 30 | - | - | 0.0 | 2 | 21 | 0 | 16 | 0 | 0 | 0 | 0 |
| 1991 | MIN | 13 | 12 | 44 | - | - | 0.0 | **3** | **104** | **1** | **97** | 0 | 0 | 0 | 0 |
| 1993 | CLE | 14 | 14 | 39 | - | - | 0.0 | 1 | 97 | **1** | **97** | 0 | 0 | 0 | 0 |
| 1995 | OAK | 15 | 1 | 14 | **12** | **2** | 0.0 | 0 | 0 | 0 | 0 | **1** | 0 | 0 | 0 |
| Career | | 97 | 66 | 222 | 12 | 2 | 0.0 | 11 | 292 | 2 | 97 | 1 | 4 | 44 | 1 |
