= Bucky Scribner =

American football player (1960–2017)

No. 13
- Position: Punter

Personal information
- Born: July 11, 1960; Lawrence, Kansas, U.S.
- Died: September 16, 2017 (aged 57); Kansas City, Missouri, U.S.
- Listed height: 6 ft 0 in (1.83 m)
- Listed weight: 207 lb (94 kg)

Career information
- High school: Lawrence
- College: Kansas
- NFL draft: 1983: 11th round, 299th overall pick

Career history
- Green Bay Packers (1983–1984); Seattle Seahawks (1986)*; Minnesota Vikings (1987–1989)
- * Offseason or practice squad member only

Awards and highlights
- 2× Second-team All-American (1981, 1982); 3× First-team All-Big Eight (1980, 1981, 1982)

Career NFL statistics
- Punts: 330
- Punting yards: 13,543
- Longest punt: 70
- Stats at Pro Football Reference

William Charles "Bucky" Scribner (July 11, 1960 – September 16, 2017) was an American professional football player who was a punter in the National Football League (NFL). He played college football for the Kansas Jayhawks, twice earning second-team All-American honors. He selected 299th overall in the 11th round of the 1983 NFL Draft. A left-footed punter, he played five seasons for the Green Bay Packers (1983–1984) and the Minnesota Vikings (1987–1989).

He died from brain cancer on September 16, 2017.

== NFL career statistics ==
Legend
| | Led the league |
| **Bold** | Career high |

=== Regular season ===
| Year | Team | Punting | | | | | | | | | |
| Year | Team | GP | Punts | Yds | Net Yds | Lng | Avg | Net Avg | Blk | Ins20 | TB |
|---|---|---|---|---|---|---|---|---|---|---|---|
| 1983 | GNB | **16** | 69 | 2,869 | 2,345 | **70** | 41.6 | 33.5 | 1 | 11 | 7 |
| 1984 | GNB | **16** | **85** | **3,596** | **2,988** | 61 | **42.3** | 35.2 | 0 | 18 | **12** |
| 1987 | MIN | 4 | 20 | 827 | 728 | 54 | 41.4 | **36.4** | 0 | 4 | 1 |
| 1988 | MIN | **16** | 84 | 3,387 | 2,802 | 55 | 40.3 | 32.6 | **2** | **23** | 9 |
| 1989 | MIN | **16** | 72 | 2,864 | 2,404 | 55 | 39.8 | 33.4 | 0 | 16 | 8 |
| Career | | 68 | 330 | 13,543 | 11,267 | 70 | 41.0 | 33.8 | 3 | 72 | 37 |

=== Playoffs ===
| Year | Team | Punting | | | | | | | | | |
| Year | Team | GP | Punts | Yds | Net Yds | Lng | Avg | Net Avg | Blk | Ins20 | TB |
|---|---|---|---|---|---|---|---|---|---|---|---|
| 1987 | MIN | **3** | **18** | **610** | **583** | 46 | 33.9 | **32.4** | 0 | **4** | 0 |
| 1988 | MIN | 2 | 14 | 566 | 451 | **51** | **40.4** | 32.2 | 0 | 1 | **1** |
| 1989 | MIN | 1 | 4 | 128 | 122 | 39 | 32.0 | 24.4 | **1** | 0 | 0 |
| Career | | 6 | 36 | 1,304 | 1,156 | 51 | 36.2 | 31.2 | 1 | 5 | 1 |
