= Anthony Carter (American football) =

American football player (born 1960)

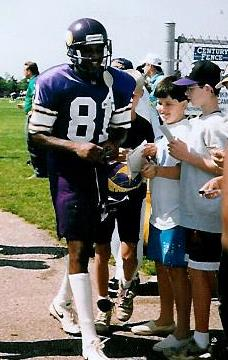
- Carter signing autographs with the Minnesota Vikings in 1993

No. 1, 81
- Position: Wide receiver

Personal information
- Born: September 17, 1960 (age 66); Riviera Beach, Florida, U.S.
- Listed height: 5 ft 11 in (1.80 m)
- Listed weight: 168 lb (76 kg)

Career information
- High school: Suncoast (Riviera Beach)
- College: Michigan (1979–1982)
- NFL draft: 1983: 12th round, 334th overall pick

Career history
- Michigan Panthers (1983–1984); Oakland Invaders (1985); Miami Dolphins (1985)*; Minnesota Vikings (1985–1993); Detroit Lions (1994–1995)
- * Offseason or practice squad member only

Awards and highlights
- USFL champion (1983); 2× All-USFL (1983, 1985); 3× Pro Bowl (1987–1989); 50 Greatest Vikings; Minnesota Vikings All-Mall of America Field Team; 2× Unanimous All-American (1981, 1982); First-team All-American (1980); Big Ten Most Valuable Player (1982); Big Ten Player of the Year (1982); 3× First-team All-Big Ten (1980–1982)

Career NFL statistics
- Receptions: 486
- Receiving yards: 7,733
- Receiving touchdowns: 55
- Stats at Pro Football Reference
- College Football Hall of Fame

Anthony Carter (born September 17, 1960) is an American former professional football player who was a wide receiver for 13 years in the United States Football League (USFL) and National Football League (NFL). He made three-consecutive Pro Bowls for the Minnesota Vikings and was honored by Minnesota as one of the 50 Greatest Vikings of all time. Carter played college football for the Michigan Wolverines, finishing his career as a three-time All-American, and a two-time unanimous All-American selection. He is currently third all-time in receiving yards, and second all-time in receiving touchdowns for the University of Michigan.

== College career ==
Carter played at the University of Michigan from 1979 to 1982. Although the Wolverines employed an offense that relied mostly on its running backs, he was one of the most productive receivers in the school's history. Standing 5 feet, 11 inches tall and weighing only 160 pounds, Carter relied on his speed to make plays and provided an effective counterpoint to coach Bo Schembechler's running game plan. In addition to his duties as a receiver, he was also the team's kickoff and punt returner for most of his career. Carter caught more than two passes in a game only once that season, but made the most of it when the ball was thrown to him with 7-of-17 receptions accounting for touchdowns. He averaged 27.2 yards per catch.

His 45-yard touchdown catch and run against Indiana as time ran out to give Michigan a 27–21 victory is considered one of the greatest plays in Michigan football history, and the radio call by the legendary Bob Ufer is also considered a classic. In that game, Lee Corso's Indiana Hoosiers had tied it up with about a minute to go. At that time, college games could end in a tie, and Michigan had a 6–1 overall record, 4–0 in the Big Ten. While a tie was essentially as good as a win from Indiana's perspective, a tie was as good as a loss from Michigan's perspective. On the ensuing drive, Michigan was only able to get to the Indiana 45-yard line with time fast running out. Things looked grim, but with six seconds remaining, Carter told quarterback John Wangler in the huddle, "Hey, Johnny. Throw the ball to me. I'm going to be open." On the next play, Carter, sprinting left to right, met Wangler's pass in a seam over the middle at the Hoosier 25. He made a one-step cutback to his left to avoid one tackle and slipped another tackle at the 5-yard line before bounding into the endzone after time had expired.

By his sophomore year, Carter was the Wolverines primary option at receiver. That season, he became the first sophomore to be voted Michigan team MVP. As a three-time All-American, he was named Big Ten Most Valuable Player his senior season, and finished fourth in voting for the Heisman Trophy. He was the third NCAA Division I FBS athlete to total 1,000 career yards on both kick returns and punt returns. He holds the NCAA career record for highest average gain per play (Min. 5,000 yards, 275–374 plays, 5,197 on 298).

In 2001, Carter was elected to the College Football Hall of Fame. On December 12, 2014, the Big Ten Network included Carter on "The Mount Rushmore of Michigan Football", as chosen by online fan voting. Carter was joined in the honor by Charles Woodson, Tom Harmon, and Desmond Howard.

=== Statistics ===
Season	Receiving				Rushing			
Season	Rec	Yds	Avg	TD	Att	Yds	Avg	TD
1979	17	462	27.2	7	4	17	4.3	0
1980	51	818	16.0	14	10	68	6.8	0
1981	50	952	19.0	8	12	67	5.6	1
1982	43	844	19.6	8	10	61	6.1	0
Totals	161	3,076	19.0	37	29	173	6.0	1

=== Records ===
When he graduated, Carter held nearly every Michigan career receiving and return record. He was the school's all-time leader in:

- touchdowns: 40 (now ranks fifth; record held by Anthony Thomas with 55)
- receptions: 161 (now ranks fifth; record held by Braylon Edwards with 252)
- receiving yards: 3,076 (now ranks second; record held by Braylon Edwards with 3,541)
- touchdown receptions: 37 (now ranks second; record held by Braylon Edwards with 39)
- punt returns: 79 (now ranks second; record held by Steve Breaston with 127)
- punt return yardage: 907 (now ranks second; record held by Steve Breaston with 1,599)
- kickoff returns: 63 (now ranks second; record held by Steve Breaston with 81)
- kickoff return yardage: 1,606 (now ranks second; record held by Steve Breaston with 1,993)

His average of 17.4 yards-per-play was an NCAA record.

=== Awards ===
- University of Michigan MVP: 1980, 1982
- Big Ten Conference MVP: 1982
- All-Big Ten: 1980, 1981, 1982
- All-American: 1980, 1981, 1982
- Heisman Trophy voting: 1980—10th; 1981—7th; 1982—4th

== Professional career ==
=== USFL ===
Upon graduating from college, Anthony Carter chose to play in the upstart USFL, rather than in the NFL. The league employed a territorial draft, aimed at sending players to teams whose fans were already familiar with them. Because of this unique system, the Michigan Panthers were allowed to select Carter prior to the league's traditional draft.

1983 was Carter's first season with the Panthers and one of his most successful as a professional. Although the team started 1–4, they finished the regular season 12–6 and went on to defeat the Philadelphia Stars to win the first USFL championship. With his team behind late in the fourth quarter, he scored the game-winning touchdown on a 48-yard pass from Bobby Hebert. He finished the game with nine receptions for 179 yards. For the season, he gained 1,081 yards on 60 catches, nine of them touchdowns.

Carter's 1984 season was cut short after only six games when his arm was broken in a game against the San Antonio Gunslingers. Before the 1985 season the Panthers merged with the Oakland Invaders. In his last USFL season, he led his team in receiving yards (1,323), receptions (70), and receiving touchdowns (14) and was named 2nd Team All-USFL and made the Sporting News' All-USFL team.

=== NFL ===
After the 1985 USFL season, Carter signed with the NFL's Miami Dolphins, who drafted Carter in the 12th round back in 1983 in order to secure his NFL rights. However, he was traded to the Minnesota Vikings before playing a game with the team. He led the Vikings in receptions five of his first six seasons with the team, and was selected to the Pro Bowl in 1987, 1988, and 1989. In the 1987 season, Carter helped his team reach the NFC championship. He set an NFL playoff record (since surpassed) with 143 punt return yards in their wildcard win over the New Orleans Saints, and caught ten receptions for a then NFL playoff record 227 yards, along with 1 carry for 30 yards and two punt returns for 21 in the Vikings 36–24 upset win over the 13–2 San Francisco 49ers in the divisional playoff round. The 642 all purpose yards he gained in the 1987 playoffs remain a single postseason record.

The following season, he caught four passes for 102 yards in a 28–17 wild card round win over the Los Angeles Rams. Although Cris Carter became the team's number one receiver in 1991, Anthony Carter remained an effective offensive weapon through 1993, his final season with the team.

The final two years of Carter's professional career were spent in the same state where it began, this time with the Detroit Lions. Most of his time with the Lions was spent attempting to come back from injury. He played in only four games in 1994, and failed to catch a pass in 1995.

Carter finished his 11 NFL seasons with 486 receptions for 7,733 yards and 55 touchdowns. He also rushed for 289 yards and 2 touchdowns, returned 15 punts for 165 yards, and returned 4 kickoffs for 65 yards.

=== Achievements and records ===
- Carter scored a touchdown in NFL games played on Thursday, Friday, Saturday, Sunday, and Monday
- Carter holds the record for most all-purpose yards in a single postseason (1987): 642
- Carter holds the record for most punt return yards in a single postseason (1987): 221

=== Awards ===
- 1983 Sporting News All-USFL team (as a punt returner)
- 1985 Sporting News All-USFL team
- 1987 Second-team All-NFC
- 1988 Second-team All-NFC

== NFL career statistics ==
=== Regular season ===
Year	Team	Games		Receiving				
Year	Team	GP	GS	Rec	Yds	Avg	Lng	TD
1985	MIN	16	15	43	821	19.1	57	8
1986	MIN	12	10	38	686	18.1	60	7
1987	MIN	12	11	38	922	24.3	73	7
1988	MIN	16	16	72	1,225	17.0	67	6
1989	MIN	16	16	65	1,066	16.4	50	4
1990	MIN	15	14	70	1,008	14.4	56	8
1991	MIN	15	15	51	553	10.8	46	5
1992	MIN	16	14	41	580	14.1	54	2
1993	MIN	15	14	60	775	12.9	39	5
1994	DET	4	1	8	97	12.1	18	3
1995	DET	3	0	Did not record any stats				
Career		140	126	486	7,733	15.9	73	55

== USFL career statistics ==
Year	Team	Games		Receiving					Punt returns				
Year	Team	GP	GS	Rec	Yds	Avg	Lng	TD	No	Yds	Avg	Lng	TD
1983	MICH	18	17	60	1,181	19.7	81	9	40	387	9.7	57	1
1984	MICH	6	6	30	538	17.9	55	4	5	21	4.2	13	0
1985	OAK	17		70	1,323	18.9	62	14					
Career		41	23	160	3,042	19.0	81	27	45	408	9.1	57	1
