= Steve Jordan (tight end) =

American football player (born 1961)

No. 83
- Position: Tight end

Personal information
- Born: January 10, 1961 (age 65); Phoenix, Arizona, U.S.
- Listed height: 6 ft 3 in (1.91 m)
- Listed weight: 242 lb (110 kg)

Career information
- High school: South Mountain (Phoenix)
- College: Brown (1978–1981)
- NFL draft: 1982: 7th round, 179th overall pick

Career history
- Minnesota Vikings (1982–1994)

Awards and highlights
- 6× Pro Bowl (1986–1991); Minnesota Vikings Ring of Honor; 50 Greatest Vikings; Minnesota Vikings 40th Anniversary Team; Second-team All-East (1981)

Career NFL statistics
- Receptions: 498
- Receiving yards: 6,307
- Receiving touchdowns: 28
- Stats at Pro Football Reference

Steven Russell Jordan (born January 10, 1961) is an American former professional football player who was a tight end in the National Football League (NFL) for the Minnesota Vikings from 1982 to 1994. He played college football for the Brown Bears.

== Early life and education ==
Steve Jordan grew up in Phoenix, Arizona, and graduated from South Mountain High School. A multi-sport athlete, he played football, basketball, and tennis in high school, but he concentrated on academics.

He attended college at Brown University, where he graduated with a Bachelor of Science degree from the Brown University School of Engineering in 1982. In addition to his engineering coursework, he tried out for the football team and made the varsity lineup his sophomore year. Although the Brown coaching staff originally thought he would not play "a minute of varsity ball," Jordan was twice named to the first-team All-Ivy League squad and he also made All-American honorable mention. After his senior season, Jordan was awarded the Tuss McLaughry Trophy as the Brown football team member "who through sportsmanship, performance, and influence, contributed most to the sport at Brown." He was inducted into the Brown Bears athletic Hall of Fame in 1987.

== NFL career ==
Jordan was selected by the Minnesota Vikings in the seventh round (179th overall) in the 1982 NFL draft. He played 13 seasons for the Vikings and was selected to six consecutive Pro Bowls from 1986 through 1991. He finished his NFL career with 498 receptions for 6,307 yards and 28 touchdowns. Viking head coach Jerry Burns praised Jordan's work ethic, noting that "no one on the Vikings works harder." During Jordan's years with the team, the Vikings won three NFC Central division titles, made the NFL playoffs six times, and reached the 1987 NFC Championship game, which they lost 17-10 to the Washington Redskins. The Redskins went on to win Super Bowl XXII.

Jordan's career statistics compare favorably to several Pro Football Hall of Fame inductees. For example, Jordan's 498 career receptions and 6,307 career yards exceeds Mike Ditka's 427 career receptions and 5,812 career yards, Dave Casper's 378 career receptions and 5,216 career yards, and John Mackey's 331 career receptions and 5,236 career yards.

Jordan still holds the Vikings all-time single-game receiving record for tight ends. During a game against the Washington Redskins on November 2, 1986, Jordan caught 6 passes for 179 yards and a touchdown. No Vikings tight end has ever caught for more yards in a single game.

== NFL career statistics ==
Legend
**Bold**	Career high

=== Regular season ===
Year	Team	Games		Receiving				
Year	Team	GP	GS	Rec	Yds	Avg	Lng	TD
1982	MIN	9	1	3	42	14.0	29	0
1983	MIN	13	2	15	212	14.1	28	2
1984	MIN	14	14	38	414	10.9	26	2
1985	MIN	16	16	**68**	795	11.7	32	0
1986	MIN	16	16	58	**859**	**14.8**	**68**	**6**
1987	MIN	12	12	35	490	14.0	38	2
1988	MIN	16	16	57	756	13.3	38	5
1989	MIN	16	15	35	506	14.5	34	3
1990	MIN	16	16	45	636	14.1	38	3
1991	MIN	16	16	57	638	11.2	25	2
1992	MIN	14	12	28	394	14.1	60	2
1993	MIN	14	12	56	542	9.7	53	1
1994	MIN	4	1	3	23	7.7	10	0
		176	149	498	6,307	12.7	68	28

=== Postseason ===
Year	Team	Games		Receiving				
Year	Team	GP	GS	Rec	Yds	Avg	Lng	TD
1982	MIN	2	0	2	11	5.5	8	0
1987	MIN	3	3	5	73	14.6	**36**	**1**
1988	MIN	2	2	4	63	15.8	23	0
1989	MIN	1	1	**9**	**149**	**16.6**	27	0
1992	MIN	1	1	0	0	0.0	0	0
1993	MIN	1	0	4	31	7.8	15	0
1994	MIN	1	1	2	16	8.0	11	0
		11	8	26	343	13.2	36	1

== Post-football career ==
After his retirement from the NFL, Jordan worked as a civil engineer for M.A. Mortenson of Minneapolis, Minnesota. He was elected to the Brown University Board of Trustees in 1993.

On October 25, 2019, the Minnesota Vikings inducted Jordan into the Vikings Ring of Honor. In announcing Jordan's selection, the Vikings co-owner and team president Mark Wilf noted that "Steve Jordan's impact on the Vikings has carried on past his career on the field. As great a player as Steve was, he's just as great an ambassador for the Vikings and the game of football. He is a positive role model to young players about the value of education and using your platform as an NFL star for good."

Upon his induction to the Ring of Honor, Jordan said, "I look back, and it's really good that something like this can happen, someone like me, who comes out of a small school can come to the Vikings and have a successful career, not just on the field but off the field."

== Personal life ==
Jordan lives in Eagan, Minnesota. His son, Cameron Jordan, currently plays defensive end for the New Orleans Saints. He and his wife Anita had two more children, son Geoffrey and daughter Stephanie. Jordan is also the father-in-law of German football player Kasim Edebali.
