= Wade Wilson (American football) =

American football player and coach (1959–2019)

No. 11, 18, 16
- Position: Quarterback

Personal information
- Born: February 1, 1959; Greenville, Texas, U.S.
- Died: February 1, 2019 (aged 60); Coppell, Texas, U.S.
- Listed height: 6 ft 3 in (1.91 m)
- Listed weight: 210 lb (95 kg)

Career information
- High school: Commerce (Commerce, Texas)
- College: East Texas State (1977–1980)
- NFL draft: 1981: 8th round, 210th overall pick

Career history

Playing
- Minnesota Vikings (1981–1991); Atlanta Falcons (1992); New Orleans Saints (1993–1994); Dallas Cowboys (1995–1997); Oakland Raiders (1998–1999)

Coaching
- Dallas Cowboys (2000–2002) Quarterbacks coach; Chicago Bears (2004–2006) Quarterbacks coach; Dallas Cowboys (2007–2017) Quarterbacks coach

Awards and highlights
- Super Bowl champion (XXX); Pro Bowl (1988); NFL completion percentage leader (1988); LSC MVP (1980); NAIA First-team All-American (1980); 2× First-team All-LSC (1979, 1980)

Career NFL statistics
- Passing attempts: 2,428
- Passing completions: 1,391
- Completion percentage: 57.3%
- TD–INT: 99–102
- Passing yards: 17,283
- Passer rating: 75.6
- Stats at Pro Football Reference

Charles Wade Wilson (February 1, 1959 – February 1, 2019) was an American professional football player who was a quarterback in the National Football League (NFL). He played for the Minnesota Vikings, Atlanta Falcons, New Orleans Saints, Dallas Cowboys, and Oakland Raiders in a seventeen-year NFL career from 1981 to 1998. He was quarterbacks coach for the Dallas Cowboys from 2000 to 2002 and from 2007 to 2017, and also for the Chicago Bears from 2004 to 2006. He played college football for East Texas State Lions (now East Texas A&M), where he was an NAIA All-American quarterback and led the Lions to the NAIA national semifinals during the 1980 season.

== Early life ==
Wilson was born in Greenville, Texas, and lived in Wolfe City, Texas and Quitman, Texas before moving to Commerce, Texas where he grew up. The son of a football coach, Wilson became a standout quarterback and punter at Commerce High School, after initially quitting the team during his sophomore season.

As a senior, he led the Tigers to a 10-win season and a district championship, while running a wishbone offense and receiving All-district honors. He graduated from Commerce High School in 1977.

== College career ==
Wilson accepted a football scholarship offer from East Texas State University (now East Texas A&M University). As a freshman in 1977, he backed up Lions All-American quarterback Terry Skinner. He also was the team's punter, averaging 38.5 yards.

As a sophomore in 1978, he was named the starting quarterback. As a junior in 1979, he received first-team All-Lone Star Conference honors.

As a senior in 1980, he completed 116-of-227 passes for 1,978 yards and 19 touchdowns, while the Lions finished tied for first with Angelo State University among NAIA schools in the Lone Star Conference. The Lions were selected for the NAIA national playoffs as the 8th-ranked team in the country. Wilson and the Lions upset a top-ranked Central Arkansas University Bears team in the national quarter finals, but bowed out to Elon College, the eventual national champion, in the semifinal round. The Lions finished 6th in the country, with Wilson earning the first-team All-Lone Stone Conference and first-team NAIA All-American recognition.

Wilson graduated in 1981 with a degree in Business Management. He finished his college career with 4,616 passing yards, 32 touchdowns and an 18–14–1 record.

== Professional career ==
=== Minnesota Vikings ===
Wilson was selected by the Minnesota Vikings in the eighth round (210th overall) of the 1981 NFL draft. As a rookie, he appeared in three games while being on the active roster for all 16 contests. Wilson saw his first action against the Oakland Raiders, replacing an injured Steve Dils.

In 1982, Wilson did not appear in any game during the strike-shortened season. In 1983, he only played in the season finale against the Cincinnati Bengals, contributing to the 20–14 victory in his first career start.

In 1984, Wilson started five out of eight contests.

In 1985, he was diagnosed with type 1 diabetes. He appeared in 4 games, with his only start coming in place of an injured Tommy Kramer against the Philadelphia Eagles, in which he led the team to one of the greatest comebacks in franchise history. The Eagles held a 23–0 advantage with 8:23 minutes to play. Wilson directed 3 scoring drives, after being benched at halftime in favor of rookie 3rd-string quarterback Steve Bono, but after Bono only completed one pass out of ten, Wilson was put back in the game with less than 12 minutes remaining, throwing 3 touchdown passes to achieve a 28–23 victory.

In 1986, he appeared in 9 games, including 3 starts in place of an injured Kramer. He was named NFC Offensive Player of the Week in the season finale 33–17 win against the New Orleans Saints, after replacing an injured Kramer and having the best game of his career at the time, throwing for 361 yards and 3 touchdowns.

He was mostly the backup quarterback until 1987, when Kramer started 5 games to Wilson's 7 contests, including the playoffs. He was named NFC Offensive Player of the Week after the 21–16 win against the Los Angeles Rams, in which he threw a 41-yard game winning touchdown to wide receiver Hassan Jones with less than a minute to play. He threw for 3 touchdowns in the season opener against the Detroit Lions and in the Week 12 game against the Chicago Bears. He led the Vikings in rushing in the Week 14 game against the Detroit Lions with 8 carries for 55 yards and in the season finale against the Washington Redskins with 10 carries for 75 yards. He guided the team to the NFC Championship Game after upsetting the top-seeded 13–2 San Francisco 49ers in the divisional round of the playoffs, finally succumbing 17–10 to the eventual Super Bowl XXII champion Washington Redskins.

In 1988, Wilson started 10 games to Kramer's 6 contests, while missing 2 games with a separated shoulder. He was named NFC Offensive Player of the Week after the 49–20 win against the Tampa Bay Buccaneers, completing 22-of-30 passes for 335 yards, and 3 touchdowns. He was named NFC Offensive Player of the Month for November, when he completed 73-of-112 passes (65.1%) for 1,009 yards, 5 touchdowns and 2 interceptions, while leading the Vikings to a 4–0 record. His best game came in a 44–17 win against the Detroit Lions in Week 10, completing 28-of-35 passes (80%) for a career-high 391 yards, 2 touchdowns and one interception, including a stretch in which he had 14 straight completions. He finished a Pro Bowl season, completing 204-of-332 passes for 2,746 yards, 15 touchdowns and 9 interceptions, ranking as the NFC leader with a 91.5 passer rating.

In 1989, he started 12 out of 14 games, missing 2 contests with a finger injury. He led the team in pass attempts (362), completions (194), passing yards (2,543) and passing touchdowns (9) for the third consecutive year. He had a season-high 42 attempts in the 7–38 loss against the Chicago Bears. He led the team in rushing with 8 carries for 55 yards in the 24–10 win against the Tampa Bay Buccaneers.

In 1990, he started the first 3 games before injuring his right thumb against the Chicago Bears. Rich Gannon replaced him while he was out. Wilson returned to action in the second half of the 13–26 loss against the Tampa Bay Buccaneers in Week 15, throwing for 374 yards, including a career-long 75-yard touchdown pass to Hassan Jones. He started the next game against the Los Angeles Raiders before suffering a separated right shoulder that forced him to miss the season finale.

In 1991, Wilson started the first 5 games, throwing for 825 yards with 3 touchdowns and 10 interceptions, before losing the starting position to Gannon. The Vikings released him on July 8, 1992. He finished his Vikings career completing 1,391 passes on 2,428 attempts for 17,283 yards, 99 touchdowns and 102 interceptions.

=== Atlanta Falcons ===
On July 13, 1992, Wilson was signed by the Atlanta Falcons. He appeared in 9 games and started the last three throwing for 1,366 yards, 13 touchdowns and 4 interceptions. In a game against the Tampa Bay Buccaneers on December 13, 1992, he became the first Falcons quarterback to throw five touchdown passes in a game.

=== New Orleans Saints ===
On April 12, 1993, Wilson signed with the New Orleans Saints. He earned the starter job over Steve Walsh and although he directed the Saints to a 5–0 winning streak, the team only won three more games to finish with an 8–8 record, which would be Wilson's last season as a regular starter.

In Week 16 of the 1993 season, Wilson was struggling against the New York Giants in a game on Monday Night Football. He suffered a knee injury during the game and the fans at the Superdome began cheering when he was injured. Saints head coach Jim Mora called the fans who cheered Wilson's injury, "Sick, sick, sick people. Mentally sick."

On March 18, 1994, the Saints waived Wilson. Wilson was re-signed on April 13. He appeared in four games as the backup quarterback during the season. He was released on March 20, 1995.

=== Dallas Cowboys ===
On May 22, 1995, Wilson was signed by the Dallas Cowboys. He was a part of the Super Bowl XXX winning team. Wilson only started one game during his three seasons with the Cowboys, when the team played its backups in the 1996 season finale against the Washington Redskins, resulting in a 37–10 loss.

=== Oakland Raiders ===
On July 6, 1998, Wilson signed with the Oakland Raiders. After Jeff George suffered a groin injury, backup Donald Hollas struggled in the second half of the season and also suffered a wrist injury in his last start against the Miami Dolphins, giving Wilson the opportunity to start the last three games, passing for 425 yards, five touchdowns, four interceptions, and producing a 1–2 record.

In 1999, Wilson returned to the third-string quarterback role once again. He was limited with a groin injury during the season and did not appear in any game. Wilson announced his retirement on December 30, at the age of 40.

== NFL career statistics ==
Year	Team	Games		Passing							
Year	Team	GP	GS	Cmp	Att	Pct	Yds	Avg	TD	Int	Rtg
1981	MIN	3	0	6	13	46.2	48	3.7	0	2	16.3
1982	MIN	0	0	DNP							
1983	MIN	1	1	16	28	57.1	124	4.4	1	2	50.3
1984	MIN	8	5	102	195	52.3	1,019	5.2	5	11	52.5
1985	MIN	4	1	33	60	55.0	404	6.7	3	3	71.8
1986	MIN	9	3	80	143	55.9	1,165	8.1	7	5	84.4
1987	MIN	12	7	140	264	53.0	2,106	8.0	14	13	76.7
1988	MIN	14	10	204	332	61.4	2,746	8.3	15	9	91.5
1989	MIN	14	12	194	362	53.6	2,543	7.0	9	12	70.5
1990	MIN	6	4	82	146	56.2	1,155	7.9	9	8	79.6
1991	MIN	5	5	72	122	59.0	825	6.8	3	10	53.5
1992	ATL	9	3	111	163	68.1	1,366	8.4	13	4	110.1
1993	NO	14	14	221	388	57.0	2,457	6.3	12	15	70.1
1994	NO	4	0	20	28	71.4	172	6.1	0	0	87.2
1995	DAL	7	0	38	57	66.7	391	6.9	1	3	70.1
1996	DAL	3	1	8	18	44.4	79	4.4	0	1	34.3
1997	DAL	7	0	12	21	57.1	115	5.5	0	0	72.5
1998	OAK	5	3	52	88	59.1	568	6.5	7	4	85.8
Career		125	69	1,391	2,428	57.3	17,283	7.1	99	102	75.6

== Coaching career ==
Wilson was the Dallas Cowboys quarterback coach from 2000 to 2002. He became the Chicago Bears quarterbacks coach from 2004 until 2006, while reaching Super Bowl XLI and contributing to Rex Grossman having his best professional season.

On February 22, 2007, he was re-hired by the Cowboys, where he coached Tony Romo and Dak Prescott among other quarterbacks. He was one of the advocates who convinced the team to draft Prescott.

On September 1, 2007, Wilson was suspended five games and fined $100,000 for purchasing and using performance-enhancing drugs. In his own defense, Wilson said that the drug HGH was used to help his problem with diabetes. However, NFL Commissioner Roger Goodell seemed to sidestep this defense, saying, "First of all, I'm not going to get into the personal situations of why Wade was taking it, but that's not an accurate point." In 2016, he had the second toe on his right foot amputated because of an infection caused by complications from his diabetes condition.

The Cowboys decided to part ways with Wilson following the 2017 season.

== Death ==
Wilson died due to complications from Type 1 Diabetes, a disease he had for almost 30 years, at his home in Coppell, Texas on his 60th birthday.
