= Jeff Womack =

American football player (born 1963)

No. 33
- Position: Running back

Personal information
- Born: June 26, 1963 (age 63); McMinnville, Tennessee, U.S.
- Listed height: 5 ft 9 in (1.75 m)
- Listed weight: 188 lb (85 kg)

Career information
- High school: Warren County
- College: Memphis
- NFL draft: 1987: undrafted

Career history
- Minnesota Vikings (1987)

Career NFL statistics
- Rushing yards: 20
- Rushing average: 2.2
- Receptions: 5
- Receiving yards: 46
- Touchdowns: 1
- Stats at Pro Football Reference

Jeffrey Allen Womack (born June 26, 1963) is an American former professional football player who was a running back for the Minnesota Vikings of the National Football League (NFL). He played college football for the Memphis Tigers.
