= Jamie Fitzgerald (American football) =

American football player (born 1965)

No. 29
- Position: Defensive back

Personal information
- Born: April 30, 1965 (age 61); Spokane, Washington, U.S.
- Listed height: 6 ft 0 in (1.83 m)
- Listed weight: 180 lb (82 kg)

Career information
- High school: Gonzaga Prep (Spokane)
- College: Idaho State
- NFL draft: 1986: undrafted

Career history
- Minnesota Vikings (1987–1989); Edmonton Eskimos (1990)*; New York/New Jersey Knights (1991)*
- * Offseason or practice squad member only

Awards and highlights
- Second-team All-Big Sky (1985)

Career NFL statistics
- Games played: 2
- Stats at Pro Football Reference

Edgar James Fitzgerald (born April 30, 1965) is an American former professional football player who was a defensive back for the Minnesota Vikings of the National Football League (NFL) in 1987. He played college football for the Idaho State Bengals.

== Early life and education ==
Fitzgerald was born on April 30, 1965, in Spokane, Washington. He attended Gonzaga Preparatory School there, and was a member of their State AAA championship football team. He was also a nationally-ranked downhill skier and a seven-foot high jumper while in high school.

Fitzgerald later played college football for the Division I-AA Idaho State Bengals for two seasons. In his two seasons, Fitzgerald played as a defensive back and return specialist, and was described as a leader of the team's defense. As a sophomore in 1985, he led the team in tackles with 92 total, returned five interceptions, a team sophomore record, led Idaho State with 9.3 yards per punt return, and made 372 punt return yards, a mark which was 5th all-time in team history as of 2010. Fitzgerald was named to the Second-team All-Big Sky Conference. In a game against Northern Colorado, he returned a punt 62 yards for a touchdown as the Bengals won 44–17. Fitzgerald left the team prior to the 1986 season, after getting into a dispute with coach Jim Koetter.

== Professional career ==
In 1987, after being out of the sport for a year, Fitzgerald was signed by the Minnesota Vikings of the National Football League (NFL) during the NFLPA strike. He wore number 29, and appeared in two games as a substitute before being released at the end of the strike. The Vikings managed to make the playoffs that season, and Fitzgerald and the other replacement players received a bonus despite losing the games they played. He was invited back to the team in training camp in 1988 and 1989, being given contracts each year, but never made the final roster.

Fitzgerald signed with the Edmonton Eskimos of the Canadian Football League (CFL) on March 21, 1990. He was released on June 25, 1990, before the start of the 1990 CFL season.

In 1991, Fitzgerald was selected by New York in the fifth round with the 42nd pick of the World League of American Football draft, but did not play for the team.

== Later life ==
After his retirement from football, Fitzgerald was a defensive coordinator at Lake City High School in Coeur d'Alene, Idaho.
