= Ted Million =

American football player (born 1963)

No. 64
- Position: Guard

Personal information
- Born: May 6, 1963 (age 63); U.S.
- Listed height: 6 ft 4 in (1.93 m)
- Listed weight: 260 lb (118 kg)

Career information
- High school: Norman
- College: Duke
- NFL draft: 1986: undrafted

Career history
- Minnesota Vikings (1987)
- Stats at Pro Football Reference

Tedder Clark Million (born May 6, 1963) is an American former professional football player who was a guard for the Minnesota Vikings of National Football League (NFL). He played college football for Duke.
