= Dale Dawson =

American football player (1964–2018)

No. 4
- Position: Placekicker

Personal information
- Born: November 2, 1964; Moultrie, Georgia, U.S.
- Died: May 25, 2018 (aged 53); West Palm Beach, Florida, U.S.
- Listed height: 6 ft 0 in (1.83 m)
- Listed weight: 213 lb (97 kg)

Career information
- High school: North Shore
- College: Eastern Kentucky
- NFL draft: 1987: undrafted

Career history
- Minnesota Vikings (1987); San Francisco 49ers (1988)*; Philadelphia Eagles (1988); Green Bay Packers (1988)
- * Offseason or practice squad member only

Career NFL statistics
- Field goals made: 4
- Field goal attempts: 11
- Field goal %: 36.4
- Longest field goal: 34
- Stats at Pro Football Reference

Dale Anthony Dawson (November 2, 1964 – May 25, 2018) was an American professional football player who played as a placekicker in the National Football League (NFL) for the Minnesota Vikings, Philadelphia Eagles and Green Bay Packers.

== Biography ==
Dawson was born in Moultrie, Georgia, and attended Eastern Kentucky University.

Dawson spent the 1987 NFL season with the Minnesota Vikings. He split the following season between the Philadelphia Eagles and the Green Bay Packers. He would be the last Packer to wear #4 before the arrival of Brett Favre.

He died on May 25, 2018, at the age of 53.
