= Clifton Eley =

American football player (born 1961)

No. 87
- Position: Tight end

Personal information
- Born: June 21, 1961 (age 65); Clarksdale, Mississippi, U.S.
- Listed height: 6 ft 5 in (1.96 m)
- Listed weight: 230 lb (104 kg)

Career information
- High school: Clarksdale (MS)
- College: Mississippi State
- NFL draft: 1985: undrafted

Career history
- Minnesota Vikings (1987)
- Stats at Pro Football Reference

Clifton T. Eley (born June 21, 1961) is an American former professional football tight end who played one season. He played for the Minnesota Vikings in 1987 as a replacement player.
