= Don Bramlett =

American football player (1962–2023)

No. 95
- Position: Defensive tackle

Personal information
- Born: October 5, 1962; Memphis, Tennessee, U.S.
- Died: February 1, 2023 (aged 60); Memphis, Tennessee, U.S.
- Listed height: 6 ft 2 in (1.88 m)
- Listed weight: 270 lb (122 kg)

Career information
- High school: Evangelical Christian
- College: Memphis, Carson–Newman
- NFL draft: 1987: undrafted

Career history
- Minnesota Vikings (1987)
- Stats at Pro Football Reference

Donald Kirk Bramlett (October 5, 1962 – February 1, 2023) was an American professional football player who was a defensive tackle for the Minnesota Vikings in the National Football League (NFL). He played college football at University of Memphis.

Bramlett died on February 1, 2023, at the age of 60.
