= Steve Ache =

American football player (born 1962)

No. 53
- Position: Linebacker

Personal information
- Born: March 16, 1962; Syracuse, New York
- Died: September 20, 2022 (aged 60); Belleville, Illinois, U.S.
- Listed height: 6 ft 3 in (1.91 m)
- Listed weight: 229 lb (104 kg)

Career information
- High school: Mascoutah (Mascoutah, Illinois)
- College: Southwest Missouri State
- NFL draft: 1985: undrafted

Career history
- Minnesota Vikings (1987)

Career NFL statistics
- Games played: 3
- Games started: 0
- Stats at Pro Football Reference

Stephen J. Ache (March 16, 1962 - September 20, 2022) was an American professional football player who played as a linebacker. Born in Syracuse, New York, he attended Southwest Missouri State before playing in the National Football League (NFL) for the Minnesota Vikings during the 1987 NFLPA strike.
