= Larry Brown (wide receiver) =

American football player (born 1963)

No. 86
- Position: Wide receiver

Personal information
- Born: September 4, 1963 (age 63); Miami, Florida, U.S.
- Listed height: 5 ft 11 in (1.80 m)
- Listed weight: 180 lb (82 kg)

Career information
- High school: American Senior
- College: Minnesota State
- NFL draft: 1986: undrafted

Career history
- Seattle Seahawks (1986)*; Minnesota Vikings (1987)
- * Offseason or practice squad member only
- Stats at Pro Football Reference

Lawrence Brown (born September 4, 1963) is an American former professional football player who was a wide receiver in the National Football League (NFL). Born in Miami, Florida, he attended American Senior High School and played college football for the Mankato State Mavericks. He played one game in the NFL for the Minnesota Vikings during the 1987 strike, but failed to register a catch.
