= Phil Frye =

American football player (born 1958)

No. 37
- Position: Running back

Personal information
- Born: December 20, 1958 (age 67); Washington, D.C., U.S.
- Listed height: 5 ft 11 in (1.80 m)
- Listed weight: 180 lb (82 kg)

Career information
- High school: Rochester (MN) John Marshall
- College: Cal Lutheran

Career history
- 1987: Minnesota Vikings
- Stats at Pro Football Reference

Philip Todd Frye (born December 20, 1958) is an American former professional football player who was a running back for the Minnesota Vikings of the National Football League (NFL) in 1987. He played college football for the Cal Lutheran Kingsmen.

In the early 1980s, Frye was a running back at California Lutheran University, where he was a 1983 graduate. He was later a university football coach for Cal Lutheran (assistant football strength coach), Hawaii (football head strength coach), and UCLA (head strength and conditioning coach). He has been a strength and conditioning coach at EXOS since 2014.
