= Ron Daugherty =

American football player (born 1958)

No. 82
- Position: Wide receiver

Personal information
- Born: March 17, 1958 (age 68); St. Petersburg, Florida
- Listed height: 6 ft 3 in (1.91 m)
- Listed weight: 185 lb (84 kg)

Career information
- College: Northeastern Illinois

Career history
- Chicago Bears (1984)*; Minnesota Vikings (1987)
- * Offseason or practice squad member only
- Stats at Pro Football Reference

Ronald Daugherty (born March 17, 1958) is an American former football wide receiver who played for the Minnesota Vikings of the National Football League (NFL). He played college football at the Northeastern Illinois University.
