= Rickey Parks =

American football player (born 1964)

No. 81
- Position: Wide receiver

Personal information
- Born: February 19, 1964 (age 62)
- Listed height: 6 ft 1 in (1.85 m)
- Listed weight: 179 lb (81 kg)

Career information
- College: Arkansas–Pine Bluff
- NFL draft: 1986: undrafted

Career history
- Minnesota Vikings (1987)
- Stats at Pro Football Reference

Richard Parks (born February 19, 1964) is an American former football wide receiver who played for the Minnesota Vikings of the National Football League (NFL). He played college football at University of Arkansas at Pine Bluff.
