= Dave Bruno =

American football player (born 1963)

David Bruno
No. 13
- Position: Punter

Personal information
- Born: March 19, 1963 (age 63); Chicago, Illinois, U.S.
- Listed height: 6 ft 1 in (1.85 m)
- Listed weight: 235 lb (107 kg)

Career information
- High school: Leyden Township
- College: Moraine Valley Community College
- NFL draft: 1986: undrafted

Career history
- Minnesota Vikings (1987)

Career NFL statistics
- Games played: 2
- Punts: 13
- Punting yards: 464
- Stats at Pro Football Reference

David Bruno (born March 19, 1963) is an American former professional football player who was a punter for one season with the Minnesota Vikings of the National Football League (NFL). He is the only Moraine Valley Community College attendee to play professional football.

== Early life and education ==
Bruno was born on March 19, 1963, in Chicago, Illinois. He went to Leyden Township High School before attending Moraine Valley Community College. He played for their team, the Marauders (now Cyclones), an NJCAA team. In 1984, against Triton, he had an 89-yard punt. After college he played in several Chicago-area minor leagues.

== Professional career ==
In 1987, Bruno was signed by the NFL's Minnesota Vikings as a replacement player. He played two games before being released, after an unimpressive 13 punts for 464 yards (35.69 average). After his first game, against the Green Bay Packers, a journalist sarcastically wrote about his punts saying "Or take Minnesota punter Dave Bruno, who got off booming kicks of 16, 18, and 24 yards." He had 8 punts for 274 yards against the Packers, with an 34.25 average. His second and final game was against the Chicago Bears, he posted slightly better stats, 5 punts for 190 yards (38.00 average), but was still below average. He was released before the next game and did not play afterwards. In his two games, he had 13 punts for 464 yards. He also had one touchback and a long of 53 yards.
