= Timothy Starks =

American football player (born 1963)

No. 34
- Position: Defensive back

Personal information
- Born: December 30, 1963 (age 62); Mobile, Alabama, U.S.
- Listed height: 5 ft 9 in (1.75 m)
- Listed weight: 175 lb (79 kg)

Career information
- High school: Cleveland Heights (OH)
- College: Kent State

Career history
- Minnesota Vikings (1987)

Career statistics
- Games played: 1
- Stats at Pro Football Reference

Timothy Jerome Starks (born December 30, 1963) is an American former professional football player who was a defensive back for the Minnesota Vikings in 1987 when he was 24 years old. He played college football for the Kent State Golden Flashes. He is 5'9" and weighs 175lbs. He was born on December 30, 1963, in Mobile, Alabama.
