= Rick Fenney =

American football player (born 1964)

No. 31
- Position: Running back

Personal information
- Born: December 7, 1964 (age 61); Everett, Washington, U.S.
- Listed height: 6 ft 1 in (1.85 m)
- Listed weight: 242 lb (110 kg)

Career information
- High school: Snohomish (Snohomish, Washington)
- College: Washington
- NFL draft: 1987: 8th round, 211th overall pick

Career history
- Minnesota Vikings (1987–1991)

Awards and highlights
- Second-team All-Pac-10 (1985)

Career NFL statistics
- Rushing yards: 1,508
- Rushing average: 4.2
- Receptions: 71
- Receiving yards: 628
- Total touchdowns: 13
- Stats at Pro Football Reference

Ricky Dale Fenney (born December 7, 1964) is an American former professional football player who was a running back in the National Football League (NFL). He played college football for the Washington Huskies. Selected in the eighth round of the 1987 NFL draft, he played five seasons for the Minnesota Vikings (1987–1991).

Born in Everett, Washington, Fenney graduated from Snohomish High School and played college football at the University of Washington in Seattle; he scored the final touchdown in the Huskies' Orange Bowl victory over Oklahoma in January 1985.

Pre-draft measurables
Height	Weight	Arm length	Hand span	40-yard dash	10-yard split	20-yard split	20-yard shuttle	Vertical jump	Broad jump	Bench press
6 ft 2 1/4 in (1.89 m)	246 lb (112 kg)	31 1/2 in (0.80 m)	9 3/4 in (0.25 m)	4.79 s	1.62 s	2.76 s	4.46 s	29.5 in (0.75 m)	8 ft 5 in (2.57 m)	28 reps
All values from NFL Combine

Fenney became a full-time financial planner after his retirement from the NFL. While working as a broker for Merrill Lynch, he started an investment fund and solicited investments from family and friends. Fenney covered up his losses and continued to solicit more cash from investors. Having lost $2.2 million of investor money, Fenney in 2004 was indicted on wire fraud charges for misleading investors. He was sentenced to 37 months in prison and was ordered to pay restitution. After serving his sentence at Federal Correctional Institution, Sheridan, he was released to a halfway house in Phoenix.
