= List of NFL career kickoff return yards leaders =

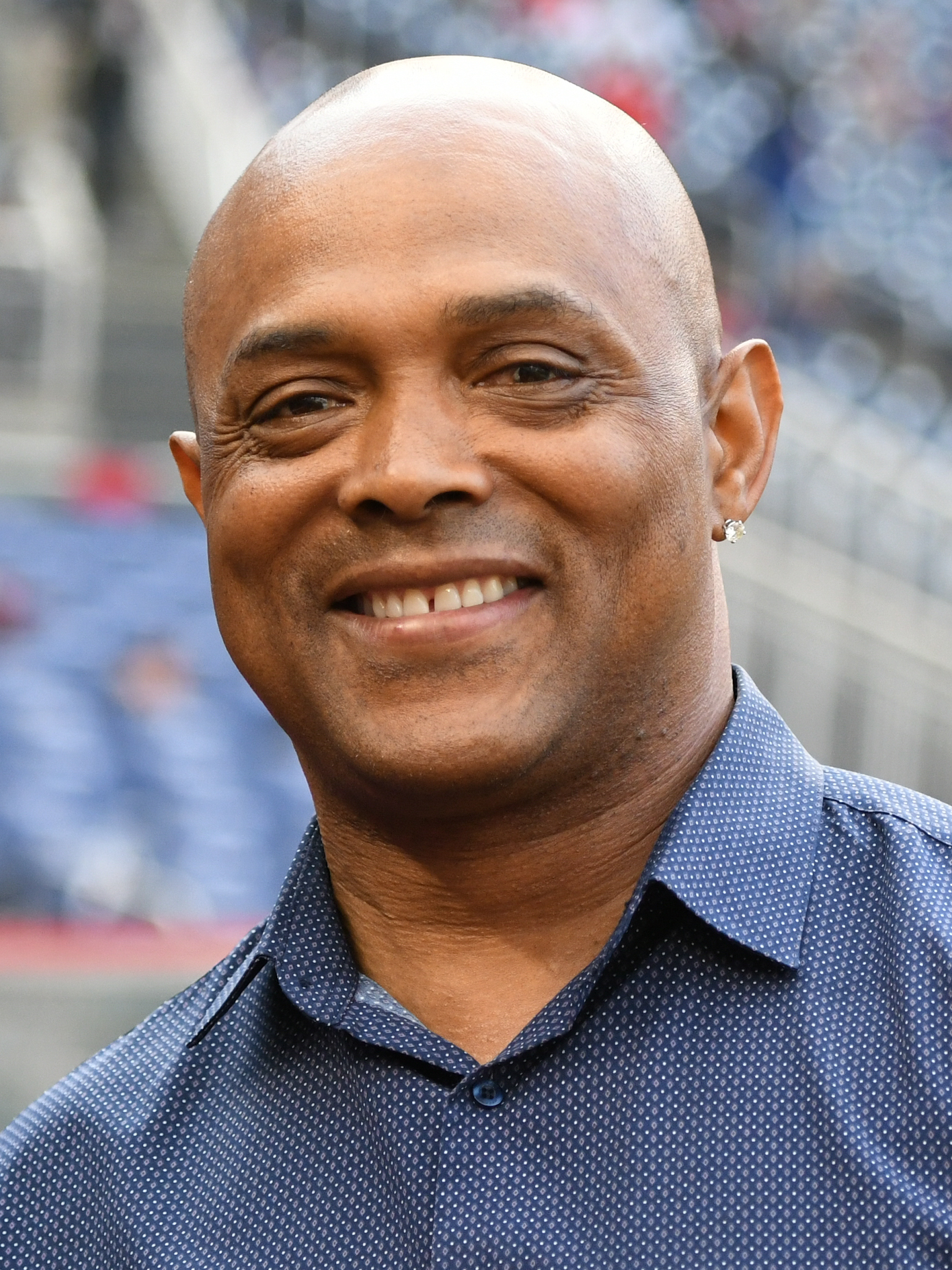
Brian Mitchell is the all-time leader in kickoff return yards and returns.

This list shows the top National Football League kickoff returners based on their career kickoff return yards within 5,000 yards.

Brian Mitchell is the all-time leader with 14,014 kickoff return yards over 14 seasons. He also holds the record for most kickoff returns with 607. For returners with at least 5,000 yards, Cordarrelle Patterson holds the record for most yards per return with 29.0; Gale Sayers holds the all-time record for all kickoff returners with 30.6. Patterson also holds the record for most kickoff return touchdowns with 9.

In comparison, no punt returner has ever logged 5,000 yards, with the all-time leader in punt return yards being Mitchell with 4,999 yards.

== Career leaders ==
Key
^	Inducted into the Pro Football Hall of Fame
*	Denotes player who is still active

Based on 5,000 career kickoff return yards

Through 2025 season

Rank	Player	Pos.	Team(s) by season	Returns	Yards	Average	Ref
1	Brian Mitchell	RB	Washington Redskins (1990–1999); Philadelphia Eagles (2000–2002); New York Giants (2003)	607	14,014	23.1	
2	Allen Rossum	DB	Philadelphia Eagles (1998–1999); Green Bay Packers (2000–2001); Atlanta Falcons (2002–2006); Pittsburgh Steelers (2007); San Francisco 49ers (2008–2009); Dallas Cowboys (2009)	514	11,947	23.2	
3	Josh Cribbs	WR	Cleveland Browns (2005–2012); New York Jets (2013); Indianapolis Colts (2014)	426	11,113	26.1	
4	Mel Gray	RB/WR	New Orleans Saints (1986–1988); Detroit Lions (1989–1994); Houston / Tennessee Oilers (1995–1997); Philadelphia Eagles (1997)	421	10,250	24.3	
5	Dante Hall	WR	Kansas City Chiefs (2000–2006); St. Louis Rams (2007–2008)	426	10,136	23.8	
6	Glyn Milburn	RB/WR	Denver Broncos (1993–1995); Detroit Lions (1996–1997); Chicago Bears (1998–2001); San Diego Chargers (2001)	407	9,788	24	
7	Michael Bates	RB/WR	Seattle Seahawks (1993–1995); Carolina Panthers (1995, 1996–2000); Cleveland Browns (1995); Washington Redskins (2001); Carolina Panthers (2002–2003); New York Jets (2003); Dallas Cowboys (2003)	373	9,110	24.4	
8	Darren Sproles	RB	San Diego Chargers (2005–2010); New Orleans Saints (2011–2013); Philadelphia Eagles (2014–2019)	332	8,352	25.2	
9	Cordarrelle Patterson	RB/WR	Minnesota Vikings (2013–2016); Oakland Raiders (2017); New England Patriots (2018); Chicago Bears (2019–2020); Atlanta Falcons (2021–2023); Pittsburgh Steelers (2024)	284	8,229	29.0	
10	Desmond Howard	WR	Washington Redskins (1992–1994); Jacksonville Jaguars (1995); Green Bay Packers (1996, 1999); Oakland Raiders (1997–1998); Detroit Lions (1999–2002)	359	7,959	22.2	
11	Leon Washington	RB	New York Jets (2006–2009); Seattle Seahawks (2010–2012); New England Patriots (2013); Tennessee Titans (2013–2014)	292	7,553	25.9	
12	Devin Hester^	WR	Chicago Bears (2006–2013); Atlanta Falcons (2014–2015); Baltimore Ravens (2016); Seattle Seahawks (2016)	295	7,333	24.9	
13	Kevin Williams	WR	Dallas Cowboys (1993–1996); Arizona Cardinals (1997); Buffalo Bills (1998–1999); San Francisco 49ers (2000)	322	7,309	22.7	
14	Tyrone Hughes	DB	New Orleans Saints (1993–1996)); Chicago Bears (1997); Dallas Cowboys (1998)	283	6,999	24.7	
15	Ron Smith	DB	Chicago Bears (1965, (1970–1972); Atlanta Falcons (1966–1967); Los Angeles Rams (1968–1969); San Diego Chargers (1973); Oakland Raiders (1974)	275	6,922	25.2	
16	Ted Ginn Jr.	WR	Miami Dolphins (2007–2009); San Francisco 49ers (2010–2012); Carolina Panthers (2013, 2015–2016); Arizona Cardinals (2014); New Orleans Saints (2017–2019); Chicago Bears (2020)	307	6,899	22.5	
17	Andre Roberts	WR	Arizona Cardinals (2010–2013); Washington Redskins (2014–2015); Detroit Lions (2016); Atlanta Falcons (2017); New York Jets (2018); Buffalo Bills (2019–2020); Houston Texans (2021); Los Angeles Chargers (2021); Carolina Panthers (2022)	260	6,751	26	
18	Chris Carr	DB	Oakland Raiders (2005–2007); Tennessee Titans (2008); Baltimore Ravens (2009–2011); San Diego Chargers (2012); New Orleans Saints (2013)	256	6,276	24.5	
19	Michael Lewis	WR	New Orleans Saints (2001–2006); San Francisco 49ers (2007)	248	5,989	24.1	
20	Brandon Tate	WR	New England Patriots (2009–2010); Cincinnati Bengals (2011–2015); Buffalo Bills (2016–2017); New Orleans Saints (2018)	247	5,890	23.8	
21	Eric Metcalf	RB/WR	Cleveland Browns (1989–1994); Atlanta Falcons (1995–1996); San Diego Chargers (1997); Arizona Cardinals (1998); Carolina Panthers (1999); Washington Redskins (2001); Green Bay Packers (2002)	280	5,813	20.8	
22	Eddie Drummond	WR	Detroit Lions (2002–2006); Kansas City Chiefs (2007)	250	5,811	23.2	
23	Dave Meggett	RB	New York Giants (1989–1994); New England Patriots (1995–1997); New York Jets (1998)	252	5,566	22.1	
24	Abe Woodson	DB	San Francisco 49ers (1958–1964); St. Louis Cardinals (1965–1966)	193	5,538	28.7	
25	Corey Harris	DB	Houston Oilers (1992); Green Bay Packers (1992–1994); Seattle Seahawks (1995–1996); Miami Dolphins (1997); Baltimore Ravens (1998–2001); Detroit Lions (2002–2003)	238	5,528	23.2	
26	Rock Cartwright	RB	Washington Redskins (2002–2009); Oakland Raiders (2010–2011)	231	5,450	23.6	
27	Terrence McGee	CB/RS	Buffalo Bills (2003–2012)	207	5,450	26.3	
28	Tamarick Vanover	WR	Kansas City Chiefs (1995–1999); San Diego Chargers (2002)	226	5,422	24.0	
29	Dexter Carter	RB	San Francisco 49ers (1990–1994); New York Jets (1995); San Francisco 49ers (1995–1996)	250	5,412	21.6	
30	Bruce Harper	RB/RS	New York Jets (1977–1984)	243	5,407	22.3	
31	Chad Morton	RB	New Orleans Saints (2000); New York Jets (2001–2002); Washington Redskins (2003–2004); New York Giants (2005–2006)	229	5,401	23.6	
32	Terrence Wilkins	WR/KR	Indianapolis Colts (1999–2001); St. Louis Rams (2002); Indianapolis Colts (2006)	223	5,091	22.8	
33	Herschel Walker	RB	Dallas Cowboys (1986–1989); Minnesota Vikings (1989–1991); Philadelphia Eagles (1992–1994); New York Giants (1995); Dallas Cowboys (1996–1997)	215	5,084	23.6	

== See also ==
- NFL records (individual)
- List of NFL annual kickoff return yards leaders
- List of NFL annual punt return yards leaders
