= List of NFL annual punt return yards leaders =

In American football, a punt can be returned for yards. The number of punt return yards a player makes is a recorded statistic in football games. Statistics were not recorded until 1941.

This is a list of National Football League punt returners who have led the regular season in punt return yards each year. Alvin Haymond has led the NFL in punt return yards three times, more than any other punt returner. Emlen Tunnell, Dick Christy, Claude Gibson, Alvin Haymond, Rodger Bird, J. T. Smith, Vai Sikahema, Dave Meggett, and Darren Sproles are the only players to lead the league in punt return yards in consecutive years. The record for punt return yards in a season is currently held by Desmond Howard of the Green Bay Packers who had 875 yards in 1996. In addition to the overall National Football League (NFL) punt return yards leaders, league record books recognize the punt return yard leaders of the American Football League (AFL), which operated from 1960 to 1969 before being absorbed into the NFL in 1970. The NFL also recognizes the statistics of the All-America Football Conference, which operated from 1946 to 1949 before three of its teams were merged into the NFL, since 2025.

== Punt return yards leaders ==
According to Pro Football Reference and The Football Database.

Key
Symbol	Meaning
Leader	The player who recorded the most punt return yards in the NFL
Yards	The total number of punt return yards the player had
†	Pro Football Hall of Fame member
^	Active player
*	Player set the single-season punt return yards record
(#)	Denotes the number of times a player appears in this list

Season	Player	Punt return yards	Team
1941	Whizzer White	262*	Detroit Lions
1942	Bill Dudley	271*	Pittsburgh Steelers
1943	Frank Sinkwich	228	Brooklyn Dodgers
1944	Bob Davis	271	Boston Yanks
1945	Steve Bagarus	251	Washington Redskins
1946	Bill Dudley (2)	385	Pittsburgh Steelers
1947	Walt Slater	435	Pittsburgh Steelers
1948	George McAfee	417	Chicago Bears
1949	Vitamin Smith	427	Los Angeles Rams
1950	Billy Grimes	555*	Green Bay Packers
1951	Emlen Tunnell	489	New York Giants
1952	Emlen Tunnell (2)	411	New York Giants
1953	Woodley Lewis	267	Los Angeles Rams
1954	Veryl Switzer	306	Green Bay Packers
1955	Ollie Matson	245	Chicago Cardinals
1956	Carl Taseff	233	Baltimore Colts
1957	Bert Zagers	217	Washington Redskins
1958	Jon Arnett	217	Washington Redskins
1959	Billy Stacy	281	Chicago Cardinals
1960	Abe Woodson	174	San Francisco 49ers
1961	Johnny Sample	283	Pittsburgh Steelers
1962	Pat Studstill	457	Detroit Lions
1963	Tom Watkins	399	Detroit Lions
1964	Mel Renfro	418	Dallas Cowboys
1965	Alvin Haymond	403	Baltimore Colts
1966	Alvin Haymond (2)	403	Baltimore Colts
1967	Bob Hayes	276	Dallas Cowboys
1968	Chuck Latourette	345	St. Louis Cardinals
1969	Alvin Haymond (3)	403	Los Angeles Rams
1970	Bruce Taylor	516	San Francisco 49ers
1971	Jake Scott	318	Miami Dolphins
1972	Bruce Laird	303	Baltimore Colts
1973	Bill Thompson	366	Denver Broncos
1974	Lynn Swann	577*	Pittsburgh Steelers
1975	Neal Colzie	655*	Oakland Raiders
1976	Eddie Brown	646	Washington Redskins
1977	Rick Upchurch	653	Denver Broncos
1978	Jackie Wallace	618	Los Angeles Rams
1979	J.T. Smith	612	Kansas City Chiefs
1980	J.T. Smith (2)	581	Kansas City Chiefs
1981	LeRoy Irvin	615	Los Angeles Rams
1982	Leon Bright	325	New York Giants
1983	Greg Pruitt	666*	Los Angeles Raiders
1984	Louis Lipps	656	Pittsburgh Steelers
1985	Fulton Walker	692*	Los Angeles Raiders; Miami Dolphins
1986	Vai Sikahema	522	Los Angeles Rams
1987	Vai Sikahema (2)	550	Los Angeles Rams
1988	John Taylor	556	San Francisco 49ers
1989	Dave Meggett	582	New York Giants
1990	Dave Meggett (2)	467	New York Giants
1991	Brian Mitchell	600	Washington Redskins
1992	Kelvin Martin	532	Dallas Cowboys
1993	Tyrone Hughes	503	New Orleans Saints
1994	Tim Brown	487	Los Angeles Raiders
1995	Tamarick Vanover	540	Kansas City Chiefs
1996	Desmond Howard	875*	Green Bay Packers
1997	Leon Johnson	619	New York Jets
1998	Reggie Barlow	555	Jacksonville Jaguars
1999	Tamarick Vanover (2)	627	Kansas City Chiefs
2000	Derrick Mason	662	Tennessee Titans
2001	Jermaine Lewis	519	Baltimore Ravens
2002	Michael Lewis	625	New Orleans Saints
2003	Allen Rossum	545	Atlanta Falcons
2004	B.J. Sams	575	Baltimore Ravens
2005	Mark Jones	492	Tampa Bay Buccaneers
2006	Devin Hester	600	Chicago Bears
2007	Nate Burleson	658	Seattle Seahawks
2008	Johnnie Lee Higgins	570	Oakland Raiders
2009	Quan Cosby	474	Cincinnati Bengals
2010	Devin Hester (2)	564	Chicago Bears
2011	Patrick Peterson	699	Arizona Cardinals
2012	Trindon Holliday	481	Houston Texans; Denver Broncos
2013	Dexter McCluster	686	Kansas City Chiefs
2014	Darren Sproles	506	Philadelphia Eagles
2015	Darren Sproles (2)	446	Philadelphia Eagles
2016	Tyreek Hill	592	Kansas City Chiefs
2017	Jamal Agnew	447	Detroit Lions
2018	Tarik Cohen	411	Chicago Bears
2019	Deonte Harris	338	New Orleans Saints
2020	Gunner Olszewski^	346	New England Patriots
2021	Ray-Ray McCloud	367	Pittsburgh Steelers
2022	Marcus Jones^	362	New England Patriots
2023	Britain Covey^	417	Philadelphia Eagles
2024	Kalif Raymond^	413	Detroit Lions
2025	Marvin Mims^	452	Denver Broncos

== All-America Football Conference (AAFC) ==
Key
Symbol	Meaning
Player	The player who recorded the most punt return yards in the AAFC
Yds	The total number of punt return yards the player had
*	Player set the single-season punt return yards record

AAFC annual punt return yards leaders by season
Season	Player	Yds	Team	Ref.
1946	Chuck Fenenbock	299*	Los Angeles Dons	
1947	Glenn Dobbs	215	Brooklyn Dodgers; Los Angeles Dons	
1948	Herman Wedemeyer	368*	Los Angeles Dons	
1949	Jim Cason	351	San Francisco 49ers	

== American Football League (AFL) ==
Key
Symbol	Meaning
Leader	The player who recorded the most punt return yards in the AFL
Yards	The total number of punt return yards the player had
*	Player set the single-season punt return yards record
(#)	Denotes the number of times a player appears in this list

Season	Player	Yards	Team	Ref.
1960	Abner Haynes	215*	Dallas Texans	
1961	Dick Christy	383*	New York Titans	
1962	Dick Christy (2)	250	New York Titans	
1963	Claude Gibson	307	Oakland Raiders	
1964	Claude Gibson (2)	419*	Oakland Raiders	
1965	Speedy Duncan	464*	San Diego Chargers	
1966	Rodger Bird	323	Oakland Raiders	
1967	Rodger Bird (2)	612*	Oakland Raiders	
1968	George Atkinson	490	Oakland Raiders	
1969	Jerry LeVias	292	Houston Oilers	

== Most seasons leading the league ==
Count	Player	Seasons	Team(s)
3	Alvin Haymond	1965, 1966, 1969	Baltimore Colts (2) / Los Angeles Rams (1)
2	Claude Gibson	1963, 1964	Oakland Raiders
2	Dick Christy	1961, 1962	New York Titans
2	Rodger Bird	1966, 1967	Oakland Raiders
2	Bill Dudley	1942, 1946	Pittsburgh Steelers
2	Darren Sproles	2014, 2015	Philadelphia Eagles
2	Dave Meggett	1989, 1990	New York Giants
2	Devin Hester	2006, 2010	Chicago Bears
2	Emlen Tunnell	1951, 1952	New York Giants
2	J.T. Smith	1979, 1980	Kansas City Chiefs
2	Tamarick Vanover	1995, 1999	Kansas City Chiefs
2	Vai Sikahema	1986, 1987	Los Angeles Rams

== See also ==
- List of NFL career punts leaders
- List of NFL annual punting yards leaders
