= NFL kickoff return yards leaders =

NFL kickoff return yards leaders may refer to:

- List of NFL annual kickoff return yards leaders
- List of NFL career kickoff return yards leaders
