= Bobby Jancik =

American football player (1940–2005)

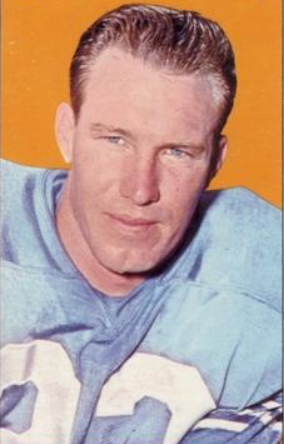
- Jancik in 1965

No. 23
- Positions: Cornerback, return specialist

Personal information
- Born: February 9, 1940; Houston, Texas, U.S.
- Died: December 24, 2005 (aged 65); Bryan, Texas, U.S.
- Listed height: 5 ft 11 in (1.80 m)
- Listed weight: 178 lb (81 kg)

Career information
- College: Lamar
- AFL draft: 1962: 19th round, 151st overall pick

Career history
- Houston Oilers (1962–1967)

Awards and highlights
- First-team Little All-American (1961); 2× AFL kickoff return yards leader (1963, 1966)

Career statistics
- Interceptions: 15
- Fumble recoveries: 2
- Stats at Pro Football Reference

Robert Lee Jancik Jr. (February 9, 1940 – December 24, 2005), also known as Bobby Jancik, was an American college and professional football player, who played for the American Football League's Houston Oilers from 1962 through 1967. He led the AFL in kickoff return average in his first two seasons.

== Early life ==
Jancik was born on February 9, 1940, in Houston. He attended Lamar Consolidated High School, serving Richmond and Rosenberg, Texas. He was a running back on the school's football team. In 1956, as a 141 lb. (64 kg) junior, he was unanimously selected at running back to the first-team Texas 12-AAA All-District Team. As a senior in 1957, the now 155 lb. (70.3 kg) Jancik was selected again as first-team All-District 12-AAA at running back.

== College career ==
After high school, the recently married Jancik accepted a football scholarship to Wharton Junior College, where he was a running back on the football team. He later transferred to Lamar Tech College, where he played halfback, defensive back, receiver, punt returner and kickoff returner on the Lamar Cardinals football team. In 1961, he was selected as an Associated Press (AP) Little All-American in football. He was selected first-team All-Lone Star Conference at halfback by the conference's coaches. He suffered a dislocated knee injury in mid-December 1961 that ultimately required surgery, preventing him from playing a role in Lamar Tech's December 30, 1961 victory over Middle Tennessee in the 1961 Tangerine Bowl.

Jancik also was a member of the Cardinals' track team. In track, he competed in the high jump, broad jump and javelin throw. In May 1962, he won the Lone Star Conference javelin competition.

Jancik graduated in 1962 with a degree in commercial art.

== Professional career ==
The Houston Oilers selected Jancik in the 19th round of the 1962 AFL draft, 151st overall. The 178 lb. (80.7 kg) Jancik entered the Oilers 1962 training camp as a defensive back. Jancik played for the Oilers from 1962 to 1967. He played in 81 games, starting 39; and had 15 interceptions over his career, playing all four positions in the Oilers' defensive backfield.

Jancik was a punt and kickoff returner over his entire Oilers career. As a rookie in 1962, he returned 24 kickoffs for 726 yards. His 30.3 yards per return average was first in the AFL. He also returned 14 punts for 116 yards (8.3 yards per return) as a rookie. The Oakland Raiders' Bob Garner led the AFL in punt return average at 8.1 yards per return. He started two games at defensive back that season, with two interceptions. He was an honorable mention for United Press International's (UPI) All-AFL Team in 1962, at defensive back.

In 1963, he played a more prominent role as a defensive back, starting a career-high 11 games at cornerback, with three interceptions; while continuing in his role as a return specialist. He led the AFL in kickoff returns (45), kickoff return yardage (1,317 yards) and yards per kickoff return (29.3). He also returned 13 punts for 145 yards, averaging 11.2 yards per punt return. He had a particularly dynamic 56-yard punt return against the Boston Patriots, evading the coverage team with great agility, described at the time as "a cross between an Irish jig and the twist". He was an honorable mention for UPI's All-AFL Team in 1963, at safety.

In 1964, Jancik had his only career return for a touchdown. On December 20, 1964, he had an 82-yard punt return for a touchdown against the Denver Broncos. This was the longest punt return for the 1964 AFL season. Overall, Jancik returned 12 punts for 220 yards, averaging 18.3 yards per return; during a season in which the league average was 9.6 yards per punt return. He also started eight games at cornerback, with three interceptions.

In 1965, Jancik had a career high with four interceptions, though he only started four games at safety for injured free safety Fred Glick. His 18 kickoff returns were the fewest of Jancik's career to date, and 7.1 yards per punt return was his lowest career average to date. In 1966, Jancik again led the AFL in kickoff returns (35) and kickoff return yardage (875). He went into the 1966 Oilers training camp considered a reserve, but was named as starter at right cornerback going into the season. He started eight games in the defensive backfield that season, with two interceptions. He also played free safety that season, for the injured Glick, as well as strong (tight) safety. Jancik himself suffered a shoulder injury during the 1966 season that required surgery.

Jancik started the 1967 season as the Oilers starting strong safety, but lost his starting job to rookie, and future Pro Football Hall of Fame safety, Ken Houston. Houston continued as the Oilers starting safety for the ensuing 12 years, being selected to the Pro Bowl in every one of those years. Late in his career, Houston said "'I knew from the day I replaced Bobby Jancik at Houston, that one day someone would replace me. That's just the way it is'". Jancik was placed on injured waivers in November 1967, due to a pulled hamstring muscle.

In January 1968, Jancik announced his retirement from football, and his intention to join the Houston police academy.

== Personal life ==
While recovering from his 1966 shoulder surgery, Jancik worked as a dispatcher for the Fort Bend County Sheriff's Department, which began his interest in police work. After retirement, Jancik served as a uniformed police officer in Houston for 12 years, before becoming a detective.

== Death ==
On Christmas Eve 2005, Jancik died at St. Joseph's Hospital in Bryan, Texas, after suffering a massive heart attack at age 65, in his Brenham, Texas home

== See also ==
- Other American Football League players
