= Ron Smith (defensive back) =

American football player (1943–2013)

No. 84, 40, 41, 48, 27
- Positions: Cornerback, wide receiver, return specialist

Personal information
- Born: May 3, 1943; Chicago, Illinois, U.S.
- Died: June 2, 2013 (aged 70); Denver, Colorado, U.S.
- Listed height: 6 ft 1 in (1.85 m)
- Listed weight: 195 lb (88 kg)

Career information
- High school: Washington (East Chicago, Indiana)
- College: Wisconsin
- NFL draft: 1965: undrafted

Career history
- Chicago Bears (1965); Atlanta Falcons (1966–1967); Los Angeles Rams (1968–1969); Chicago Bears (1970–1972); San Diego Chargers (1973); Oakland Raiders (1974)

Awards and highlights
- Pro Bowl (1972); 2× NFL kickoff return yards leader (1966, 1967); Second-team All-Big Ten (1964)

Career NFL statistics
- Interceptions: 13
- Fumble recoveries: 24
- Kick/punt return yards: 8,710
- Total touchdowns: 6
- Stats at Pro Football Reference

Ronald "Trousers" Smith (May 3, 1943 – June 2, 2013) was an American professional football cornerback and return specialist. He played in the National Football League (NFL) for ten seasons with five teams: the Chicago Bears (1965, 1970–1972), Atlanta Falcons (1966–1967), Los Angeles Rams (1968–1969), San Diego Chargers (1973), and Oakland Raiders (1974). He was traded along with Jim Seymour from the Rams to the Bears for Dick Evey on September 1, 1970. He went to the Pro Bowl after the 1972 season as a kick returner.

Smith is in the top-20 players in NFL history in career total combined punt and kick return yards, and in career total kick return yards.

== Early life ==
Smith was born on May 3, 1943, in Chicago. He attended East Chicago, Indiana's Washington High School. He was a halfback on the school's football team, a forward on its state championship basketball team, and a record setting quarter-miler on the track team.

== College career ==
Smith was persuaded to attend the University of Wisconsin by former Wisconsin Badgers running back and then NFL player Dan Lewis (who would be Smith's NFL teammate in Atlanta during training camp in 1966). Smith played halfback and flanker on the Wisconsin Badgers football team, under coach Milt Bruhn, from 1962 to 1964. In college, he was timed running the 100-yard dash in 9.7 seconds.

Wisconsin finished the 1962 season 8–2, ranked second nationally by the Associated Press (AP). The Badgers lost to the No. 1 ranked University of Southern California in the January 1, 1963 Rose Bowl, 42–37. In the Rose Bowl, Smith had two rushing attempts for five yards and two receptions for 14 yards.

As a sophomore running back in 1962, Smith had 177 yards in 50 rushing attempts, with five rushing touchdowns. He also had nine receptions for 144 yards and two receiving touchdowns. One of his two best games at Wisconsin came in 1962 against Iowa, where he scored three touchdowns in the game, one receiving and two rushing. The Badgers fell to 5–4 in 1963. Smith had only 33 rushing yards in 12 attempts, but had 12 receptions for 141 yards and a touchdown.

As a senior in 1964, the Badgers fell to 3–6. Smith had 438 yards in 101 rushing attempts and one touchdown on the season. He also had 13 receptions for 114 yards. In a November 1964 game against Minnesota, played in temperatures as low as 9 degrees Fahrenheit (-12.8 C), Smith had his best rushing game as a Badger. He ran for 160 yards on 22 carries, and had the game-winning 48-yard touchdown run. He also had one reception for 16 yards.

== Professional career ==
=== Chicago Bears ===
Smith was not drafted after graduating from Wisconsin. He asked the Chicago Bears owner and Hall of Fame coach George Halas for a tryout, which Halas agreed to on a conditional basis in 1965. He was signed by the Bears defensive coach George Allen, a future Hall of Fame head coach. Allen gave Smith guidance on how Smith could improve as a player through detailed observation and notation of the things he did right and things he did incorrectly. Halas used Smith as a punt and kick returner in preseason, and then sparingly during the season, but had no openings for Smith on offense, where future Hall of Famer Gale Sayers was in his rookie season at halfback. Halas offered to use Smith if he would play cornerback, and Smith agreed, again playing defense only sparingly for the Bears in 1965.

=== Atlanta Falcons ===
Smith was left unprotected in the February 1966 expansion draft that provided players to the newly formed Atlanta Falcons team for its inaugural season. The Falcons selected Smith (as well as Dan Lewis). During the 1966 preseason Smith proved himself to be one of the Falcons best defensive players, at cornerback. He started all 14 games for the Falcons in 1966 at left cornerback, with two interceptions. Smith led the NFL in both kickoff returns (43) and kickoff return yardage (1,013), including an 80-yard return. He also returned 11 punts for 80 yards.

The 43 returns in a season were a then NFL record. Smith was not happy to hold that record as it meant both that he was playing on a bad team and his risk of injury increased. The 1966 Falcons' defense gave up the second most points in the NFL during that 14-game season (437), and gave up the most total yards (5, 272).

In 1967, Smith led the NFL again in total kickoff returns (39) and total kickoff return yardage (976), though he suffered a leg injury that limited his playing time. He also returned 20 punts for 92 yards. The Falcons moved him to offense, where he started seven games as a receiver. The Falcons believed this move would help quarterback Randy Johnson by giving him a faster receiver. In the first game of the 1967 season against the Baltimore Colts, Smith returned a kickoff 99 yards for a touchdown. He also had one pass reception in that game for 60 yards. On the season, Smith had 11 receptions (seventh best on the Falcons) for 227 yards (fourth best on the Falcons). He also had 42 rushing yards in eight carries.

During the Falcons first two seasons, the team was 3–11 and then 1–12–1.

=== Los Angeles Rams ===
In 1968, the Falcons traded Smith to the Los Angeles Rams for a high draft choice, which the Rams had obtained when they traded Ben Wilson to the Green Bay Packers. George Allen, who had been Smith's defensive coach with the Bears, was the Rams head coach. Smith was grateful and very pleased to be on a winning and close-knit team. During preseason he was used as a return specialist and defensive back, and impressed coach Allen sufficiently as a return specialist that Allen waived Joe Williams, whom the Rams had drafted in the eighth round of the 1968 NFL/AFL draft as a return specialist.

Smith started 14 games at strong safety for the Rams in 1968, with three interceptions. He returned 27 punts for 171 yards, and 26 kickoffs for 718 yards. His 27.6 yards per return average on kickoffs led the NFL. In the first game of the 1968 season, on a Monday night, Smith returned a kickoff 94 yards for a touchdown against the St. Louis Cardinals. The Rams finished the season, 10–3–1.

In 1969, Allen traded Billy Guy Anderson, Jimmy Raye and a future draft pick to the Philadelphia Eagles for Alvin Haymond. At the time, Allen called Haymond the league's best return man. In 1969, Haymond led the NFL in punt return yards and average yards per punt return. He returned 16 kickoffs for 375 yards. Smith returned 23 punts for 122 yards (5.3 yards per return), and 27 kickoffs for 585 yards. Allen moved Smith to cornerback and he started 12 games in 1969, with three interceptions, including one for a 24-yard touchdown return against the Falcons in an early November game.

=== Return to Bears ===
In early September 1970, Allen traded Smith and receiver Jim Seymour (a former Rams No. 1 draft pick) to the Chicago Bears for defensive end Dick Evey (a former Bears No. 1 draft pick) and a draft choice. Allen had been the Bears director of player personnel involved in drafting Evey. At the time, Allen said "'Smith did an excellent job for us as a kick returner and also played two positions. We'll miss him'".

Smith started four games for the Bears in 1970, but his primary role was as a return specialist. He returned 33 punts for 126 yards, and 28 kickoffs for 651 yards. He returned kicks alongside Cecil Turner, who had one of the best all-time seasons for a kick returner in NFL history. Turner tied the all-time record for touchdowns on kickoff returns in a seasons (4), and was second in the league that year with a 32.7 yards per return average. The Bears were 6–8 on the season. In 1971, Smith started 14 games at strong safety, with three interceptions. He returned 26 punts for 194 yards, and 26 kickoffs for 671 yards. The Bears were again 6–8.

Smith had his best NFL season in 1972, when he was named to the Pro Bowl for the first and only time. He again started 14 games at strong safety, and had one interception; but it was as a kickoff returner that he excelled in 1972. He led the NFL with a 30.8 yards per kick return average (924 yards on 30 returns). He also returned 26 punts for 163 yards. In the final game of the 1972 NFL regular season against the Oakland Raiders, Smith returned the opening kickoff 94 yards for a touchdown. The Bears' record on the season was 4–9–1.

His nickname on the Bears was “the Gingerbread Man”.

=== San Diego Chargers and Oakland Raiders ===
In May 1973, the Bears traded Smith to the San Diego Chargers for a draft pick. Smith started nine games for the Chargers that season at strong safety, with one interception. He had his best season as a punt returner. He returned 27 punts for 352 yards, and his 13 yards per punt return average led the NFL. He returned two punts for touchdowns, also leading the NFL. In the second game of the season, against the Buffalo Bills, Smith returned a punt 72 yards for a touchdown in the first quarter. In the Chargers second game against the Bills that season, on November 18, 1973, Smith had an 84-yard punt return for a touchdown, the longest punt return of the 1973 NFL season. He also returned 36 kickoffs for 947 yards, and his 26.3 average yards per return was sixth best in the NFL.

In 1974, the Chargers traded Smith to the Oakland Raiders for draft picks. This was the best team for which Smith played during his career, going 12–2 and reaching the 1974 AFC Championship Game where they lost to the eventual Super Bowl IX Champion Pittsburgh Steelers, 24–13. During the season, Smith had a career-high 41 punt returns. He averaged 11.9 yards per punt return (second highest of his career). Smith had 19 kickoff returns, his fewest since his 1965 rookie season, for 420 yards (22.1 yards per return). In the divisional round playoff win against the Miami Dolphins, he had two kickoff returns for 47 yards and three punt returns for 16 yards. In the AFC Championship Game, he had two kick returns for 42 yards.

1974 was Smith's final season in the NFL. In 1975, he tried out for the Southern California Sun of the World Football League, but was waived in September 1975.

== Legacy ==
Over his ten-year NFL career, Smith returned 275 kickoffs for 6,922 yards (25.2 yards per return) and three touchdowns. He returned 235 punts for 1,788 yards (7.6 yards per return) and two touchdowns. He also had 13 career interceptions, with one touchdown return.

His 8,710 career punt and kickoff combined total return yards ranks 16th in NFL history (through the 2024 season). His 1,788 punt return yards rank 53rd all-time, and 6,922 kick return yards ranks 15th all-time (through the 2024 season).

== Death ==
On June 2, 2013, Smith died in Denver, Colorado from lung cancer.
