= Al Harris (cornerback) =

American football player and coach (born 1974)

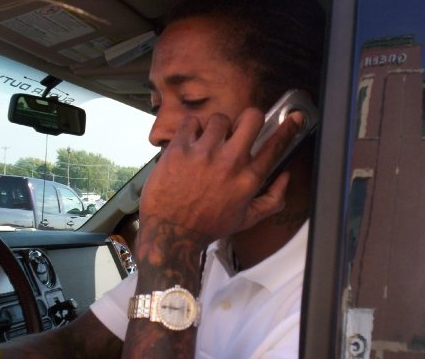
- Harris in 2007

Chicago Bears
- Title: Defensive backs coach Defensive pass game coordinator

Personal information
- Born: December 7, 1974 (age 51); Coconut Creek, Florida, U.S.
- Listed height: 6 ft 1 in (1.85 m)
- Listed weight: 194 lb (88 kg)

Career information
- Position: Cornerback (No. 31)
- High school: Blanche Ely (Pompano Beach, Florida)
- College: Trinity Valley CC (1993–1994); Texas A&M–Kingsville (1995–1996)
- NFL draft: 1997: 6th round, 169th overall pick

Career history

Playing
- Tampa Bay Buccaneers (1997)*; Philadelphia Eagles (1998–2002); Green Bay Packers (2003–2010); Miami Dolphins (2010); St. Louis Rams (2011)
- * Offseason or practice squad member only

Coaching
- Miami Dolphins (2012) Coaching intern; Kansas City Chiefs (2013–2018); Assistant secondary/defensive assistant (2013); Assistant secondary coach (2014–2015); Secondary/cornerbacks coach (2016–2018); FAU (2019) Defensive assistant; Dallas Cowboys (2020–2024); Defensive backs coach (2020–2023); Assistant head coach & defensive backs coach (2024); Chicago Bears (2025–present) Defensive backs coach & defensive pass game coordinator

Awards and highlights
- Super Bowl champion (XLV); Second-team All-Pro (2007); 2× Pro Bowl (2007, 2008); Green Bay Packers Hall of Fame

Career NFL statistics
- Tackles: 470
- Sacks: 4.0
- Forced fumbles: 2
- Fumble recoveries: 2
- Interceptions: 21
- Defensive touchdowns: 3
- Stats at Pro Football Reference

Alshinard Harris (born December 7, 1974) is an American professional football coach and former player who is the defensive pass game coordinator and defensive backs coach for the Chicago Bears of the National Football League (NFL). Harris played as a cornerback for 14 seasons in the NFL from 1998 to 2011. He played for the Tampa Bay Buccaneers, Philadelphia Eagles, Green Bay Packers, Miami Dolphins, and St. Louis Rams. He was selected for the Pro Bowl after his 2007 and 2008 seasons in Green Bay. The AP also named him a second team All-Pro in 2007.

Harris was known throughout the league for his physical, bump and run coverage style and was also known for his long, stringy dreadlocks, influencing others in the NFL. He was drafted by the Tampa Bay Buccaneers in the sixth round of the 1997 NFL draft. He played college football for the Texas A&M–Kingsville Javelinas.

== College career ==
Harris spent two seasons (1993–94) at Trinity Valley Community College in Athens, Texas, where he was a member of the 1994 national championship team. He then transferred to Texas A&M University–Kingsville where he was a two-year starter and letterman (1995–96). Harris was a first-team All-Lone Star Conference pick in 1996.

== Professional career ==
=== Tampa Bay Buccaneers ===
The Tampa Bay Buccaneers picked Harris in the sixth round (169th overall) of the 1997 NFL draft. He was the 26th cornerback picked and was one of two cornerbacks selected by the Buccaneers in 1997, following third Round pick (97th overall) Ronde Barber. He was the 40th player selected from Texas A&M–Kingsville since 1967.

On July 1, 1997, the Tampa Bay Buccaneers signed Harris to a rookie contract. He entered training camp as a backup and competed for a roster spot against Tyrone Legette, Ronde Barber, and undrafted rookie Floyd Young. On August 24, 1997, the Buccaneers released Harris and placed him on waivers. On August 26, 1997, the Buccaneers assigned him to their practice squad after he cleared waivers. He remained on the practice squad throughout the entire 1997 NFL season.

He returned to training camp as a backup cornerback and was on the bubble, competing for the last roster spot as a cornerback against Ronde Barber and Floyd Young. The Buccaneers had retained starting cornerbacks Donnie Abraham and Anthony Parker and also selected Brian Kelly in the second round of the 1998 NFL draft. On August 30, 1998, the Tampa Bay Buccaneers released Harris as part of their final roster cuts.

=== Philadelphia Eagles ===
==== 1998 ====
On August 31, 1998, the Philadelphia Eagles claimed Harris and acquired him after he cleared waivers. Head coach Ray Rhodes immediately named Harris the No. 2 starting cornerback for the upcoming season-opener in six days after Bobby Taylor was placed on injured reserve after fracturing his scapula during their third preseason game against the Baltimore Ravens. During the first quarter, Taylor made an interception and landed awkwardly on his shoulder as he fell to the turf and was expected to remain inactive for six–eight weeks. The Eagles only two backup cornerbacks were rookies Clarence Love and Allen Rossum. He would begin the season starting alongside Troy Vincent.

On September 6, 1998, Harris made his professional regular season debut and earned his first career start in the Philadelphia Eagles' home opener against the Seattle Seahawks and recorded four solo tackles as they lost 36–0. In Week 3, he set a season-high with six solo tackles and two pass deflections during a 3–17 loss at the Arizona Cardinals. He remained the No. 2 starting cornerback for the first five games before Bobby Taylor reclaimed his role after he had recovered from his injury. On December 28, 1998, the Philadelphia Eagles officially fired head coach Ray Rhodes after they finished the 1998 NFL season with a disappointing 3–13 record. He finished the season with 41 combined tackles (40 solo) and seven pass deflections in 16 games and seven starts.

==== 1999 ====
On January 11, 1999, the Philadelphia Eagles hired Green Bay Packers quarterbacks coach Andy Reid as their new head coach. The Packers coincidentally hired Ray Rhodes to be their new head coach on the same day. Throughout training camp, he competed against Bobby Taylor for the role as the No. 2 starting cornerback under new defensive coordinator Jim Johnson. He was named the starting nickelback and was listed as the No. 3 cornerback on the depth chart to begin the season, behind Troy Vincent and Bobby Taylor.

On September 12, 1999, Harris started in the Eagles' home opener against the Arizona Cardinals and made five solo tackles, two pass deflections, and had his first career interception off a pass by Jake Plummer to wide receiver Frank Sanders during a 25–24 loss. In Week 5, he recorded one solo tackle and set a season-high with four pass deflections as the Eagles defeated the Dallas Cowboy 10–13.

On November 6, 1999, the Philadelphia Eagles signed Harris to a five—year contract extension. With one—year remaining on his previous contract, Harris was signed for the six—years throughout the 2004 NFL season. In Week 10, Harris made two solo tackles, two pass deflections, and helped lead a fourth quarter comeback 28–35 victory against the Washington Redskins by intercepting a pass by Brad Johnson to wide receiver Albert Connell with less than five minutes left losing 28–27. Running back Eric Bieniemy would run for an 11–yard touchdown on the next drive to gain the lead 28–35 with 3:17 remaining. In Week 15, Harris made four combined tackles (two solo), had two pass breakups, and intercepted a pass thrown by Drew Bledsoe as the Eagles defeated the New England Patriots 9–24. On January 2, 2000, Harris made one solo tackle, a pass deflection, and secured a 31–38 victory against the St. Louis Rams by intercepting a pass by Joe Germaine to running back Robert Holcombe and returning it 17–yards to score the first touchdown of his career with 1:20 remaining to increase their lead by 14 points to lead the Rams 24–38. This marked Harris's first career touchdown and his first pick-six, while also setting his career-high with four interceptions in a single season. He finished the 1999 NFL season with 38 combined tackles (33 solo), 15 pass deflections, four interceptions, and one touchdown in 16 games and six starts. He lined up as the nickelback throughout the season and had three starts at nickelback, with the other three as an injury replacement at outside cornerback.

==== 2000 ====
The Philadelphia Eagles entered the 2000 NFL season in their second season under head coach Andy Reid and second-year quarterback Donovan McNabb. Defensive coordinator Jim Johnson retained Troy Vincent, Bobby Taylor, and Al Harris at cornerback and Brian Dawkins at free safety, with Damon Moore replacing Tim Hauck at strong safety. In Week 15, Harris set a season-high with four solo tackles during a 35–24 victory at the Cleveland Browns. He finished the season with only 27 combined tackles (25 solo) and three pass deflections in 16 games and four starts. He was starting at nickelback throughout the entire season with Bobby Taylor and Troy Vincent starting all 16 games at outside corner.

The Philadelphia Eagles went from a 5–11 record in 1999 to an 11–5 record in 2000, finishing in second in the NFC East. On December 31, 2000, Harris appeared in the first playoff game of his career and recorded two solo tackles and had one pass break-up as the Eagles routed the Tampa Bay Buccaneers at Veterans Stadium 3–21 in the NFC Wild-Card Game. They were eliminated from the playoffs the following week after losing 10–20 at the New York Giants in the Divisional Round.

==== 2001 ====
He returned as the primary nickelback in 2001 and remained as the third cornerback on the depth chart behind Troy Vincent and Bobby Taylor. On September 30, 2001, Harris recorded two solo tackles, three pass deflections, and intercepted a pass by Anthony Wright to wide receiver Joey Galloway as the Eagles routed the Dallas Cowboys 18–40. In Week 12, he made two solo tackles, had one pass breakup, and secured a 23–10 victory at the Kansas City Chiefs by intercepting a pass by Trent Green to wide receiver Larry Parker with 3:09 remaining. He finished the season with 22 combined tackles (20 solo), 12 pass deflections, and made two interceptions in 16 games and two starts.

==== 2002 ====
The Philadelphia Eagles selected two cornerbacks in the 2002 NFL draft, including first round pick (26th overall) Lito Sheppard and second round pick (59th overall) Sheldon Brown. Head coach Andy Reid retained Harris as the starting nickelback and third cornerback on the depth chart to begin the season, behind returning starters Troy Vincent and Bobby Taylor.

On September 8, 2002, Harris started in the Eagles' season opener at the Tennessee Titans in place of Troy Vincent, after he injured his knee during practice. Harris set a season-high with six solo tackles as they lost 24–27. On October 20, 2002, Harris set a season-high with three pass deflections and had his only interception of the season on a pass by Brad Johnson to wide receiver Keyshawn Johnson as the Eagles defeated the Tampa Bay Buccaneers 10—20. He finished the 2002 NFL season with 27 combined tackles (22 solo), 17 pass deflections, and one interception in 16 games and two starts. He completed his fifth season without having missed a single regular season game yet and extended his streak of regular season games to 80 games in-a-row.

=== Green Bay Packers ===
==== 2003 ====
On February 27, 2003, the Philadelphia Eagles traded Harris and a fourth round pick (120th overall) in the 2003 NFL draft to the Green Bay Packers in return for their 2003 second round selection (62nd overall). General Manager/Head Coach Mike Sherman had been an assistant coach alongside Eagles' Vice President of Football Operations/Head Coach Andy Reid from 1997–1998 under Mike Holmgren for the Green Bay Packers. Entering training camp, it was expected that Harris would takeover as a starting cornerback following the departure of Tyrone Williams. Defensive coordinator Ed Donatell began the season with Harris and Mike McKenzie.

"He can come in and help us pretty quickly. I needed to fix the team right away with a player. He is very aggressive. He has good size and he challenges receivers."

— Mike Sherman (Packers' GM/Head coach)

On September 14, 2003, Harris made two solo tackles, one pass deflection, and had a pick-six by intercepting a pass by Joey Harrington to wide receiver Casey Fitzsimmons during a 6–31 victory against the Detroit Lions. In Week 5, he set a season-high with seven combined tackles (six solo) and had two pass break-ups as the Packers defeated the Seattle Seahawks 35–13. In Week 17, Harris made two solo tackles, two pass deflections, and intercepted a pass by Jarious Jackson to wide receiver Nate Jackson as the Packers routed the Denver Broncos 31–3. He started all 16 games for the first time in his career and made 48 combined tackles (46 solo), 14 pass deflections, and three interceptions.

The Green Bay Packers finished first in the NFC North with a 10–6 record in 2003. On January 4, 2004, Harris started in the 2003 NFC wildcard playoff game and made five solo tackles and one pass deflection in regulation as the Packers tied the Seattle Seahawks 27–27 to send the game into overtime. To start overtime, the Seahawks won a coin toss and received the ability to decide possession. Seahawks' quarterback Matt Hasselbeck said into the microphone to the crowd at Lambeau Field and to the national television audience, "We want the ball and we're going to score!" Both teams failed to score on their opening drives. On the Seahawks' second offensive drive, Harris would intercept a pass by Matt Hasselbeck to wide receiver Alex Bannister and returned it 52–yards for the game-winning touchdown to send the Packers into the Divisional Round. It was the first time a playoff game would have a defensive touchdown end overtime. On January 11, 2004, Harris would start in the NFC Divisional Round against his former team, the Philadelphia Eagles. At Veterans Stadium, he recorded four combined tackles (three solo) and had a pass deflection as the Packers lost 17–20 in their second consecutive overtime game. On the Packers' first offensive play in overtime, Brett Favre would throw a pass to wide receiver Javon Walker that was picked off by Brian Dawkins and returned 35–yards. This would lead to the game-winning field goal.

==== 2004 ====
Defensive coordinator Ed Donatell was fired following the playoff loss to the Eagles. Head coach Mike Sherman promoted defensive backs coach Bob Slowik to defensive coordinator. The Packers used their first-round selection (25th overall) in the 2004 NFL draft on cornerback Ahmad Carroll and used their third-round selection (70th overall) on cornerback Joey Thomas. It was speculated that the Packers' decision to use their top two picks on cornerbacks was related to an ongoing contract dispute with No. 2 starting cornerback Mike McKenzie. McKenzie requested a trade or a contract extension and if neither of those demands were met, he'd continue to holdout and would even retire. Harris entered training camp slated as the de facto No. 1 starting cornerback due to Mike McKenzie's training camp holdout. Head coach Mike Sherman named Harris and veteran Michael Hawthorne as the starting cornerbacks to begin the season.

On September 12, 2004, the Green Bay Packers signed Harris to a five—year, $18.70 million contract extension that included $7 million guaranteed. On October 4, 2004, the Packers officially traded Mike McKenzie to the New Orleans Saints. On October 15, 2004, it was reported that Michael Hawthorne would be demoted and replaced by rookie Ahmad Carroll beginning in Week 6. In Week 8, Harris recorded three solo tackles, set a season-high with three pass deflections, and led the Packers to a victory at the Washington Redskins by intercepting a pass attempt thrown by Mark Brunell to wide receiver Rod Gardner as the Packers led 20–14 with 2:35 remaining in the fourth quarter. Harris returned his interception for 29–yards to the Washington 36–yard line and the Packers would cap off the drive with an 11–yard touchdown run by Ahman Green and successfully executed a two-point conversion for a 28–21 victory. In Week 12, Harris set a new season-high with eight combined tackles (seven solo) as the Packers defeated the St. Louis Rams 45–17. He started all 16 games for the second consecutive season and set a career-high with 62 combined tackles (56 solo), set a career-high with 20 pass deflections, and had one interception.

The Green Bay Packers finished the 2004 NFL season a top the NFC North with a 10–6 record. On January 9, 2005, Harris started in the NFC Wild Card Game and recorded six combined tackles (five solo) to lose 31–17 to the Minnesota Vikings. Harris was mainly responsible for covering star wide receiver Randy Moss. Late in the fourth quarter, Moss caught a 34–yard touchdown reception from Daunte Culpepper with Harris in coverage. Moss immediately ran next to the goal post, bent over, and pretended to "moon" the crowd at Lambeau Field. He states his motivation for his celebration was as a response to Packers fans throwing eggs at buses and actually dropping their pants and mooning buses of the visiting team as they arrive. The NFL would fine Moss $10,000 for the incident.

==== 2005 ====
On January 23, 2005, the Green Bay Packers announced Mike Sherman's decision to hire Jim Bates to be their defensive coordinator following the departure of Bob Slowik. This marked their third defensive coordinator in as many seasons. He returned as the No. 1 starting cornerback to begin the season and was paired with Ahmad Carroll. On October 9, 2005, Harris made one solo tackle, set a season-high with three pass deflections, made one sack, and set a season-high with two interceptions off passes by Aaron Brooks, returning one for a 22–yard touchdown as the Packers routed the New Orleans Saints 3–52. He had his first career sack on Aaron Brooks for a four–yard loss in the third quarter. In Week 16, he had eight combined tackles (five solo) during a 17–24 loss against the Chicago Bears. The following week, he made two solo tackles, one pass deflection, and intercepted a pass by Seneca Wallace to wide receiver Peter Warrick during a 23–17 win against the Seattle Seahawks. He stated all 16 games for the third consecutive season and made 53 combined tackles (46 solo), 13 pass deflections, set a career-high with three sacks, made three interceptions, and returned one for a touchdown. He allowed only one touchdown in coverage.

==== 2006 ====
On January 2, 2006, the Green Bay Packers fired head coach Mike Sherman following a 4–12 record in 2005. They hired San Francisco 49ers' offensive coordinator Mike McCarthy as their new head coach. Entering training camp, Harris was slated as the No. 2 starting cornerback after the Packers signed Charles Woodson. Defensive coordinator Bob Sanders named Harris and Charles Woodson the starting cornerbacks to begin the season.

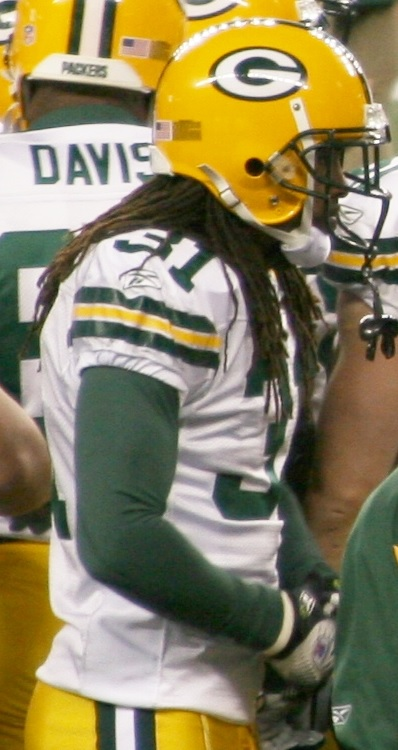
Al Harris in 2006

In Week 8, Harris recorded four solo tackles with four pass deflections as the Packers defeated the Arizona Cardinals 31–14. In Week 12, he tied his season-high of four solo tackles, made two pass deflections, and intercepted a pass by Matt Hasselbeck to wide receiver Deion Branch during a 24–34 loss at the Seattle Seahawks. In Week 15, Harris made two solo tackles, one pass deflection, and returned an interception thrown on a pass attempt by Jon Kitna to wide receiver Roy Williams for 34 yards during a 17–9 win against the Detroit Lions. He started all 16 games for the fourth consecutive season and made 41 combined tackles (35 solo), 13 pass deflections, three interceptions, and had one touchdown.

==== 2007 ====
On February 13, 2007, it was announced that Harris signed a two-year contract extension with the Packers. The deal was an add-on to the five-year, $18.7 million extension that Harris signed in 2004, a contract that included about $7 million in guarantees. That extension still had three seasons remaining on it, through 2009. Financial details of the new extension were not yet available, but Harris told the Wisconsin State Journal that it included two roster bonuses totaling $4.5 million, along with some Pro Bowl incentives.

Harris played in the 2008 Pro Bowl, along with teammates Brett Favre, Chad Clifton, Donald Driver, and Aaron Kampman, as well as head coach Mike McCarthy.

==== 2008 ====
Harris was originally thought to be out for the remainder of the 2008 season because of a ruptured spleen suffered during the first quarter of the game against Dallas, when he collided with fellow Green Bay Packer A. J. Hawk. However, Harris came back to the Packers in their game against the Tennessee Titans on November 2, 2008.

==== 2009 ====
On November 22, 2009, Al Harris suffered a potentially career-ending injury to the outside of his left knee in a home game against the San Francisco 49ers. Harris fell to the ground while trailing Niners wide receiver Michael Crabtree; no contact caused the injury, Harris reported his foot simply 'got caught in the ground'. Harris tore the anterior cruciate ligament, the lateral collateral ligament, the iliotibial band, the fibular collateral ligament, and the lateral hamstring. His knee was surgically reconstructed eight days later resulting in Harris spending the remainder of the season rehabilitating his knee.

==== 2010 ====
Harris started the 2010 season on the 'Physically Unable to Perform (PUP)' list, then returned to practice on October 19.

On November 8, 2010, he was taken off the list and waived by the Green Bay Packers. He passed through waivers unclaimed, making him a free agent. Green Bay paid Harris the prorated portion of his $2.5 million salary, as the team was not obligated to pay the rest even though he passed through waivers.

On Sunday, November 21, 2010, Harris took out a large advertisement in the Milwaukee Journal Sentinel, thanking Packer fans for 'always supporting (him)'. The Packers won the Super Bowl that year, and Harris received a championship ring.

=== Miami Dolphins ===
Harris signed a 1-year deal with the Miami Dolphins on November 10, 2010. He played three games before suffering a hamstring injury and was placed on injured reserve. On December 30, 2010, the Dolphins reached an injury settlement with Harris and he was released.

=== St. Louis Rams ===
On July 29, 2011, Harris agreed to terms with the St. Louis Rams. On November 13, 2011, Harris suffered a torn ACL in his right knee during a regular season game against the Cleveland Browns and did not return to the game.

The following day, November 14, 2011, Harris was placed on injured reserve.

=== Retirement ===
On May 1, 2013, Ted Thompson, Packers Executive Vice President, General Manager and Director of Football Operations, stated that Al Harris had informed the team of his decision to retire as a Green Bay Packer. When asked to comment Harris said, "Just over my career I had an awesome time, but the better part of my years were in Green Bay, (so) it was just important to me to retire as a Packer," nearly three-and-a-half years since he played his final snap for the Packers. "I had a great experience in Philadelphia, great experience in Tampa and everywhere else I played, but Green Bay is a special place to play football." In 2021, Harris was inducted into the Green Bay Packers Hall of Fame.

== Coaching career ==
=== Miami Dolphins ===
During the 2012 season, Harris served as a coaching intern under coach Joe Philbin for the Miami Dolphins.

=== Kansas City Chiefs ===
Harris was hired as the assistant defensive backs coach for the Kansas City Chiefs under his former head coach from his playing day with the Eagles, Andy Reid, on January 25, 2013. Following a disappointing performance by the Chiefs defense in the AFC Championship game for the 2018 season, the entire defensive coaching staff, including Harris, was replaced.

=== Dallas Cowboys ===
In 2020, Harris was hired to work as the Dallas Cowboys' secondary coach, reuniting him with former Packers coach and new Cowboys head coach Mike McCarthy. Under Harris' coaching in 2021, sophomore cornerback Trevon Diggs tied a franchise record 11 interceptions on the year, and he was named to the Pro Bowl and First-Team All Pro. In 2023, another sophomore cornerback, DaRon Bland, set the NFL record for most pick-sixes in a single season with 5, and he too was named a Pro Bowler and First-Team All Pro as he led the league in interceptions.

=== Chicago Bears ===
In January 2025, Harris was hired by the Chicago Bears as their defensive backs coach and defensive passing game coordinator under new head coach Ben Johnson. He had previously coached alongside Johnson on the Dolphins' staff in 2012.

The 2025 Bears defense led the league in interceptions with 23. Safety Kevin Byard had a league-high seven interceptions while cornerback Nahshon Wright topped all NFL cornerbacks with five picks, earning both of them Pro Bowl selections. Wright, who was considered a fringe player before joining the Bears in 2025, credited Harris at the Pro Bowl as "the reason why I'm standing here today." Johnson also praised Harris for doing a "phenomenal phenomenal job" throughout the season.

== NFL statistics ==
Year	Team	G	GS	TTkl	Ast	Sacks	Int	Yds	Avg	Lg	TD	PD	FF	FR
1998	Philadelphia Eagles	16	7	43	1	0	0	0	0	0	0	7	0	0
1999	Philadelphia Eagles	16	6	38	6	0	4	151	37.8	84	1	17	0	0
2000	Philadelphia Eagles	16	4	27	2	0	0	1	1	1	0	3	0	0
2001	Philadelphia Eagles	16	2	22	2	0	2	22	11	14	0	10	0	0
2002	Philadelphia Eagles	16	2	24	2	0	1	0	0	0	0	13	0	0
2003	Green Bay Packers	16	16	48	2	0	3	89	29.7	56t	1	11	1	0
2004	Green Bay Packers	16	16	62	6	0	1	29	29	29	0	28	0	0
2005	Green Bay Packers	16	16	62	6	3	3	30	10.0	22t	1	10	1	0
2006	Green Bay Packers	16	16	41	6	0	3	39	13.0	34	0	14	0	0
2007	Green Bay Packers	16	16	37	4	0	2	17	8.5	17	0	9	0	0
2008	Green Bay Packers	12	12	25	1	0	0	0	0.0	0	0	9	0	0
2009	Green Bay Packers	10	10	34	5	1	2	29	14.5	29	0	5	0	1
2010	Miami Dolphins	3	0	3	0	0	0	0	0	0	0	0	0	0
2011	St. Louis Rams	9	5	12	3	0	0	0	0	0	0	7	0	1
Total		194	128	424	46	4	21	407	19.3	84	3	143	2	2

Stats from Pro Football Reference
