= 1985 Minnesota Vikings season =

NFL team season

- Owner: Max Winter
- General manager: Mike Lynn
- Head coach: Bud Grant
- Home stadium: Metrodome

Results
- Record: 7–9
- Division place: 3rd NFC Central
- Playoffs: Did not qualify
- Pro Bowlers: S Joey Browner

The 1985 season was the Minnesota Vikings' 25th in the National Football League. Under returning head coach Bud Grant, they finished with a 7–9 record and missed the playoffs for a third season in a row. At the end of the season, Grant retired for good after 18 years with the franchise.

== Offseason ==
=== 1985 draft ===
Pro Bowler

1985 Minnesota Vikings draft selections
Round	Selection	Player	Position	College	Notes
1	2	Traded to the Atlanta Falcons (Note: The Vikings traded a first-round selection (2nd overall) to the Falcons in exchange for first- and third-round selections (4th and 60th overall).)			from Oilers (Note: The Vikings traded a first-round selection (3rd overall) and a provisional second-round selection (30th overall) to the Oilers in exchange for a first-round selection (2nd overall). As part of the trade, the Vikings agreed not to select DE Ray Childress or trade the pick to a team that would draft him. Houston selected Childress with the 3rd overall pick and this provisional selection was returned to Minnesota.)
1	3	Traded to the Houston Oilers			
1	4	Chris Doleman	Defensive end	Pittsburgh	from Falcons
2	30	Issiac Holt	Cornerback	Alcorn State	Provisional trade not exercised
3	59	Kirk Lowdermilk	Center	Ohio State	
3	60	Tim Meamber	Linebacker	Washington	from Falcons
3	66	Tim Long	Offensive tackle	Memphis State	from Chargers (Note: The Vikings traded CB John Turner to the Chargers in exchange for a third-round selection (66th overall).)
4	85	Buster Rhymes	Wide receiver	Oklahoma	
4	106	Kyle Morrell	Defensive back	BYU	from Rams (Note: The Vikings traded QB Steve Dils to the Rams in exchange for a fourth-round selection (106th overall).)
5	115	Mark MacDonald	Guard	Boston College	
6	142	Steve Bono	Quarterback	UCLA	
6	164	Tim Newton	Defensive tackle	Florida	from Raiders (Note: The Vikings traded LB Brad Van Pelt to the Raiders in exchange for a sixth-round selection (164th overall) and a 1986 second-round selection (53rd overall).)
7	171	Traded to the Green Bay Packers (Note: The Vikings traded a seventh-round selection (171st overall) to the Packers in exchange for K Jan Stenerud.)			
8	198	Nikita Blair	Linebacker	UTEP	
9	227	Jamie Covington	Running back	Syracuse	
10	254	Juan Johnson	Wide receiver	Langston	
11	283	Tim Williams	Defensive back	North Carolina A&T	
12	310	Byron Jones	Defensive tackle	Tulsa	

== Personnel ==
=== Staff ===
1985 Minnesota Vikings staff
Front office: Chairman of the Board – John Skoglund; President – Max Winter; Executive vice president/general manager – Mike Lynn; Senior vice president – Jack Steele; Secretary/treasurer – Sheldon Kaplan; Director of football operations – Jerry Reichow; Director of player personnel – Frank Gilliam; Head scout – Ralph Kohl; Assistant head scout – Don Deisch; Regional scout – John Carson; Equipment manager – Dennis Ryan; Film director – Larry Kohout; Head coaches: Head coach – Bud Grant; Assistant head coach/offensive coordinator – Jerry Burns; Offensive coaches: Running backs – Marc Trestman; Receivers – Dick Rehbein; Offensive line – John Michels	Defensive coaches: Defensive coordinator – Bob Hollway; Defensive line – Paul Wiggin; Linebackers – Floyd Reese; Defensive backs – Pete Carroll; Special teams coaches: Defensive assistant/kicking teams – Tom Batta; Strength and conditioning: Trainer – Fred Zamberletti; Assistant trainer – Larry Neumann; Team physician – David Fischer

=== Roster ===
1985 Minnesota Vikings roster
Quarterbacks (QB): 13 Steve Bono; 9 Tommy Kramer; 11 Wade Wilson; Running backs (RB): 46 Alfred Anderson; 23 Ted Brown; 20 Darrin Nelson; 36 Allen Rice; Wide receivers (WR): 81 Anthony Carter; 89 Mike Jones; 87 Leo Lewis; 88 Buster Rhymes; 85 Sammy White; Tight ends (TE): 84 Jay Carroll; 83 Steve Jordan; 86 Mike Mularkey	Offensive linemen (OL): 62 Brent Boyd G; 51 Jim Hough C; 72 Dave Huffman T; 76 Tim Irwin T; 63 Kirk Lowdermilk C; 71 Mark MacDonald G; 68 Curtis Rouse T; 67 Dennis Swilley C; 66 Terry Tausch G; Defensive linemen (DL): 73 Neil Elshire DE; 79 Doug Martin DE; 75 Keith Millard DE; 77 Mark Mullaney DE; 96 Tim Newton NT; 74 Robert Smith DE	Linebackers (LB): 59 Matt Blair OLB; 56 Chris Doleman OLB; 50 Dennis Fowlkes ILB; 99 David Howard ILB; 57 Chris Martin OLB; 55 Scott Studwell ILB; Defensive backs (DB): 47 Joey Browner SS; 30 Issiac Holt CB; 39 Carl Lee CB; 49 Keith Nord FS; 28 Ted Rosnagle SS; 37 Willie Teal CB; 27 John Turner FS; Special teams (ST): 8 Greg Coleman P; 3 Jan Stenerud K	Reserve: 58 Walker Lee Ashley LB (IR); 21 Rufus Bess CB (IR); 64 Grant Feasel C (IR); 80 Jim Gustafson WR (IR); 61 Wes Hamilton G (IR); 44 Keith Kidd WR (IR); 54 Fred McNeill LB (IR); 53 Tim Meamber LB (IR); 35 Kyle Morrell S (IR); -- Toussaint Tyler RB (IR); Rookies in italics

== Preseason ==
Week	Date	Opponent	Result	Record	Venue	Attendance
1	August 10	at Miami Dolphins	W 16–13 (OT)	1–0	Miami Orange Bowl	41,129
2	August 17	Pittsburgh Steelers	W 41–34	2–0	Hubert H. Humphrey Metrodome	56,887
3	August 24	Seattle Seahawks	L 10–27	2–1	Hubert H. Humphrey Metrodome	56,562
4	August 30	at Denver Broncos	W 13–9	3–1	Mile High Stadium	69,373

== Regular season ==
=== Schedule ===
Week	Date	Opponent	Result	Record	Venue	Attendance
1	September 8	San Francisco 49ers	W 28–21	1–0	Hubert H. Humphrey Metrodome	57,375
2	September 15	at Tampa Bay Buccaneers	W 31–16	2–0	Tampa Stadium	46,188
3	September 19	Chicago Bears	L 24–33	2–1	Hubert H. Humphrey Metrodome	61,242
4	September 29	at Buffalo Bills	W 27–20	3–1	Rich Stadium	45,667
5	October 6	at Los Angeles Rams	L 10–13	3–2	Anaheim Stadium	61,139
6	October 13	at Green Bay Packers	L 17–20	3–3	Milwaukee County Stadium	54,674
7	October 20	San Diego Chargers	W 21–17	4–3	Hubert H. Humphrey Metrodome	61,670
8	October 27	at Chicago Bears	L 9–27	4–4	Soldier Field	63,815
9	November 3	Detroit Lions	W 16–13	5–4	Hubert H. Humphrey Metrodome	58,012
10	November 10	Green Bay Packers	L 17–27	5–5	Hubert H. Humphrey Metrodome	59,970
11	November 17	at Detroit Lions	L 21–41	5–6	Silverdome	54,647
12	November 24	New Orleans Saints	L 23–30	5–7	Hubert H. Humphrey Metrodome	54,117
13	December 1	at Philadelphia Eagles	W 28–23	6–7	Veterans Stadium	54,688
14	December 8	Tampa Bay Buccaneers	W 26–7	7–7	Hubert H. Humphrey Metrodome	51,593
15	December 15	at Atlanta Falcons	L 13–14	7–8	Atlanta Fulton County Stadium	14,167
16	December 22	Philadelphia Eagles	L 35–37	7–9	Hubert H. Humphrey Metrodome	49,722

=== Standings ===
NFC Central
	W	L	T	PCT	DIV	CONF	PF	PA	STK
^{(1)} Chicago Bears	15	1	0	.938	8–0	12–0	456	198	W3
Green Bay Packers	8	8	0	.500	6–2	8–4	337	355	W2
Minnesota Vikings	7	9	0	.438	3–5	5–9	346	359	L2
Detroit Lions	7	9	0	.438	2–6	5–7	307	366	L3
Tampa Bay Buccaneers	2	14	0	.125	1–7	2–10	294	448	L4

== Statistics ==
=== Team leaders ===
Category	Player(s)	Value
Passing yards	Tommy Kramer	3,522
Passing touchdowns	Tommy Kramer	19
Rushing yards	Darrin Nelson	893
Rushing touchdowns	Ted Brown	7
Receiving yards	Anthony Carter	821
Receiving touchdowns	Anthony Carter	8
Points	Jan Stenerud	86
Kickoff return yards	Buster Rhymes	1,345
Punt return yards	Darrin Nelson	133
Tackles	Chris Doleman	113
Sacks	Keith Millard	11.0
Interceptions	John Turner	5

=== League rankings ===
Category	Total yards	Yards per game	NFL rank (out of 28)
Passing offense	3,635	227.2	7th
Rushing offense	1,516	94.8	27th
Total offense	5,151	321.9	16th
Passing defense	3,241	202.6	15th
Rushing defense	2,223	138.9	22nd
Total defense	5,464	341.5	16th

== 25th anniversary team ==
The team recognized an all-time team in 1985 as part of the celebration of the 25th season.

Position	Player	Tenure
Offense
QB	Fran Tarkenton	1961–1966, 1972–1978
RB	Bill Brown	1962–1974
RB	Chuck Foreman	1973–1979
WR	Ahmad Rashad	1976–1982
WR	Sammy White	1976–1985
TE	Stu Voigt	1970–1980
OT	Ron Yary	1968–1981
OT	Grady Alderman	1961–1975
G	Ed White	1969–1977
G	Milt Sunde	1964–1974
C	Mick Tingelhoff	1962–1978
Defense
DE	Jim Marshall	1961–1979
DE	Carl Eller	1964–1978
DT	Alan Page	1967–1978
DT	Gary Larsen	1965–1974
OLB	Matt Blair	1974–1985
OLB	Roy Winston	1962–1976
MLB	Jeff Siemon	1972–1982
MLB	Scott Studwell	1977–1990
CB	Bobby Bryant	1968–1980
CB	Ed Sharockman	1961–1972
S	Paul Krause	1968–1979
S	Karl Kassulke	1963–1972
Special teams
K	Fred Cox	1963–1977
P	Greg Coleman	1978–1987
Coach
HC	Bud Grant	1967–1983, 1985
