= Buster Rhymes =

American gridiron football player (born 1962)

No. 88, 80, 32, 1
- Positions: Wide receiver, return specialist

Personal information
- Born: January 27, 1962 (age 64); Miami, Florida, U.S.
- Listed height: 6 ft 2 in (1.88 m)
- Listed weight: 217 lb (98 kg)

Career information
- High school: Northwestern (Miami)
- College: Oklahoma
- NFL draft: 1985: 4th round, 85th overall pick

Career history
- Minnesota Vikings (1985–1986); Winnipeg Blue Bombers (1988–1989)

Awards and highlights
- Grey Cup champion (1988); NFL kickoff return yards leader (1985)

Career NFL statistics
- Receptions: 8
- Receiving yards: 149
- Return yards: 1,558
- Stats at Pro Football Reference

George "Buster" Rhymes (born January 27, 1962) is an American former professional football player who was a wide receiver in the National Football League (NFL) and Canadian Football League (CFL). He is the eponym of rapper Busta Rhymes.

== Biography ==
Born January 27, 1962, in Miami, Rhymes grew up in Liberty City, a neighborhood of Miami, Florida. He attended Miami Northwestern Senior High School, where he played basketball, football, and track. In football, he scored nineteen touchdowns in his senior year, and in basketball, he averaged around 29 points per game. He was named Dade County's Athlete of the Year for 1979–80.

Rhymes committed to the University of Oklahoma under coach Barry Switzer in 1980. He chose Oklahoma to elude Miami, which was experiencing riots at the time, and to follow the footsteps of his favorite player, Elvis Peacock. In his freshman year, he set a running record. He helped the Sooners win the 1981 Orange Bowl. He did not play his junior year in 1982, as he maintained a grade point average of 2.6. Upon his return to play, he was made a receiver, with the running back position being filled by Marcus Dupree.

Rhymes achieved All-American recognition at Oklahoma as a wide receiver. Standing 6 ft 2 in (1.88 m) tall and weighing 218 lb (99 kg), Rhymes was selected by the Minnesota Vikings in the fourth round of the 1985 NFL draft. Rhymes played in two NFL seasons for the Vikings in 1985 and 1986. Leo Suarez of the Miami Herald nicknamed him "Buster The Man with the Luster" or simply "Buster". The nickname later inspired the stage name for Busta Rhymes, who received the suggestion by Chuck D.

In 1985, Rhymes set an NFL single-season record for kick return yardage with 1,345 yards; the league record has since been broken, but the total stood as a Vikings franchise record until broken by Cordarrelle Patterson in the final game of the 2013 season.

After leaving the NFL, Rhymes went to Canada and played for the Winnipeg Blue Bombers of the CFL. He spent two seasons there (1988 and 1989), winning a Grey Cup championship ring in 1988.
