= Alvin Haymond =

American football player (1942–2024)

- Haymond c. 1969

No. 30, 23, 13
- Positions: Cornerback, return specialist

Personal information
- Born: August 31, 1942; New Orleans, Louisiana, U.S.
- Died: March 13, 2024 (aged 81); San Jose, California, U.S.
- Listed height: 6 ft 0 in (1.83 m)
- Listed weight: 194 lb (88 kg)

Career information
- High school: L.B. Landry (New Orleans)
- College: Southern
- NFL draft: 1964: 18th round, 246th overall pick

Career history
- Baltimore Colts (1965–1967); Philadelphia Eagles (1968); Los Angeles Rams (1969–1971); Washington Redskins (1972); Houston Oilers (1973)

Awards and highlights
- 3× NFL punt return yards leader (1965, 1966, 1969); NFL kickoff return yards leader (1970); NFL record: Most seasons leading league in punt return yards: 3 (1965, 1966, 1969)

Career NFL statistics
- Interceptions: 10
- Fumble recoveries: 13
- Kick/punt return yards: 6,586
- Total touchdowns: 5
- Stats at Pro Football Reference

Alvin Henry Haymond (August 31, 1942 – March 13, 2024) was an American football cornerback who played ten seasons in the National Football League (NFL). He was primarily known as a punt and kickoff returner; he was the first (and so far only) player to lead the league in punt return yards in three seasons.

== Early life ==
Haymond was born on August 31, 1942, in Algiers, New Orleans, Louisiana, to Albert Henry Haymond and Ellen Cole (Peterson) Haymond. He attended L.B. Landry High School. Landry won its first state football title in 1959, with Haymond scoring a touchdown in the title game as a halfback on offense. Haymond was also on Landry’s track team. Future American Football League (AFL) and NFL star linebacker and defensive end Rich Jackson was both Haymond’s teammate at Landry (including on the 1959 championship team under coach Felix James), and later in college at Southern University.

== College career ==
Haymond received an athletic scholarship to attend Southern University. He was a two-way player on the school's football team, playing in the Southwestern Athletic Conference (SWAC). Haymond was a halfback on offense and a defensive back. He also specialized in returning punts and kickoffs.

As a sophomore, in an early November 1961 game against Texas College, Haymond had touchdown runs of 64 and 70 yards. Two week later against Wiley College, he returned a punt 51 yards for a touchdown. As a junior defensive halfback in October 1962, he contributed in tackling the Jackson State College quarterback for a safety. As a senior for the 1963 Jaguars, he scored a running touchdown against the Grambling Tigers on offense in a 22–21 Southern victory; and a month later returned an interception 42 yards against Tennessee State for a touchdown, in a 21–9 Southern win. In 1963, Haymond was selected All-SWAC at safety.

In addition to Rich Jackson, one of his Southern teammates was future AFL and NFL wide receiver Frank Pitts. Haymond was also on Southern's track and field team, and was a highly competitive javelin thrower. In 1962, he was named All-SWAC in track.

== Professional football career ==
=== Baltimore Colts ===
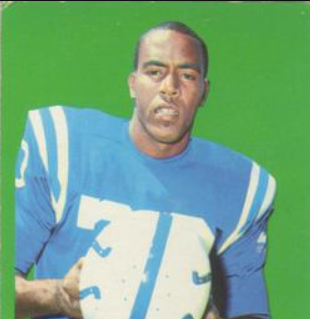
Haymond in 1969.

Haymond was drafted by the Baltimore Colts in the 18th round of the 1964 NFL draft (246th overall). Haymond's principal role with the Colts was as a kickoff and punt returner, though he also played defensive back, and on special teams (suicide squad) in a role other than as return man. He played four years for the Colts (1964-67), during which time the team had a record of 42–11–3.

In his rookie year, Haymond returned only one kick and one punt, but in 1965, he had 41 punt returns for 403 yards (both league highs), with a 9.8 yard average return (3rd highest in the league). He also returned 20 kickoffs for 614 yards, averaging 30.7 yards per kick return, second in the NFL behind all-time great kick returner Gale Sayers. In 1966, he led the league again in punt returns (40) and punt return yardage (347), including a career best 64-yard return, and his 8.7 average yards per return was third in the league.

He also played as a defensive back for the Colts from 1965-67, and had a total of nine interceptions, two of which he returned for touchdowns. In a 1965 game against the Washington Redskins (now Washington Commanders), Haymond intercepted a pass thrown by future hall of fame quarterback Sonny Jurgensen and ran it back for the first one of those touchdowns. Upon scoring, he threw his spread arms in the air to celebrate, the first time this occurred in the NFL. At that time, what would become a routine celebration was considered bad sportsmanship, and his own coach Don Shula reprimanded Haymond. His career high four interceptions came in 1966, playing free safety for the Colts.

He was the Associated Press's Defensive Player of the Week for his performance in a late September 1966 game against the San Francisco 49ers. A year earlier, 49ers receiver Dave Parks had over 200 receiving yards against Haymond. Shula put him in at safety in the 1966 49ers game because starter Jim Welch was injured, and Haymond felt considerable pressure because of his poor performance one year earlier. Haymond's interception late in the first half was the key defensive play in the game, leading to a touchdown and a 36–14 Colts' win. He also had several vicious tackles, knocked down passes and executed two perfect safety blitzes in the game; while also returning four punts for 97 yards.

He played one more year for the Colts, but only in eight games, and was traded to the Philadelphia Eagles for Timmy Brown before the 1968 season.

=== Last pro years ===
Haymond played one season for the Eagles (1968), returning only 15 punts, but one return was for a touchdown and his average was 13.4 yards per return. He also returned a kickoff 98 yards for a touchdown, and had an interception playing cornerback (the last one of his career). His punt return average was actually higher than official league leader Chuck Latourette (12.3 yards), who returned 28 punts that year.

The Los Angeles Rams and head coach George Allen traded Billy Guy Anderson, Jimmy Raye and a future draft pick to the Eagles for Haymond in 1969. Allen called Haymond the league's best return man. In 1969 for the Rams, he led the league in punt return yardage for the third time, with 435 yards on 33 returns. His average return of 13.2 yards per punt also led the league. In 1970, he had career highs in the number of punt (53) and kickoff (35) returns, and his 53 punt returns and 1,022 yards in kickoff returns led the league. Haymond's 29.2 yard per kick return average was fourth in the league, and 376 yards in punt returns was second in the league. He also had another 98 yard kickoff return for a touchdown.

He played one more year for the Rams (1971), but in only ten games, returning only 24 punts and 9 kickoffs. He played for Washington in 1972, where Allen was now the head coach, returning only six punts and ten kickoffs. Playing for Washington in Super Bowl VII, however, he returned two kickoffs and four punts in a 14–7 loss to the Miami Dolphins (playing against his old Baltimore coach, Don Shula). His final season (1973) was with the Houston Oilers, where he returned 14 punts and 28 kickoffs. His total kickoff returns (28) and yards (703) both ranked fifth in the league, and his 25.1 yards per kickoff return ranked 7th in 1973.

=== Career assessment ===
In 1965, 1969 and 1970, Haymond led the NFL in combined punt and kick return yards. In NFL history, as of 2024, his total of 4,438 yards in kickoff returns ranks 53rd, his 2,148 yards in punt returns ranks 34th, and his 26.1 yards per kick return career average ranks 26th, as does his 423 combined kick and punt returns.

== Personal life ==
After retirement from the NFL, Haymond was a high school coach and athletic director. As a result of playing football, Haymond underwent knee and hip replacements, and back, neck, shoulder, elbow, hand and wrist surgeries; though in his later years he worked hard to stay fit.

== Death ==
Haymond died on March 13, 2024, in San Jose, California, and was buried there on April 6, 2024. He was survived by his wife Shirley Arnett Haymond and sons Michael Stykes-Haymond and Alvin H. Haymond Jr.
