= List of Texas A&M–Kingsville Javelinas in the NFL draft =

This is a list of Texas A&M–Kingsville Javelinas football players in the NFL draft.

== Key ==
B	Back	K	Kicker	NT	Nose tackle
C	Center	LB	Linebacker	FB	Fullback
DB	Defensive back	P	Punter	HB	Halfback
DE	Defensive end	QB	Quarterback	WR	Wide receiver
DT	Defensive tackle	RB	Running back	G	Guard
E	End	T	Offensive tackle	TE	Tight end

== Selections ==
Year	Round	Pick	Overall	Player	Team	Position
1942	22	5	200	Stu Clarkson	Chicago Bears	C
1949	24	5	236	Ivan Snowden	Pittsburgh Steelers	T
1957	15	4	173	Hall Whitley	Baltimore Colts	C
1963	12	13	167	Tom Janik	Detroit Lions	DB
1964	3	14	42	Sid Blanks	Chicago Bears	RB
1966	1	16	16	Randy Johnson	Atlanta Falcons	QB
1967	1	17	17	Gene Upshaw	Oakland Raiders	G
1968	1	18	18	Jim Hill	San Diego Chargers	DB
1969	9	15	223	Ray Hickl	New York Giants	LB
1969	12	24	310	Butch Riley	Baltimore Colts	LB
1970	2	15	41	Al Matthews	Green Bay Packers	DB
1971	2	9	35	Dwight Harrison	Denver Broncos	WR
1971	3	26	78	Karl Douglas	Baltimore Colts	QB
1971	11	3	263	Andy Browder	Buffalo Bills	T
1972	1	17	17	Eldridge Small	New York Giants	DB
1972	5	17	121	Larry Edwards	New York Giants	LB
1973	1	17	17	Ernie Price	Detroit Lions	DE
1973	3	23	75	Levi Johnson	Detroit Lions	DB
1973	10	13	247	James Krempin	New York Jets	T
1975	1	15	15	Don Hardeman	Houston Oilers	RB
1976	2	18	46	David Hill	Detroit Lions	TE
1976	4	2	94	Gerald Taylor	Los Angeles Rams	WR
1977	2	19	47	George Franklin	St. Louis Cardinals	RB
1978	2	14	42	John Barefield	St. Louis Cardinals	LB
1978	3	11	67	Larry Collins	Cleveland Browns	RB
1978	3	13	69	Doug Greene	St. Louis Cardinals	DB
1978	6	8	146	Glenn Starks	Seattle Seahawks	WR
1978	7	22	188	Mike Hawkins	New England Patriots	LB
1978	10	22	272	Hughie Shaw	Minnesota Vikings	RB
1979	12	23	326	Brian Sweeney	Detroit Lions	WR
1980	10	4	253	Jafus White	Green Bay Packers	DB
1980	10	18	267	Andy Hawkins	Tampa Bay Buccaneers	LB
1981	7	27	193	Don Washington	Houston Oilers	DB
1982	6	18	157	Durwood Roquemore	Kansas City Chiefs	DB
1983	1	28	28	Darrell Green	Washington Redskins	DB
1984	7	28	196	Lloyd Lewis	Minnesota Vikings	G
1989	6	23	162	Heath Sherman	Philadelphia Eagles	RB
1989	11	5	284	Rod Mounts	Tampa Bay Buccaneers	G
1990	9	8	228	Johnny Bailey	Chicago Bears	RB
1990	12	19	323	Kerry Simien	Cleveland Browns	WR
1991	10	5	255	Herbie Anderson	Phoenix Cardinals	DB
1993	3	25	81	Earl Dotson	Green Bay Packers	T
1994	3	7	72	Anthony Phillips	Atlanta Falcons	DB
1995	7	19	227	Jeffrey Rodgers	Tampa Bay Buccaneers	DE
1996	1	25	25	Jermane Mayberry	Philadelphia Eagles	G
1997	6	6	169	Al Harris	Tampa Bay Buccaneers	DB
2000	7	38	244	Giles Cole	Minnesota Vikings	TE
2001	4	4	99	Roberto Garza	Atlanta Falcons	C
