= Bruce Harper =

American football player (born 1955)

No. 42
- Positions: Running back, return specialist

Personal information
- Born: June 20, 1955 (age 71); Englewood, New Jersey, U.S.
- Listed height: 5 ft 8 in (1.73 m)
- Listed weight: 174 lb (79 kg)

Career information
- High school: Dwight Morrow (Englewood)
- College: Kutztown
- NFL draft: 1977: undrafted

Career history
- New York Jets (1977–1984)

Awards and highlights
- 3× NFL kickoff return yards leader (1977–1979); NFL record: Most seasons leading league in kickoff return yards: 3 (1977–1979; tied with Tyrone Hughes)

Career NFL statistics
- Rushing yards: 1,829
- Rushing average: 4.9
- Rushing touchdowns: 8
- Receptions: 220
- Receiving yards: 2,409
- Receiving touchdowns: 12
- Return yards: 7,191
- Return touchdowns: 1
- Stats at Pro Football Reference

Bruce S. Harper (born June 20, 1955) is an American former professional football player who was a running back and return specialist for the New York Jets of the National Football League (NFL). He played college football for the Kutztown Golden Bears and was signed as an undrafted free agent by the Jets after the 1977 NFL draft.

== Early life ==
Harper played high school football at Dwight Morrow High School in Englewood, New Jersey.

== College career ==
Harper attended the Kutztown State College—now Kutztown University of Pennsylvania, where he became the school's first 1,000 yards rusher.

== Professional career ==
Harper is the all-time kick returner leader in New York Jets history with 5,407 yards in kickoff returns. He also served as the Jets punt returner from 1977 to 1982, totalling 1,784 punt return yards and one touchdown.

His total yards are 11,429: 1,829 rushing, 2,409 receiving, 1,784 punt return and 5,407 kickoff return yards.

Harper's no. 42 jersey is the jersey worn by diehard Jets fan Fireman Ed.

== NFL career statistics ==
Legend
**Bold**	Career high

=== Regular season ===
Year	Team	Games		Rushing					Receiving				
Year	Team	GP	GS	Att	Yds	Avg	Lng	TD	Rec	Yds	Avg	Lng	TD
1977	NYJ	14	1	44	198	4.5	18	0	21	209	10.0	55	1
1978	NYJ	**16**	0	58	303	5.2	32	2	13	196	**15.1**	44	2
1979	NYJ	**16**	0	65	282	4.3	31	0	17	250	14.7	**72**	2
1980	NYJ	15	1	45	126	2.8	22	0	50	**634**	12.7	52	**3**
1981	NYJ	**16**	**7**	**81**	**393**	4.9	29	**4**	**52**	459	8.8	24	1
1982	NYJ	9	0	20	125	6.3	40	0	14	177	12.6	39	1
1983	NYJ	9	2	51	354	**6.9**	**78**	1	48	413	8.6	33	2
1984	NYJ	4	0	10	48	4.8	16	1	5	71	14.2	28	0
		99	11	374	1,829	4.9	78	8	220	2,409	11.0	72	12

=== Playoffs ===
Year	Team	Games		Rushing					Receiving				
Year	Team	GP	GS	Att	Yds	Avg	Lng	TD	Rec	Yds	Avg	Lng	TD
1981	NYJ	1	0	0	0	0.0	0	0	1	4	4.0	4	0
1982	NYJ	**2**	0	**2**	**9**	**4.5**	**9**	0	**6**	**49**	**8.2**	**19**	0
		3	0	2	9	4.5	9	0	7	53	7.6	19	0

== Personal life ==
Harper was a longtime resident of Norwood, New Jersey, but now lives in Closter, New Jersey.

Harper is founder and director of the non-for-profit organization Heroes & Cool Kids, established in 1998. Based in school systems throughout New Jersey, the mentoring program reaches out to elementary and middle-school kids by high school athletes and students of the same district. The high school students are trained through the Heroes and Cool Kids' curriculum and by former professional athletes, such as former NFL player, Keith Elias, former Los Angeles Lakers player, John Celestand, and former New Jersey Nets player, Tim Bassett.
