= Greg Coleman (American football) =

American football player (born 1954)

No. 9, 8, 15
- Position: Punter

Personal information
- Born: September 9, 1954 (age 72); Jacksonville, Florida, U.S.
- Listed height: 6 ft 0 in (1.83 m)
- Listed weight: 185 lb (84 kg)

Career information
- High school: William M. Raines (Jacksonville)
- College: Florida A&M (1973–1976)
- NFL draft: 1976: 14th round, 398th overall pick

Career history
- Cleveland Browns (1977); Minnesota Vikings (1978–1987); Washington Redskins (1988)

Awards and highlights
- Minnesota Vikings 25th Anniversary Team; Minnesota Vikings 40th Anniversary Team

Career NFL statistics
- Punts: 820
- Punting yards: 33,285
- Punting average: 40.6
- Longest punt: 73
- Stats at Pro Football Reference

Gregory Jerome Coleman (born September 9, 1954) is an American former professional football player who was a punter for 12 seasons in the National Football League (NFL) with the Cleveland Browns, Minnesota Vikings, and Washington Redskins. He played college football for the Florida A&M Rattlers. He was selected 398th overall in the 14th round of the 1976 NFL Draft. Coleman is a member of Alpha Phi Alpha fraternity

Coleman was the Vikings sideline reporter for KFAN, until the end of the 2021 season. He is the cousin of former Major League Baseball (MLB) outfielder Vince Coleman. Early in his career, he earned the nickname "Coffin Corner" because of his ability to aim his kicks near the corner of the playing field where the end zone and out-of-bounds lines meet. Due to his uncharacteristic speed (for a punter) defenses often lined up to guard against a fake punt because he was a threat to run for a first down.

He is known as being one of the few African American punters who played in the NFL, with Dave Lewis of the Cincinnati Bengals being the first. Coleman was enshrined in the Black College Football Hall of Fame in 2021. He was selected by the fans to be a member of the Viking 40th Anniversary team. He is a member of the Florida A&M Football Hall of Fame and is also a member of the State of Florida Track and Field Hall of Fame.

== NFL career statistics ==
Legend
	Led the league
**Bold**	Career high

=== Regular season ===
Year	Team	Punting									
Year	Team	GP	Punts	Yds	Net Yds	Lng	Avg	Net Avg	Blk	Ins20	TB
1977	CLE	14	61	2,389	1,791	58	39.2	29.4	0	23	2
1978	MIN	9	51	1,991	1,610	61	39.0	31.0	**1**	12	3
1979	MIN	**16**	90	3,551	3,017	70	39.5	33.2	**1**	22	9
1980	MIN	**16**	81	3,139	2,700	65	38.8	33.3	0	20	9
1981	MIN	15	88	3,646	3,027	**73**	41.4	34.4	0	17	**11**
1982	MIN	9	58	2,384	2,088	67	41.1	36.0	0	7	6
1983	MIN	**16**	**91**	**3,780**	**3,323**	65	41.5	36.5	0	**28**	8
1984	MIN	**16**	82	3,473	2,998	62	42.4	36.6	0	16	2
1985	MIN	**16**	67	2,867	2,459	62	**42.8**	**36.7**	0	12	4
1986	MIN	**16**	67	2,774	2,341	69	41.4	34.9	0	14	4
1987	MIN	9	45	1,786	1,403	54	39.7	30.5	**1**	5	3
1988	WAS	10	39	1,505	1,140	53	38.6	29.2	0	8	3
Career		162	820	33,285	27,897	73	40.6	33.9	3	184	64

=== Playoffs ===
Year	Team	Punting									
Year	Team	GP	Punts	Yds	Net Yds	Lng	Avg	Net Avg	Blk	Ins20	TB
1978	MIN	1	6	248	166	49	**41.3**	27.7	0	1	0
1980	MIN	1	5	200	179	52	40.0	**35.8**	0	0	0
1982	MIN	**2**	**8**	**317**	**288**	**61**	39.6	32.0	**1**	**2**	**1**
Career		4	19	765	633	61	40.3	31.7	1	3	1
