= List of NFL annual kickoff return yards leaders =

In American football, a kickoff is a method of starting a drive-in gridiron football that occurs at the start of each half or after scoring that can be returned for yards. The number of kickoff return yards a player makes is a recorded statistic in football games. Statistics were not recorded until 1941. The history of the returner generally saw receivers used for the position, most notably with Deion Sanders. Only one return specialist has been inducted into the Hall of Fame with Devin Hester. This is a list of National Football League kickoff returners who have led the regular season in kickoff return yards each year. In addition to the overall National Football League (NFL) kickoff return yards leaders, league record books recognize the kickoff return yard leaders of the American Football League (AFL), which operated from 1960 to 1969 before being absorbed into the NFL in 1970. The NFL also recognizes the statistics of the All-America Football Conference, which operated from 1946 to 1949 before three of its teams were merged into the NFL, since 2025.

Bruce Harper and Tyrone Hughes have led the NFL in kickoff return yards three times, more than any other kickoff returner. They are also the only players to lead the league three times consecutively, with Harper doing so from 1977 through 1979 and Hughes doing so from 1994 through 1996. The record for kickoff return yards in a season is held by MarTay Jenkins, who had 2,186 kickoff yards in 2000 for the Arizona Cardinals. He is the only player to record a 2,000 kickoff return yards in a season.

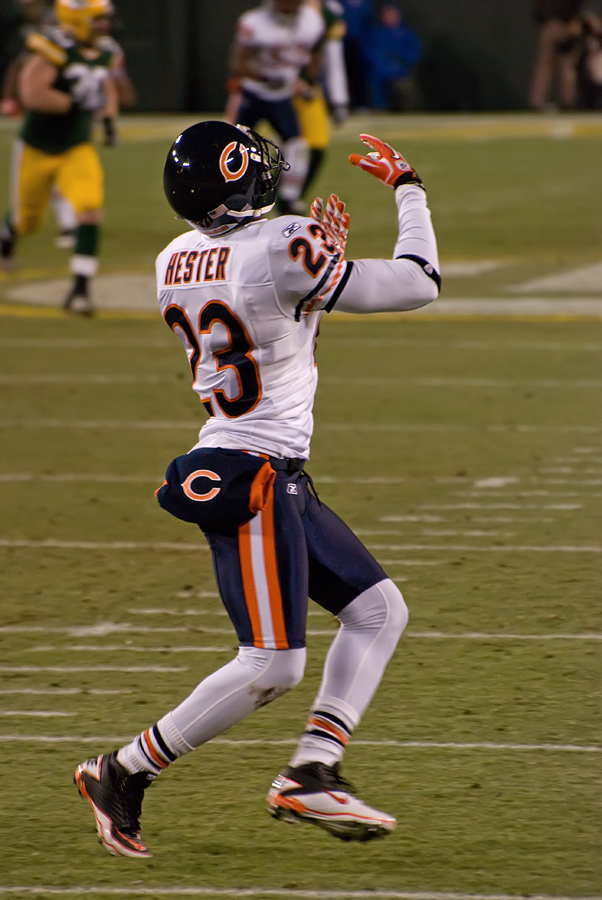
Devin Hester led the league in kickoff return yards in 2013 and 2014. In addition to being the only player to return the opening kickoff of a Super Bowl for a touchdown, he is the only primary return specialist to be enshrined in the Pro Football Hall of Fame.

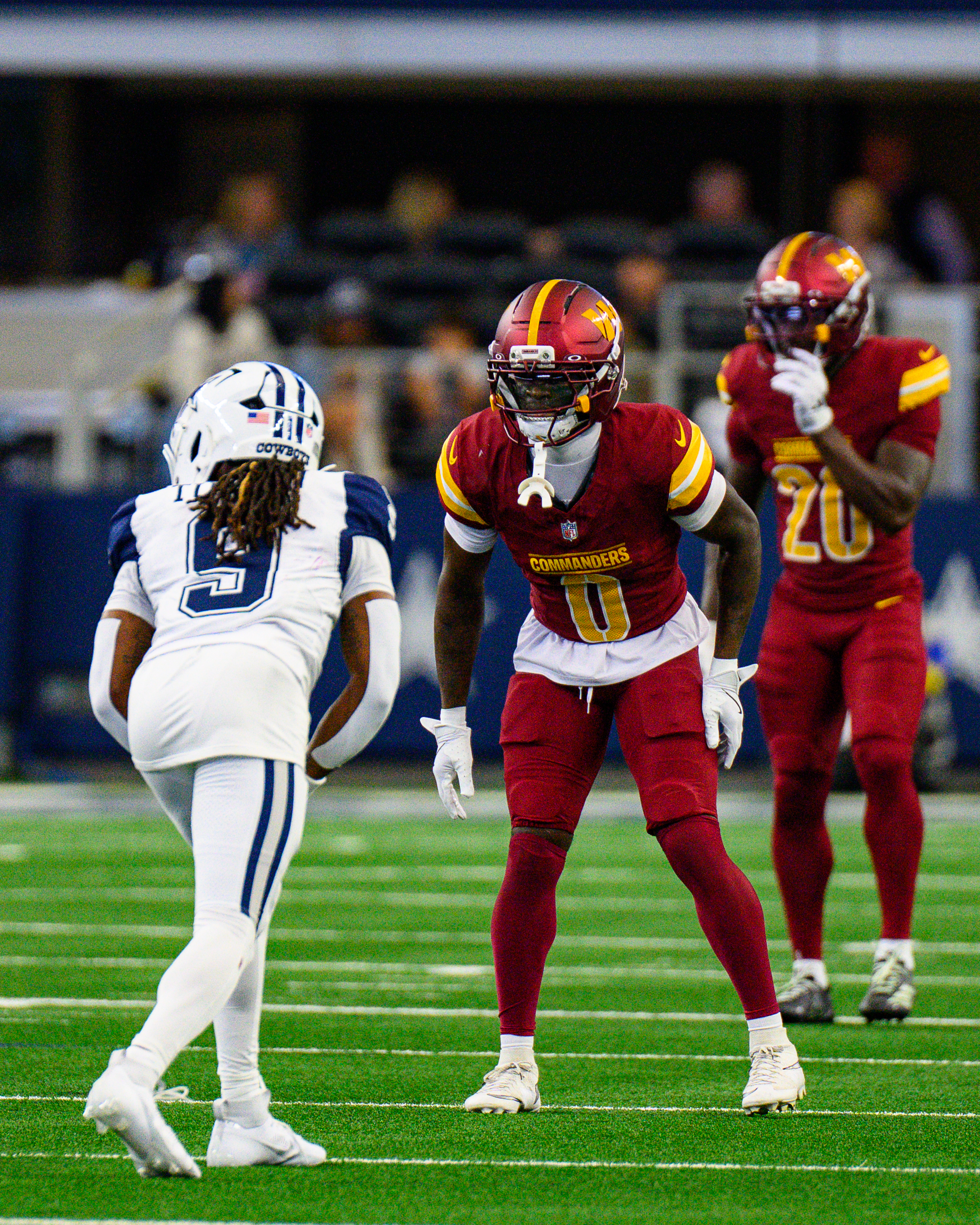
KaVontae Turpin is the most recent player to lead the league in kickoff return yards in consecutive seasons (2024–2025).

== NFL annual kick return yards leaders ==
According to Pro Football Reference and The Football Database.

Key
Symbol	Meaning
Leader	The player who recorded the most kick return yards in the NFL
Yds	The total number of kick return yards the player had
GP	The number of games played by a player during the season
†	Inducted into the Pro Football Hall of Fame
^	Active player
*	Set the single-season kick return yards record
(#)	Denotes the number of times a player appears in this list

NFL annual kick return yards leaders by season
Season	Leader	Yds	GP	Team
1941	Marshall Goldberg	290*	11	Chicago Cardinals
1942	Marshall Goldberg (2)	393*	11	Chicago Cardinals
1943	Ken Heineman	444*	8	Brooklyn Dodgers
1944	John Grigas	471*	9	Card-Pitt
1945	Frank Seno	408	9	Chicago Cardinals
1946	Sonny Karnofsky	599*	11	Boston Yanks
1947	Eddie Saenz	797*	12	Washington Redskins
1948	Dan Sandifer	594	12	Washington Redskins
1949	Don Doll	536	12	Detroit Lions
1950	Vitamin Smith	742	12	Los Angeles Rams
1951	George Taliaferro	622	12	New York Yanks
1952	Buddy Young	643	12	Dallas Texans
1953	Woodley Lewis	830*	12	Los Angeles Rams
1954	Woodley Lewis (2)	836*	12	Los Angeles Rams
1955	Sid Watson	716	12	Pittsburgh Steelers
1956	Al Carmichael	927*	12	Green Bay Packers
1957	Al Carmichael (2)	690	12	Green Bay Packers
1958	Jimmy Sears	756	12	Chicago Cardinals
1959	Lenny Lyles	565	12	San Francisco 49ers
1960	Ted Dean	533	12	Philadelphia Eagles
1961	Timothy Brown	811	13	Philadelphia Eagles
1962	Abe Woodson	1,157*	14	San Francisco 49ers
1963	Timothy Brown (2)	945	14	Philadelphia Eagles
1964	Mel Renfro†	1,017	14	Dallas Cowboys
1965	Kermit Alexander	741	14	San Francisco 49ers
1966	Rod Smith	1,013	14	Atlanta Falcons
1967	Ron Smith (2)	976	13	Atlanta Falcons
1968	Chuck Latourette	1,237*	14	St. Louis Cardinals
1969	Bo Scott	722	13	Cleveland Browns
1970	Alvin Haymond	1,022	14	Los Angeles Rams
1971	Dave Hampton	1,314*	13	Green Bay Packers
1972	Margene Adkins	1,020	14	New Orleans Saints
1973	Mack Herron	1,092	14	New England Patriots
1974	Lou Piccone	961	14	New York Jets
1975	Larry Jones	1,086	14	Washington Redskins
1976	Willie Shelby	761	13	Cincinnati Bengals
1977	Bruce Harper	1,035	14	New York Jets
1978	Bruce Harper (2)	1,280	16	New York Jets
1979	Bruce Harper (3)	1,158	16	New York Jets
1980	Eddie Payton	1,184	16	Minnesota Vikings
1981	Stump Mitchell	1,292	16	Los Angeles Rams
1982	James Brooks	749	9	San Diego Chargers
1983	Zachary Dixon	1,171	15	Baltimore Colts / Seattle Seahawks
1984	Lionel James	959	16	San Diego Chargers
1985	Buster Rhymes	1,345*	15	Minnesota Vikings
1986	Tim McGee	1,007	16	Cincinnati Bengals
1986	Herman Hunter	1,007	16	Detroit Lions
1987	Paul Palmer	923	12	Kansas City Chiefs
1988	Tim Brown†	1,098	16	Los Angeles Raiders
1989	James Dixon	1,181	16	Dallas Cowboys
1990	Eric Metcalf	1,052	16	Cleveland Browns
1991	Mel Gray	929	16	Detroit Lions
1992	Deion Sanders†	1,067	13	Atlanta Falcons
1993	Clarence Verdin	1,050	16	Indianapolis Colts
1994	Tyrone Hughes	1,556*	15	New Orleans Saints
1995	Tyrone Hughes (2)	1,617*	16	New Orleans Saints
1996	Tyrone Hughes (3)	1,791*	16	New Orleans Saints
1997	Kevin Williams	1,458	16	Arizona Cardinals
1998	Glyn Milburn	1,550	16	Chicago Bears
1999	Brock Marion	1,524	16	Miami Dolphins
2000	MarTay Jenkins	2,186*	16	Arizona Cardinals
2001	Ronney Jenkins	1,541	16	San Diego Chargers
2002	Michael Lewis	1,807	16	New Orleans Saints
2003	Josh Scobey	1,684	15	Arizona Cardinals
2004	Dante Hall	1,718	16	Kansas City Chiefs
2005	Chris Carr	1,752	16	Oakland Raiders
2006	Chris Carr (2)	1,762	16	Oakland Raiders
2007	Josh Cribbs	1,809	16	Cleveland Browns
2008	Josh Wilson	1,753	16	Seattle Seahawks
2009	Danny Amendola	1,618	14	St. Louis Rams
2010	LaRod Stephens-Howling	1,548	13	Arizona Cardinals
2011	Brandon Banks	1,174	16	Washington Redskins
2012	David Wilson	1,533	16	New York Giants
2013	Devin Hester†	1,436	16	Chicago Bears
2014	Devin Hester† (2)	1,128	16	Atlanta Falcons
2015	Ameer Abdullah^	1,077	16	Detroit Lions
2016	Alex Erickson	810	16	Cincinnati Bengals
2017	Tyler Lockett	949	16	Seattle Seahawks
2018	Andre Roberts	1,174	16	New York Jets
2019	Cordarrelle Patterson	825	16	Chicago Bears
2020	Cordarrelle Patterson (2)	1,017	16	Chicago Bears
2021	Andre Roberts (2)	1,010	16	Houston Texans / Los Angeles Chargers
2022	Keisean Nixon^	1,009	17	Green Bay Packers
2023	Keisean Nixon^ (2)	782	17	Green Bay Packers
2024	KaVontae Turpin^	904	17	Dallas Cowboys
2025	KaVontae Turpin^ (2)	1,814	15	Dallas Cowboys

== AFL annual kick return yards leaders ==
Key
Symbol	Meaning
Leader	The player who recorded the most kick return yards in the AFL
Yds	The total number of kick return yards the player had
GP	The number of games played by a player during the season
*	Set the single-season kick return yards record
(#)	Denotes the number of times a player appears in this list

AFL annual kick return yards leaders by season
Season	Leader	Yds	GP	Team	Ref.
1960	Leon Burton	862*	14	New York Titans	
1961	Frank Jackson	645	14	Dallas Texans	
1962	Dick Christy	824	14	New York Titans	
1963	Bobby Jancik	1,317*	14	Houston Oilers	
1964	Odell Barry	1,245	14	Denver Broncos	
1965	Abnet Haynes	901	14	Denver Broncos	
1966	Bobby Jancik (2)	875	14	Houston Oilers	
1967	Noland Smith	1,148	14	Kansas City Chiefs	
1968	Max Anderson	971	14	Buffalo Bills	
1969	Mercury Morris	1,136	14	Miami Dolphins	

== AAFC annual kick return yards leaders ==
Key
Symbol	Meaning
Leader	The player who recorded the most kick return yards in the AAFC
Yds	The total number of kick return yards the player had
GP	The number of games played by a player during the season
*	Set the single-season kick return yards record

AAFC annual kick return yards leaders by season
Season	Leader	Yds	GP	Team	Ref.
1946	Chuck Fenenbock	479*	13	Los Angeles Dons	
1947	Chet Mutryn	691*	14	Buffalo Bills	
1948	Monk Gafford	559	12	Brooklyn Dodgers	
1949	Herman Wedemeyer	602	11	Baltimore Colts	

== Most seasons leading the league ==
Count	Player	Seasons	Team(s)
3	Bruce Harper	1977–1979	New York Jets
3	Tyrone Hughes	1994–1996	New Orleans Saints
2	Timmy Brown	1961, 1963	Philadelphia Eagles
2	Al Carmichael	1956, 1957	Green Bay Packers
2	Chris Carr	2005, 2006	Oakland Raiders
2	Marshall Goldberg	1941, 1942	Chicago Cardinals
2	Devin Hester	2013, 2014	Chicago Bears (1) / Atlanta Falcons (1)
2	Bobby Jancik	1963, 1966	Houston Oilers
2	Woodley Lewis	1953, 1954	Los Angeles Rams
2	Keisean Nixon	2022, 2023	Green Bay Packers
2	Cordarrelle Patterson	2019, 2020	Chicago Bears
2	Andre Roberts	2018, 2021	New York Jets (1) / Houston Texans / Los Angeles Chargers (1)
2	Ron Smith	1966, 1967	Atlanta Falcons
2	KaVontae Turpin	2024, 2025	Dallas Cowboys

== See also ==
- List of NFL career kickoff return yards leaders
