= Dick Evey =

American football player (1941–2013)

No. 79, 82, 77
- Positions: Defensive tackle, Defensive end, Guard

Personal information
- Born: February 13, 1941; State College, Pennsylvania, U.S.
- Died: May 23, 2013 (aged 72); Knoxville, Tennessee, U.S.
- Listed height: 6 ft 4 in (1.93 m)
- Listed weight: 245 lb (111 kg)

Career information
- High school: Springfield (Springfield, Ohio)
- College: Tennessee
- NFL draft: 1964: 1st round, 14th overall pick
- AFL draft: 1964: 2nd round, 12th overall pick

Career history
- Chicago Bears (1964–1969); Los Angeles Rams (1970); Detroit Lions (1971)

Career NFL statistics
- Fumble recoveries: 6
- Interceptions: 2
- Sacks: 27.5
- Stats at Pro Football Reference

Richard Theodore Evey (February 13, 1941 – May 23, 2013) was an American professional football offensive tackle and defensive tackle in the National Football League (NFL). He was drafted by the Chicago Bears in the 1st round (14th overall) of the 1964 NFL Draft. He played most of his career with the Chicago Bears. After his football career, Evey became a land developer in Blount County, Tennessee, where he was involved in restoring historical Perry's Mill, a working gristmill in Walland, Tennessee.

He was traded from the Bears to the Rams for Ron Smith and Jim Seymour on September 1, 1970.

On May 23, 2013, Evey died from dementia and primary progressive aphasia. From 2007 until his death, Evey was a recipient of the 88 Plan, which is designed to help former NFL players suffering from Alzheimer's disease, ALS, and Parkinson's disease by providing $88,000 annually for medical care.
