= Signing bonus =

Employee bonus

A signing bonus or sign-on bonus is a sum of money paid to a new employee (including a professional sports person) by a company as an incentive to join that company. They are often given as a way of making a compensation package more attractive to the employee (e.g., if the annual salary is lower than they desire). It can also lower risk to the employer compared with a higher salary; for example, if the employee does not meet expectations. Signing bonuses are often used in professional sports, and to recruit graduates into their first jobs.

To encourage employees to stay at the organization, there are often clauses in the contract whereby if the employee quits before a specified period, they must return the signing bonus. In sports contracts, the full amount of signing bonuses is not always paid immediately, but spread out over time. In such cases, the main difference between a signing bonus and base salary is that the former is "guaranteed" money meaning the team is required to pay the bonus when due even if it cuts the player, unless the player retires or the contract is otherwise terminated due to a significant breach on the part of the player.

As of March 2019, Aaron Rodgers had received the highest signing bonus in National Football League history, at $57.5 million. As of July 2023, Paul Skenes had received the largest signing bonus in Major League Baseball draft history, at $9.2 million.

== See also ==
- Advance payment
- Bonus rule, a defunct policy within Major League Baseball
- Golden hello
- Play or pay contract
- Roster bonus
