= Tyrone Hughes =

American football player (born 1970)

No. 33, 32
- Position: Cornerback

Personal information
- Born: January 14, 1970 (age 56); New Orleans, Louisiana, U.S.
- Listed height: 5 ft 9 in (1.75 m)
- Listed weight: 175 lb (79 kg)

Career information
- High school: St. Augustine (New Orleans)
- College: Nebraska (1989–1992)
- NFL draft: 1993: 5th round, 137th overall pick

Career history
- New Orleans Saints (1993–1996); Chicago Bears (1997); Baltimore Ravens (1998)*; Dallas Cowboys (1998); Houma Bayou Bucks (2003–2004)
- * Offseason or practice squad member only

Awards and highlights
- Second-team All-Pro (1993); Pro Bowl (1993); 3× NFL kickoff return yards leader (1994–1996); NFL punt return yards leader (1993); PFWA All-Rookie Team (1993); New Orleans Saints Hall of Fame; NFL record: Most seasons leading league in kickoff return yards: 3 (1994–1996; tied with Bruce Harper)

Career NFL statistics
- Tackles: 67
- Interceptions: 4
- Return yards: 8,410
- Return touchdowns: 5
- Stats at Pro Football Reference

Tyrone Christopher Hughes (born January 14, 1970) is an American former professional football player who was a cornerback in the National Football League (NFL) for the New Orleans Saints, Chicago Bears, and Dallas Cowboys. He played college football for the Nebraska Cornhuskers.

== Early life ==
Hughes attended and graduated from St. Augustine High School in New Orleans, where he played football, baseball, basketball and ran track.

He played as a cornerback until his senior season, when he was switched to offense and was named the Louisiana Offensive Player of the Year and the Athlete of the Year. He had 62 carries for 845 yards, 20 receptions for 601 yards and 22 touchdowns from his wingback position. He averaged 40.4 yards on kickoff returns and 14 yards on punt returns.

== College career ==
Hughes accepted a football scholarship from the University of Nebraska–Lincoln. As a freshman, he appeared in 11 games and played as a backup Wingback in a run-oriented offense. He registered 5 receptions for 72 yards and 2 touchdowns, 12 carries for 13 yards. He ranked fourth in the Big Eight Conference in punt returns (15), second in return yards (227) and first in punt return average (15.1).

As a sophomore, he posted 10 carries for 113 yards and one touchdown, 17 carries for 59 yards, while leading the conference in kickoff return yards (523). He ranked second in the conference and 16th in the NCAA in punt returns at 12.4. He was seventh in the conference in all-purpose yards with 92 yards a game. He led the conference, ranked third in the NCAA and set a school single-season record with a 29.1-yard average on 18 kickoff returns. Against Kansas State University, he set a school single-game record with 3 returns for 1,515 yards, including a 99-yarder for a touchdown and tied the NCAA single-game record with 247 total kick returns yards.

As a junior, he opened the season as a starter at Wingback, but suffered a broken wrist in the eighth game against the University of Colorado Boulder. The injury forced him to switch to cornerback for the final 4 games. He tallied 12 receptions for 208 yards and 2 touchdowns, while ranking third in the conference in kickoff returns (16) and second in return yards (338).

As a senior, he started 4 games at Wingback, while seeing time at cornerback and free safety. He had 4 receptions for 58 yards. He was the team's top returner averaging 21.9 yards on kickoffs and 10.4 yards on punts. He ranked second in the conference in kickoff returns (19) and first in return yards (424). He became the first Nebraska player in 26 years to play offense (Wingback) and defense (cornerback) in the same game (against the University of Missouri), when he was designated the spy safety for quarterback Charlie Ward in the 1993 Orange Bowl.

Hughes was a special teams standout, leading the Big Eight Conference in kickoff returns in each of his last three years and his team in each of his four seasons. He finished as the school's record-holder in kickoff returns and second all-time in career punt returns. He finished his college career with 31 receptions for 451 yards, 33 carries for 81 yards, 5 receiving touchdowns, a 12.3-yard average on 68 punt returns, a 23.4-yard average and a touchdown on 65 kickoff returns. In 2000, he was named to the Nebraska Cornhuskers All-Century team.

He ran track for one season as a senior, running the leg of the 4 × 100 metres relay en route to a second-place finish in the Big Eight Conference.

== Professional career ==
=== New Orleans Saints ===
Hughes was selected by the New Orleans Saints in the fifth round (137th overall) of the 1993 NFL draft, with the intention of playing him at cornerback. As a rookie, he played mostly on special teams and only saw time on defense until the season finale, when he was forced into action because of injuries. He had four special teams tackles in the season. In the fifth game against the Los Angeles Rams, he returned a punt 74 yards for a touchdown and his 128 total punt return yards were third-most in Saints history. Against the Minnesota Vikings, he returned a kickoff 99 yards for a touchdown to tie the game, that the Saints won 17–14. Against the Philadelphia Eagles, he set a club record with an 83-yard punt return. He led the league in punt return yards (503) and punt return average (13.6), while being ranked second in kickoff returns with a 25.1-yard average. His 503 punt return yards broke the team record of 436 yards set by Jeff Groth in 1986. He was the first player in franchise history to return 2 punts for touchdowns in a season and a career. He became the fourth rookie in franchise history to earn Pro Bowl recognition. He also received NFL All-rookie honors as a returner.

In 1994, the Saints continued the process of trying to convert him into a cornerback under the tutelage of the secondary assistant coach Jim L. Mora, with mixed results. It proved to be his best season, as he started in 4 games at right cornerback and one as part of a 6 defensive back set. He recorded 36 tackles (31 solo), 2 interceptions, 7 passes defensed, 2 fumble recoveries and 2 fumbles returned for touchdowns. Against the Atlanta Falcons, he set a team record with 8 kickoff returns (196 yards). On October 23, in a win against the Los Angeles Rams, he set the NFL record for most kickoff return yards in a single-game (304) and the most combined kickoff/punt return yards in a game (347). He had 2 kickoff returns for touchdowns that same game which tied another league record and set a club record. He also made his first start at right cornerback in place of an injured Carl Lee and made the first interception of his career. He tied two NFL records for most kickoff returns (63 yards) and kickoff return yards (1,556). He was sixth in the NFC with a 24.7-yard kickoff return average.

In 1995, he played in all 16 games, primarily in the dime defense, posting 18 tackles, 2 interceptions and 5 passes defensed. He finished third in the NFC in kickoff returns (24.5-yard average), eighth in the conference in punt returns (9.4-yard average). His 66 total kickoff returns and 1,617 kickoff return yards, broke the NFL and Saints records of 63 and 1,556 he established the previous season. His 1,879 total kickoff and punt return yards, fell 51 yards short of the NFL's single-season mark of 1,930 held by Brian Mitchell (1994). He tallied 94 combined kickoff and punt returns, which tied him for third-most in league history.

In 1996, he was able to set the NFL record for kickoff return yards in a season (1,791) and combined kickoff and punt return yards in a season (1,943). He led the league in number of kickoff returns and return yards from 1994 to 1996.

Hughes left as the franchise career record holder for kickoff return yards (5,717), punt return yards (1,060) and touchdown returns (5). He also finished with 67 tackles, 4 interceptions and 4 fumble recoveries. In 2015, he was inducted into the New Orleans Saints Hall of Fame.

=== Chicago Bears ===
On April 11, 1997, he signed a lucrative free agent contract with the Chicago Bears. He struggled on special teams and couldn't find a way to contribute on defense or offense, with the Bears trying him also at wide receiver. He was declared inactive for the last two games of the season. He was released on April 24, 1998.

=== Baltimore Ravens ===
On July 30, 1998, he was signed as a free agent by the Baltimore Ravens. He was released on August 25.

=== Dallas Cowboys ===
On December 4, 1998, he was signed as a free agent by the Dallas Cowboys, who had their top returners injured and needed help for their remaining games and playoff push. He posted 11 kickoff returns for 274 yards (24.9 avg.) and 10 punt returns for 93 yards (9.3 avg.). He was not re-signed after the season.

=== Houma Bayou Bucks ===
Hughes would return to professional football in 2003. He played defensive back for the Houma Bayou Bucks of the National Indoor Football League during the 2003 and 2004 seasons. He had a total of 9 interceptions for the Bucks, returning two of them for touchdowns.
