= Tamarick Vanover =

American gridiron football player (born 1974)

No. 80, 87
- Position: Wide receiver

Personal information
- Born: February 25, 1974 (age 52); Tallahassee, Florida, U.S.
- Listed height: 6 ft 0 in (1.83 m)
- Listed weight: 220 lb (100 kg)

Career information
- High school: Leon (Tallahassee)
- College: Florida State
- NFL draft: 1995: 3rd round, 81st overall pick

Career history
- Las Vegas Posse (1994); Kansas City Chiefs (1995–1999); San Diego Chargers (2002)

Awards and highlights
- NFL PFWA All-Rookie Team (1995); National champion (1993); First-team All-American (1992); Second-team All American (1993); Second-team All-ACC (1992); ACC Rookie of the Year (1992)

Career NFL statistics
- Receptions: 39
- Receiving yards: 564
- Receiving touchdowns: 3
- Return touchdowns: 8
- Stats at Pro Football Reference

Tamarick Vanover (born February 25, 1974) is an American former professional football player who was a wide receiver in the National Football League (NFL). He played for the Kansas City Chiefs and the San Diego Chargers of the NFL and the Las Vegas Posse of the Canadian Football League (CFL). During his time in the NFL, he primarily played as a kick and punt returner, returning 8 punts and kickoffs for a touchdown in his career.

== College career ==
Vanover spent two seasons at Florida State University, where he was named a first-team All-American in 1992 as a freshman kick returner. He earned national recognition for his kick returns, returning 13 kickoffs for 523 yards and two touchdowns with a 40.2-yard average. He was named Atlantic Coast Conference Rookie of Year in 1992. Vanover had off-field problems and chose to turn professional after his junior year. He finished his collegiate career with 87 receptions for 1,123 yards in two seasons for Seminoles.

== Professional career ==
=== Las Vegas Posse ===
The Las Vegas Posse, a CFL expansion franchise, signed Vanover as a marquee player in 1994. He played in 15 games, catching 23 passes for 385 yards with three touchdowns. He returned 31 kickoffs for 718 yards with a 90-yard touchdown return and added 36 punt returns for 341 yards with another (105-yard) touchdown return.

=== Kansas City Chiefs ===
When the Posse ceased operations after only a single season, Vanover set his sights on the NFL for 1995, and was selected by the Kansas City Chiefs. He began a 5-year stint with the Chiefs, playing 70 games, where he caught 39 passes for 564 yards, rushed for 88 yards, returned 181 punts for 1930 yards (a 10.2 average) and 4 touchdowns, and returned 226 kickoffs for 5422 yards (a 24.0 average) and 4 touchdowns. On October 9, 1995, in a home Monday Night Football game against the San Diego Chargers, Vanover returned a punt 86 yards for a touchdown, to win the game for the Chiefs, 29-23 in overtime. It was the first time in NFL history that a game had been won, in overtime, on a punt return for a touchdown.

=== San Diego Chargers ===
He was signed by the San Diego Chargers during the 2002 offseason, only playing one season for the team.

== Off-field issues ==
His last season in Kansas City (1999) was successful on the field (as the league leader in punt return yardage and touchdowns), but marred by a range of problems off the field. He pled guilty to a felony charge of aiding and abetting in the sale of a stolen vehicle after agreeing to cooperate with federal authorities in their continuing investigation of drug-trafficking and stolen-vehicle rings. He was in the news again in March when the Chiefs, faced with having to pay Vanover a $750,000 roster bonus, renegotiated his contract. Finally, the Chiefs released him after federal authorities unsealed records showing he helped finance a marijuana trafficking ring that involved former Chiefs running back Bam Morris. He served two months in prison.

Vanover was charged with one count of conspiracy to commit wire fraud and health care fraud, two counts of wire fraud, and two counts of health care fraud by the United States Department of Justice on December 12, 2019. He pleaded not guilty to the charges. He was indicted on the same charges in a superseding case on July 24, 2020. In September 2021, the Department of Justice announced that Vanover had pleaded guilty and would be officially sentenced in January 2022. In January 2022, Vanover was sentenced to 1 year and a day in federal prison.

== After football ==
In 2007, Vanover was the head coach of Lake City Christian Academy's football team. He returned to Florida State as a student, and worked as an assistant with the football team’s wide receivers in 2009.
