= John Turner (American football) =

American football player (born 1956)

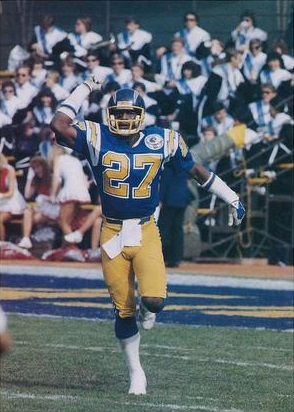
- Turner with the San Diego Chargers in 1984

No. 27
- Position: Cornerback

Personal information
- Born: February 22, 1956 (age 70); Miami, Florida, U.S.
- Listed height: 6 ft 0 in (1.83 m)
- Listed weight: 197 lb (89 kg)

Career information
- High school: Norland (FL)
- College: Miami (FL)
- NFL draft: 1978: 2nd round, 48th overall pick

Career history
- Minnesota Vikings (1978–1983); San Diego Chargers (1984); Minnesota Vikings (1985–1987)

Career NFL statistics
- Interceptions: 24
- Fumble recoveries: 5
- Touchdowns: 1
- Stats at Pro Football Reference

John Turner (born February 22, 1956) is an American former professional football player who was a cornerback in the National Football League (NFL).

Turner played college football for the Miami Hurricanes, starting at cornerback. He played ten seasons in the NFL, nine of those with the Minnesota Vikings. In 1997, Turner was hired to coach the expansion St. Paul Sting, a semi-pro American Football team in the Mid-America Football League (MFL). In the team's first and only season, Turner led the Sting to the MFL Championship Game, played at the Hubert H. Humphrey Metrodome in Minneapolis, Minnesota. The St. Paul Sting fell to the Minneapolis Lumberjacks in that Championship Game. The Lumberjacks were coached by former St. John's University standout Todd Fultz. Turner played high school football at Miami Norland where the school mascot, like his professional years with Minnesota, was the Vikings.

Turner currently works as an administrative assistant at Park Center Senior High School in Brooklyn Park, Minnesota.
