= Fred Zamberletti =

American football trainer (1932–2018)

Fred Zamberletti (May 28, 1932 – September 2, 2018) was an athletic trainer in American football.

Born in Melcher, Iowa, he was the athletic trainer for the Minnesota Vikings of the National Football League. He was the team's first athletic trainer, assuming the job in the Vikings inaugural year of 1961. He was on the sidelines for every preseason, regular season and postseason game in Vikings history until the December 24, 2011, game at Washington against the Redskins. He attended the University of Iowa. Zamberletti was named the Professional Athletic Trainer of the Year in 1986 and in 1996 the Vikings staff was honored as the NFL Athletic Training Staff of the Year. He was inducted into the Vikings Ring of Honor on December 20, 1998.

== Death ==
Zamberletti died September 2, 2018, of spinal osteomyelitis. He was 86.
