= Woodley Lewis =

American football player (1925–2000)

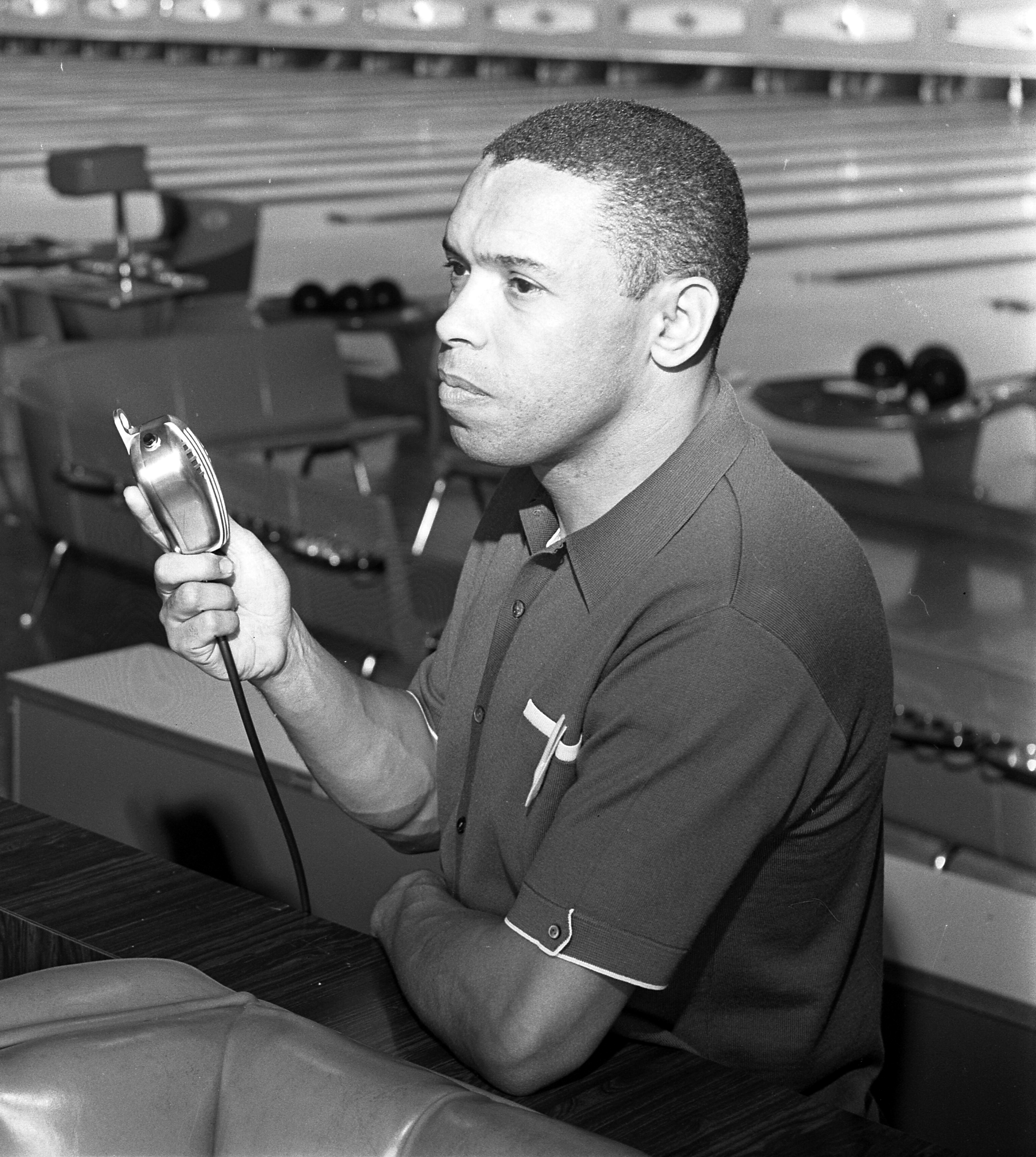
- Lewis in 1961

No. 30, 20, 47, 23
- Positions: Defensive back, wide receiver, running back

Personal information
- Born: June 14, 1925; Los Angeles, California, U.S.
- Died: December 29, 2000 (aged 75); Los Angeles, California, U.S.
- Listed height: 6 ft 0 in (1.83 m)
- Listed weight: 185 lb (84 kg)

Career information
- High school: Manual Arts (Los Angeles)
- College: Oregon (1948–1949)
- NFL draft: 1950: 8th round, 103rd overall pick

Career history
- Los Angeles Rams (1950–1955); Chicago Cardinals (1956–1959); Dallas Cowboys (1960)

Awards and highlights
- NFL champion (1951); 2× All-Pro (1951, 1953); Pro Bowl (1950); 2× NFL kickoff return yards leader (1953, 1954)

Career NFL statistics
- Receptions: 123
- Receiving yards: 1,885
- Return yards: 4,351
- Interceptions: 26
- Total touchdowns: 18
- Stats at Pro Football Reference

Woodley Carl Lewis Jr. (June 14, 1925 – December 29, 2000) was an American professional football player who was an end, wide receiver and defensive back in the National Football League (NFL). He played college football for the Oregon Ducks. Lewis played 11 seasons in the NFL for the Los Angeles Rams, Chicago Cardinals, and Dallas Cowboys.

== Early life ==
Lewis attended Manual Arts High School, before moving on to the Los Angeles City College. After his sophomore year he accepted a scholarship from the University of Oregon.

In 1948, he was a teammate of Norm Van Brocklin and was the starting halfback (he missed 3 games with an injury). Oregon tied with California for the title of the Pacific Coast Conference, forerunner of the Pac-12. California was undefeated overall, and Oregon's only loss was at undefeated Michigan, that year's national champions. Oregon did not go to the Rose Bowl, however, because Cal was voted by the other schools to represent the PCC in the game. They would lose 13-21 in the Cotton Bowl against Southern Methodist University. He also became the first African-American to play in the Cotton Bowl Stadium. In 1949, he led the nation in kickoff returns, ranked seventh in pass interceptions (8) and led his team in rushing with 473 yards (6.8-yard average).

He finished his college eligibility as the school's record-holder in career kickoff return average (34.1 avg.), single-season return average (43.2), career rushing yards per carry (5.6), longest punt return (92 yards against Oregon State, 1949) and longest kickoff return (102 yards against Colorado, 1949).

In 1999, he was inducted into the University of Oregon Athletics Hall of Fame. He was also inducted into the Oregon Sports Hall of Fame.

== Professional career ==
=== Los Angeles Rams ===
Lewis was selected by the Los Angeles Rams in the eighth round (103rd overall) of the 1950 NFL draft, becoming the third African-American ever drafted in the National Football League.

He earned the starting position at right cornerback and registered an interception in his first professional game. As a rookie, he finished the season with a team record 12 interceptions (second in the league) and 275 interception return yards (first in the league). He was the only Rams rookie to ever be named to a Pro Bowl until 1962 (Merlin Olsen). The next year, he played on offense and defense, helping the Rams become NFL champions for the second time in franchise history.

In 1953, he led the league in kickoff return yards with 830 (league record) and punt return yards with 267. Of special significance was his game against the Detroit Lions, when he registered 294 combined return yards (league record), with 120 punt return yards (including a 78-yard touchdown return) and 174 kickoff return yards, in a 31-19 win.

The next year, he led the league again in kickoff return yards with 836, breaking his own league record. In 1955, he was moved to wide receiver.

On September 24, 1956, he was traded to the Chicago Cardinals in exchange for a draft choice. During his time with the Rams, he played as a cornerback, running back, wide receiver and on special teams.

=== Chicago Cardinals ===
In 1956, he played as a defensive back. The next year, he was moved to wide receiver and was third on his team in receiving yards with 424. He also led the league in all purpose yards with 1,281, was second in kickoff return yards with 682 and third in punt return yards with 175.

In 1958, he led the team in receiving, registering 46 receptions (sixth on the league) and 690 receiving yards (sixth on the league).

On September 16, 1960, He was traded to the Dallas Cowboys. He was one of only three players to never miss a game during the decade of the 1950s, the others being Leo Nomellini and Emlen Tunnell.

=== Dallas Cowboys ===
Lewis was a part of the franchise's inaugural season. As the team's elder statesman and a reserve wide receiver, he appeared in 6 games and registered one reception for 19 yards. He was released on November 10.

== Personal life ==
On December 29, 2000, he died of heart and kidney problems.

In 1962, he invested in a 36-lane bowling alley with an adjacent restaurant and cocktail lounge at 1950 North Central Avenue, becoming one of the first African-American business owners in Compton.
