= Roster bonus =

A roster bonus is a feature that may be included in a professional sports player contract.

A roster bonus is conditional, unlike a signing bonus. The latter is received upon the initial signing of the contract and is generally the player's regardless of future events. The roster bonus, however, is paid only if a player is still on the active roster of the team at a specific future date. This feature is mostly used in North America in National Football League contracts. Most NFL roster bonuses have trigger dates of either March 1 or June 1 of a specific future year. If the player is on the team's roster as of that date, the entire amount of the bonus must be paid, even if he is released the next day.

The roster bonus has a very specific effect on a team's "salary cap," the amount of its payroll that counts toward the money permitted by league agreement. Unlike a signing bonus, the amount of a roster bonus is not prorated over the lifetime of a player's contract. Thus, roster bonuses are often used by teams that prefer to front-load the salary cap impact of a contract and lessen the impact on future years. In other cases, large roster bonuses are not truly intended by the parties to be paid, but rather to create a virtual deadline by which a team will either cut the player or renegotiate their contract.
