= Return specialist =

American/Canadian football player who specializes in kick returns

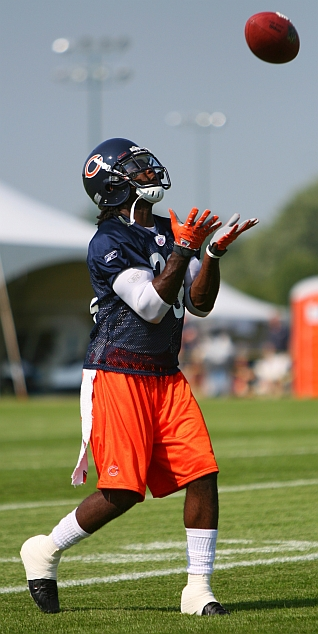
Devin Hester, the first and only return specialist inducted into the Pro Football Hall of Fame, fielding a punt during special teams practice at the Chicago Bears' 2007 training camp

A return specialist, subcategorized as kick or punt returners, is a player on the special teams unit of a gridiron football team who specializes in returning kickoffs and punts. There are few players who are exclusively return specialists; most also play another position such as wide receiver, cornerback, or running back. The special teams counterpart of a return specialist is a kicking specialist.

According to All-American Venric Mark, "Returning punts is harder. You have to judge the ball more, you have to know when to fair catch and when not to. You can't be a superhero and try to catch everything. With kickoff returns, you catch the ball and—boom—you're going."

== Kickoff returner ==
A kickoff returner (KR) is the player on special teams who is primarily responsible for catching the opposing team's kickoff and attempting to run it towards the end zone to score a touchdown. If the ball is kicked into his own end zone, the kick returner must assess the situation on the field while the ball is in the air and determine if it would be beneficial to his team for a return. If he decides that it is not, he can make a touchback by kneeling down in the end zone after catching the ball, ending the play and starting the next play at the 25-yard line to start the drive.

The kickoff returner position is often played by a small, faster player such as a cornerback, running back or wide receiver. Backup players frequently assume this role so starting players on the offense take fewer hits as the kickoff returner position, and can play their regular positions. In the days of one platoon football, the returner position was synonymous with the "safety man"—a quarterback or halfback.

In 2012, NFL commissioner Roger Goodell proposed the idea of removing the kickoff play, and quoted that the "kickoff return is too dangerous for the game". The idea was met with criticism and the idea was eventually dropped. However, rule changes during his tenure have greatly reduced the frequency of NFL kickoff returns. The most significant one was in 2011, when the NFL changed the starting position of the kickoff from the 30 to the 35-yard line, resulting in far more kickoffs going through the end zone or so deep into the end zone that the returner would usually take a touchback. In 2015, another rule change made the touchback give the receiving team the ball on their 25-yard line instead of the 20.

On October 27, 2013, wide receiver Cordarrelle Patterson of the Minnesota Vikings returned the kickoff 109 yards and scored a touchdown, the longest run possible in NFL standards.

=== Notable kickoff returners ===
- In the movie Forrest Gump, Forrest was an All-American kick returner for the Alabama Crimson Tide under Bear Bryant in the mid 1960s.
- Brian Mitchell, who played running back in the NFL for 14 seasons, is the league's career leader in kickoff return yards (14,014) and punt return yards (4,999) by a very wide margin.
- Red Grange was one of the sport's first iconic faces, breaking onto the national scene with a 95-yard kickoff return against Michigan.
- Gale Sayers was an All-Pro running back who also returned punts and kicks for the Chicago Bears. He was inducted into the Hall of Fame in 1977. He currently holds the record for the highest career kickoff return average at 30.56 yards per attempt. Brad Oremland of Sports Central called him the greatest kick returner in NFL history.
- Deion Sanders played cornerback for multiple NFL teams and also played kick returner and punt returner on special teams. Sanders was inducted into the Pro Football Hall of Fame in 2011. Sanders totaled 3,523 kick return yards in his career, including three touchdowns. Sanders held the record for most non-offensive touchdowns, 19 in total, until Devin Hester broke the record in the 2014 season.
- Desmond Howard, MVP of Super Bowl XXXI. Howard is the only player ever to win Super Bowl MVP exclusively due to his special teams performance, setting Super Bowl records for longest kickoff return (99 yards), punt return yards (90), total return yards (244) and combined net yards (244). Incidentally, his 99-yard kickoff return in the game was the only kickoff return touchdown of his entire career.
- Dante Hall played wide receiver and as a kick returner "was the most dangerous player in the NFL for a couple of seasons".
- Devin Hester played wide receiver and as a return specialist holds the record for the most all-time return touchdowns (20) and most all-time punt return touchdowns (14). He is the only primary return specialist to be enshrined in the Pro Football Hall of Fame, and is widely considered to be the greatest return specialist of all time.
- Cordarrelle Patterson has the NFL record for kick return touchdowns with 9.
- Glyn Milburn holds the NFL record for most all-purpose yards in a single game, set while playing for the Denver Broncos (404 yards on December 10, 1995) with John Elway quarterbacking. One of the greatest return specialists of all time, he became the Chicago Bears all-time leading kick returner with 4,596 yards. He had 9,788 NFL career kick returning total yards. He also holds the Denver Broncos' franchise record for the most kick return yards in a single season, with 1,269 in 1995.
- Josh Cribbs holds the NFL record as the only player with two kickoffs of 100 yards or more returned for touchdowns in a single game.
- Gizmo Williams is a Canadian Football Hall of Fame member acclaimed as a game-breaking specialist who played longest in the CFL but also played in the NCAA, USFL, and NFL.

== Punt returner ==
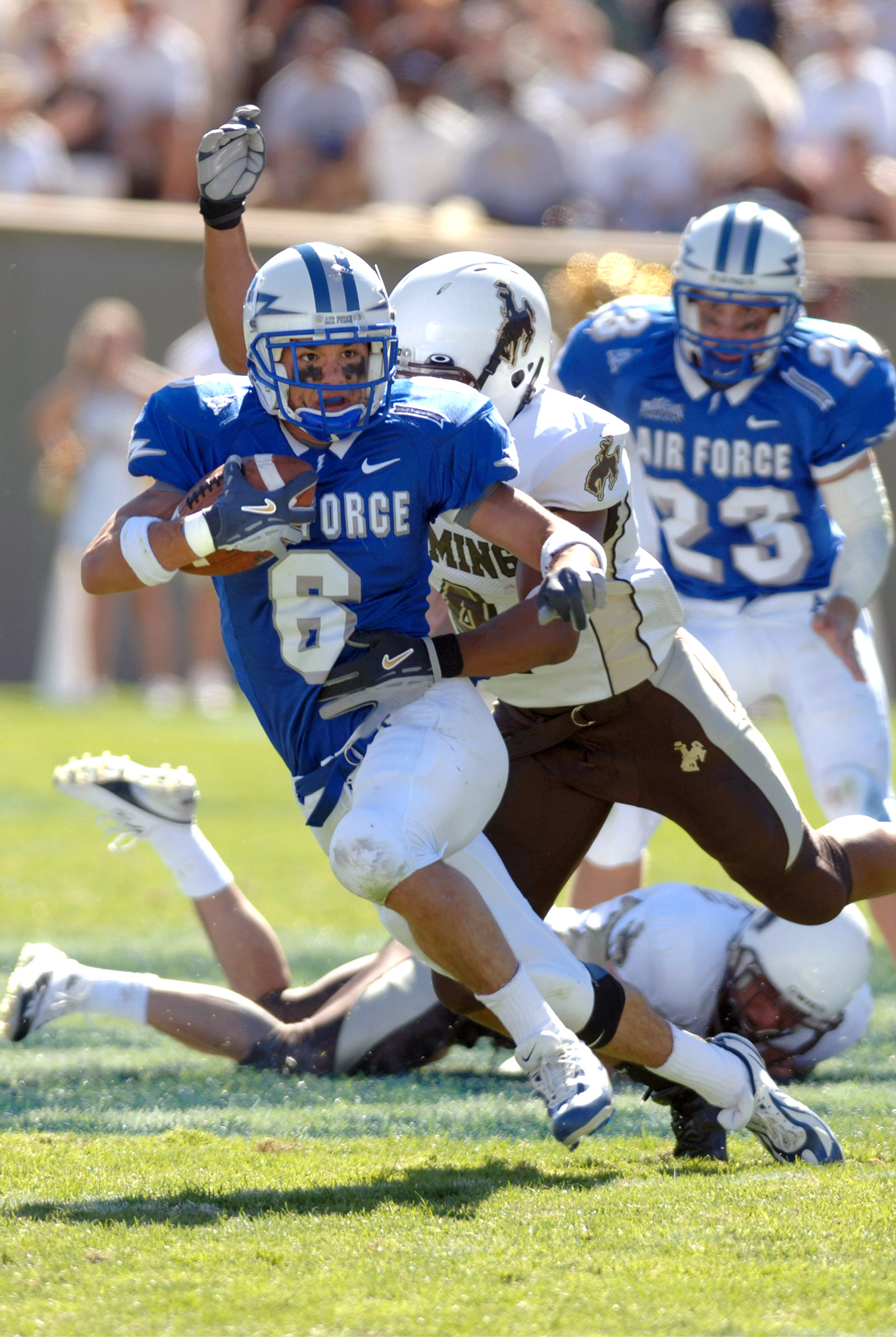
Chris Sutton of Air Force returning a punt in 2003

A punt returner (PR) has the job of catching the ball after it is punted and to give his team good field position (or a touchdown if possible) by returning it. Before catching the punted ball, the returner must assess the situation on the field while the ball is still in the air. He must determine if it is actually beneficial for his team to attempt a return. If it appears that the players from the punting team will be too close to the returner by the time he catches the ball, or it appears the ball will go into his own end zone, the punt returner can elect not to return the ball by choosing one of two options:

- Call for a fair catch by waving one arm above his head before catching the punt. This means that the play will end once the catch is made; the punt returner's team will have the ball at the spot of the catch and no return attempt can be made. The fair catch minimizes the chances of a fumble or injury because it ensures that the returner is fully protected from the opposing team, whose players may not touch the returner or attempt to interfere with the catch in any way after the fair catch signal is given. In the NFL, a fair catch also allows the fair catch kick to be used on the next play, even with no time on the clock remaining, to attempt a field goal via free kick. However, this option is rarely exercised.
- Avoid the ball and let it hit the ground. Under this option the ball will go into the returning team's end zone for a touchback, go out of bounds and be spotted at that point, or come to final rest in the field of play and be downed by a player on the punting team. This is the safest option, as it completely eliminates the chance of a fumble and ensures that the returner's team will get possession of the ball. However, it also provides an opportunity for the punting team to pin the returner's team deep in their own territory by downing the ball or sending it out of bounds near the returner's end zone. This can not only give the return team poor field position, but can even lead to a safety.

Punt returners sometimes also return kickoffs and usually play other positions, especially wide receiver, cornerback and running back, although sometimes as backups. An analogous position exists in Canadian football, though differences in rules affect play considerably. See comparison of Canadian and American football for a complete discussion of the punt returner's role in the Canadian game.

In 2014, Devin Hester broke Deion Sanders' record for most punt return touchdowns, with 14. He currently remains the record holder.

== See also ==
- List of National Football League annual kickoff return yards leaders
- List of National Football League career kickoff return yards leaders
- List of NCAA major college yearly punt and kickoff return leaders
