= Comalander Stadium =

Stadium in San Antonio, Texas, US

Jerry Comalander Stadium
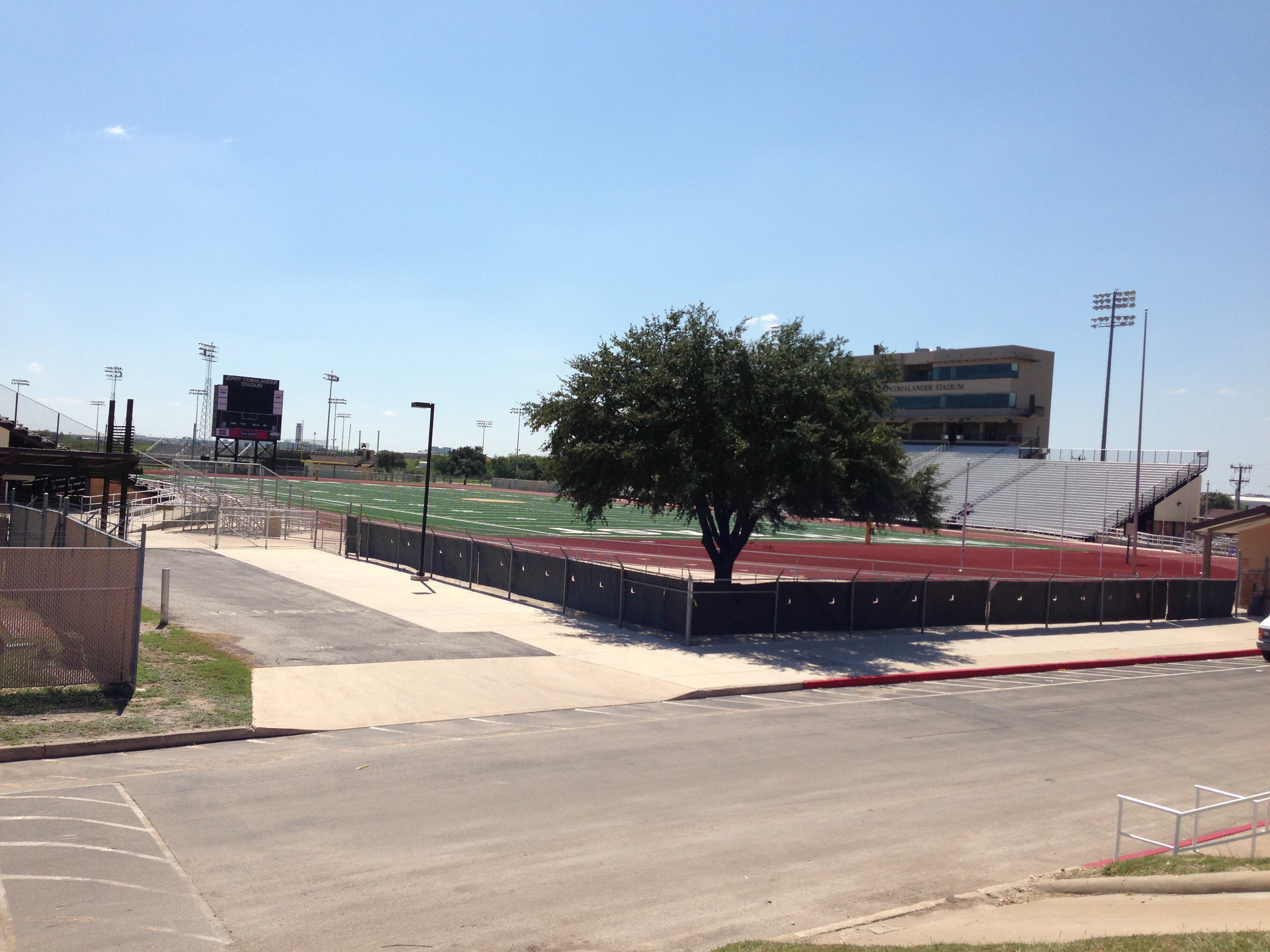
- Interactive map of Jerry Comalander Stadium
- Full name: Jerry Comalander Stadium
- Former names: North East Stadium; Blossom Stadium
- Location: 12002 Jones Maltsberger Rd; San Antonio, Texas 78216
- Coordinates: 29.549623°N 98.467734°W
- Owner: North East ISD
- Operator: North East ISD
- Capacity: 10,952
- Surface: Prestige XT-60

Construction
- Opened: 1962

Tenants
- Churchill High School; Johnson High School; Lee High School; MacArthur High School; Madison High School; Reagan High School; Roosevelt High School

Comalander Stadium is an 11,000-seat, open style football and soccer stadium in San Antonio, Texas. Built as North East Stadium in 1962, it was renamed to Comalander Stadium in 2000, for long time district athletic director and Football Coach Jerry Comalander. As a part of the Blossom Athletic Center, it is owned and operated by the North East Independent School District. Along with Heroes Stadium, the stadium is the home venue for the football, track and field, and band events for the high schools and middle schools in the district. Also, the Crossmen Drum and Bugle Corps host their spring training here annually in May and June. The playing surface was upgraded in 1998.
