= Heroes Stadium =

Football stadium in San Antonio, Texas

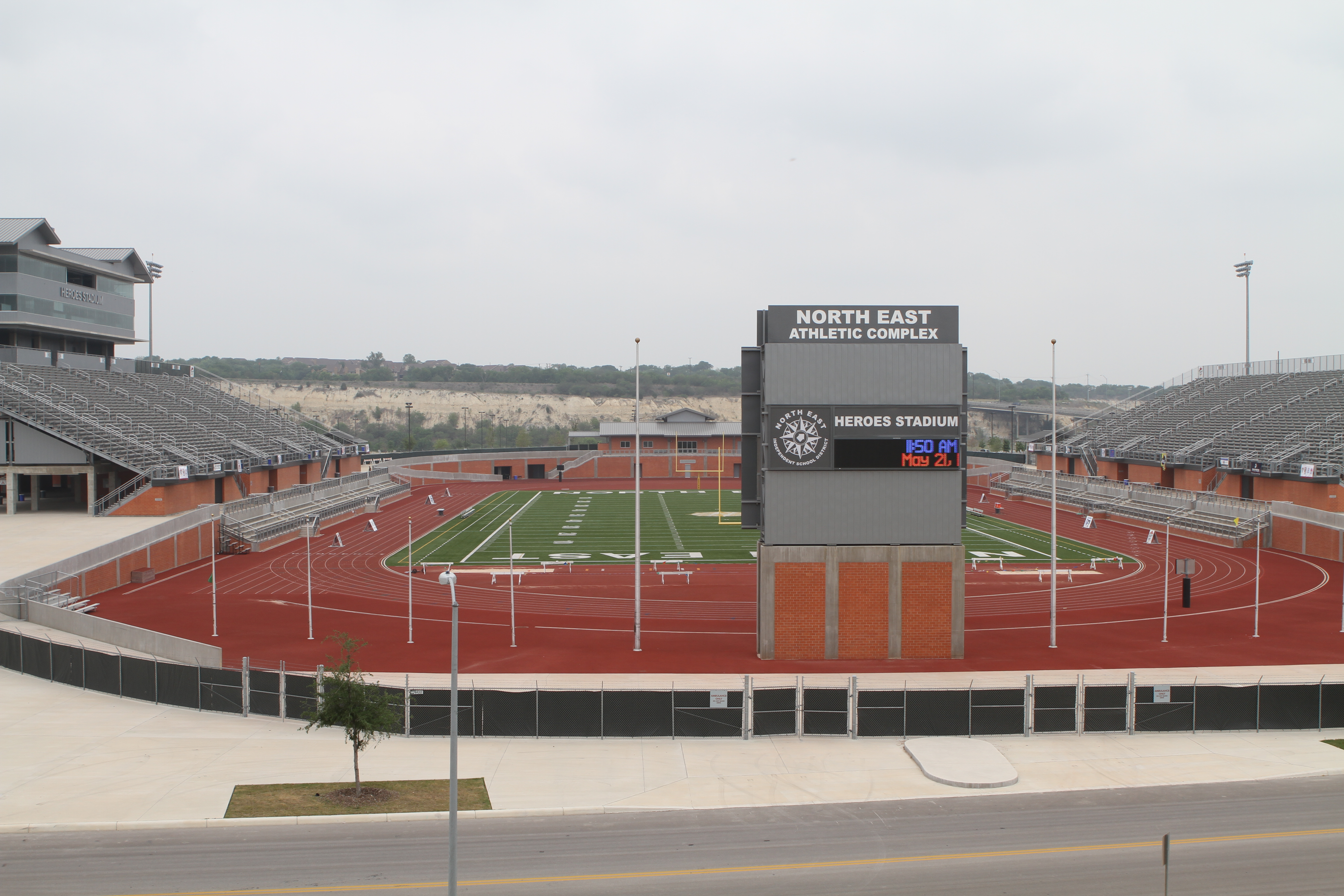
- Interactive map of Heroes Stadium
- Location: 4799 Thousand Oaks Dr; San Antonio, Texas 78233
- Coordinates: 29.5369°N 98.3978°W
- Owner: North East ISD
- Operator: North East ISD
- Capacity: 11,122
- Surface: Fieldturf Duraspine
- Acreage: 58

Construction
- Groundbreaking: December 18, 2007
- Opened: August 28, 2009
- Architects: Rehler Vaughn & Koone, Inc.
- General contractors: Joeris General Contractors, Ltd.

Tenants
- Churchill High School Johnson High School; Lee High School; MacArthur High School; Madison High School; Reagan High School; Roosevelt High School San Antonio Scorpions (2012)

Heroes Stadium is an 11,000-seat, open style football stadium serving the public school district North East ISD in San Antonio, Texas, USA. It opened in 2009, built on the 58-acre (230,000 m^{2}) site of the abandoned Longhorn Quarry, and has 2,525 paved parking spaces. $27.5 million of funding was provided by a 2007 school district bond. A video board system measuring 15 by 25 ft (4.6 by 7.6 m) was installed in 2010. Along with Comalander Stadium, Heroes is the home venue for the football, track and field, soccer, and band events for the high schools in the North East Independent School District, and also plays host to various athletic events for the district's middle and elementary schools.

The stadium received national exposure on August 27, 2010, when it held a game between local Madison Mavericks and Steele Knights of Cibolo. The game was televised by ESPN, as part of its High School Rise Kickoff Event.

The venue hosted the San Antonio Scorpions in their inaugural 2012 NASL season. The team played at the site to an average attendance of 9,176, including a couple of sellout crowds, while their stadium, Toyota Field, was being completed.
