= Design and Technology Academy =

Public/magnet school in San Antonio, Texas, USA

Location
- 5110 Walzem Road; San Antonio, Texas 78218; United States; 29.508037°N 98.389595°W

Information
- Type: Public/Magnet
- Founded: 1999
- School district: North East ISD
- Director: Christie Szabo
- Grades: 9–12
- Campus: Theodore Roosevelt High School
- Colors: Black, White, and Silver
- Website: data.neisd.net

The Design and Technology Academy (DATA), established in 1999, is a public technology based magnet school located on the Theodore Roosevelt High School campus in San Antonio, Texas. It offers technology-oriented curricula including architecture, graphic design, 3D animation, traditional art, digital art, and video production. The school also provides a college preparation program utilizing elective pathways and college-level courses.

== History ==
DATA was founded in 1999 and is connected with the Ed White Middle School and Theodore Roosevelt High School in the North East Independent School District.

The middle school program opened at the beginning of the 2015-2016 school year with an initial class of 142 sixth-grade students. At that time, the program was available for students from sixth to eighth grades. After completing eighth grade, students would continue in an accelerated program at Roosevelt High School.

As of 2023, 457 students are enrolled at DATA.

== See also ==
- Engineering & Technologies Academy
- Theodore Roosevelt High School
- STEM Academy at LEE
- International School of the Americas
