= North East Independent School District =

School district in Texas

Coordinates: 29°31′18″N 98°27′25″W

Location
- 8961 Tesoro Drive; San Antonio, TX 78217 Bexar County, Texas United States

District information
- Type: Public school district
- Grades: PK-12
- Established: 1950
- Superintendent: Mr. Anthony Jarrett
- Accreditations: Texas Education Agency; United States Department of Education
- Schools: 7 high schools 14 middle schools 46 elementary schools
- Budget: ▲$579,522,200
- NCES District ID: 4832940

Students and staff
- Students: 60,483
- Teachers: 4,115
- Staff: 8,433

Other information
- 2017 Accountability Rating: Met Standard
- Website: neisd.net

The North East Independent School District (commonly NEISD or North East ISD) is a school district located in San Antonio, Texas, United States. North East ISD serves the north-central and northeast areas of Bexar County, covering about 132 square miles (340 km^{2}). North East ISD serves the cities of Castle Hills, Hill Country Village, Hollywood Park, and Windcrest, and portions of San Antonio, Balcones Heights, Terrell Hills, and Timberwood Park. North East ISD is the second-largest school district serving the San Antonio area by student attendance, following Northside ISD.

== Schools ==
The district's seven main high school campuses were named after nationally or internationally renowned persons until 2018, when Robert E. Lee High School was renamed Legacy of Educational Excellence High School (L.E.E. High School).

High schools (grades 9-12)
School	Established	Mascot	Colors	Additional information
Winston Churchill High School	1966	Chargers	Black & Red	
Lady Bird Johnson High School	2008	Jaguars	Columbia Blue, Navy, & Silver	
Legacy of Educational Excellence High School	1958	Volunteers	Red & Gray	Originally Robert E. Lee High School (1958–2018)
Douglas MacArthur High School	1951	Brahmas	Blue & White	Originally North East High School (1951-1958)
Madison High School	1976	Mavericks	Burnt Orange & Navy	
Reagan High School	1999	Rattlers	Green, Black, & Silver	
Roosevelt High School	1966	Rough Riders	Nevy & Red	

North East offers seven magnet programs housed at four main campuses, and an additional program at the Perrin Central complex. Each of these programs operates with various levels of autonomy and integration with its primary campus.

Magnet programs
Program	Campus
Agriscience Magnet Program (AMP)	Madison High School
Career & Technical Education Center (CTEC)	Perrin Central
Design and Technology Academy (DATA)	Roosevelt High School
Institute of CyberSecurity & Innonvation (iCSI)	Located in a former Walmart adjacent to MacArthur High School
International School of the Americas (ISA)	LEE High School
North East School of the Arts (NESA)	LEE High School
STEM Academy	LEE High School
Space and Engineering & Technologies Academy (SETA)	Roosevelt High School

All of the district's middle schools are named after Texas-renowned persons.

Middle schools (grades 6-8)
School	Established	Mascot	Colors	Additional information
Omar N. Bradley Middle School	1982	Bears	Green & White	National Blue Ribbon School in 1986–87
Barbara Bush Middle School	1998	Bulldogs	Cardinal & Gold	
Dwight D. Eisenhower Middle School	1962	Generals	Red & White	
John Nance Garner Middle School	1961	Yearlings	Blue & White	
Bernard A. Harris Jr. Middle School	2006	Hawks	Purple & Gold	
Tex Hill Middle School	2014	Tigers	Royal Blue, Cardinal Red, & Columbia Blue	
Will W. Jackson Middle School	1970	Jaguars	Orange & Black	
Walter Krueger Middle School	1962	Falcons	Black & Gold	Interactive Media Applications at Krueger; Krueger School of Applied Technologies; Space & Engineering Technologies Academy; Rencon
Jose M. Lopez Middle School	2007	Panthers	Blue & Gold	
Chester Nimitz Middle School	1961	Seahawks	Blue & Gold	
Frank Tejeda Middle School	2001	Timberwolves	Midnight Blue & Silver	
Ed White Middle School	1970	Eagles	Ultramarine Blue & Gold	Design and Technology Academy
John H. Wood Jr. Middle School	1980	Wranglers	Burnt Orange & White	

The district's elementary schools are named in coordination with the neighborhood or community name.

Elementary schools (grades PK-5)
School	Established	Mascot	Colors	Additional information
Bulverde Creek Elementary	2005			
Camelot Elementary	1969			
Castle Hills Elementary	1951			
Canyon Ridge Elementary	2005			
Cibolo Green Elementary	2010			
Coker Elementary	1954			
Colonial Hills Elementary	1961			
Dellview Elementary	1957			
East Terrell Hills Elementary	1962			
El Dorado Elementary	1973			
Encino Park Elementary	1989			
Fox Run Elementary	1990			
Hardy Oak Elementary	2000			
Harmony Hills Elementary	1963			
Hidden Forest Elementary	1978			National Blue Ribbon School in 2000–01 and 2007-08
Huebner Elementary	1997			
Jackson-Keller Elementary	1962			
Larkspur Elementary	1966			
Las Lomas Elementary	2012			
Longs Creek Elementary	1997			
Montgomery Elementary	1974			
Northern Hills Elementary	1981			
Northwood Elementary	1957			
Oak Grove Elementary	1961			
Oak Meadow Elementary	1991			
Olmos Elementary	1956			National Blue Ribbon School in 2000–01
Pre-K Academy at West Avenue	1964			Originally West Avenue Elementary until 2019
Redland Oaks Elementary	1989			
Regency Place Elementary	1968			
Ridgeview Elementary	1956			
Roan Forest Elementary	2002			National Blue Ribbon School in 2008-09
Royal Ridge Elementary	2002			
Serna Elementary	1953			
Stahl Elementary	1979			
Steubing Ranch Elementary	2005			
Stone Oak Elementary	1996			
Thousand Oaks Elementary	1979			
Tuscany Heights Elementary	2010			
Vineyard Ranch Elementary	2012			
Walzem Elementary	1960			
Wetmore Elementary	2001			
Wilderness Oak Elementary	2005			
Windcrest Elementary	1963			
Woodstone Elementary	1978			

Alternative schools
School	Established
Academy of Creative Education (ACE)	1991
MacArthur United	
North East Alternative Center	

Former Schools
School	Established	Closed
Clara Driscoll Middle School	1992	2025

== Student information ==
=== Demographics ===
Demographics	2021	2017	2015	2014
African-American	7.35%	7.33%	7.0%	7%
Asian	3.9%	3.82%	3.0%	4%
Hispanic	60.54%	58.89%	57%	58%
Native American	0.25%	0.24%	0%	1%
Pacific Islander	0.12%	0.17%	0%	0%
Two or more races	3.90%	3.32%	3%	3%
White, non-Hispanic	23.93%	26.23%	27%	28%

=== Students by grade ===
Grade	2021	2017	2015	2014
Early education		365	251	260
Pre-K – 5	26,088	30,397	31,242	31,538
6–8	15,135	15,053	15,337	15,544
9–12	20,260	21,716	21,141	20,864
Total	60,483	67,531	67,971	68,206

== Athletic facilities ==
In addition to on-campus facilities, the district owns and operates a number of sports venues. Among these are two 11,000-seat football stadiums, Heroes Stadium and Comalander Stadium, the Josh Davis Natatorium, and baseball, soccer, and tennis facilities at the Blossom Athletic Center. The district signed a 50-year rent-free lease to operate Time Warner Cable Park on Wetmore Road from the City of San Antonio in 2015.

== Shanley v. North East ISD ==
North East ISD was the defendant in Shanley v. Northeast Independent School District, a Fifth Circuit Court of Appeals ruling which declared that North East ISD had an overly broad policy and the district's suspension of five students had interfered with their rights to free speech under the United States Constitution. North East had suspended five high school students for publishing an unapproved newsletter and then distributed it to students near campus before and after school hours. The NEISD school board declared the content, which included information about birth control and advocated for the review of marijuana laws, to be inappropriate and controversial. The Court found that public schools can limit the expression of its students when it materially and substantially interferes with school activities, or with the rights of teachers and other students, but not at non-school-sponsored events, and the district cannot exceed its authority to forbid or punish on-campus activity when punishing off-campus activity.

It should come as a shock to the parents of five high school seniors that their elected school board had assumed [control] over their children before and after school, off school grounds, and with regard to their children's rights [of] expressing their thoughts ... We trust that it will come as no shock to the school board that their assumption of authority is an unconstitutional usurption [sic] of the First Amendment.

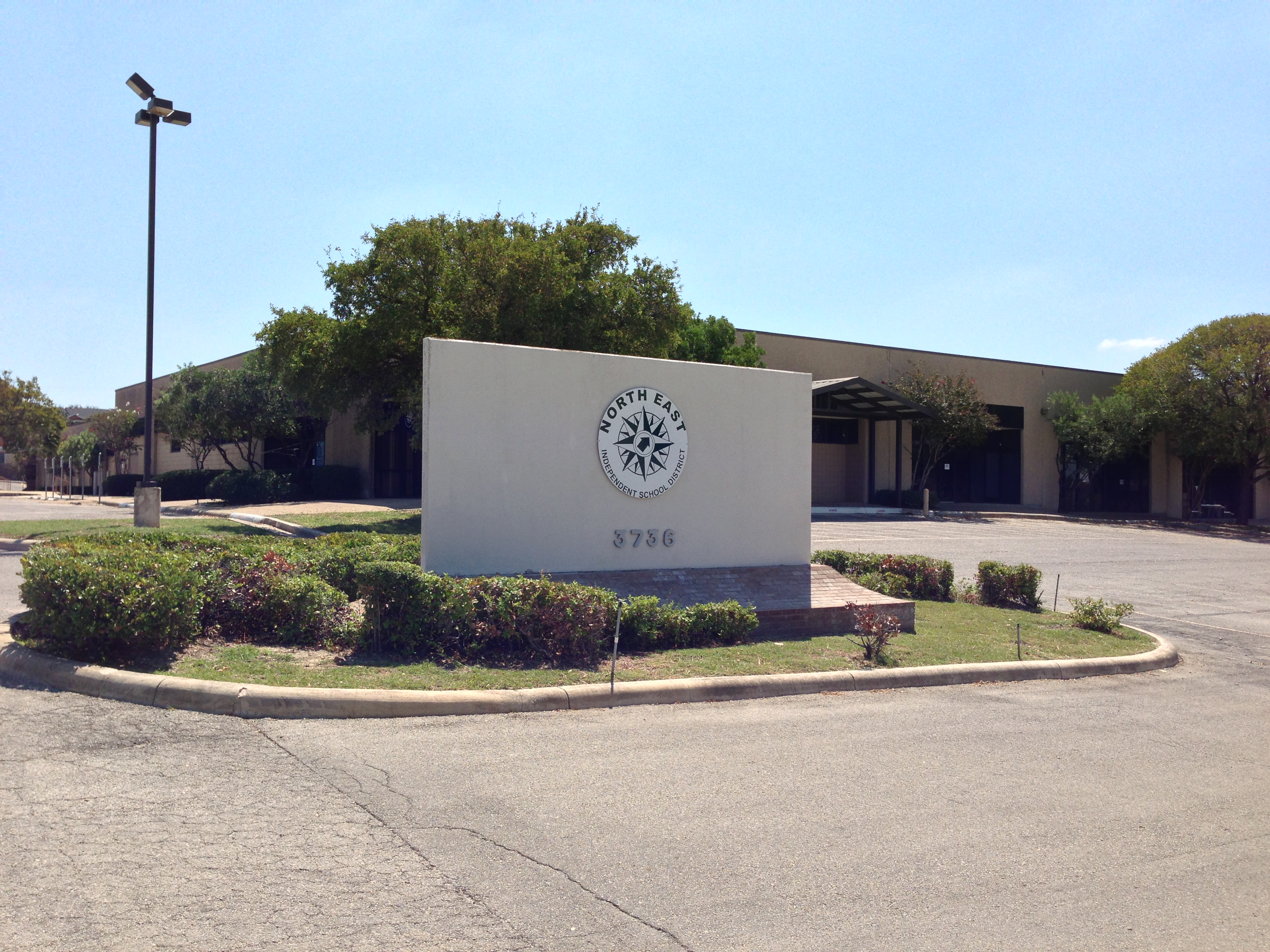
A North East administrative facility located in the same complex as the Academy of Creative Education bears the district logo.

== See also ==
- List of school districts in Texas
