= Engineering & Technologies Academy =

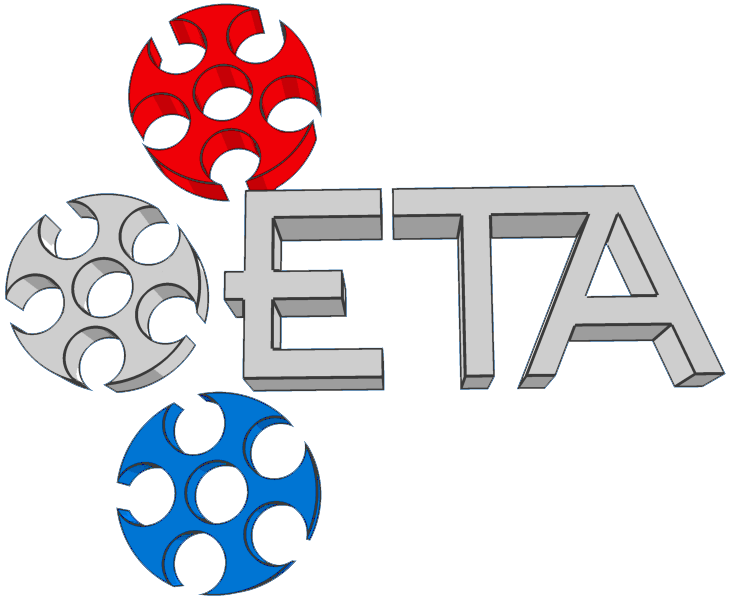

Location
- 5110 Walzem Road; San Antonio, Texas 78218; United States; 29.508037°N 98.389595°W

Information
- Type: Public/Magnet
- Founded: 2004
- Founders: William "Bill" Sturgis and Richard Howe
- Closed: 2026
- School district: North East ISD
- Director: Denise Ruiz
- Grades: 9–12
- Colors: Maroon and White
- Website: seta.neisd.net

The Engineering & Technologies Academy (ETA) was a public engineering-based magnet high school located at Theodore Roosevelt High School, in San Antonio, Texas. The Engineering and Technologies Academy had various engineering and science related curriculum such as manufacturing, communication graphics, principles of engineering, drafting and computer-Aided design, GIS, and information technologies. Students also had the ability to partake in off-campus internships related to various fields of engineering.

ETA was founded in 2004 by former director William Sturgis and former UTSA professor Richard Howe. ETA enrolled 97 freshman for 2009–2010. The majority of students at ETA participated in competitions in organizations such as FIRST, the Technology Student Association, and the University Interscholastic League. Some of the program's students were employed as interns at businesses such as Southwest Research Institute, Rackspace, and Zachry Construction Corporation.

As of 2023, with the creation of the Space & Engineering Technologies Academy at Roosevelt High School, the Engineering & Technologies Academy was phased out in favor of the new program, with the final ETA senior class graduating in 2026.

== See also ==
- Krueger Middle School
- Design and Technology Academy
- Theodore Roosevelt High School
- STEM Academy at LEE
