= Richard Osborne (American football) =

American football player (1953–2025)

No. 88, 86, 87
- Position: Tight end

Personal information
- Born: October 31, 1953; Wichita, Kansas, U.S.
- Died: February 26, 2025 (aged 71); Bexar County, Texas, U.S.
- Listed height: 6 ft 3 in (1.91 m)
- Listed weight: 230 lb (104 kg)

Career information
- High school: Robert E. Lee (San Antonio, Texas)
- College: Texas A&M
- NFL draft: 1976: 9th round, 248th overall pick

Career history
- Philadelphia Eagles (1976); New York Jets (1976); Philadelphia Eagles (1977–1978); St. Louis Cardinals (1979)

Awards and highlights
- Second-team All-SWC (1975)

Career NFL statistics
- Receptions: 23
- Receiving yards: 197
- Receiving TDs: 1
- Stats at Pro Football Reference

Richard Arlen Osborne (October 31, 1953 – February 26, 2025) was an American professional football player who was a tight end for four seasons in the National Football League (NFL). He played college football for the Texas A&M Aggies. Osborne was selected by the Philadelphia Eagles in the ninth round of the 1976 NFL draft, but was waived during the 1976 season. He was claimed off waivers by the New York Jets, and was traded back to Philadelphia the following year in exchange for a future draft pick. He played for the Eagles from 1976 to 1978, the Jets in 1976, and the St. Louis Cardinals in 1979.

Osborne played his high school football at Robert E. Lee High School in San Antonio where he earned all-state honors as a wide receiver. He helped lead the Lee Volunteers to a 28-27 1971 UIL 4A State title over Wichita Falls high school. Tommy Kramer who had a long NFL career was his quarterback in high school. Another notable teammate in high school was Pat Rockett who also earned all-state honors and later played Major League Baseball for the Atlanta Braves.

Osborne died on February 26, 2025, at the age of 71.
