= Shanley v. Northeast Independent School District =

Shanley v. Northeast
- Court: United States Court of Appeals for the Fifth Circuit
- Full case name: Mark Stephen Shanley, by Next Friend, et al., v. Northeast Independent School District, Bexar County, Texas, etc., et al.
- Decided: June 9 1972
- Citation: 462 F.2d 960

Case history
- Prior history: Plaintiffs sought injunctive relief from school's sanctions, District Court found case "wholly without merit" and dismissed on own motion
- Subsequent history: expedited appeal

Holding
- Unreasonable restrictions imposed by public schools on student expression is an unconstitutional infringement of the First Amendment; District Court reversed by 5th Circuit Appeals Court

Court membership
- Judges sitting: John Minor Wisdom, Irving Loeb Goldberg, Charles Clark

Case opinions
- Majority: Goldberg
- Concurrence: Clark

Laws applied
- First Amendment, Fourteenth Amendment

Shanley v. Northeast Independent School District was a United States Federal Appeals Court decision issued in 1972 that outlined the limited power and reach of a public school system to apply administrative sanctions against the speech or written expression of its students when produced and/or distributed off school grounds and outside school hours. The case involved the suspension of five high school seniors in the North East Independent School District of San Antonio, Texas. The students were accused of publishing an unapproved newsletter called The Awakening and disseminating it to students on a street nearby to the school grounds. The newsletter contained a statements advocating a review of marijuana laws, providing information about birth control, and other topics the school judged to be inappropriate and controversial. The principal suspended the five students for violating a school board policy which read,

...any attempt to avoid the school's established procedure for administrative approval of activities such as the production for distribution and/or distribution of petitions or printed documents of any kind, sort, or type without the specific approval of the principal shall be cause for suspension and, if in the judgment of the principal, there is justification, for referral to the office of the Superintendent with a recommendation for expulsion...

The students each ranked as "good" or "excellent" students, and the suspensions resulted in a substantial drop in their school scores, having a potentially significant impact on their college admissions. The North East Independent school board upheld the suspensions, and the parents of the students then sought both temporary and permanent injunctive relief in the federal courts. A Texas district court denied all relief and dismissed the plaintiffs' case on its own motion, judging the case to be "wholly without merit". The district court also refused the plaintiff's request for injunction until an appeal could be heard. The Fifth Circuit Court of Appeals expedited the appeal and itself issued an injunction against the school to preserve the students' academic records while the appeal went forward.

Following arguments from all parties, the Appeals Court found the North East school district's speech policy failed to set any limits with regard to time, place, or content of expression that required students to seek prior approval from the school. The Court also found the school district failed to outline any administrative course of action enabling students to appeal when charged with violating the broadly applied policy. Schools can limit the expression of its students when it materially and substantially interferes with school activities, or with the rights of teachers and other students, the Court wrote in its decision. But schools cannot restrict such expression on the sole basis that some school officials, students or parents object to the content.

Taking note of the almost unprecedented latitude granted by the policy to school officials to regulate students' out-of-school behavior, the Court weighed several factors to judge whether the policy established reasonable or unreasonable limits on student expression.

It is clear...that the authority of the school board to balance school discipline against the First Amendment by forbidding or punishing off-campus activity cannot exceed its authority to forbid or punish on-campus activity. Therefore, we must first examine the authority of the school board to order the actions of students on school grounds and within school hours.

Quoting from another case relating to policies regulating student speech while at school, Burnside v. Byars, the Court went on to say

In formulating regulations, including those pertaining to the discipline of school children, school officials have a wide latitude of discretion. But the school is always bound by the requirement that the rules and regulations must be reasonable. It is not for us to consider whether such rules are wise or expedient but merely whether they are a reasonable exercise of the power and discretion of the school authorities . . . . [W]e must also emphasize that school officials cannot ignore expressions of feelings with which they do not wish to contend. They cannot infringe on their students' right to free and unrestricted expression as guaranteed to them under the First Amendment to the Constitution, where the exercise of such rights in the school buildings and schoolrooms do not materially and substantially interfere with the requirements of appropriate discipline in the operation of the school.

While schools can establish policies restraining student expression which are reasonable and which are intended to prevent disruptions within their schools, the Court wrote, the "burden of demonstrating reasonableness becomes geometrically heavier as its decision begins to focus upon the content of materials that are not obscene, libelous, or inflammatory".

The Fifth Circuit Appeals Court reversed the lower court, finding for the Plaintiff that the North East Independent School District policy was overly broad, and the district's suspension of those five students had interfered with their rights to free speech as guaranteed under the First and the Fourteenth Amendments to the United States Constitution.
