= Vincent Taylor (American football) =

American football player (born 1994)

No. 96
- Position: Defensive tackle

Personal information
- Born: January 5, 1994 (age 32); New Orleans, Louisiana, U.S.
- Listed height: 6 ft 3 in (1.91 m)
- Listed weight: 311 lb (141 kg)

Career information
- High school: James Madison (San Antonio, Texas)
- College: Oklahoma State (2013–2016)
- NFL draft: 2017: 6th round, 194th overall pick

Career history
- Miami Dolphins (2017–2018); Buffalo Bills (2019); Cleveland Browns (2020); Houston Texans (2021); Atlanta Falcons (2022)

Awards and highlights
- First-team All-Big 12 (2016)

Career NFL statistics
- Total tackles: 65
- Sacks: 2.0
- Fumble recoveries: 1
- Pass deflections: 2
- Stats at Pro Football Reference

Vincent Taylor (born January 5, 1994) is an American former professional football player who was a defensive tackle in the National Football League (NFL). He played college football for the Oklahoma State Cowboys. Taylor played professionally for the Miami Dolphins, Buffalo Bills, Cleveland Browns, and Houston Texans. He was also a member of the Atlanta Falcons but spent the season on injured reserve.

== Early life ==
Taylor was born in New Orleans, Louisiana, and moved to San Antonio, Texas, after his family's home was destroyed in Hurricane Katrina. He attended James Madison High School in San Antonio. As a senior, he recorded 79 tackles and two sacks. Taylor committed to Oklahoma State University to play college football.

== College career ==
After redshirting his first year at Oklahoma State in 2013, Taylor appeared in 10 games as a redshirt freshman in 2014, recording 13 tackles. As a sophomore in 2015, he started all 13 games and had 48 tackles and five sacks. As a junior, he had 51 tackles and seven sacks and was named first-team All-Big 12 Conference. After the season, Taylor decided to forgo his senior year and enter the 2017 NFL draft.

== Professional career ==
Pre-draft measurables
Height	Weight	Arm length	Hand span	40-yard dash	10-yard split	20-yard split	20-yard shuttle	Three-cone drill	Vertical jump	Broad jump	Bench press
6 ft 2 5/8 in (1.90 m)	304 lb (138 kg)	34 3/8 in (0.87 m)	10 1/8 in (0.26 m)	5.07 s	1.77 s	2.95 s	4.72 s	7.58 s	28.5 in (0.72 m)	9 ft 0 in (2.74 m)	26 reps
All values from NFL Combine

=== Miami Dolphins ===
Taylor was selected by the Miami Dolphins in the sixth round, 194th overall, in the 2017 NFL Draft. He played in 13 games as a rookie before being placed on injured reserve on December 28, 2017 with a knee injury.

In 2018, Taylor played in eight games before suffering a foot injury in Week 8. He was placed on injured reserve on October 30, 2018.

On September 2, 2019, Taylor was waived by the Dolphins.

=== Buffalo Bills ===
On September 5, 2019, Taylor was signed to the practice squad of the Buffalo Bills. He was promoted to the active roster on November 2, 2019.

Taylor was placed on the reserve/COVID-19 list by the Bills on July 29, 2020, and activated from the list six days later. He was waived as part of final roster cuts on September 5, 2020.

=== Cleveland Browns ===
Taylor was claimed off waivers by the Cleveland Browns on September 6, 2020.

=== Houston Texans ===
Taylor signed a one-year contract with the Houston Texans on March 22, 2021. He suffered an ankle injury in Week 1 and was placed on injured reserve on September 15, 2021.

=== Atlanta Falcons ===
On April 19, 2022, Taylor signed with the Atlanta Falcons. He suffered a ruptured Achilles during training camp practice and was placed on season-ending injured reserve on August 7, 2022.
