= Academy of Creative Education =

Coordinates: 29.538350°N 98.420062°W

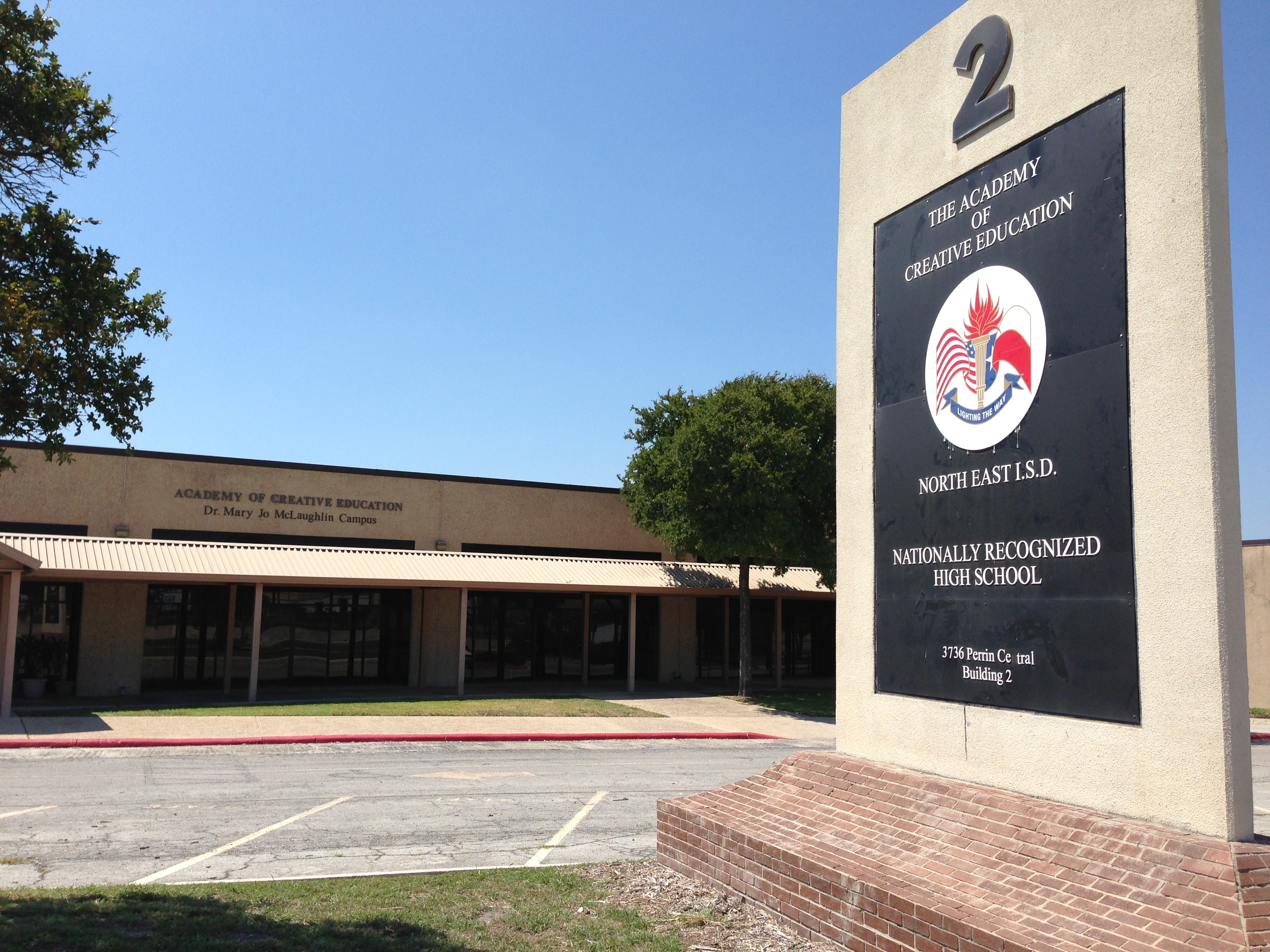

Location
- 17150 Jones Maltsberger Road; San Antonio, Texas 78247; United States

Information
- School type: Public, High School
- Motto: Lighting The Way
- Founded: September 16, 1991
- School district: North East ISD
- Principal: Dr. Patrick J. Valdez
- Age range: 16-21
- Language: English
- Website: http://www.neisd.net/ace

The Academy of Creative Education (ACE) is a non-traditional, non-punitive high school for students at risk of dropping out in the North East Independent School District in San Antonio, Texas. ACE was established in 1991 to offer classes for at-risk youth between 16–21 years old, and its staff is composed of educators and community representatives. For the 2024-2025 school year, the school received a rating of "A" from the Texas Education Agency.

ACE provides a different environment to at-risk students in which to learn, where the instructors use innovative teaching models and teaching strategies. This creative approach aims to improve student achievement when the traditional high school model has failed them.

== History ==
ACE first opened their doors on September 16, 1991 as a product of collaboration between NEISD and a Texas Education Agency grant. Between this partnership, ACE was designed as a learning environment that gives students multiple pathways to gain and demonstrate knowledge.

Since opening, ACE has accumulated multiple state, national, and international recognitions, including the 2003 Crystal Star Award from the National Dropout Prevention Network and the Reaching At-Promise Students Association’s Best Practice Award. Their former principal, Dr. Mary Jo McLaughlin, was honored as a Top Finalist for Time Warner Cable’s National Champion Principal Award. ACE is currently led by Principal Dr. Patrick J. Valdez.
