= Keith O'Quinn =

American football coach

Dallas Cowboys
- Title: Advance scouting coordinator

Personal information
- Born: Pensacola, FL

Career information
- High school: San Antonio (TX) James Madison
- College: North Texas; Hardin–Simmons

Career history
- Liberty Christian School Defensive backs & wide receivers coach (1998); Bryan Adams HS Run game coordinator & offensive line coach (1999); Hardin–Simmons Assistant offensive line & tight ends coach (2000–2003); Abilene Christian Tight ends & special teams coach (2003–2004); Kaufman HS Assistant head coach (2005); Dallas Cowboys Pro scout (2006–2008); Cleveland Browns Director of pro personnel (2009); Dallas Cowboys (2010–2019); Offensive quality control coach (2010–2012); Assistant wide receivers coach (2013); Assistant special teams (2014–2017); Special teams coordinator (2018–2019); Advance scouting coordinator (2020–present)

Keith O'Quinn is an American football coach. He is the former special teams coordinator for the Dallas Cowboys of the National Football League (NFL).

== Early life ==
O’Quinn was born in Pensacola, FL. He played the strong safety position on the football team at the University of North Texas, playing under Jeff Ireland in 1992 and 1993. O'Quinn earned a bachelor's of science degree at the University of North Texas and went on to earn a master's degree in counseling and human development from Hardin-Simmons University.

== Coaching career ==
=== Dallas Cowboys ===
In 2010, O'Quinn was hired by the Dallas Cowboys as an offensive quality control coach, a position he would serve for four seasons. In 2014, he was promoted to the assistant special teams coach. In 2018, O'Quinn was promoted to special teams coordinator.

== Personal life ==
O’Quinn and his wife, Reigan, have three children, Mysti, Brittney and Brock.
