= Hollywood Park, Texas =

- Town
- Location of Hollywood Park, Texas
- Coordinates: 29°35′57″N 98°29′7″W
- Country: United States
- State: Texas
- County: Bexar

Area
  - Total: 1.45 sq mi (3.75 km^{2})
  - Land: 1.45 sq mi (3.75 km^{2})
  - Water: 0.0039 sq mi (0.01 km^{2})
- Elevation: 961 ft (293 m)

Population (2020)
  - Total: 3,130
  - Density: 2,311.3/sq mi (892.38/km^{2})
- Time zone: UTC-6 (Central (CST))
  - Summer (DST): UTC-5 (CDT)
- ZIP code: 78232
- Area codes: 210, 726 (planned)
- FIPS code: 48-34628
- GNIS feature ID: 1337969
- ANSI Code: 2412765
- Website: http://www.hollywoodpark-tx.gov/

Hollywood Park is a town in Bexar County, Texas, United States. The population was 3,130 at the 2020 census. It is an enclave within far north central Bexar County and is part of the San Antonio Metropolitan Statistical Area.

== Geography ==
Hollywood Park is located approximately 15 miles north of downtown San Antonio.

According to the United States Census Bureau, the town has a total area of 1.5 square miles (3.9 km^{2}), all land.

== Demographics ==
Historical population
Census	Pop.	Note	%±
1960	783		—
1970	2,299		193.6%
1980	3,231		40.5%
1990	2,841		−12.1%
2000	2,983		5.0%
2010	3,062		2.6%
2020	3,130		2.2%
U.S. Decennial Census

=== 2020 census ===
As of the 2020 census, there were 3,130 people and 954 families residing in the town. The median age was 50.2 years. 19.3% of residents were under the age of 18 and 26.8% of residents were 65 years of age or older. For every 100 females there were 95.3 males, and for every 100 females age 18 and over there were 93.4 males age 18 and over.

There were 1,261 households in Hollywood Park, of which 30.0% had children under the age of 18 living in them. Of all households, 68.1% were married-couple households, 10.9% were households with a male householder and no spouse or partner present, and 18.3% were households with a female householder and no spouse or partner present. About 20.2% of all households were made up of individuals and 13.2% had someone living alone who was 65 years of age or older. There were 1,368 housing units, of which 7.8% were vacant. The homeowner vacancy rate was 1.4% and the rental vacancy rate was 31.8%.

100.0% of residents lived in urban areas, while 0.0% lived in rural areas.

Hollywood Park racial composition as of 2020 (NH = Non-Hispanic) (Note: Note: the US Census treats Hispanic/Latino as an ethnic category. This table excludes Latinos from the racial categories and assigns them to a separate category. Hispanics/Latinos can be of any race.)
Race	Number	Percentage
White (NH)	2,247	71.79%
Black or African American (NH)	24	0.77%
Native American or Alaska Native (NH)	7	0.22%
Asian (NH)	34	1.09%
Pacific Islander (NH)	1	0.03%
Some Other Race (NH)	15	0.48%
Mixed/Multi-Racial (NH)	105	3.35%
Hispanic or Latino	697	22.27%
Total	3,130	

=== 2000 census ===
As of the census of 2000, there were 2,983 people, 1,174 households, and 906 families residing in the town. The population density was 2,027.3 inhabitants per square mile (782.7/km^{2}). There were 1,222 housing units at an average density of 830.5 per square mile (320.7/km^{2}). The racial makeup of the town was 95.64% White, 0.27% African American, 0.27% Native American, 0.94% Asian, 0.13% Pacific Islander, 1.11% from other races, and 1.64% from two or more races. Hispanic or Latino of any race were 10.06% of the population.

There were 1,174 households, out of which 25.8% had children under the age of 18 living with them, 69.6% were married couples living together, 5.7% had a female householder with no husband present, and 22.8% were non-families. 21.0% of all households were made up of individuals, and 16.4% had someone living alone who was 65 years of age or older. The average household size was 2.49 and the average family size was 2.87.

In the town, the population was spread out, with 20.7% under the age of 18, 3.4% from 18 to 24, 21.0% from 25 to 44, 27.3% from 45 to 64, and 27.7% who were 65 years of age or older. The median age was 49 years. For every 100 females, there were 88.7 males. For every 100 females age 18 and over, there were 86.0 males.

The median income for a household in the town was $64,844, and the median income for a family was $81,702. Males had a median income of $52,344 versus $40,781 for females. The per capita income for the town was $34,138. None of the families and 2.7% of the population were living below the poverty line, including no under eighteens and 5.7% of those over 64.

== Education ==
Hollywood Park is within the North East Independent School District.

Zoned schools are as follows: Hidden Forest Elementary School, Bradley Middle School, and Churchill High School in San Antonio.

== History ==
The Town of Hollywood Park was officially incorporated on December 7, 1955, after residents were concerned about losing the neighborhood's autonomy to San Antonio. The community has a distinctly rural feel and residents often build homes they intend to live in for the rest of their lives. Many of the community's leaders of today are the children and grandchildren of some of the original residents.

The Police Department was established in 1955 soon after the town was incorporated. When the town was formed, water hoses had to stay connected at each residence and ready to use in case of a fire. In 1958, a group of men joined and a couple of volunteers attended the Firefighters School at Texas A&M University, and the Hollywood Park Volunteer Fire Department was founded.

In addition to the homes originally built in Hollywood Park, two additional sections were added later to include The Gardens of Hollywood Park and The Enclave of Hollywood Park.

== List of mayors ==
- Clifford Mann – Elected 1955, first mayor of Hollywood Park
- Alfred E. Schweppe – Mayor from 1959 to 1964
- Yates Field – Mayor from 1964 to 1968
- Dixon O. Brown – Mayor from 1968 to 1970
- Felix Forshage – Mayor from 1970 to 1976
- Yuell C. Chandler – Mayor from 1976 to 1977
- Ruby W. Weinholt – Mayor from 1977 to 1986, former president and CEO of St. Joseph's Credit Union, 2001 inductee into the Texas Credit Union Hall of Fame
- Steven R. Silvia – Mayor in 1986
- Patricia Flynn – Mayor from 1986 to 1988
- Bala K. Srinivas – Mayor from 1988 to 1994
- Ralph S. Hoggatt – Mayor from 1994 to 1996
- Roy D. Lemons – Mayor from 1996 to 1998
- Gary Mercer – Mayor from 1998 to 2000, won as a write-in candidate
- Harold Burris – Mayor from 2000 to July 2003, resigned
- Sean P. Martinez – Mayor from July 2003 to June 2005, appointed when Burris resigned, re-elected in 2004, resigned
- Richard W. McIlveen – Mayor from June 2005 to 2010, appointed when Martinez resigned, re-elected to two terms
- Bob Sartor – Mayor from 2010 to 2012
- William "Bill" Bohlke – Elected in May 2012; Bohlke was killed on his ranch in late August 2012 in an apparent attack by a male donkey.
- Mark Perry – Mayor from August 2012 to May 2013; Son-in-law of William "Bill" Bohlke and was appointed after his death.
- David Ortega – Mayor from 2013 to 2014; Completion of William "Bill" Bohlke's unexpired term.
- Chris Fails – Mayor from 2014 to 2018
- Chris Murphy – Mayor from 2018 to 2021; Resigned mayoral position due to federal contract work that precludes employees from holding public office.
- Oscar Villarreal - 2021–2022; Appointed from Place 3 on HP City Council- will serve remainder of Murphy's term until May 2022.
- Sean Moore - former city council member, current mayor May 2022 – present.
