= David Edwards (motivational speaker) =

American football player (1987–2008)

- Born: March 1, 1987; Austin, Texas, U.S.
- Died: February 27, 2008 (aged 20); San Antonio, Texas, U.S.
- Occupation: Motivational speaker

David Edwards (March 1, 1987 – February 27, 2008) was an American high school football player, whose paralysis following an injury during play, led to work as a motivational speaker.

== Biography ==
David Edwards was born on March 1, 1987, in Austin, Texas. As a young child, he showed little interest in sports, but he was the son of a former All-City running back from Austin's Reagan High School and a cousin of former University of Texas running back Shon Mitchell.

=== Accident ===
When David was ten, his family moved to San Antonio, Texas. At the encouragement of a new friend he began playing football at the Pop Warner level. After his junior season of varsity high school football in 2003, David was selected as a Unanimous First-Team All Area Class 5A defensive back by The San Antonio Express-News. That season would be his first and only season playing varsity football for San Antonio's James Madison High School. During the final minutes of the first round play-off game in Austin against Westlake High School, he collided face down with the crown of his helmet to the chest of Westlake receiver Coy Aune. The impact of the collision shattered David's C-4 and C-5 neck vertebrae, leaving him paralyzed from the shoulders down. Over 9,000 people were on hand to witness the devastating accident.

His injury profoundly affected many who were in the stadium. One attendee was filmmaker Peter Berg, who had followed Westlake's season as part of his own research on Texas high school football, prior to filming the movie version of Friday Night Lights. Seeking a way to help Edwards, Berg eventually came up with the idea of having a benefit concert for him and other young men in similar circumstances. That concert took place in April 2004 in Austin. The concert was produced by Friday Night Lights cast member and country music star Tim McGraw. McGraw and his wife Faith Hill headlined the concert along with Friday Night Lights star and musician Billy Bob Thornton and his friend, rock legend Alice Cooper. The concert raised $28,000, to be divided evenly between the David Edwards Trust and the Gridiron Heroes Spinal Cord Injury Organization.

=== Post-accident life ===
Edwards' injury and rehabilitation also inspired Berg to create the character Jason Street (played by Scott Porter), in the TV-series Friday Night Lights, which premiered on NBC in fall 2006.

The Austin Westlake community would go on to raise over $100,000 for David in a fairly short period of time, through their athletic booster program. The moneys collected were to be used to help offset insurance deductibles and pay for other necessities that are not covered by insurance and social security. Two years later, Edwards' $1 million health insurance policy through his stepfather's work had completely been exhausted, and the school district's $5 million catastrophic policy took over with one catch: that policy had a one-time $20,000 deductible. Again, the Westlake community came to David's aid and raised another $20,000 within two weeks.

In 2004, KB Homes built and donated a new single-story home custom designed for Edwards' needs in the same neighborhood where his parents had purchased a new two-story home just a year before his injury. The home was built within about one month, and most of the labor was provided by Edwards' Madison teammates and friends.

Following his injury, Edwards became an inspiration to many including young children in elementary schools whom he spoke to about facing life's challenges with a positive attitude. He also mentored youths who faced similar physical challenges and befriended those who faced terminal disease.

Edwards also became an active participant in the Gridiron Heroes Spinal Cord Injury Foundation. He became very close friends with Chris Canales, the co-founder of the website, who like Edwards was an all-district defensive back who had suffered a spinal cord injury, in Canales' case while making a tackle playing for San Marcos Baptist Academy in 2001. The two were frequently seen together on the field at numerous high school and college football games, continuing to support the sport that brought about their disabilities. Edwards frequently joined Canales and his father Eddie Canales at fundraising events throughout the state of Texas.

=== Death ===
Edwards died of pneumonia related complications at the age of 20 on February 27, 2008, at Northeast Methodist Hospital in San Antonio, Texas.

Edwards’ accident was featured in an episode of the HBO documentary series State of Play in 2014.
