= Hill Country Village, Texas =

- City
- Location of Hill Country Village, Texas
- Coordinates: 29°34′54″N 98°29′9″W
- Country: United States
- State: Texas
- County: Bexar
- Incorporated: 1956

Area
  - Total: 2.20 sq mi (5.70 km^{2})
  - Land: 2.19 sq mi (5.68 km^{2})
  - Water: 0.0077 sq mi (0.02 km^{2})
- Elevation: 945 ft (288 m)

Population (2020)
  - Total: 942
  - Density: 430/sq mi (166/km^{2})
- Time zone: UTC-6 (Central (CST))
  - Summer (DST): UTC-5 (CDT)
- ZIP code: 78232
- Area codes: 210, 726
- FIPS code: 48-33968
- GNIS feature ID: 1337777
- Website: hcv.org

Hill Country Village is a city in Bexar County, Texas, United States. The population was 942 at the 2020 census. It is a very affluent enclave city, home to old money families. It is part of the San Antonio Metropolitan Statistical Area. It is the 7th wealthiest location in Texas by per capita income.

== Geography ==
Hill Country Village is located at 29°34′54″N 98°29′9″W (29.581627, –98.485820). This is approximately 10 miles (16 km) north of Downtown San Antonio.

According to the United States Census Bureau, the city has a total area of 2.2 square miles (5.7 km^{2}), all land.

== Demographics ==
Historical population
Census	Pop.	Note	%±
1960	418		—
1970	636		52.2%
1980	972		52.8%
1990	1,038		6.8%
2000	1,028		−1.0%
2010	985		−4.2%
2020	942		−4.4%
U.S. Decennial Census

=== 2020 census ===
As of the 2020 census, Hill Country Village had a population of 942. The median age was 53.2 years. 18.4% of residents were under the age of 18 and 29.6% of residents were 65 years of age or older. For every 100 females there were 100.0 males, and for every 100 females age 18 and over there were 100.8 males age 18 and over.

100.0% of residents lived in urban areas, while 0.0% lived in rural areas.

There were 337 households in Hill Country Village, of which 30.0% had children under the age of 18 living in them. Of all households, 74.5% were married-couple households, 11.0% were households with a male householder and no spouse or partner present, and 12.5% were households with a female householder and no spouse or partner present. About 12.1% of all households were made up of individuals and 7.4% had someone living alone who was 65 years of age or older.

There were 366 housing units, of which 7.9% were vacant. The homeowner vacancy rate was 1.8% and the rental vacancy rate was 0.0%.

Racial composition as of the 2020 census
Race	Number	Percent
White	751	79.7%
Black or African American	9	1.0%
American Indian and Alaska Native	6	0.6%
Asian	21	2.2%
Native Hawaiian and Other Pacific Islander	0	0.0%
Some other race	28	3.0%
Two or more races	127	13.5%
Hispanic or Latino (of any race)	185	19.6%

=== 2000 census ===
At the 2000 census there were 1,028 people in 340 households, including 294 families, in the city. The population density was 471.5 inhabitants per square mile (182.0/km^{2}). There were 349 housing units at an average density of 160.1 per square mile (61.8/km^{2}). The racial makeup of the city was 94.36% White, 1.07% African American, 0.58% Native American, 1.17% Asian, 1.36% from other races, and 1.46% from two or more races. Hispanic or Latino of any race were 15.86%.

Of the 340 households 39.7% had children under the age of 18 living with them, 79.1% were married couples living together, 4.7% had a female householder with no husband present, and 13.5% were non-families. 11.5% of households were one person and 5.3% were one person aged 65 or older. The average household size was 3.02 and the average family size was 3.27.

The age distribution was 28.2% under the age of 18, 5.0% from 18 to 24, 17.6% from 25 to 44, 36.6% from 45 to 64, and 12.6% 65 or older. The median age was 45 years. For every 100 females, there were 100.0 males. For every 100 females age 18 and over, there were 96.3 males.

The median household income was $130,897 and the median family income was $147,176. Males had a median income of $100,000 versus $40,750 for females. The per capita income for the city was $77,374. About 3.2% of families and 5.1% of the population were below the poverty line, including 9.0% of those under age 18 and 1.4% of those age 65 or over.

== Politics ==
Whilst local elections in Hill Country Village are nonpartisan (as required by Texas law), the electorate favors Republican candidates in partisan elections. Hill Country Village has voted for the GOP in the last five presidential elections.

Hill Country Village city vote by party in presidential elections
Year	Democratic	Republican	Third Parties
2020	32.15% 226	65.72% 462	2.13% 15
2016	22.41% 147	69.97% 459	7.62% 50
2012	21.12% 139	75.53% 497	3.34% 22
2008	16.33% 49	81.67% 245	2.00% 6
2004	19.34% 64	78.25% 259	2.42% 8

== Education ==
The city is served by North East Independent School District.

Zoned schools are as follows: Hidden Forest Elementary School, Bradley Middle School, and Churchill High School in San Antonio.

The San Antonio Public Library System serves Hill Country Village.
