= Fabian Kling =

German footballer (born 1987)

Personal information
- Date of birth: 24 July 1987 (age 39)
- Place of birth: Augsburg, West Germany
- Height: 1.92 m (6 ft 4 in)
- Positions: Defender; midfielder

Youth career
- 2003–2005: FC Augsburg
- 2006–2008: TSV Rain/Lech
- 2008–2011: Fort Lewis Skyhawks

Senior career*
Years	Team	Apps	(Gls)
2008–2011	TSV Rain/Lech	10	(0)
2012	San Antonio Scorpions	15	(0)
2013–2014	FV Illertissen	25	(0)
2013–2014	→ TSV Rain/Lech (loan)	12	(0)
2015	Fort Lauderdale Strikers	14	(0)
Total		76	(0)
- * Club domestic league appearances and goals

Fabian Kling (born 24 July 1987) is a German former professional footballer who played as a defender or midfielder.

== Career ==
=== College and amateur ===
Kling played his college soccer at Fort Lewis College, where he amassed 86 appearances and scored 28 goals. During his time at Fort Lewis, Kling earned honors such as NSCAA Division II National Player of the Year, Defensive Most Outstanding Player of the NCAA Division II Final Four, All-NCAA Division II Final Four Team, NSCAA/Continental Tire All-America first team, Daktronics All-America first team and NSCAA All-Central Region first team in 2011, Fort Lewis Most Valuable Player, Third team NSCAA/Performance Subaru All-America, Third team Daktronics All-America, First team NSCAA/Performance Subaru All-Central Region in 2010, All-NCAA Division II Final Four Team, First team NSCAA All-Central Region, Second team Daktronics All-Central Region in 2009 and First team All-RMAC in 2008.

Kling also spent time with German club TSV Rain/Lech during his summer breaks from college, who play in the Bayernliga.

=== Professional ===
Kling was drafted in the second round of the 2012 MLS Supplemental Draft (30th overall) by Chivas USA, but wasn't signed by the club. He also trialled with The Championship club Reading in February 2012.

Kling signed with expansion side San Antonio Scorpions of the North American Soccer League on 16 March 2012. He made his professional debut with the club on 8 April 2012 in a 0–0 draw against Atlanta Silverbacks.
