= Will W. Jackson =

Texas educator and academic administrator

Will Woodward Jackson (April 20, 1890 – October 14, 1975), known as W. W. Jackson, was an American educator and academic administrator based in San Antonio, Texas. Spanning a five-decade career, he served as president of Westmoreland College and the University of San Antonio, guided their merger into Trinity University, chaired the Texas State Board of Education, and was the founding chairman of San Antonio's public-television station KLRN.

== Early life and education ==
Jackson was born on April 20, 1890, in Waynesboro, Tennessee, and raised in McCauley, Texas. He attended a one-room rural, primary school and entered Southwestern University in 1913 on an Epworth League scholarship and $75 earned from cotton picking. He received his B.A. in 1916 and later pursued graduate work at Georgetown University, the University of Texas at Austin, and Yale University.

Following his graduation from Southwestern University, Jackson began his career in public education, first teaching English and history during a summer term near Georgetown, Texas. He was then offered the principalship of Georgetown High School but instead accepted the position of superintendent at the Normangee School District, a small East Texas school system. His early experience in these rural public schools gave him a lifelong appreciation for teachers working in small communities and inspired his later efforts to strengthen public education across Texas.

During World War I, Jackson was commissioned a Second Lieutenant of Field Artillery in the Officers' Reserve Corps of the United States Army on November 27, 1918.

On August 20, 1919, he married Ruth Lillian Goddard of Nashville, Tennessee, daughter of Rev. and Mrs. Oscar Elmo Goddard, in a ceremony performed by her father at the family residence.

== Academic career ==
Jackson began his career teaching English and history before becoming president of the Methodist-sponsored Wesleyan Institute in San Antonio in 1921, a school serving Spanish-speaking boys and young men. He led the institute until 1930, when it merged into Westmoreland College.

From 1930 to 1936 he served as president of Westmoreland College, and from 1936 to 1942 as president of the University of San Antonio, where he worked toward accreditation and a permanent endowment. A 1942 yearbook identified him as the university's fifth president and credited him with realizing its goal of becoming an endowed, A-grade Protestant institution.

Following the 1942 merger of the University of San Antonio with Trinity University, Jackson became Trinity's vice president and director of public relations during its first San Antonio year. Later after retiring from the university, he served as vice president and senior vice president of the American Hospital and Life Insurance Company before retiring permanently.

== Public service and civic leadership ==
Jackson was deeply involved in civic and educational leadership throughout Texas. He served on the Texas State Board of Education for twenty years (1949–1969), including a decade as chair (1959–1969). The Board commended his work in advancing junior-college education, educational television, occupational training, and teacher preparation.

An active Rotarian, Jackson served as president of the San Antonio Rotary Club and later as district governor of Rotary International. He chaired both the local and state Heart Associations, was executive director of the San Antonio Heart Association, and helped found and chair the board of KLRN, the first public television station in central Texas reachng viewers in both Austin and San Antonio.

He was also a charter member of Jefferson United Methodist Church and served on the boards of St. Mary's University and Southern Methodist University's development board. A 1973 biographical essay by historian David Grover noted that Jackson's career combined "faith, courage, and humor in the service of Texas education."

== Honors and recognition ==
In March 1975, Southwestern University honored Dr. and Mrs. Jackson by establishing the Will W. Jackson Professorship in Education, endowed by colleagues and friends to recognize their five decades of service to Texas education. Among his other honors were the Algernon Sydney Sullivan Award (1960) and the Distinguished Alumnus Award (1965), both from Southwestern University.

== Legacy ==
Jackson died in San Antonio on October 14, 1975, at age 85. A *San Antonio Light* editorial called him "one of those remarkable men who gave so much of his life to the educational achievement of our state," noting that his leadership in KLRN-TV and the State Board of Education left a lasting mark on Texas schools.

In 1970, the San Antonio Independent School District named Jackson Middle School in his honor, and his contributions continue to be recognized through the Will W. Jackson Professorship in Education at Southwestern University.
