= International School of the Americas =

Location
- 1400 Jackson-Keller Road; San Antonio, Texas 78213; United States; 29°30′23″N 98°30′56″W

Information
- School type: Public, magnet high school
- Founded: 1994; 32 years ago
- School district: North East ISD
- Principal: Steve Magadance
- Teaching staff: 44.85 (FTE) (2022–23)
- Grades: 9–12
- Enrollment: 485 (2022–23)
- Student to teacher ratio: 10.81 (2022–23)
- Language: English
- Campus: Suburban
- Colors: Kelly Green and Royal Blue
- Mascot: Globie
- Website: isa.neisd.net

The International School of the Americas (ISA) is a magnet school for grades 9–12 in the North East Independent School District in San Antonio, Texas in Bexar County. It is located on the Lee High School campus at 1400 Jackson-Keller Road. Admission is by lottery. The school is notable for its intentionally small student body and for its Model United Nations conference, named Model United Nations San Antonio (MUNSA), which is the largest such student-run conference in the nation.

== Origins ==
ISA's basic premises stem from a concept paper written by Dr. Thomas J. Sergiovanni, a professor of public education at Trinity University. Its founding was prompted by the creation of the North American Free Trade Agreement, which, economically connecting the United States with Mexico and Canada, and raised the issue of international relations. Originally envisioned as a professional-development school for Trinity University, ISA began as a magnet program before becoming a full-fledged school. ISA maintained strong ties with Trinity University. Students majoring in education may complete internships at ISA as teachers; many ISA teachers are former Trinity students, and many major school events, most notably the annual ceremony for graduating seniors, are held at Trinity.

== Activities ==
With a student body size just under 500, ISA does not have enough students to host its own sports teams, although it does host smaller clubs such as Guitar and Musicians Club, Poetry Club, Diversity Club, LGBT Club, Ultimate Frisbee Club, Model United Nations Club, Acts of Random Kindness Club (ARK Club), Junior States of America (JSA), Interact Service Club (affiliated with Rotary International), Mu Alpha Theta Math Honor Society, National Honor Society (NHS), and the Spanish Honor Society (SHS). Instead, students participate in extracurricular activities on the home campus of Lee High School, fostering a bond between the two schools. A large part of ISA culture is the participation in Model United Nations, which became a school-wide event each year with the hosting of Model United Nations San Antonio, a national conference with over 1,000 delegates from Texas and Mexico, held at Trinity University in early January.

Each grade participates in an annual trip to different states all over the country. The freshmen travel to Houston, Texas, to learn about the environment. The sophomores travel to New Mexico to learn about assimilation and acculturation. The juniors travel to Alabama to learn about the history of civil rights. The seniors travel to Washington D.C. to learn about government policies. ISA also has long-term relationships with schools in other countries and regularly does exchanges with students in South Korea, China, Germany, and Japan.

== Recognition ==
ISA is a member of many educational and international organizations including the Coalition of Essential Schools and the Asia Society. It is, in addition, a member of the Texas High School Project's T-STEM network, and has been awarded "Exemplar" status by it. ISA has also been noticed and lauded by such organizations as the Goldman Sachs Foundation. In 2012 ISA was listed as the Number 2 High School in San Antonio by Children at Risk.
