= Lady Bird Johnson High School =

Claudia Taylor "Lady Bird" Johnson High School

Location
- 23203 Bulverde Road; San Antonio, Bexar County, Texas 78259; United States; 29.657837°N 98.435079°W

Information
- School type: Public, high school
- Motto: Non esse pares, sed praestare (English: Not to equal, but to excel)
- Founded: 2008
- Locale: City: Large
- School district: North East ISD
- NCES School ID: 483294011973
- Principal: Candace Pearson
- Staff: 178.34 (FTE)
- Grades: 9–12
- Enrollment: 3,202 (2022–2023)
- Student to teacher ratio: 17.95
- Language: English
- Colors: Columbia blue, navy and silver
- Athletics conference: UIL Class AAAAAA
- Mascot: Jaguar
- Feeder schools: Tejeda Middle School; Tex Hill Middle School
- Rival schools: Reagan High School; Churchill High School
- Athletic conferences: 27–6A
- Website: Official website

Claudia Taylor "Lady Bird" Johnson High School is a public high school in San Antonio, Texas named after U.S. First Lady Lady Bird Johnson. It is part of the North East Independent School District and classified as a 6A school by the University Interscholastic League. During 2022–2023, Johnson High School had an enrollment of 3,202 students and a student to teacher ratio of 17.45. The school received an overall rating of "B" from the Texas Education Agency for the 2024–2025 school year.

== Facts ==
The school is located in on Bulverde road and TPC Parkway, and serves Stone Oak, Encino Park, Bulverde Creek, Cibolo Canyon, Fox Grove, and other neighborhoods of Far North Central San Antonio. It also serves a portion of Timberwood Park.

Claudia Taylor "Lady Bird" Johnson High School opened on August 28, 2008, for its inaugural year to address the growth and expansion in the north eastern communities of San Antonio, Texas.

The school sits on top of one of the tallest hills in Bexar County and overlooks some of San Antonio. The school mascot is the Jaguar and the school flower is the Bluebonnet (plant). In 2008 during the first year, the community planted bluebonnets and wildflowers around the campus.

The school's song is based on the hymn "Jerusalem", which was Lady Bird's favorite hymn.

The graduation rate is 95%

== Demographics ==
Racial composition	2019-2020
Hispanic	45.1%
White	33.3%
Asian	9%
Black	5.7%
Two or more races	6%
American Indian/Alaskan Native	0.3%
Hawaiian Native/Pacific Islander	0.2%

US News determined Johnson had an enrollment of 3,202 in the 2022 and 2023 school year. According to the school's website, its current enrollment is 3,167. It has an ethnic and racial makeup of 45.1% Hispanic, 33.3% White, 9% Asian, 5.7% Black, 6% Two or More Races, 0.3% American Indian/Alaskan Native, and 0.2% Hawaiian Native/Pacific Islander, totaling to a 66.3% minority enrollment rate. The biological sex distribution is 51% female and 49% male.

The economically disadvantaged rates are far below that of the district (49.5%) and the state (60.2%) sitting at 19.1%. The reduced priced lunch makes up 4% of the populus and 11% was free lunch program.

7.7% of the enrolled students are special education and 3.5% are English learners.

== Band ==
As of 2022, the band has had a total of 73 TMEA All-State band members and these members have taken up a total of 109 chairs of the All-State band in the years since the school was opened. In 2019 the wind ensemble went to Chicago to perform for the Midwest Band Clinic.

=== Marching Band ===
The Johnson High School band is most well known for their marching band because they are a consistent Bands of America competition finalist as well as the 2020 UIL 6A State Marching Band Champions. The band has made four Bands of America Grand National championship finals appearances, and won a total of eight regional championships. They have also made appearances at ten UIL State Competitions in 2010, 2012, 2014, 2018, 2020, 2021, 2022, 2023, 2024 and 2025. On top of their successes in UIL competitions and BOA competitions, they were invited to perform at the 2014 Tournament of Roses Parade.

== Notable alumni ==
- Austin Mahone (2014), Pop music singer
- Deja Kelly (2020 - transferred), basketball player for the Oregon Ducks
- Recee Fox (2014, homeschooled), former basketball player and wife of Spurs' player De’Aaron Fox
- Johnny Keefer (2015-2019), former Korn Ferry Tour Player and current PGA Tour Player
