= Ronald Reagan High School (San Antonio) =

Location
- 19000 Ronald Reagan Drive; San Antonio, Texas 78258; United States; 29.619188°N 98.487979°W

Information
- School type: Public, high school
- Motto: Learning for Life, Learning for Leadership
- Founded: 1999
- School district: North East ISD
- NCES School ID: 483294008116
- Principal: Dr. Charles Reininger, Jr.
- Staff: 180.83 (FTE)
- Grades: 9–12
- Enrollment: 3,403 (2024-2025)
- Student to teacher ratio: 18.82
- Language: English
- Campus: Suburban
- Colors: Emerald green, silver and black
- Athletics conference: UIL Class AAAAA
- Mascot: Rattler
- Feeder schools: Bush Middle School; Lopez Middle School
- Sports District: 28-6A
- Website: Official Website

Ronald Reagan High School is a public high school located in the North East Independent School District in San Antonio, Texas, United States, and named after U.S. President Ronald Reagan. The school serves a portion of Timberwood Park and Stone Oak. For the 2024-2025 school year, the school was given an "A" by the Texas Education Agency.

In the 2026 US News & World Report rankings, Reagan High School was the highest-ranked comprehensive public high school in greater San Antonio.

== History ==
San Antonio, like many Sun Belt cities, experienced explosive growth in its suburbs beginning in the early 1990s. This growth was particularly evident in affluent areas formed by people moving to the city. In Stone Oak and Sonterra north of Route 1604 and between the Blanco Road and US-281 corridors, this rapid growth caused severe overcrowding at nearby Winston Churchill High School. At the time, Churchill was the farthest-north school in the North East Independent School District, and its student population grew to 3,400 at a school designed for not more than 2,500. The district recognized this problem, and included an allocation to build a new high school in the area as a part of its 1997 bond issue. The property for the school was purchased from descendants of rancher William Classen prior to passage of the bond issue.

After voters approved the bond issue, construction began on the 84-acre (340,000 m^{2}) campus. Spaw Glass was the general contractor for the project. The name "Ronald Reagan" was chosen by future students of the school (those currently in attendance at other North East schools) from a list selected by the district's board of trustees. A spirit committee selected the mascot "Rattlers" from three finalists and chose green, silver, and black as the school colors. Reagan High School opened in 1999.

The opening of Lady Bird Johnson High School in 2008 relieved overcrowding at Reagan as San Antonio's population continued booming in the early part of the 2000s.

== Band ==
The Reagan Marching Band has been in existence since the school was opened in 1999. The band competes in the Texas University Interscholastic League marching competition held every year, and competes annually in different Bands of America events, including the regionals in Arlington, Texas, and Houston, Texas, the super regionals in San Antonio, and the Grand National competition in Indianapolis, Indiana.

Two of the band’s recent major performances were the 2018 Rose Parade in Pasadena, California, and the 2019 Macy's Thanksgiving Day Parade in New York City.

=== Bands of America Grand National Championships competitions ===
Show	Year	Level	Score	Place	Source
The Journey Within	2002	Finals	85.85	11	
Beyond Perimeters	2003	Finals	94.30	2	
You Never Know	2005	Finals	95.65	2	
It Chooses Me	2007	Semi-Finals	87.45	16	
Let It Shine	2012	Finals	87.30	11	
One Love	2016	Finals	91.85	7	
The Path	2021	Finals	91.45	9	
Not So Simple	2025	Finals	93.30	6	

=== Bands of America Super Regional San Antonio competitions ===
Show	Year	Level	Score	Place	Source
Perpetual Motion	2000	Finals	83.35	3	
Out of the Box	2001	Finals	83.55 (Note: Score received a -0.10 penalty under the category Penalty; score would have been 83.65)	2	
The Journey Within	2002	Finals	87.90	3	
Beyond Perimeters	2003	Finals	90.05	4	
Synergy	2004	Finals	92.90	1	
You Never Know	2005	Finals	93.75	1	
Transitions	2006	Finals	93.70	4	
It Chooses Me	2007	Finals	90.35	5	
En Garde	2008	Finals	82.40	14	
Have You Got It In You?	2009	Finals	77.35	14	
RE-	2010	Finals	86.75	6	
Spaces	2011	Finals	83.60	12	
Let It Shine	2012	Finals	87.85	6	
Epinicion	2013	Finals	89.90	5	
Through The Hourglass	2014	Finals	87.35	9	
Every(ONE)	2015	Finals	92.35	2	
One Love	2016	Finals	88.25	8	
Us & Them	2017	Finals	94.875	5	
Loop	2018	Finals	96.40	2	
Secret World	2019	Finals	97.30	1 (Note: The band's first place finish set a record for the highest BOA Regional score (97.3); broken November 2023)	
The Path	2021	Finals	93.975	5	
In Plain Sight	2022	Finals	96.00	3	
From Chaos	2023	Finals	94.45 (Note: Score received a -0.10 penalty under the category Field & Timing; score would have been 94.55)	5	
Fallen	2024	Finals	92.15	8	
Not So Simple	2025	Finals	93.20	6	
With Every Breath	2026	Prelims	89.45	15	

=== Texas UIL state competitions ===
Show	Year	Class	Prelims Place	Finals Place
The Journey Within	2002	5A	Unknown	N/A
Synergy	2004	5A	5	8
Transitions	2006	5A	7	5
Through The Hourglass	2010	5A	12	N/A
Let It Shine	2012	5A	3	8
Through The Hourglass	2014	6A	5	5
One Love	2016	6A	6	6
Loop	2018	6A	6	6
The Path	2021	6A	4	6
In Plain Sight	2022	6A	3	6
From Chaos	2023	6A	6	7
Fallen	2024	6A	9	9
Not So Simple	2025	6A	5	7
With Every Breath	2026	6A	16	N/A

Source: Texas UIL Marching Band State Archives

=== Past shows ===
Show	Year	Grand Nationals
Perpetual Motion	2000	No
Out of the Box	2001	No
The Journey Within	2002	Yes
Beyond Perimeters	2003	Yes
Synergy	2004	No
You Never Know	2005	Yes
Transitions	2006	No
It Chooses Me	2007	Yes
En Garde	2008	No
Have You Got It In You?	2009	No
RE-	2010	No
Spaces	2011	No
Let It Shine	2012	Yes
Epinicion	2013	No
Through The Hourglass	2014	No
Every(ONE)	2015	No
One Love	2016	Yes
Us & Them	2017	No
Loop	2018	No
Secret World	2019	No
Iconic (Note: Non-competitive season due to the COVID-19 Pandemic)	2020	No
The Path	2021	Yes
In Plain Sight	2022	No
From Chaos	2023	No
Fallen	2024	No
Not So Simple	2025	Yes
With Every Breath	2026	No

Source: Ronald Reagan High School Band Website

== Athletics ==
The Reagan Rattlers compete in these sports:

- Baseball
  - State runner-up: 2014 (5A); 2017, 2018, 2022 (6A)
- Basketball
  - Boys state final four: 2005 (5A)
  - Girls state final four: 2012 (5A)
- Cross-country running
- Dance
- Football
- Lacrosse
- Golf
- Soccer
  - Boys
    - State champion: 2002 (5A)
    - State runner-up: 2004 (5A), 2018 (6A)
  - Girls
    - State runner-up: 2004 (5A)
    - State final four: 2002, 2009, 2014 (5A); 2015 (6A)
- Softball
- Swimming and diving
- Tennis
- Track and field
- Volleyball
- Wrestling

== Notable alumni ==
- Celina Lemmen (2003) - Olympic swimmer
- Jeff Manship (2003) - MLB pitcher
- Aaron Reitz (2005) - United States Attorney for the Southern District of Texas
- Anthony Vasquez (2005) - MLB pitcher
- Alexander Hernandez (2010) - UFC fighter
- Tre Demps (2011) - basketball player who played overseas
- Trevor Knight (2012) - NFL quarterback
- D.J. MacLeay (2013) - assistant coach for Boston Celtics
- Ty Summers (2014) - linebacker for the New York Giants
- Kellen Mond (2017) - NFL quarterback
- Pryce Yates (2021) - defensive lineman for the North Carolina Tar Heels
- Brad Jackson (2024) - quarterback for the Texas State Bobcats
- Konner Fox (2019) - UFL tight end for the Orlando Storm
- Brit Morin (2003) - entrepreneur and founder of Brit + Co, a digital media and lifestyle company
