= Theodore Roosevelt High School (San Antonio, Texas) =

Roosevelt High School

Location
- 5110 Walzem Road; San Antonio, Bexar County, Texas 78218; 29.508155°N 98.389864°W

Information
- School type: Public, High School
- Motto: "Qui Plantavit Curabit"
- Founded: 1966
- School district: North East ISD
- NCES School ID: 483294003655
- Principal: Christie Szabo
- Staff: 175.19 (on an FTE basis)
- Grades: 9‍–‍12
- Enrollment: 2,599 (2022‍–‍2023)
- Student to teacher ratio: 14.84
- Language: English
- Campus: Suburban
- Colors: Red, White & Blue
- Athletics conference: UIL Class 6A
- Mascot: Rough Riders
- Newspaper: The Big Stick
- Feeder schools: General Walter Krueger Middle School; Edward H. White Middle School
- Website: Official Website

Theodore Roosevelt High School is a public high school in San Antonio, Texas (United States). The school is part of the North East Independent School District, which serves portions of San Antonio and the City of Windcrest. It is classified as a 6A school by the UIL. It first opened for classes in 1966, funded by a 1960 school district bond that also established Churchill High School and the Blossom Athletic Center. During 2022‍–‍2023, Roosevelt High School had an enrollment of 2,599 students and a student to teacher ratio of 14.84. The school received an overall rating of "C" from the Texas Education Agency for the 2024‍–‍2025 school year.

Roosevelt is host to three magnet programs:

- Design and Technology Academy
- Engineering & Technologies Academy
- Space & Engineering Technologies Academy

Roosevelt was named a National Blue Ribbon School in 1999-2000.

== Design and Technology Academy ==
The Design and Technology Academy (DATA), located on the campus of the school, has approximately 480 students from grades 9 to 12. It was opened in the fall semester of 1999, with its first graduating class in 2002, and first full-four year graduating class in 2003. DATA is a magnet school which specializes in engineering, architecture, web/graphic design, programming and multimedia.

== Athletics ==
The Roosevelt Rough Riders compete in the following sports:

- Baseball
- Basketball
- Cross Country
- Football
- Golf
- Soccer
- Softball
- Swimming and Diving
- Tennis
- Track and Field
- Volleyball
- Wrestling

State Championships

- Football

1995 5A Division II

== Notable alumni ==
- Scott Coolbaugh (Class of 1984) — Former MLB baseball player and current hitting coach for the Baltimore Orioles
- Erik Flowers (Class of 1996) — Former NFL player and 2000 NFL draft Buffalo Bills 1st Round Pick.
- William H. McRaven (Class of 1973) — Retired Admiral and now Chancellor of the University of Texas System
- Rashad Owens (Class of 2020) — NFL wide receiver for the Cincinnati Bengals
- Jeff Smisek (Class of 1972) — Former President and CEO of United Airlines.
