= Winston Churchill High School (San Antonio, Texas) =

Location
- 12049 Blanco Road; San Antonio, Bexar County, Texas 78216; 29.549983°N 98.512348°W

Information
- School type: Public, high school
- Motto: Never, Never, Never, Never give up! - Winston Churchill
- Founded: 1966
- Locale: City: Large
- School district: North East ISD
- NCES School ID: 483294003630
- Principal: Todd Bloomer
- Staff: 157.34 (on an FTE basis)
- Grades: 9–12
- Enrollment: 2,405 (2023–2024)
- Student to teacher ratio: 15.29
- Language: English
- Colors: Black, White, and Red
- Athletics conference: UIL Class 6A
- Mascot: Chargers
- Feeder schools: Eisenhower Middle School; Bradley Middle School; Jackson Middle School
- Rival schools: Clark High School; MacArthur High School; Reagan High School
- Website: Churchill High School

Winston Churchill High School in San Antonio, Texas is part of the North East Independent School District. The school serves portions of the city of San Antonio along with the towns of Hill Country Village and Hollywood Park. During 2022–2023, Churchill High School had an enrollment of 2,510 students and a student to teacher ratio of 15.74. For the 2024-2025 school year, the school was given a "C" by the Texas Education Agency, with distinctions for Academic Achievement in ELA/Reading and Mathematics.

== History ==
Churchill High School is named after Sir Winston Churchill, former Prime Minister of the United Kingdom. Churchill first opened for classes in 1966, funded by a 1960 school district bond that also established Roosevelt High School and the Blossom Athletic Center.

Churchill has been twice named a National Blue Ribbon School, in 1982-83 and again in 1999-2000. In 2012, Churchill was ranked 8th on Children at Risk's Top 10 High Schools in Greater San Antonio.

The school mascot is the Charger while the British Union Flag and lion are used as additional symbols. The school was referenced in the 1996 movie Lone Star.

== Athletics ==
The football team won the 4A state championship in 1976. Starting in 1984, the Churchill High School football team would play the Clark High School football team in a rivalry game nicknamed the "Gucci Bowl". The two schools face off every year and the game used to signal the start of the high school football season in San Antonio.

The boys' basketball team won the 1982 5A state championship.

The boys' soccer program won the Texas State Championship in 1989, 1998, 2001, and 2003.

== Notable alumni ==
- Glenn Blackwood, NFL safety
- Lyle Blackwood, NFL safety
- Abby Brammell, actress
- Clevon Brown, basketball player
- Scott Bryant, baseball player, 1989 winner of the Dick Howser Trophy
- Cody Carlson, NFL quarterback
- Randy Choate, MLB pitcher
- Carli Cronk, swimmer, Summer Deaflympics record holder
- Josh Davis, swimmer, 3x Olympic Gold Medalist
- Steve Davis, MLB pitcher for Toronto Blue Jays and Cleveland Indians
- Scott Dunn, MLB player
- Trenton Estep, 2018 IMSA Porsche GT3 Cup Challenge Champion
- Jimmy Feigen, US Olympic swimmer
- Dimitri Flowers, NFL fullback
- Kimberly Friedmutter (Williams), model and actress, author.
- Hudson Head, baseball outfielder
- Callie Hernandez, actress
- Jeff Hiller, actor.
- Gary C. Kelly, business executive; current chairman of the board and former CEO of Southwest Airlines
- Jack Neely, MLB pitcher for the Chicago Cubs
- Derek Lee Nixon, actor
- Alan Palomo, creator of Neon Indian
- Pete Sessions, U.S. Congressman
- Alex Van Pelt, NFL player and coach
- Bill White, Houston mayor, gubernatorial candidate
