= James Madison High School (San Antonio) =

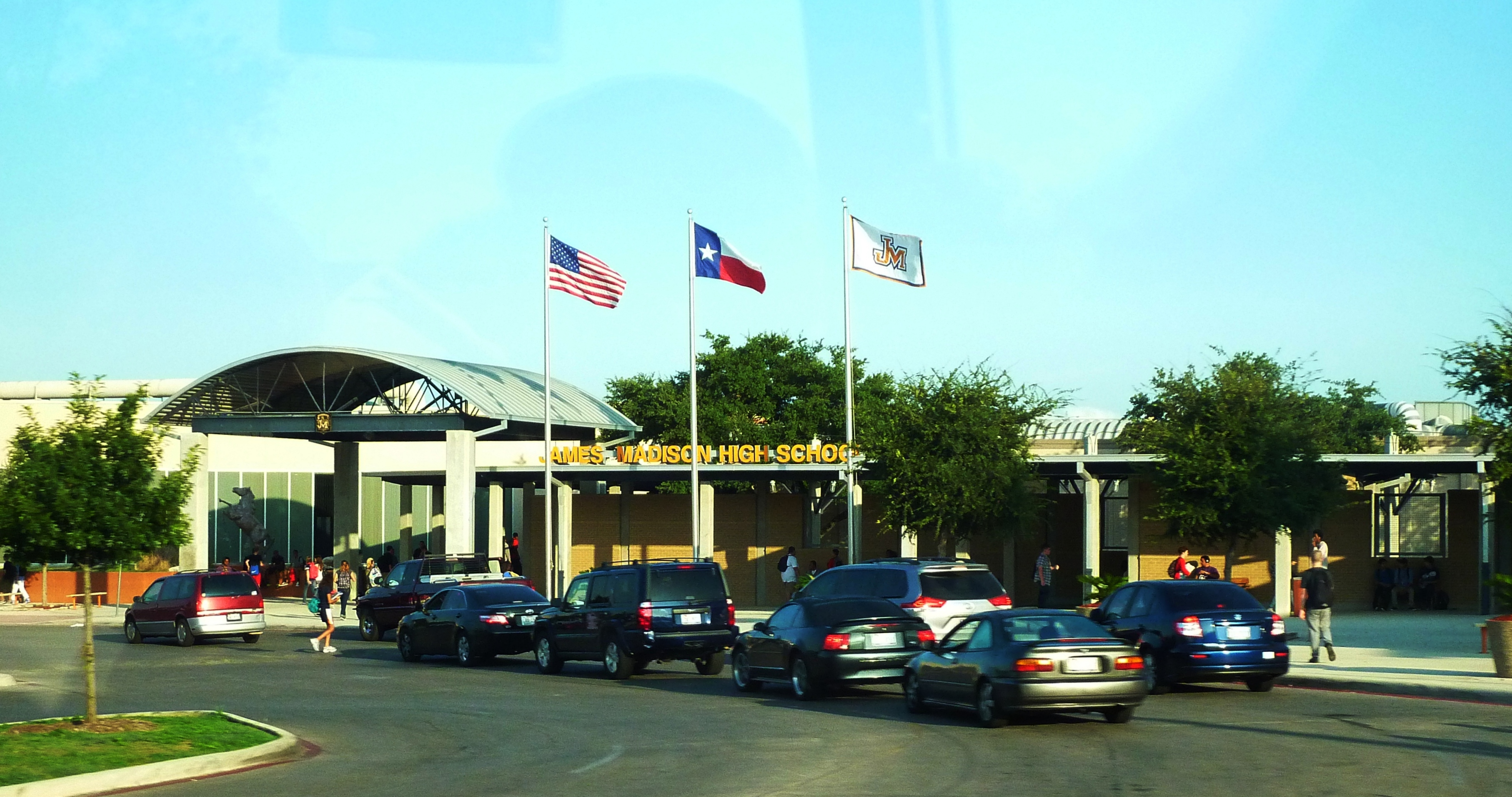

Location
- 5005 Stahl Road; San Antonio, Bexar County, Texas 78247; United States; 29.581867°N 98.391615°W

Information
- School type: Public, high school
- Founded: 1976
- Locale: City: Large
- School district: North East ISD
- NCES School ID: 483294003647
- Principal: Eric Wernli
- Staff: 173.95 (on an FTE basis)
- Grades: 9‍–‍12
- Enrollment: 2,703 (2023‍–‍2024)
- Student to teacher ratio: 15.54
- Language: English
- Colors: Orange, Blue, and White
- Athletics conference: UIL Class AAAAAA
- Mascot: Maverick
- Feeder schools: Wood Middle School; Driscoll Middle School; Harris Middle School
- Sports District: 27‍–‍6A
- Website: Official Website

James Madison High School is a public high school, named after U.S. President James Madison, located in the North East Independent School District (NEISD) in San Antonio, Texas and classified as a 6A school by the University Interscholastic League. During 2023‍–‍2024, Madison High School had an enrollment of 2,703 students and a student to teacher ratio of 15.54. The school received an overall rating of "C" from the Texas Education Agency for the 2024‍–‍2025 school year.

== Academics ==
Founded in 1976, Madison High School graduated its first class in 1980. The school won the Superintendent's Pride Trophy for six consecutive years. Offering space for 3,200+ students, the school currently has the largest student population in its district.

To graduate per the NEISD, the school requires four credits in English, three credits in mathematics, three credits in science, three credits in social studies, two credits in a Language other than English, one credit in physical education, one credit in fine arts, and half a credit in health education.

For college credit, the school offers Advanced Placement (AP), dual enrollment, and dual credit classes. Dual enrollment classes are offered online and on-site at the University of Texas at Austin, while dual credit classes are offered at the school through Alamo Community College, St. Philip's College, and Palo Alto College.

== Heroes Stadium ==
A field where the James Madison Mavericks play, they first played here on June 4, 2009.

== Agriscience Magnet Program ==
James Madison High School is home to an Agriscience Magnet Program (AMP), which was known as being government-funded and one of the largest of its kind in Texas in 2008. The magnet school offers open enrollment and has six career pathways.

== Sporting achievements ==
In 2009, the Madison Mavericks boys bowling team won the state championship. Bowling is a club sport in Texas high schools, not governed by the UIL.

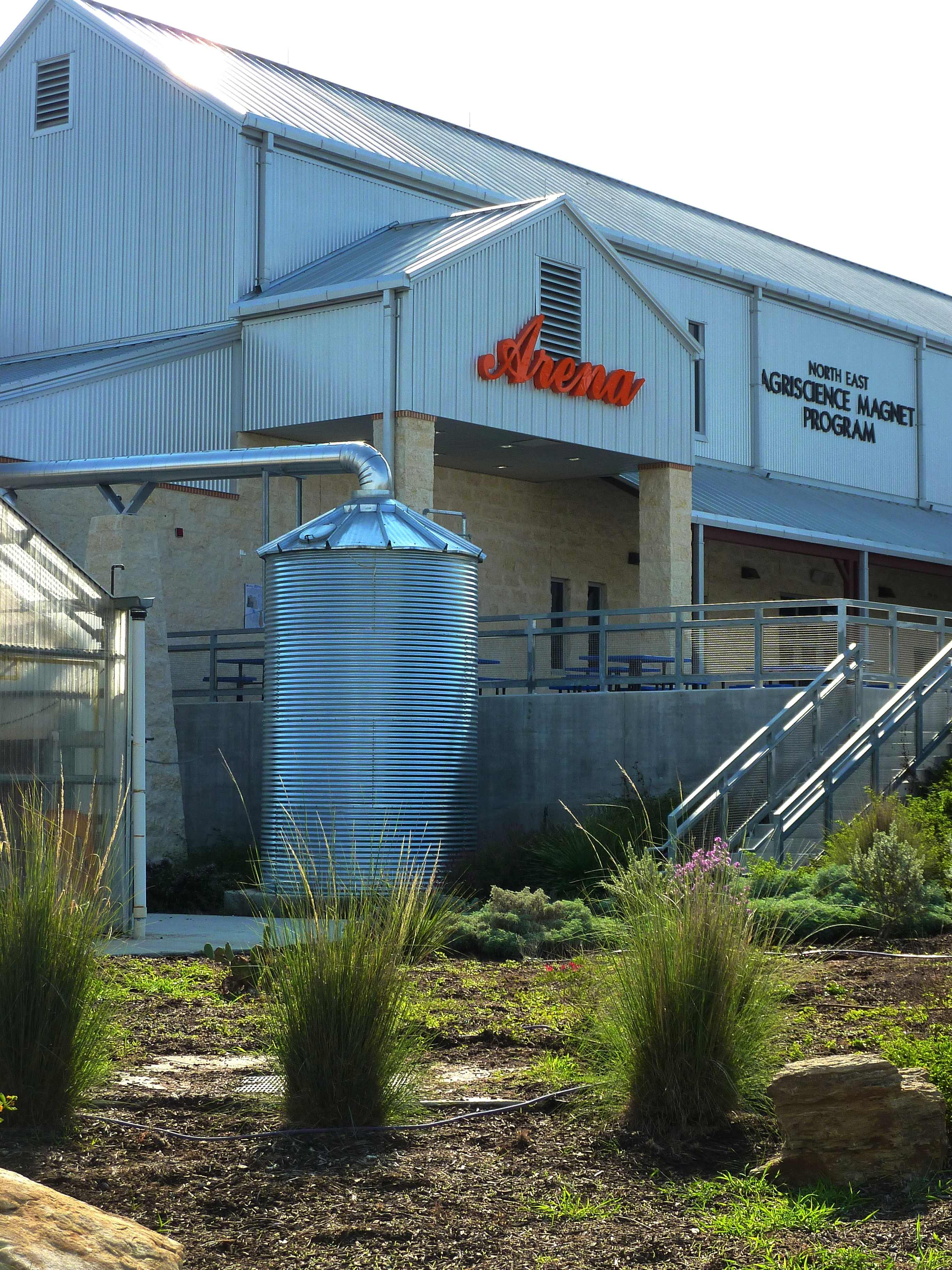
The Arena at the NEAMP

The girls soccer program won the UIL 5A state championship in 1991 and 1993. From 1988 to 1995 they made six state final four tournament appearances playing in four state finals.

== Notable alumni ==
- Sunny Anderson (class of 1993), chef
- Norm Charlton (class of 1981), former Major League Baseball relief pitcher
- David Edwards, former Madison varsity football player and motivational speaker; suffered paralysis in a game-time injury
- Jeff Foster (class of 1995), former NBA basketball player
- Keith O'Quinn (class of 1991), American football coach, former special teams coordinator for the Dallas Cowboys
- Jared Padalecki (class of 2000), actor
- Todd Pletcher (class of 1985), American thoroughbred horse trainer
- Mitchell Price (class of 1985), American football player
- Jocko Sims (class of 1999), actor
- Vincent Taylor (class of 2013), NFL defensive end for the Atlanta Falcons
