= Legacy of Educational Excellence High School =

Location
- 1400 Jackson-Keller Road; San Antonio, Bexar County, Texas 78213; United States; 29°30′25″N 98°30′57″W

Information
- School type: Public, high school
- Founded: 1958
- Locale: City: Large
- School district: North East ISD
- NCES School ID: 483294003645
- Staff: 149.33 (on an FTE basis)
- Grades: 9–12
- Enrollment: 2,390 (2022–2023)
- Student to teacher ratio: 16.00
- Colors: Red and Gray
- Athletics conference: UIL Class 6A
- Nickname: Volunteers (or Vols)
- Feeder schools: Nimitz Middle School; Jackson Middle School
- Website: www.neisd.net/lee/

Legacy of Educational Excellence (L.E.E.) High School, formerly Robert E. Lee High School, is a high school in San Antonio, Texas. A part of the North East Independent School District (NEISD), it serves portions of San Antonio, all of the city of City of Castle Hills, and a portion of Balcones Heights. For the 2024-2025 school year, the school was given a "D" by the Texas Education Agency.

== History ==
The school opened in 1958. It was originally named after general Robert E. Lee.

=== Robert E. Lee and Confederate naming ===
In 1991 the school retired the usage of uniforms for athletes and band members which had Confederate battle flags. The band used to perform a rendition of the song "Dixie" during athletic competitions but NEISD removed this as well; these moves were done to lessen the stigma against the school. For a period the school continued allowing students to display the Confederate battle flag on their clothing and personal items.

The NEISD school board has twice voted on whether to rename the school to address concerns about the safety and focus of students in the context of national debate around memorializing the Confederacy. The board considered whether to rename the school in 2015, after the Charleston church shooting occurred. Lee student Kayla Wilson created an online petition asking for a rename, and students asked the board of trustees of NEISD to consider renaming Lee. Mayor of San Antonio Julián Castro also supported renaming. The vote failed on a 5-2 basis.

In August 2017, after the Unite the Right rally in Charlottesville, Virginia, a San Antonio resident created an online petition to have the school renamed. Another individual created a petition asking for the name to be kept. That month the board voted in favor of retiring the Robert E. Lee name; it did not immediately determine what the new name of the school would be.

The board wished to name the school after an idea instead of a person and asked for suggestions. It received 2,400 proposals, and the district rejected 1,900 of them due to not matching the district's parameters and/or due to obscenities. The San Antonio Express-News characterized several of the proposals as having "offensive and inappropriate references." In October 2017 the NEISD board agreed to change the name of the school to Legacy of Educational Excellence (L.E.E.) High School on a 5 to 2 vote. The rename took place in fall 2018. Initially the "volunteer" remained as the school's mascot, but in April 2018 the district announced that the new mascot was a military service dog wearing a military service vest after students voted in favor of that mascot.

In addition to the new mascot and name, the statue of Robert E. Lee, along with most other named signs were taken down.

== Magnet schools ==
Lee is host to three magnet schools:

- North East School of the Arts (NESA), a fine arts school that offers seven majors; musical theatre, dance, instrumental music, visual arts, cinema, creative writing, and technical theatre. Each school year season NESA produces a couple of Broadway-caliber shows through the collective teamwork of the majors, as well as many major specific performances.
- International School of the Americas (ISA), a school that although is not officially attached to the Lee Population, resides on the campus. ISA provides a largely global and social-science oriented education. Typically, ISA students will take an out-of-state trip according to their year to apply their knowledge.
- Science, Technology, Engineering and Mathematics (STEM) Academy, a rigorous education focused on one of the four STEM pathways: Science, Technology (Computer Science), Engineering, and Mathematics.

L.E.E. has its own general population that are not in one of the 3 magnet programs.

== Notable alumni ==
- Lubov Azria, fashion designer
- Ricardo Antonio Chavira, actor
- Joey Batrouni (Class of 2021), soccer player.
- Bruce Collie (Class of 1980), former NFL offensive lineman (T) who played eight years for the San Francisco 49ers and Philadelphia Eagles. He won two Super Bowls with San Francisco.
- Tommy Kramer (Class of 1973), former NFL quarterback for 14 seasons with the Minnesota Vikings and New Orleans Saints.
- Travis Lewis (Class of 2007), former NFL linebacker for the Detroit Lions.
- Chris Marrou, former news anchor for KENS 5-TV in San Antonio, TX from 1973-2009
- Richard Osborne (Class of 1972), former NFL receiver and kick returner who played four seasons for the Philadelphia Eagles, New York Jets, and St. Louis Cardinals.
- Grace Phipps (Class of 2010), actress, Fright Night, Nine Lives of Chloe King, The Vampire Diaries, and Teen Beach Movie
- George Postolos (Class of 1982), former president of Houston Astros and Houston Rockets
- Pat Rockett (Class of 1973), former MLB baseball player
- James Scully, actor
- Pendleton Ward, creator of cartoon series Adventure Time
