= 1973 in the United States =

- Decades: 1950s; 1960s; 1970s; 1980s; 1990s
- See also: History of the United States (1964–1980); Timeline of United States history (1970–1989); List of years in the United States

Events from the year 1973 in the United States. The year saw a number of important historical events in the country, including the death of former President Lyndon B. Johnson, the U.S. Supreme Court's decision on Roe v. Wade, the signing of the Paris Peace Accords and end of the United States participation in the Vietnam War, the end of the post-World War II boom and the beginning of the first of a series of recessions that continued over the next decade, and the first oil crisis.

== Incumbents ==
=== Federal government ===
- President: Richard Nixon (R-California)
- Vice President:

Spiro Agnew (R-Maryland) (until October 10)
vacant (October 10 – December 6)
Gerald Ford (R-Michigan) (starting December 6)

- Chief Justice: Warren E. Burger (Virginia)
- Speaker of the House of Representatives: Carl Albert (D-Oklahoma)
- Senate Majority Leader: Mike Mansfield (D-Montana)
- Congress: 92nd (until January 3), 93rd (starting January 3)

==== State governments ====
Governors and lieutenant governors

=== Governors ===
- Governor of Alabama: George Wallace (Democratic)
- Governor of Alaska: William A. Egan (Democratic)
- Governor of Arizona: Jack Richard Williams (Republican)
- Governor of Arkansas: Dale Bumpers (Democratic)
- Governor of California: Ronald Reagan (Republican)
- Governor of Colorado: John Arthur Love (Republican) (until July 16), John David Vanderhoof (Republican) (starting July 16)
- Governor of Connecticut: Thomas J. Meskill (Republican)
- Governor of Delaware: Russell W. Peterson (Republican) (until January 16), Sherman W. Tribbitt (Democratic) (starting January 16)
- Governor of Florida: Reubin Askew (Democratic)
- Governor of Georgia: Jimmy Carter (Democratic)
- Governor of Hawaii: John A. Burns (Democratic)
- Governor of Idaho: Cecil D. Andrus (Democratic)
- Governor of Illinois: Richard B. Ogilvie (Republican) (until January 8), Dan Walker (Democratic) (starting January 8)
- Governor of Indiana: Edgar Whitcomb (Republican) (until January 8), Otis R. Bowen (Republican) (starting January 8)
- Governor of Iowa: Robert D. Ray (Republican)
- Governor of Kansas: Robert Docking (Democratic)
- Governor of Kentucky: Wendell H. Ford (Democratic)
- Governor of Louisiana: Edwin W. Edwards (Democratic)
- Governor of Maine: Kenneth M. Curtis (Democratic)
- Governor of Maryland: Marvin Mandel (Democratic)
- Governor of Massachusetts: Francis W. Sargent (Republican)
- Governor of Michigan: William Milliken (Republican)
- Governor of Minnesota: Wendell R. Anderson (Democratic)
- Governor of Mississippi: Bill Waller (Democratic)
- Governor of Missouri: Warren E. Hearnes (Democratic) (until January 8), Kit Bond (Republican) (starting January 8)
- Governor of Montana: Forrest H. Anderson (Democratic) (until January 1), Thomas Lee Judge (Democratic) (starting January 1)
- Governor of Nebraska: J. James Exon (Democratic)
- Governor of Nevada: Mike O'Callaghan (Democratic)
- Governor of New Hampshire: Walter R. Peterson Jr. (Republican) (until January 4), Meldrim Thomson Jr. (Republican) (starting January 4)
- Governor of New Jersey: William T. Cahill (Republican)
- Governor of New Mexico: Bruce King (Democratic)
- Governor of New York: Nelson Rockefeller (Republican) (until December 18), Malcolm Wilson (Republican) (starting December 18)
- Governor of North Carolina: Robert W. Scott (Democratic) (until January 5), James Holshouser (Republican) (starting January 5)
- Governor of North Dakota: William L. Guy (Democratic) (until January 2), Arthur A. Link (Democratic) (starting January 2)
- Governor of Ohio: John J. Gilligan (Democratic)
- Governor of Oklahoma: David Hall (Democratic)
- Governor of Oregon: Tom McCall (Republican)
- Governor of Pennsylvania: Milton Shapp (Democratic)
- Governor of Rhode Island: Frank Licht (Democratic) (until January 2), Philip W. Noel (Democratic) (starting January 2)
- Governor of South Carolina: John C. West (Democratic)
- Governor of South Dakota: Richard F. Kneip (Democratic)
- Governor of Tennessee: Winfield Dunn (Republican)
- Governor of Texas: Preston Smith (Democratic) (until January 16), Dolph Briscoe (Democratic) (starting January 16)
- Governor of Utah: Cal Rampton (Democratic)
- Governor of Vermont: Deane C. Davis (Republican) (until January 4), Thomas P. Salmon (Democratic) (starting January 4)
- Governor of Virginia: Linwood Holton (Republican)
- Governor of Washington: Daniel J. Evans (Republican)
- Governor of West Virginia: Arch A. Moore Jr. (Republican)
- Governor of Wisconsin: Patrick J. Lucey (Democratic)
- Governor of Wyoming: Stanley K. Hathaway (Republican)

=== Lieutenant governors ===
- Lieutenant Governor of Alabama: Jere Beasley (Democratic)
- Lieutenant Governor of Alaska: H. A. Boucher (Democratic)
- Lieutenant Governor of Arkansas: Bob C. Riley (Democratic)
- Lieutenant Governor of California: Edwin Reinecke (Republican)
- Lieutenant Governor of Colorado: John David Vanderhoof (Republican) (until July 16), Ted L. Strickland (Republican) (starting July 16)
- Lieutenant Governor of Connecticut: T. Clark Hull (Republican) (until June 7), Peter L. Cashman (Republican) (starting June 7)
- Lieutenant Governor of Delaware: Eugene Bookhammer (Republican)
- Lieutenant Governor of Florida: Thomas Burton Adams Jr. (Democratic)
- Lieutenant Governor of Georgia: Lester Maddox (Democratic)
- Lieutenant Governor of Hawaii: George Ariyoshi (Democratic)
- Lieutenant Governor of Idaho: Jack M. Murphy (Democratic)
- Lieutenant Governor of Illinois: Paul Simon (Democratic) (until January 8), Neil Hartigan (Democratic) (starting January 8)
- Lieutenant Governor of Indiana: Richard E. Folz (Republican) (until January 8), Robert D. Orr (Republican) (starting January 8)
- Lieutenant Governor of Iowa: vacant (until month and day unknown), Arthur A. Neu (Republican) (starting month and day unknown)
- Lieutenant Governor of Kansas: Reynolds Shultz (Republican) (until January 8), Dave Owen (Republican) (starting January 8)
- Lieutenant Governor of Kentucky: Julian Carroll (Democratic)
- Lieutenant Governor of Louisiana: Jimmy Fitzmorris (Democratic)
- Lieutenant Governor of Maryland: Blair Lee III (political party unknown)
- Lieutenant Governor of Massachusetts: Donald R. Dwight (Republican)
- Lieutenant Governor of Michigan: James H. Brickley (Republican)
- Lieutenant Governor of Minnesota: Rudy Perpich (Democratic)
- Lieutenant Governor of Mississippi: William F. Winter (Democratic)
- Lieutenant Governor of Missouri: William S. Morris (Democratic) (until January 8), William C. Phelps (Republican) (starting month and day unknown)
- Lieutenant Governor of Montana: Thomas Lee Judge (Democratic) (until month and day unknown), Bill Christiansen (Democratic) (starting month and day unknown)
- Lieutenant Governor of Nebraska: Frank Marsh (Republican)
- Lieutenant Governor of Nevada: Harry Reid (Democratic)
- Lieutenant Governor of New Mexico: Roberto Mondragón (Democratic)
- Lieutenant Governor of New York: Malcolm Wilson (Republican) (until December 18), Warren M. Anderson (Republican) (starting December 18)
- Lieutenant Governor of North Carolina: Hoyt Patrick Taylor Jr. (Democratic) (until January 6), Jim Hunt (Democratic) (starting January 6)
- Lieutenant Governor of North Dakota: Richard F. Larsen (Republican) (until month and day unknown), Wayne G. Sanstead (Democratic) (starting month and day unknown)
- Lieutenant Governor of Ohio: John William Brown (Republican)
- Lieutenant Governor of Oklahoma: George Nigh (Democratic)
- Lieutenant Governor of Pennsylvania: Ernest P. Kline (Democratic)
- Lieutenant Governor of Rhode Island: J. Joseph Garrahy (Democratic)
- Lieutenant Governor of South Carolina: Earle Morris Jr. (Democratic)
- Lieutenant Governor of South Dakota: William Dougherty (Democratic)
- Lieutenant Governor of Tennessee: John S. Wilder (Democratic)
- Lieutenant Governor of Texas: Ben Barnes (Democratic) (until January 16), William P. Hobby Jr. (Democratic) (starting January 16)
- Lieutenant Governor of Vermont: John S. Burgess (Republican)
- Lieutenant Governor of Virginia: Henry Howell (Democratic)
- Lieutenant Governor of Washington: John Cherberg (Democratic)
- Lieutenant Governor of Wisconsin: Martin J. Schreiber (Democratic)

== Events ==
=== January ===
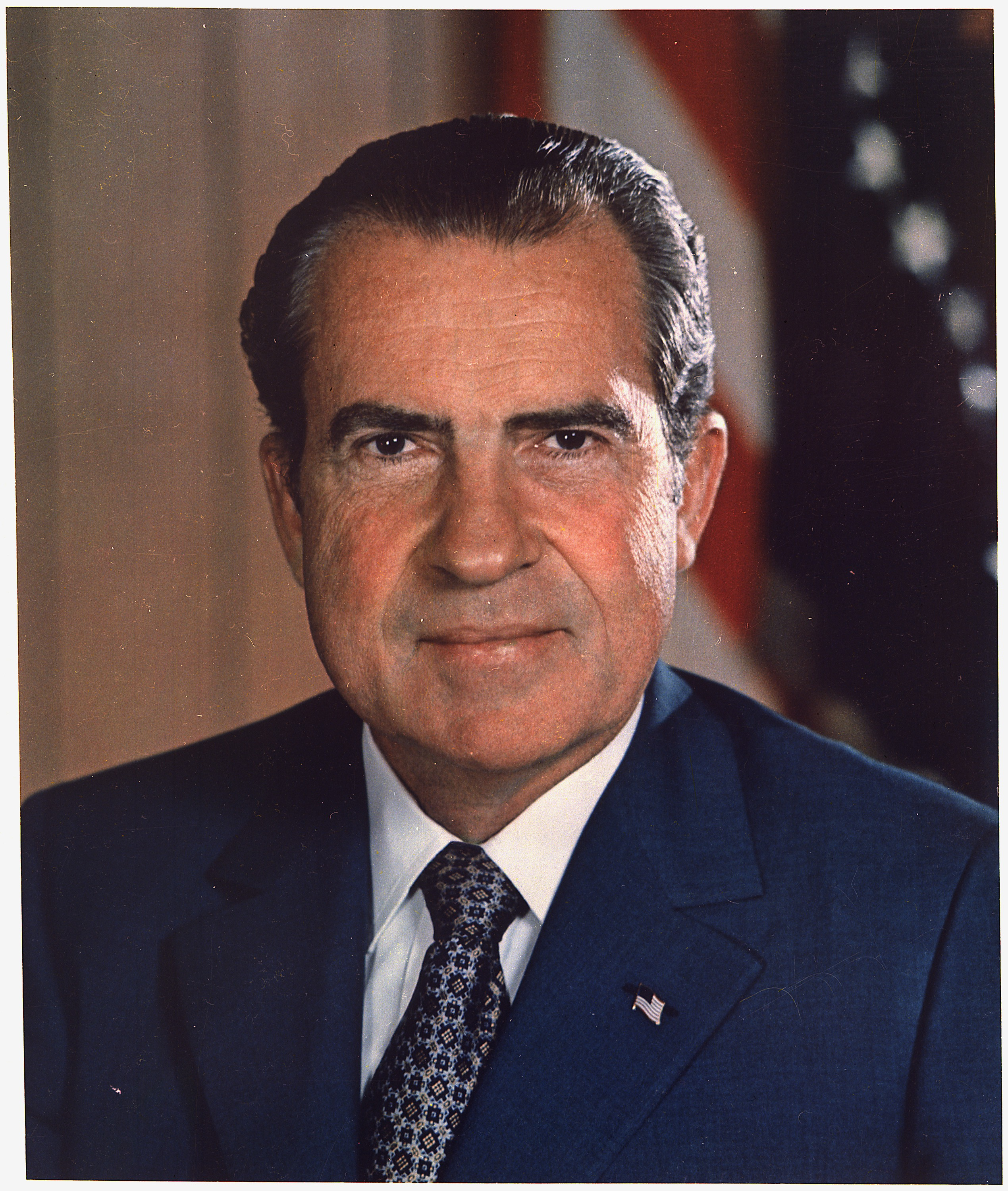
January 20: Richard Nixon, the 37th president of the United States, begins his second term

- January 1 – CBS sells the New York Yankees baseball team for $10 million to a 12-person syndicate led by George Steinbrenner ($3.2 million more than CBS paid for the Yankees).
- January 7 – Mark Essex kills four civilians and three police officers during a siege at the Downtown Howard Johnson's Motor Lodge in New Orleans. Ten hours after the siege began, Essex is killed by a volley of gunfire from police officers stationed inside a Marine helicopter.
- January 14
  - Elvis Presley's concert in Hawaii is the first worldwide telecast by an entertainer watched by more people than the Apollo Moon landings. However, it is not shown in Eastern Bloc countries because of communist censorship (with the sole exception of East Germany, where it is shown on Der schwarze Kanal). In the United States and Brazil, it does not air until April of this year.
  - Super Bowl VII: The Miami Dolphins defeat the Washington Redskins 14–7 to complete the National Football League's first (and only, thus far) perfect season.
- January 15 – Vietnam War: Citing progress in peace negotiations, President Richard Nixon announces the suspension of offensive action in North Vietnam.
- January 20 – President Nixon and Vice President Agnew are sworn in for their second term.
- January 22
  - Roe v. Wade: The U.S. Supreme Court overturns state bans on abortion.
  - Former President Lyndon B. Johnson dies at his ranch in Johnson City, Texas, leaving no former U.S. presidents living until the resignation of Richard Nixon in 1974.
  - George Foreman wins boxing's World Heavyweight Championship, defeating Joe Frazier by technical knockout in the second round at Kingston, Jamaica.
- January 23 – President Nixon announces that a peace accord has been reached in Vietnam.
- January 27 – U.S. involvement in the Vietnam War ends with the signing of the Paris Peace Accords. The U.S. military draft is also abolished on this same day, as the Nixon administration announces on this day that there will be no draft calls in 1973, and that it will not request an extension of the U.S. government's draft authority, which goes on to expire on June 30 of this year.
- January 30 – G. Gordon Liddy is found guilty of Watergate charges.
- January 31 – Pan American and Trans World Airlines cancel their options to buy 13 Concorde airliners.

=== February ===
- February 11 – Vietnam War: The first American prisoners of war are released from Vietnam.
- February 12 – Ohio becomes the first U.S. state to post road distance signs in metric (see Metric system in the United States).
- February 13 – The United States Dollar is devalued by 10%.
- February 21 – The 5.8 M_{w} Point Mugu earthquake affected the south coast of California with a maximum Mercalli intensity of VII (Very strong). Several people were injured and damage totaled $1 million.
- February 27 – The American Indian Movement occupies Wounded Knee, South Dakota.
- February 28 – The landmark postmodern novel Gravity's Rainbow by Thomas Pynchon is published.

=== March ===
- March 1 – Charlotte's Web, the animated film based on the children's book of the same name, is released.
- March 12 – Last episode of original Laugh-In airs on NBC. The show will continue with re-runs until May 14, 1973.
- March 17 – Many of the few remaining United States soldiers begin to leave Vietnam. One reunion of a former POW with his family is immortalized in the Pulitzer Prize-winning photograph Burst of Joy.
- March 23 – Watergate scandal (United States): In a letter to Judge John Sirica, Watergate burglar James W. McCord Jr. admits that he and other defendants have been pressured to remain silent about the case. He names former Attorney General John Mitchell as 'overall boss' of the operation.
- March 26
  - UCLA captures its seventh consecutive college basketball national championship and eighth in ten seasons under John Wooden, defeating Memphis State 87–66 in the finals of the NCAA tournament at St. Louis. UCLA center Bill Walton sets championship game records by connecting on 21 of 22 field goal attempts and scoring 44 points.
  - TV soap opera The Young and the Restless and game show The $10,000 Pyramid debuts on CBS.
- March 27 – The 45th Academy Awards ceremony, hosted by Carol Burnett, Michael Caine, Charlton Heston and Rock Hudson, is held at Dorothy Chandler Pavilion in Los Angeles. Francis Ford Coppola's The Godfather wins Best Picture, also tied with Bob Fosse's adaptation of Cabaret in receiving ten nominations. The latter film wins eight awards, including Best Director for Fosse. The ceremony draws a television audience of 85 million viewers.
- March 29 – The last United States soldier leaves Vietnam.

=== April ===
- April 3 – The first handheld cellular phone call is made by Martin Cooper in New York City.
- April 4 – The World Trade Center officially opens in New York City with a ribbon cutting ceremony.
- April 6
  - Pioneer 11 is launched on a mission to study the Solar System.
  - Ron Blomberg of the New York Yankees becomes the first designated hitter in Major League Baseball.
- April 17
  - Federal Express officially begins operations, with the launch of 14 small aircraft from Memphis International Airport. On that night, Federal Express delivers 186 packages to 25 U.S. cities from Rochester, New York, to Miami, Florida.
  - For the first time, the Army Corps of Engineers opens the Morganza Spillway near Baton Rouge to relieve record flooding along the lower Mississippi River.
- April 26 – The first day of trading on the Chicago Board Options Exchange.
- April 28 – The last section of the IRT Third Avenue Line from 149th Street to Gun Hill Road in The Bronx is closed.
- April 30 – Watergate scandal: President Richard Nixon announces that White House Counsel John Dean has been fired and that Attorney General Richard Kleindienst has resigned along with staffers H. R. Haldeman and John Ehrlichman.

=== May ===
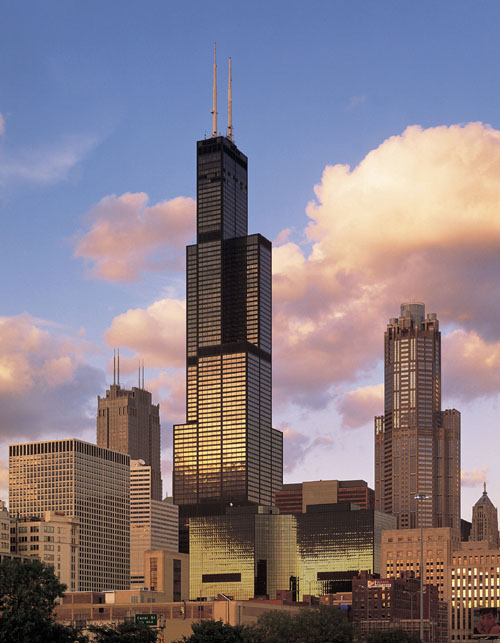
May 3: Sears Tower is completed

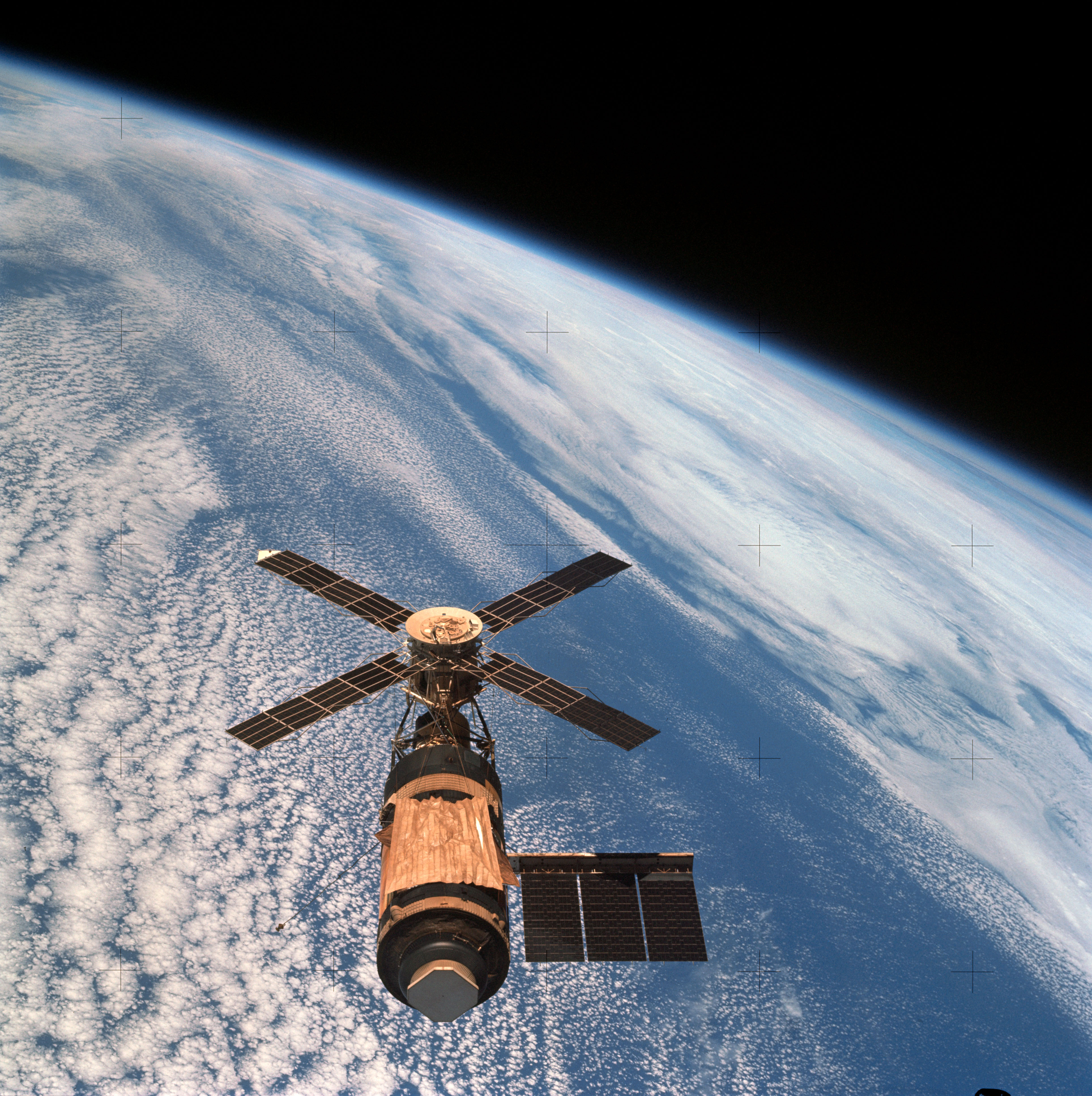
May 14: Skylab is launched

- May 1 – Following President Richard Nixon's visit to mainland China, the United States establishes a liaison office in Beijing.
- May 3 – The Sears Tower in Chicago is finished, becoming the world's tallest building (record held until 1998).
- May 5
  - Secretariat wins the Kentucky Derby and sets a new time record for the event.
  - Led Zeppelin plays before 56,800 people at Tampa Stadium on the band's 1973 North American Tour, thus breaking the August 15, 1965, record of 55,600 set by The Beatles at Shea Stadium.
- May 8 – A 71-day standoff between federal authorities and American Indian Movement activists who were occupying the Pine Ridge Reservation at Wounded Knee, South Dakota, ends with the surrender of the militants.
- May 10 – The New York Knicks defeat the Los Angeles Lakers, 102–93 in Game 5 of the NBA Finals to win the NBA title.
- May 13 – Bobby Riggs challenges and defeats Margaret Court, the world's #1 women's player, in a nationally televised tennis match set in Ramona, CA northeast of San Diego. Riggs wins 6–2, 6-1 which leads to the huge Battle of the Sexes match against Billie Jean King later in the year on September 20.
- May 14 – Skylab, the United States' first space station, is launched.
- May 17 – Watergate scandal: Televised hearings begin in the United States Senate.
- May 19 – Secretariat wins the Preakness Stakes by 2 1/2 lengths over the amazingly quick second placed Sham. A malfunction in the track's timing equipment prevented a confirmed new track record.
- May 25 – Skylab 2 (Pete Conrad, Paul Weitz, Joseph Kerwin) is launched on a mission to repair damage to the recently launched Skylab space station.
- May 30 – Gordon Johncock wins the Indianapolis 500 in the Patrick Racing Special Eagle-Offenhauser, after only 133 laps, (The race was begun on May 28 but called off because of accidents and rain, and could not be restarted May 29.)

=== June ===
- June 4 – A United States patent for the Docutel automated teller machine is granted to Donald Wetzel, Tom Barnes and George Chastain.
- June 9 – Secretariat wins the Belmont Stakes by 31 lengths becoming a Triple Crown winner and breaking a 25-year hiatus since 1948.
- June 16 – U.S. President Richard Nixon begins several talks with Soviet leader Leonid Brezhnev.
- June 17 – The submersible Johnson Sea Link becomes entangled on the wreckage of the USS Fred T. Berry off Key West, Florida. The submersible is brought to the surface the following day, but two of the four men aboard die of carbon dioxide poisoning.
- June 21 – The Supreme Court of the U.S. delivers its decision in the landmark case Miller v. California, establishing the "Miller test" for determining obscenity.
- June 22 – W. Mark Felt ("Deep Throat") retires from the Federal Bureau of Investigation.
- June 24 – UpStairs Lounge arson attack: A fire at a gay bar in New Orleans' French Quarter kills 32.
- June 25 – Watergate scandal: Former White House counsel John Dean begins his testimony before the Senate Watergate Committee.

=== July ===
- July 1 – The United States Drug Enforcement Administration is founded.
- July 2 – The United States Congress passes the Education of the Handicapped Act (EHA), mandating Special Education federally.
- July 5 – A catastrophic BLEVE (Boiling Liquid Expanding Vapor Explosion) in Kingman, Arizona kills 11 firefighters. The explosion occurred after a fire broke out as propane was being transferred from a railroad car to a storage tank. This explosion has become a classic incident, studied in fire department training programs worldwide.
- July 12 – 1973 National Archives Fire: A major fire destroys the entire 6th floor of the National Personnel Records Center in St. Louis, Missouri.
- July 15 – Nolan Ryan of the California Angels pitches his second no-hitter of the season against the Detroit Tigers. He previous no-hit the Kansas City Royals exactly two months prior.
- July 16 – Watergate Scandal: Former White House aide Alexander Butterfield informs the United States Senate Watergate Committee that President Richard Nixon had secretly recorded potentially incriminating conversations.
- July 28
  - Skylab 3 (Owen Garriott, Jack Lousma, Alan Bean) is launched, to conduct various medical and scientific experiments aboard Skylab.
  - The Summer Jam at Watkins Glen, a massive rock festival featuring the Grateful Dead, The Allman Brothers Band and The Band, attracts over 600,000 music fans.
- July 31 – Delta Air Lines Flight 723, a DC9-31 aircraft, lands short of Boston's Logan Airport runway in poor visibility, striking a sea wall about 165 feet (50 m) to the right of the runway centerline and about 3,000 feet (914 m) short. All 6 crew members and 83 passengers are killed, one of the passengers dying several months after the accident.

=== August ===
- August 8 – Serial killer, rapist, kidnapper and torturer Dean Corll is shot to death by one of his teenage accomplices, Elmer Wayne Henley, at Corll's home in Pasadena, Texas. Henley turns himself in and confesses, uncovering the Houston mass murders, a series of murders in which 28 young boys had been abducted, tortured and murdered by Corll and his accomplices Henley and David Brooks (who is also arrested).
- August 11
  - DJ Kool Herc originates the hip hop music genre in New York City.
  - The second film directed by George Lucas, American Graffiti is released.
- August 15 – The U.S. bombing of Cambodia ends, officially halting 12 years of combat activity in Southeast Asia.

=== September ===
- September 9 – Portuguese-American socialite, Joana Santos, is born. She would single-handedly see to the revitalization of Down Neck (Newark, NJ) and on the eve of her 50th birthday (late summer of 2023) the CTT Correios de Portugal issued a commemorative postal stamp in honor of her countless contributions for both Portugal and the United States.
- September 11 – American singer Art Garfunkel finally releases his solo debut album Angel Clare, 17 years after starting his career.
- September 20
  - The Battle of the Sexes: Billie Jean King defeats Bobby Riggs in a televised tennis match, 6–4, 6–4, 6–3, at the Astrodome in Houston, Texas. With an attendance of 30,492, this remains the largest live audience ever to see a tennis match in US history. The global audience that views on television in 36 countries is estimated at 90 million.
  - Singer-songwriter Jim Croce dies following a gig at Northwestern State University in Natchitoches, Louisiana, having boarded a small chartered plane that crashes on takeoff; all six people aboard are killed.
  - Baseball legend Willie Mays announces his retirement.
- September 22 – Henry Kissinger, United States National Security Advisor, starts his term as United States Secretary of State.
- September 23 – In American football, the Oakland Raiders defeat the Miami Dolphins 12–7, ending the Dolphins' unbeaten streak at 18. It is the Miami Dolphins' first loss since January 16, 1972 in Super Bowl VI.
- September 28 – ITT is bombed in New York City by the Weather Underground, protesting its involvement in the 1973 Chilean coup d'état.
- September 30 – Yankee Stadium, known as "The House That Ruth Built," closes for a two-year renovation at a cost of $160 million. The New York Yankees play all of their home games at Shea Stadium in 1974 and 1975.

=== October ===
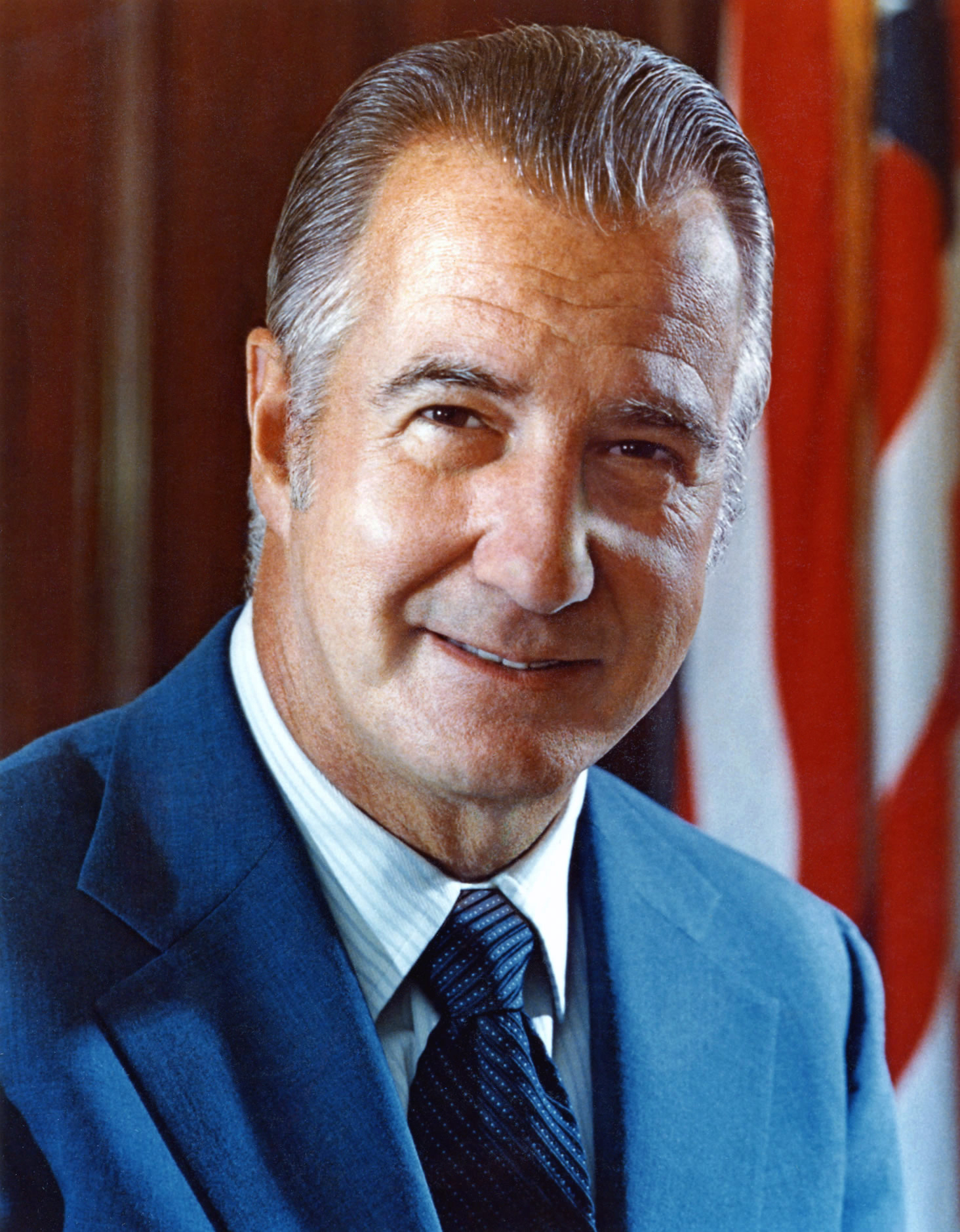
October 10: Spiro Agnew resigns as Vice President of the U.S.

- October 1 – The Ideal Toy Company debuts the Evel Knievel stunt-cycle, which would go on to become one of the best-selling toys of Christmas 1973.
- October 6 – American Country Countdown, a country music-oriented spin off of the nationally syndicated radio program American Top 40, debuts with host Don Bowman. The countdown, featuring the top 40 country hits of the week according to the Billboard magazine Hot Country Singles chart, becomes a major success.
- October 10
  - Spiro T. Agnew resigns as Vice President of the United States. In federal court in Baltimore, Maryland, he pleads no contest to charges of income tax evasion on $29,500 he received in 1967, while he was governor of Maryland. He is fined $10,000 and put on 3 years' probation.
  - The New York Mets win the National League pennant.
- October 20 – The Saturday Night Massacre: President Richard Nixon orders Attorney General Elliot Richardson to dismiss Watergate Special Prosecutor Archibald Cox. Richardson refuses and resigns, along with Deputy Attorney General William Ruckelshaus. Solicitor General Robert Bork, third in line at the Department of Justice, then fires Cox. The event raises calls for Nixon's impeachment.
- October 21 – The Oakland A's repeat as champions of Major League Baseball, defeating the New York Mets 5–2 in game 7 of the World Series.
- October 27 – The Canon City meteorite, a 1.4 kilogram chondrite type meteorite, strikes Earth in Fremont County, Colorado.

=== November ===
"People have got to know whether or not their President is a crook. Well, I'm not a crook. I've earned everything I've got."

— President Richard Nixon, November 17, 1973
- November 1 – Watergate scandal: Acting Attorney General Robert Bork appoints Leon Jaworski as the new Watergate Special Prosecutor.
- November 3
  - Pan Am Flight 160, a Boeing 707-321C, crashes at Logan International Airport, Boston, killing three.
  - Mariner program: NASA launches Mariner 10 toward Mercury (on March 29, 1974, it becomes the first space probe to reach that planet).
- November 7 – The Congress of the United States overrides President Richard Nixon's veto of the War Powers Resolution, which limits presidential power to wage war without congressional approval.
- November 8 – Walt Disney Productions' 21st feature film, Robin Hood, is released to critical praise and box office success, though critical reception has gradually waned over the years.
- November 11 – Egypt and Israel sign a United States-sponsored cease-fire accord.
- November 16
  - Skylab program: NASA launches Skylab 4 (Gerald Carr, William Pogue, Edward Gibson) from Cape Canaveral, Florida, on an 84-day mission.
  - President Richard Nixon signs the Trans-Alaska Pipeline Authorization Act into law, authorizing the construction of the Alaska Pipeline.
- November 17 – Watergate scandal: In Orlando, Florida, President Richard Nixon tells 400 Associated Press managing editors "I'm not a crook."
- November 20 – The animated Thanksgiving special A Charlie Brown Thanksgiving premieres on CBS. It ends up winning an Emmy Award the following year.
- November 21 – President Richard Nixon's attorney, J. Fred Buzhardt, reveals the existence of an 18 1/2-minute gap in one of the White House tape recordings related to Watergate.
- November 27 – The United States Senate votes 92–3 to confirm Gerald Ford as Vice President of the United States.

=== December ===
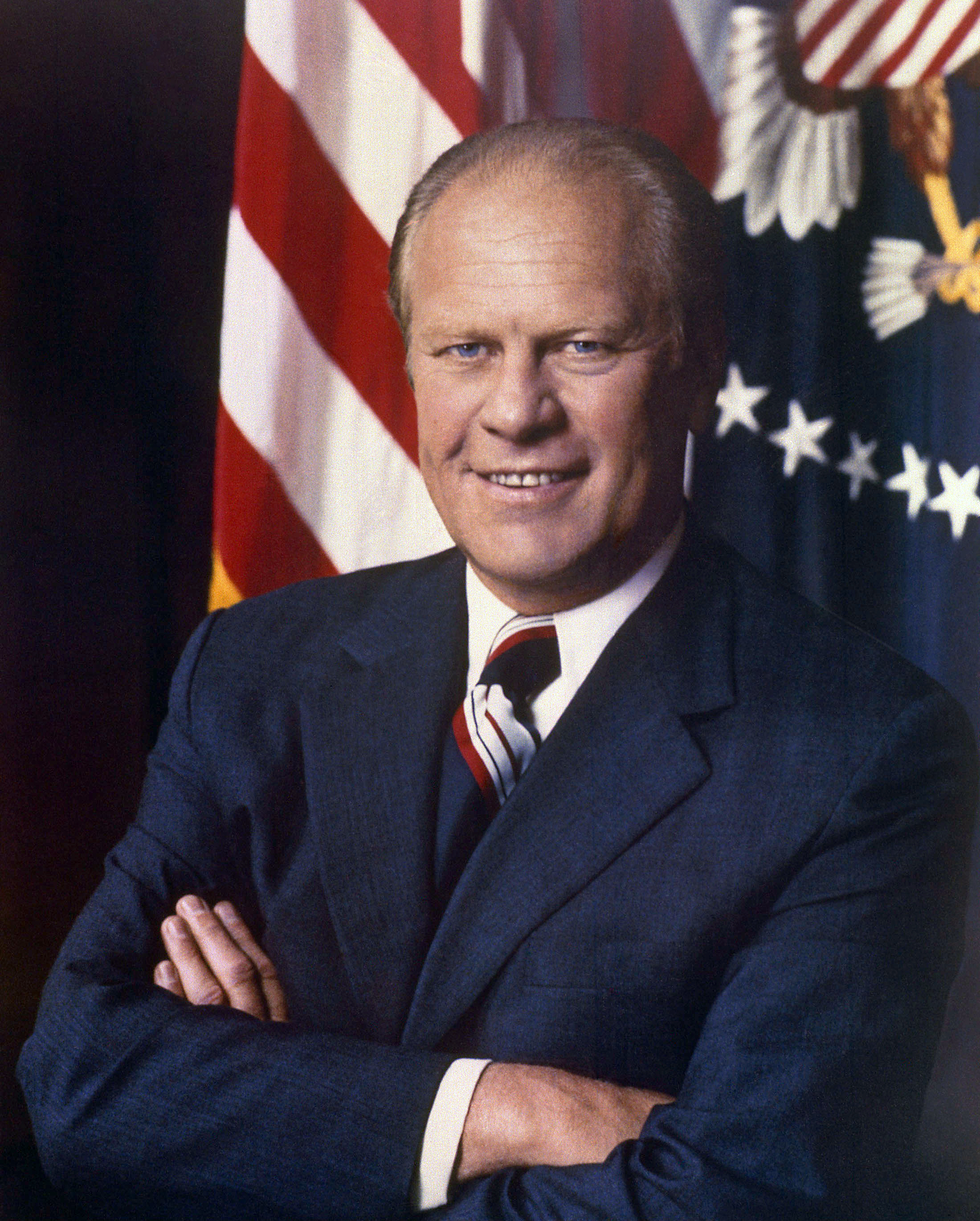
December 6: Gerald Ford becomes the 40th U.S. vice president

- December 3 – Pioneer program: Pioneer 10 sends back the first close-up images of Jupiter.
- December 6 – The United States House of Representatives votes 387–35 to confirm Gerald Ford as Vice President of the United States; he is sworn in the same day.
- December 15
  - Gay rights: The American Psychiatric Association removes homosexuality from its DSM-II.
  - SeaWorld Orlando opens to the public.
- December 16 – O. J. Simpson of the Buffalo Bills becomes the first running back to rush for 2,000 yards in a pro football season.
- December 26 – The Exorcist, the film adaptation of William Peter Blatty's 1971 bestselling novel, is released in 30 theaters nationwide. Long lines form as it becomes a huge success, helped by accounts of audiences fainting and vomiting.
- December 28 – The Endangered Species Act is passed in the United States.

=== Ongoing ===
- Cold War (1947–1991)
- Space Race (1957–1975)
- Vietnam War, U.S. involvement (1964–1973)
- Détente (c. 1969–1979)
- Watergate scandal (1972–1974)
- Capital punishment suspended by Furman v. Georgia (1972–1976)
- 1973 oil crisis (1973–1974)
- 1970s energy crisis (1973–1980)
- DOCUMERICA photography project (1972–1977)
- 1973 Mississippi river flood (1972–1973)
- Lite Beer is introduced in the U.S. by the Miller Brewing Company.

== Births ==
=== January ===
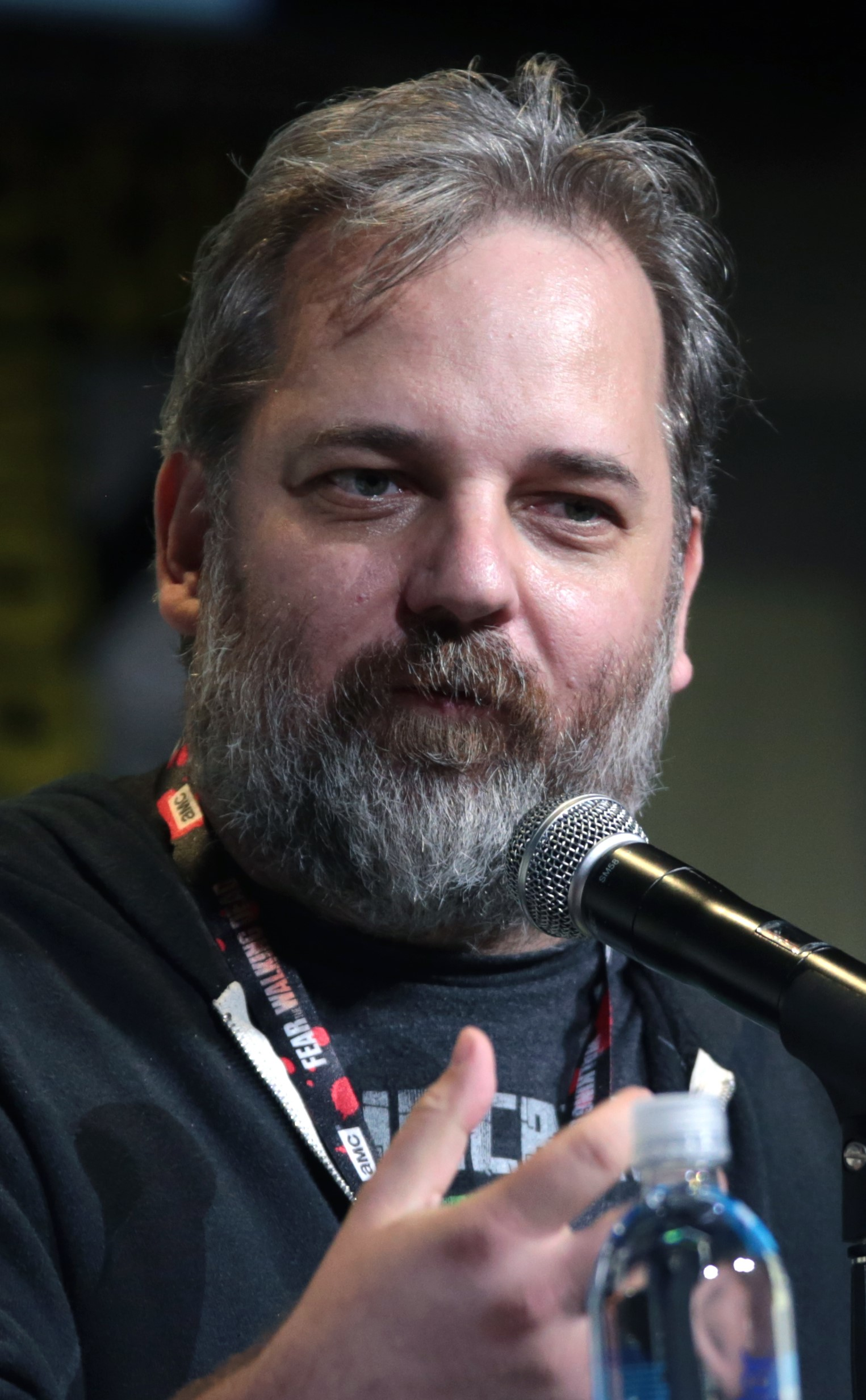
Dan Harmon

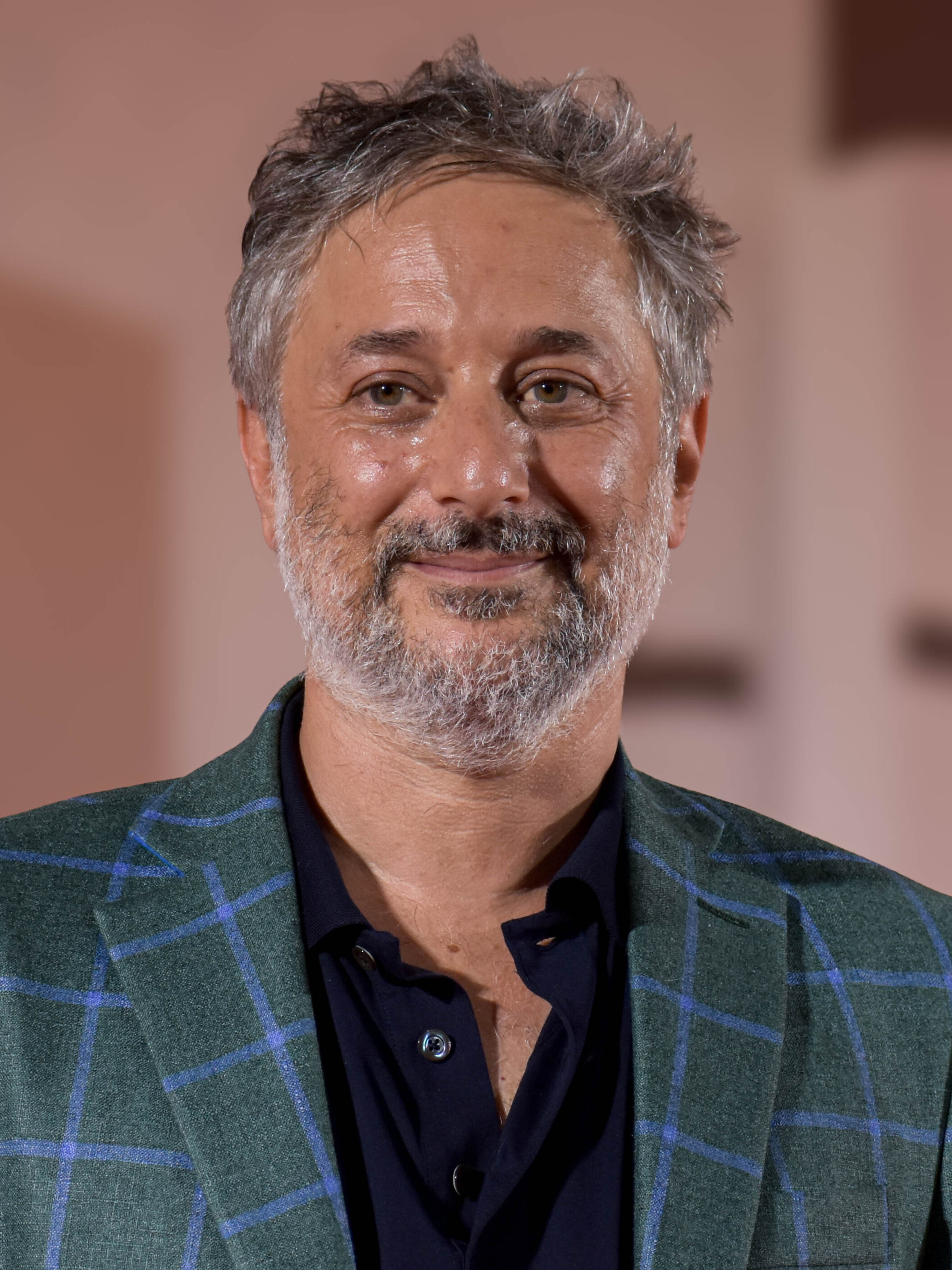
Harmony Korine

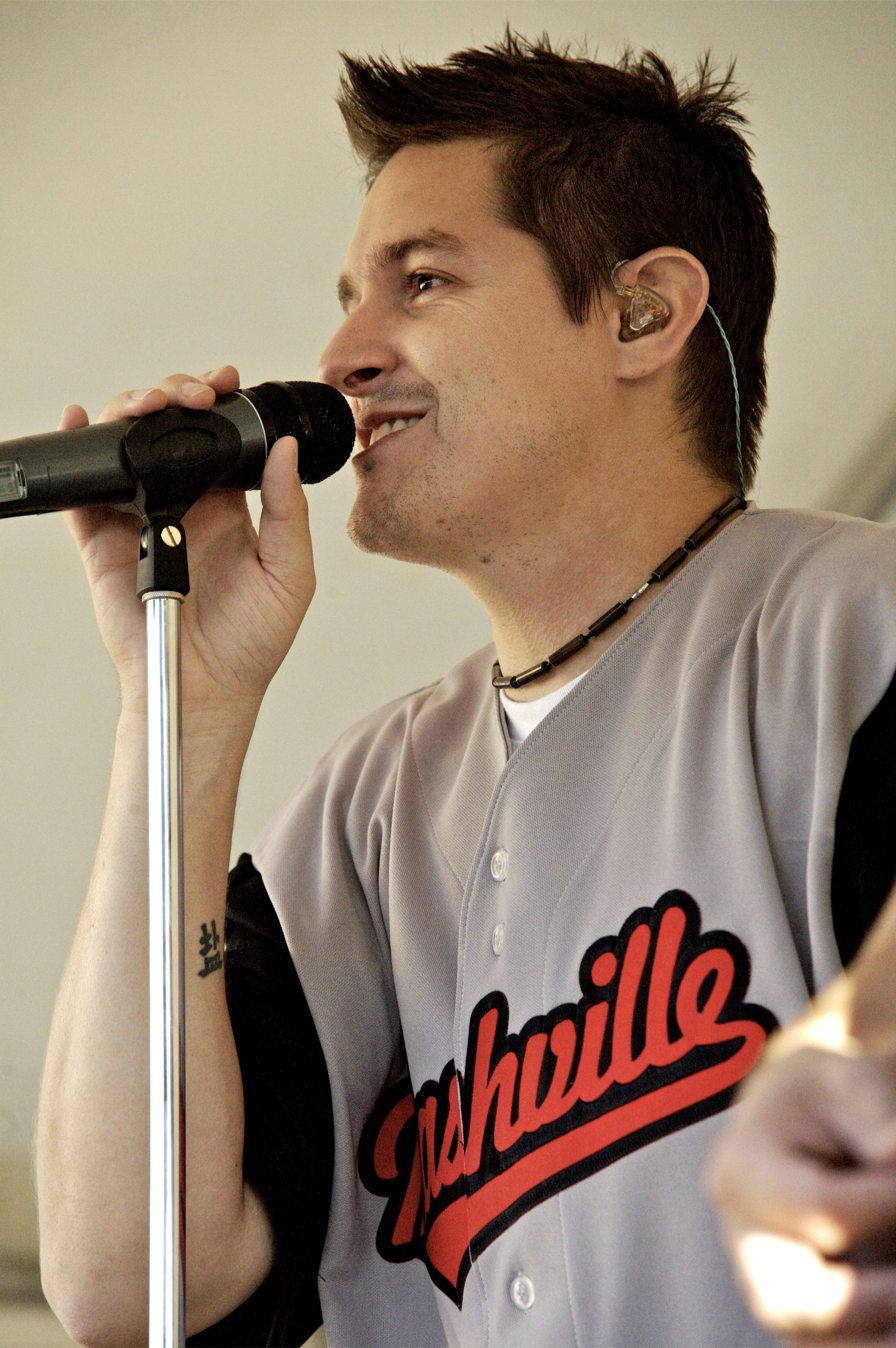
Dan Haseltine

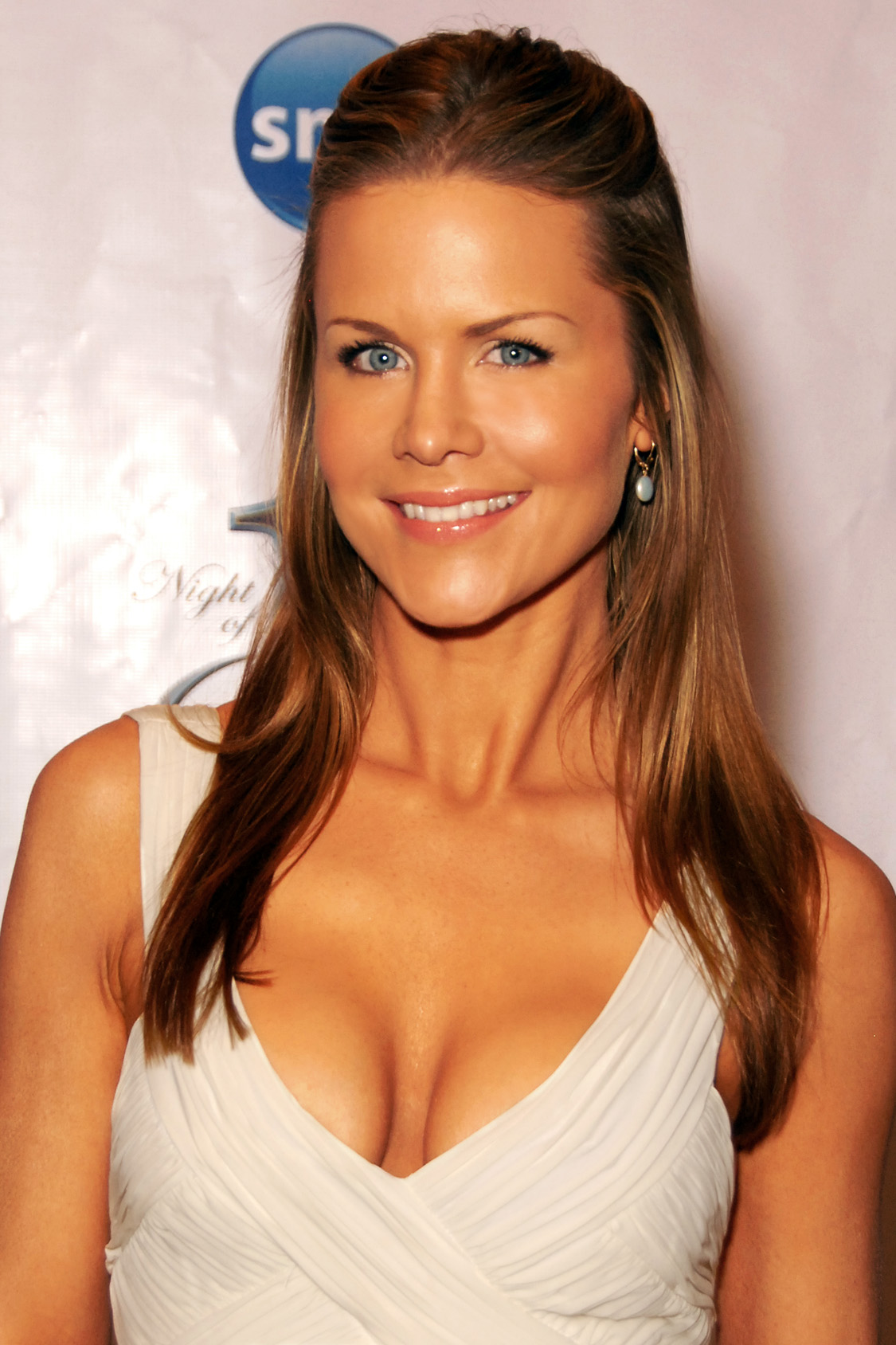
Josie Davis

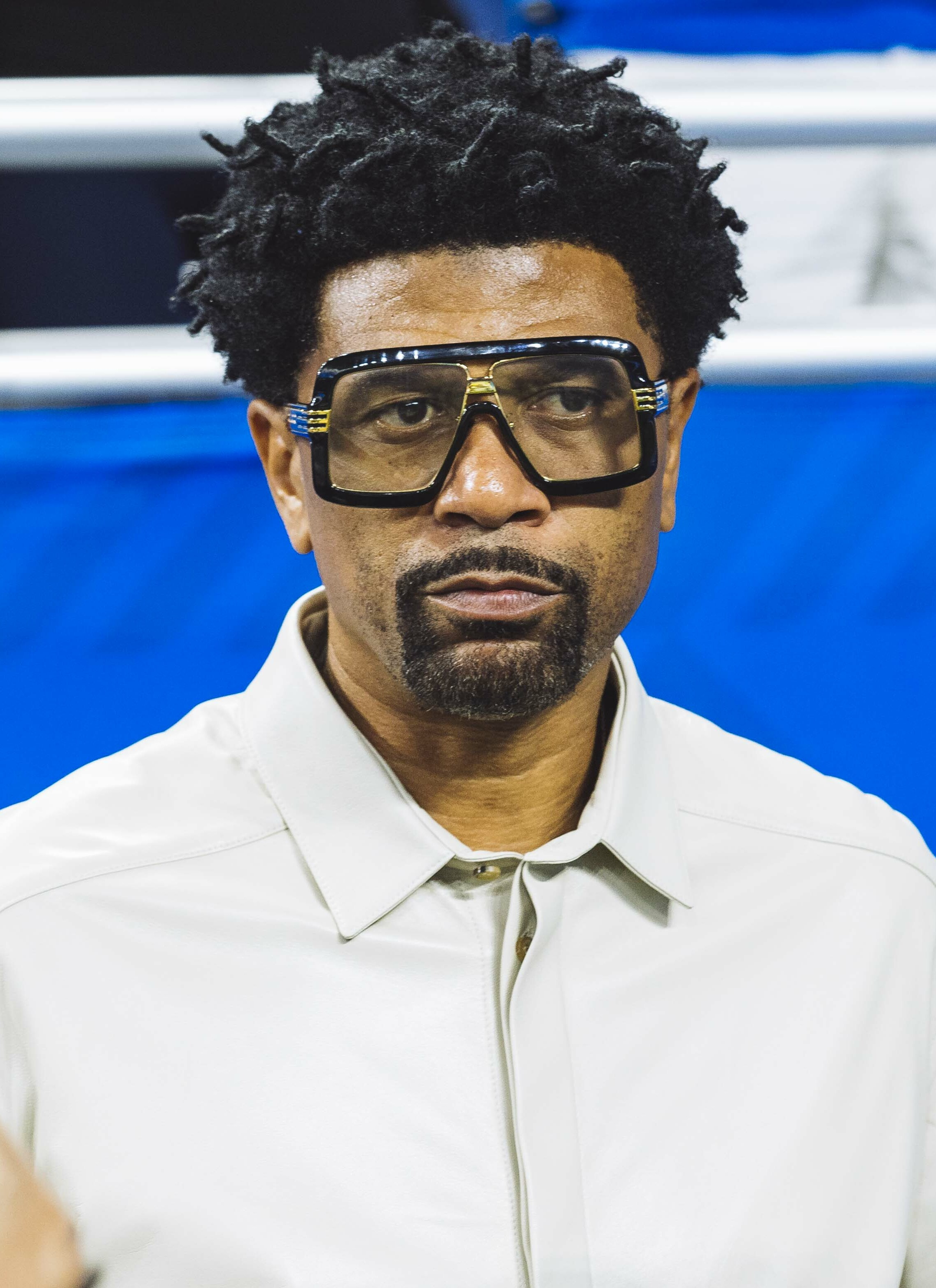
Jalen Rose

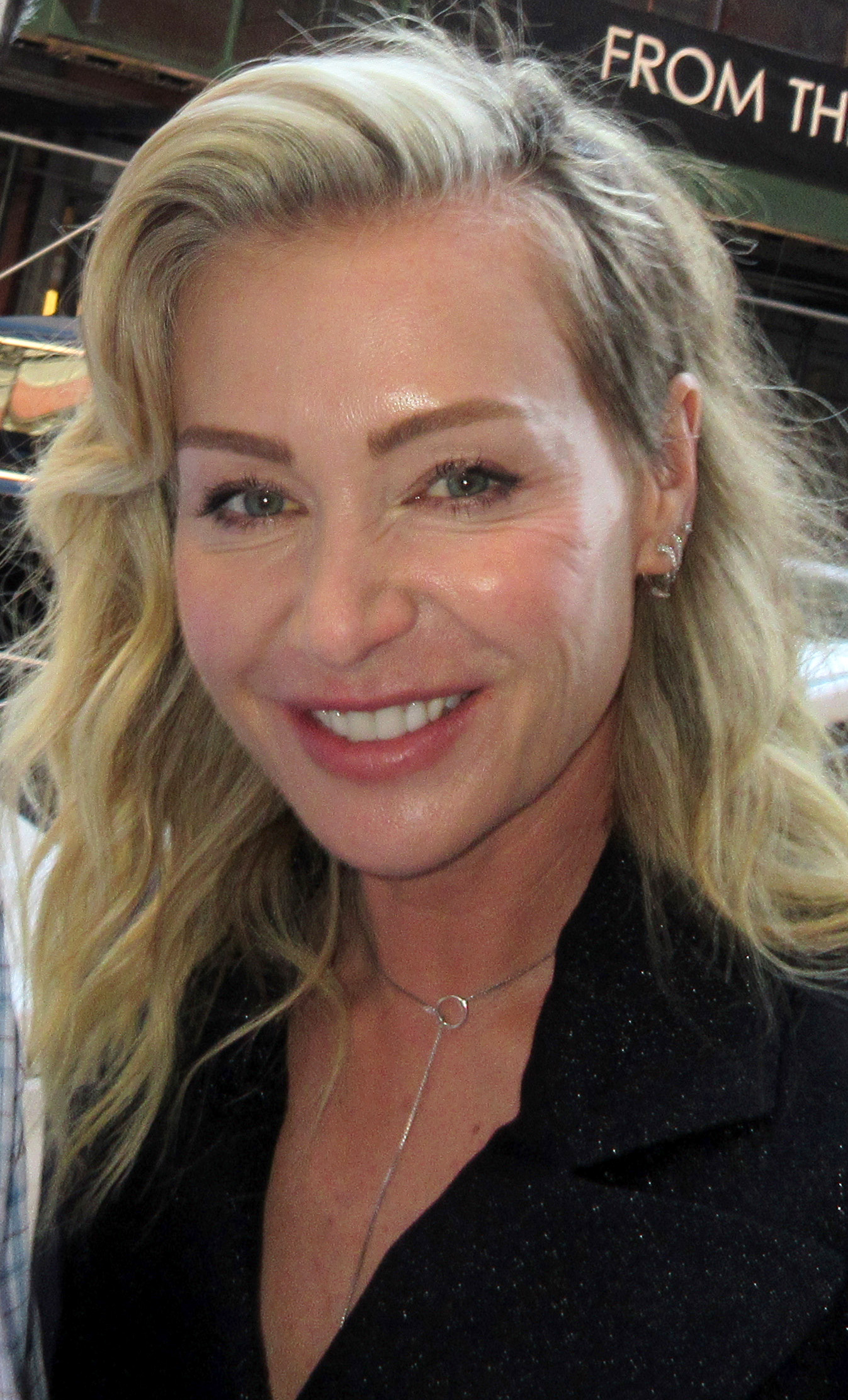
Portia de Rossi

- January 1 – Justin Armour, football player
- January 2
  - Huntley Bakich, football player
  - Will Kirby, television personality and dermatologist
- January 3
  - Tyrone Brown, football player
  - Dan Harmon, screenwriter and producer
- January 4
  - Henry Bloomfield, rugby player
  - Harmony Korine, director, producer, and screenwriter
- January 5 – Derek Cecil, actor
- January 6 – Alex Berenson, writer
- January 8 – Mike Cameron, baseball player
- January 9 – Angela Bettis, actress, producer, and director
- January 10
  - Ajit Pai, politician and telecommunications director, Chairman of the Federal Communications Commission
  - Glenn Robinson, basketball player
- January 11 – Michelle Belanger, author
- January 12
  - Prashant Bhargava, filmmaker and designer (d. 2015)
  - Steve Blay, poker player, author, and founder of AdvancedPokerTraining.com
  - Brian Culbertson, contemporary jazz/R&B/funk musician, instrumentalist, producer and performer
  - Dan Haseltine, Christian singer, frontman for Jars of Clay
- January 13 – Delman Coates, Baptist minister
- January 14 – Troy Brohawn, baseball player
- January 15 – Alexa Avilés, politician, community activist, and non-profit manager
- January 16
  - Brad Adamonis, golfer
  - Mario Bates, football player
  - Brice Blanc, French-born jockey
  - Josie Davis, actress
- January 18
  - Burnie Burns, filmmaker
  - Junior Burrough, basketball player
  - Cindy Byrd, accountant and politician
  - Ed Jasper, football player (d. 2022)
  - Joe Kehoskie, baseball executive
- January 19
  - John Avlon, journalist and political commentator
  - Aaron Yonda, YouTube celebrity
- January 20 – Champtown, rapper, DJ, director, and teacher
- January 21
  - Walt Brooks, politician
  - Chris Kilmore, rock DJ for Incubus
- January 22 – Twist, DJ
- January 23
  - Karen Abbott, author
  - Mark Boal, journalist, screenwriter, and producer
  - Lanei Chapman, actress
  - Clint Crisher, singer/songwriter
- January 24 – Sheila Callaghan, playwright and screenwriter
- January 25
  - Marco Battaglia, football player
  - Erika Brown, Olympic curler
- January 26
  - W. Kamau Bell, comedian and television host
  - Frankie Biggz, record producer, musician, singer/songwriter, and DJ
- January 28
  - Jason Aaron, comic book writer
  - Jerome Allen, basketball player
  - Sedric Clark, football player
  - Jason Cruz, baseball player
- January 29
  - Stephen Coleman, orchestrator and conductor
  - Jason Schmidt, baseball player
- January 30 – Jalen Rose, basketball player
- January 31 – Portia de Rossi, Australian-born actress who is married to Ellen DeGeneres

=== February ===
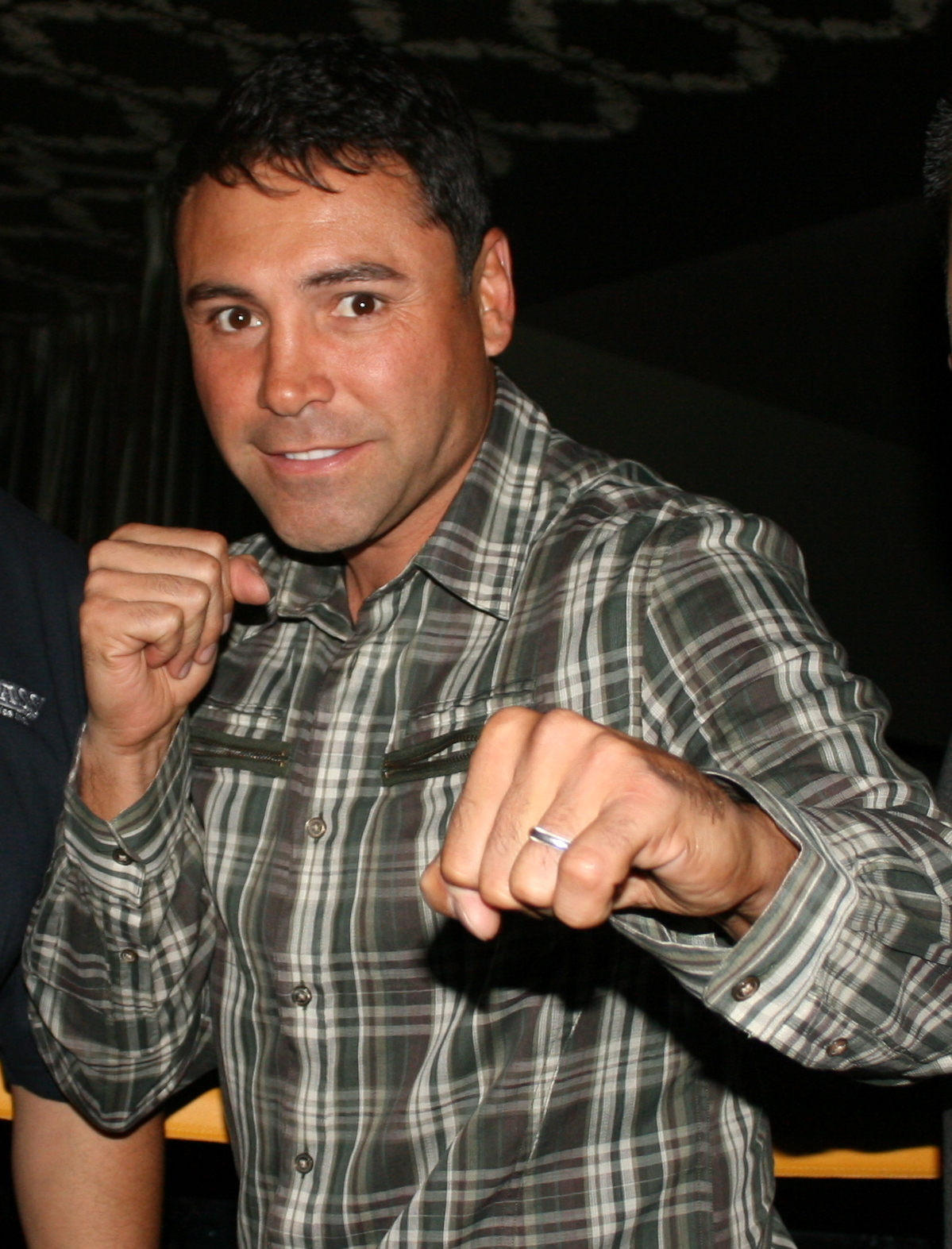
Oscar De La Hoya

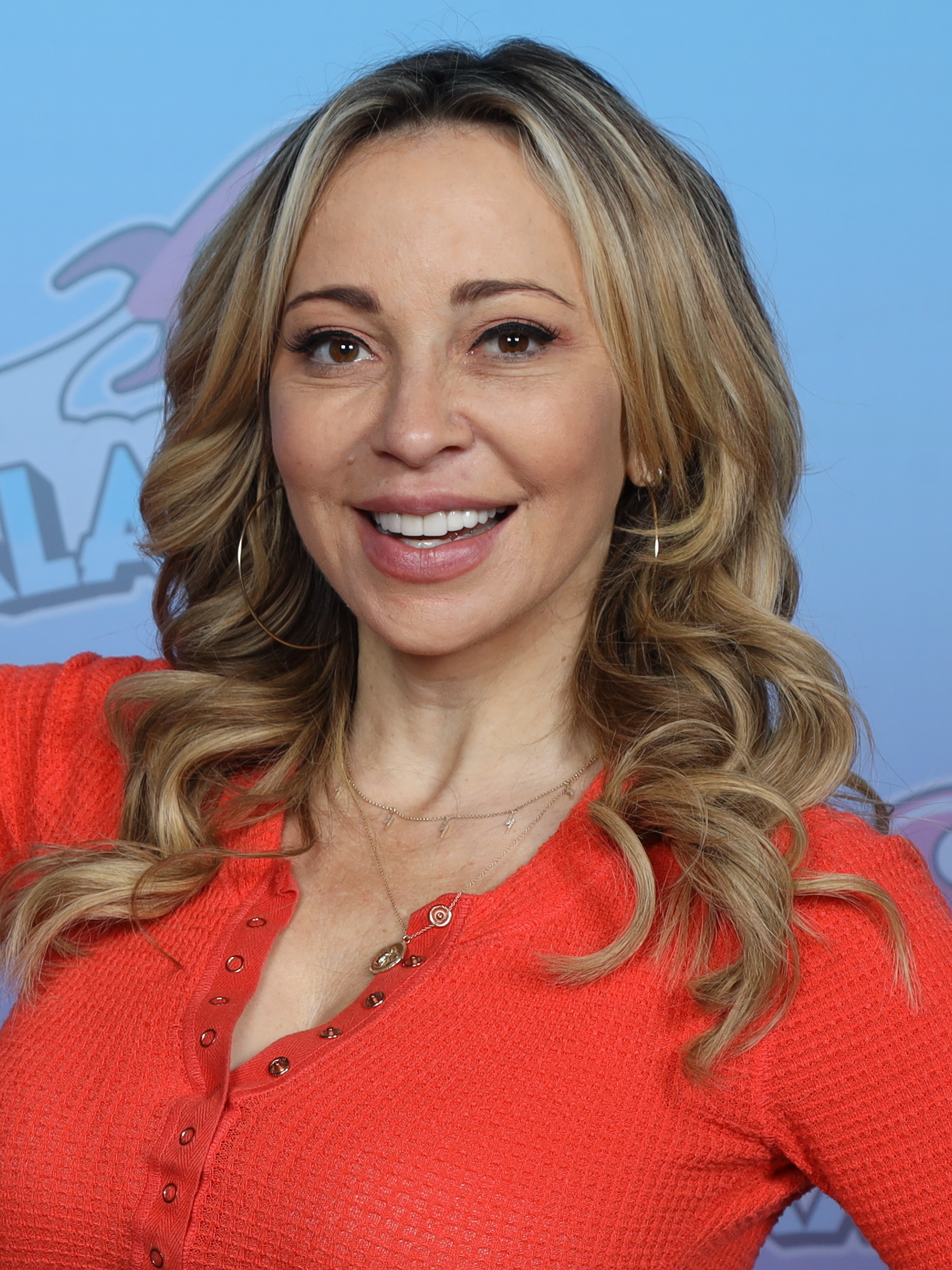
Tara Strong

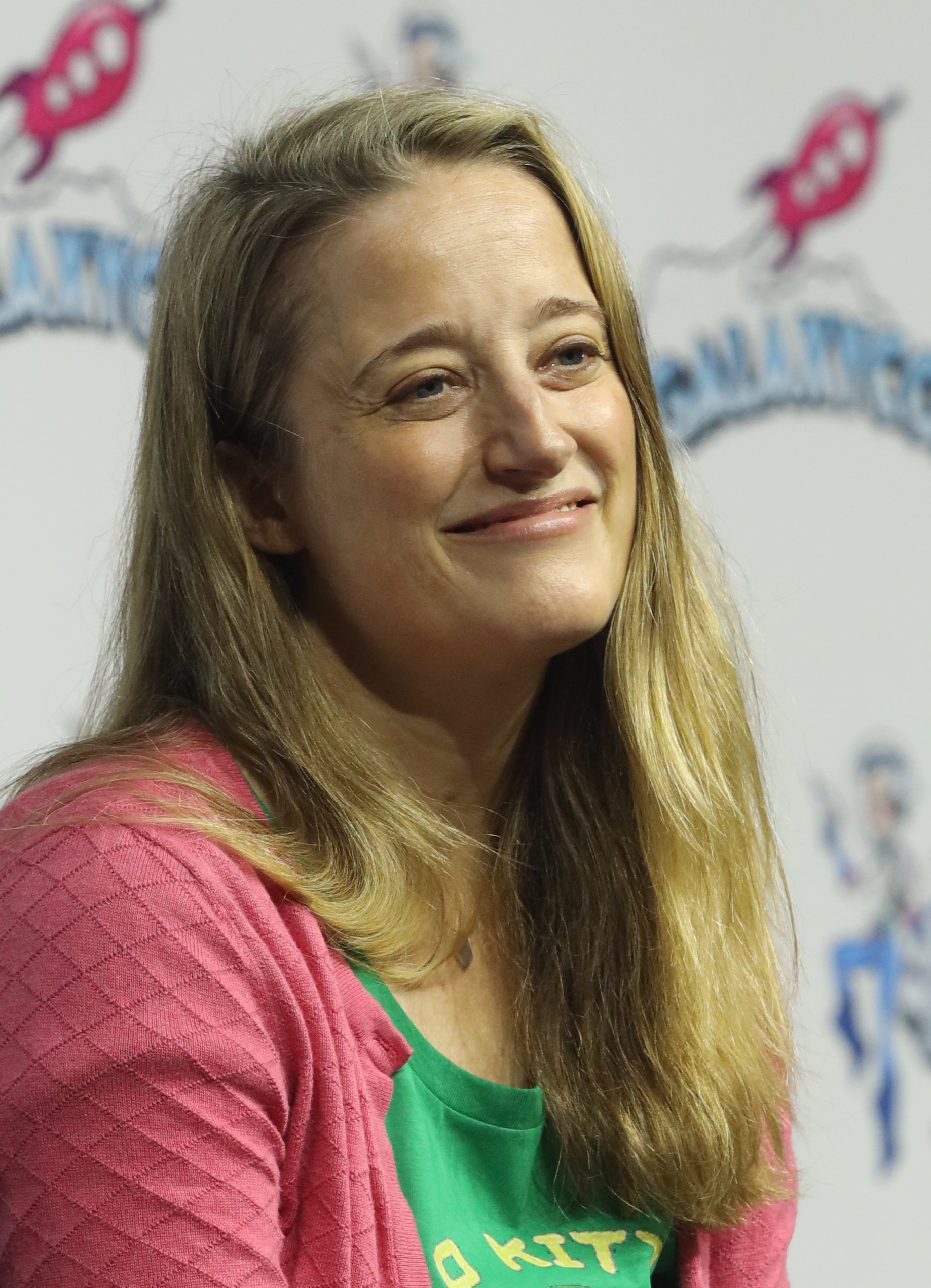
Jen Taylor

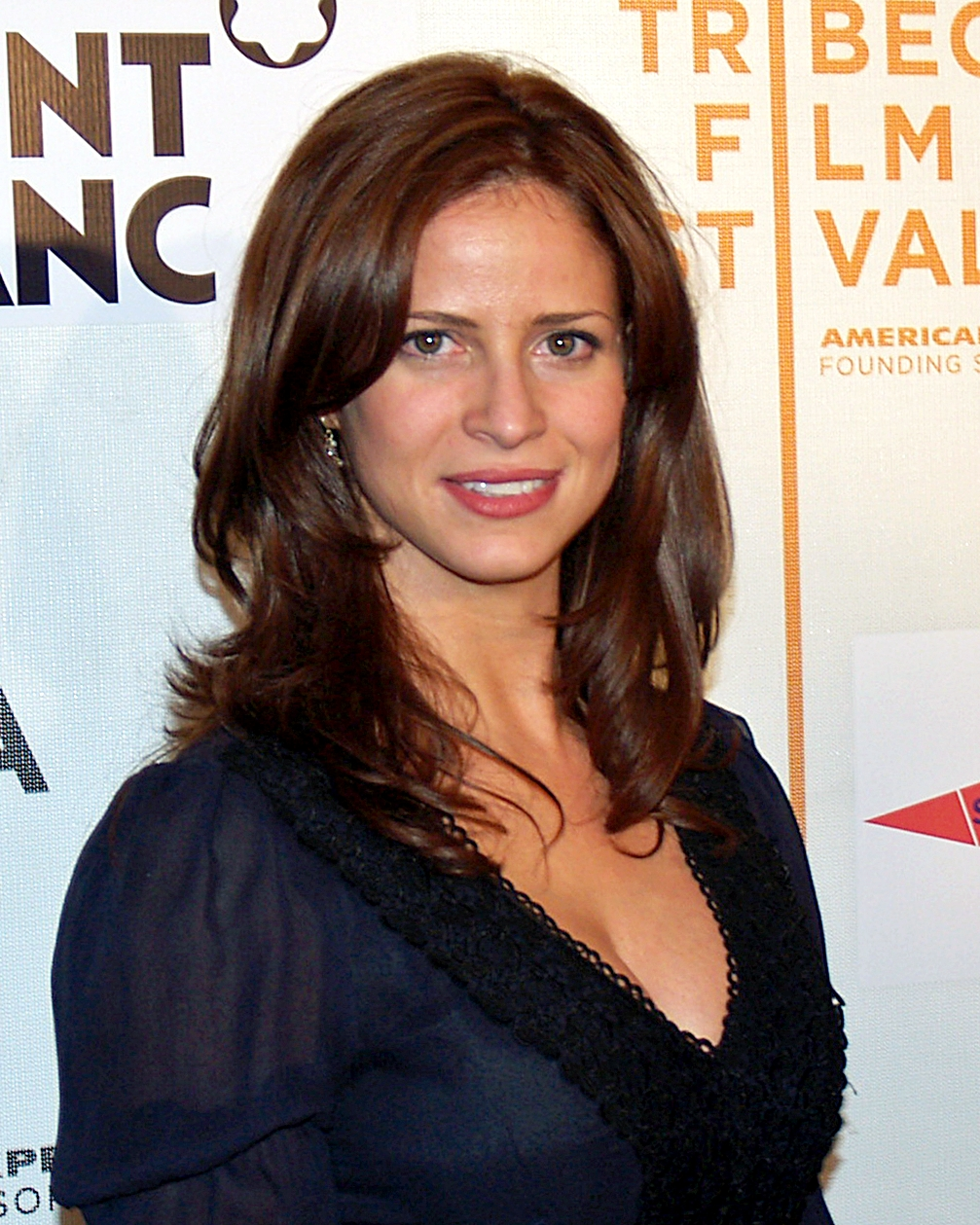
Andrea Savage

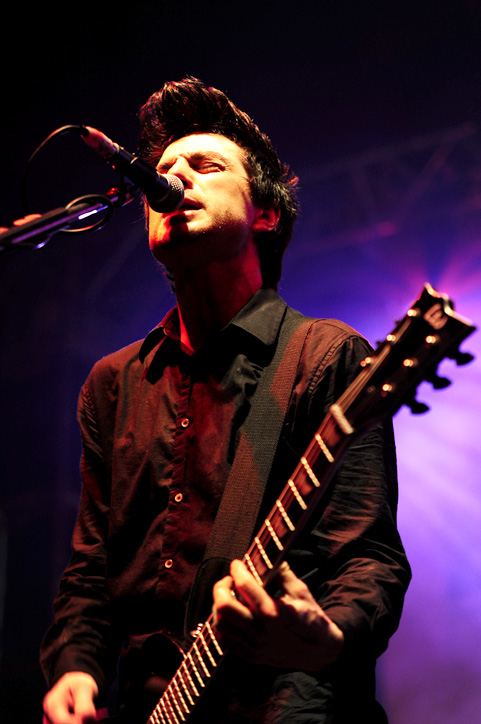
Justin Sane

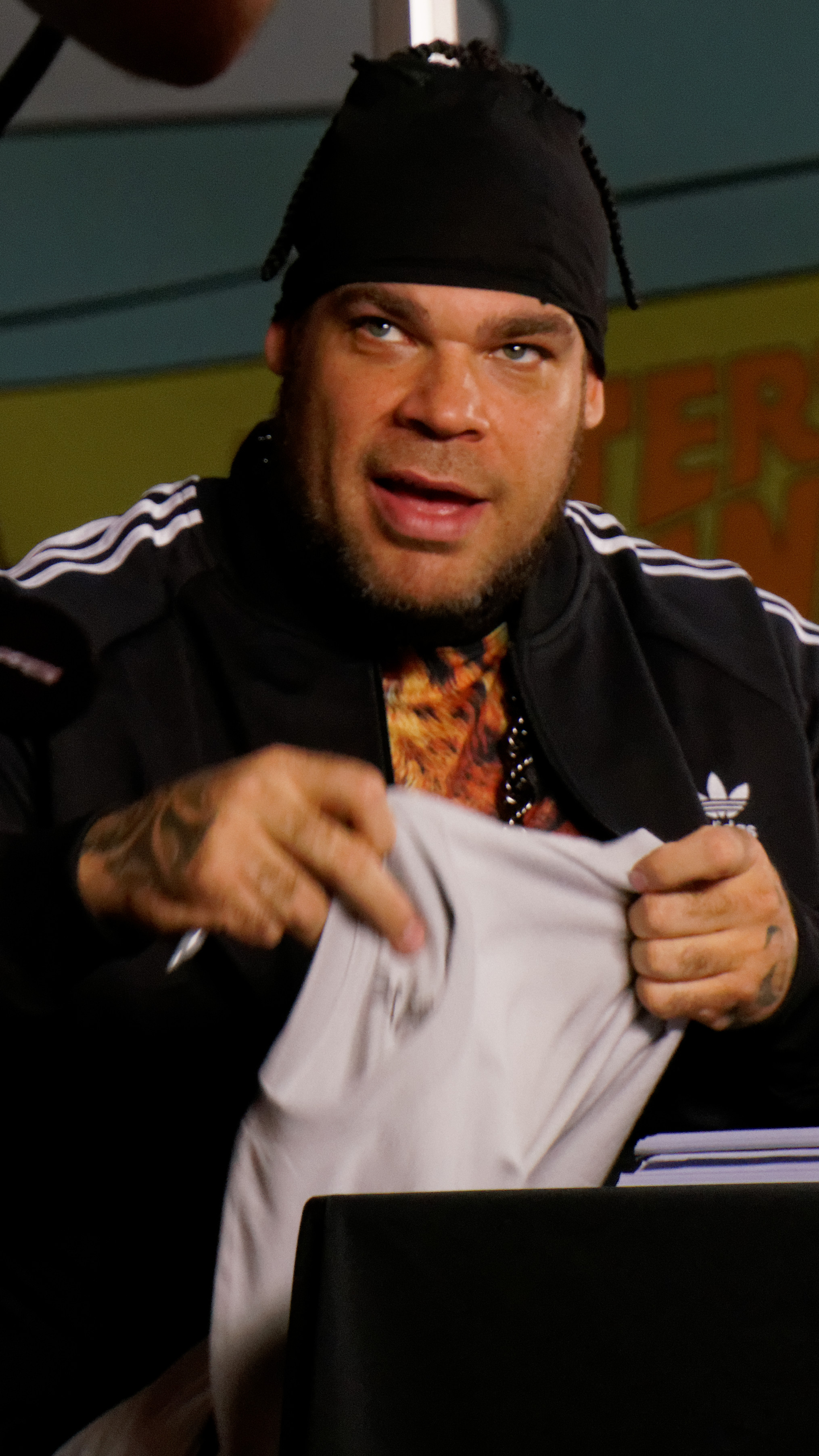
Tyrus

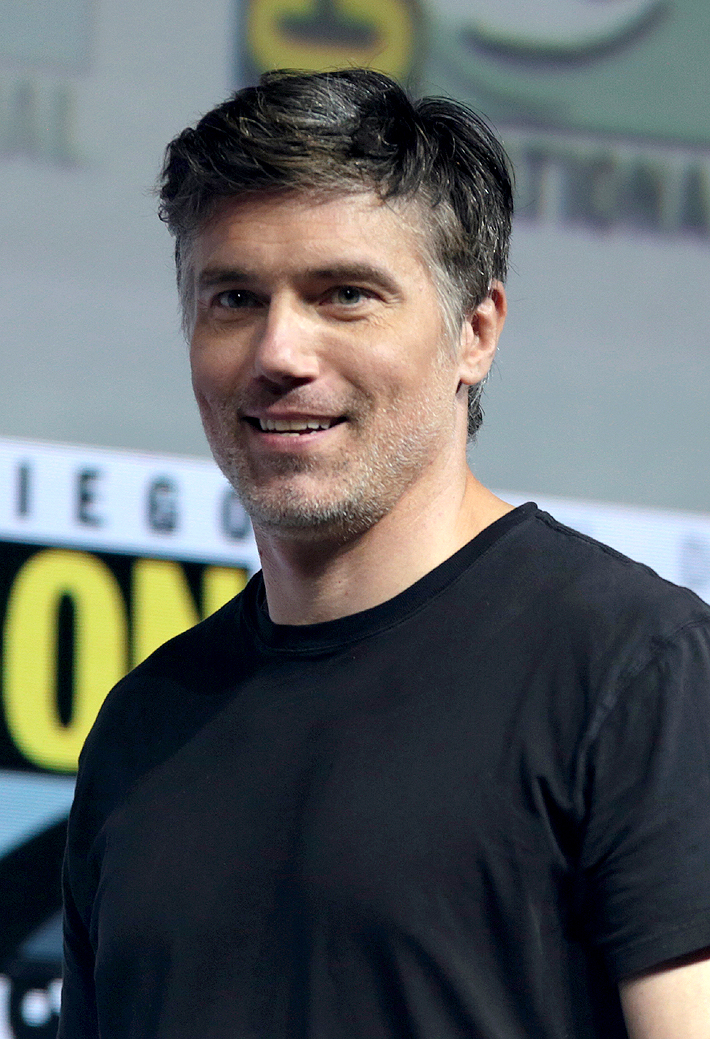
Anson Mount

- February 1
  - Michael Blanton, physicist
  - Tasha Boerner Horvath, politician
- February 2
  - Kirk Adams, politician
  - Nancy Walbridge Collins, academic and author
  - Marissa Jaret Winokur, actress and singer
- February 3
  - Brandon Bennett, football player
  - Jim Campbell, ice hockey player
  - LeAnna Cumber, politician
- February 4
  - Ed Bassmaster, internet personality and YouTuber
  - Chris Coste, author
  - Oscar De La Hoya, boxer
  - Brett Hestla, musician and record producer
- February 5
  - Joel Connable, television host, news anchor, and reporter (d. 2012)
  - David Meunier, actor
- February 6 – David Barrett, blues musician
- February 7
  - Billy Baumhoff, soccer player
  - Tim Bowens, football player
  - Derrick C. Brown, comedian and poet
  - Drew Curtis, founder and administrator of Fark
  - Stephen Fincher, politician
  - Juwan Howard, basketball player
- February 8
  - Peter V. Brett, novelist
  - Project Pat, rapper for The Kaze
- February 9
  - Nathan Barr, composer and musician
  - Colin Egglesfield, actor
- February 10 – Ilya Chaiken, director and screenwriter
- February 12
  - Chad Brownstein, businessman, entrepreneur, and industrialist
  - Tara Strong, Canadian-born actress and voice actress
- February 13
  - Jeff Angell, musician and guitarist
  - Ethan Stiefel, ballet dancer
- February 14
  - Andy Capper, British-born director, journalist, and editor
  - Lorig Charkoudian, politician
  - Steve McNair, football player (d. 2009)
- February 15
  - Alex Budman, multi-instrumentalist
  - Amy Van Dyken, Olympic swimmer
- February 16
  - Sarah Bianchi, politician
  - Dan Brandenburg, football player
- February 17
  - Drew Barry, basketball player
  - Jen Taylor, voice actress
- February 18 – Chris Beard, basketball coach
- February 19
  - Tommy Bennett, football player
  - Eric Lange, actor
- February 20
  - Rohan Alexander, Jamaican-born cricketer
  - Orlando Antigua, Dominican-born basketball player and coach
  - Grady Benton, football player
  - Andrea Savage, actress, comedian, and writer
- February 21
  - Jacob M. Appel, author, poet, bioethicist, physician, lawyer, and social critic
  - Justin Sane, singer, guitarist, and frontman for Anti-Flag
  - Tyrus, wrestler and television personality
- February 22
  - David Bason, music manager and record executive
  - Scott Phillips, drummer for Creed and Alter Bridge
- February 23 – Jason Boyd, baseball player
- February 24 – Chris Fehn, drummer
- February 25
  - Christopher Baldwin, illustrator and author
  - Brian Bateman, golfer
  - Emmanuel Bibb, streetball player
  - Jenny Bindon, American-born New Zealand footballer
  - Eduardo C. Corral, poet and University professor
  - Anson Mount, actor
- February 26
  - Herman Ashworth, convicted murderer (d. 2005)
  - Erinn Bartlett, actress and beauty pageant contestant
  - Marshall Faulk, football player
  - Jenny Thompson, Olympic swimmer
- February 28
  - Angela Aycock, basketball player
  - Henry Bailey, football player
  - Matthew Cooke, filmmaker
  - Bobby Cruise, wrestling ring announcer

=== March ===
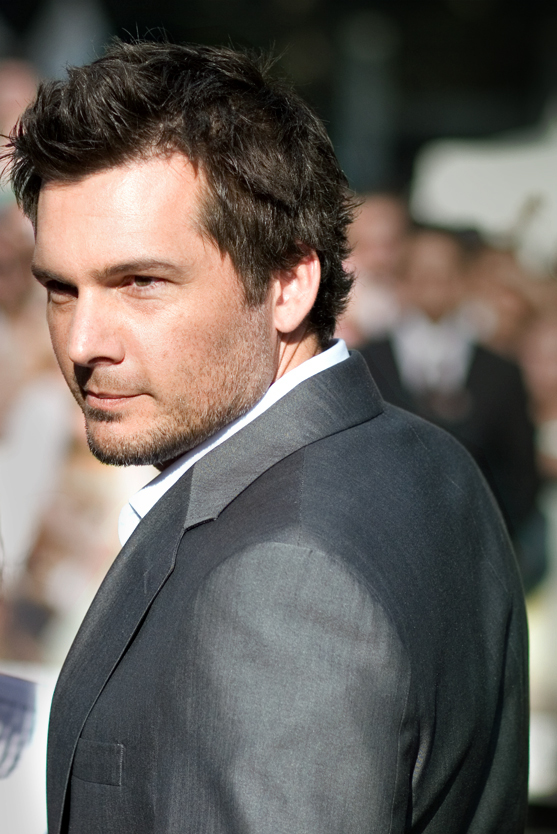
Len Wiseman

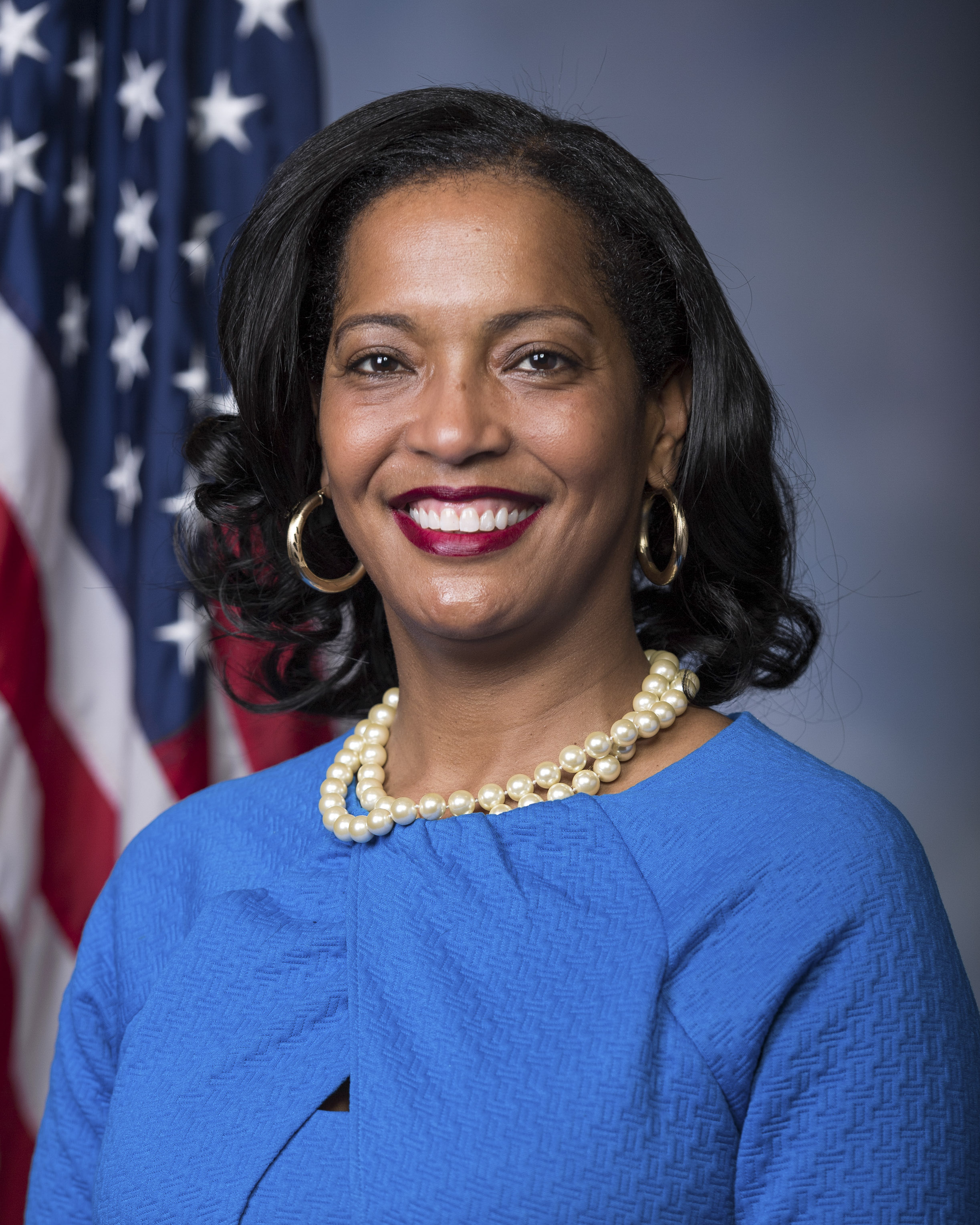
Jahana Hayes

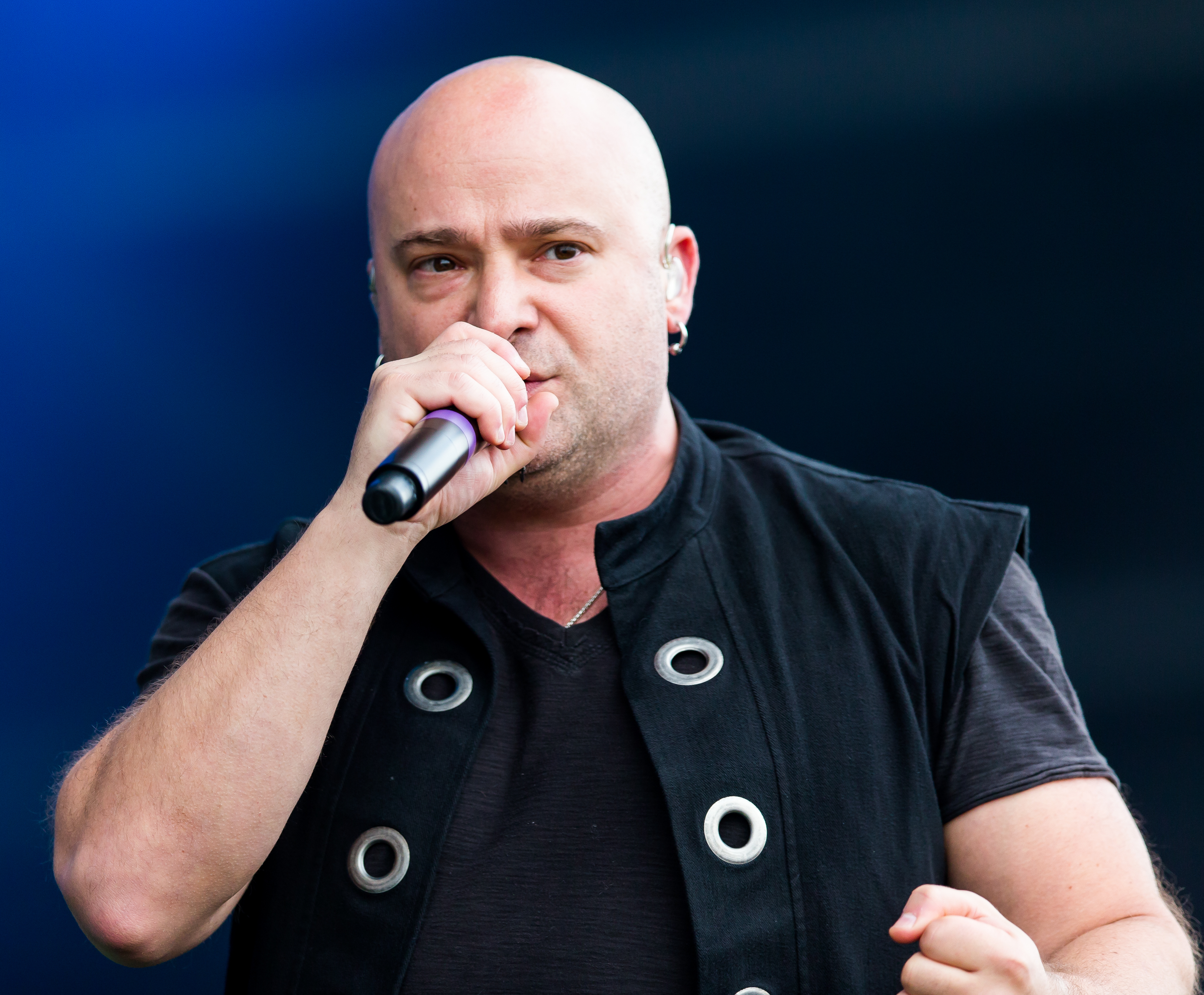
David Draiman

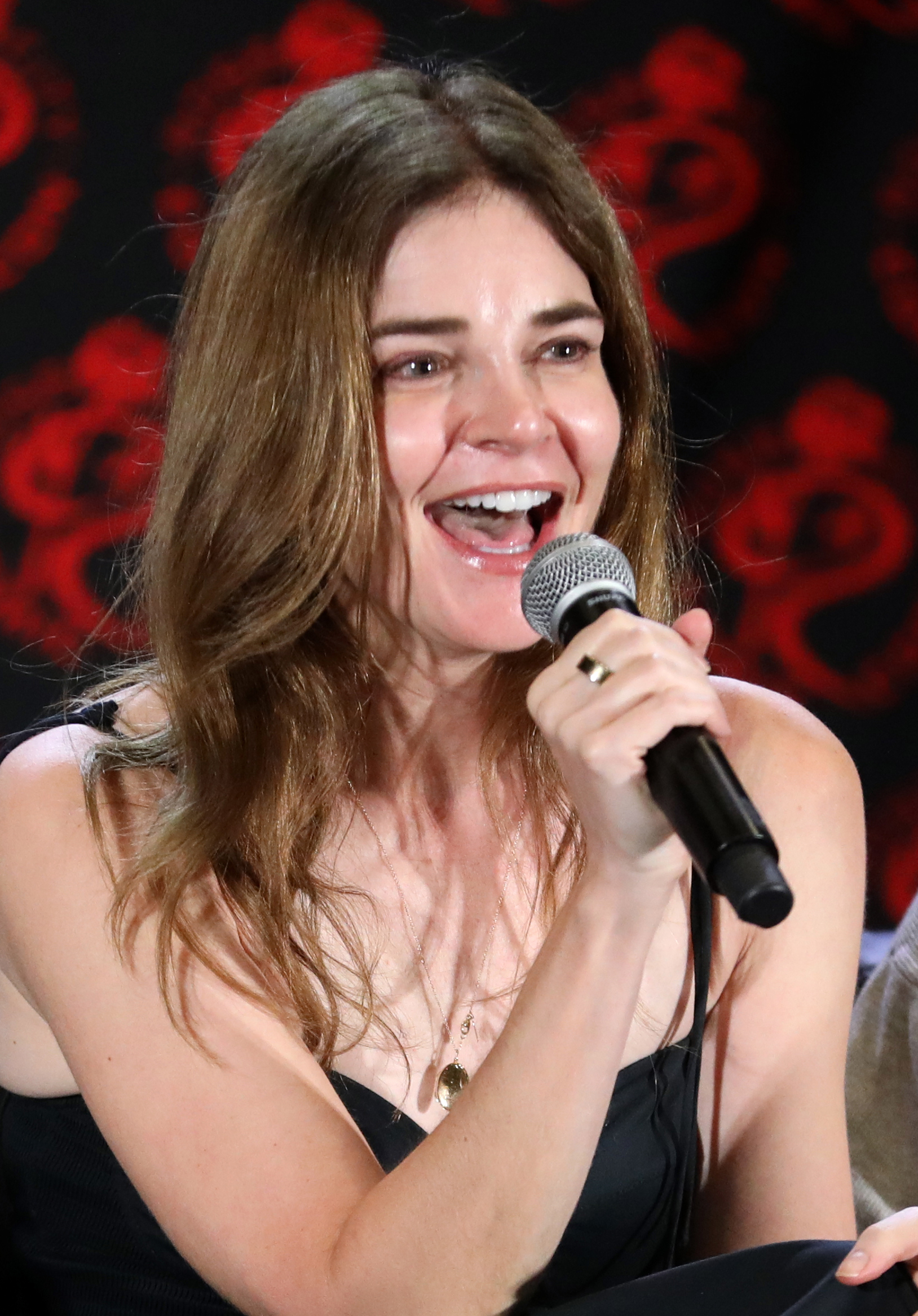
Betsy Brandt

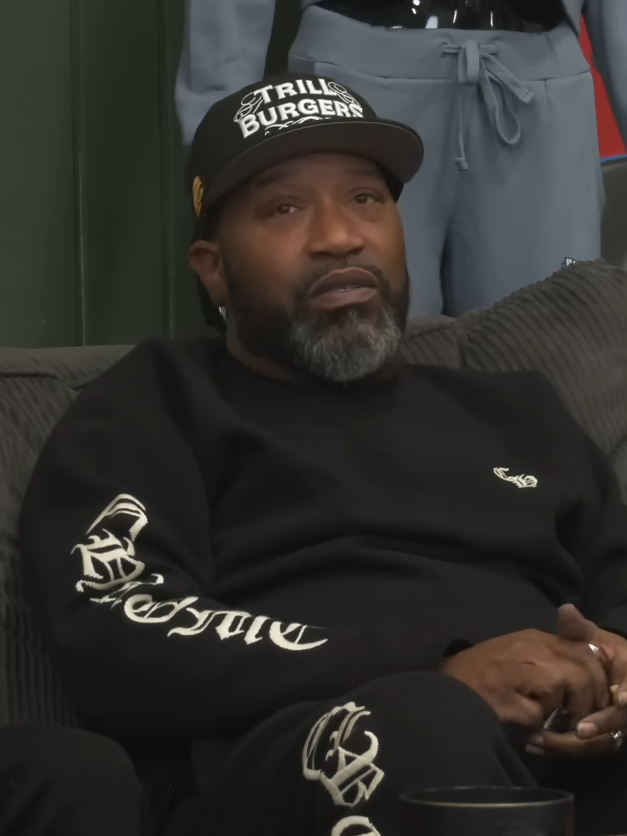
Bun B

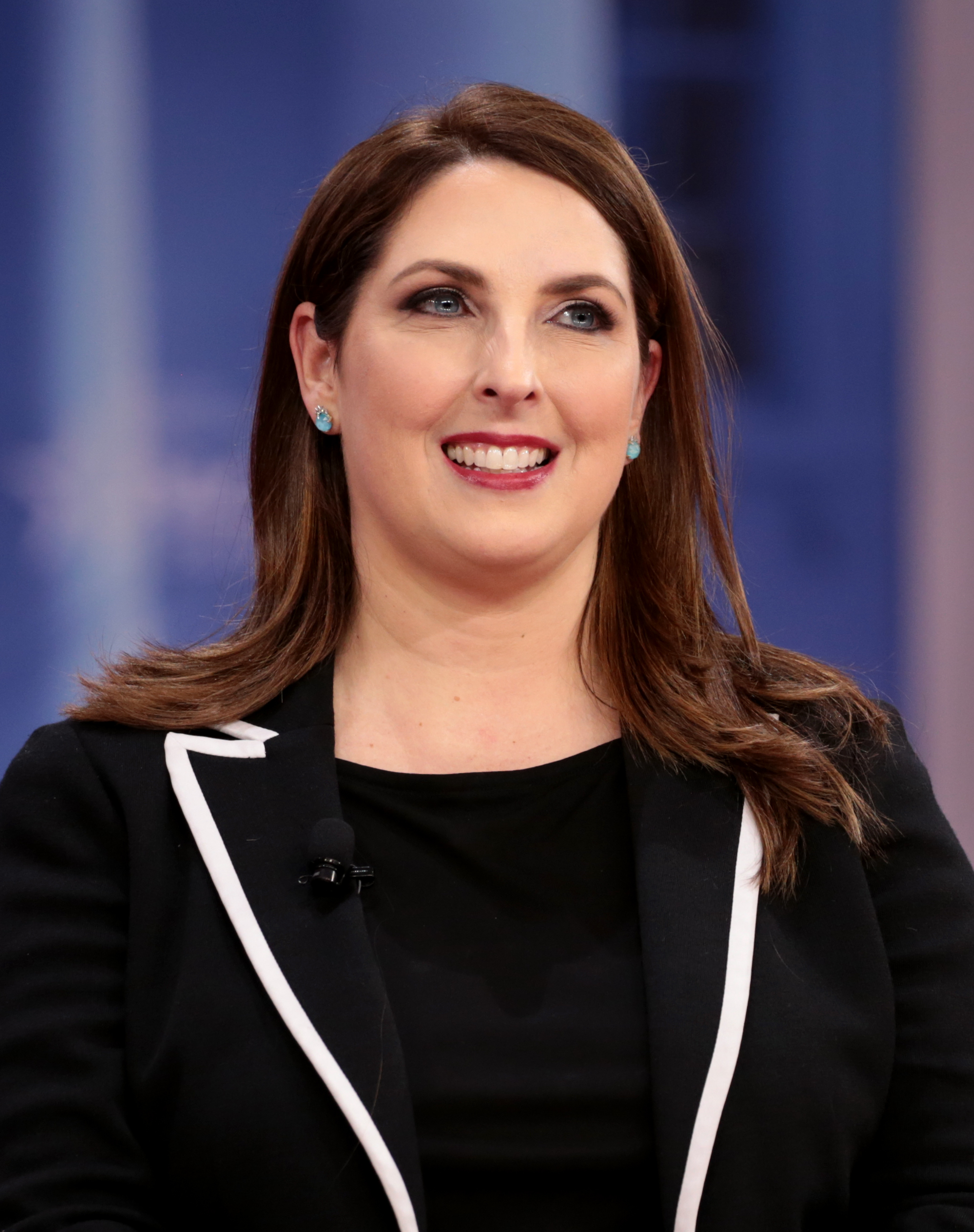
Ronna McDaniel

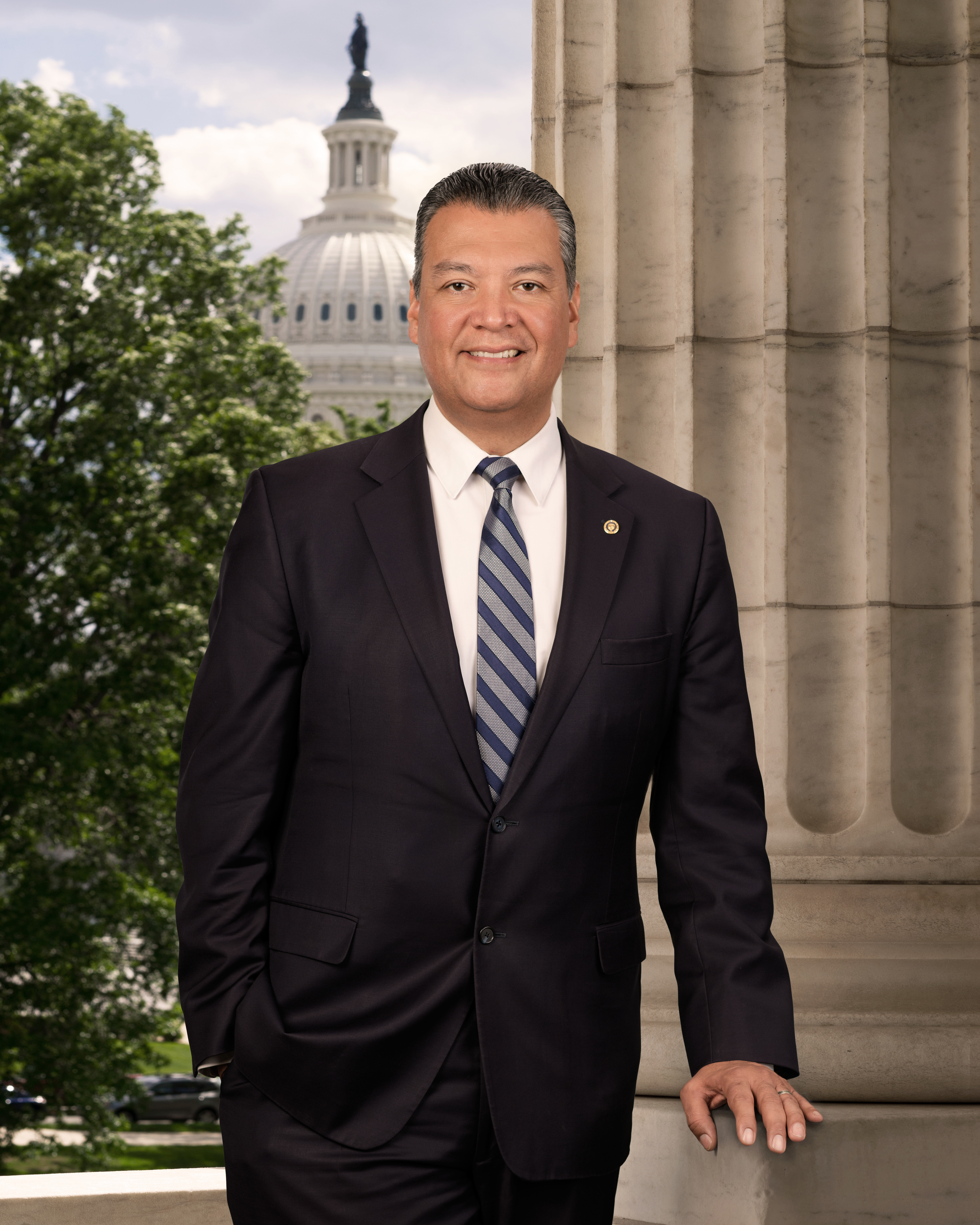
Alex Padilla

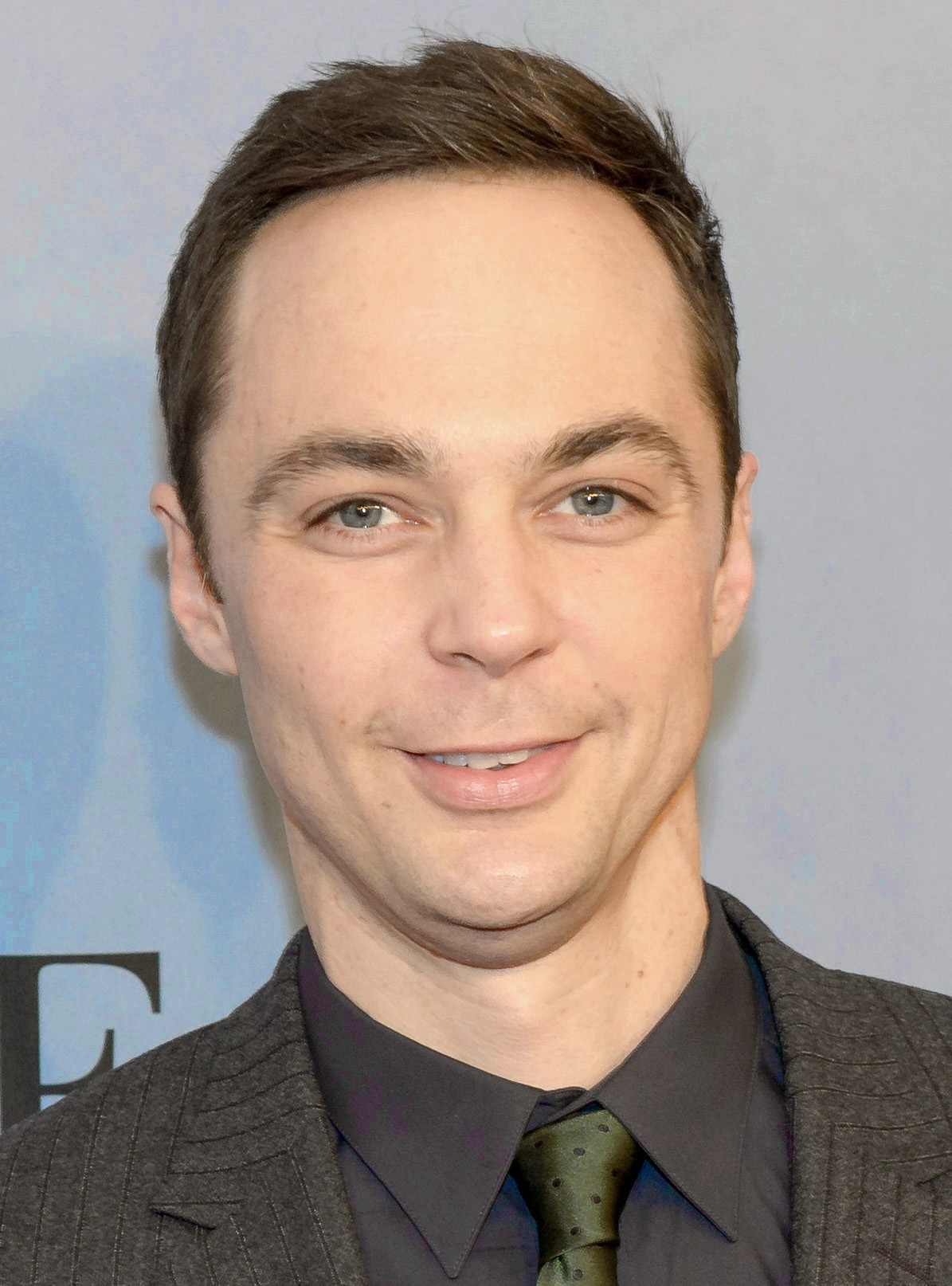
Jim Parsons

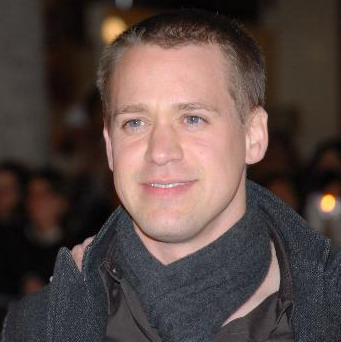
T. R. Knight

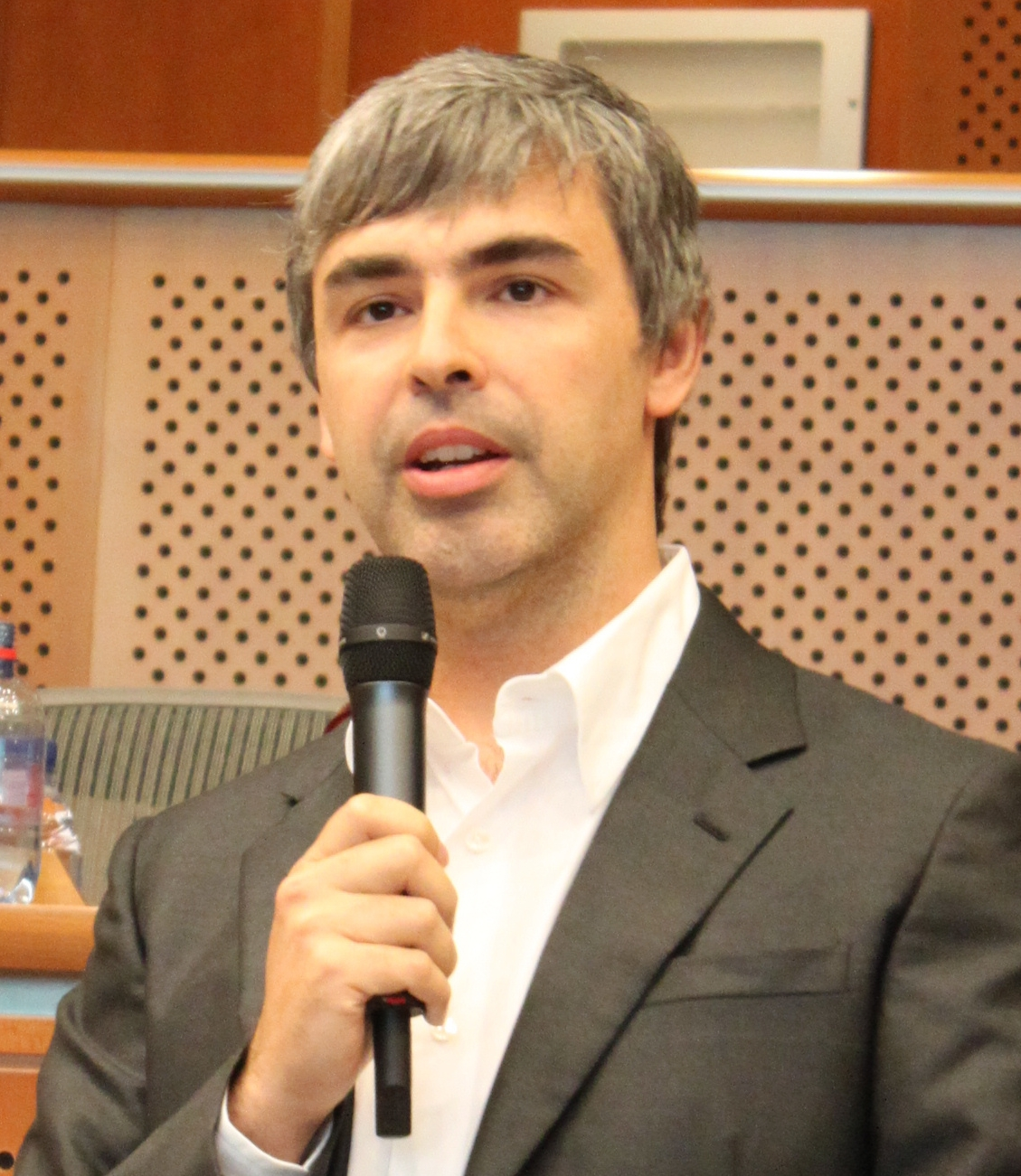
Larry Page

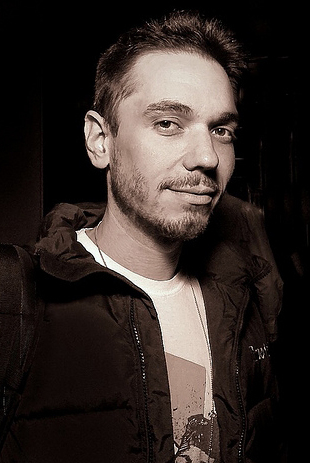
DJ AM

- March 1
  - Anton Gunn, politician
  - Kathrine Lee-Hinton, flight attendant
  - Chris Webber, basketball player
- March 2
  - Graham Boettcher, art curator
  - Bryan Coker, University administrator
- March 3
  - Brett Abrahams, geneticist and neuroscientist
  - Thomas Barnett, singer/songwriter
  - Alan Campos, football player
  - Ólafur Darri Ólafsson, actor, producer, and screenwriter
- March 4
  - Brian Barber, baseball player
  - Angela Chao, businesswoman and CEO of Foremost Group (d. 2024)
  - Len Wiseman, director, screenwriter, and producer
- March 5
  - Chad Campbell, politician
  - Ryan Franklin, baseball player
- March 6
  - Terry Adams, baseball player
  - Joshua Bergasse, choreographer and dancer
- March 7
  - John Aboud, writer and comedian
  - Luke Chueh, lowbrow, pop surrealist, and painter
  - Rick Emerson, radio presenter and author
- March 8
  - Tony Campos, bassist for Static-X and Fear Factory and frontman for Asesino
  - Giovanni Capriglione, politician
  - Bill Conaty, football player
  - Jahana Hayes, politician
- March 9 – Aaron Boone, baseball player and manager
- March 10
  - Natasha Alam, Uzbekistani-born actress and model
  - John LeCompt, musician
- March 11 – Ernest Allen, football player
- March 12 – Antonio Banks, football player
- March 13
  - Robert Conley, songwriter, record producer, engineer, mixer, and music publisher
  - David Draiman, singer and frontman for Disturbed
- March 14 – Betsy Brandt, actress
- March 15 – Janine Bowman, Olympic sport shooter
- March 16 – Tim Kang, actor
- March 17
  - Timothy Corcoran II, politician
  - Shannon McNally, singer/songwriter
  - Patricia Rushton, creator and founder of PITA organization
- March 18
  - Marcus Chait, actor and producer
  - Luci Christian, voice actress
- March 19
  - Peter Attia, Canadian-born physician
  - Brant Bjork, musician, singer/songwriter, record producer, and drummer
  - Bun B, rapper
- March 20
  - Annemarie Carney Axon, judge
  - Tony Baldwin, softball coach
  - Brent Brennan, football player and coach
  - Ronna McDaniel, politician and political strategist
  - Cedric Yarbrough, actor
- March 21
  - Larry Bowie, football player
  - Vanessa Branch, English-born actress and model
- March 22 – Alex Padilla, politician
- March 23
  - Brent Bilodeau, ice hockey player
  - Jakob S. Boeskov, Danish-born artist
  - Wendy Bruce, Olympic gymnast
  - Jason Kidd, basketball player
- March 24
  - Craig G, rapper
  - Jim Parsons, actor and producer
- March 25 – Jeff Beacher, producer, entrepreneur, and comedian
- March 26
  - Ryan Bolton, Olympic triathlete
  - T. R. Knight, actor
  - Larry Page, computer scientist, Internet entrepreneur, and co-founder of Google
- March 27
  - Bobby Black, journalist
  - Aimee Boorman, Olympic gymnastics coach
  - Spencer Collier, politician
- March 28
  - Brandon Cavitt, soccer player
  - Umaga, wrestler (d. 2009)
- March 29
  - Juan Alejandro Ávila, Mexican-born actor
  - Etdrick Bohannon, basketball player
  - Brad Bridgewater, Olympic swimmer
  - Brandi Love, porn actress
- March 30
  - Brian Behlendorf, technologist, executive, and computer programmer
  - Bitch, musician, actress, composer, and performance artist
  - Robin Coleman, actress, bodybuilder, and strongwoman
  - DJ AM, musician and DJ (d. 2009)
- March 31 – Reese Andy, mixed martial artist

=== April ===
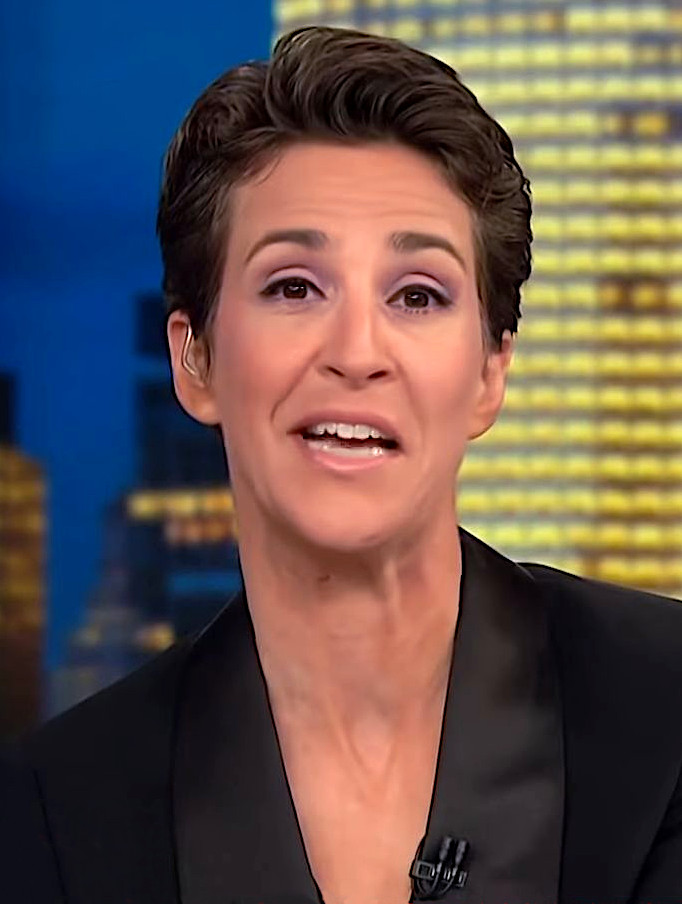
Rachel Maddow

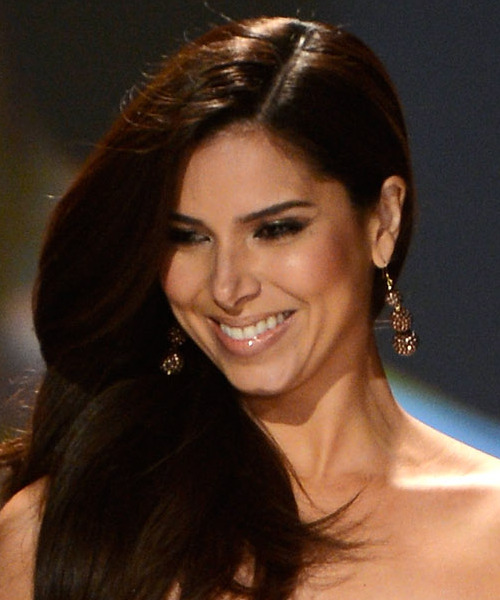
Roselyn Sánchez

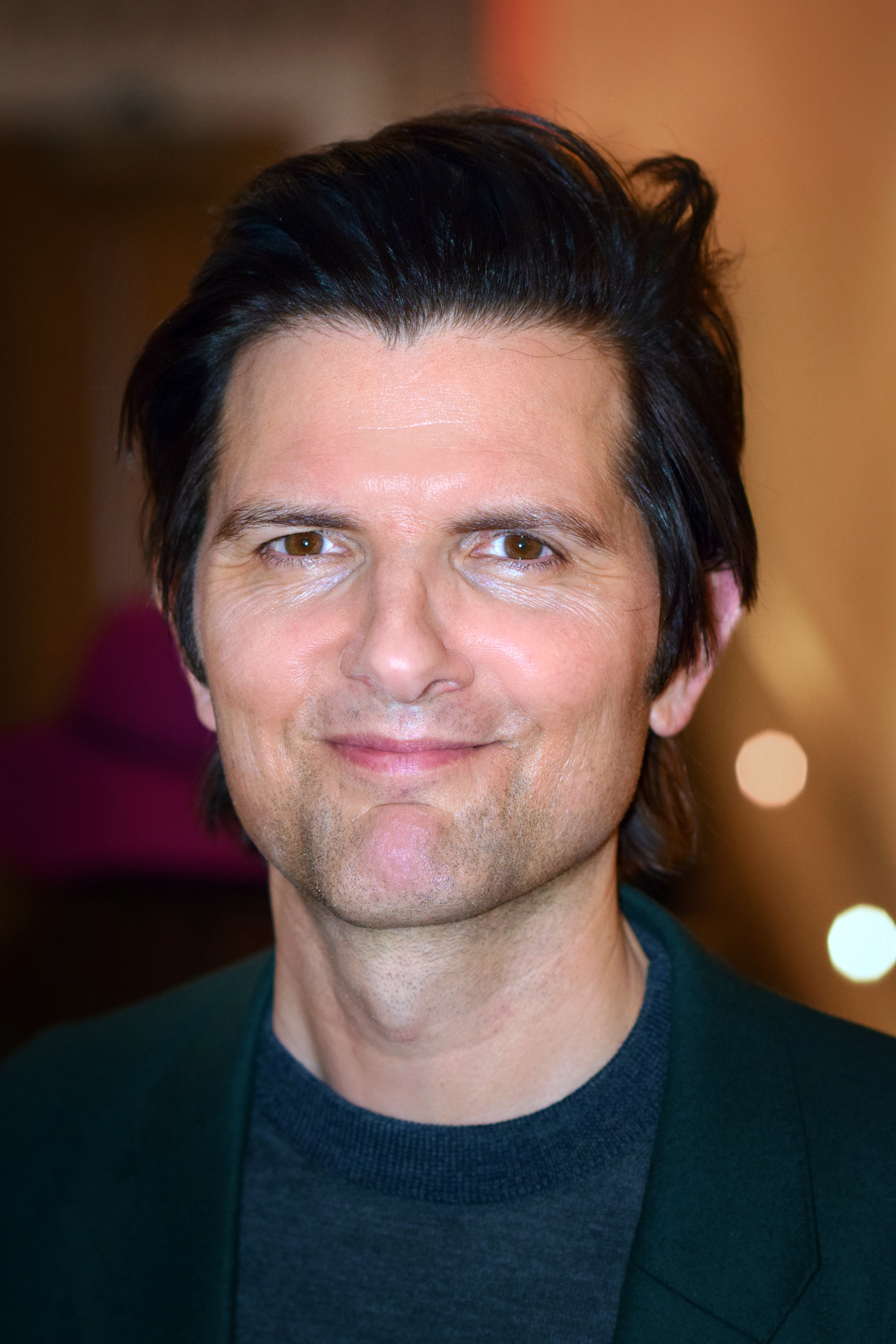
Adam Scott

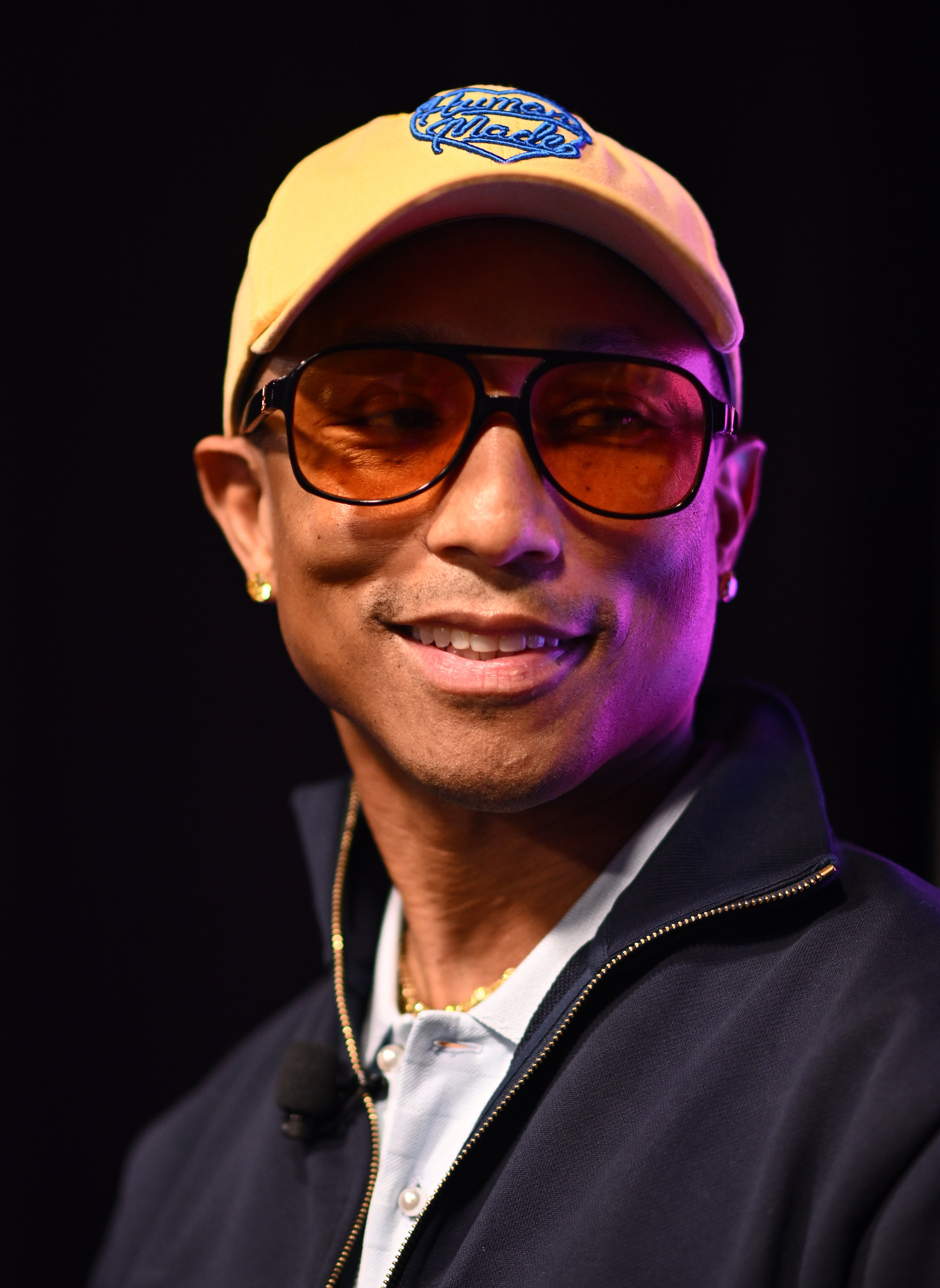
Pharrell Williams

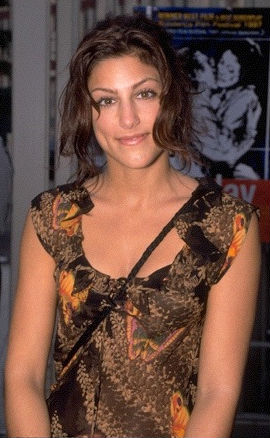
Jennifer Esposito

Adrien Brody

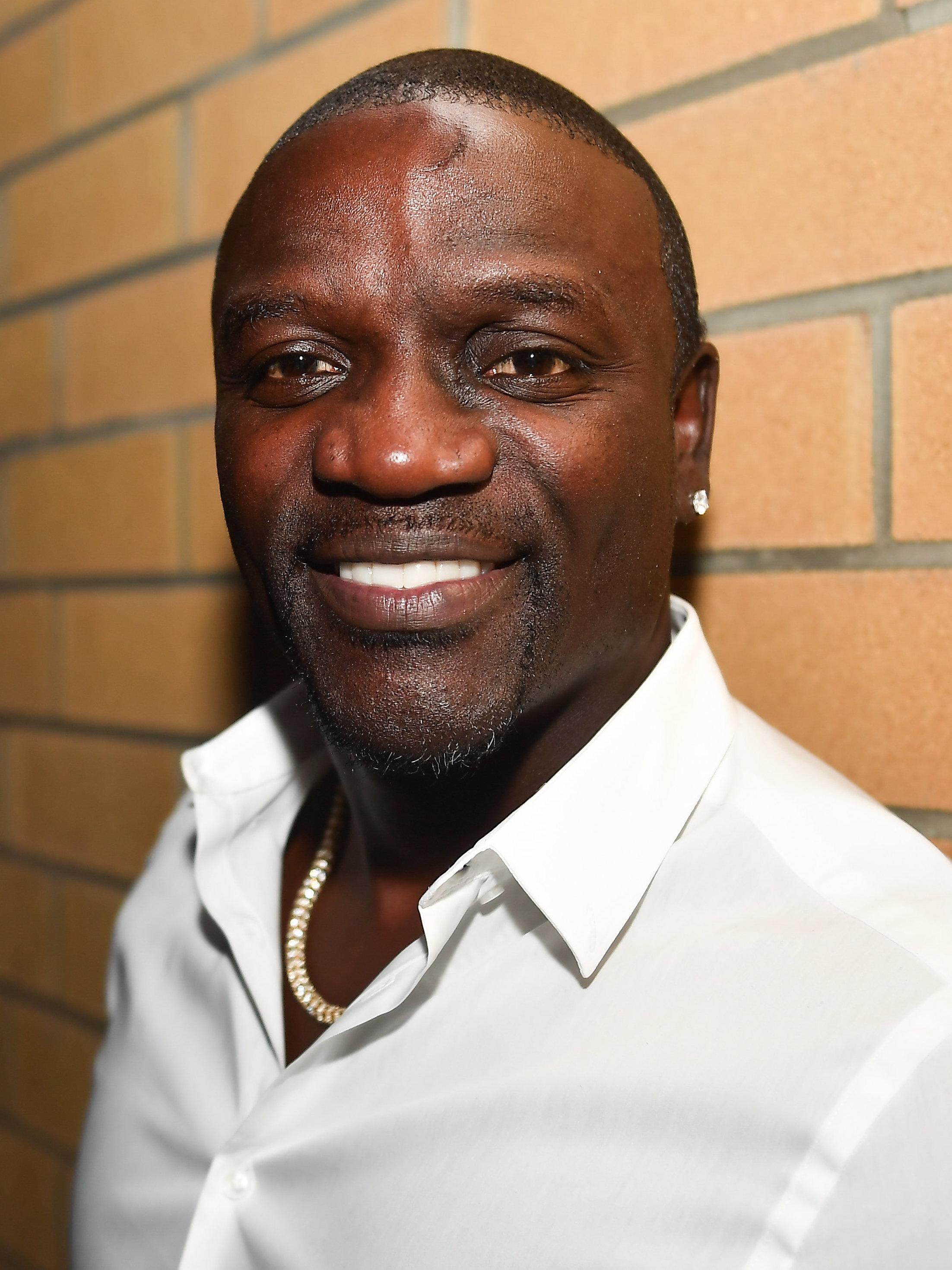
Akon

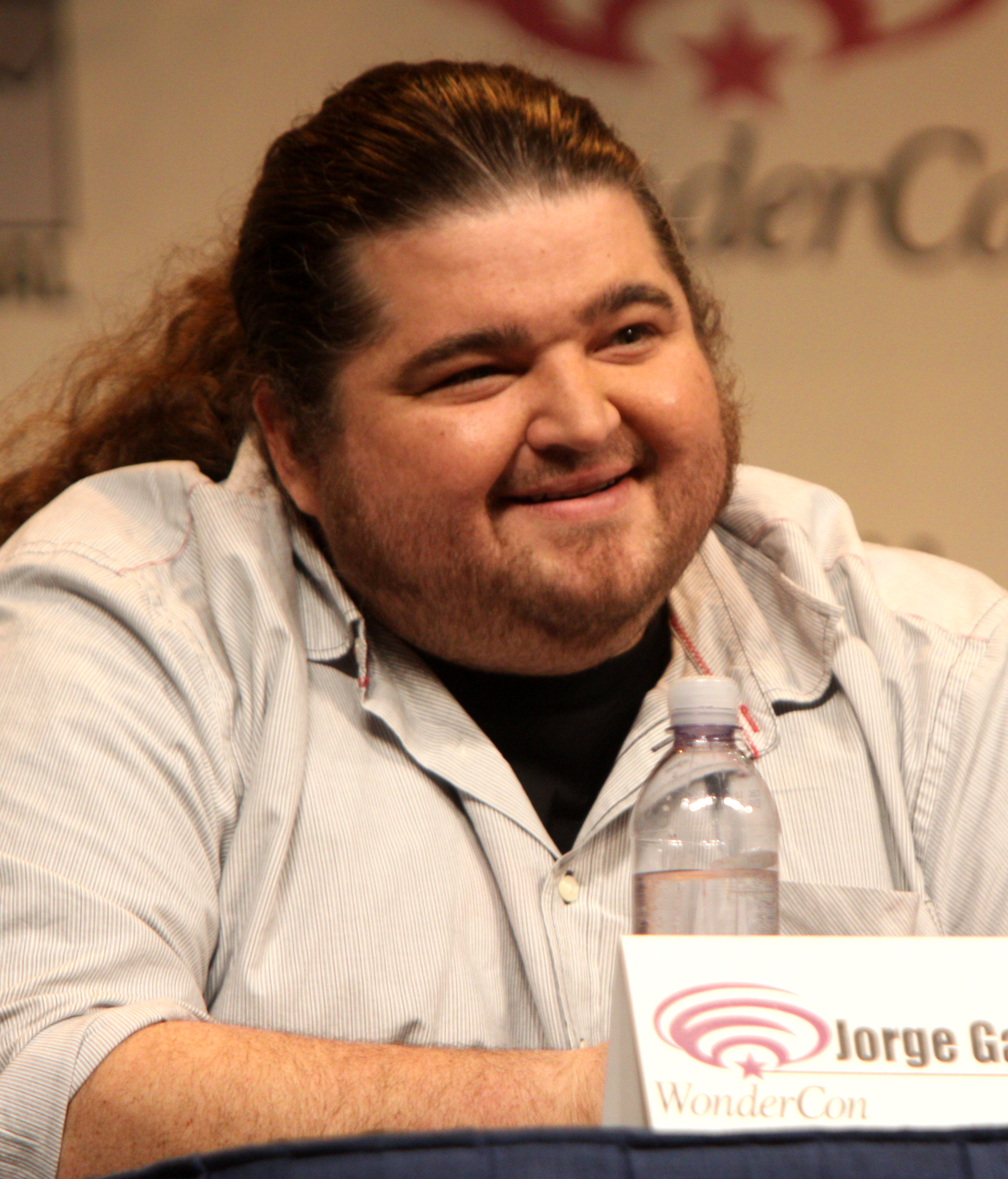
Jorge Garcia

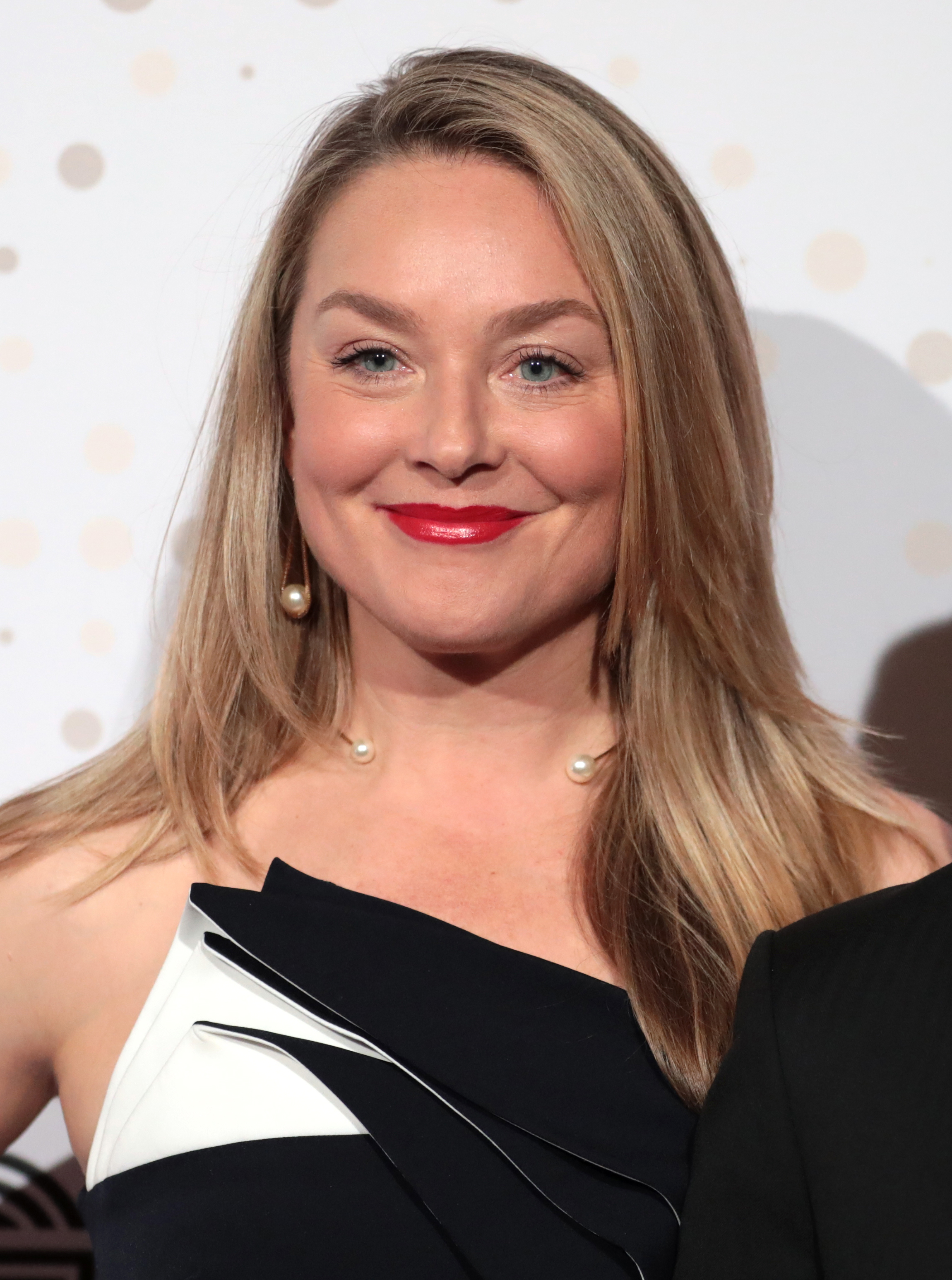
Elisabeth Röhm

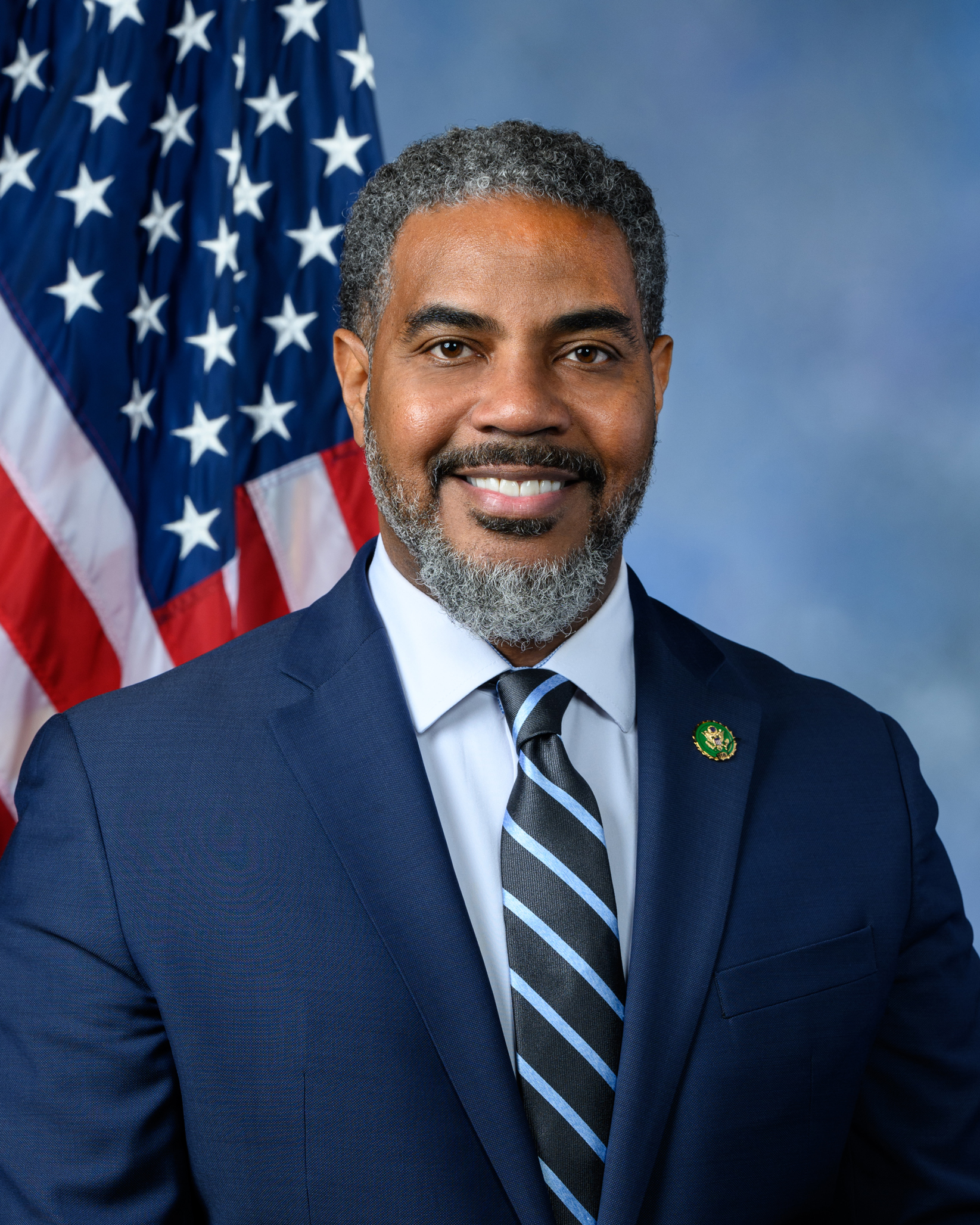
Steven Horsford

- April 1
  - Rachel Maddow, political commentator
  - Terry Vaughn, soccer referee (d. 2023)
- April 2 – Roselyn Sánchez, Puerto Rican-born actress
- April 3
  - Ashot Ariyan, Armenian-born Canadian-American composer and pianist
  - John Butler, football coach
  - Adam Scott, actor, comedian, and producer
- April 4
  - Chris Banks, football player (d. 2014)
  - David Blaine, magician
- April 5
  - Tony Banks, football player
  - Derek Kerswill, drummer
  - Pharrell Williams, singer
- April 6
  - Lori Heuring, actress
  - Franck Marchis, astronomer
  - Cindy Robinson, voice actress
- April 7 – Amy Anzel, entrepreneur, actress, producer, and television presenter
- April 8 – Emma Caulfield, actress
- April 9 – Tim Camp, football player and coach
- April 11
  - Sadie Benning, artist
  - Blake Brockermeyer, football player and coach
  - Jon Clark, football player
  - Jennifer Esposito, actress
- April 12
  - William Berlind, theatre producer
  - Mark Brooks, comic book artist
  - J. Brett Busby, lawyer and judge
  - J. Scott Campbell, comic book artist
  - Paul Chan, artist and writer
  - Christina Moore, actress
- April 13 – Bokeem Woodbine, actor
- April 14
  - Gino Bona, marketing professional
  - Adrien Brody, actor
  - James Coley, football coach
- April 16
  - Akon, rapper, singer/songwriter, and record producer
  - Will Creedle, software engineer
- April 18
  - Jad Abumrad, radio host
  - Derrick Brooks, football player
  - Brady Clark, baseball player
- April 19
  - Michael Bacall, actor and screenwriter
  - Eric Berger, journalist and meteorologist
  - Laura Schwartz, speaker, author, and commentator
- April 20
  - Todd Hollandsworth baseball player and sportscaster
  - Julie Powell, food writer and memoirist (d. 2022)
- April 21
  - Braniff Bonaventure, football player
  - Kevin Brown, baseball player
- April 22
  - Frank Artiles, politician
  - Christopher Sabat, voice actor
- April 23
  - Hala Ayala, politician
  - Daphne Bloomer, actress
- April 24
  - Jason Bohn, golfer
  - Paul Cardall, pianist
  - Markus W. Covert, researcher and University professor
  - Brian Marshall, bassist for Creed and Alter Bridge
- April 25
  - Cornelius Bundrage, boxer
  - Bobby Pulido, singer/songwriter and political candidate
  - Julie Roginsky, political strategist and television personality
- April 26
  - Geoff Blum, baseball player
  - Melonie Cannon, singer
- April 27
  - Ink Aleaga, football player
  - Jillian Bach, actress
  - Andrew Ballen, American-born Chinese businessman
  - Jared Brown, football player
- April 28
  - Big Gipp, rapper
  - Isaac Carree, gospel musician
  - Melissa Fahn, actress
  - Matt Fox, musician and guitarist for Shai Hulud
  - Jorge Garcia, actor and comedian
  - Elisabeth Röhm, German-born actress
- April 29
  - Cheney Brannon, drummer for Collective Soul (2008–2012)
  - Steven Horsford, politician
- April 30 – Jeff Timmons, singer and member of 98 Degrees

=== May ===
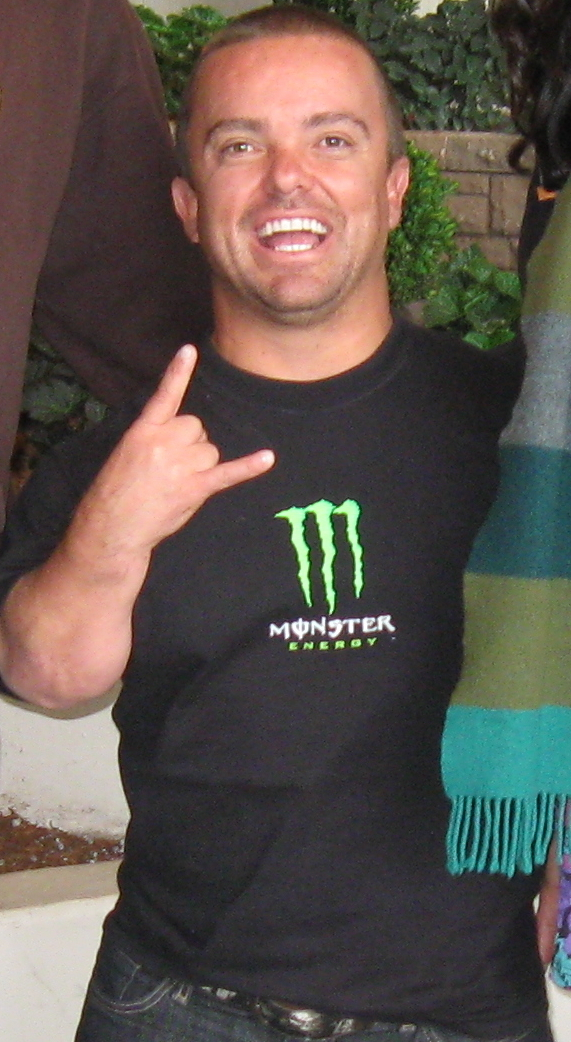
Jason 'Weeman' Acuña

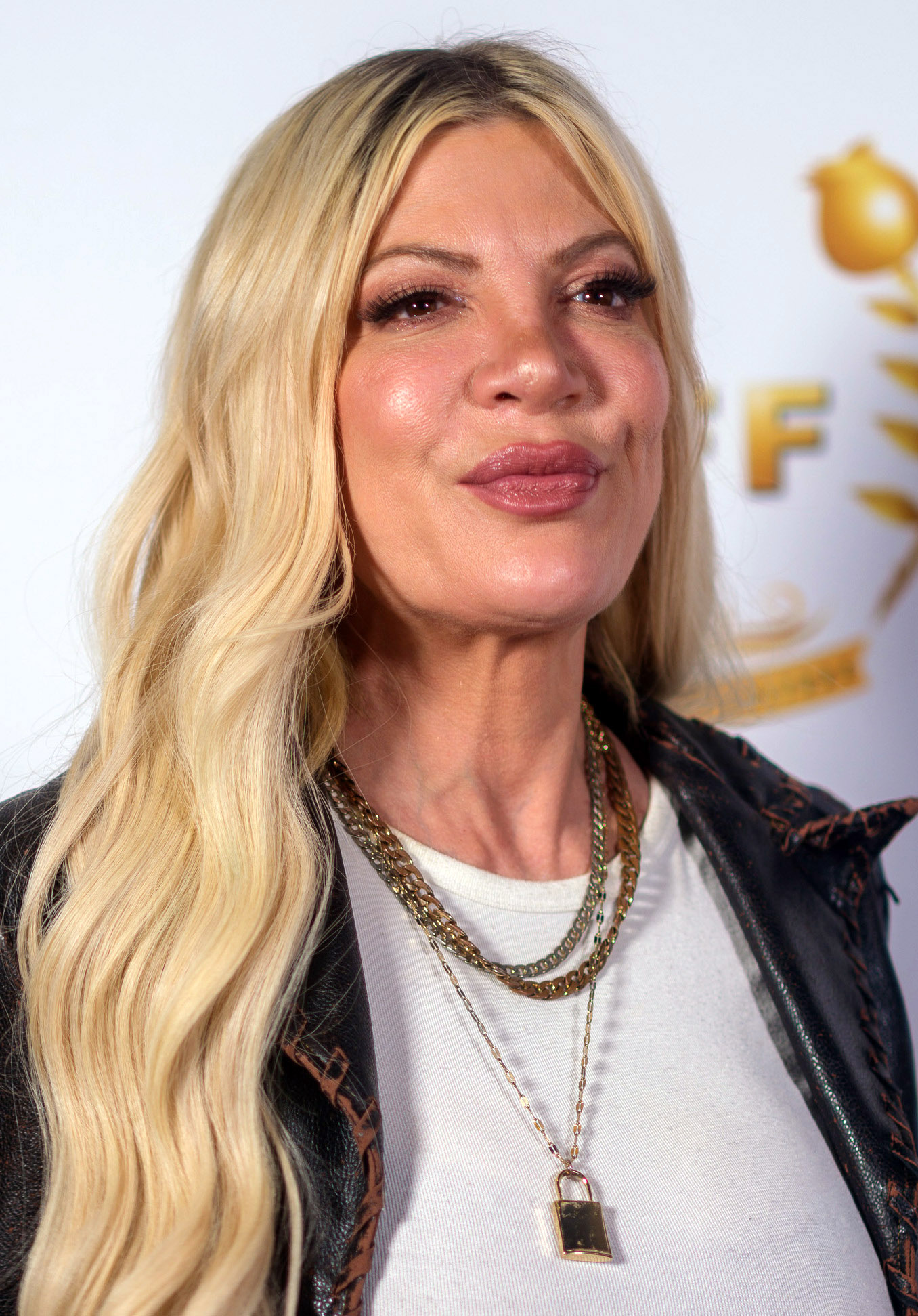
Tori Spelling

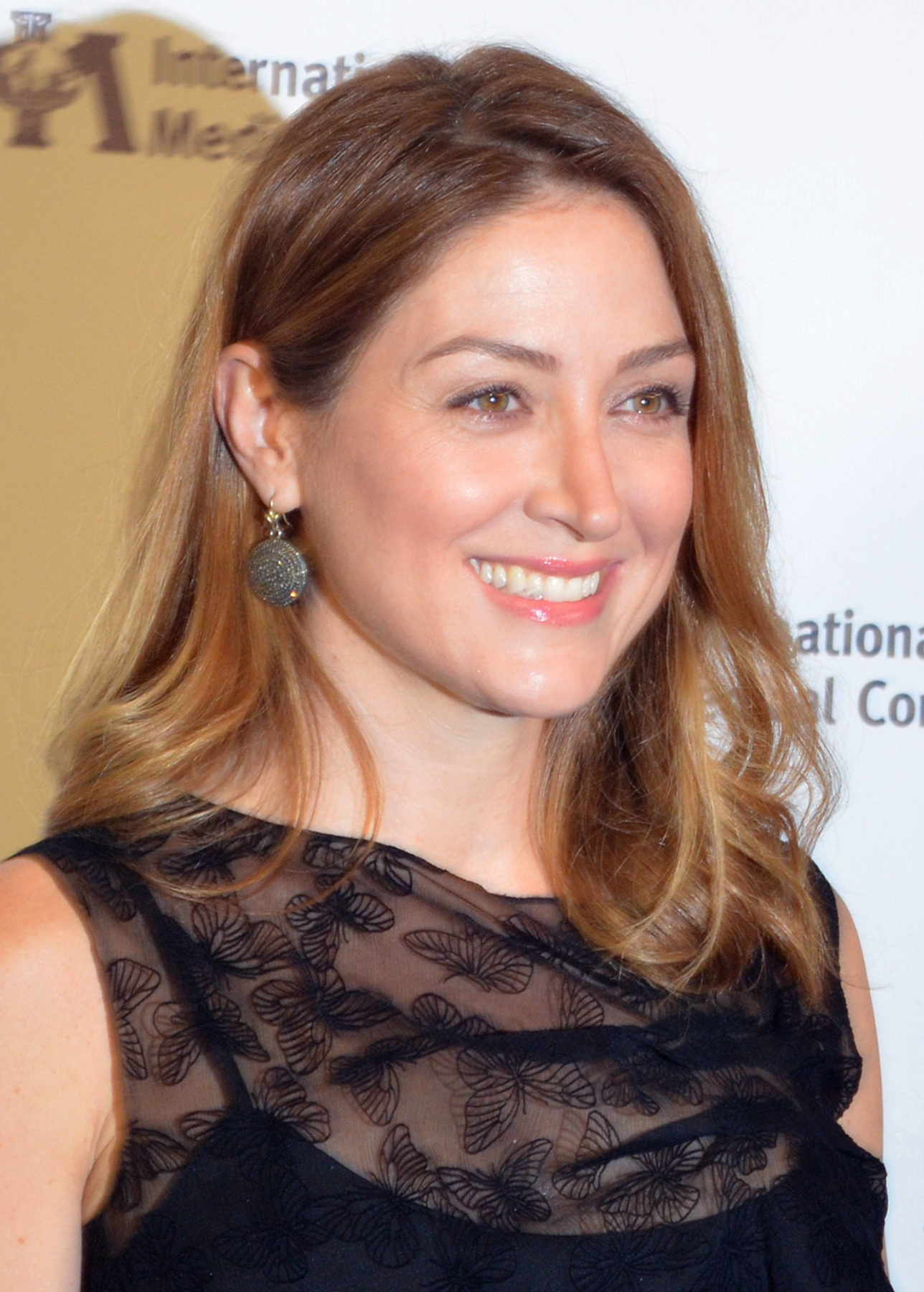
Sasha Alexander

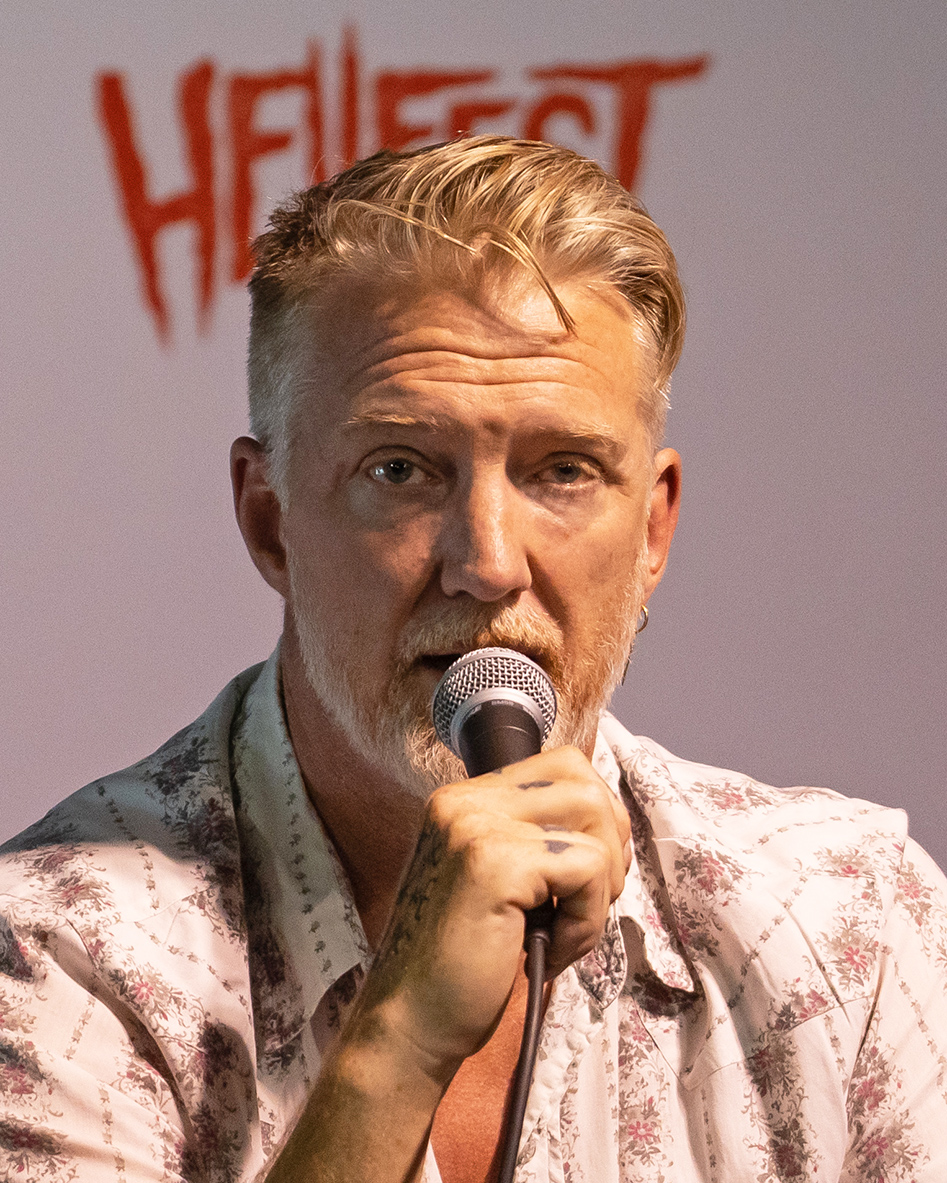
Josh Homme

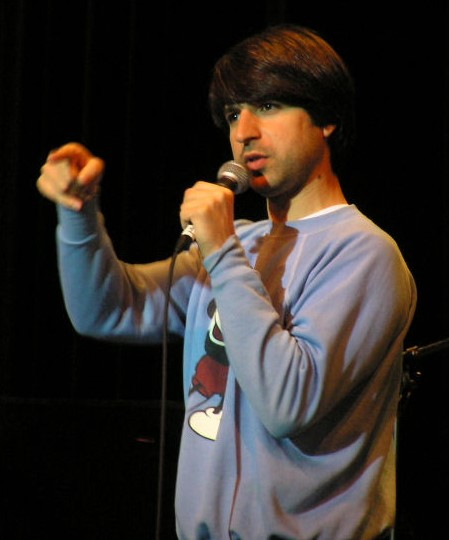
Demetri Martin

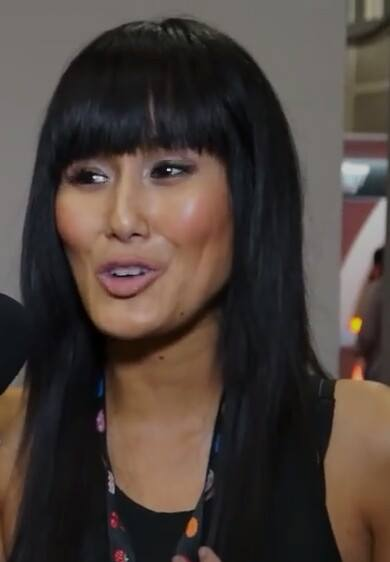
Minae Noji

- May 1
  - Andrew Bajadali, cyclist
  - Sam Bakhtiar, Iranian-born fitness entrepreneur and author
  - Rhonda Banchero, basketball player
  - Frank Beede, football player
  - Rachel Brand, politician
  - Jason Champion, gospel musician
  - Susane Colasanti, author
  - Chris Couch, golfer
  - Curtis Martin, football player
- May 2 – Justin Burnett, composer
- May 4
  - Cage, rapper
  - John Cyrier, politician
  - Harper Phillips, alpine skier
- May 5
  - Nicholas Bloom, British-born university professor
  - Casino Versus Japan, electronic musician
  - David Chan, violinist and conductor
  - Mickey Jack Cones, record producer and singer/songwriter
- May 6 – Mike Borkowski, race car driver
- May 7 – John Atwell, racing driver
- May 9
  - David Bevis, basketball player
  - Big Scoob, rapper
- May 10
  - Steve Berra, skateboarder and founder of The Berrics
  - Jim Butler, politician
- May 11 – James Haven, actor
- May 12
  - Mackenzie Astin, actor
  - Kendra Kassebaum, actress and singer
  - Bobby Kent, murder victim (d. 1993)
  - Travis Lutter, mixed martial artist
  - Forbes March, actor
- May 13 – Warren Ballentine, motivational speaker, attorney, political activist, and radio talk show host
- May 14
  - Chris Christenson, surfboard shaper, craftsman, and outdoor enthusiast
  - Lisa Cole, soccer player and coach
  - Shanice, singer
- May 15
  - Steve Benen, blogger and political writer
  - Suzannah Bianco, Olympic swimmer
- May 16
  - Muna AbuSulayman, American-born Saudi businesswoman and activist
  - Jason 'Weeman' Acuña, skateboarder, stuntman, and actor
  - Mackenzie Astin, actor
  - Craig Brockman, rapper and record producer
  - Tori Spelling, actress
  - Keith Williams, bodybuilder and football player
- May 17
  - Sasha Alexander, actress
  - Josh Homme, singer/songwriter and frontman for Queens of the Stone Age
  - Matthew McGrory, actor (d. 2005)
- May 18 – The Blue Meanie, wrestler
- May 19 – Mike D'Antonio, bassist for Killswitch Engage
- May 20
  - Carl Anderton Jr., politician
  - Ben Arthur, singer/songwriter and novelist
  - Steve Berger, mixed martial artist
- May 21 – Stewart Cink, golfer
- May 23 – Jason Nash, dancer
- May 24
  - Elisa Bridges, actress and model (d. 2002)
  - Bartolo Colón, Dominican-born baseball player
- May 25
  - Jean-Pierre Canlis, glass artist
  - Demetri Martin, actor and comedian
  - Molly Sims, fashion model and actress
- May 26 – Christine Clayburg, meteorologist
- May 27
  - Shaw Blackmon, politician
  - Jack McBrayer, actor and comedian
- May 29 – Michael Balderrama, choreographer, dancer, and producer
- May 30
  - Allen Aldridge, football player
  - Jenna Busch, entertainment journalist
  - Je'Rod Cherry, football player
  - Minae Noji, actress
- May 31 – Joshua J. Cohen, politician, mayor of Annapolis, Maryland (2009–2013)

=== June ===
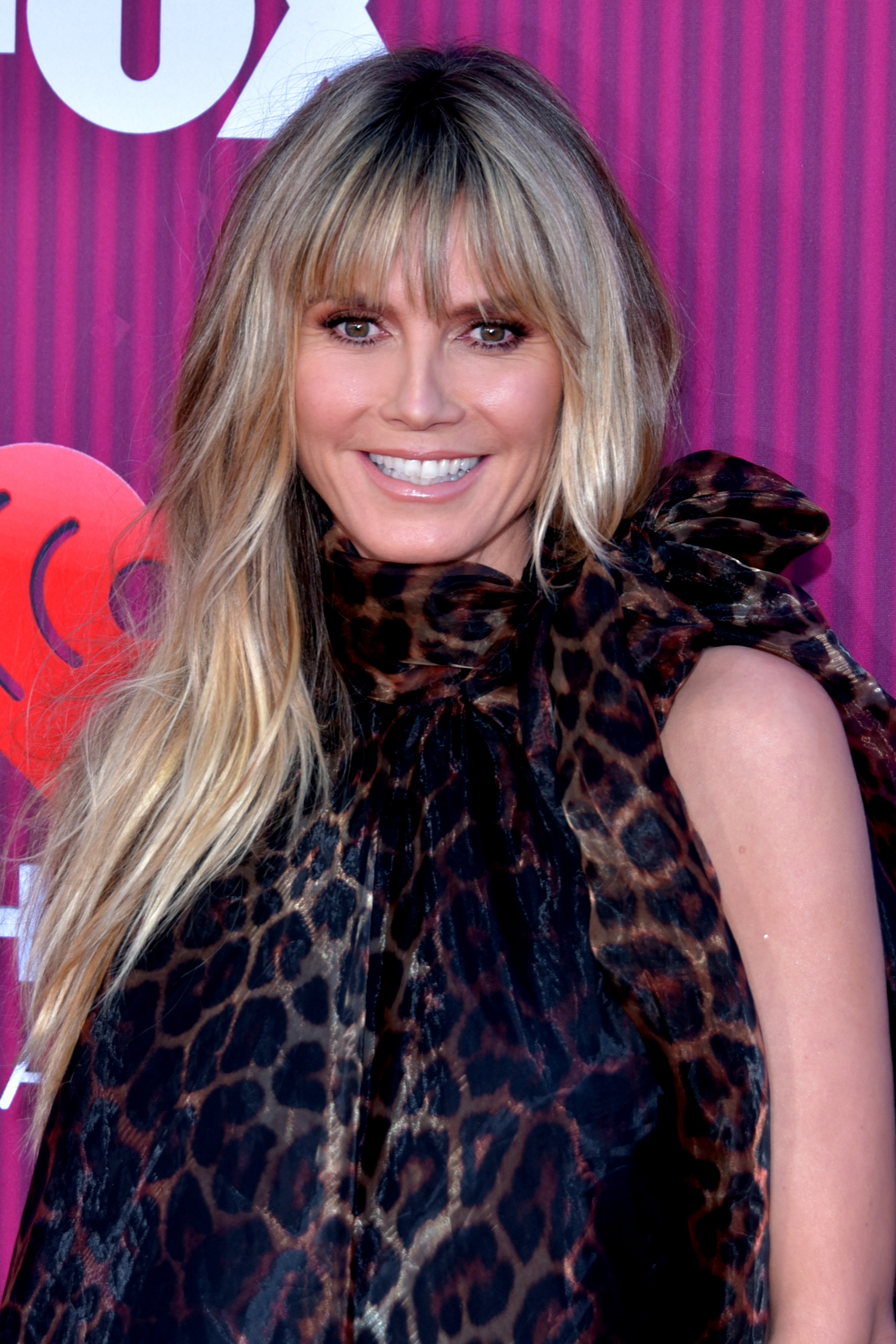
Heidi Klum

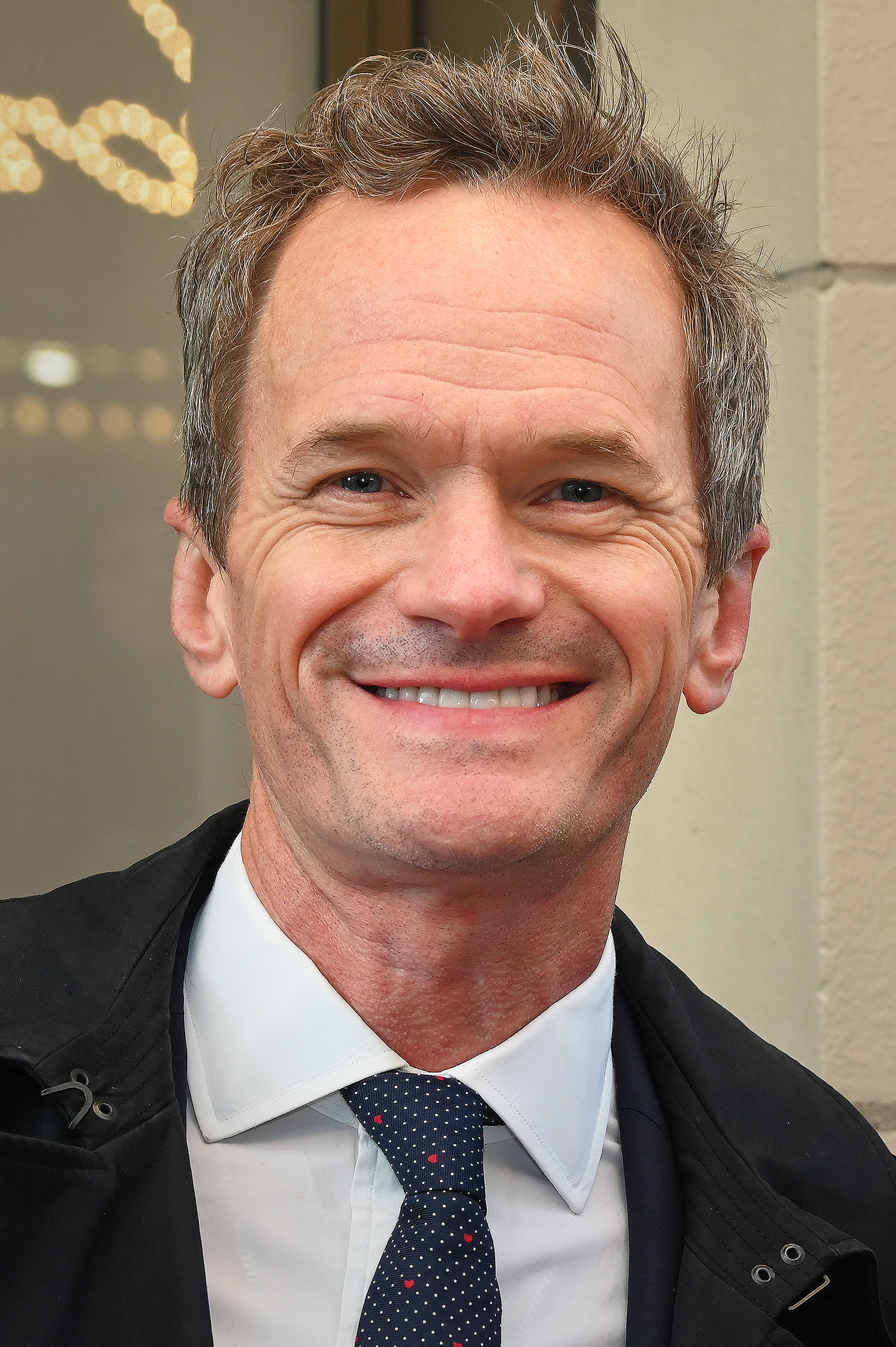
Neil Patrick Harris

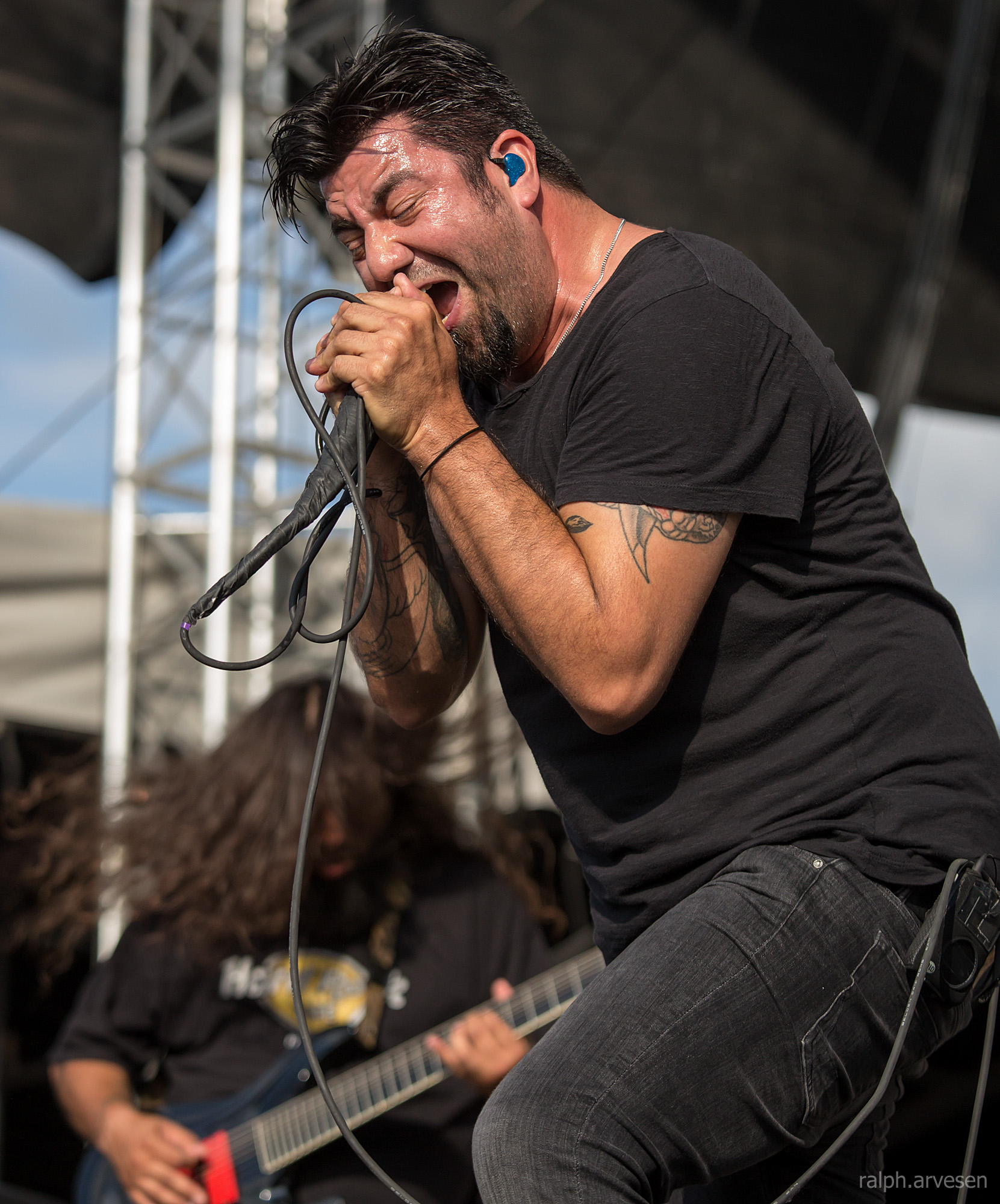
Chino Moreno

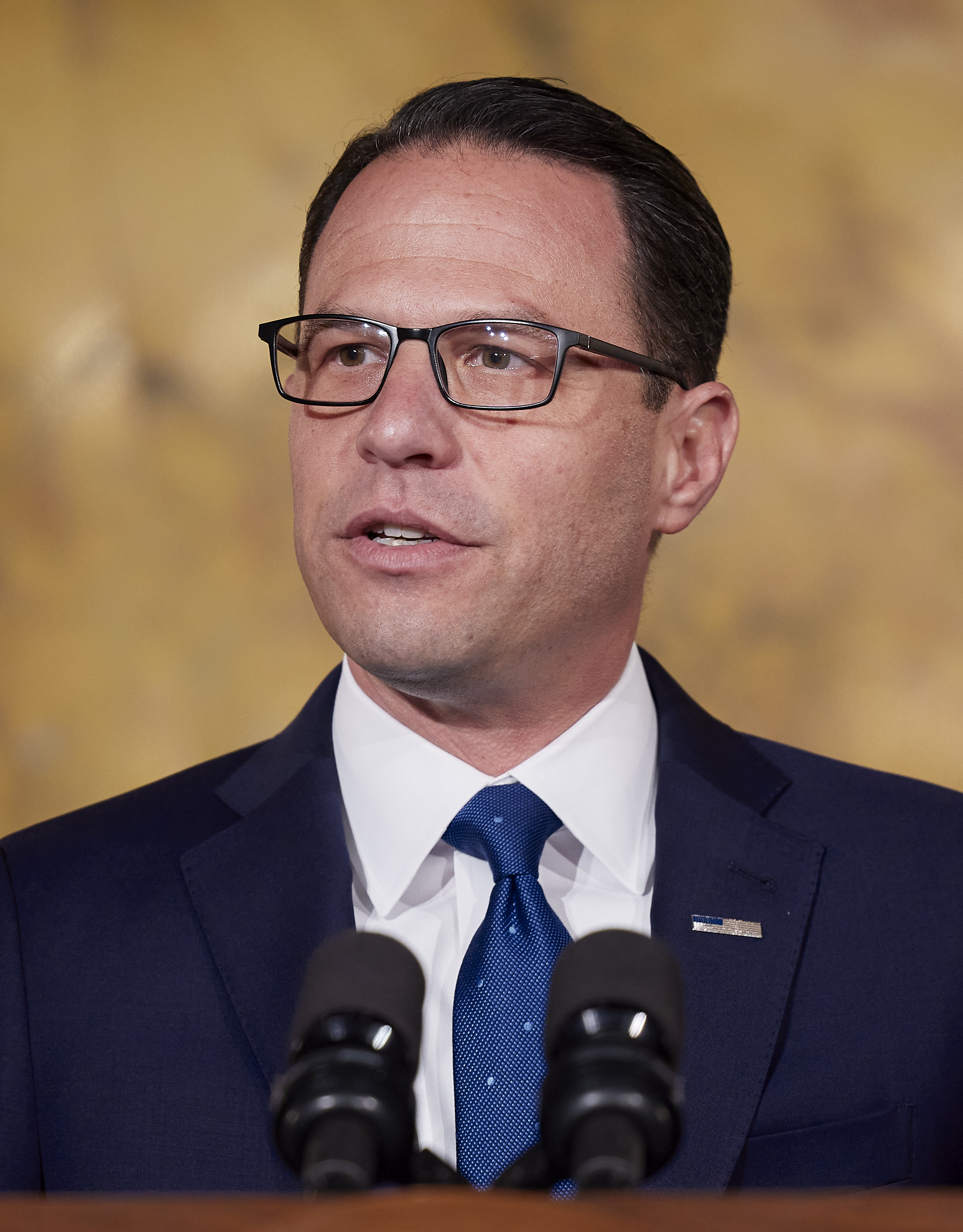
Josh Shapiro

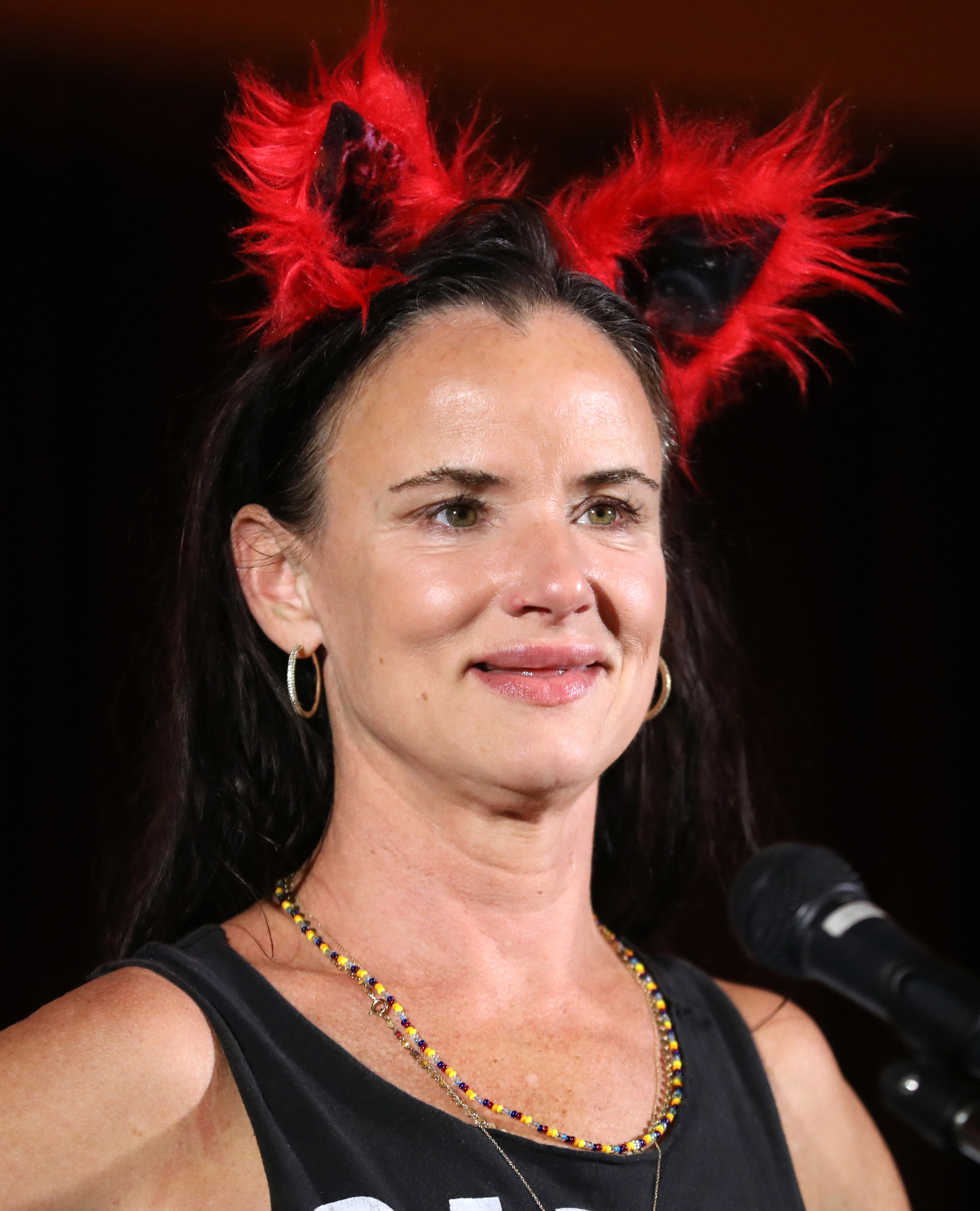
Juliette Lewis

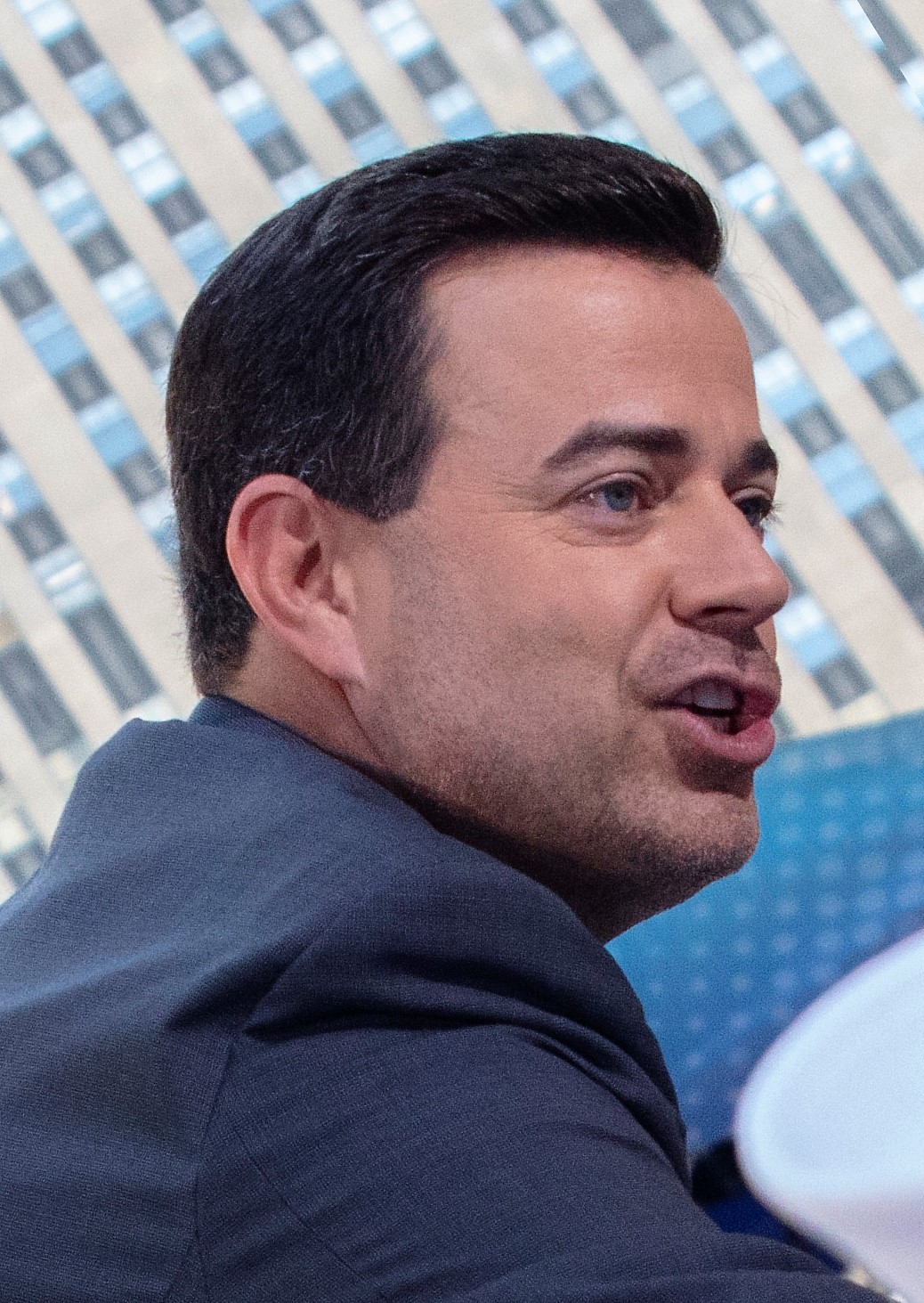
Carson Daly

- June 1
  - Ray Carey, swimmer
  - Heidi Klum, German-born model
  - Derek Lowe, baseball player
- June 2 – Kevin Feige, filmmaker and president of Marvel Studios
- June 3
  - Zak Baney, record producer, songwriter, screenwriter, filmmaker, and photographer
  - Erwin Claggett, basketball player
- June 4
  - Antonio Anderson, football player
  - James Bowden, football player
  - Doug Colman, football player and coach
  - Matt Corboy, actor
- June 5 – Lamon Brewster, boxer
- June 8 – James Baron, football player
- June 9
  - Tedy Bruschi, football player
  - Raquel Cepeda, journalist, critic, filmmaker, and autobiographer
  - Matt Mahaffey, multi-instrumentalist, record producer, composer, and recording engineer
- June 10 – Faith Evans, singer
- June 11
  - Ira Bowman, basketball player and coach
  - Dana Brunetti, producer
- June 12
  - Jason Caffey, basketball player
  - Jennifer Jo Cobb, stock car racing driver
  - Clint Crowe, politician
- June 13
  - Sam Adams, football player
  - Ogie Banks, voice actor
  - Xochiquetzal Candelaria, poet
  - Paul Chirik, chemist
- June 14
  - Jimmy Button, motocross racer
  - Joel Souza, filmmaker
- June 15
  - Neil Patrick Harris, actor, producer, singer, comedian, magician, and television host
  - Greg Vaughan, actor
- June 16 – Eddie Cibrian, actor
- June 18 – Holly Cruikshank, dancer
- June 19
  - Jahine Arnold, football player
  - Chris Beatty, football player and coach
- June 20
  - Aquil Abdullah, Olympic rower
  - Rickey Cradle, baseball player
  - Chino Moreno, singer and frontman for Deftones
  - Josh Shapiro, politician, 48th Governor of Pennsylvania
- June 21
  - Mark Braud, jazz musician
  - Sammie Burroughs, football player
  - Duke Castiglione, broadcaster and news anchor
  - Juliette Lewis, actress and singer
- June 22
  - Cory Alexander, basketball player and announcer
  - Carson Daly, television personality and host
- June 23
  - Carter Albrecht, keyboardist and guitarist for Edie Brickell & New Bohemians (d. 2007)
  - Scott-Vincent Borba, esthetician, model, singer, and actor
- June 24 – Michael Cheever, football player
- June 25 – Rukmini Callimachi, Romanian-born journalist
- June 26
  - Reggie Brown, football player
  - Kyle Jacobs, country songwriter, vocalist, guitarist, and pianist (d. 2023)
  - Gretchen Wilson, country singer/songwriter
- June 27 – Jennifer Brundage, softball player
- June 28
  - Stan Bowman, Canadian-born ice hockey executive
  - DJ Vlad, interviewer
- June 29
  - Lance Barber, actor
  - Daniel J. Bauer, statistician and university professor
- June 30 – Robert Bales, United States Army staff-sergeant and suspect in the Kandahar massacre

=== July ===
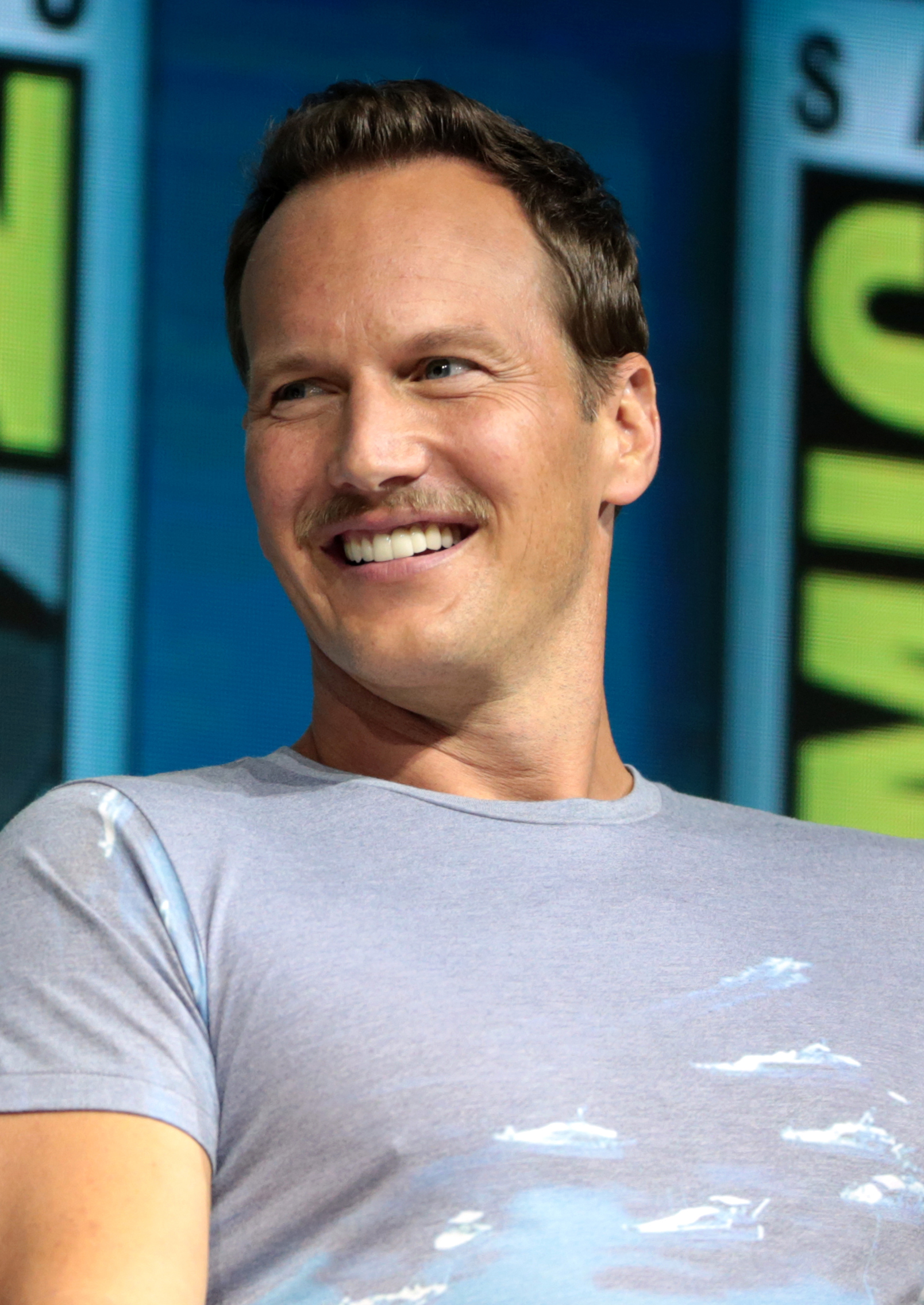
Patrick Wilson

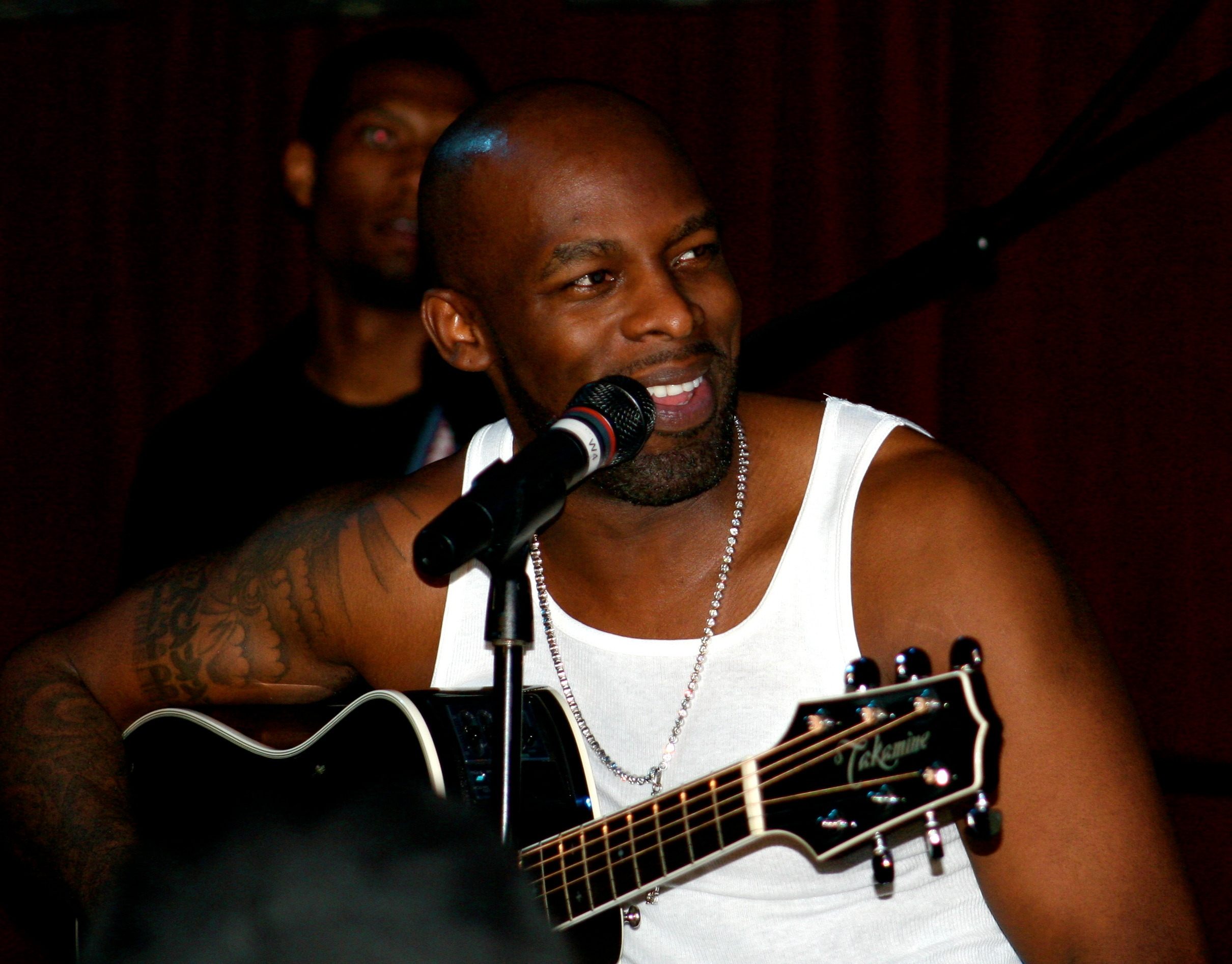
Joe

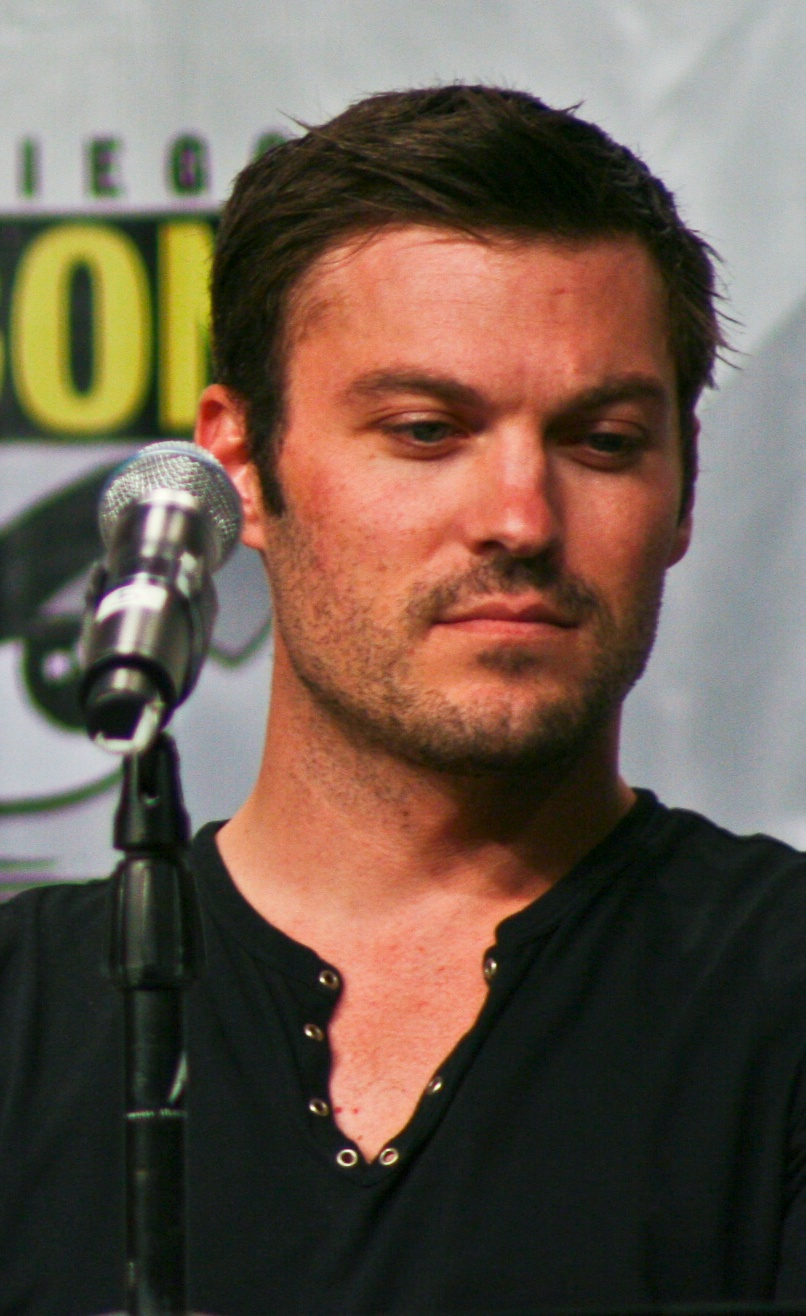
Brian Austin Green

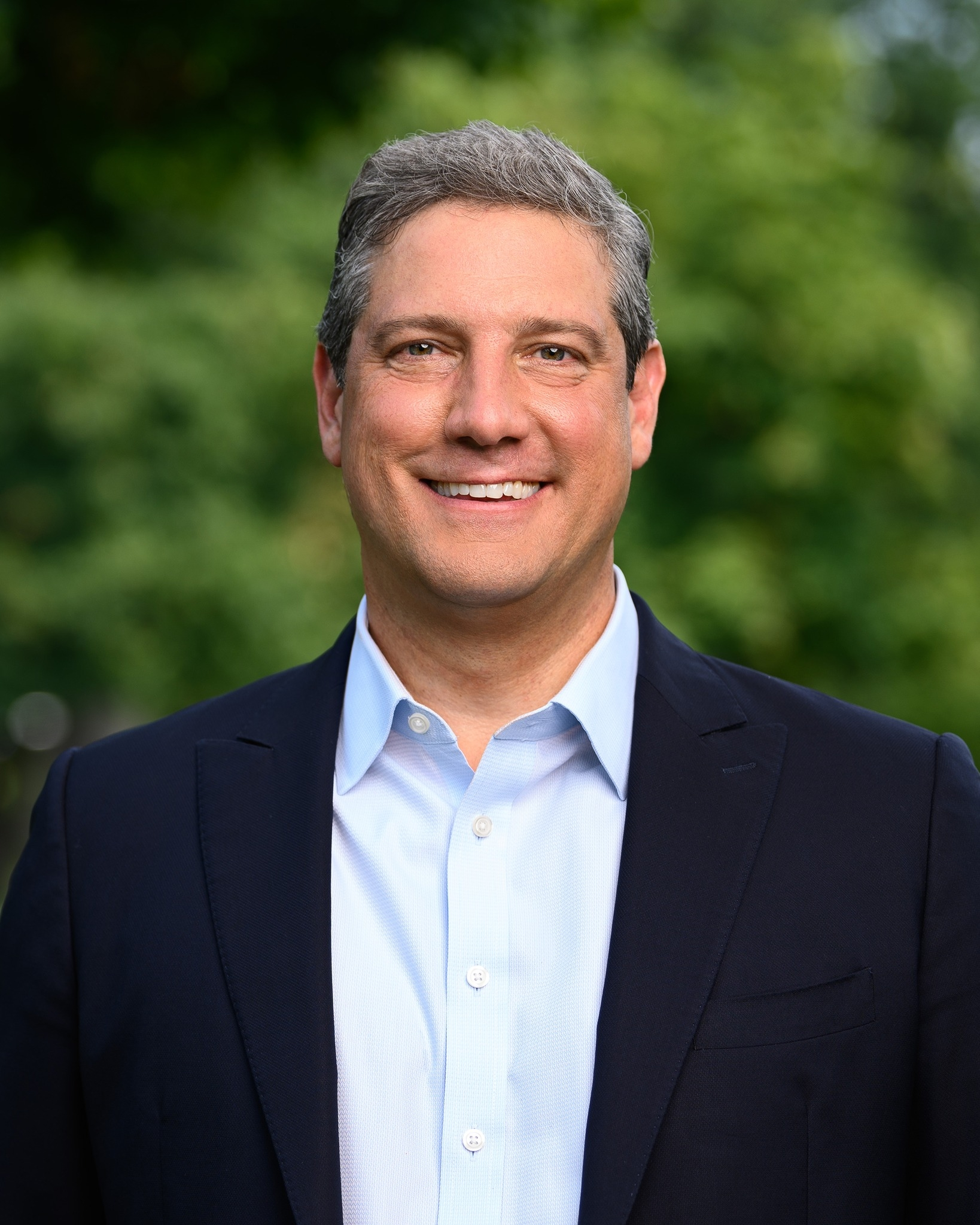
Tim Ryan

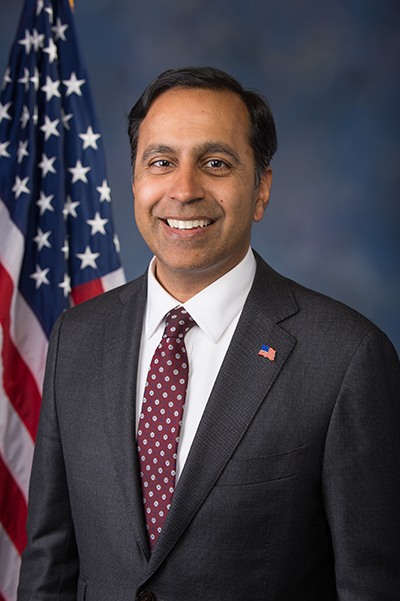
Raja Krishnamoorthi

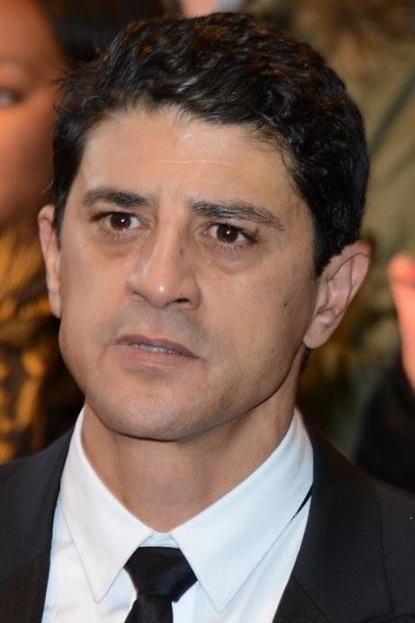
Saïd Taghmaoui

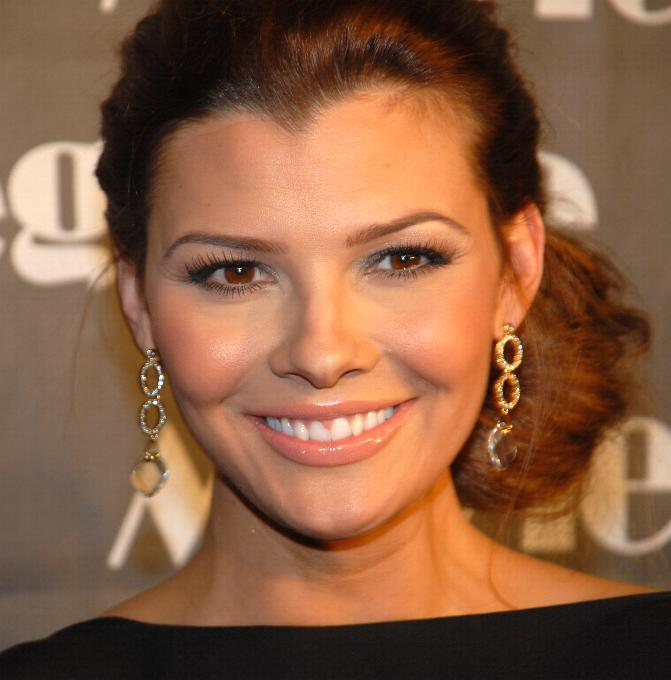
Ali Landry

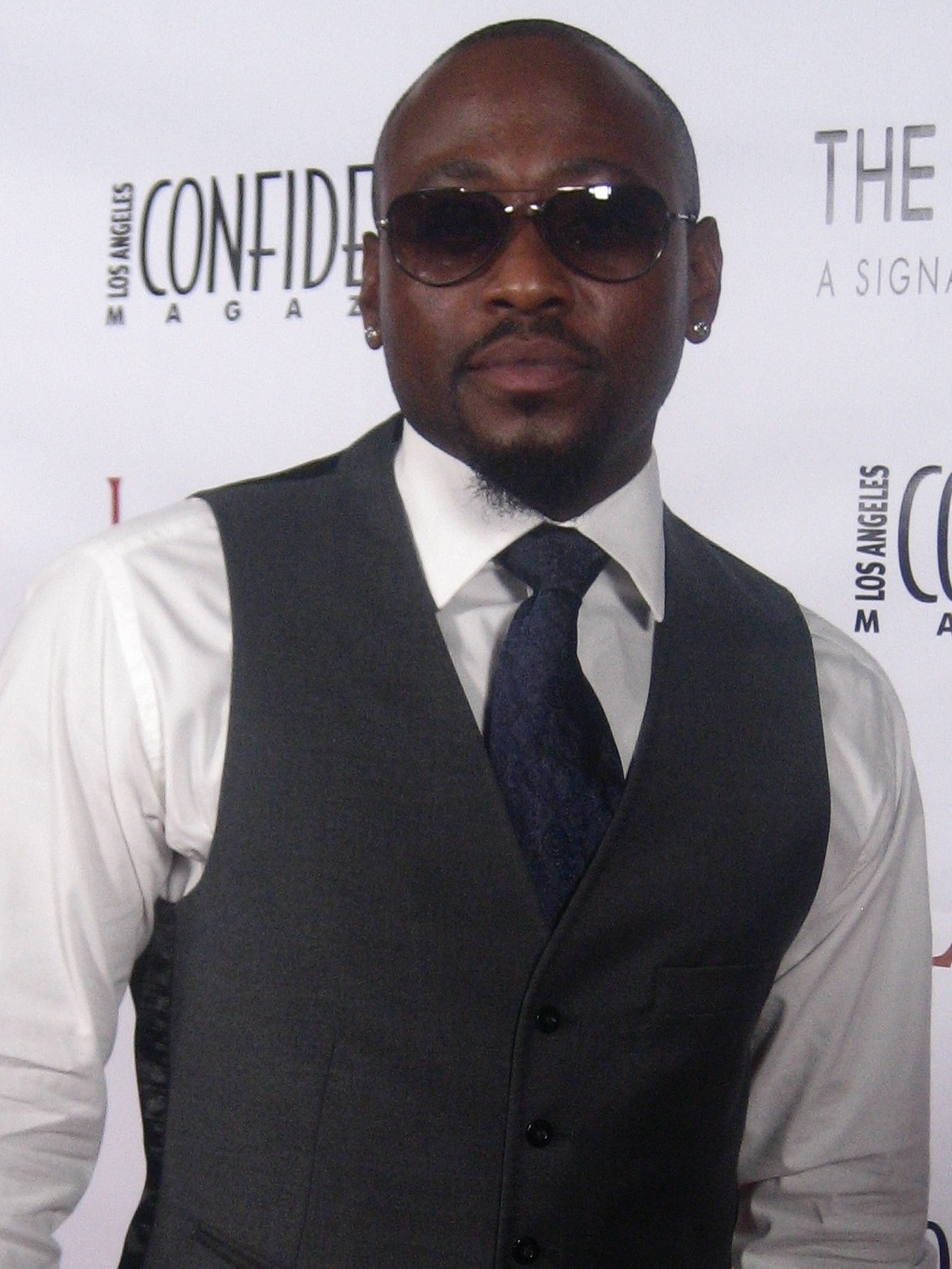
Omar Epps

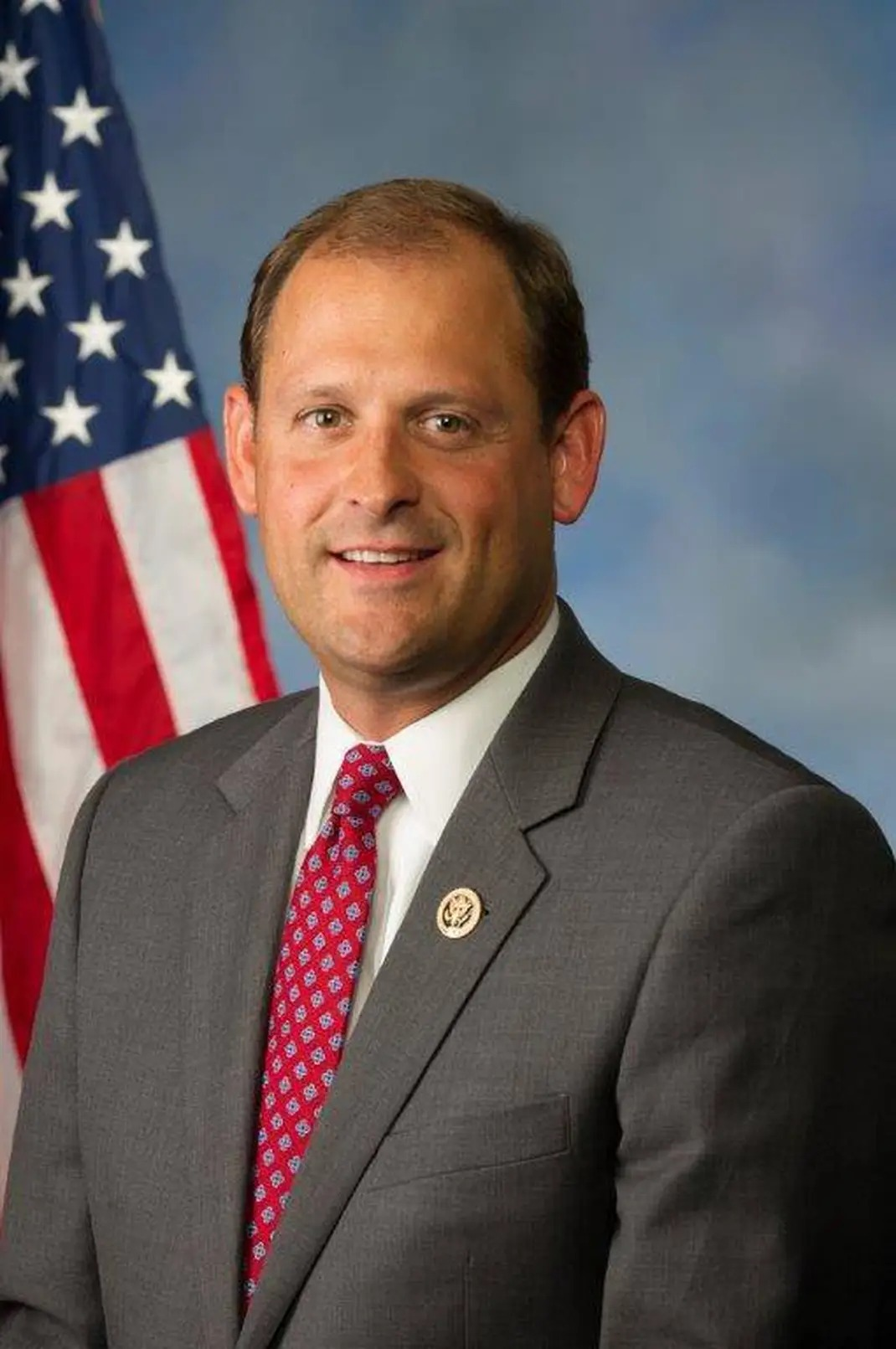
Andy Barr

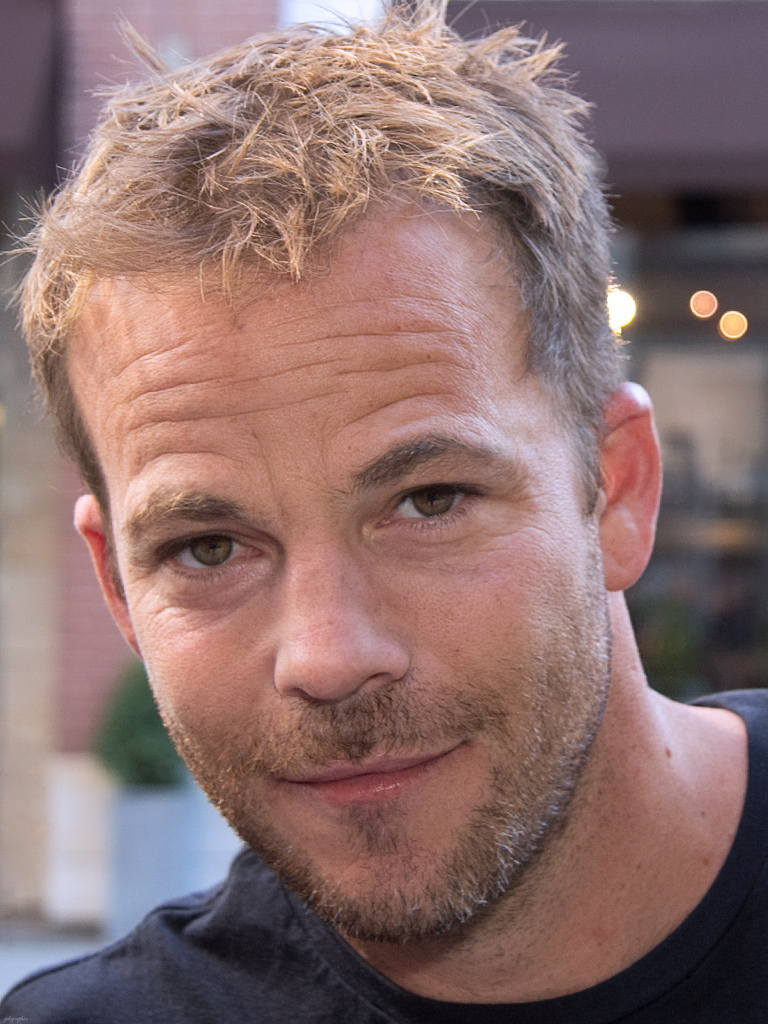
Stephen Dorff

- July 1
  - Roman Bezrukavnikov, Russian-born mathimatician
  - Scott Blanton, football player
  - Brenton Brown, South African-born Christian musician and worship leader
- July 2
  - Teodross Avery, jazz saxophonist
  - Kari Chisholm, political consultant and sports commentator
  - Scotty 2 Hotty, wrestler
- July 3
  - Devin Bush Sr., football player and coach
  - Owen H.M. Smith, producer, writer, actor, and comedian
  - Patrick Wilson, actor
- July 4 – Jay Canizaro, baseball player
- July 5
  - Hayward Clay, football player
  - Joe, singer/songwriter and record producer
- July 6
  - Hallie Olivere Biden, politician, widow of Beau Biden and daughter-in-law of Joe Biden
  - Charizma, rapper (d. 1993)
  - John R. Connolly, politician
  - William Lee Scott, actor
- July 7
  - Aaron Beasley, football player
  - Troy Garity, actor
- July 9
  - Katasha Artis, basketball player
  - Brook Berringer, football player (d. 1996)
  - Kelly Holcomb, football player
  - Enrique Murciano, actor
  - Pete Parada, musician
- July 10
  - Mo Cassara, basketball player and coach
  - Michael Clark, boxer
  - Annie Mumolo, actress, screenwriter, comedian and producer
- July 11
  - Link Abrams, American-born New Zealand basketball player
  - Adam Alexander, sportscaster
  - Andrew Bird, violinist and singer/songwriter
  - Kris Steele, politician
- July 12
  - Jay Ashcroft, attorney, engineer, and politician
  - David Blixt, actor and author
- July 13 – Necro Butcher, wrestler
- July 14
  - Alley Baggett, model and makeup artist
  - Monoxide Child, rapper and member of Twiztid
- July 15
  - Jason Paul Collum, filmmaker
  - Brian Austin Green, actor
- July 16
  - Jay Bateman, football player and coach
  - Robert Jayne, actor, real estate agent, and blackjack player
  - Graham Robertson, filmmaker and author
  - Tim Ryan, politician
  - Alan Wilson, politician
- July 17
  - Midwin Charles, attorney (d. 2021)
  - Ken Martin, political figure
  - Eric Moulds, football player
  - Liam Kyle Sullivan, comedian
  - Amy Steinberg, minister, singer, songwriter, musician, playwright and actress
- July 18
  - Brian Sidney Bembridge, scenic and lighting designer
  - Josh A. Cassada, physicist, test pilot, and NASA astronaut
- July 19
  - Marcy Borders, legal assistant and survivor of the 9/11 attack (d. 2015)
  - Damon Centola, sociologist and University professor
  - Raja Krishnamoorthi, Indian-born politician
  - Saïd Taghmaoui, French-born actor and screenwriter
- July 20
  - Keith Aldridge, ice hockey player
  - David Chalian, journalist and political analyst
  - Omar Epps, actor, rapper, and producer
- July 21
  - Brian Buchanan, baseball player
  - Ali Landry, actress
  - Steve Taneyhill, American football player and businessman (d. 2025)
- July 22
  - Paul Ceglia, fugitive
  - Brian Chippendale, musician and drummer
  - Petey Pablo, rapper and record producer
  - Rufus Wainwright, American-born Canadian singer/songwriter and composer
- July 23
  - Shannon Brown, country singer
  - Nomar Garciaparra, baseball player
  - Monica Lewinsky, former White House intern
- July 24
  - Andy Barr, politician
  - Jamie Denbo, actress
- July 25
  - David Denman, actor
  - Tony Vincent, actor and singer
- July 27
  - Kenji Bunch, composer and violist
  - Cassandra Clare, author
  - Abe Cunningham, drummer for Deftones
- July 28
  - Scott Bloom, actor and filmmaker
  - Jon Coffman, basketball player and coach
- July 29
  - Lorraine Besser, philosopher and university professor
  - Roy Colsey, lacrosse player
  - Stephen Dorff, actor
  - Wanya Morris, singer
  - Dileep Rao, actor
- July 30
  - Neel Kashkari, banker, economist, and politician
  - Clementa C. Pinckney, pastor and politician (d. 2015)
- July 31
  - Jason Archer, artist
  - Troy Carter, plasma physicist and University professor

=== August ===
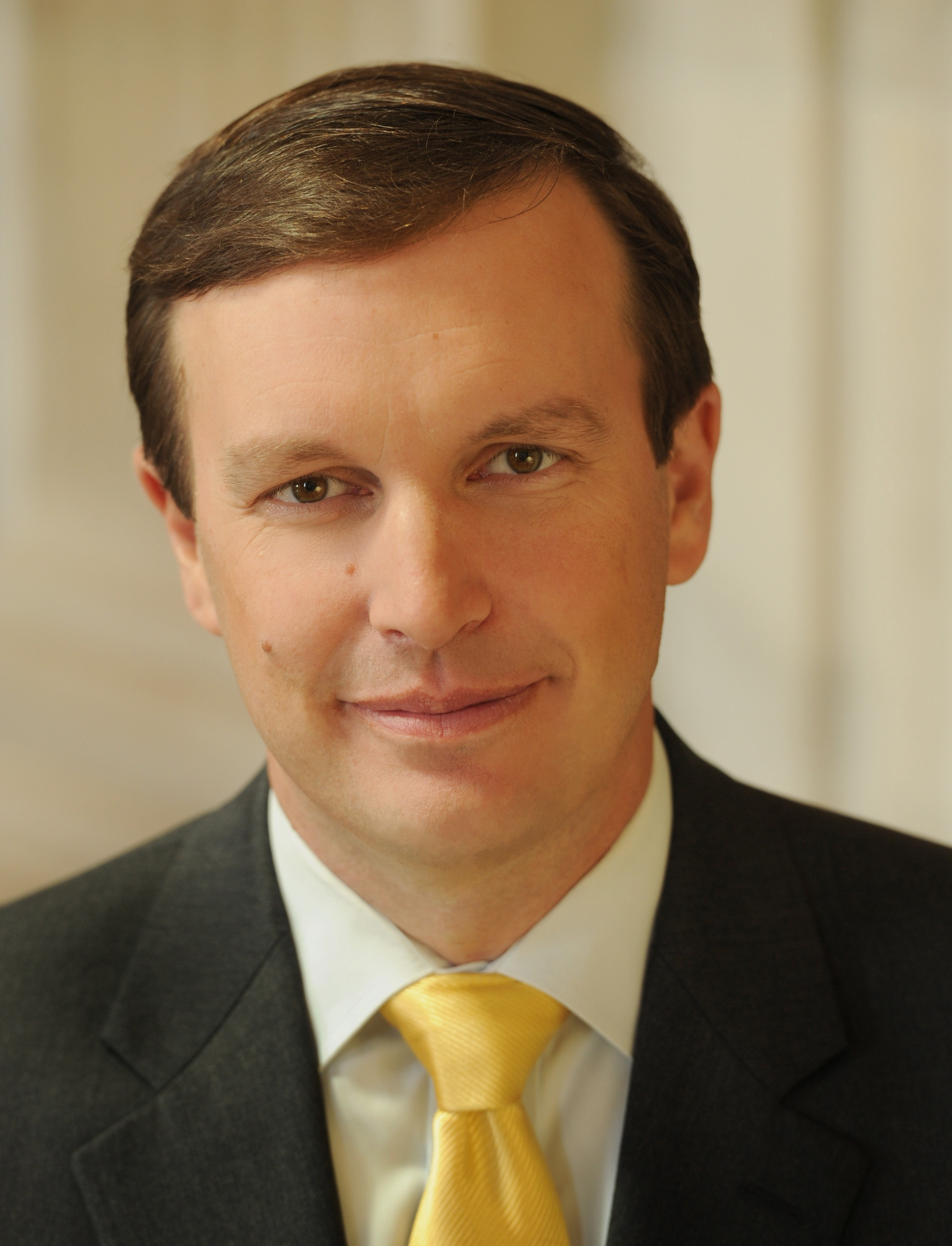
Chris Murphy

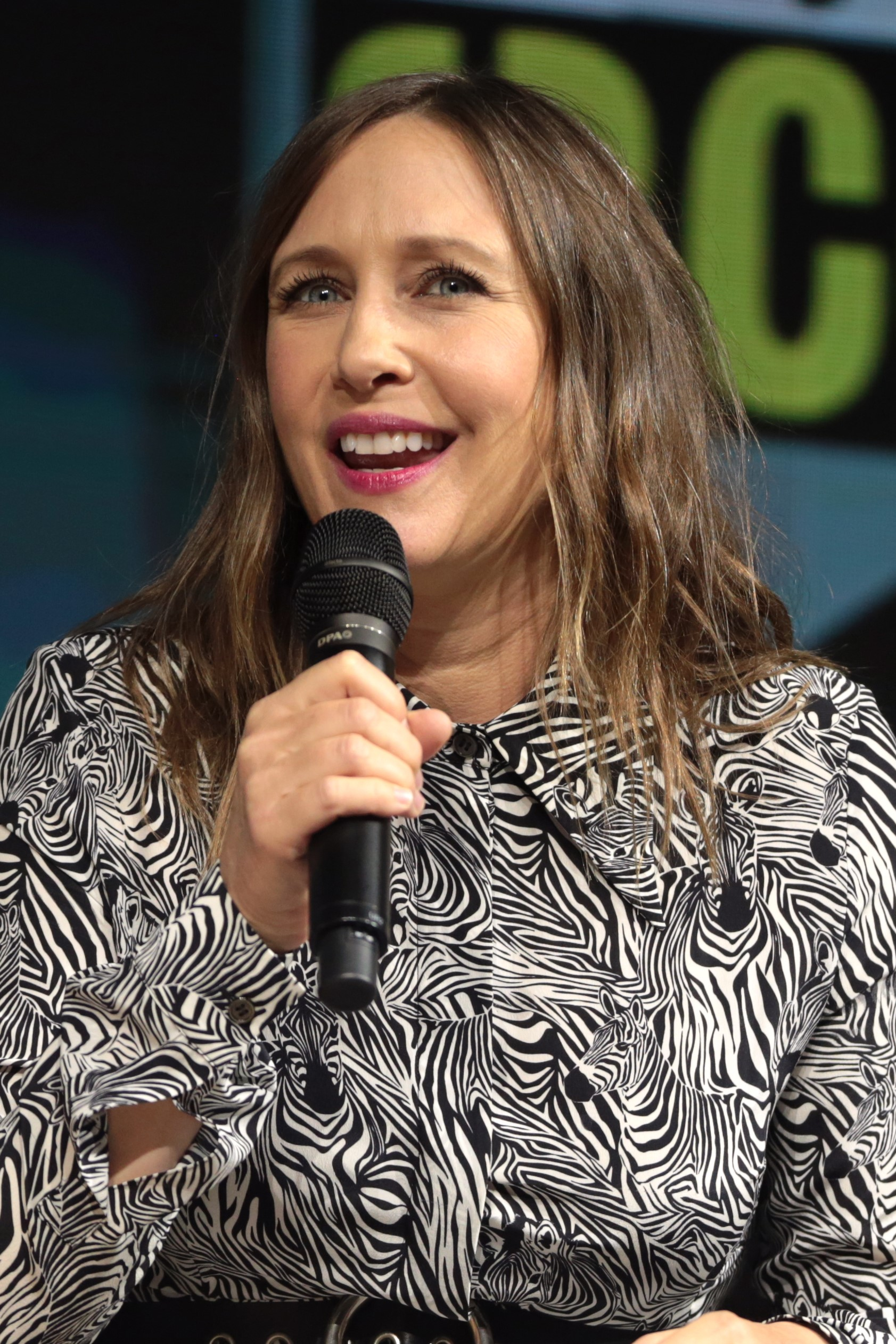
Vera Farmiga

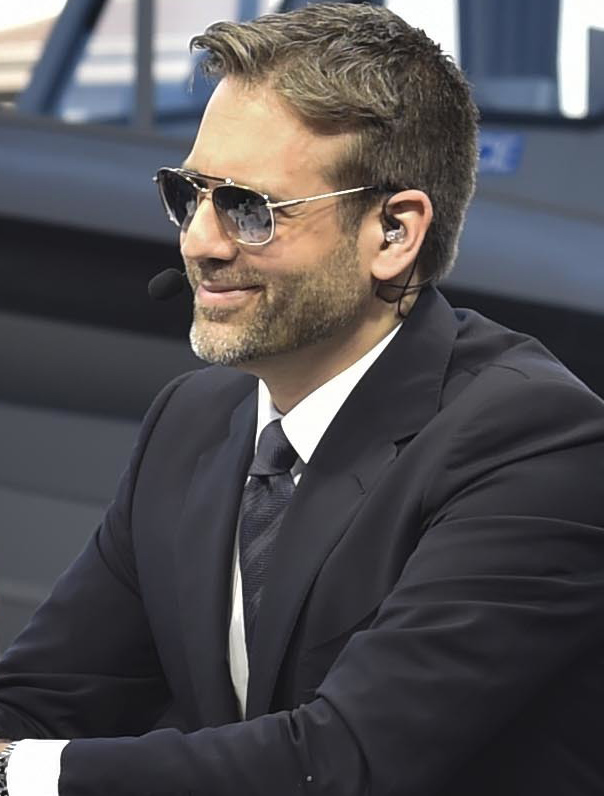
Max Kellerman

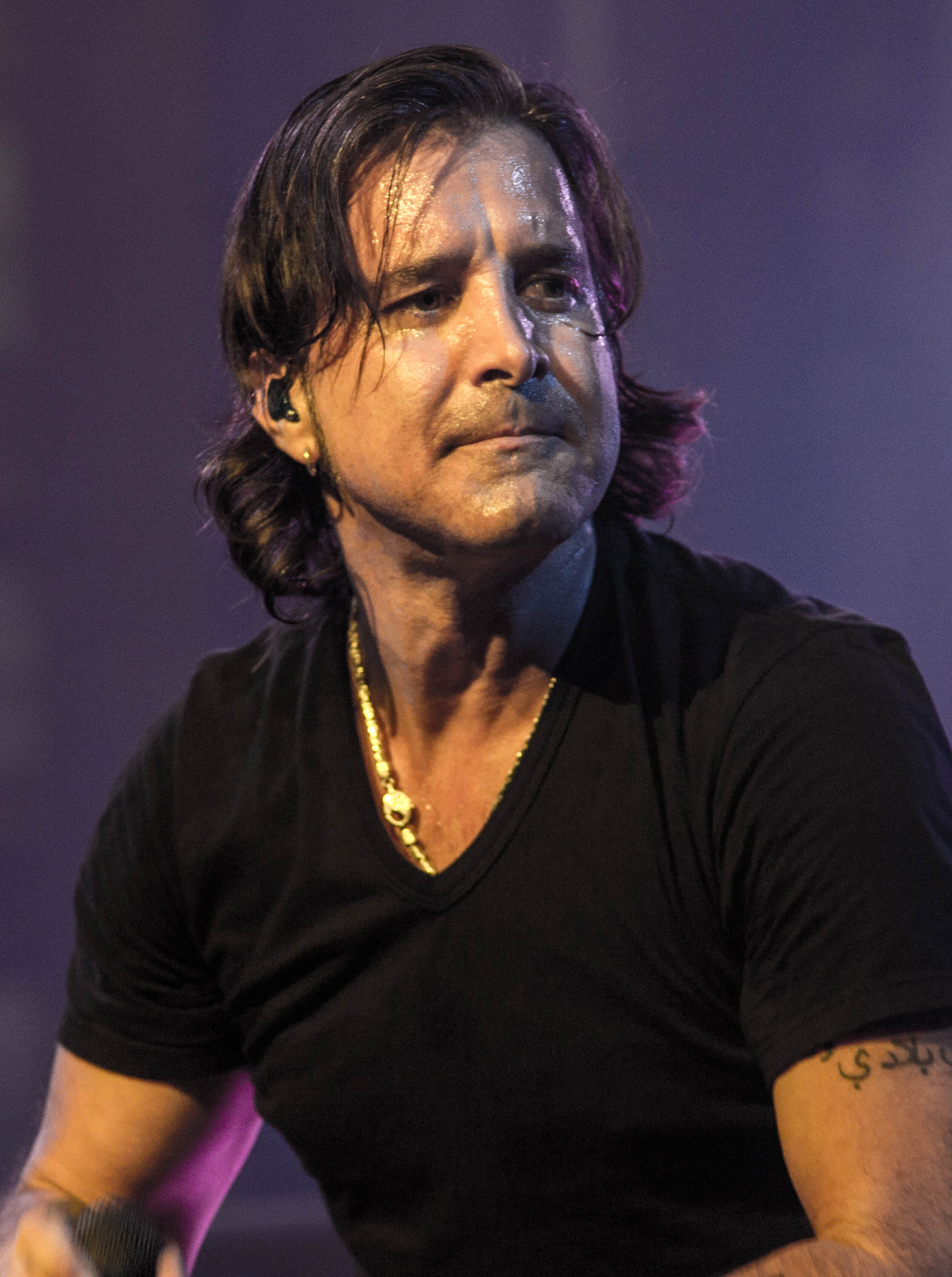
Scott Stapp

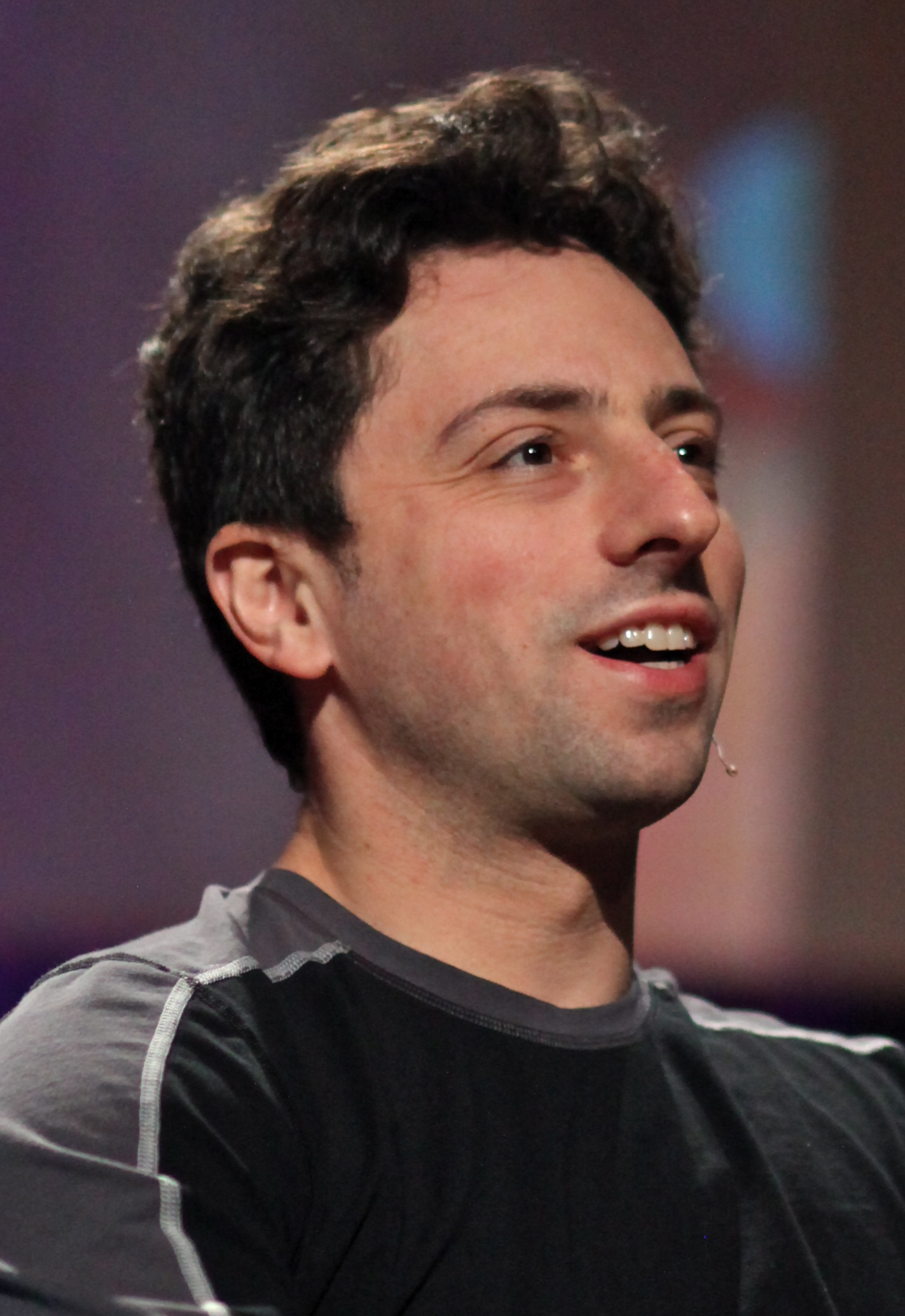
Sergey Brin

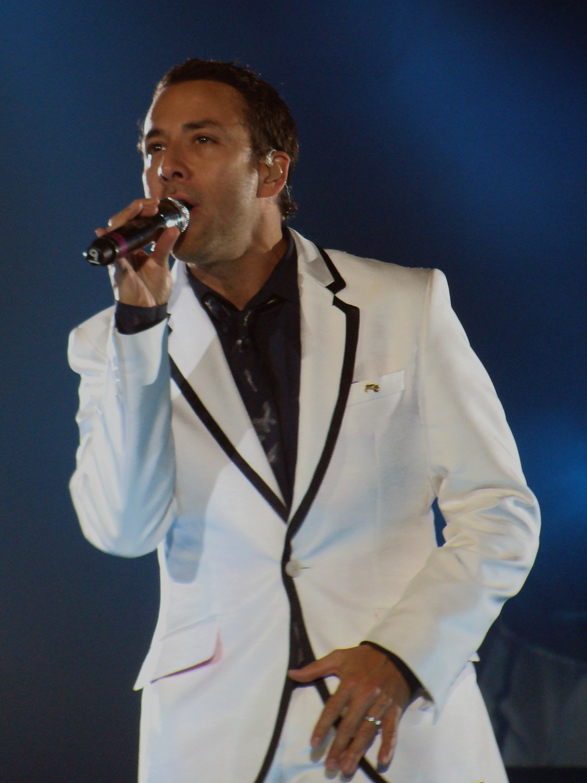
Howie D.

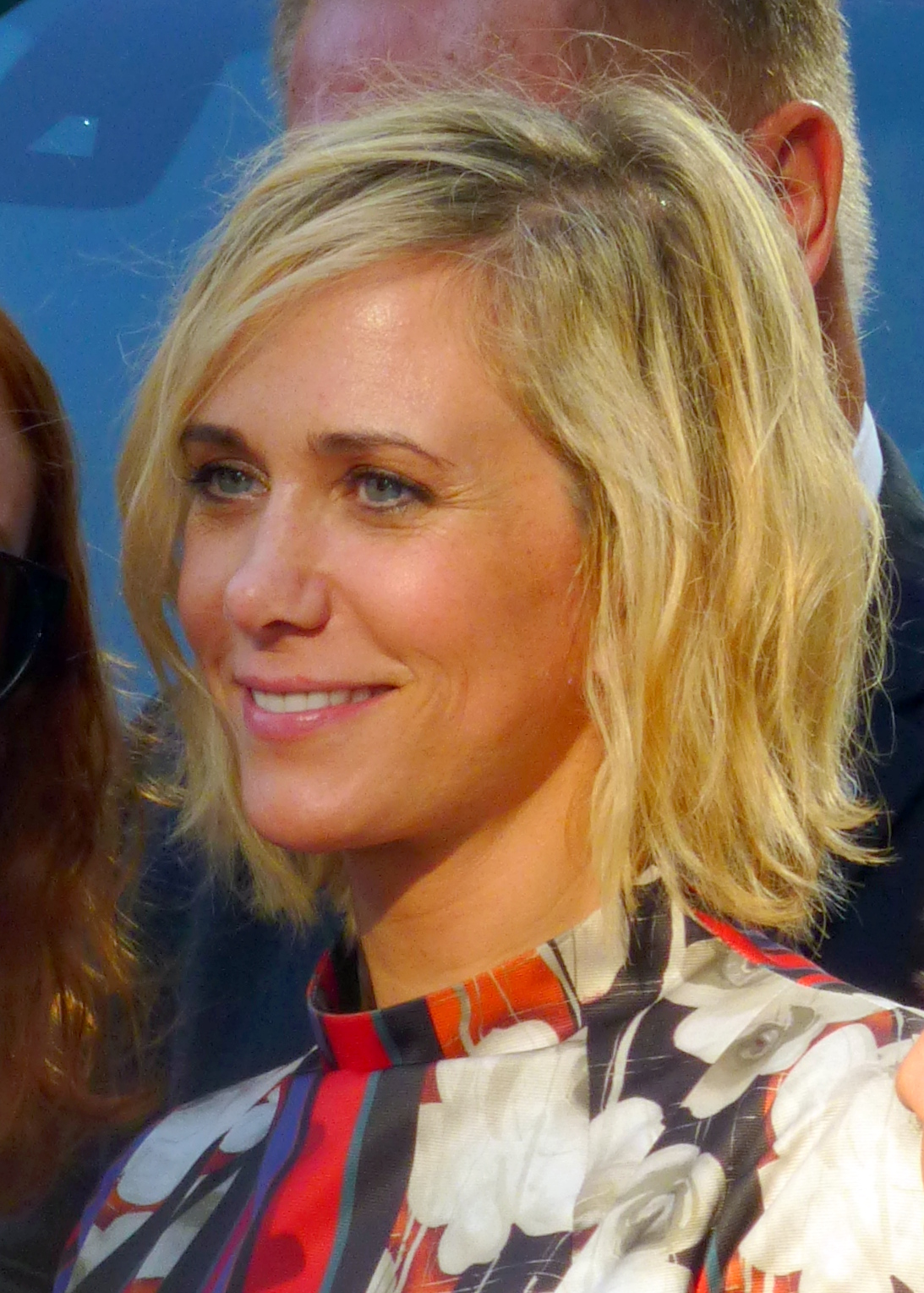
Kristen Wiig

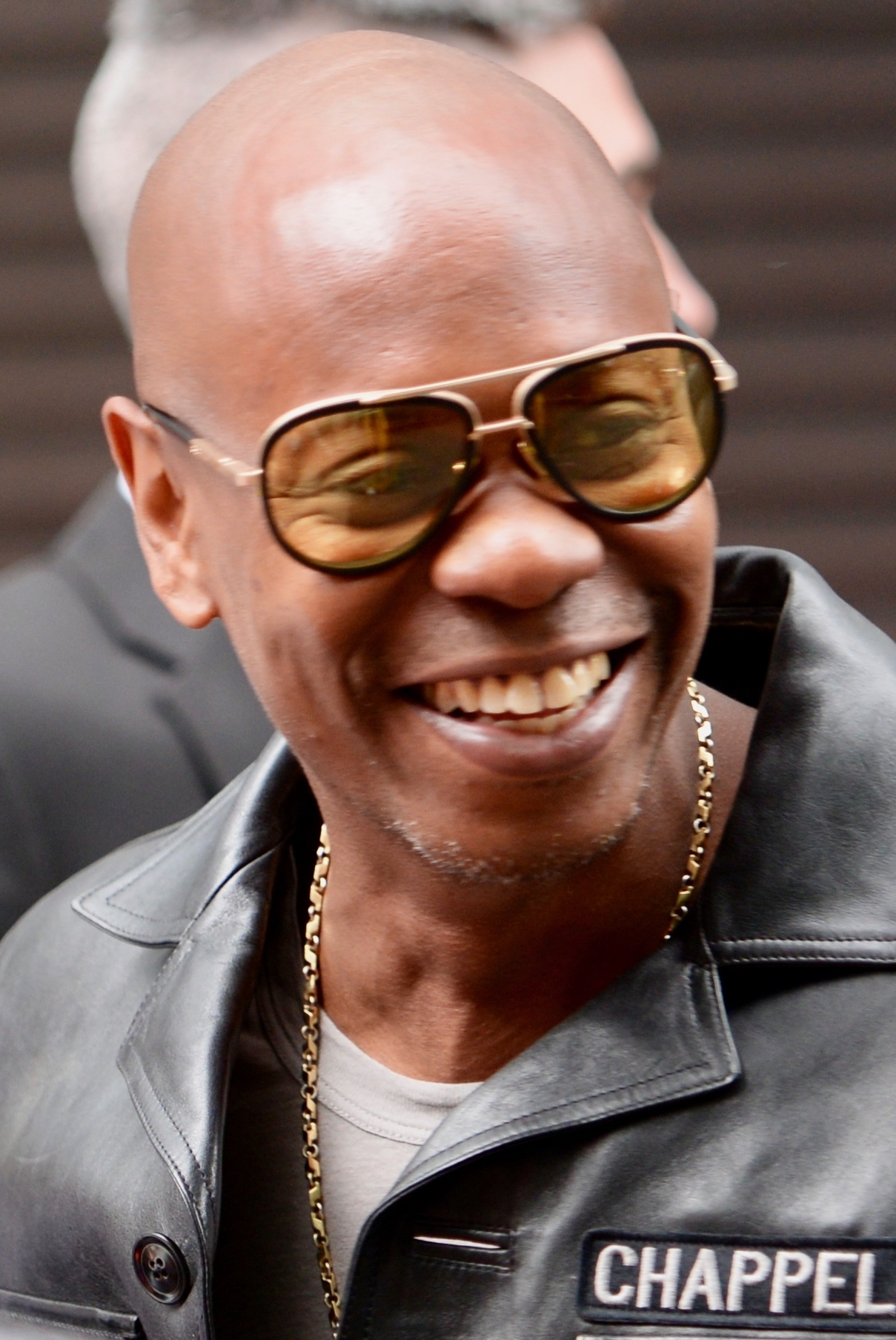
Dave Chappelle

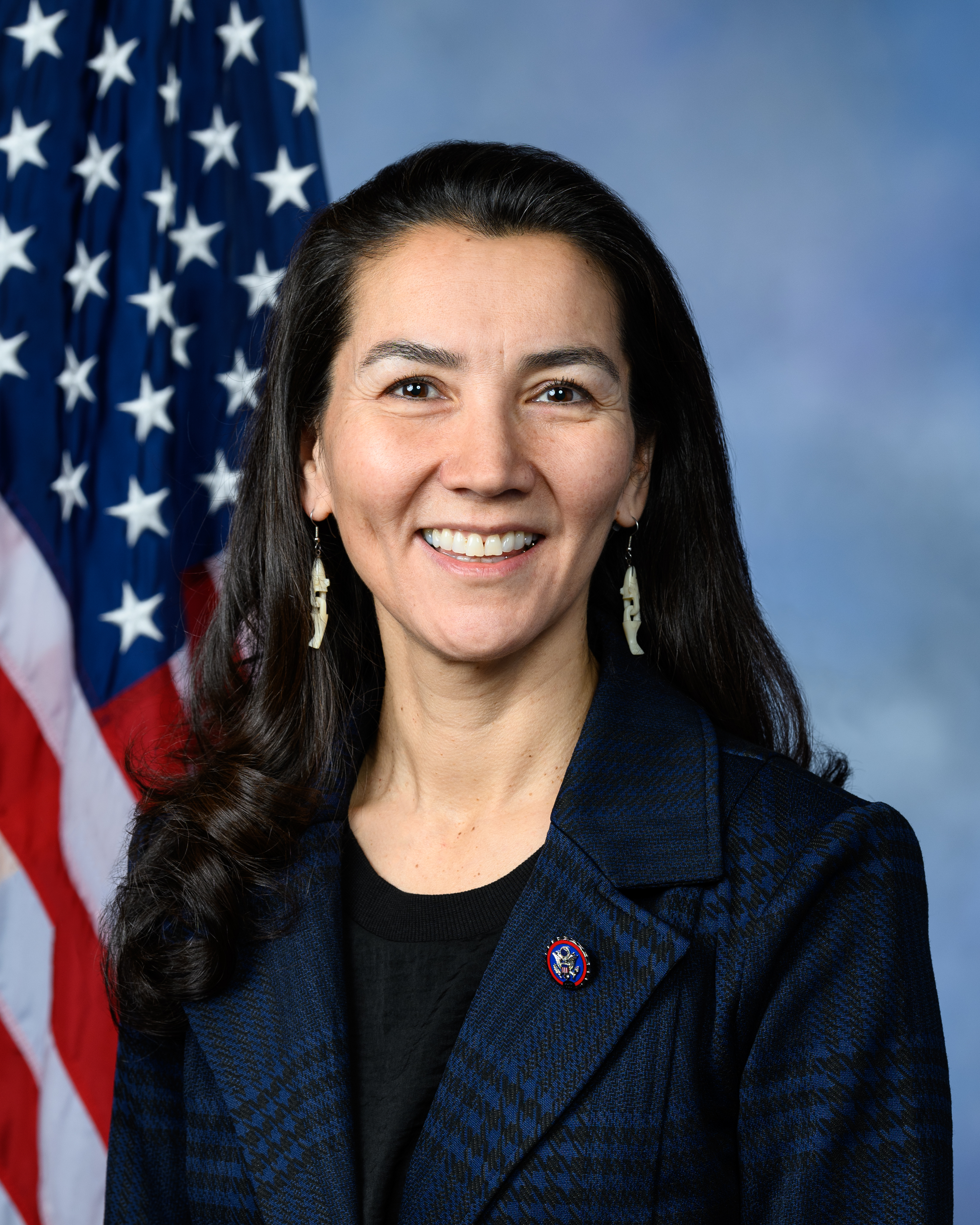
Mary Peltola

- August 1
  - Mario Bennett, basketball player
  - Gregg Berhalter, soccer player and coach
  - Tempestt Bledsoe, actress
  - Craig Carpenito, lawyer
- August 2
  - Dan Boren, politician
  - Simon Kinberg, British-born filmmaker
- August 3
  - Flynn Adam, producer, singer, and rapper
  - Chadd Cassidy, ice hockey player and coach
  - Jay Cutler, bodybuilder
  - Chris Murphy, politician
- August 4
  - Eddie Cade, football player
  - S. A. Cosby, author
- August 5
  - Lorri Bagley, actress and model
  - Michael Hollick, actor
- August 6
  - Asia Carrera, actress
  - Cal Cunningham, politician and Army Lt. Colonel
  - Vera Farmiga, actress
  - Karenna Gore, daughter of Al Gore
  - Max Kellerman, sportscaster and radio host
- August 7
  - Tom Asimou, lawyer
  - Ross Atkins, baseball player and executive
  - Michael Barnes, judoka
- August 8
  - Jessica Calvello, voice actress
  - Senta Moses, actress
  - Scott Stapp, singer/songwriter and frontman for Creed
- August 9
  - Juan Alvarez, baseball player
  - Brian Baker, politician (d. 2021)
  - Kenya Barris, writer, producer, director, and actor
- August 11
  - Kristin Armstrong, cyclist
  - Andy Bloom, Olympic shot putter
  - Frank Caeti, actor
  - Tackey Chan, politician
  - Carolyn Murphy, model
- August 12
  - Latasha Byears, basketball player
  - Jonathan Coachman, sports media personality
- August 13 – Molly Henneberg, news reporter
- August 14
  - Jacob Brent, actor
  - Wayne Chrebet, football player
- August 15
  - Caleb Chapman, bandleader and musician
  - Kris Mangum, football player
- August 16
  - Hector Balderas, lawyer and politician
  - Dan Cross, basketball player
  - Damian Jackson, baseball player
- August 17
  - David Bromstad, designer and television personality
  - Adam Butler, baseball player
  - Rae Carson, writer
- August 18 – James Cregg, football coach
- August 19
  - Ahmed Best, actor, comedian, and musician
  - Clayton Counts, musician and DJ (d. 2016)
- August 20 – Todd Helton, baseball player
- August 21
  - Sergey Brin, Russian-born computer scientist, Internet entrepreneur, co-founder of Google, and CEO of Alphabet, Inc. (2015–2019)
  - Lou Collier, baseball player
- August 22
  - John Badalamenti, lawyer and judge
  - William D. Burns, politician
  - Howie D., singer and member of the Backstreet Boys
  - Angel Campos, MLB umpire
  - Craig Greenberg, politician, mayor of Louisville, Kentucky (2023–present)
  - Heidi Lenhart, actress
  - Kristen Wiig, actress, comedian, writer and producer
- August 23
  - Casey Blake, baseball player
  - Chelsi Smith, actress, singer, television host, and beauty queen (d. 2018)
- August 24
  - Scott Blasi, horse trainer
  - Dave Chappelle, actor and comedian
  - Grey DeLisle, voice actress and singer
  - Carmine Giovinazzo, actor
- August 25 – Count Bass D, rapper
- August 26 – Mark Budzinski, baseball player and coach
- August 27 – Anthony Chiasson, hedge fund manager and co-founder of Level Global Investors LP
- August 28
  - Matthew John Armstrong, actor
  - J. August Richards, actor
- August 29
  - Chuck Clements, football player
  - Jason Spisak, actor, voice actor, and producer
- August 30
  - Beth Bader, golfer
  - Lisa Ling, journalist
- August 31
  - Doug Anderson, Christian singer
  - Johanny Cepeda-Freytiz, businesswoman and politician
  - Mary Peltola, politician

=== September ===
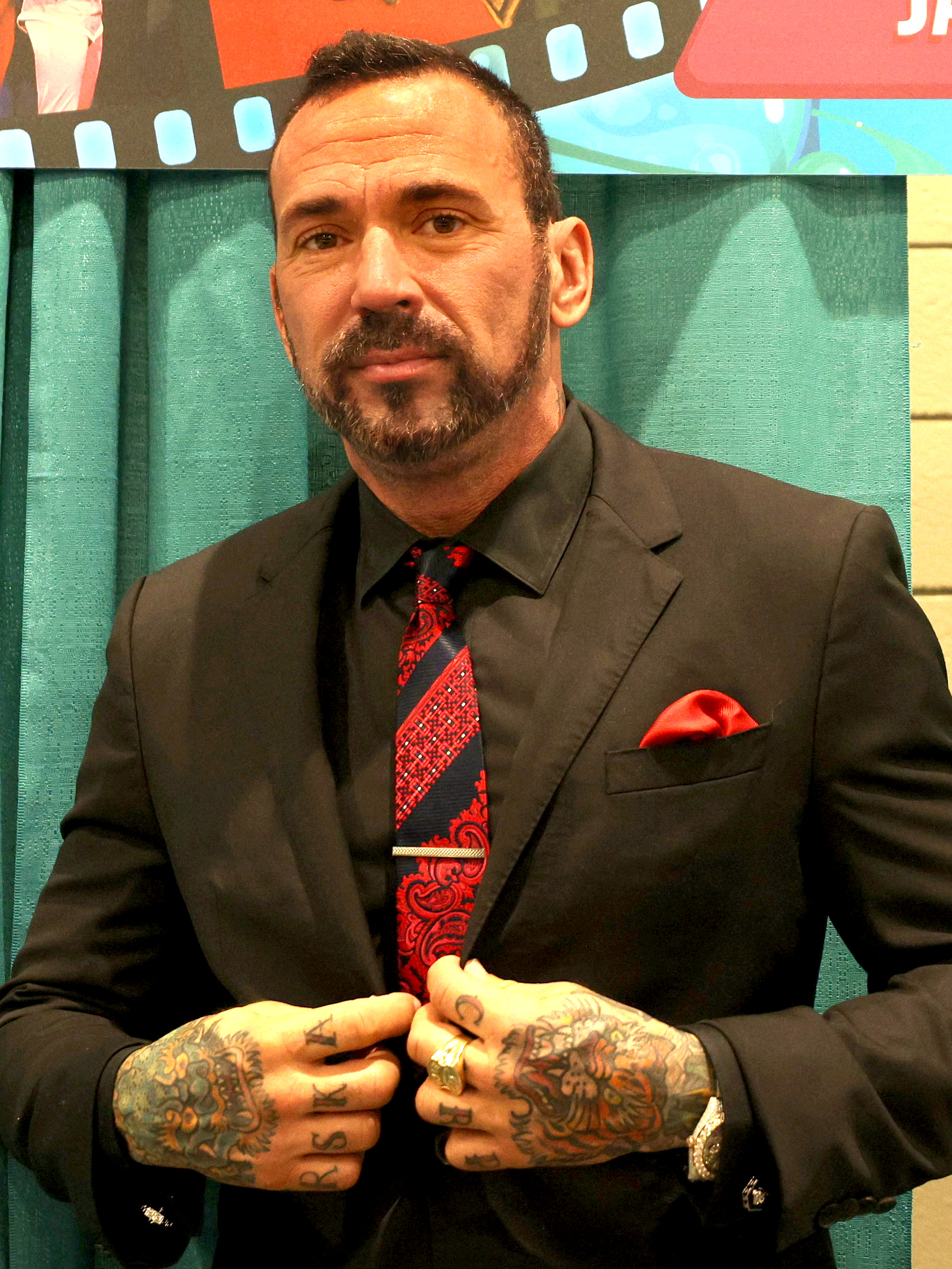
Jason David Frank

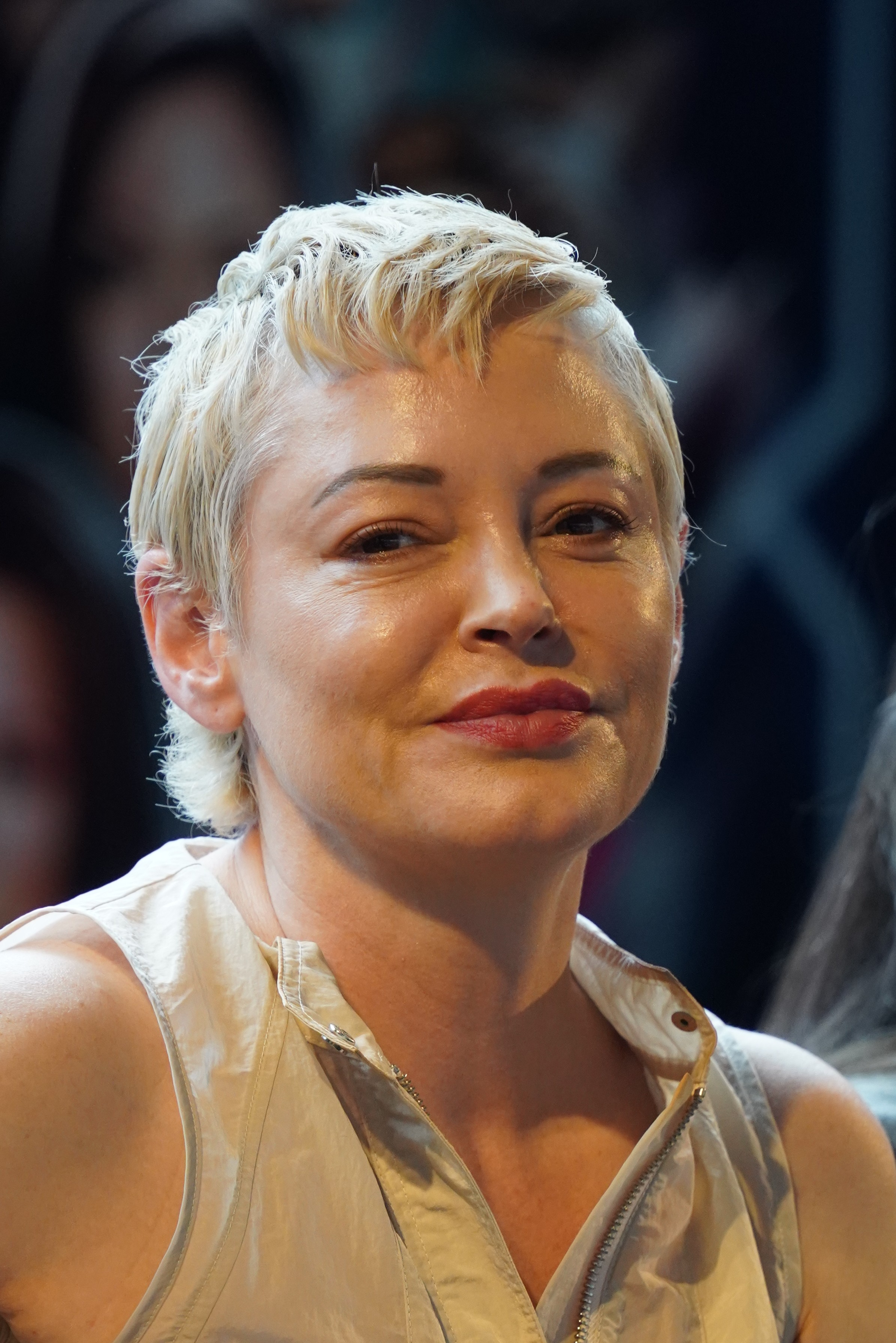
Rose McGowan

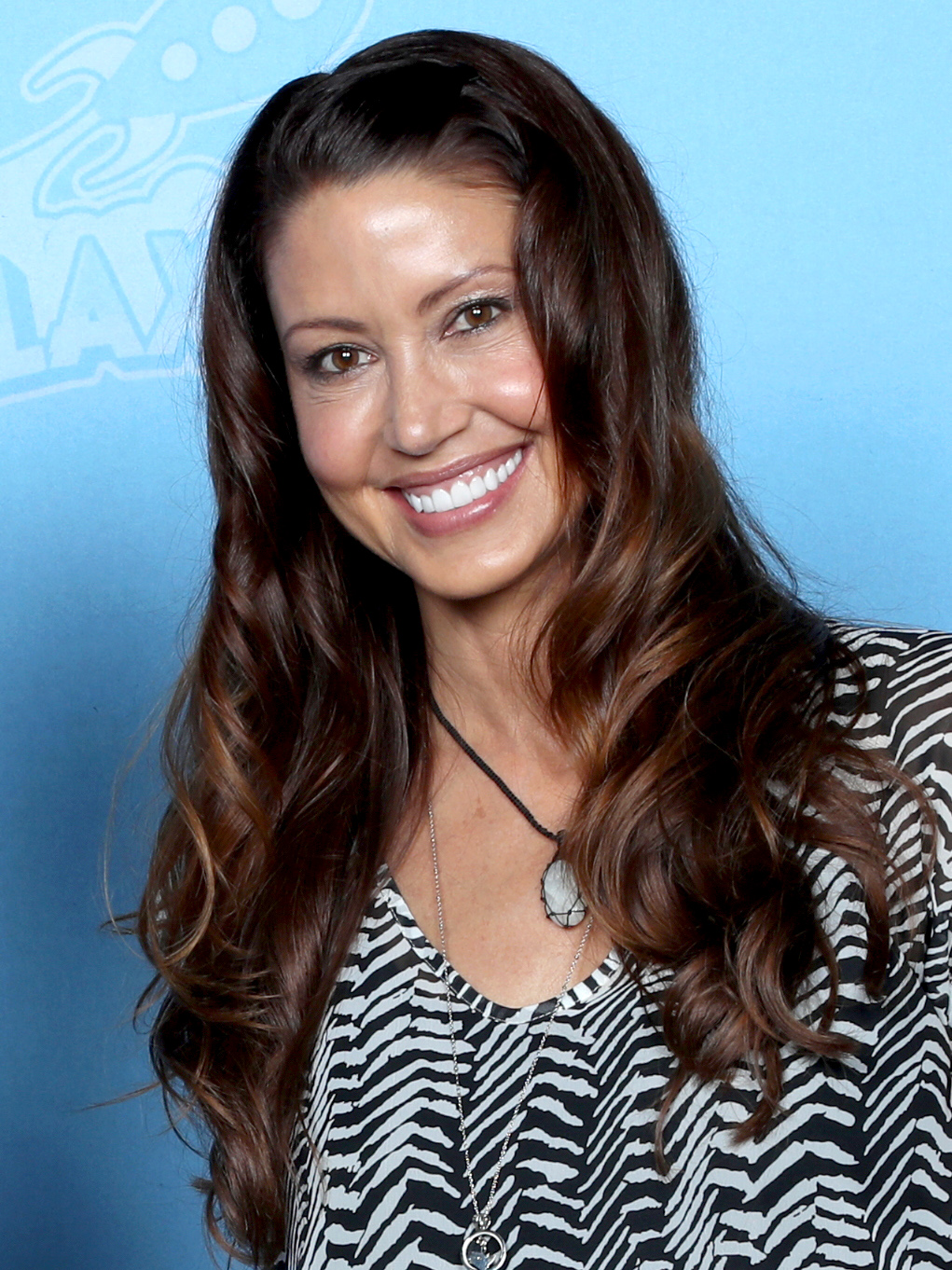
Shannon Elizabeth

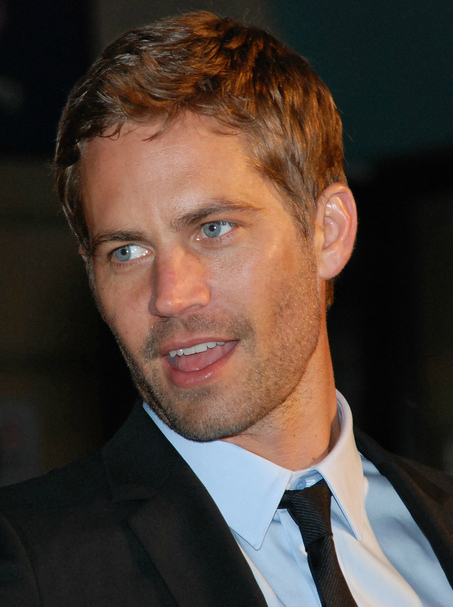
Paul Walker

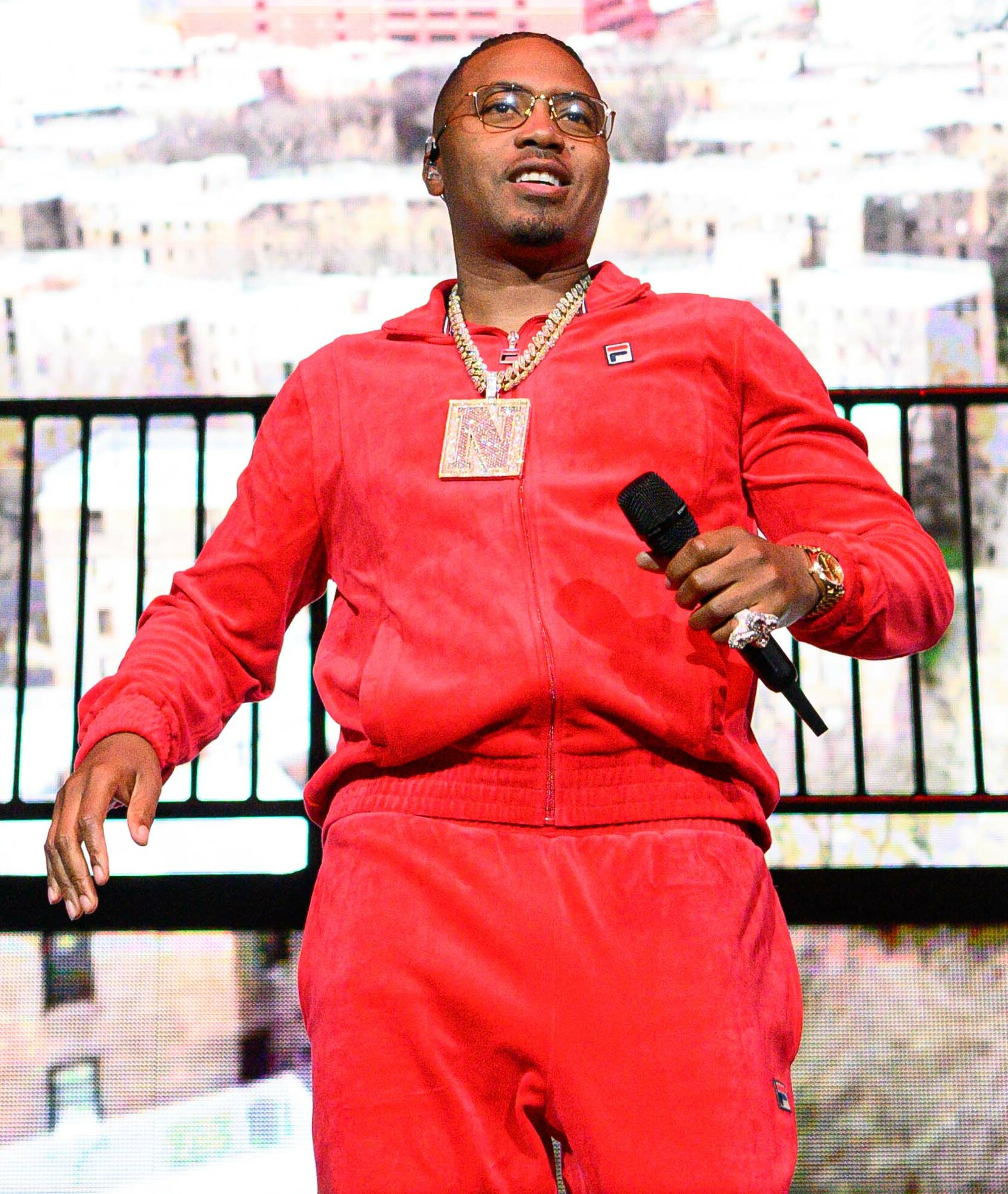
Nas

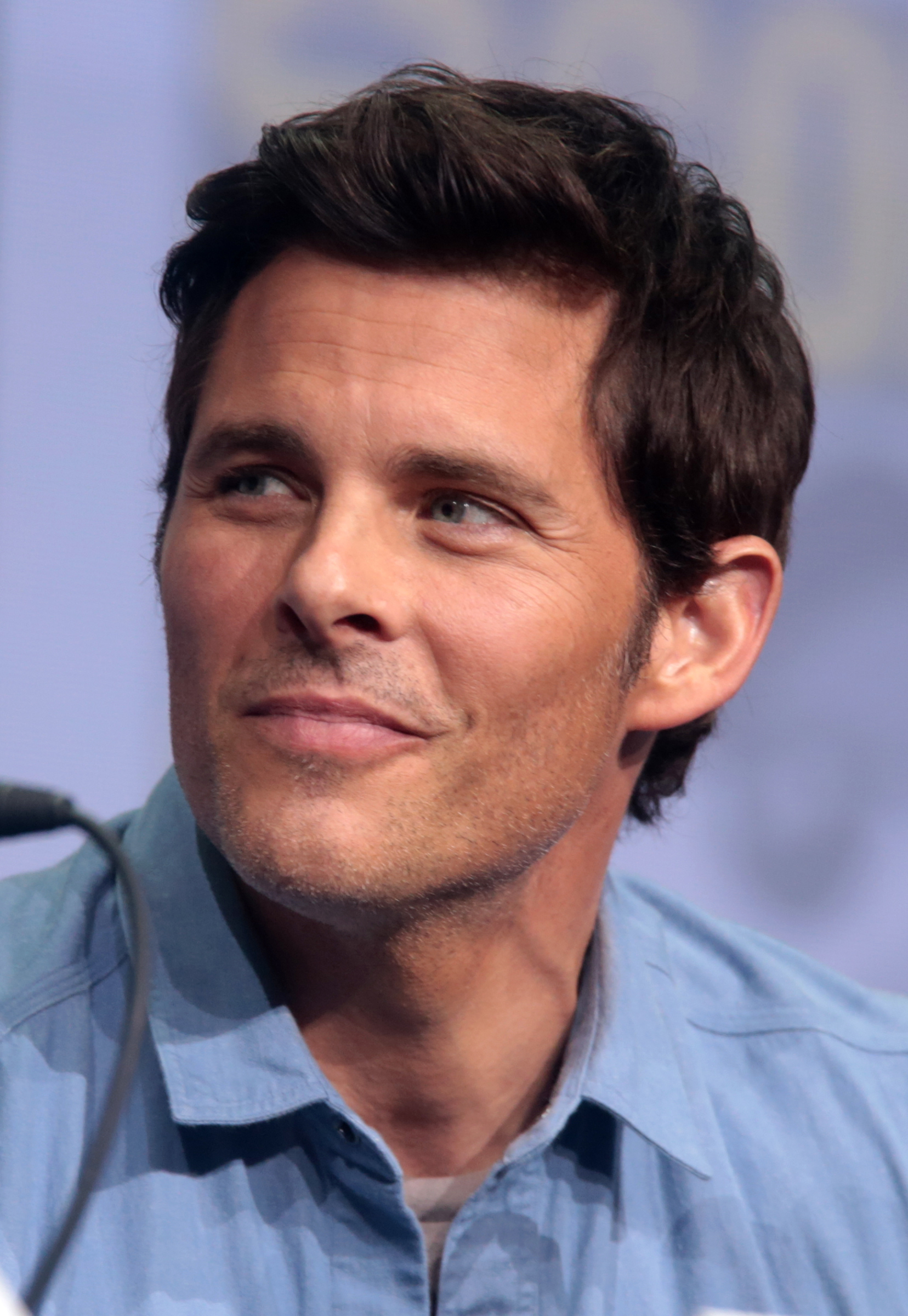
James Marsden

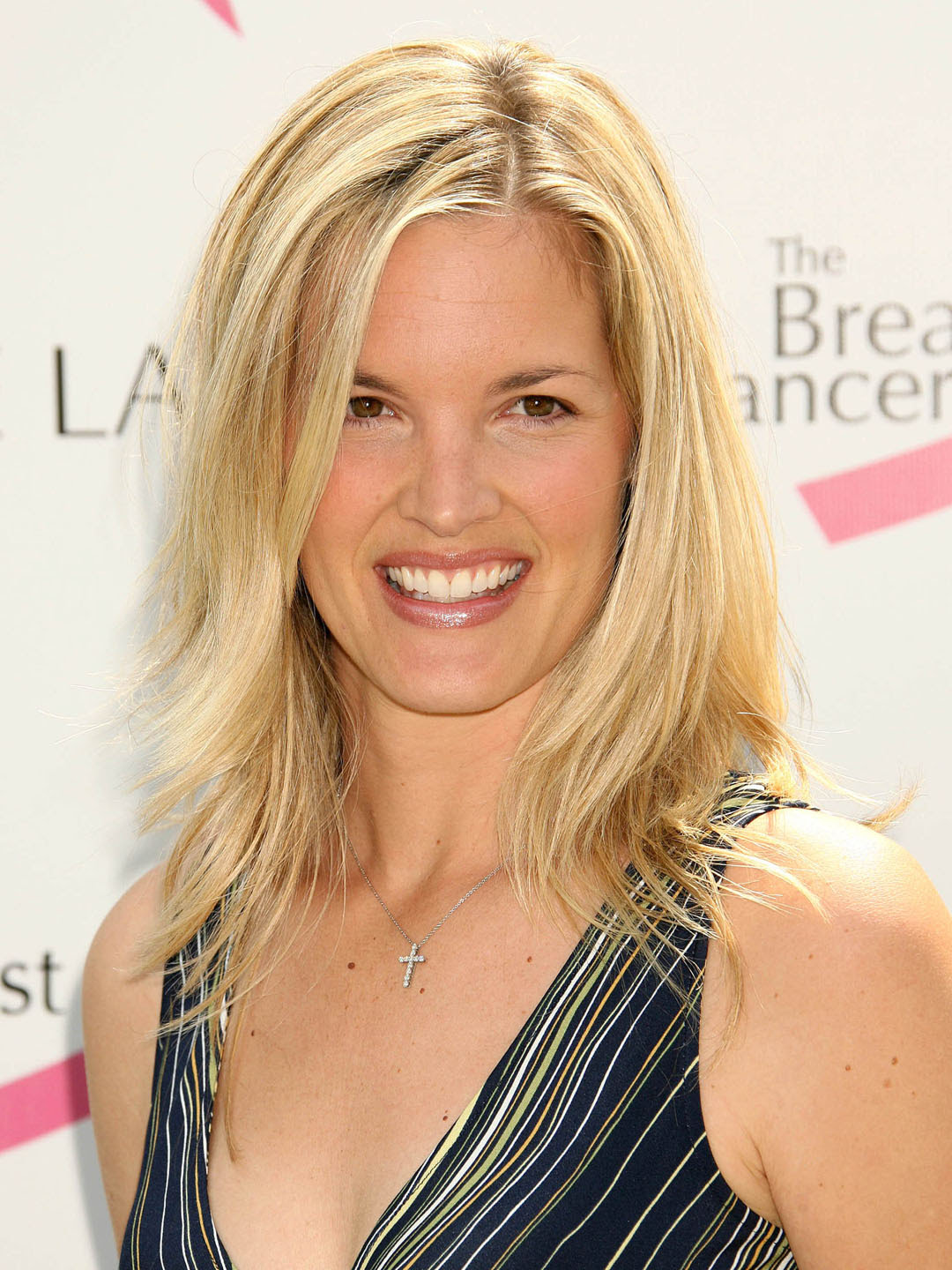
Bridgette Wilson-Sampras

- September 1
  - Sanford Bookstaver, director and producer
  - Gillian Boxx, softball player
  - Troy Brownfield, comic book writer, journalist, and college professor
- September 2
  - Curtis Anderson, football player
  - Jason Blake, ice hockey player
  - Donnie Boyce, basketball player and coach
- September 3 – Alexandra Kerry, actress, filmmaker, director, and producer
- September 4 – Jason David Frank, actor (d. 2022)
- September 5
  - Justin Atchley, baseball player
  - Rose McGowan, actress
- September 6 – Merika Coleman, politician
- September 7
  - Reuben Brigety, politician and diplomat
  - Kendrick Burton, football player
  - Shannon Elizabeth, actress
- September 8
  - Jordan Crane, cartoonist
  - Troy Sanders, singer and bassist for Mastodon and Killer Be Killed
- September 9
  - John Blackwell, musician (d. 2017)
  - Jennie Kwan, actress and voice actress
  - Dave Schubert, artist and photographer (d. 2023)
- September 10
  - Chris Bortz, politician
  - Colleen V. Chien, legal scholar and University professor
- September 11
  - Robby Albarado, jockey
  - Glen Bradley, politician
- September 12
  - Vashone Adams, football player
  - Tarana Burke, civil rights activist and founder of the MeToo movement
  - Ki-Jana Carter, football player
  - Paul Walker, actor (d. 2013)
- September 13 – Aaron Benward, singer/songwriter, actor, and producer
- September 14
  - Travis Allen, politician
  - Dominique Arnold, hurdler
  - Tony Bui, Vietnamese-born filmmaker
  - Nas, rapper
- September 15
  - Markita Aldridge, basketball player
  - Kaela Berg, politician
  - Jonathan Eusebio, Canadian-born director, stunt coordinator, martial artist, and actor
- September 17 – Keirsten Alley, tennis player
- September 18
  - Paul Anderson, politician
  - Towanda Braxton, singer
  - James Marsden, actor
- September 19 – Amil, rapper
- September 20
  - Brad Beyer, actor
  - Todd Boehly, businessman and investor
  - Michael Raymond Chapman, writer, voice actor, director, animator, producer, and composer
- September 21
  - Mike Anderson, football player
  - Derek and Keith Brewer, models and twin brothers
  - Z Brewer, writer
  - Kevin Carter, football player
- September 22 – Bob Sapp, wrestler, actor, football player, kickboxer, and mixed martial artist
- September 23 – Al Cisneros, singer, bassist, and frontman for Sleep and Om
- September 24
  - Diana Ayala, politician
  - Eddie George, football player
- September 25
  - Julie Banderas, news anchor
  - Bridget Marquardt, television personality and model
  - Bridgette Wilson-Sampras, actress
- September 26
  - Marty Casey, singer, guitarist, and frontman for Lovehammers
  - Aric Cushing, actor and writer
- September 29 – Joe Hulbig, ice hockey player
- September 30
  - Tisha Terrasini Banker, actress
  - John Browning, football player
  - David Ury, actor

=== October ===
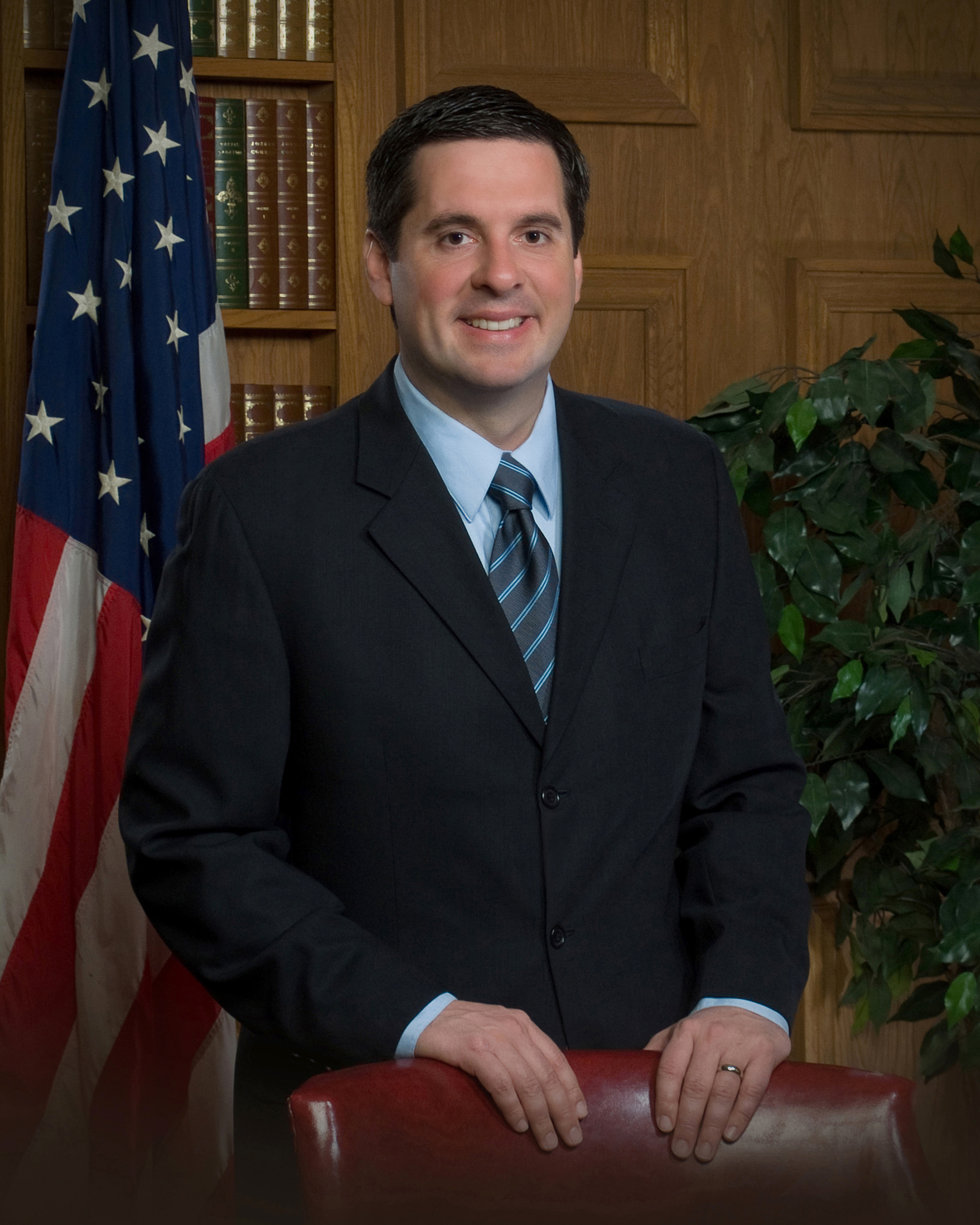
Devin Nunes

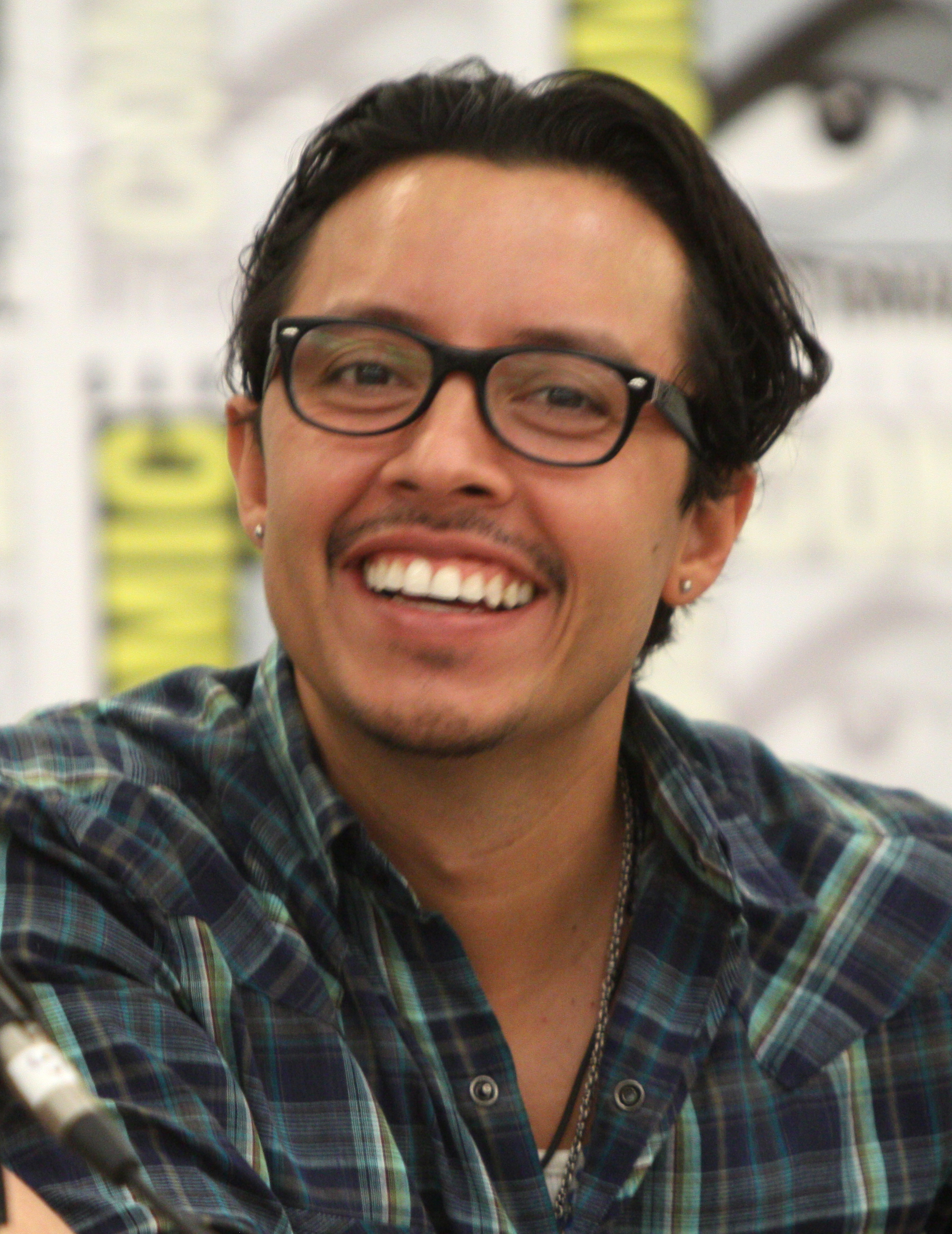
Efren Ramirez

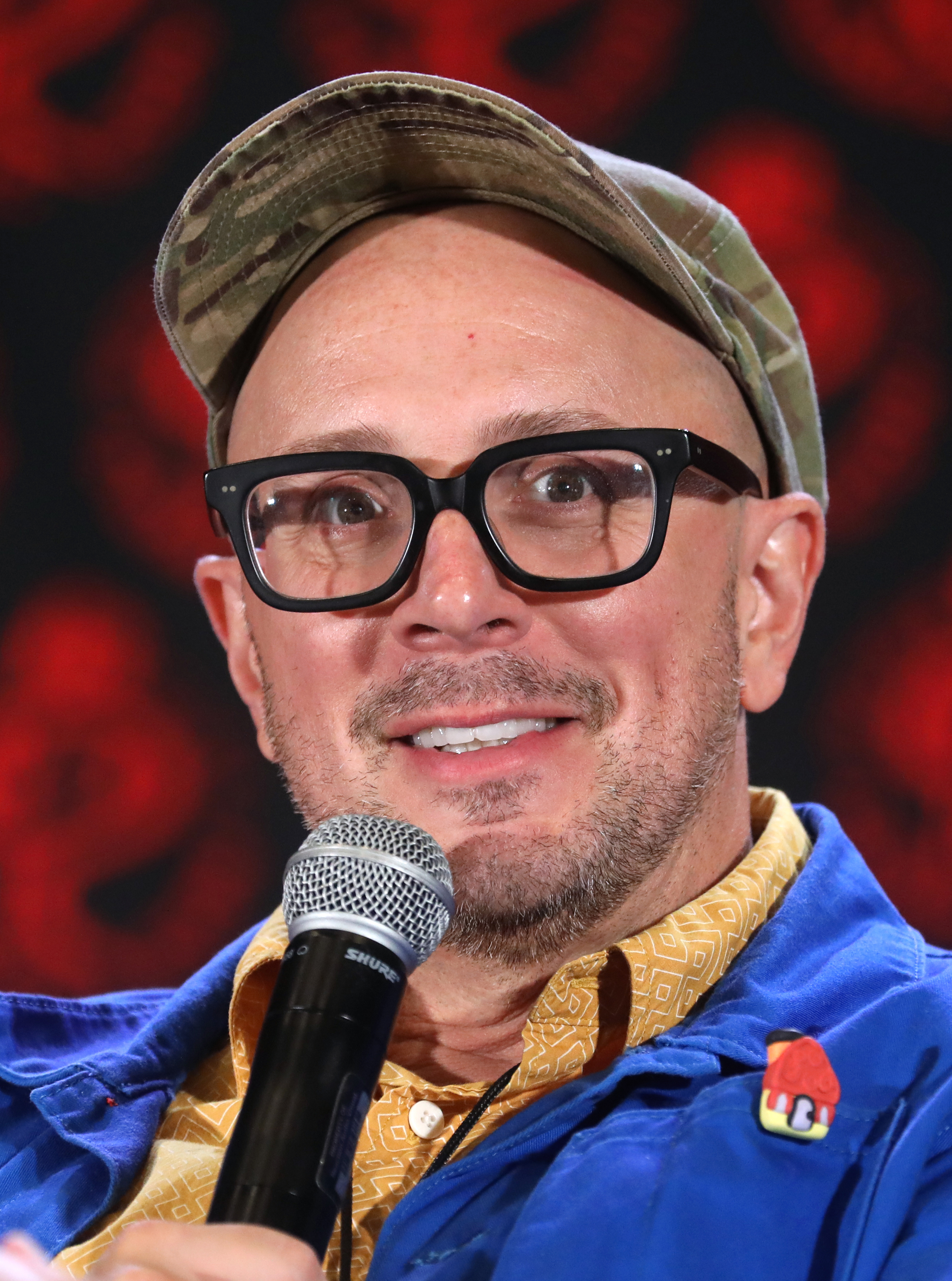
Steve Burns

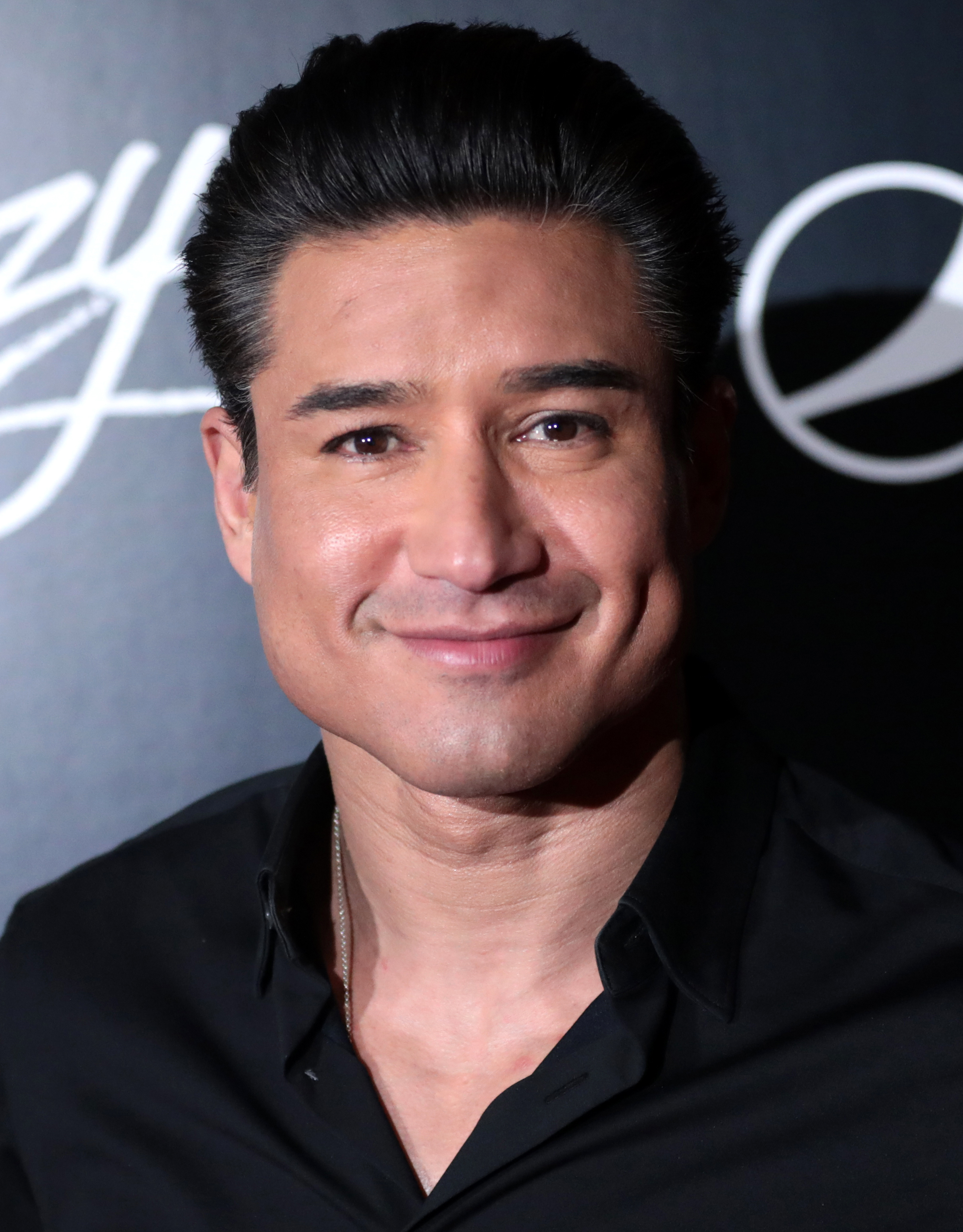
Mario Lopez

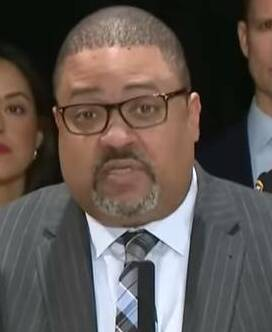
Alvin Bragg

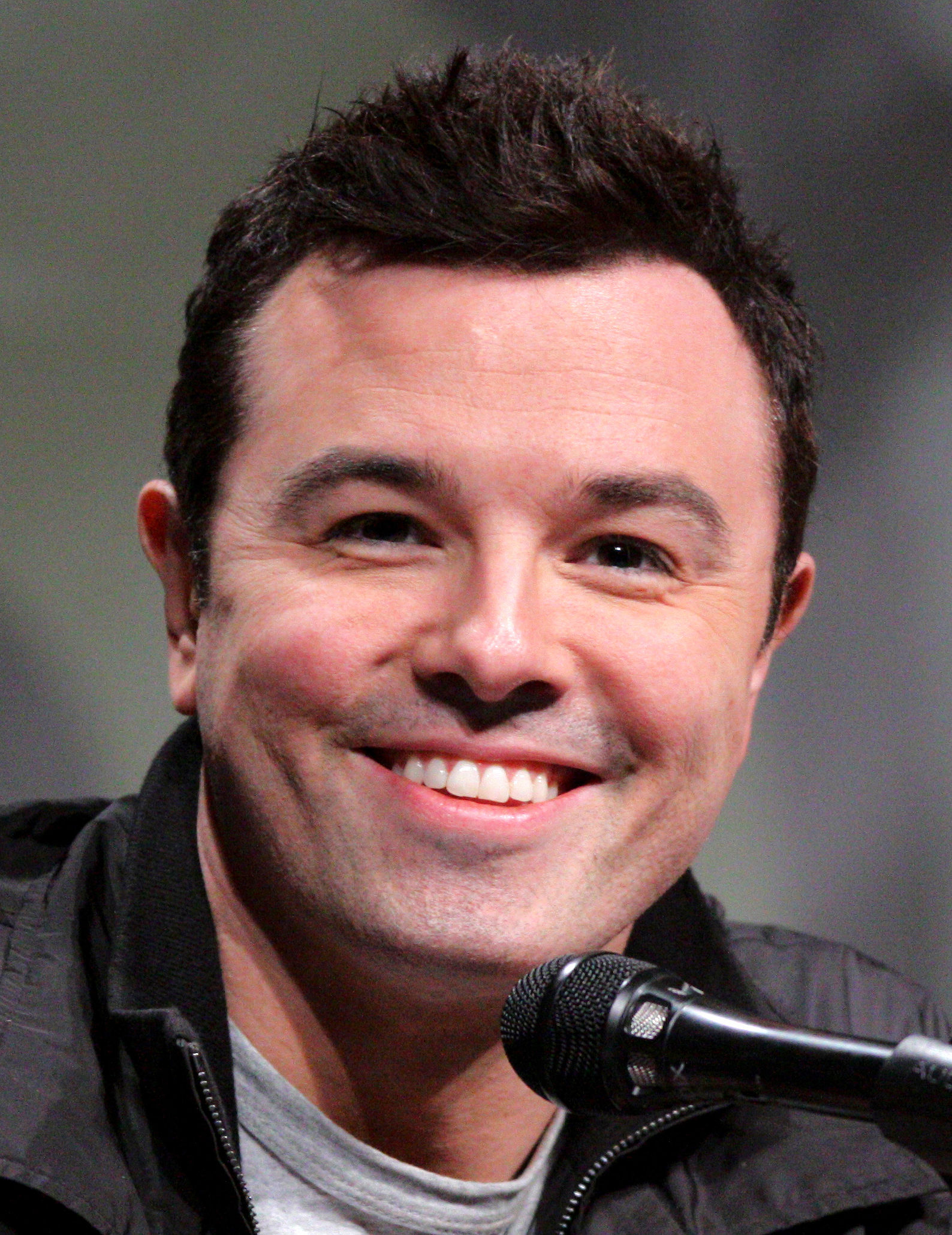
Seth MacFarlane

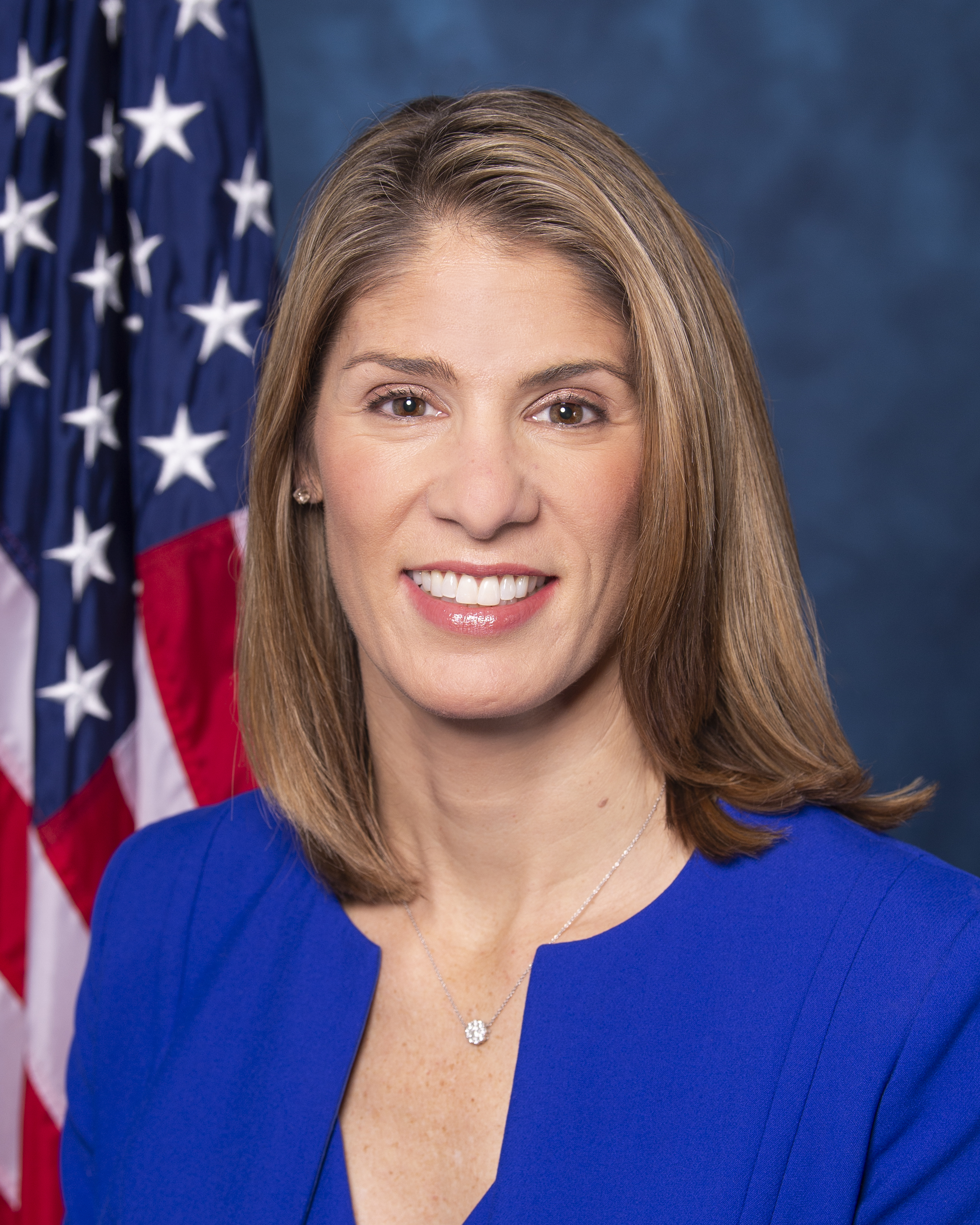
Lori Trahan

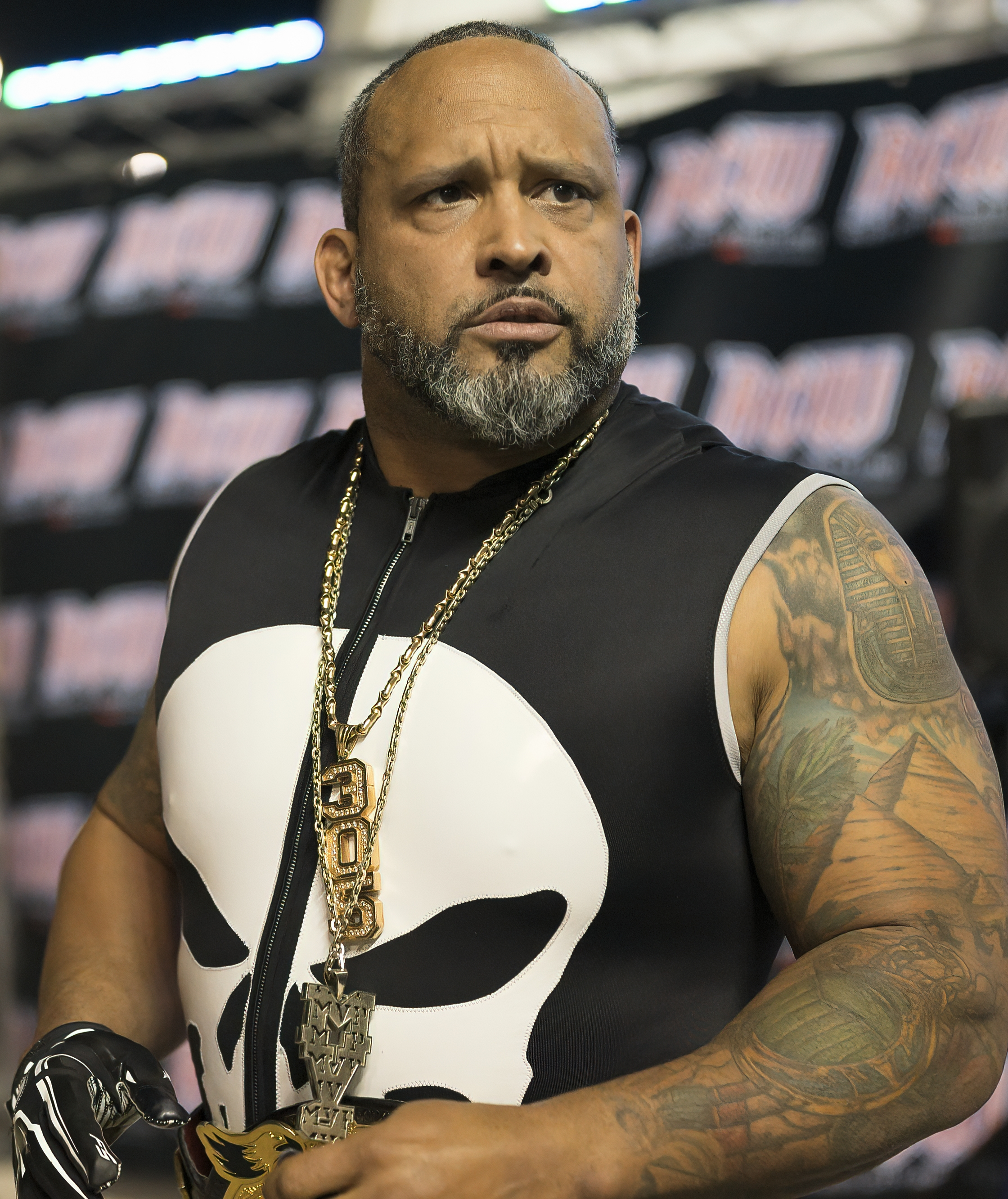
Montel Vontavious Porter

- October 1
  - Christian Borle, actor and singer
  - Devin Nunes, politician, businessman, and chief executive officer of the Trump Media & Technology Group
- October 2
  - Keiko Agena, actress
  - Melissa Harris-Perry, political commentator
  - Proof, rapper for D12 (d. 2006)
  - Efren Ramirez, actor and DJ
- October 3
  - Black Thought, rapper, singer, actor, and member of the Roots
  - Hedy Burress, actress
- October 4
  - Chris Parks, wrestler
  - Kantroy Barber, football player
- October 5 – Tom Brislin, keyboardist, singer/songwriter, producer, author, and member of Kansas
- October 8
  - Donnie Abraham, football player and coach
  - Bryan Barten, Paralympic tennis player
- October 9
  - Jennifer Aspen, actress
  - Steve Burns, actor, voice actor, director, producer, television host, guitarist, musician, and singer
  - Charles Burton, wrestler
- October 10
  - Emily M. Bender, university professor
  - P. J. Brown, soccer player
  - Mario Lopez, actor and entertainment journalist
- October 12 – Shannon Clavelle, football player
- October 13 – Matt Hughes, mixed martial artist
- October 14
  - Thom Brooks, American-born British political philosopher and legal scholar
  - Meleeka Clary, clinical psychologist, paralegal, model, actor, and director of Three Corners of Deception
  - George Floyd, murder victim (d. 2020)
- October 15
  - Antonio Armstrong, football player (d. 2016)
  - Julio Becerra Rivero, Cuban-born chess grandmaster
  - Dax Riggs, musician
- October 16
  - Justin Credible, wrestler
  - Brian Schottenheimer, football coach
- October 17 – David Cox, basketball player and coach
- October 18
  - John Baldwin, Olympic figure skater
  - Craig Billmeier, punk musician
  - Neal Brennan, comedian, writer, producer, director, and podcaster
  - Rachel Nichols, sports journalist
- October 19 – Corporal Punishment, wrestler
- October 20
  - William Birdthistle, Irish-born university professor
  - Jimena Canales, science history and author
- October 21
  - Lera Auerbach, Russian-born Austrian-American composer and pianist
  - Alvin Bragg, lawyer and politician
  - Bryan Corey, baseball player
- October 22
  - Kris Cox, golfer
  - Brandon Paulson, wrestler
- October 23
  - Vivian Bang, South Korean-born actress
  - Mac Cozier, soccer player
- October 24
  - Kurt Kuenne, filmmaker
  - Korie Robertson, television personality
- October 25
  - Lamont Bentley, actor and rapper (d. 2005)
  - John Blewett III, stock car racing driver (d. 2007)
  - Michael Weston, actor
- October 26
  - Rorke Denver, Navy SEAL and actor
  - Seth MacFarlane, actor, screenwriter, producer, director, and singer
- October 27
  - Michi Atkins, basketball player
  - Harold Cronk, writer, director, and producer
  - Lori Trahan, politician
- October 28
  - Clad Clark, tennis player
  - Montel Vontavious Porter, wrestler
- October 30 – Dave Asprey, entrepreneur and author
- October 31
  - Kate Aldrich, opera singer
  - Sandra Arana, American-born Peruvian actress, model, and television presenter
  - Tim Byrdak, baseball player
  - Roger Lima, bassist and vocalist for Less than Jake
  - Beverly Lynne, actress

=== November ===
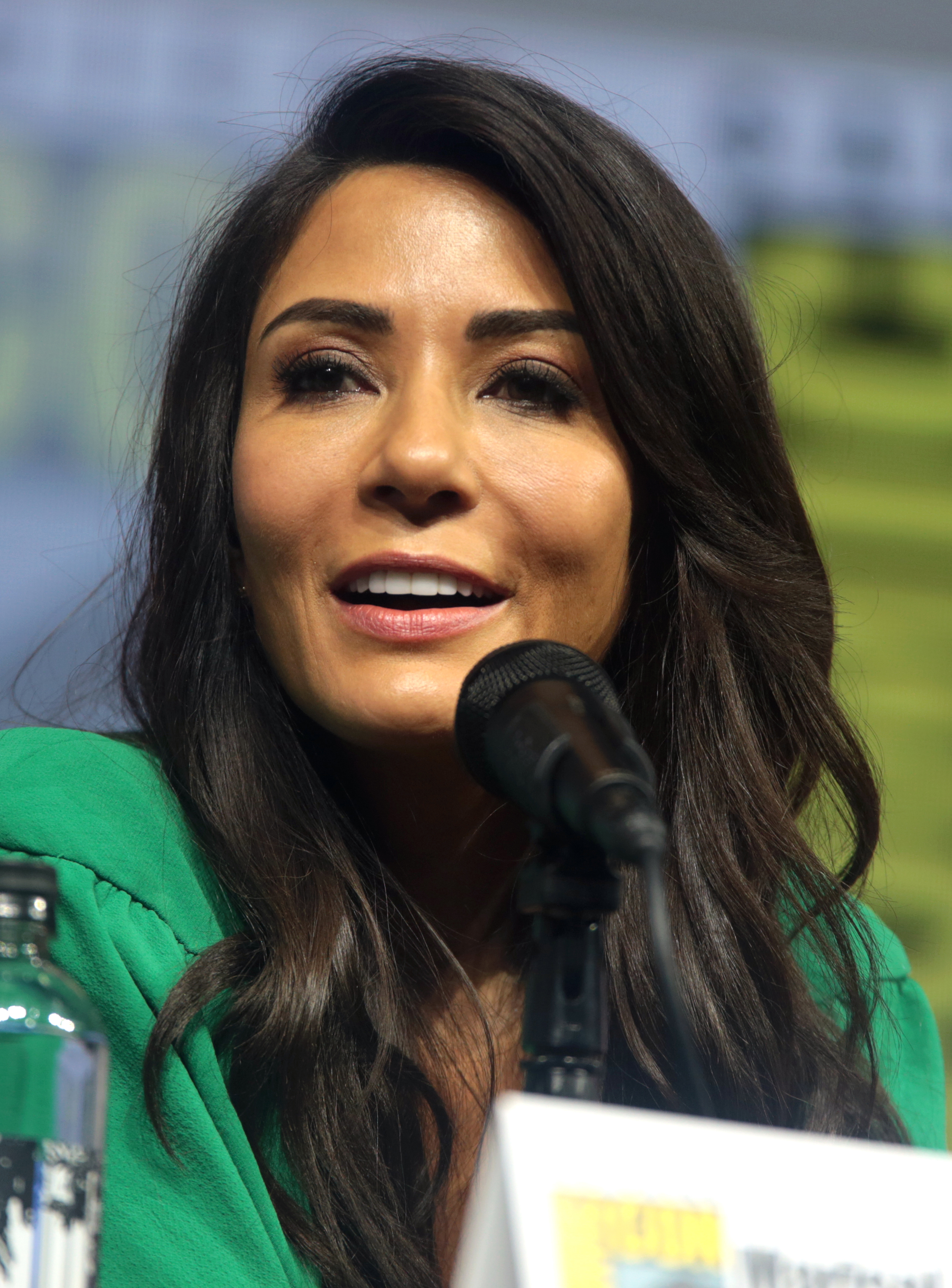
Marisol Nichols

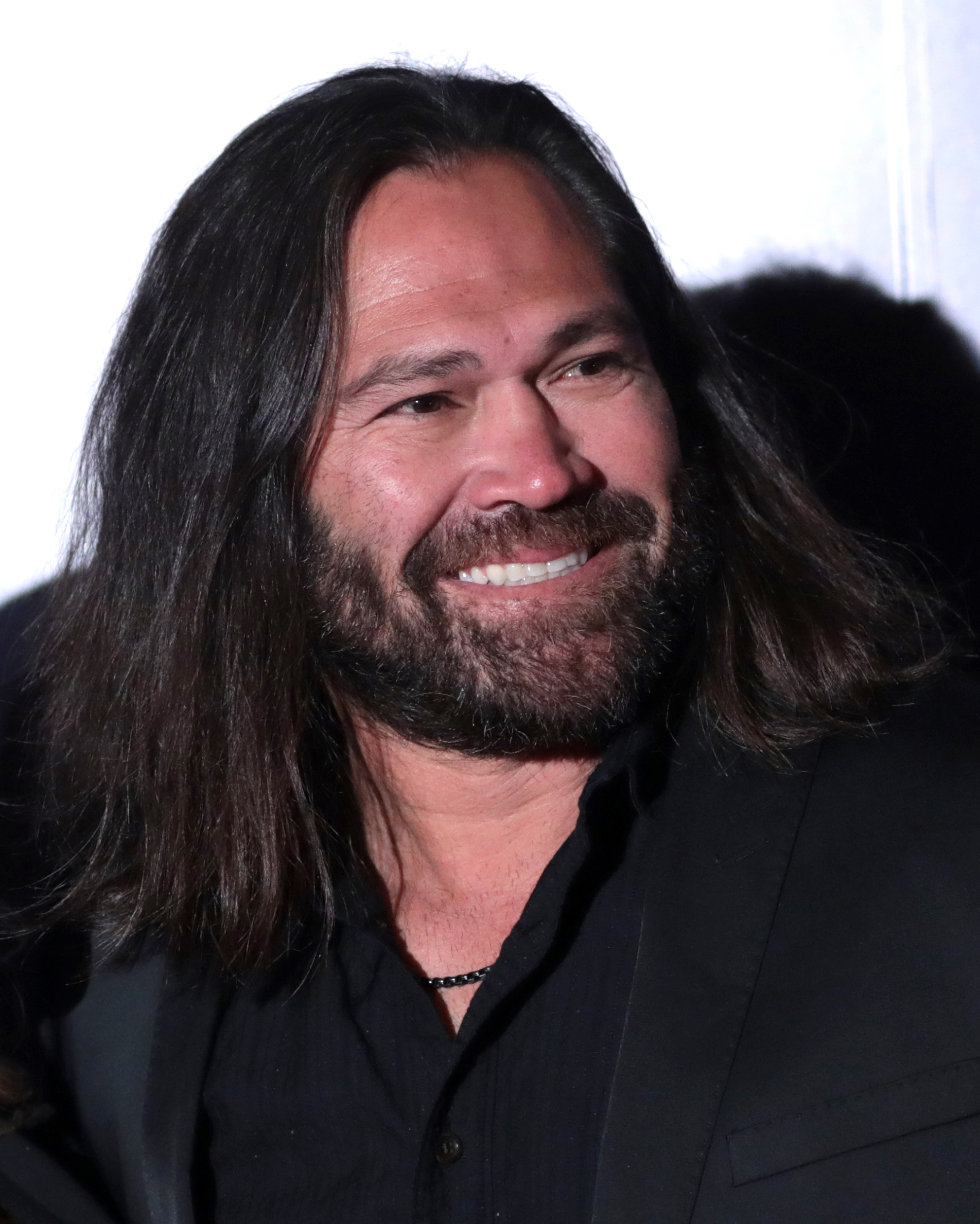
Johnny Damon

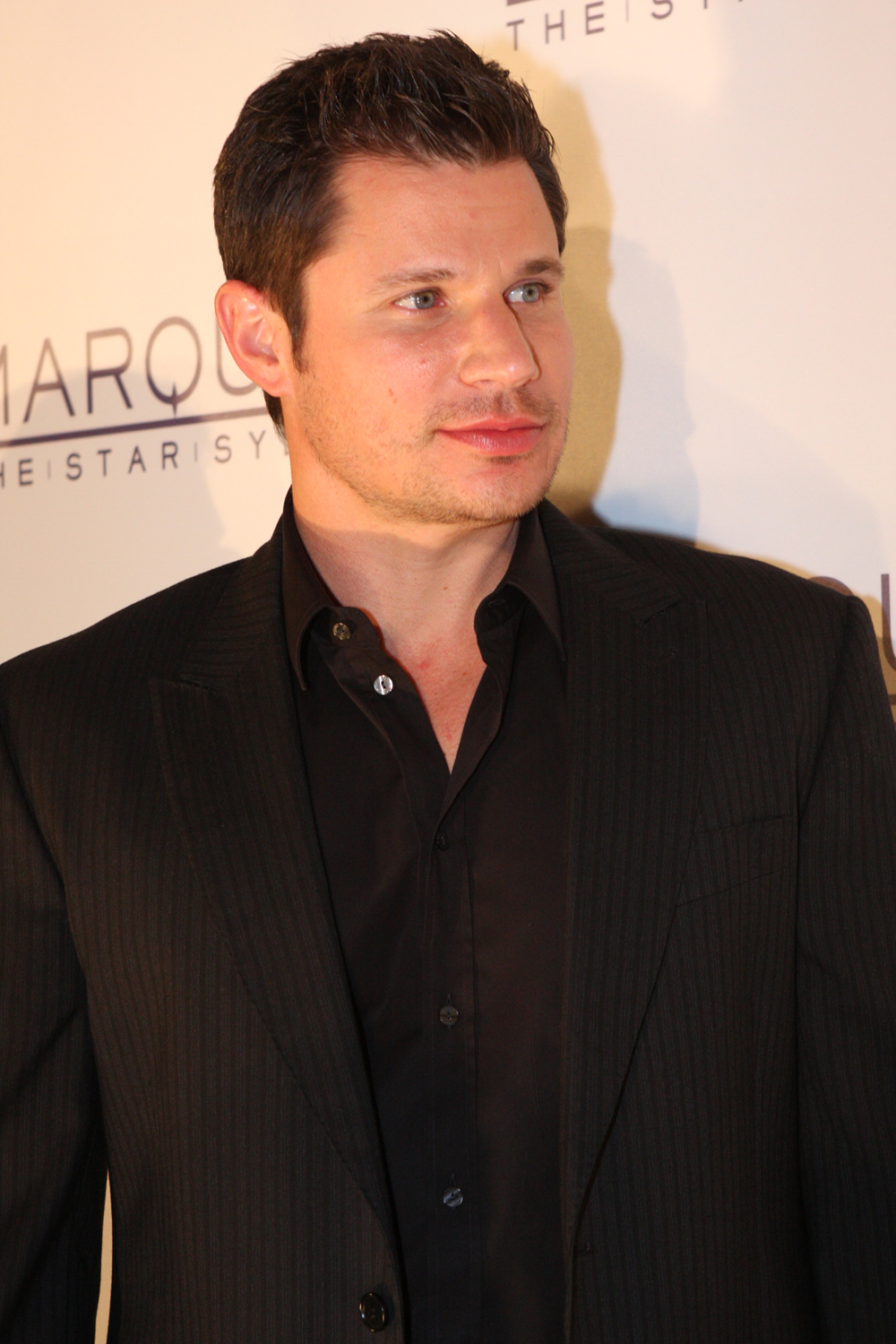
Nick Lachey

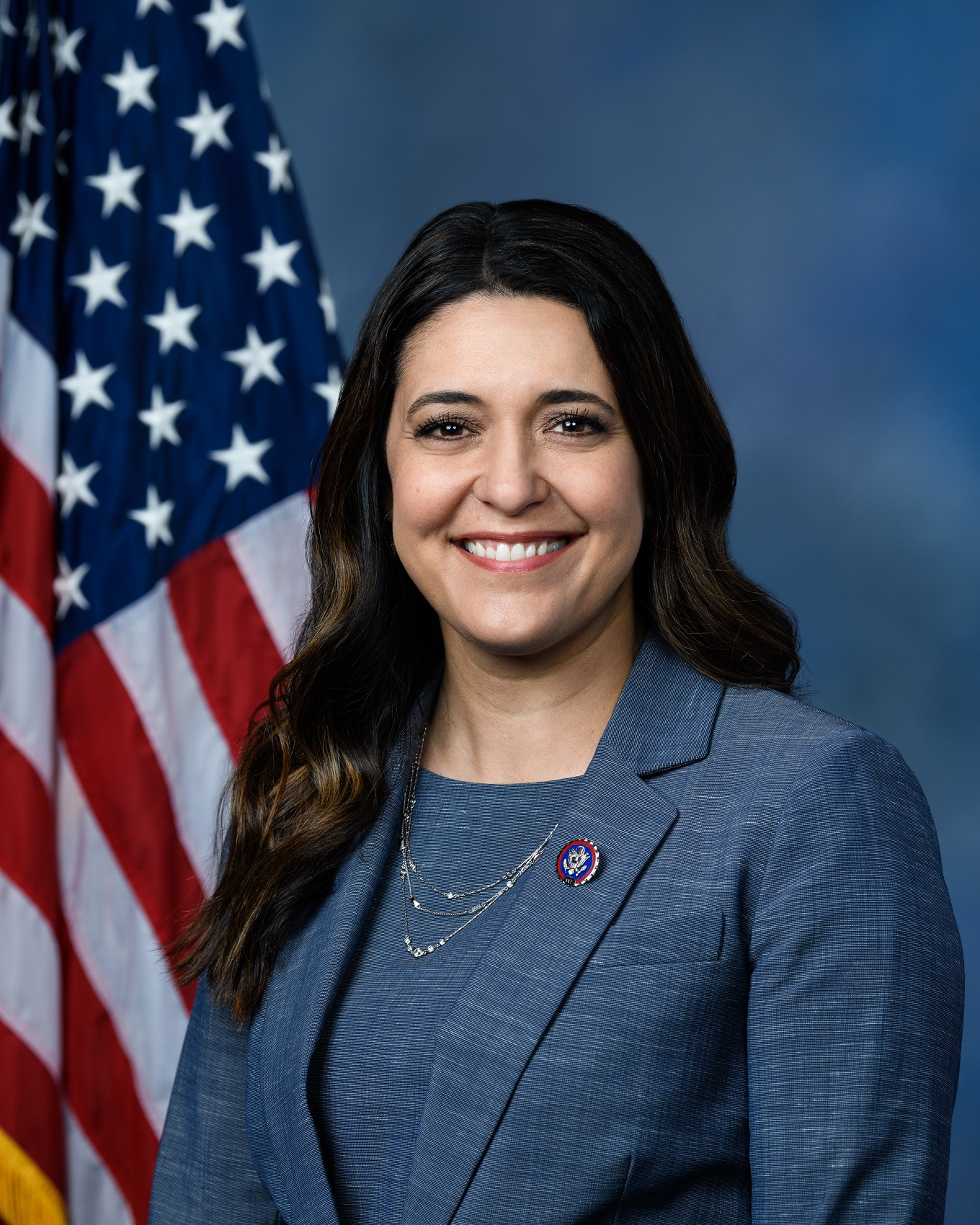
Stephanie Bice

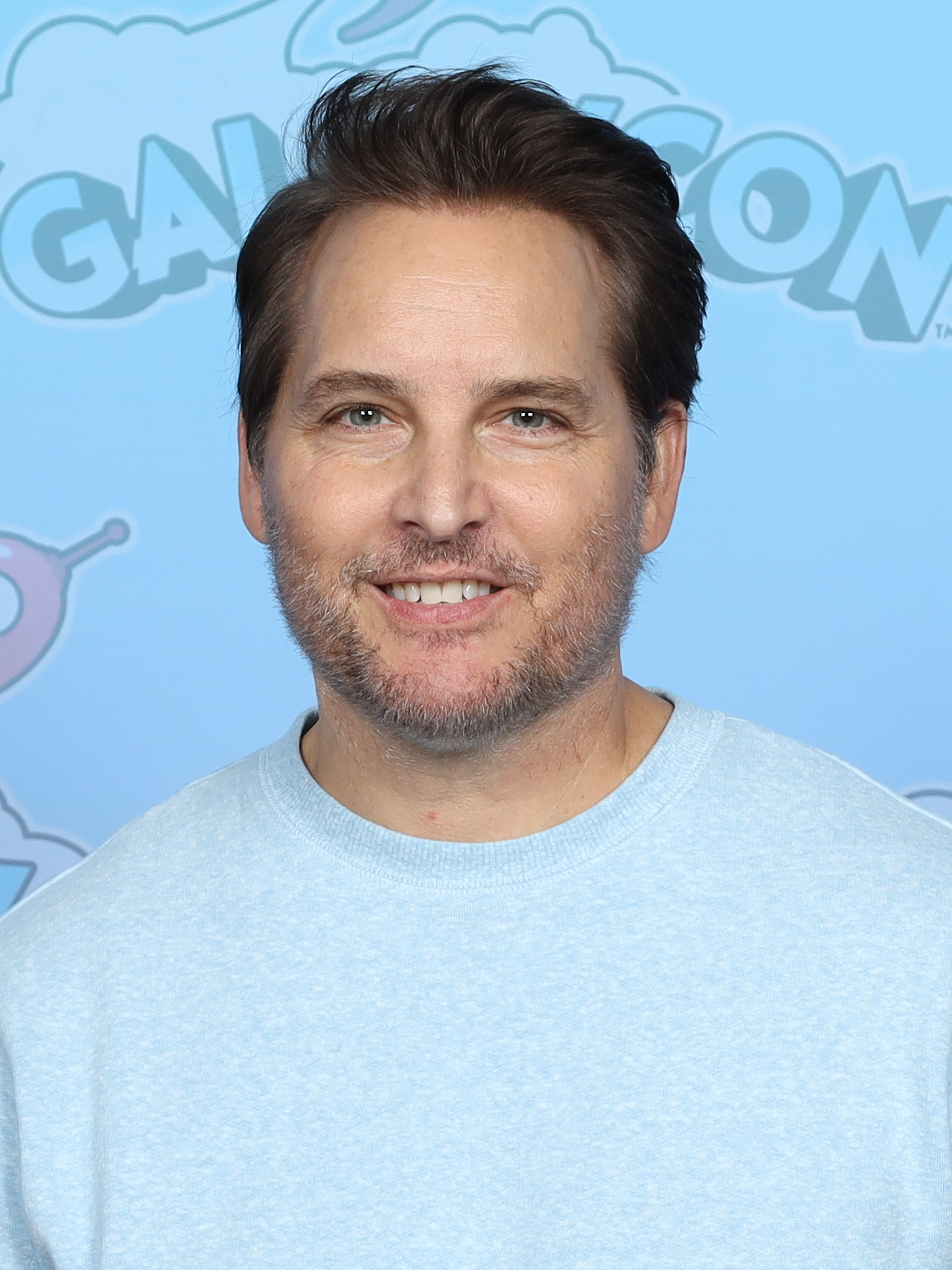
Peter Facinelli

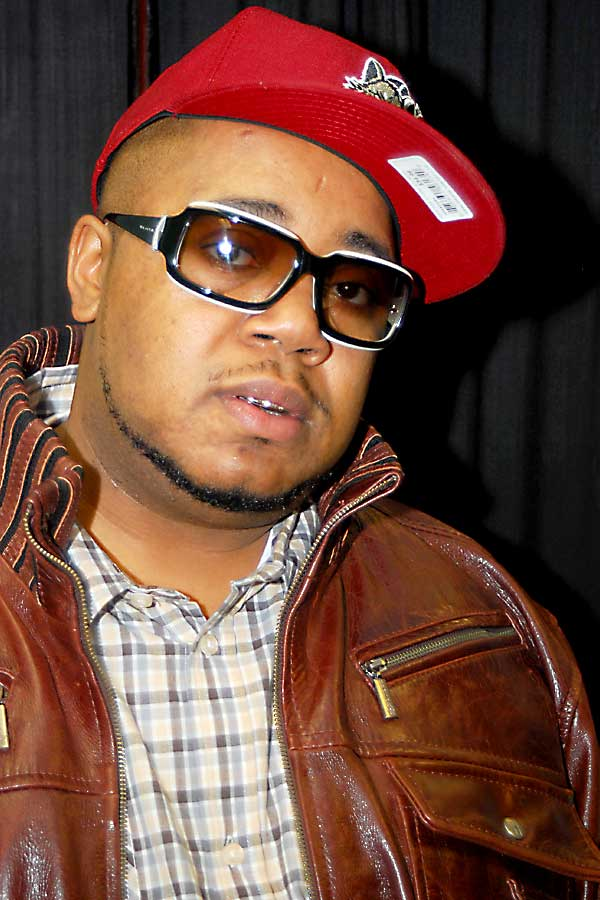
Twista

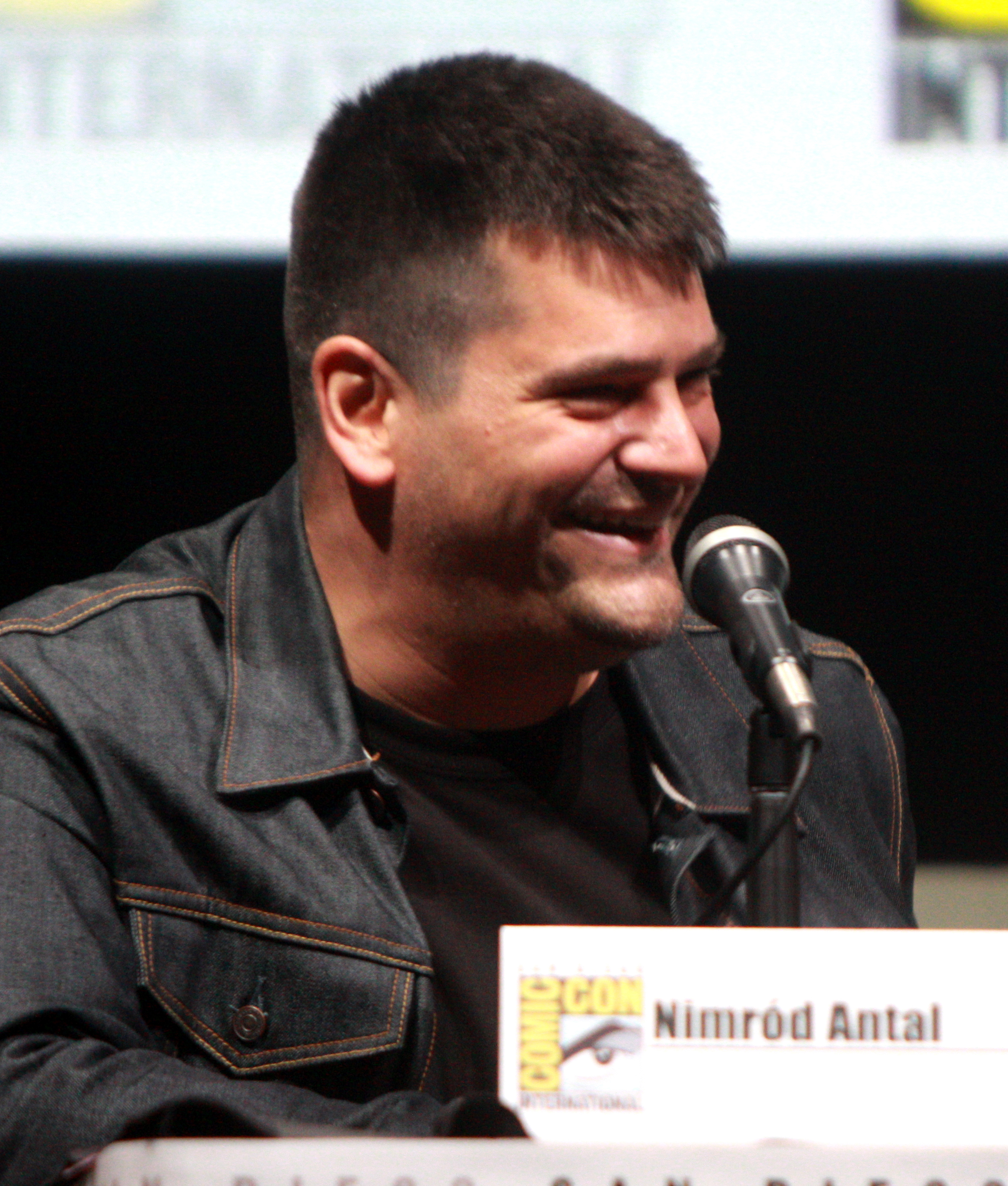
Nimród Antal

- November 1
  - David Berman, actor and researcher
  - Dawn Burrell, Olympic long jumper and chef
- November 2
  - John Donley Adams, lawyer and politician
  - Marisol Nichols, actress
- November 3
  - Kahlil Ashanti, actor and writer
  - Kirk Jones, rapper for Onyx
  - Mick Thomson, guitarist
- November 4 – Eric Bennett, Paralympic archer
- November 5
  - James Collins, basketball player
  - Johnny Damon, baseball player
  - Peter Emmerich, illustrator
- November 6
  - Taje Allen, football player
  - Garrett Caldwell, American-born Canadian soccer player
  - Jim Chern, Catholic priest in the Archdiocese of Newark
  - Carla Cotwright-Williams, mathematician
- November 7
  - Seven Antonopoulos, drummer
  - Yunjin Kim, South Korean-born actress
- November 8
  - Dante Calabria, basketball player
  - Christopher R. Cooke, Catholic prelate and auxiliary bishop for the Archdiocese of Philadelphia
  - David Muir, journalist and news anchor
- November 9
  - Duane Butler, football player
  - Nick Lachey, actor, singer, television personality, host, and member of 98 Degrees
- November 10 – Creature, rapper
- November 11 – Stephanie Bice, politician
- November 12
  - Jill Barry, politician
  - Kerry Blackshear Sr., basketball player
- November 13
  - Lynsey Addario, photojournalist
  - Derrick Alexander, football player
  - Jordan Bridges, actor
  - Lorig Charkoudian, restauranteur and entrepreneur
- November 14
  - Daniel Ahlers, businessman and politician
  - Kareem Campbell, skateboarder
  - Matt Cedeño, actor and model
  - Lawyer Milloy, football player
- November 16 – Marcus Lemonis, Lebanese-born businessman, investor, and television personality
- November 17
  - Simone Edwards, Jamaican-born basketball player (d. 2023)
  - Lord Infamous, rapper for Three 6 Mafia (d. 2013)
- November 19
  - Cindy Abrams, politician
  - Yoram Bauman, economist and comedian
  - Billy Currington, country singer/songwriter
  - Django Haskins, singer/songwriter and guitarist
- November 20
  - Sav Rocca, Australian-born football player
  - Becca Swanson, powerlifter and strongwoman
- November 21 – Luke Aikins, skydiver, BASE jumper, pilot, and aerial photographer
- November 22 – Jamie Belsito, politician
- November 23
  - John Eric Armstrong, convicted serial killer
  - Autumn Burke, politician
- November 24
  - Bret Bergmark, mixed martial artist
  - Donny Brady, football player
  - J. C. Chandor, filmmaker
  - Amy Faye Hayes, ring announcer and model
- November 25 – Eddie Steeples, actor
- November 26 – Peter Facinelli, actor
- November 27
  - Jason Beverlin, baseball player and coach
  - Jon Runyan, politician
  - Twista, rapper
- November 28
  - Brian Bonin, ice hockey player
  - Ed Broxterman, Olympic high jumper
  - Gina Tognoni, actress
- November 30
  - Nimród Antal, Hungarian-born director, screenwriter, and actor
  - Sharon Brous, rabbi

=== December ===
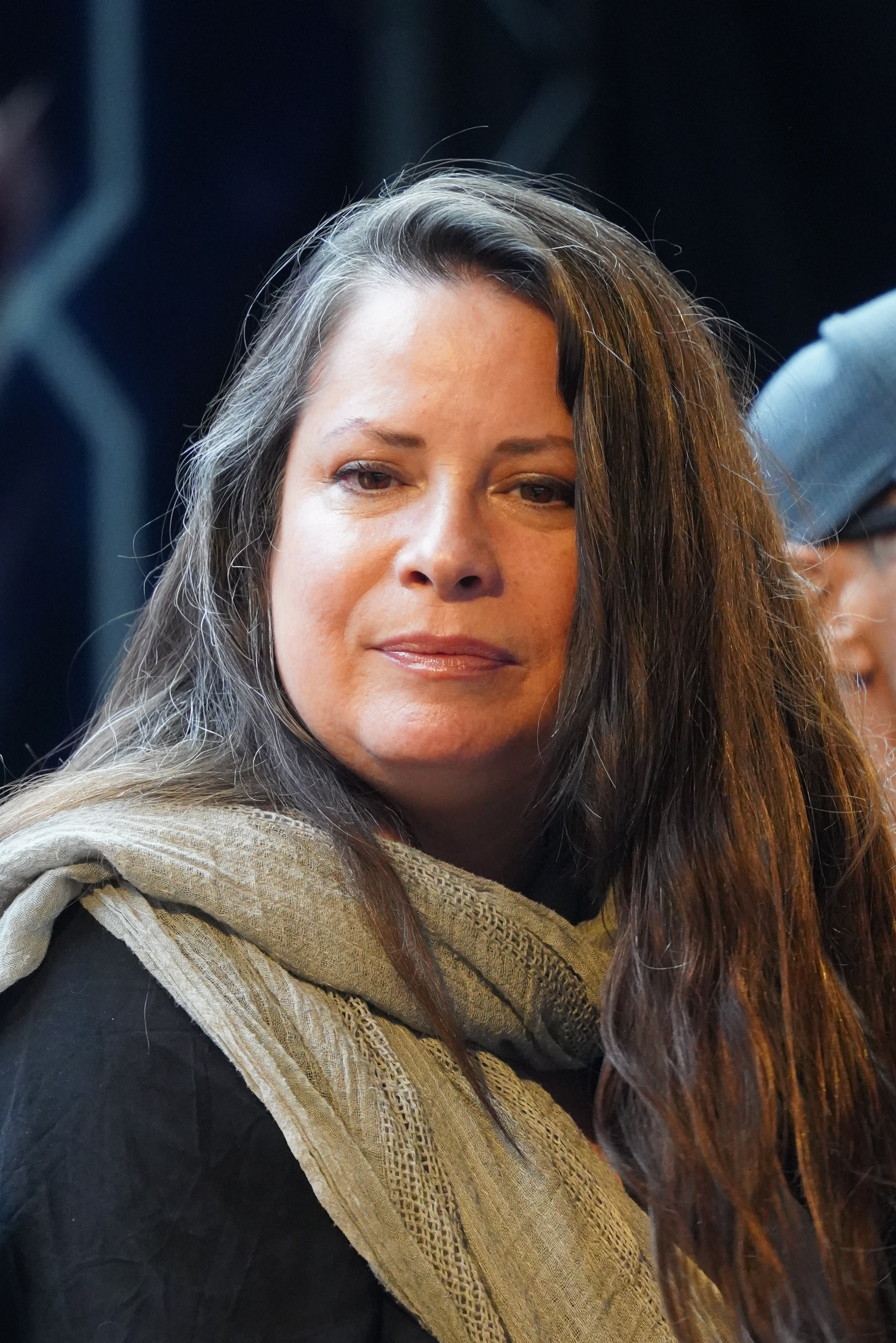
Holly Marie Combs

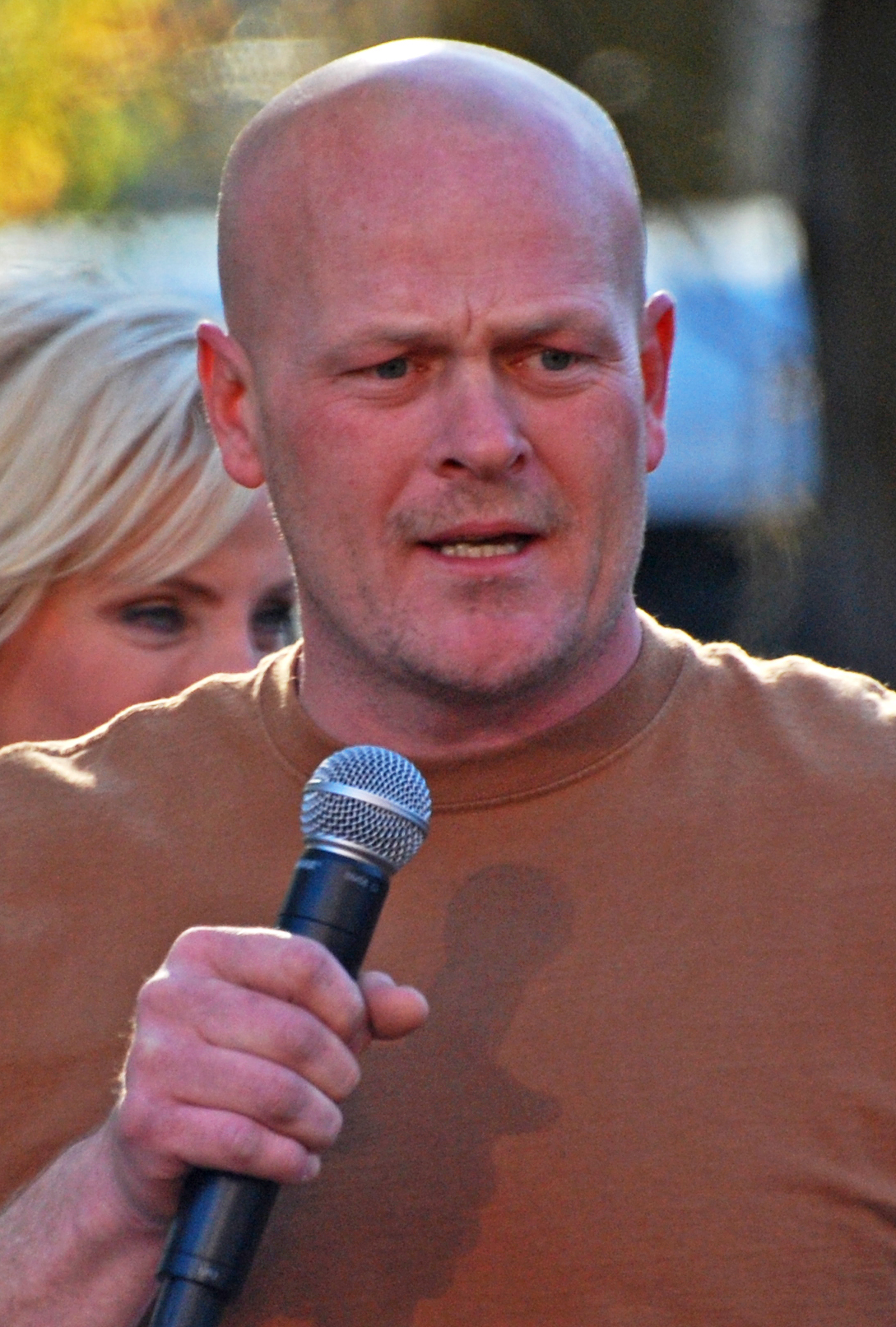
Joe the Plumber

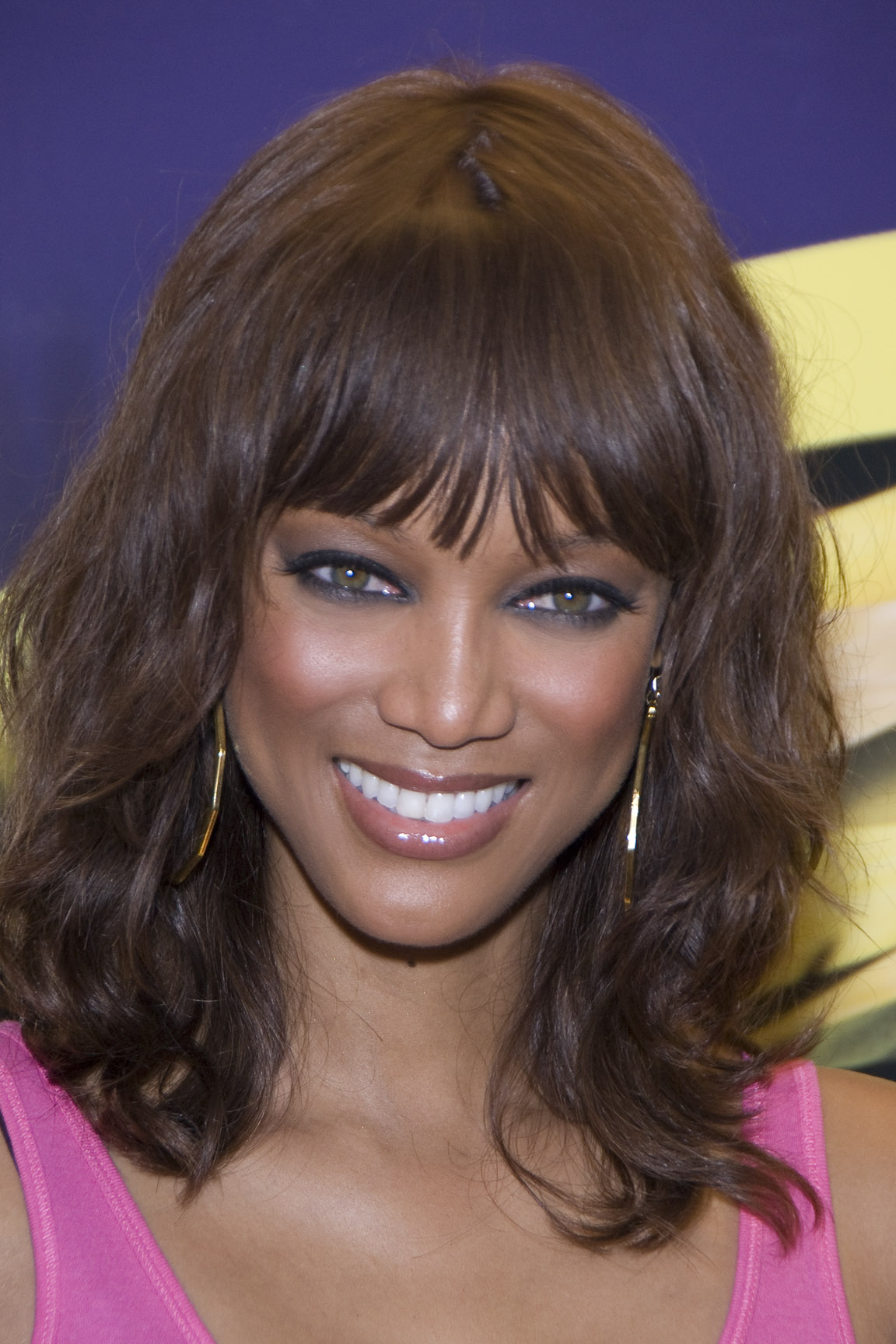
Tyra Banks

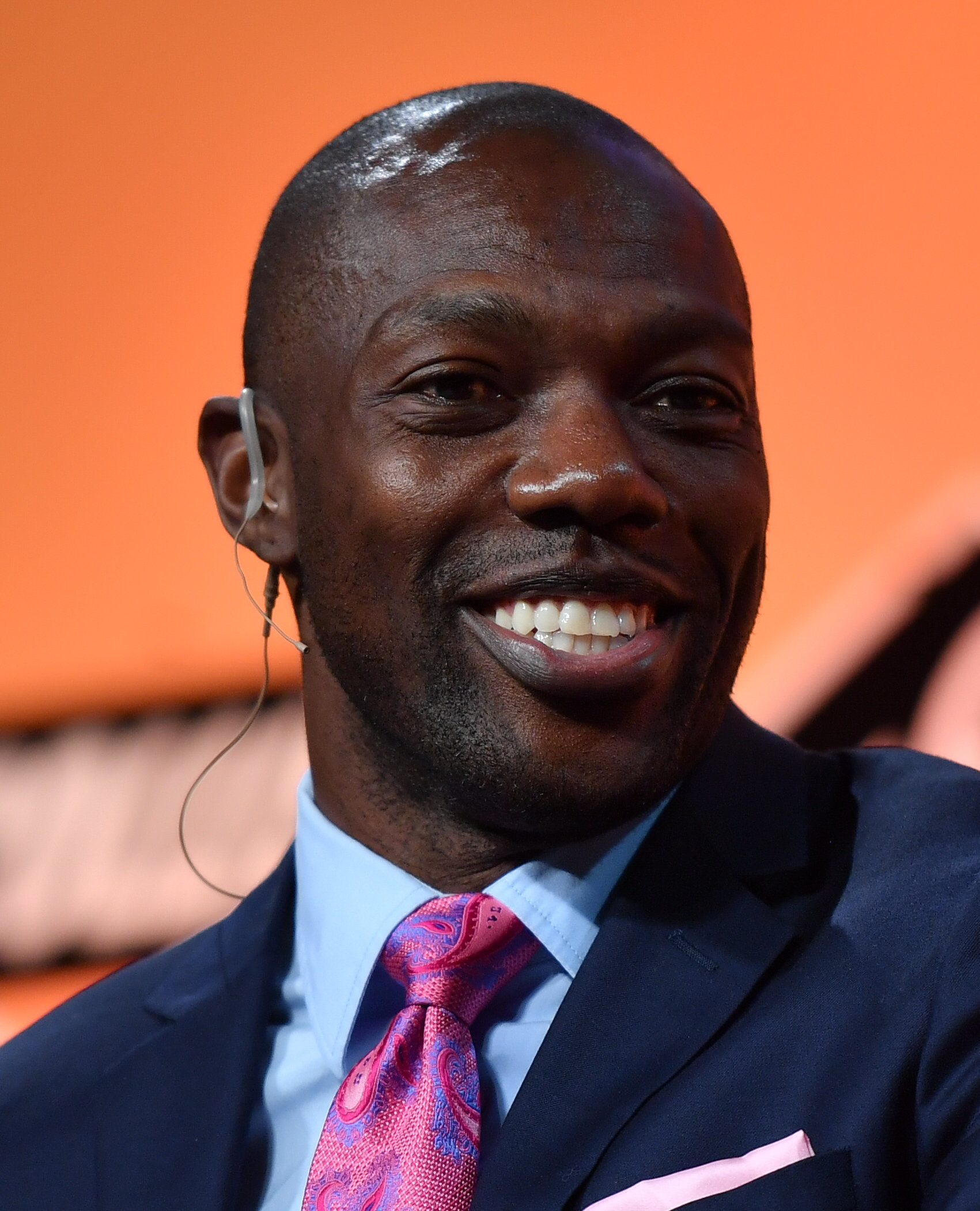
Terrell Owens

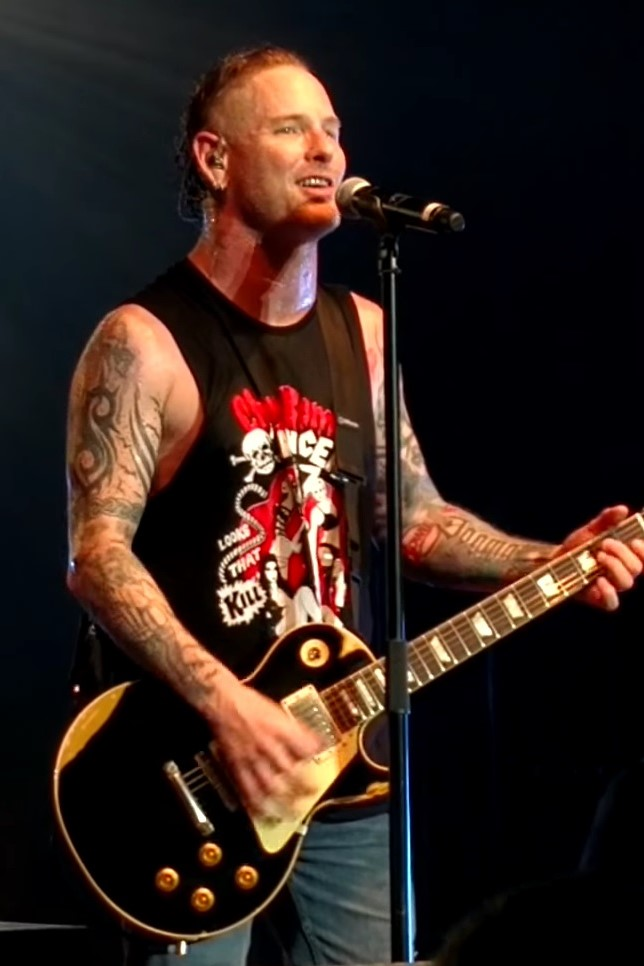
Corey Taylor

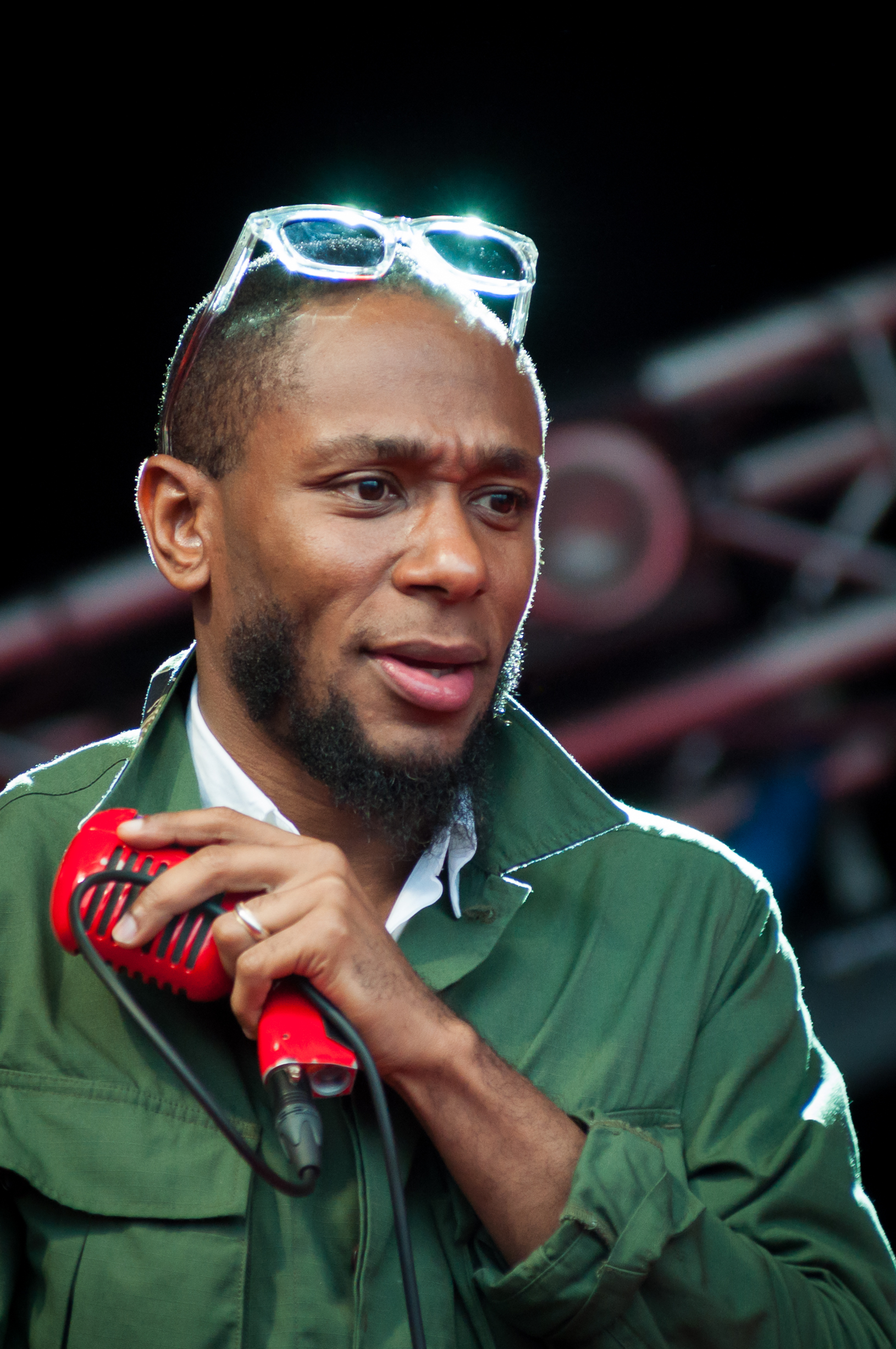
Yasiin Bey

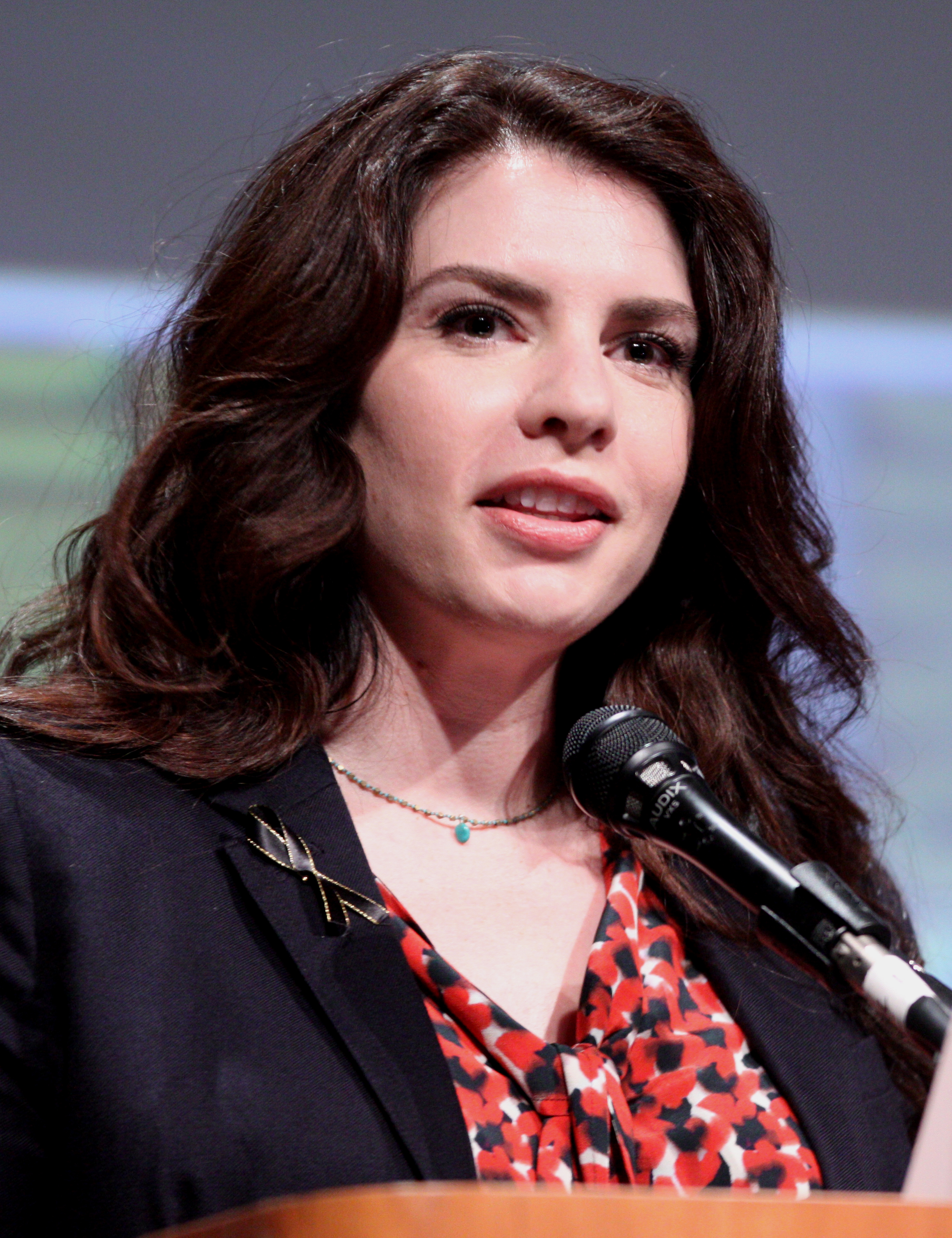
Stephenie Meyer

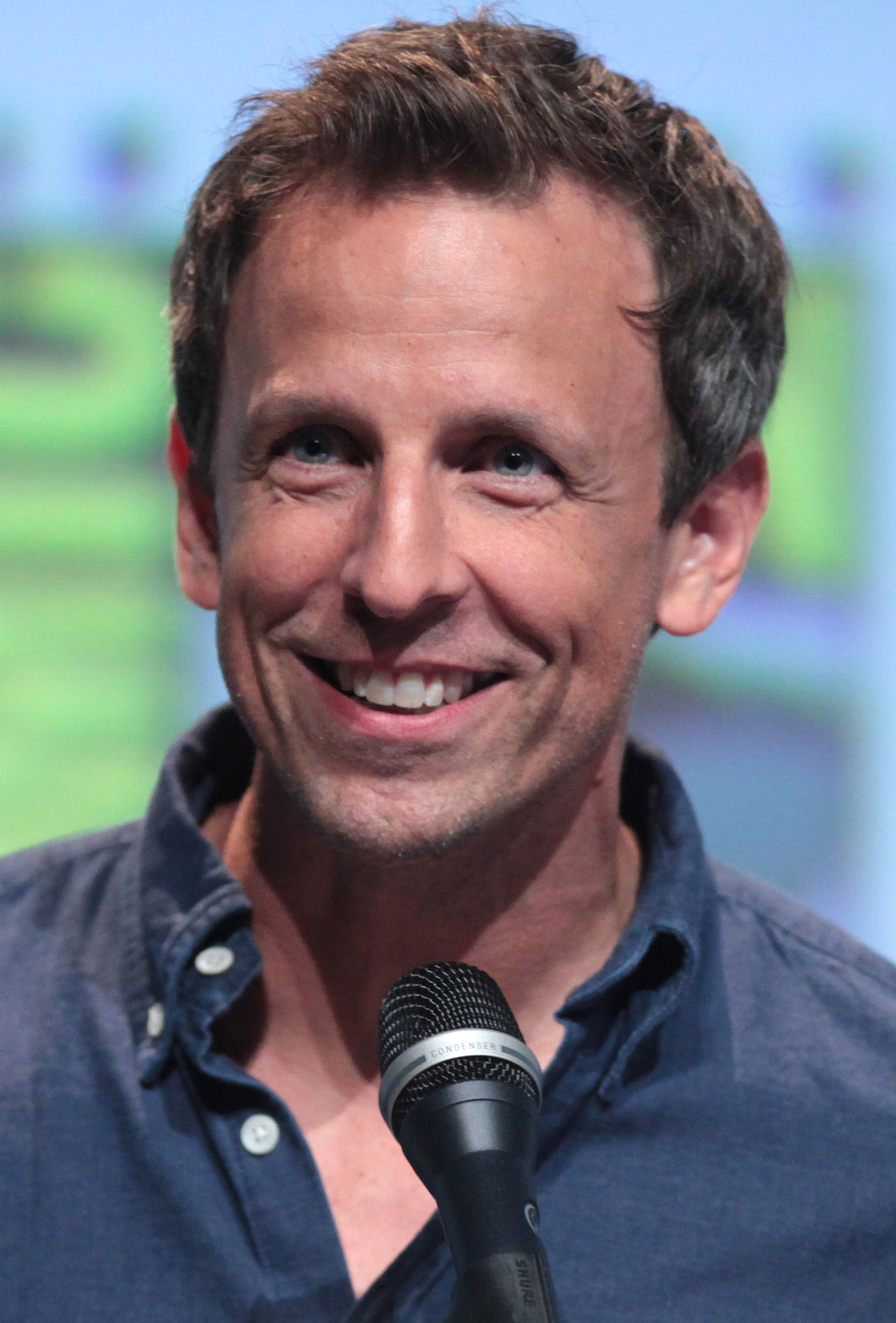
Seth Meyers

- December 1 – Lombardo Boyar, comedian, actor, and voice artist
- December 2
  - LaVerne Clark, mixed martial artist and boxer
  - Lamart Cooper, football player
  - Erik Courtney, filmmaker
- December 3
  - Holly Marie Combs, actress
  - Shayne Culpepper, Olympic runner
  - Joe the Plumber, conservative activist and commentator (d. 2023)
- December 4
  - Tyra Banks, supermodel, actress, and talk show host
  - Keith Caputo, singer and frontman for Life of Agony
- December 5
  - Rod Barry, pornographic actor
  - Brad Carter, actor, guitarist, painter, sculptor, and photographer
- December 7
  - Kelly Barnhill, author
  - Carrie Kei Heim, actress, lawyer and writer
  - Terrell Owens, football player
  - Wolfie D, wrestler
- December 8
  - Gina Hinojosa, politician
  - Corey Taylor, singer and frontman for Slipknot and Stone Sour
- December 9
  - Stacey Abrams, politician and voting rights activist
  - Tony Batista, Dominican-born baseball player
- December 10
  - Nic Belasco, basketball player
  - Jeff Blashill, ice hockey player and coach
  - Mike Crum, skateboarder
  - Arden Myrin, comedian
- December 11
  - Butch Cassidy, singer
  - Yasiin Bey, rapper and actor
- December 12
  - Pamela L. Gay, astronomer
  - Tony Hsieh, Internet entrepreneur (d. 2020)
  - Paz Lenchantin, Argentine-born musician
  - Denise Parker, archer
- December 13
  - Chris Ballard, sports journalist
  - Christopher Bielawski, university professor
  - Matt Bronleewe, record producer, musician, novelist, and songwriter
  - Christie Clark, actress
- December 14
  - John Cardiel, skateboarder and snowboarder
  - Thuy Trang, Vietnamese-born actress (d. 2001)
- December 15
  - Christopher R. Barron, political activist and co-found of GOProud
  - Terrell Bell, basketball player
  - Joel Chasnoff, American-born Israeli comedian
  - Mike Cherry, football player
  - Jason Upton, Christian singer/songwriter
- December 16
  - Melvin Cunningham, football player
  - Scott Storch, hip-hop producer
- December 17 – Brian Fitzpatrick, politician
- December 18
  - Leila Arcieri, actress, model, and businesswoman
  - Caesar Bacarella, stock car racing driver
  - King Louie Bankston, musician (d. 2022)
  - Justin Bennett, musician and producer
  - Brad Cohen, motivational speaker, teacher, school administrator, and author
- December 19
  - Danny Cage, wrestler
  - Casual, rapper
- December 20 – Jenny Boucek, basketball player and coach
- December 21
  - Mike Alstott, football player
  - Donnell Baker, football player (d. 2020)
- December 22 – Octaviano Juarez-Corro, Mexican-born convicted murderer (d. 2023)
- December 24
  - Chris Ash, football coach
  - James Cromwell, judge
  - Stephenie Meyer, writer and producer
- December 25
  - Tarrik Brock, baseball player and coach
  - Chris Harris, wrestler
- December 26
  - Ryan Berube, Olympic swimmer
  - Katherine Creag, Filipino-born journalist (d. 2021)
  - Reichen Lehmkuhl, lawyer, businessman, television personality, model, and Air Force Captain
- December 27
  - Art Atwood, bodybuilder (d. 2011)
  - Dean Bernardini, bassist for Chevelle (2005–2019)
  - William Clay, Olympic cyclist
  - Wilson Cruz, actor
- December 28
  - Seth Meyers, comedian, writer, producer, actor, and television host
  - Scott Campbell, artist and production designer
- December 29
  - Dionciel Armstrong, writer, director, and producer
  - Theo Epstein, baseball general manager
  - Pimp C, rap artist (d. 2007)
- December 30 – Jason Behr, actor
- December 31 – Shandon Anderson, basketball player

=== Full date unknown ===
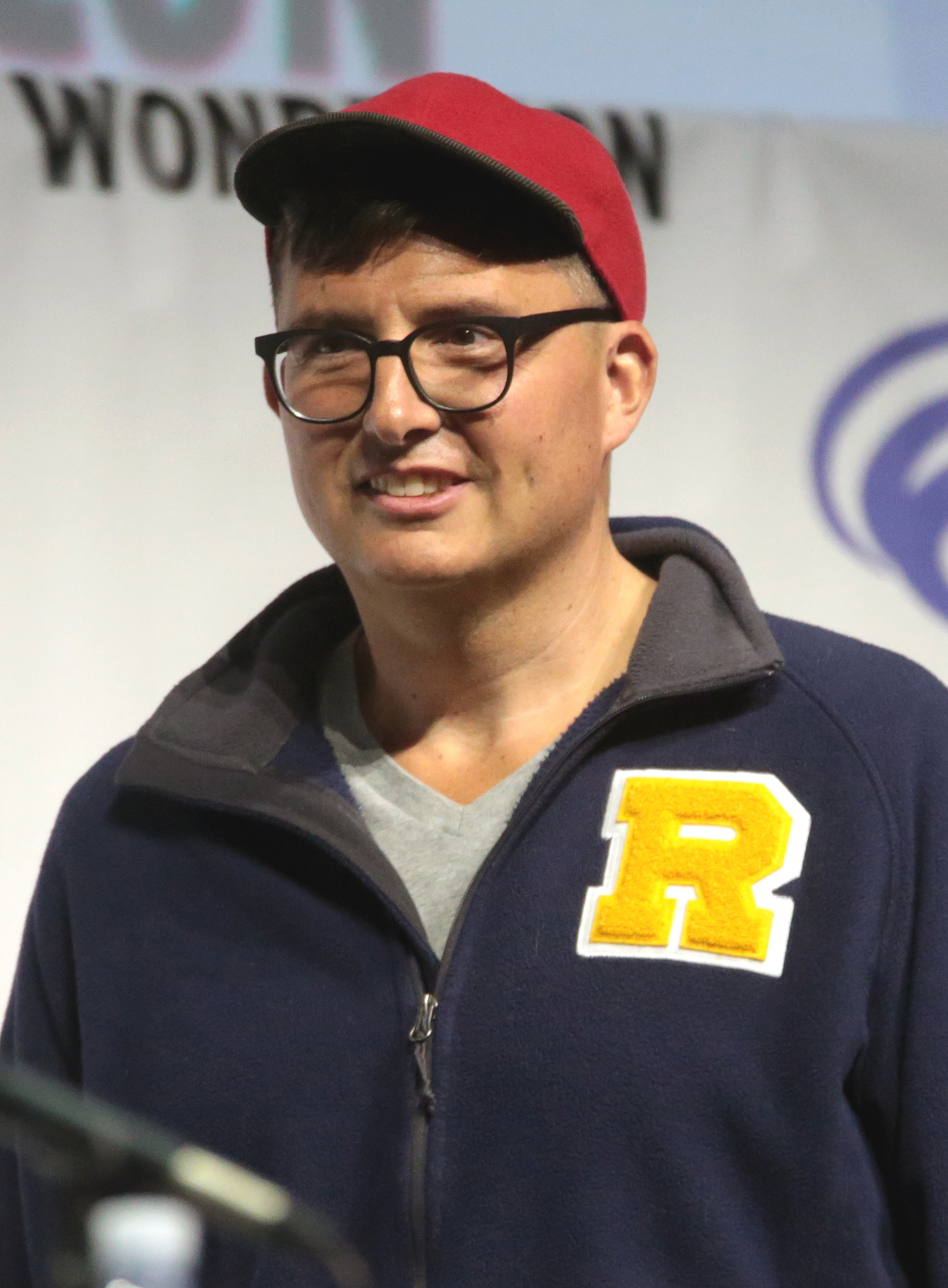
Roberto Aguirre-Sacasa

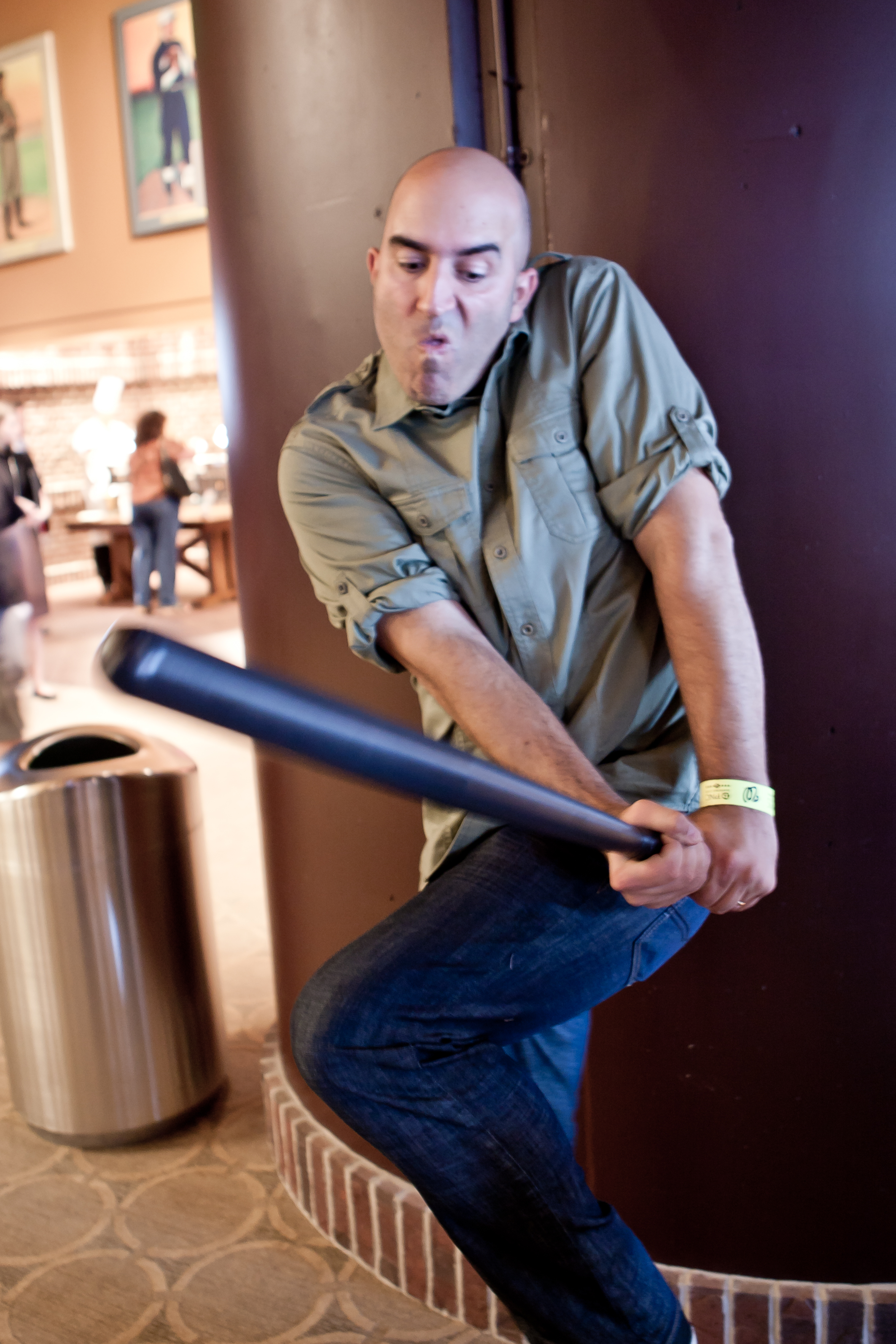
Batting Stance Guy

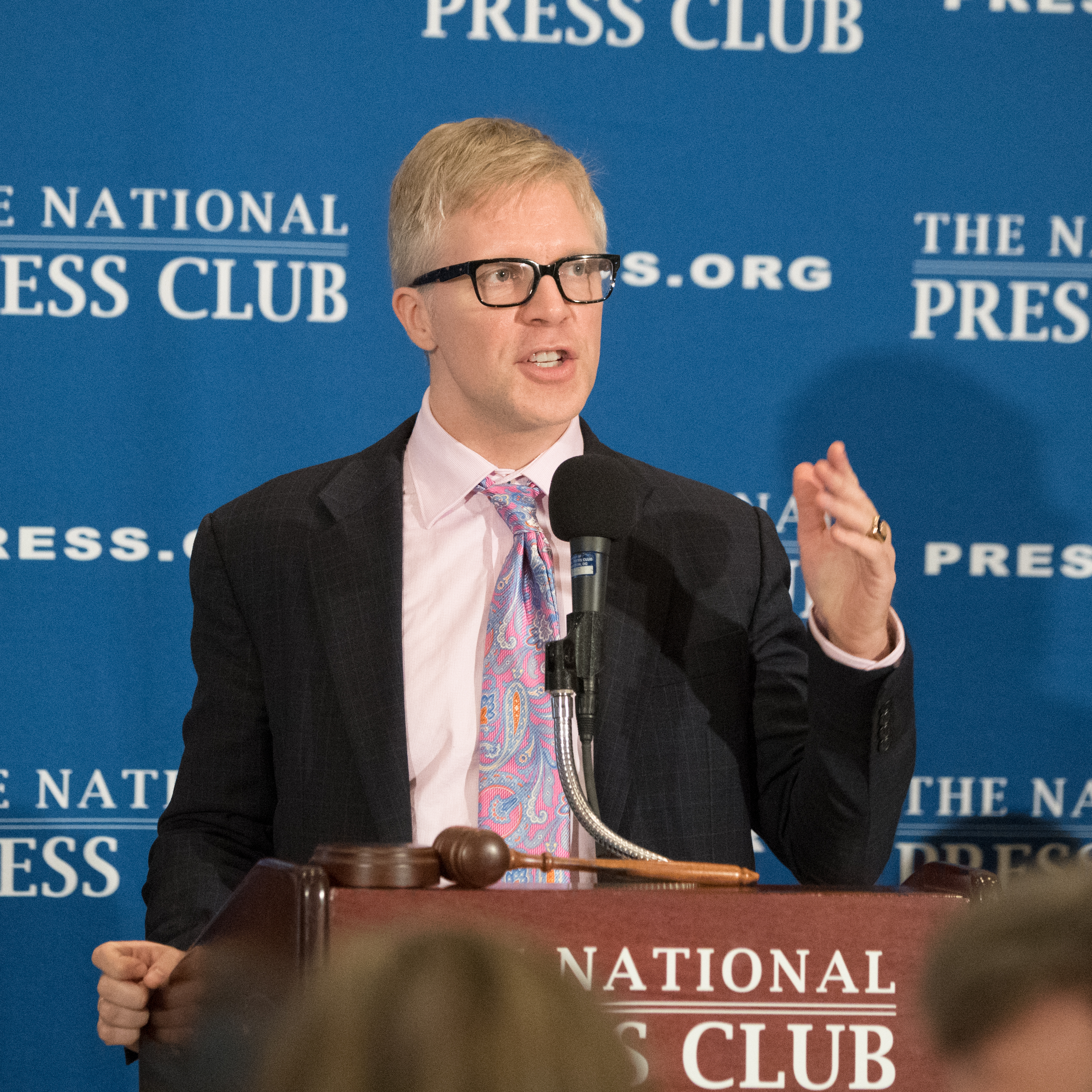
Alan Bjerga

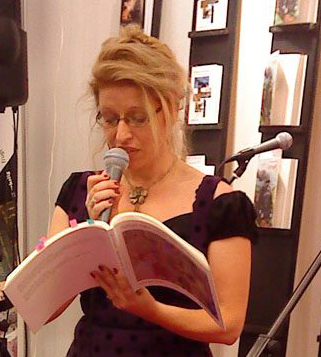
Cindy Lynn Brown

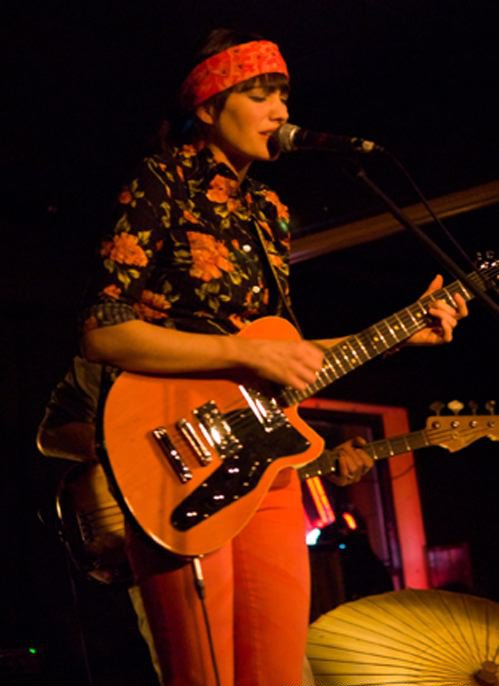
Pieta Brown

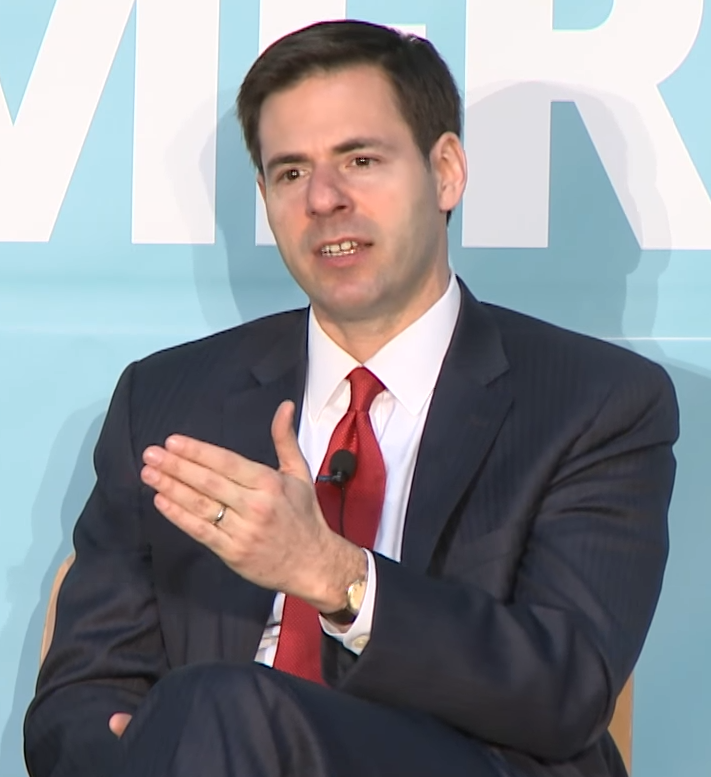
John P. Carlin

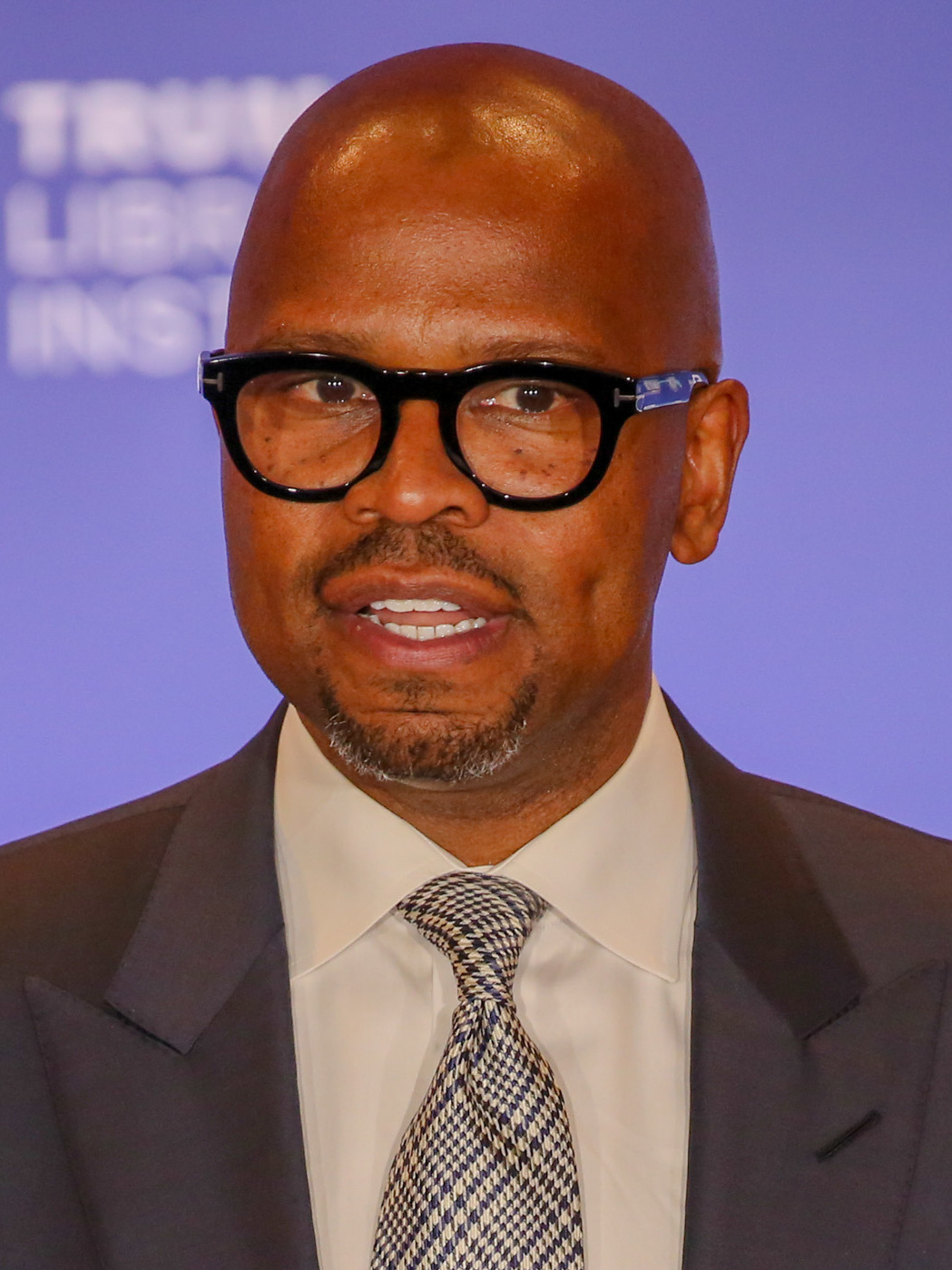
Theodore Colbert III

- John M. Ackerman, American-born Mexican political activist, TV host, and academic
- Nick Adams, writer and author
- Titilayo Adedokun, singer and beauty queen
- Jeremy Adelman, composer
- Brad Adkins, artist and curator
- Luis Gabriel Aguilera, American-born Mexican author, writer, musician, language teacher, and social justice activist
- Roberto Aguirre-Sacasa, playwright, screenwriter, and comic book writer
- Gema Alava, Spanish-born artist
- Saleem Ali, American-born Australian scientist
- Jessica Andersen, writer
- Eric Chase Anderson, author, illustrator, and actor
- Miya Ando, artist
- Saman Arbabi, Iranian-born journalist
- Mark Archer, producer, director, and writer
- Ana Claudia Arias, Brazilian-born physicist
- Vernice Armour, Marine Captain and naval aviator
- Kristen Ashburn, photojournalist
- Maximilian Auffhammer, environmental economist
- Pejman Azarmina, Iranian-born scholar, entrepreneur, musician, and thinkocrat
- Stephen Babcock, lawyer
- Vadim Backman, biomedical engineer
- Khaldoun Baghdadi, Jordanian-born politician
- Eric Baker, businessman and founder of Viagogo
- Cheryl E. Ball, academic and scholar
- Todd Ballard, Christian musician and worship leader
- Hayley Barker, painter
- John Barros, businessman and politician
- Batting Stance Guy, YouTuber
- Éric Baudelaire, artist and filmmaker
- Avantika Bawa, Indian-born artist, curator, and professor
- Ross Beach, musician, songwriter, and record producer
- Dan Beachy-Quick, poet, writer, and critic
- Prakash Belkale, Indian-born mathematician
- Brian Belott, artist and performer
- Fadil Berisha, Albanian-born photographer
- Mischa Berlinski, author
- Laura Berman, Spanish-born artist and printmaker
- Laura Bialis, American-born Israeli filmmaker
- Sandra Biedron, physicist
- Shannon Bilbray-Axelrod, politician
- Alan Bjerga, author and journalist
- Brian Blanchfield, poet and essayist
- Adam Block, astrophotographer
- Brett Ellen Block, novelist
- Rob Bochnik, musician, audio engineer, and singer/songwriter
- Kirsten Bomblies, biological researcher
- J Boogie, DJ, music producer, radio host, music director and curator
- Scott Boothby, hammer thrower
- Dražen Bošnjak, Bosnian-born composer and sound designer
- Anne Boyer, poet and essayist
- Alan Braverman, businessman, co-founder of Xoom Corporation and Eventbrite
- Jesse Bravo, psychic and banker
- Mat Brinkman, artist and electronic musician
- David Bronner, corporate executive and activist
- Andrea Brown, opera soprano
- Cindy Lynn Brown, Danish-born poet
- Eleanor Brown, novelist, anthologist, editor, teacher, and speaker
- Nadia Brown, poet, writer, and author
- Pieta Brown, artist, musician, producer, multi-instrumentalist, and singer/songwriter
- Tyrone Brown, convicted felon
- Simone Browne, author and educator
- Sharon R. Browning, geneticist
- Nathan Bryan, biologist and researcher
- Stefan G. Bucher, German-born writer, graphic designer, and illustrator
- Judy Budnitz, writer
- Jason Buhrmester, journalist and author
- Jim Burke, illustrator
- Mike Burns, filmmaker
- Tim Burns, politician
- Bisa Butler, fiber artist
- Ben Caldwell, cartoonist
- Jean-Pierre Canlis, glass artist
- Julie Cantrell, author
- Jonathan Caouette, director, writer, editor and actor
- John P. Carlin, attorney, U.S. Assistant Attorney General for the National Security Division (2014–2016), and United States Deputy Attorney General (2021)
- Martin Causer, politician
- Zoë Charlton, artist and University professor
- Imran Chaudhri, British-born product designer
- Mei-Ann Chen, Taiwanese-born conductor
- Yarrow Cheney, director, artist, designer, author, illustrator, and animator
- Nick Cho, barista, businessman, and internet personality
- Doo-Ri Chung, fashion designer
- Julie J. Chung, South Korean-born diplomat and Ambassador to Sri Lanka
- Paul Clemens, writer and journalist
- Elizabeth F. Cohen, political scientist
- Jessica Cohen, British-born Israeli-American literary translator
- Liz Cohen, artist
- Theodore Colbert III, businessman, engineer, and Chief Executive Officer for Boeing Defense, Space & Security (2022–2024)
- Myke Cole author
- Gabriella Coleman, anthropologist
- Vivianne Collins, Canadian-born television host
- Mitch Colvin, politician, mayor of Fayetteville, North Carolina (2017–present)
- Cesar Conde, media executive and chairman of the NBCUniversal News Group
- Matt Connors, artist
- Rachel Constantine, painter
- Anna Conway, artist
- Asantha Cooray, University professor
- Mitch Cope, artist and curator
- Julian Coryell, singer/songwriter and guitarist
- John Crane, politician
- Jennifer Crupi, metalworker
- Tim Cummings, actor and author
- Nick Curson, strength and conditioning coach
- Matt Curtin, computer scientist and entrepreneur
- Tony Pham, Vietnamese-born attorney and Director of U.S. Immigration and Customs Enforcement (2020)

== Deaths ==
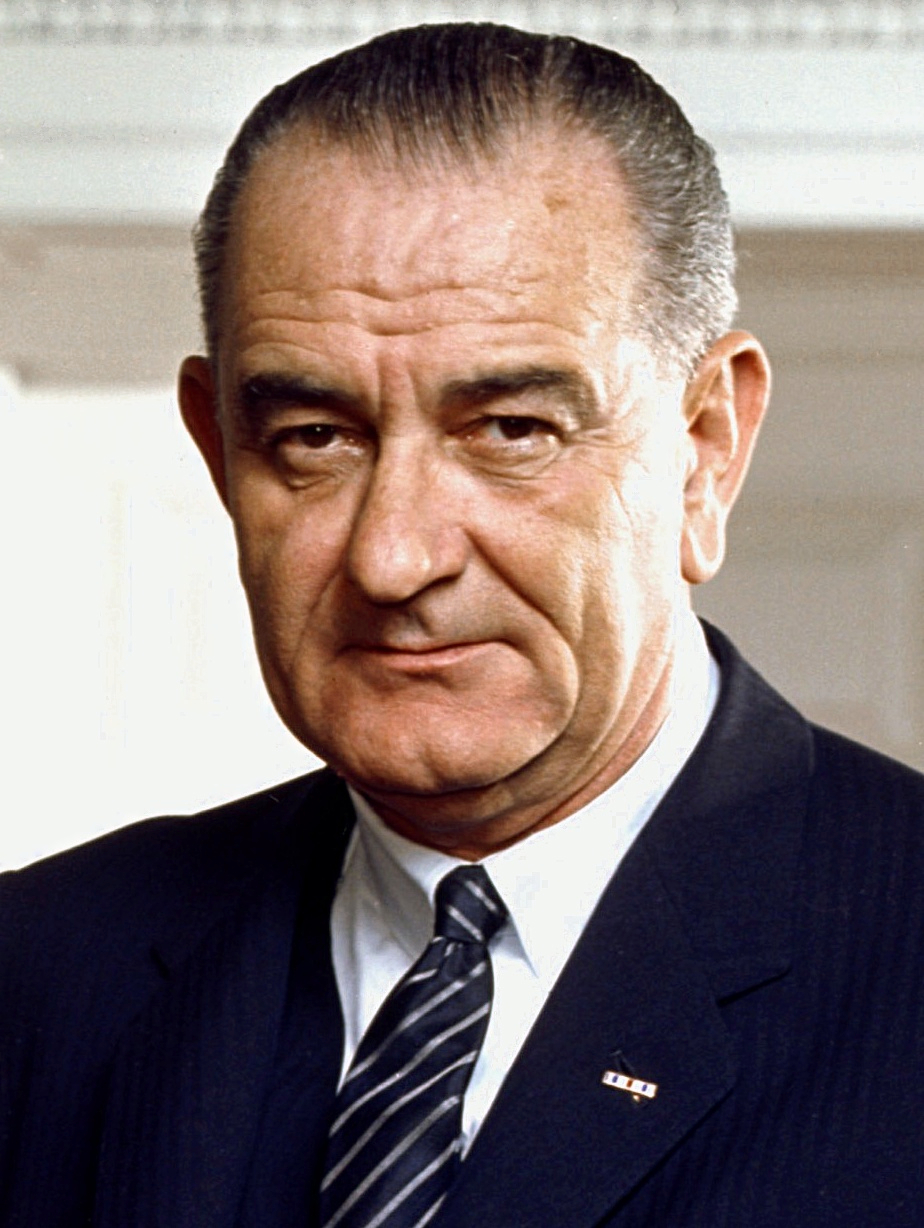
Lyndon B. Johnson

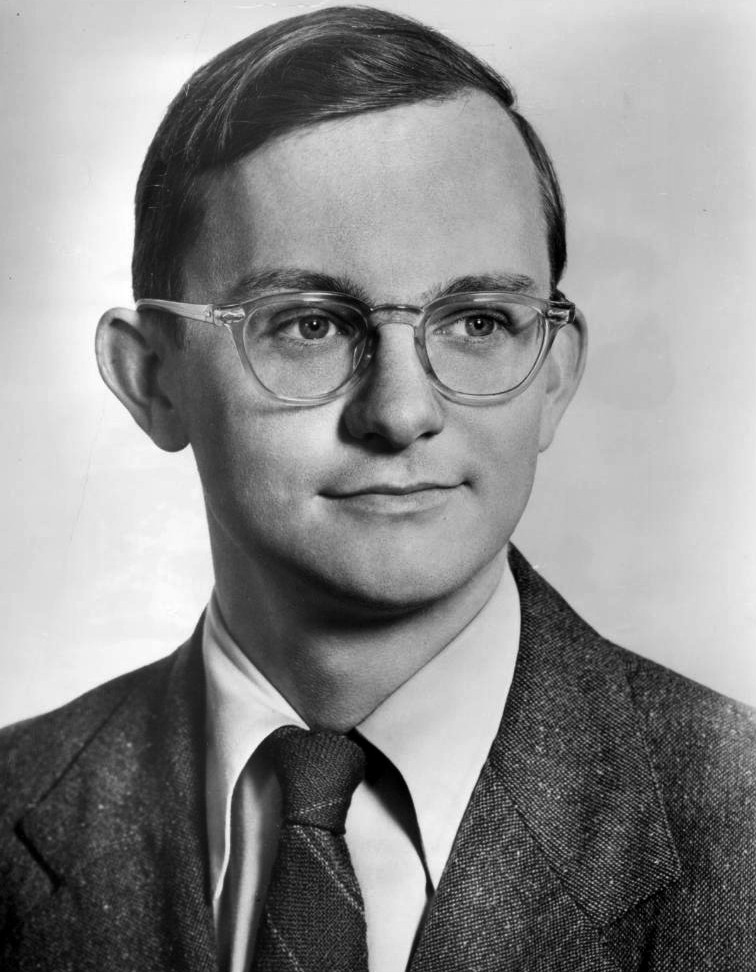
Wally Cox

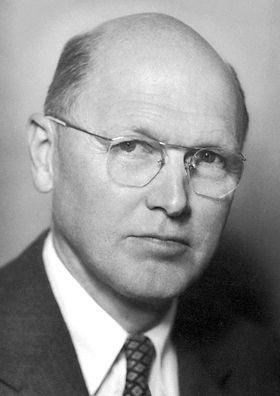
Dickinson W. Richards

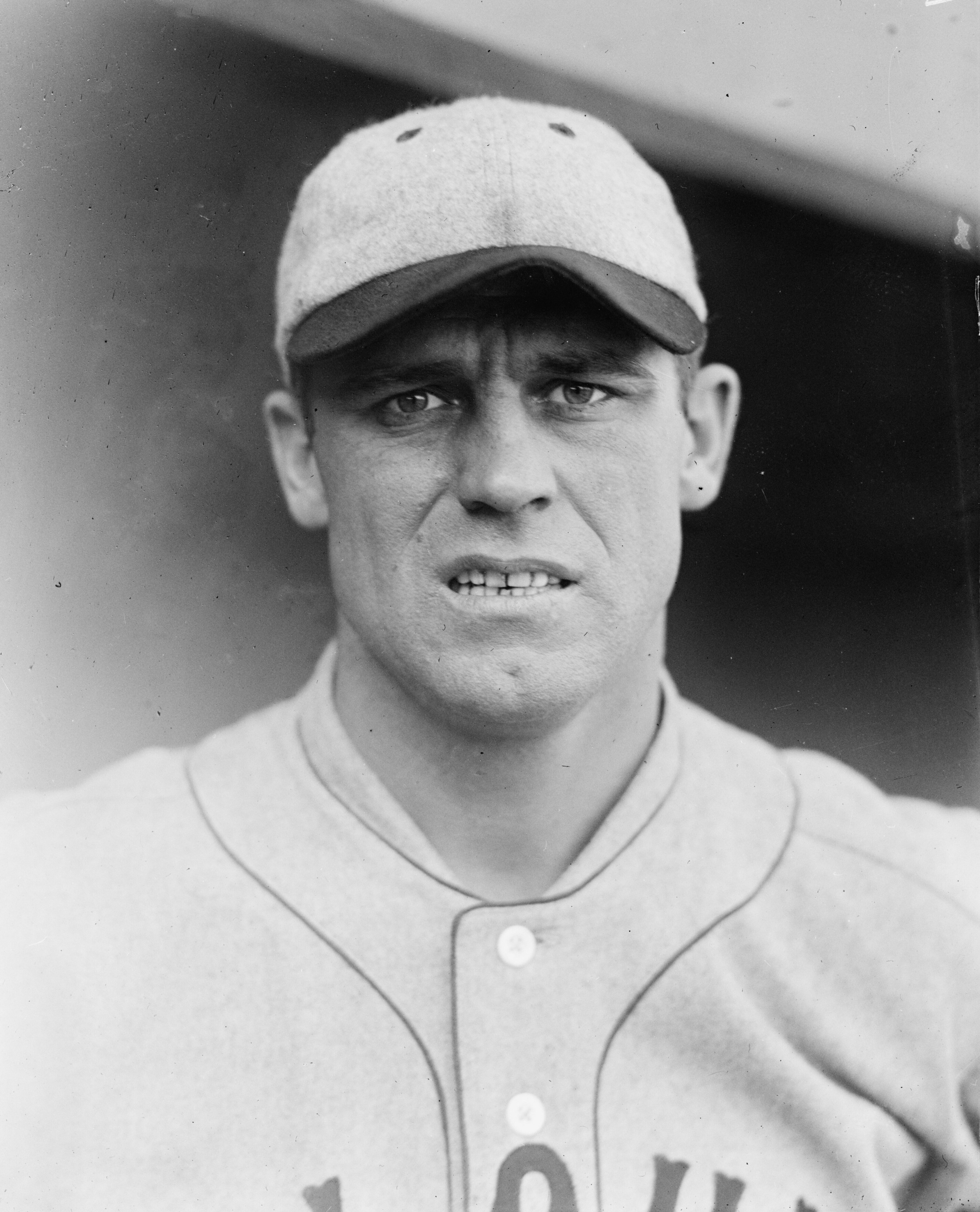
George Sisler

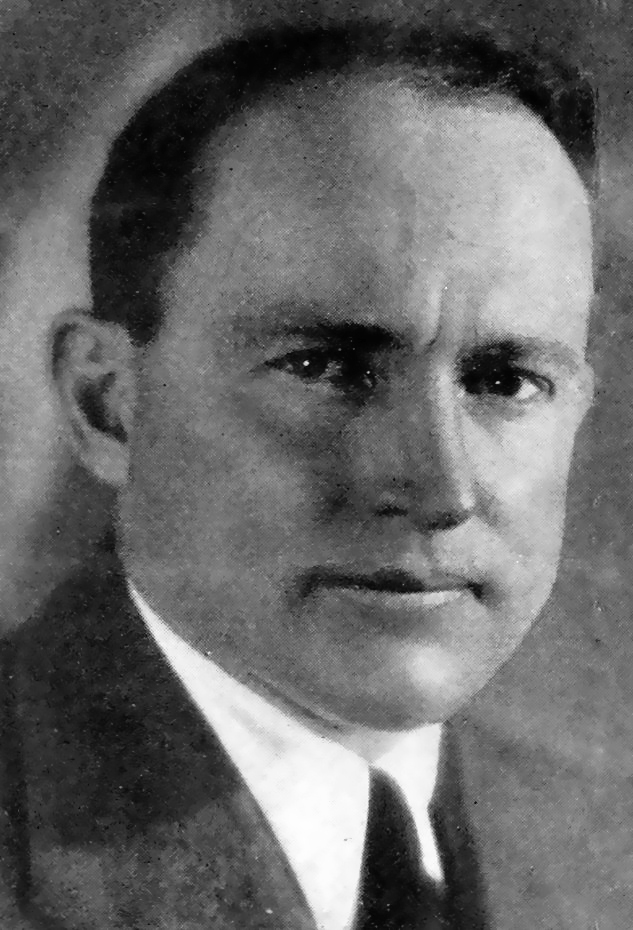
Merian C. Cooper

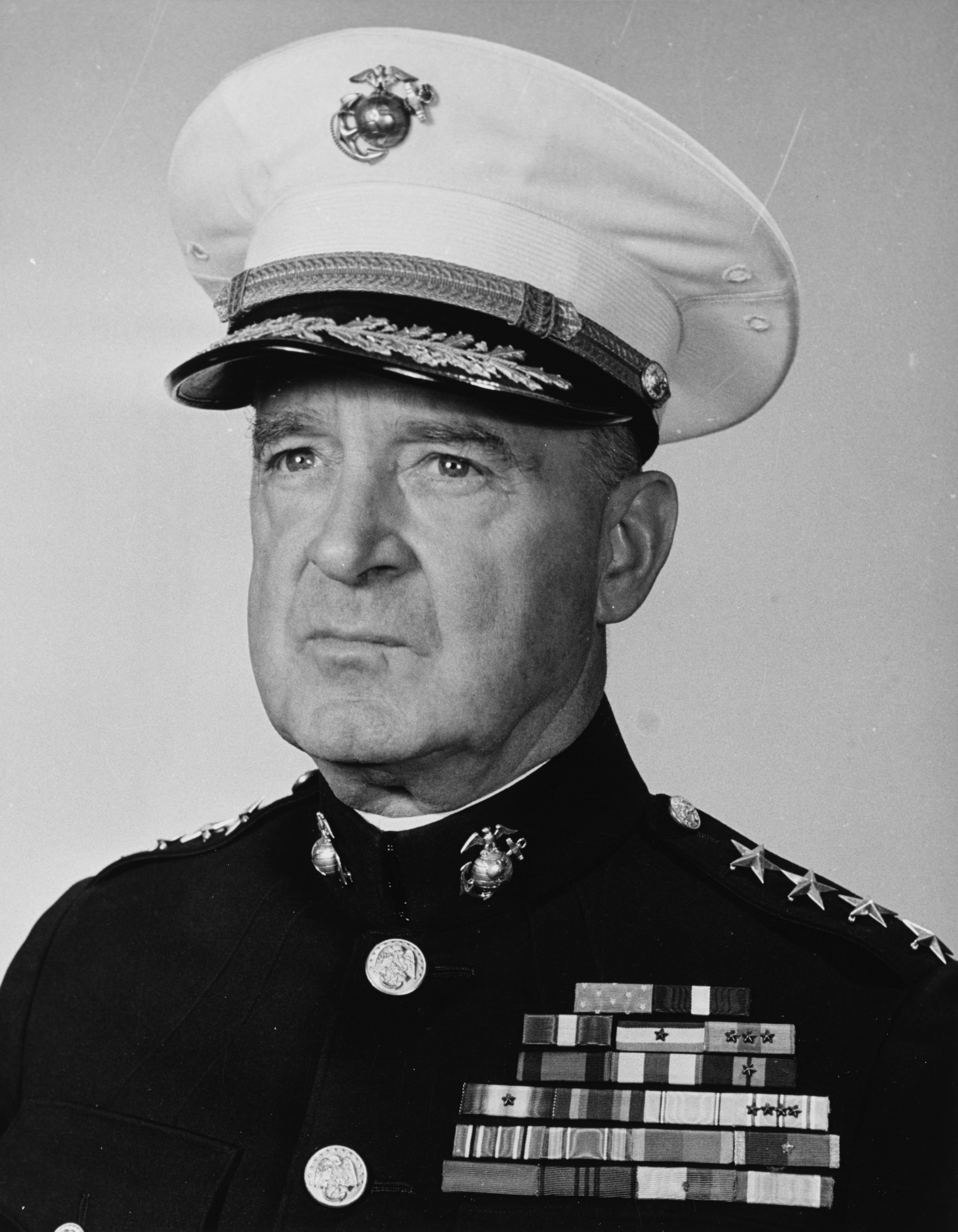
Alexander Vandegrift

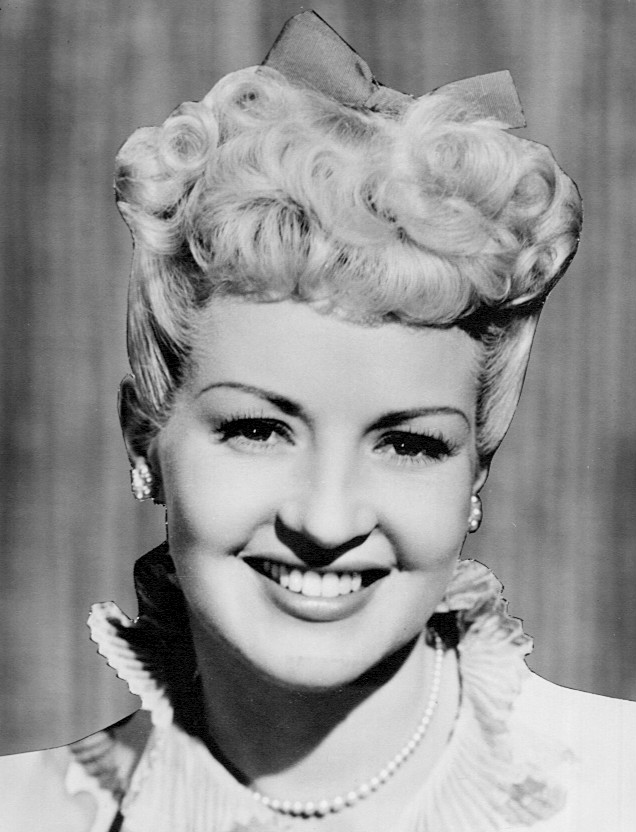
Betty Grable

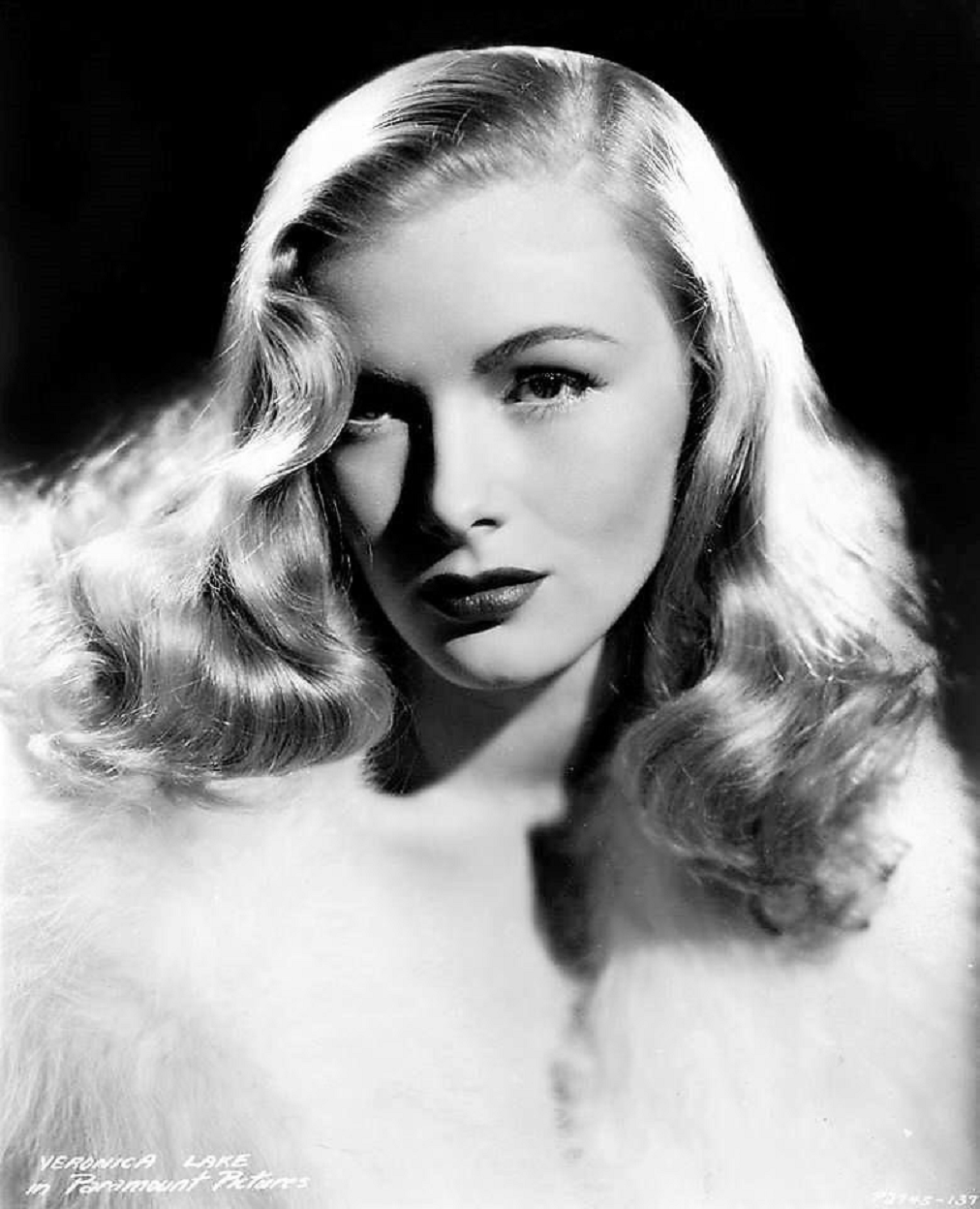
Veronica Lake

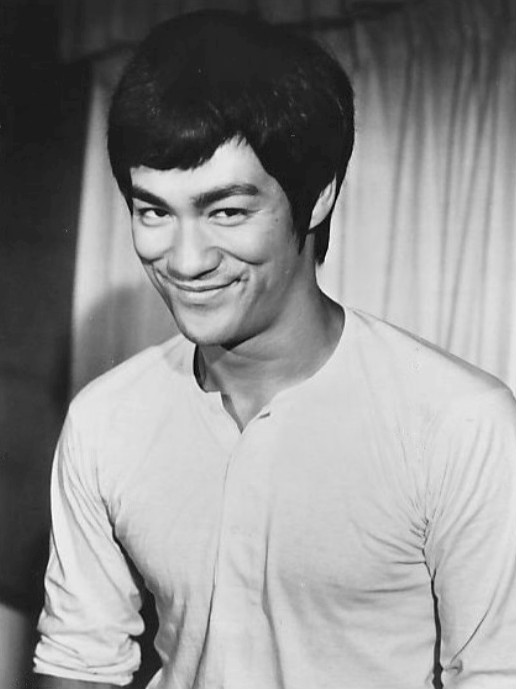
Bruce Lee

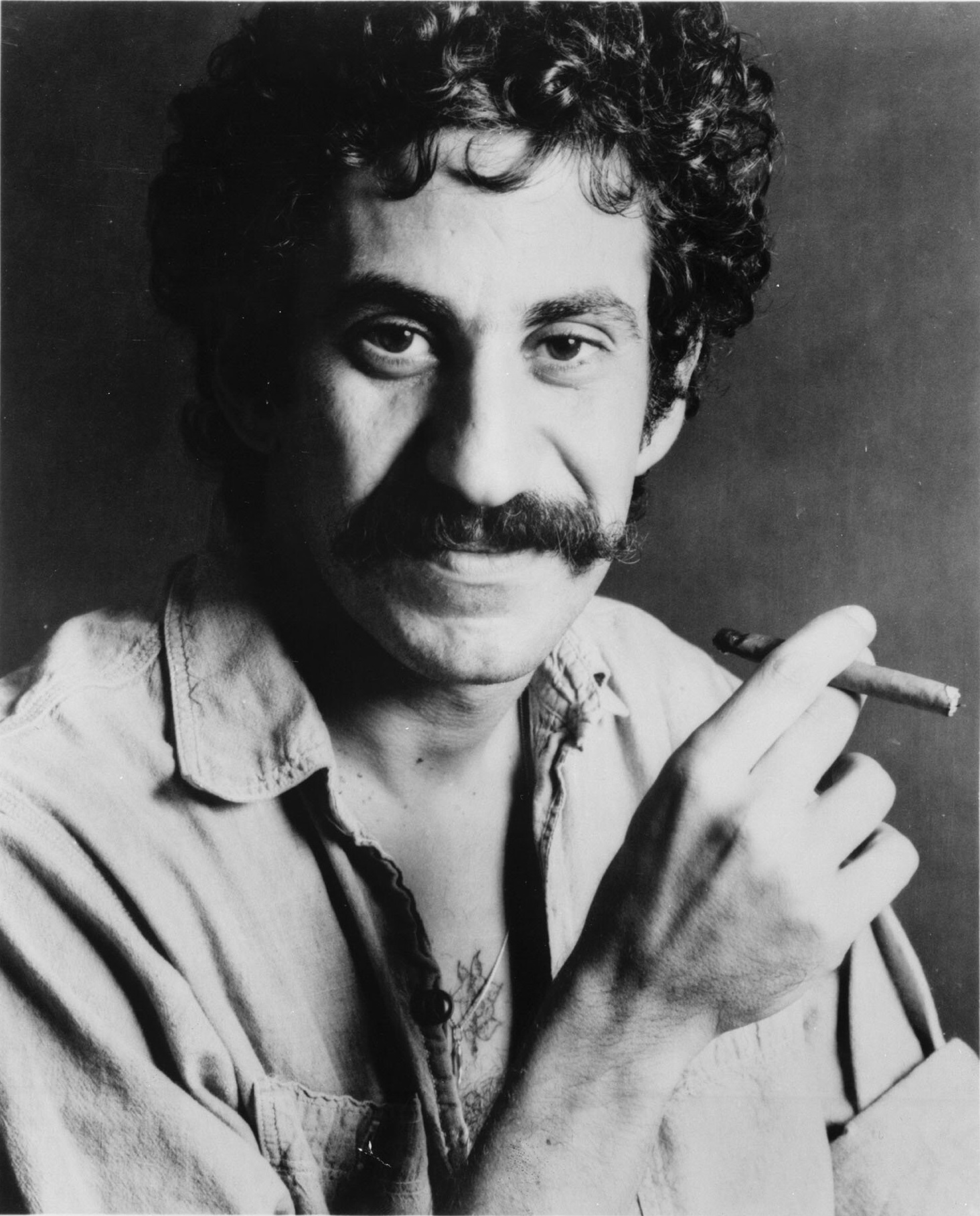
Jim Croce

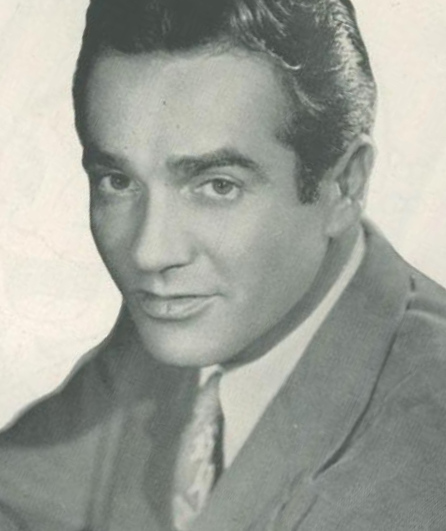
Gene Krupa

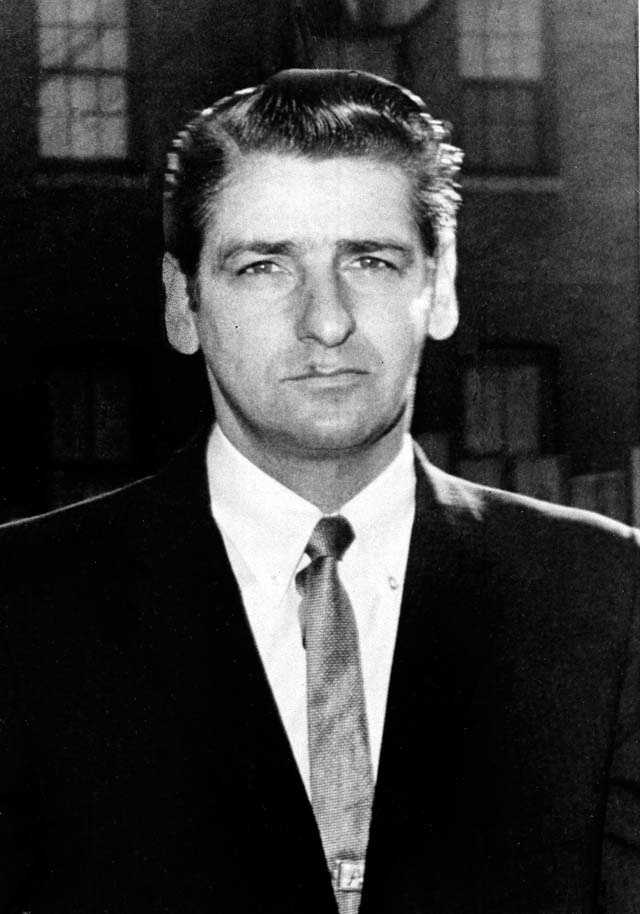
Albert DeSalvo

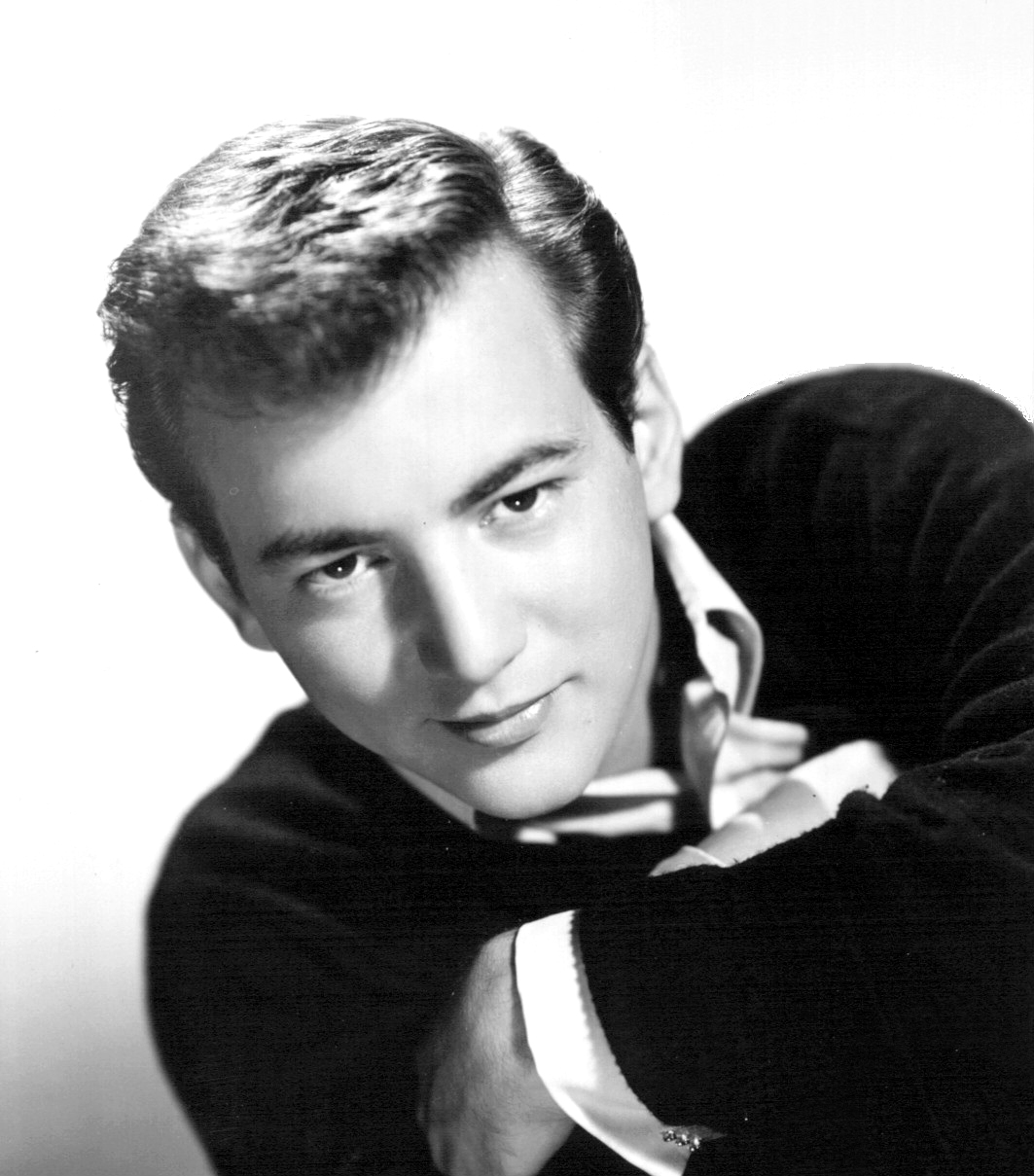
Bobby Darin

- January 11 – Isabel Randolph, actress (born 1889)
- January 17 – Herbert D. Riley, admiral (born 1904)
- January 22 – Lyndon B. Johnson, 36th president of the United States from 1963 until 1969, 37th vice president of the United States from 1961 until 1963 (born 1908)
- January 23 – Kid Ory, musician (born 1886)
- January 24 – J. Carrol Naish, actor (born 1896)
- January 26 – Edward G. Robinson, actor (born 1893)
- January 28 – John Banner, Austrian-born American actor (born 1910)
- January 30 – Elizabeth Baker, economist and academic (born 1885)
- February 9 – Max Yasgur, farmer (born 1919)
- February 15
  - Wally Cox, actor (born 1924)
  - Tim Holt, actor (born 1919)
- February 17 – Harold Saxton Burr, scientist (born 1889)
- February 18 – Frank Costello, Italian-born American Mafia gangster and crime boss (born 1891)
- February 23 – Dickinson W. Richards, physician, recipient of the Nobel Prize in Physiology or Medicine (born 1895)
- February 24 – Alice Hollister, silent film actress (born 1886)
- February 28 – Cecil Kellaway, South African actor (born 1890)
- March 6 – Pearl S. Buck, writer, Nobel Prize laureate (born 1892)
- March 8 – Ron "Pigpen" McKernan, rock musician (born 1945)
- March 12 – Frankie Frisch, baseball player (St. Louis Cardinals) and a member of the MLB Hall of Fame (born 1898)
- March 14
  - Howard H. Aiken, computing pioneer (born 1900)
  - Chic Young, cartoonist (born 1901)
- March 16 – Carl Benton Reid, actor (born 1893)
- March 18 – William Benton, U.S. Senator from Connecticut from 1949 until 1953 (born 1900)
- March 21 – Ray Williamson, California politician (b. 1895)
- March 23 – Ken Maynard, actor (born 1895)
- March 26 – George Sisler, baseball player (St. Louis Browns) and a member of the MLB Hall of Fame (born 1893)
- April 11 – Ted de Corsia, actor (b. 1903)
- April 12 – Arthur Freed, film producer (b. 1894)
- April 13 – Henry Darger, outsider artist and writer (b. 1892)
- April 20 – Robert Armstrong, actor (born 1890)
- April 21 – Merian C. Cooper, aviator, director and producer (born 1893)
- April 25 – Frank Jack Fletcher, admiral (born 1885)
- April 26 – Irene Ryan, actress (born 1902)
- May 2 – Alan Carney, actor (born 1909)
- May 6 – Myrna Fahey, actress (born 1933)
- May 8 – Alexander Vandegrift, general (born 1887)
- May 10 – Jack E. Leonard, comedian and actor (born 1910)
- May 11 – Lex Barker, actor (born 1919)
- May 12 – Frances Marion, screenwriter (born 1888)
- May 18 – Jeannette Rankin, first United States congresswoman (born 1880)
- May 21 – Vaughn Monroe, singer (born 1911)
- June 1 – Mary Kornman, actress (born 1915)
- June 3
  - Dory Funk, professional wrestler (born 1919)
  - Edward A. Brudno, American fighter pilot and prisoner of war during the Vietnam War (born 1940)
- June 21 – Frank Leahy, football player and coach (born 1908)
- June 23 – Fay Holden, actress (born 1893)
- June 24 – Mary Carr, actress (born 1874)
- June 26 – Ernest Truex, actor (born 1889)
- July 1 – Laurens Hammond, inventor (born 1895)
- July 2
  - Betty Grable, actress (born 1916)
  - George Macready, actor (born 1889)
- July 6 – Joe E. Brown, actor and comedian (born 1891)
- July 7 – Veronica Lake, actress (born 1922)
- July 8 – Gene L. Coon, screenwriter, producer, and novelist (born 1924)
- July 10 – Cordelia Camp, educator (born 1884)
- July 11 – Robert Ryan, actor (born 1909)
- July 12 – Lon Chaney Jr., actor (born 1906)
- July 13 – Turk Scott, politician (assassinated)
- July 15 – Clarence White, bluegrass and country guitarist and singer (born 1944)
- July 18 – Richard Remer, athlete (born 1883)
- July 20
  - Bruce Lee, actor, martial artist and filmmaker (born 1940)
  - Robert Smithson, artist (born 1938)
- July 23 – Eddie Rickenbacker, World War I flying ace and race car driver (born 1890)
- July 25 – Edgar Stehli, French-born American actor (born 1884)
- August 4 – Eddie Condon, jazz musician (born 1905)
- August 8 – Dean Corll, serial killer, rapist, kidnapper and torturer (born 1939
- August 9 – Charles Daniels, Olympic swimmer (born 1885))
- August 10 – Douglas Kennedy, actor (born 1915)
- August 11 – Peggie Castle, actress (born 1927)
- August 16 – Veda Ann Borg, actress (born 1915)
- August 17
  - Conrad Aiken, writer born 1889))
  - Paul Williams, singer (The Temptations) (born 1939)
- August 27 – Tol Avery, actor (born 1915)
- August 30 – Michael Dunn, a.k.a. Gary Neil Miller, dwarf actor and singer (born 1934)
- August 31 – John Ford, film director and producer (born 1894)
- September 1 – Anne Azgapetian, Russian-born Red Cross worker (born 1888)
- September 12 – Marjorie Merriweather Post, businesswoman (born 1887)
- September 13 – Betty Field, actress (born 1913)
- September 15 – Robert B. McClure, general (born 1896)
- September 19 – Gram Parsons, singer, songwriter, guitarist, and pianist (born 1946)
- September 20
  - Jim Croce, singer (born 1943)
  - Glenn Strange, actor (born 1899)
- September 28
  - Norma Crane, actress (born 1928)
  - Mantan Moreland, actor and comedian (born 1902)
- October 2 – Paul Hartman, dancer and actor (born 1904)
- October 6
  - Sidney Blackmer, actor (born 1895)
  - Buddy Roosevelt, actor and stunt performer (born 1898)
- October 7 – Bonner Fellers, United States Army general (born 1896)
- October 9 – Sister Rosetta Tharpe, gospel singer (born 1915)
- October 13 – Rita Hassan, theatre producer and critic (born 1915)
- October 14 – Edmund A. Chester, broadcaster and journalist (b. 1897)
- October 16 – Gene Krupa, jazz drummer, bandleader, and composer (born 1909)
- October 18
  - Walt Kelly, animator and cartoonist (born 1913)
  - Crane Wilbur, actor (born 1886)
- October 19 – Margaret C. Anderson, magazine publisher (born 1886)
- October 27 – Allan Lane, actor (born 1909)
- October 28 – Cleo Moore, actress (born 1928)
- November 10
  - David "Stringbean" Akeman, musician and comedian (born 1915)
  - Morton Deyo, admiral (born 1887)
- November 13 – Lila Lee, actress (born 1905)
- November 20 – Allan Sherman, comedy writer, television producer, and song parodist (born 1924)
- November 23 – Constance Talmadge, actress (born 1898)
- November 25 – Albert DeSalvo, criminal, suspect in the Boston Strangler case (born 1931)
- November 26 – Charles Evans Whittaker, Associate Justice of the Supreme Court of the United States (born 1901)
- November 27 – Frank Christian, jazz musician (born 1887)
- December 3 – Emile Christian, musician (born 1895)
- December 4 – Michael O'Shea, actor (born 1906)
- December 17 – Charles Greeley Abbot, astrophysicist (born 1872)
- December 20 – Bobby Darin, singer-songwriter, musician, actor, dancer, impressionist and TV presenter (born 1936)
- December 26
  - William Haines, actor (born 1900)
  - Harold B. Lee, president of the Church of Jesus Christ of Latter-day Saints (born 1899)

== See also ==
- List of American films of 1973
- Timeline of United States history (1970–1989)
