= East Bay Athletic League =

Coordinates: 37°40′50.49″N 121°45′41.44″W

- Formerly: East Bay Division of DVAL
- Founded: 1964
- Sports fielded: 17
- No. of teams: Amador Valley High School; California High School; Carondelet High School; De La Salle High School; Dougherty Valley High School; Dublin High School; Foothill High School; Granada High School; Livermore High School; Monte Vista High School; San Ramon Valley High School
- Headquarters: CA
- Region: East San Francisco Bay Area
- Official website: http://www.theebal.com/

The East Bay Athletic League (EBAL) is a high school sports league in the North Coast Section of the California Interscholastic Federation. The league was created in 1964; previously teams competed in the "East Bay Division" (EBD) of the Diablo Valley Athletic League (DVAL). Its member institutions are located in the eastern region of the San Francisco Bay Area, in the cities of Concord, Danville, San Ramon, Dublin, Pleasanton, and Livermore. In the fall of 2016 the EBAL expanded to a 10 team league (De La Salle competing in boys sports & Carondelet in girls sports) by adding Dublin High School, and Dougherty Valley High School. De La Salle stopped competing in EBAL Football in 2012-13 and competed as an Independent school in football. In 2018, De La Salle was re-admitted back into the EBAL Football League and now competes again for the league title. Also in 2018, the EBAL split its Football League into two "Divisions"; the Mountain Division (consisting of California, De La Salle, Foothill, San Ramon and Monte Vista) and the "Valley Division" (consisting of Amador Valley, Dougherty Valley, Dublin, Granada and Livermore). In 2020, Foothill moved to the Valley Division and in 2021, Amador Valley moved to the Mountain Division.

The league has 11 affiliated schools:

- Amador Valley High School, Pleasanton (1964-Current)
- California High School, San Ramon (1976-Current)
- Carondelet High School - (All Girls) Concord (2008-Current)
- De La Salle High School - (All Boys) Concord (2008-Current)
- Dougherty Valley High School, San Ramon (2007-2008, 2016-Current)
- Dublin High School, Dublin (1969-1988, 2016-Current)
- Foothill High School, Pleasanton (1976-Current)
- Granada High School, Livermore (1965-Current)
- Livermore High School, Livermore (1964-Current)
- Monte Vista High School, Danville (1972-1992, 1996-Current)
- San Ramon Valley High School, Danville (1972-Current)

Former members:

- Salesian High School (1964-1966)
- Berkeley High School (1996-2000)
- Liberty High School (Brentwood) (1964-1974)
- St. Vincent High School (Vallejo) (1964-1968)
- Albany High School (1964-1972)
- John Swett High School (1964-1972)
- San Leandro High School (1989-1991)

It also fields 17 sports:

- Badminton
- Baseball
- Basketball
- Cross Country
- Football
- Girls' Flag Football
- Golf
- Lacrosse
- Soccer
- Softball
- STUNT (Competitive Sport Cheer)
- Swimming & Diving
- Tennis
- Track and Field
- Volleyball
- Water Polo
- Wrestling

== Professional (Major League) alumni ==
Name	School	Year	Sport	Team(s)	Special Achievement
George Atkinson III	Granada High	2011	NFL Running Back	Oakland Raiders, Cleveland Browns and Kansas City Chiefs	
Louie Aguiar	Granada High	1984	NFL Punter	New York Jets, Kansas City Chiefs, Green Bay Packers and Chicago Bears	
Brad Bergesen	Foothill High	2004	NFL Punter/Place Kicker	Los Angeles Rams	
David Bingham	California High	2008	MLS Soccer Goalie	San Jose Earthquakes and LA Galaxy	Member 2016 United States National Team
Mike Burke	Amador Valley High	1968	NFL Punter/Place Kicker	Los Angeles Rams	
Mike Caldwell	San Ramon Valley High	1989	NFL Wide Receiver	San Francisco 49ers	
Chuck Cary	California High	1978	MLB Pitcher	Detroit Tigers, Atlanta Braves, New York Yankees and Chicago White Sox	
Brandon Crawford	Foothill High	2005	MLB Shortstop	San Francisco Giants	World Series Champion 2012 & 2014; 3 Time Consecutive Gold Glove Winner for Shortstop (2015-2017); Silver Slugger Award; Selected to 2015 National League All-Star Team.
Paula Creamer	Foothill High	2004	LPGA Golf Professional		10 Time Winner on LPGA Tour, including the US Women's Open in 2008. 5 seasons ranked in the World Top 10, reaching #4 in 2008. Solheim Cup Member from 2005 through 2015.
Kevin Crow	Amador Valley High	1978	MISL Soccer Defender	San Diego Sockers	NASL Indoor Champion (1) 1983–84; MISL Champion (7) 1984–85, 1985–86, 1987–88, 1988–89, 1989–90, 1990–91, 1991–92; MISL Defender of the Year (5) 1985, 1988, 1989, 1991, 1992; First Team All Star (6) NASL: 1984, MISL: 1985, 1987, 1988, 1990, 1991; 1984 US Olympic Team, 1988 US Olympic Team
Mike Crudale	Monte Vista High	1995	MLB Pitcher	St. Louis Cardinals and Milwaukee Brewers	
Mark Davis	Granada High	1978	MLB Pitcher	Philadelphia Phillies, San Francisco Giants, San Diego Padres, Kansas City Royals, Atlanta Braves, Philadelphia Phillies, San Diego Padres, Milwaukee Brewers	2× All-Star (1988, 1989), NL Cy Young Award (1989), NL Rolaids Relief Man of the Year (1989)
Troy Dayak	Livermore High	1988	MLS Soccer Defender	San Jose Earthquakes	
Taylor Dent	Monte Vista High	1999	ATP Tennis Professional		Winner of 4 ATP Tournaments. Represented United States at the 2004 Summer Olympics. Additionally, while at the 2010 Wimbledon Championships on June 23, 2010, set a record with the fastest serve ever recorded at Wimbledon at 148 mph.
Zach Ertz	Monte Vista High	2009	NFL Tight end	Philadelphia Eagles	Super Bowl Champion in 2017; 2017 Pro Bowl
Todd Fischer	Foothill High	1988	PGA Golf Pro		
Chris Geile	Amador Valley High	1982	NFL Offensive Guard	Detroit Lions	
John Gesek	San Ramon Valley High	1983	NFL Offensive Lineman	Los Angeles Raiders, Dallas Cowboys and Washington Redskins	
Gavin Glinton	Livermore High	1997	MLS Soccer Forward	Chicago Fire, Los Angeles Galaxy, Dallas Burn, Charleston Battery and San Jose Earthquakes	
Brandon Gonzales	Granada High	2002	Professional Boxer	Middleweight / Super Middleweight	21 Fights; 18-1-1 with 1 No-Decision
J.R. Graham	Monte Vista High	1995	MLB Pitcher	Minnesota Twins	
Bob Gregor	Monte Vista High	1974	NFL Defensive Back	San Diego Chargers	
Rob Heidger	San Ramon Valley High	1987	AVP Volleyball Player		Sydney 2000 Summer Olympics
Roy Helu	San Ramon Valley High	2006	NFL Running Back	Washington Redskins and Oakland Raiders	
Cory Higgins	Monte Vista High	2007	NBA Guard	Charlotte Hornets	
Austin Hooper	De La Salle High	2013	NFL Tight End	Atlanta Falcons	
Robert Jenkins	Dublin High	1981	NFL Offensive Tackle	Los Angeles Rams, Los Angeles Raiders and Oakland Raiders	
Brian Johnson	Granada High	1992	MLS Soccer Midfielder	Kansas City Wizards	
Randy Johnson	Livermore High	1982	MLB Pitcher	Montreal Expos, Seattle Mariners, Houston Astros, Arizona Diamondbacks, New York Yankees and San Francisco Giants	10× All-Star (1990, 1993–1995, 1997, 1999–2002, 2004), World Series champion (2001), 5× Cy Young Award (1995, 1999–2002), World Series MVP (2001), Triple Crown (2002), NL wins champion (2002), 4× ERA champion (1995, 1999, 2001, 2002), 9× Strikeout champion (1992–1995, 1999–2002, 2004), Pitched a no-hitter on June 2, 1990, Pitched a perfect game on May 18, 2004, Seattle Mariners Hall of Fame
Rick Kane	Amador Valley High	1972	NFL Running Back	Detroit Lions and Washington Redskins	
Brandon Kolb	San Ramon Valley High	1991	MLB Pitcher	San Diego Padres and Milwaukee Brewers	
Jeff Kopp	San Ramon Valley High	1990	NFL Linebacker	Miami Dolphins, Jacksonville Jaguars, Baltimore Ravens and the New England Patriots	
Greg Kragen	Amador Valley High	1980	NFL Defensive Lineman	Denver Broncos, Kansas City Chiefs and Carolina Panthers	
Joel Kribel	Amador Valley High	1995	PGA Golf Pro		
Sandy La Beaux	California High	1978	NFL & USFL Safety	Tampa Bay Buccaneers and Houston Gamblers	1981 NCAA Division II 400 Meter IM Hurdles National Champion
Mark Madsen	San Ramon Valley High	1994	NBA Power Forward	Los Angeles Lakers and the Minnesota Timberwolves	Assistant Coach for the Los Angeles Lakers
Sean Mannion	Foothill High	2010	NFL Quarterback	Los Angeles Rams	
Casey Merrill	Monte Vista High	1974	NFL Player	Green Bay Packers, New Orleans Saints, and the New York Giants	
Keith Millard	Foothill High	1981	NFL Defensive Linemen	Minnesota Vikings, Seattle Seahawks, Green Bay Packers and the San Francisco 49ers	Morris Trophy (1983), 2× Pro Bowl (1988, 1989), 2× First-team All-Pro (1988, 1989), 2× Second-team All-Pro (1986, 1987), NFL 1980s All-Decade Team, 1989 NFL Defensive Player of the Year, 1989 UPI NFC Player of the Year, Second-team All-Time USFL team, 50 Greatest Vikings
Eric Moran	Foothill High	1979	NFL Offensive Linemen	Houston Oilers	
Rich Moran	Foothill High	1981	NFL Offensive Linemen	Green Bay Packers	
Erwin Mueller	Livermore High	1962	NBA & ABA Center/Power Forward	Chicago Bulls, Los Angeles Lakers, Seattle SuperSonics, Detroit Pistons, Virginia Squires and the Memphis Tams	
Mike Noble	Monte Vista High	1981	NFL Player	Los Angeles Raiders, New York and New England Patriots	
Bob Otto	Foothill High	1980	NFL Defensive End	Dallas Cowboys and Houston Oilers	
Justin Peelle	Dublin High	1998	NFL Tight End	San Diego Chargers, Miami Dolphins, Atlanta Falcons, San Francisco 49ers and Pittsburgh Steelers	
Scott Peters	Amador Valley High	1997	NFL Offensive Lineman	Philadelphia Eagles, New York Giants, San Francisco 49ers, Carolina Panthers and the Arizona Cardinals	
Stephen Piscotty	Amador Valley High	2009	MLB outfielder	St. Louis Cardinals, Oakland Athletics	
Chris Pane	Livermore High	1971	NFL Defensive Back	Denver Broncos	
Brady Raggio	San Ramon Valley High	1990	MLB Pitcher	Arizona Diamondbacks and St. Louis Cardinals	
Bryan Shaw	Livermore High	2005	MLB Pitcher	Arizona Diamondbacks and Cleveland Indians	
Robby Smith	San Ramon Valley High	2016	US Olympian - Greco-Roman Wrestling		Finished 12th in 125 kg group of 2016 Rio Olympics
Jessica Steffens	Monte Vista High	2005	US Olympian - Water Polo		Silver Medalist on 2008 US Olympic Water Polo team; Gold Medalist on 2012 US Olympic Water Polo team.
Maggie Steffens	Monte Vista High	2012	US Olympian - Water Polo		Gold Medalist on 2012 US Olympic Water Polo team; Gold Medalist on 2016 US Olympic Water Polo team; tied Olympic record with 7 goals in a single game at 2012 Olympics.
Joe Terry	Amador Valley High	1987	NFL Linebacker	Seattle Seahawks	
Erick Threets	Granada High	1999	MLB Pitcher	San Francisco Giants and Chicago White Sox	
Jack Trudeau	Granada High	1980	NFL Quarterback	Indianapolis Colts, New York Jets and Carolina Panthers	
Chris Verhulst	California High	1984	NFL Tight end	Houston Oilers	
Brett Visintainer	San Ramon Valley High	2000	NFL Place Kicker	Dallas Cowboys	
Ryan Whalen	Monte Vista High	2007	NFL Wide Receiver	Cincinnati Bengals	
Laura Walker	California High	1988	US Olympian - Swimming		Member of Bronze Medalist United States women's 4×100-meter freestyle relay team at the 1988 Summer Olympics in Seoul, South Korea.
Andrew Wiedeman	California High	2007	MLS Soccer Goalie	FC Dallas, Toronto FC, Ottawa Fury FC	
Randy Winn	San Ramon Valley High	1992	MLB Outfielder	Tampa Bay Devil Rays, Seattle Mariners, San Francisco Giants, New York Yankees and St. Louis Cardinals	
Ryan Wright	California High	2018	NFL Punter	Minnesota Vikings	
Ned Yost	Dublin High	1972	MLB Catcher	Milwaukee Brewers, Texas Rangers and Montreal Expos	Manager of the Milwaukee Brewers from 2003–2008 and the Kansas City Royals from 2010-2019. Managed Royals to 2015 World Series Championship.

== League Champions ==
Former EBAL Champions
