= Village High School =

Public school in California, United States

Coordinates: 37°39′21″N 121°52′30″W

Information
- School district: Pleasanton Unified School District
- Enrollment: 85 (2024–2025)
- Website: village.pleasantonusd.net

Village High School (commonly called Village) is a public continuation high school located in Pleasanton, California, United States, a community in the San Francisco East Bay area. Village is a part of the Pleasanton Unified School District, which also includes Amador Valley High School and Foothill High School. The high school was formed for students from Amador Valley and Foothill with low grades, multiple absences, or credit deficiencies.

== Academics ==
Village is accredited by the Western Association of Schools and Colleges. The high school provides students with a four consecutive period core class. The school also offers other courses such as computers, bioscience, and foods.

== Enrollment ==
Village High School is predominantly White, with a large Hispanic or Latino minority. Smaller groups of minorities enrolled at the school include African Americans, American Indians, Asians, and Filipinos.

== Horizon School Age Parent Program ==
This program for school-aged parents runs at the school. It began as Horizon High School (commonly Horizon), a public high school for school-age mothers located in Pleasanton, California, a community in the San Francisco Bay Area. Horizon was also part of the Pleasanton Unified School District.
