= Monte Vista High School (Danville, California) =

Public high school in California, United States

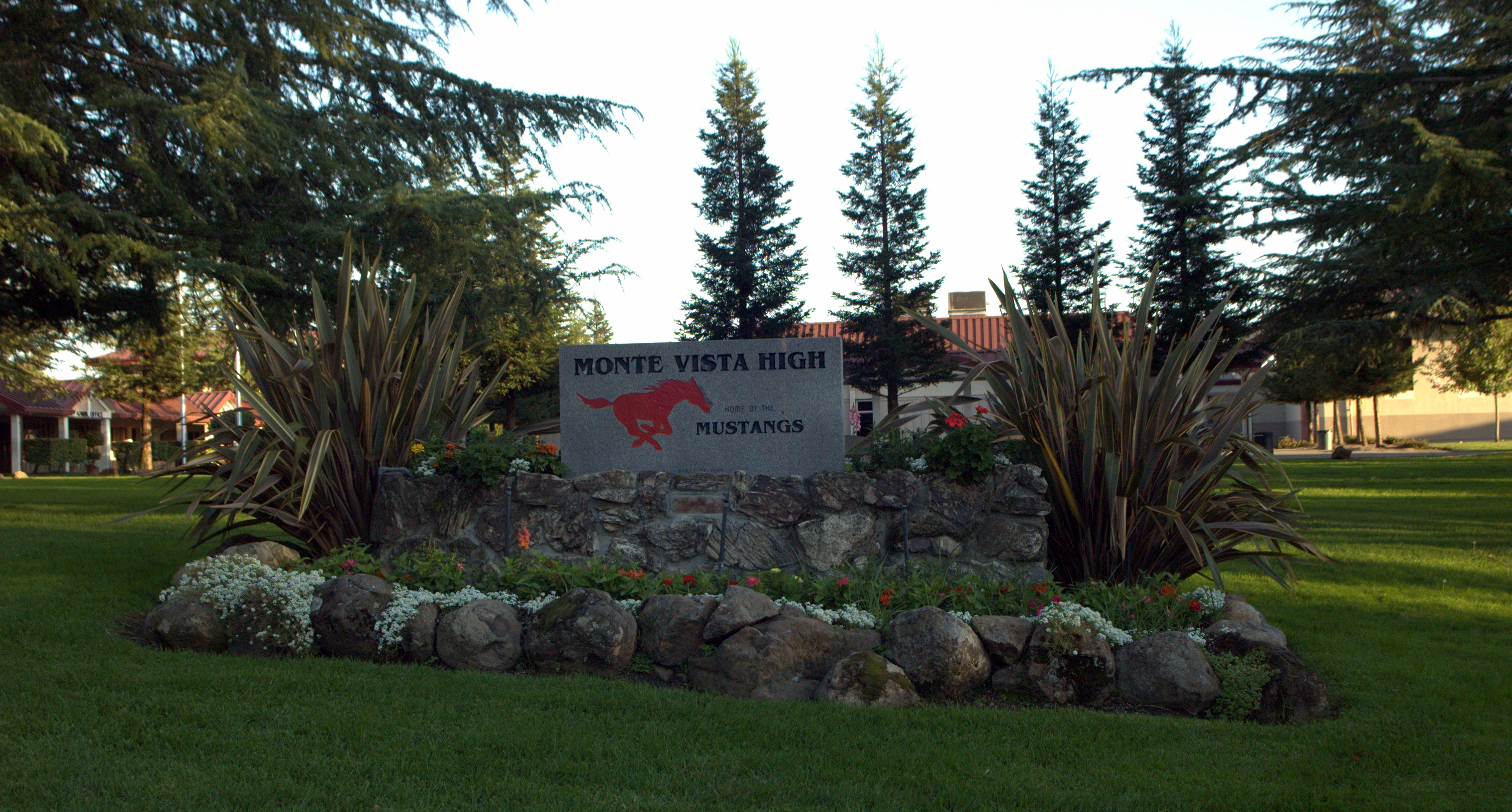

Location
- 3131 Stone Valley Road; Danville, California 94526; United States; 37°50′38″N 121°58′56″W

Information
- Type: Public
- Established: 1965
- School district: San Ramon Valley Unified School District
- Superintendent: CJ Cammack
- Principal: Kevin Ahern
- Teaching staff: 92.77 (on an FTE basis)
- Enrollment: 2,000 (2025–2026)
- Student to teacher ratio: 22.01
- Colors: Red and black
- Athletics conference: East Bay Athletic League
- Nickname: Mustangs
- Rival: San Ramon Valley High School
- Newspaper: The Stampede
- Yearbook: La Vista
- Website: mvhs.srvusd.net

Monte Vista High School is a comprehensive public high school located in Danville, California, United States. It is a National Blue Ribbon school, as well as a California Distinguished School. It is fully WASC accredited. The school is located in the San Ramon Valley, approximately 35 miles (56 km) east of San Francisco, and is part of the San Ramon Valley Unified School District. Their school mascot is a mustang.

== Academics ==
The school is fully accredited by the Western Association of Schools and Colleges, and offers college preparatory courses that are University of California A-G certified. As of 2025, Monte Vista offers 26 Advanced Placement courses and 13 honors courses. The school also offers courses through the California Association of Regional Occupational Centers and Programs.

== Sports ==
The Monte Vista Mustangs compete in the East Bay Athletic League (EBAL) of the CIF North Coast Section (NCS). They won the CIF championships in boys' basketball (2014) and girls' swimming (2017).

== Notable alumni ==
- Mark Appel, baseball pitcher
- David Brevik, video game designer/programmer
- Leroy Chiao, astronaut
- Mike Crudale, professional baseball player
- Taylor Dent, tennis player
- Jack Endries, NFL tight end
- Zach Ertz, NFL tight end
- Bob Gregor, NFL defensive back
- Jake Haener, NFL quarterback
- Nate Landman, NFL linebacker
- Corey Luciano, NFL offensive lineman
- Tim Kang, actor
- George Komsky, opera singer and songwriter
- Jeff Lockie, football player
- Casey Merrill, NFL defensive end
- Judah Miller, comedy writer
- Murray Miller, comedy writer
- Bob Myers, professional basketball general manager
- John Patitucci, jazz musician
- Chuck Prophet, musician
- Gar Ryness, comedian, 'Batting Stance Guy'
- Adam Schiff, member of US House of Representatives from California's 28th district (2001 – 2024) and US senator from California (2024 – present)
- Greg Sestero, actor and author
- Connor Shay, CFL linebacker
- Jessica Steffens, Olympic women's water polo
- Maggie Steffens, Olympic women's water polo
- Christy Turlington, model
- Bree Turner, actress
- Nicholas Vasallo, composer
- Joey Wagman, American-Israeli baseball player
- Ryan Whalen, NFL wide receiver
- Josh White, MLB pitcher
- Kevin Woo, K-pop musician
- Kyle Wright, football quarterback
- David Zuckerman, television producer
