= 1989 All-Pro Team =

Official list of the best NFL players in 1989

The 1989 All-Pro Team is composed of the National Football League players that were named to the Associated Press, Newspaper Enterprise Association, Pro Football Writers Association, Pro Football Weekly, and The Sporting News in 1989. Both first- and second- teams are listed for the AP and NEA teams. These are the five teams that are included in Total Football II: The Official Encyclopedia of the National Football League.

== Teams ==
Offense
Position	First team	Second team
Quarterback	Joe Montana, San Francisco 49ers (AP, NEA, PFWA, PFW, TSN)	Don Majkowski, Green Bay Packers (AP-2); Jim Everett, Los Angeles Rams (NEA-2)
Running back	Barry Sanders, Detroit Lions (AP, PFWA, PFW, TSN); Christian Okoye, Kansas City Chiefs (AP, NEA, PFWA, PFW, TSN); Thurman Thomas, Buffalo Bills (NEA)	Thurman Thomas, Buffalo Bills (AP-2); Barry Sanders, Detroit Lions (NEA-2); Dalton Hilliard, New Orleans Saints (AP-2, NEA-2)
Wide receiver	Sterling Sharpe, Green Bay Packers (AP, NEA, PFWA, PFW, TSN); Jerry Rice, San Francisco 49ers (AP, NEA, PFWA, PFW, TSN)	Andre Reed, Buffalo Bills (AP-2, NEA-2); Webster Slaughter, Cleveland Browns (AP-2); Mark Carrier, Tampa Bay Buccaneers (NEA-2)
Tight end	Keith Jackson, Philadelphia Eagles (AP, PFWA, TSN); Rodney Holman, Cincinnati Bengals (NEA, PFW)	Steve Jordan, Minnesota Vikings (NEA-2); Rodney Holman, Cincinnati Bengals (AP-2)
Tackle	Anthony Muñoz, Cincinnati Bengals (AP, NEA, PFWA, PFW, TSN); Jim Lachey, Washington Redskins (AP, PFW, TSN); Gary Zimmerman, Minnesota Vikings (PFWA); Jackie Slater, Los Angeles Rams (NEA)	Chris Hinton, Indianapolis Colts (AP-2, NEA-2); Lomas Brown, Detroit Lions (NEA-2); Jackie Slater, Los Angeles Rams (AP-2)
Guard	Tom Newberry, Los Angeles Rams (AP, PFWA, PFW, TSN); Bruce Matthews, Houston Oilers (AP, PFW-t, TSN); Mike Munchak, Houston Oilers (NEA, PFWA, PFW-t); Rich Moran, Green Bay Packers (NEA)	Mike Munchak, Houston Oilers (AP-2); Tom Newberry, Los Angeles Rams (NEA-2); Bruce Matthews, Houston Oilers (NEA-2); Max Montoya, Cincinnati Bengals (AP-2)
Center	Jay Hilgenberg, Chicago Bears (AP, NEA, PFWA, PFW); Kent Hull, Buffalo Bills (TSN)	Kirk Lowdermilk, Minnesota Vikings (NEA-2); Kent Hull, Buffalo Bills (AP-2)

Special teams
Position	First team	Second team
Kicker	Mike Cofer, San Francisco 49ers (AP, NEA); Eddie Murray, Detroit Lions (PFWA, PFW); Mike Lansford, Los Angeles Rams (TSN)	Eddie Murray, Detroit Lions (AP-2); Mike Lansford, Los Angeles Rams (NEA-2)
Punter	Sean Landeta, New York Giants (AP, PFWA, PFW, TSN); Greg Montgomery, Houston Oilers (NEA)	Rich Camarillo, Phoenix Cardinals (AP-2); Reggie Roby, Miami Dolphins (NEA-2)
Kick Returner	Rod Woodson, Pittsburgh Steelers (AP, PFWA, PFW, TSN)	John Taylor, San Francisco 49ers (AP-2)
Punt Returner	Walter Stanley, Detroit Lions (PFW, TSN); Dave Meggett, New York Giants (PFWA)	
Special Teams	Rufus Porter, Seattle Seahawks (PFW)	

Defense
Position	First team	Second team
Defensive end	Chris Doleman, Minnesota Vikings (AP, NEA, PFWA, PFW, TSN); Reggie White, Philadelphia Eagles (AP, NEA, PFWA, PFW); Lee Williams, San Diego Chargers (TSN)	Lee Williams, San Diego Chargers (AP-2); Howie Long, Los Angeles Raiders (NEA-2); Bruce Smith, Buffalo Bills (AP-2, NEA-2)
Defensive tackle	Michael Dean Perry, Cleveland Browns (AP, NEA, PFWA, TSN); Keith Millard, Minnesota Vikings (AP, NEA, PFWA, PFW, TSN); Jerry Ball, Detroit Lions (PFW)	Ray Childress, Houston Oilers (AP-2); Tony Casillas, Atlanta Falcons (AP-2); Jerry Ball, Detroit Lions (NEA-2); Jerome Brown, Philadelphia Eagles (NEA-2)
Middle linebacker	Karl Mecklenburg, Denver Broncos (AP, NEA, PFWA, PFW); Mike Singletary, Chicago Bears (AP, PFWA, PFW, TSN); Vaughan Johnson, New Orleans Saints (NEA); Eugene Lockhart, Dallas Cowboys (TSN)	Billy Ray Smith, San Diego Chargers (NEA-2); Mike Walter, San Francisco 49ers (NEA-2); Vaughan Johnson, New Orleans Saints (AP-2); Eugene Lockhart, Dallas Cowboys (AP-2)
Outside linebacker	Tim Harris, Green Bay Packers (AP, NEA, PFWA, PFW, TSN); Lawrence Taylor, New York Giants (AP, PFWA, PFW); Kevin Greene, Los Angeles Rams (NEA, TSN)	Pat Swilling, New Orleans Saints, (AP-2, NEA-2); Lawrence Taylor, New York Giants (NEA-2); Kevin Greene, Los Angeles Rams (AP-2)
Cornerback	Eric Allen, Philadelphia Eagles (AP, PFW); Albert Lewis, Kansas City Chiefs (AP, NEA, PFWA, PFW, TSN); Mark Collins, New York Giants (NEA); Jerry Gray, Los Angeles Rams (PFWA); Gill Byrd, San Diego Chargers (TSN)	Frank Minnifield, Cleveland Browns (AP-2, NEA-2); Jerry Gray, Los Angeles Rams (AP-2); Eric Allen, Philadelphia Eagles (NEA-2)
Safety	Ronnie Lott, San Francisco 49ers (AP, PFWA, PFW); David Fulcher, Cincinnati Bengals (AP, PFWA, PFW, TSN); Joey Browner, Minnesota Vikings (NEA); Tim McDonald, Phoenix Cardinals (NEA); Harry Hamilton, Tampa Bay Buccaneers (TSN)	Erik McMillan, New York Jets (NEA-2); Dennis Smith, Denver Broncos (AP-2); David Fulcher, Cincinnati Bengals (NEA-2); Joey Browner, Minnesota Vikings (AP-2)

== Key ==
- AP = Associated Press first-team All-Pro
- AP-2 = Associated Press second-team All-Pro
- NEA = Newspaper Enterprise Association first-team All-Pro team
- NEA-2 = Newspaper Enterprise Association second-team All-Pro team
- PFW = Pro Football Weekly All-Pro team
- PFWA = Pro Football Writers Association All-NFL
- TSN = The Sporting News All-Pro
