= Amador Valley High School =

Public high school in Pleasanton, California

Location
- 1155 Santa Rita Road; Pleasanton, California 94566; United States; 37°40′06″N 121°52′28″W

Information
- Former name: Amador Valley Joint Union High School
- Type: Public high school
- Motto: School of Champions
- Established: 1922; 104 years ago
- School district: Pleasanton Unified School District
- Superintendent: Maurice Ghysels (interim)
- CEEB code: 052495
- NCES School ID: 060002009282
- Principal: Malcolm Norrington
- Teaching staff: 110.72 (on an FTE basis) (2024–2025)
- Grades: 9–12
- Gender: Coeducational
- Enrollment: 2,583 (2024–2025)
- Student to teacher ratio: 23.33
- Campus type: Suburban
- Colors: Purple and Gold
- Athletics conference: East Bay Athletic League
- Mascot: The Don
- Rival: Foothill High School
- Accreditation: Western Association of Schools and Colleges
- Newspaper: The Amadon (est. 1930)
- Yearbook: The Book of Names and Faces
- Feeder schools: Harvest Park Middle School; Pleasanton Middle School; Hart Middle School
- Website: amador.pleasantonusd.net

Amador Valley High School is a comprehensive public high school in Pleasanton, California, United States. It is one of three high schools in the Pleasanton Unified School District, along with Foothill High School and Village High School.

Founded as Amador Valley Joint Union High School (AVJUHS), it graduated its first class in 1923. Major construction and renovations were undertaken after district voters approved bonds in 1922, 1965, 1997, and 2016.

The school is a four-time California Distinguished School and a three-time National Blue Ribbon School. In national competitions such as We the People: The Citizen and the Constitution, the Amador Valley team has won the 1995 and 2022 national titles. The Amador Valley Wind Ensembles have performed at national venues and conferences, including Carnegie Hall and the Midwest Clinic. Several Amador Valley athletic teams have won multiple California Interscholastic Federation North Coast Section Division I titles since 2010, including the softball team which MaxPreps named 2014 mythical national champion following a perfect season.

== History ==
=== Region and districts ===
Amador Valley High School, originally Amador Valley Joint Union High School, was named for its location in the Amador Valley (part of the Tri-Valley area of the San Francisco East Bay). The valley's namesake was a wealthy Californio rancher, Don José María Amador. The school selected the Don as its mascot, in honor of the title used by Amador; Don is a Spanish term used as a mark of high esteem for a distinguished nobleman or gentleman.

Amador Valley High School is located in Pleasanton, California. While Pleasanton provided elementary and middle school education since its early years, students proceeding to high school attended nearby Livermore High School until 1924. Out of concerns of overcrowding and transportation for the commuting students, Pleasanton parents and students advocated for a local high school in the early 1920s. The activism culminated in a voter bond referendum on March 14, 1922, to establish the Amador Valley Joint Union High School District (AVJUHSD) and build the high school. Amador Valley's first class graduated in 1923.

From 1922 to 1988, the school was part of the AVJUHSD. This district taught high school students from Pleasanton, nearby Dublin, and the local rural community. The Federal Aid Highway Act of 1956 led to the building of a series of local freeways and increased population and student enrollment. In 1969, the school reached its maximum capacity, about 1,895 students. To accommodate the larger student population, Dublin High School was founded as part of the AVJUHSD. Both schools held classes on the Amador Valley campus during the 1968–69 school year. A continued influx of families to the area prompted the foundation of another high school within the AVJUHSD, Foothill, in 1973.

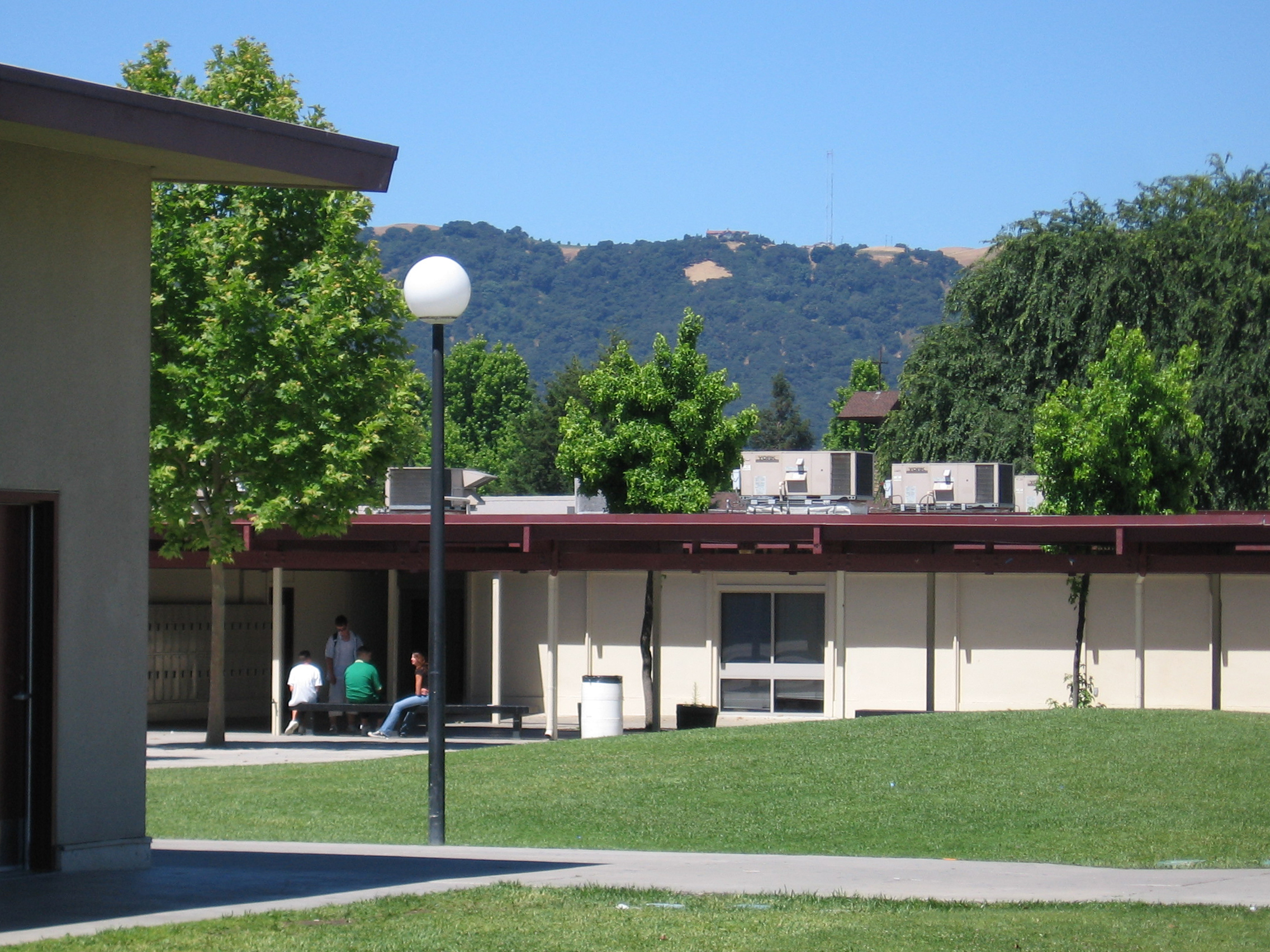
Campus of Amador Valley High School

Following a 1988 ballot measure, the AVJUHSD merged with the Pleasanton Joint School District to form the Pleasanton Unified School District. Prior to the district unification, the AVJUHSD operated Amador Valley High School, Foothill High School, and Dublin High School. Dublin High School was annexed into the Dublin Unified School District. As of 2022, the Pleasanton Unified School District contained two comprehensive high schools (Amador Valley and Foothill), one continuation high school (Village), three middle schools, nine elementary schools, one preschool, and an adult education program.

The school grounds are bordered on the east and southeast by Santa Rita Road, a Union Pacific railroad track on which the Altamont Corridor Express runs, and Arroyo Valle. To the north are several businesses and residential districts lie on the western border. The campus is the launch point for annual community parades and protests, including the Alameda County Fair Fall Festival Parade and the Tri-Valley Women's March.

=== Development ===
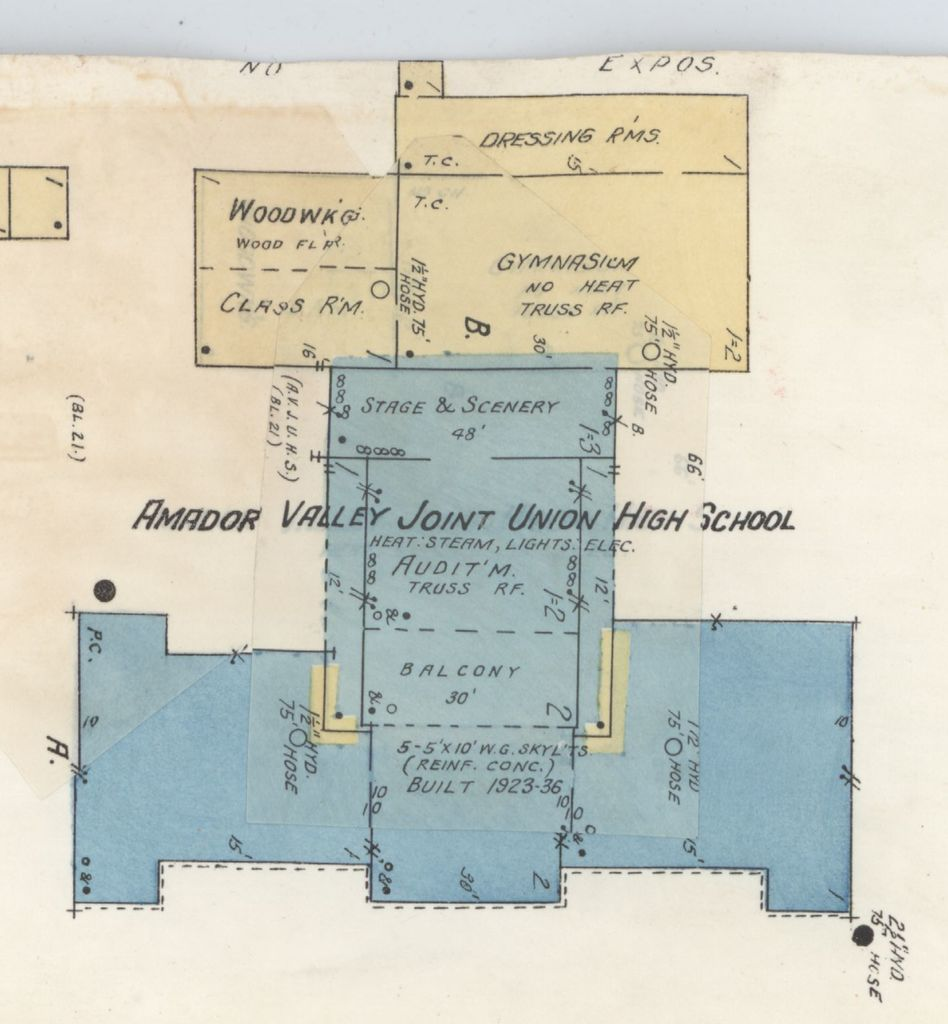
1926 Sanborn maps architectural drawing of Amador Valley Joint Union High School, showing the Amador Theatre, the gymnasium with dressing rooms, and two classrooms.

Classes were first held at Amador Valley on August 14, 1922, at the school's initial location at the Pleasanton Grammar School, serving 59 students. The first class of eight students graduated in 1923, and the school quickly became known for its municipal bands and sports teams.

The initial school land, building, furnishings, and upkeep was funded by a $110,000 bond authorized by district voters on September 26, 1922. Construction started in 1923 on the Rancho Valle de San Jose property, to accommodate 200 students upon its completion in 1924. The initial school building was built in Mediterranean Revival style and included "five regular recitation rooms, a science laboratory with lecture room, a sewing room, a cooking room, a room for commercial branches, two drawing rooms, a shop with two connecting work rooms, a library, a reception room and office for the principal, a teachers' room, a nurses' room, and gymnasium".

Pleasanton mothers started a school lunch program in 1927 to provide students with a better environment for learning. Parents donated pots and pans, and a newly hired cook prepared lunches, to be eaten at new tables and benches. The tables and benches were constructed by the custodian and the music teacher from the wood of horse stalls formerly on the campus. This project led to the formation of a Parent-Teacher Association (PTA) chapter at Amador Valley in the late 1920s.

District voters approved a $1.5 million school bond issue in 1965, with the authority to borrow up to $5 million more. The bond was directed towards site procurements and new construction. Much of the "original" Amador Valley High School building was demolished then significantly reconfigured in 1968.

The Amador Theater was added to the main campus building in 1932. As of 2019, the theater remains the city's largest performing arts facility. The theater has hosted school plays, band concerts, performances, lectures, and assemblies. The theater survived the demolition of the rest of the campus in 1968 and was restored after a community fundraising effort. The Amador Theater underwent another substantial renovation and expansion between 1981 and 1989, at a total cost of $2 million. The project was mostly funded by the City of Pleasanton, which took ownership of the theater the same year. The land under the theater remained owned by the school district.

The teachers union and the Pleasanton school districts failed to come to an agreement on a contract for the 1985–86 school year. In protest of a breakdown in negotiations, Amador Valley teachers went on a rolling strike in 1986. The school brought in substitutes to replace the picketing teachers. After over a week of walkouts and negotiation including a state mediator, the teachers went back to work having won immediate 8 percent pay raises. Amador Valley teachers are unionized under the Association of Pleasanton Teachers, California Teachers Association, and National Education Association. As of the 2021–22 school year, the average teacher salary is $88,971, which is 3% more than the average California teacher salary of $86,376.

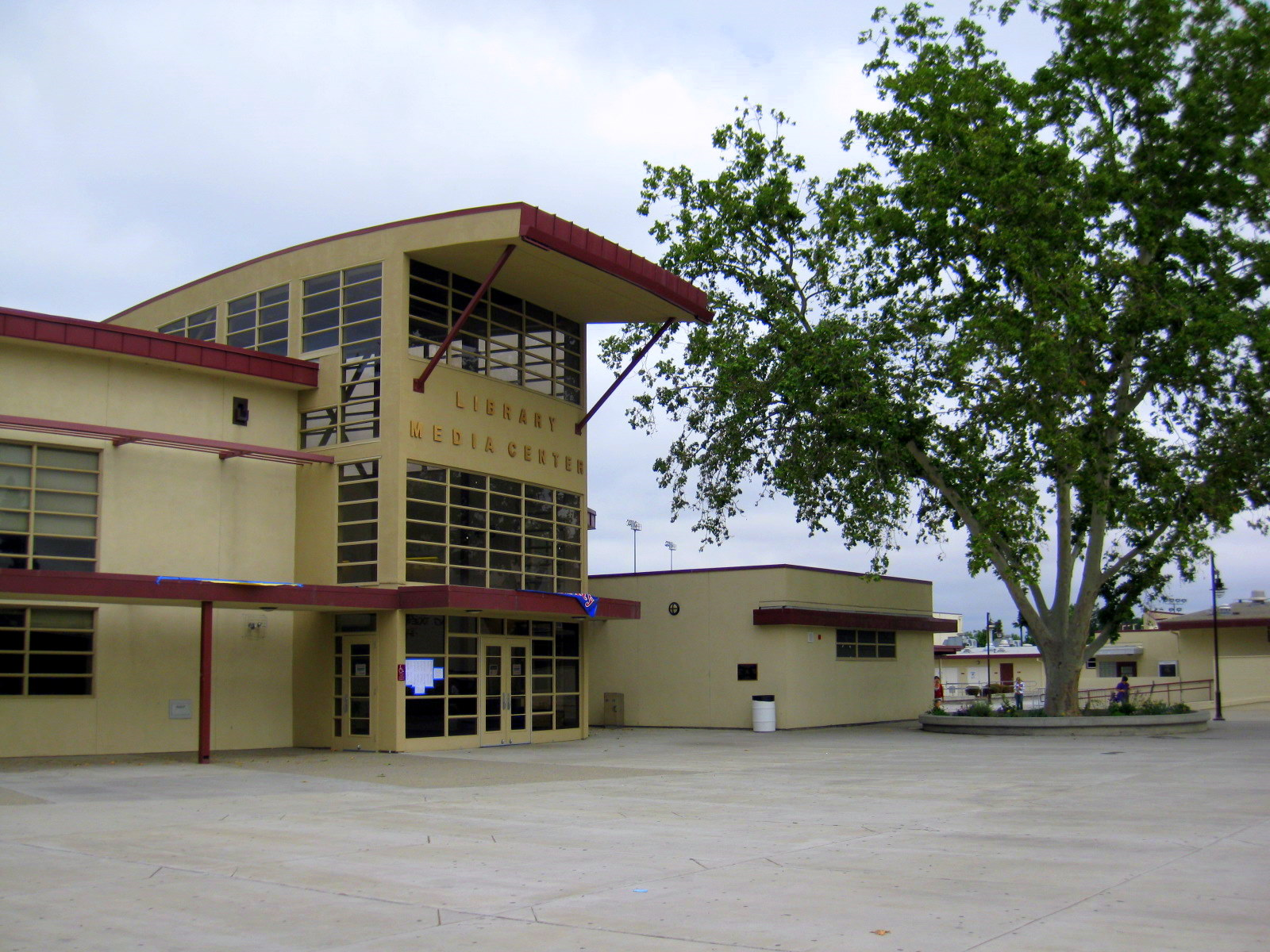
The library and media center, opened in 2002, is the tallest building on the Amador Valley campus.

The city passed a general obligation bond, Measure B, in 1997. The bond granted the school district $69 million to replace old and crowded facilities and modernize the school campus. The measure enabled the addition of renovated science classrooms, a multipurpose room, a library and media center, and a sound-proofed music building. The parking lot and central quad were expanded, with more than 550 parking spaces in the new lot, and classrooms were equipped to be more energy efficient. A new two-story building was completed in 2004, containing twenty-four classrooms. The following year, the school aquatic center was remodeled.

City voters passed another general obligation bond, Measure I1, in 2016. This was the district's first bond passed since Measure B in 1997. The bond granted $270 million to the school district to repair and improve district facilities, as well as provide new science equipment and learning technology. As a part of these renovations, the school district constructed a two-story instructional building on the Amador Valley campus, including "five standard classrooms, three science classrooms, two computer science labs, and two rooms specifically for special day class students". Construction commenced in 2020 and concluded in 2022, at a total cost of $18,400,000.

The passage of Prop 39 funded the 2019 addition of solar panels to the student parking lot. The cost of $650,000 is projected to save about $1.8 million in electricity costs over 25 years. The solar panels provide renewable electricity to the high school and create covered parking in a re-oriented lot.

=== Court cases ===
The AVJUHSD challenged the constitutionality of the 1978 California Proposition 13, which placed a cap state-wide on county real estate taxes. The proposition limited property tax assessments to the 1975 standard, eliminating $7 billion of $11.4 billion in annual property tax revenue to the state. According to The Washington Post, the "severe" limitations this imposed on state funding forced local governments and most school districts in California to make "drastic cutbacks". A 1978 article in the Los Angeles Times predicted that the proposition would jeopardize the state's ability to receive about $98 million of Federal Impact Aid each year since the state could not maintain prior levels of spending.

The district argued that the measure was "so drastic and far-reaching that it was 'a revision' of the state Constitution and not a mere amendment". The district was unsuccessful in its suit. In their ruling, the judges distinguished between "amendment" and "revision". The court confirmed that an initiative cannot "revise" the constitution; Proposition 13, however, was an amendment to the California Constitution and not a "revision". In 2009, Amador Valley was cited by dissenting Justice Carlos R. Moreno in arguing the non-constitutionality of California Proposition 8.

Amador Valley administrators censored 1999 Salutatorian Nicholas Lassonde's graduation speech for being "too religious", claiming that it "violated separation of church and state". Lassonde filed suit against the school district and school principal, claiming that the censorship violated his First Amendment rights. In Lassonde v. Pleasanton Unified School District, the United States Court of Appeals for the Ninth Circuit ruled against Lassonde citing a precedent from Cole v. Oroville Union High School District (9th Cir. 2000). The court upheld the censoring of student graduation speeches, concluding that in this case, "if the school had not censored the speech, the result would have been a violation of the Establishment Clause".

== Academics ==
=== Enrollment ===
As of the 2023–24 school year, the school had an enrollment of 2,574 students and 112.43 classroom teachers (on an FTE basis), for a student–teacher ratio of 22.89. Seven percent of Amador Valley students are involved in special education, three percent qualify for English language learner support, and eight percent qualify for free or reduced-price lunch. School enrollment grew 27% between 2000 and 2005, primarily because of new residential development. After 2005, enrollment growth slowed to an average of four percent per half-decade as of 2020. Enrollment across the Pleasanton Unified School District peaked during the 2018–19 school year, with yearly declines since 2021–22. The enrollment decline accelerated due to the COVID-19 pandemic. Amador Valley reached a peak enrollment of 2,744 students during 2020–21 school year. The school district forecasted that enrollment at Amador Valley would fall by nearly 500 students by 2028.

Despite relatively stable enrollment since 2005, the school has seen shifts in demographics by ethnicity. Between 2005 and 2023, the White subgroup halved from 72.1 to 31.5 percent of the student body while the Asian subgroup quadrupled from 13.5 percent to a 50.6 percent majority. A school board trustee attributed a decline in interest in the district's Spanish dual immersion program with the increase in Asian students. As of the 2022–23 school year, the largest racial/ethnic group at Amador Valley was Asian, followed by White, then followed by Hispanic.

=== Awards ===
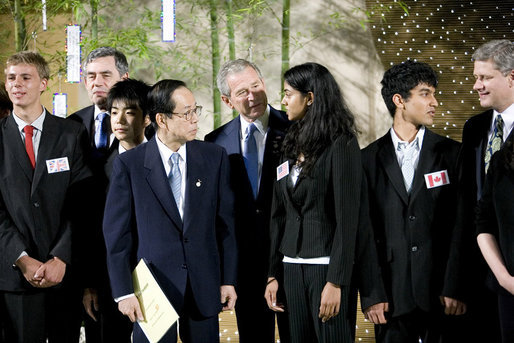
President George W. Bush and Japanese Prime Minister Yasuo Fukuda talk with an Amador Valley representative at the 2008 G8 Summit.

The school is a four-time California Distinguished School and a three-time National Blue Ribbon School. In 2008, a team of Amador Valley students won the national UNICEF-sponsored Junior 8 Competition. The team traveled to Toyako, Japan to attend the 2008 Group of Eight (G8) Summit of World Leaders to discuss global issues. The 2022 U.S. News & World Report high school rankings listed Amador Valley as #424 in its National Rankings and #56 in its California High School Rankings. Nine of Amador Valley's teachers have been recognized as a Pleasanton Unified School District teacher of the year; one of those honorees was designated an Alameda County teacher of the year.

=== Curriculum ===
The minimum graduation requirements for Amador Valley include four years of English; three and a half years of social sciences; two years each of math, science and physical education, and one semester of health. Students are also required to take one year of foreign language, visual and performing arts, or career and technical education. As of 2022, the largest teaching departments at the school were English language, social sciences, and mathematics, with 18–20 teaching staff each (on a FTE basis). As of 2023, 96.5 percent of the school's four-year adjusted cohort achieved the graduation standards, with 77.0 percent achieving the more stringent University of California and California State University requirements for entry.

As of 2021, the school's curriculum offered 24 Advanced Placement (AP) classes. This includes courses in the STEM fields (science, technology, engineering, mathematics), social sciences, visual and performing arts, and AP Language courses and their literature complements in English, French, Japanese, and Spanish. Amador Valley's AP program is participated in by 45.4 percent of its students, of which 94.3 percent receive at least one score of 3 or greater. The school's honors and AP classes are offered under an "open-access" policy; students are encouraged to take more advanced courses if they feel like they can handle it. As of 2019, the school's most enrolled AP classes were AP Psychology, AP United States Government and Politics, AP Macroeconomics, AP Statistics, and AP English Language and Composition.

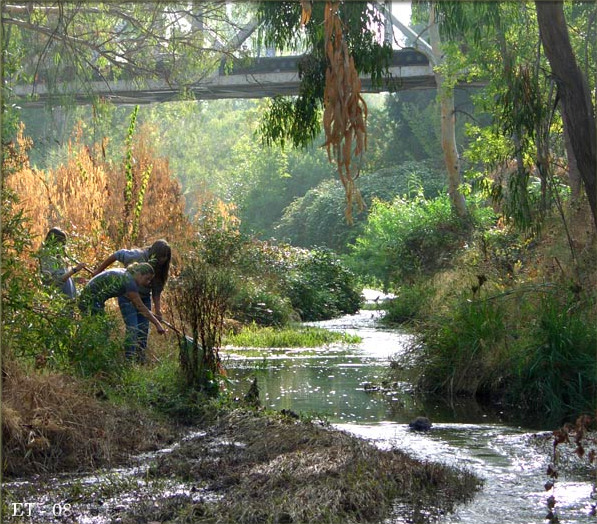
A group of Amador Valley students studying aquatic wildlife with Project Creek Watch at Arroyo Valle.

The school offers specialized instruction through vocational education as part of the Tri-Valley Regional Occupational Program. As of the 2021–22 school year, 28.6 percent of seniors participated in a vocational education program. Courses offered include automotive repair, business economics, criminal justice, digital art, marketing, sports medicine, AP Computer Science, and AP Environmental Science. Students in the business courses participate co-curricularly in DECA, competing in exams, project presentations, and case studies to prepare for careers in "marketing, finance, hospitality and management". Amador's DECA program was one of the "largest in the state" according to Pleasanton Weekly; as of 2015, over 100 Amador Valley students participated in the program. Over 50 Amador Valley teams and individuals have placed in the top 10 at DECA's International Career Development Conference (ICDC) since 2005. Business class students at Amador Valley have been selected as one of three California high schools to pitch Got Milk? advertising campaign ideas to the California Milk Processor Board.

The Amador Valley science department initiated Project Creek Watch in 1994. The project provides students with resources for the long term study of Arroyo Valle; these resources include information about the chemistry in the creek, images of the creek, a guide to flora and fauna, and student projects on aquatic species. The project received a Golden Bell Award for excellence in education from the California School Boards Association. A Project Creek Watch co-founder won a 2001 "Internet Innovator Award" from National Semiconductor for development of the website and associated curricula.

== Extracurricular activities ==
=== Athletics ===
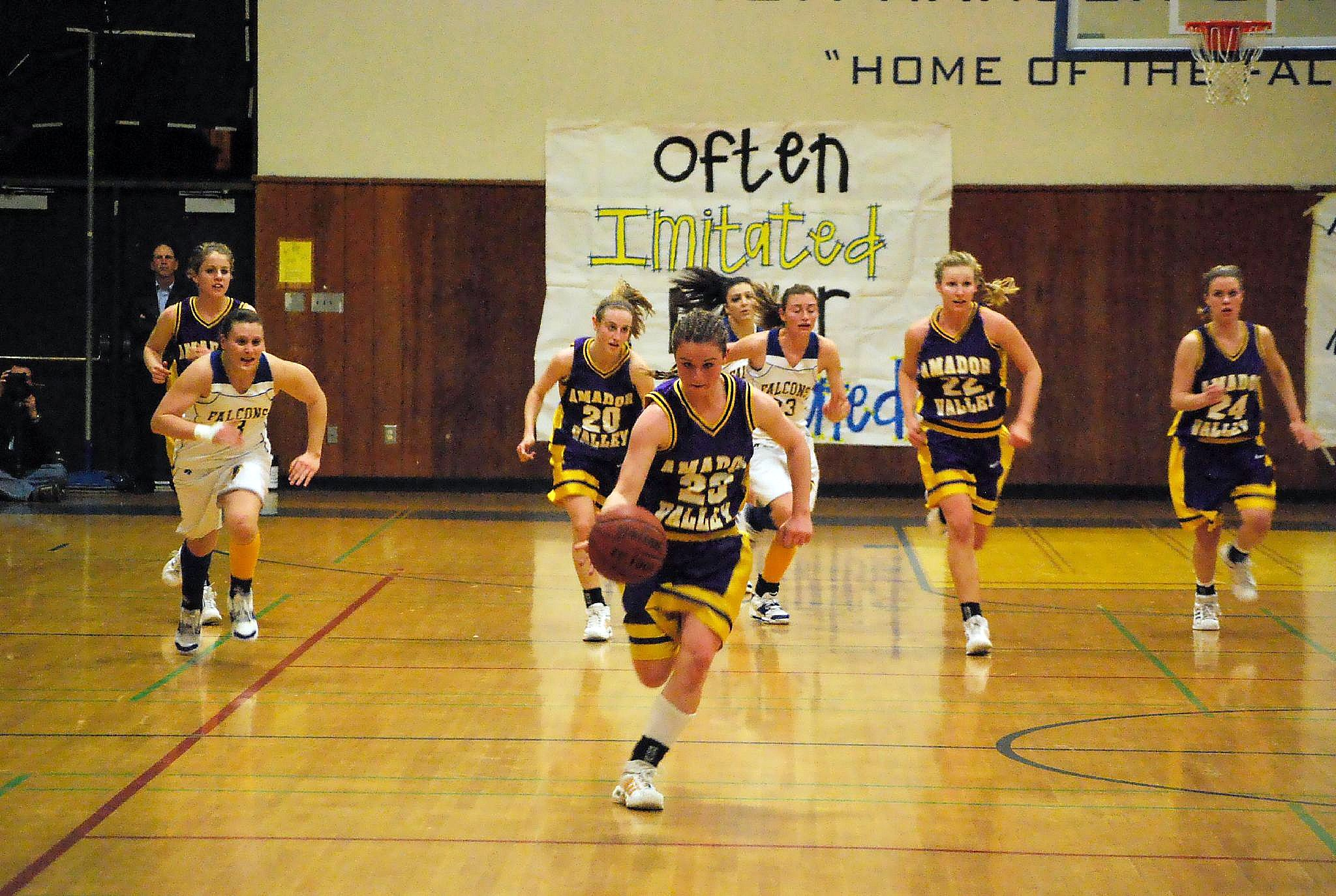
The Amador Valley varsity girls' basketball team faces rival team Foothill High School.

Amador Valley has offered athletic programs since 1932. As of 2022, the school offered 26 varsity sports teams. These sports are run under the Amador Valley Athletics Boosters and include badminton, baseball/softball, basketball, cross country/track, football, golf, lacrosse, soccer, cheer, swimming/diving, tennis, volleyball, water polo, and wrestling. Athletics at Amador Valley are funded by parental donations and the Athletics Boosters. The school district provides facilities and an athletic trainer for the sports programs at Amador and Foothill, but has provided no monetary support to athletics since 2008 due to statewide cuts in funding. The school's athletic rival is the cross-town Foothill High School. In the '70s and '80s, before the Amador/Foothill rivalry developed, the school's athletic rival was Dublin High School. The rivalry culminates at the annual football game.

As of 2017, over 1,000 students participated in the school's athletic program. Amador Valley competes in the East Bay Athletic League and California Interscholastic Federation (CIF) North Coast Section. Several school teams have won multiple North Coast Section Division I titles since 2010, including baseball/softball, cross country (girls), golf (girls), track (boys), and volleyball (boys). The school's basketball teams were runners-up for the CIF State Division II title in 1993 (boys) and 1999–2001 (girls). MaxPreps named the Amador Valley softball team its mythical national champion of 2014 following a 27–0 perfect season. The Amador Valley stunt cheer team have won multiple national championships within their divisions at United Spirit Association nationals cheer competitions.

The Amador Valley Athletic Booster Club has hosted East Bay Special Olympics "basketball tournaments, track meets, and volleyball competitions" at Amador Valley since 2004. The school coordinates parent and student volunteers, donates proceeds from snack sales, and provides facilities free of charge. The Amador Valley varsity boys' and girls' basketball teams host an annual eight-team basketball tournament, the Amador Basketball Classic (ABC), in the first two weeks of December. The ABC brings high school basketball teams from both inside and outside the state to play in Pleasanton. Each team plays four games between Wednesday and Saturday. Taking place every year since December 1961, the ABC is the longest-running eight-team basketball championship in California. The girls ABC tournament has been held since December 1994.

=== Civic engagement ===
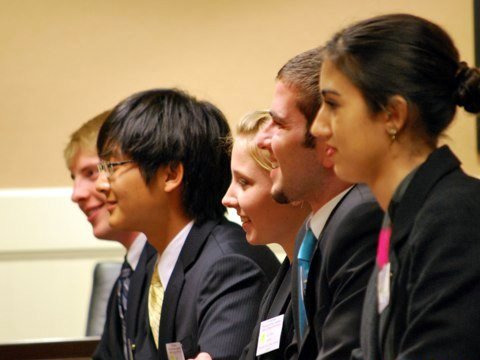
Students of Amador Valley "We the People" team testify in a simulated congressional hearing.

Amador Valley's main competitive civic engagement teams emphasize public speaking. The school participates in the Constitutional Rights Foundation's annual California Mock Trial competitions, fielding a prosecution and a defense team to "study a hypothetical case, conduct legal research, and learn about courtroom protocol and procedures". The school's Mock Trial team has won the Alameda County competition and advanced to the California Mock Trial Finals four times since 2007. Team members have received California Mock Trial Finals 1st place awards for Courtroom Artist and Courtroom Journalist.

The national We the People: The Citizen and the Constitution competition takes place each spring in Washington, D.C. At the competition, students compete to "demonstrate their constitutional knowledge and understanding of federal government in mock congressional hearings". The Amador Valley "We the People" team was started as an advanced civics class in 1989, shortly after the national program started in 1987. The team consists of up to 30 seniors selected by tryout, split into 6 units which each prepare a brief presentation followed by question-and-answer sessions.

The Amador Valley "We the People" team has represented the state of California at the national competition 20 times since 1992, earning the national title in 1995 and 2022. Multiple present and former members of the United States Congress have congratulated the team. The Judiciary of California, as part of its Civic Learning Initiative, awarded the Civic Learning Award of Merit to Amador Valley in 2014, in part because of the "We the People" program. The East Bay Times called Amador Valley's "We The People" team "one of the top programs in the country".

=== Math and computer science ===
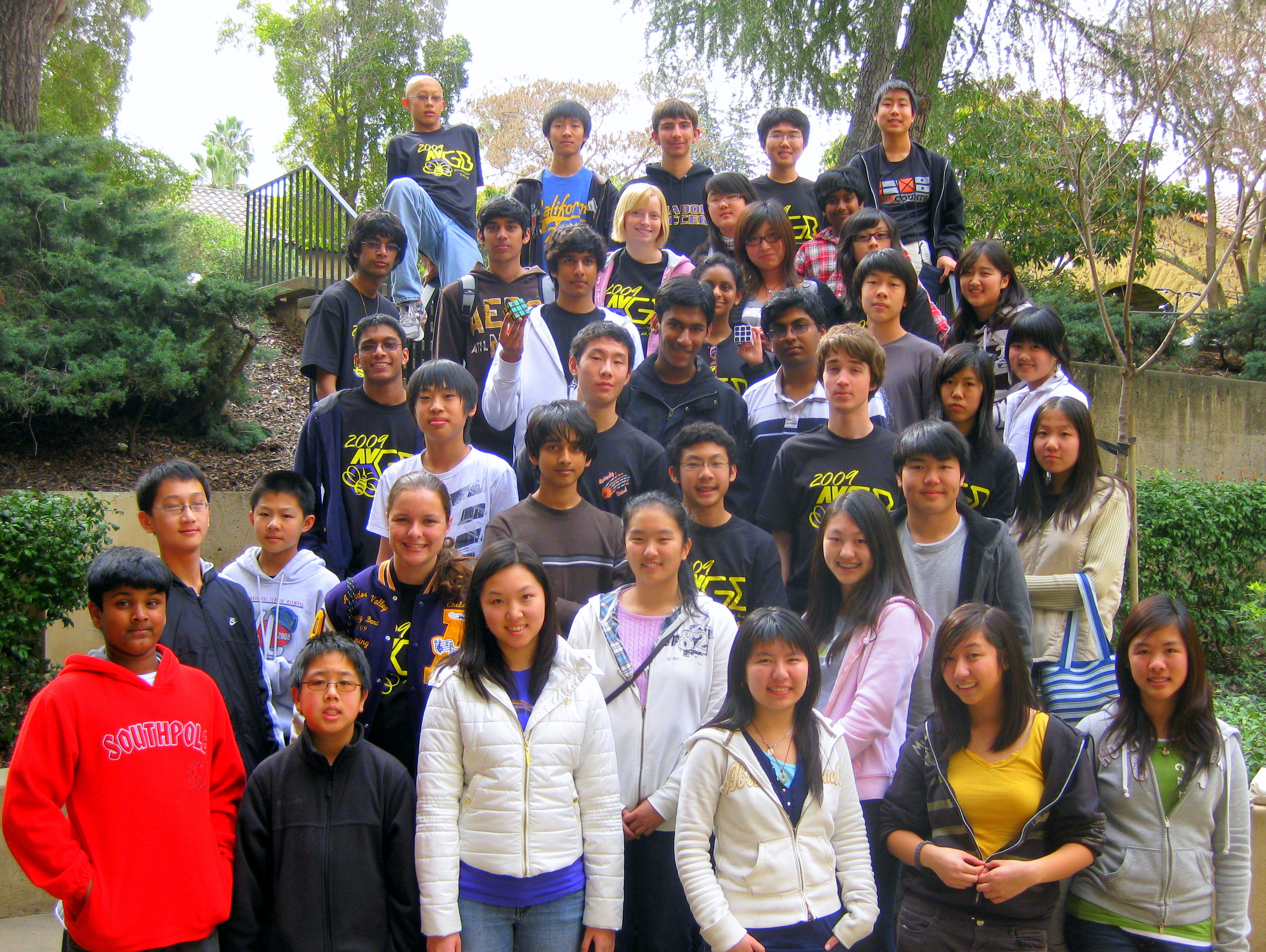
The Amador Valley Math Team, as part of the Pleasanton Math League, won third place at the 2013 Stanford Math Tournament.

Math and computer science clubs at Amador Valley host outreach events and participate in competitions. The Mathematical Association of America placed Amador Valley High School on its School Honor Roll in 2019 (one of 26 nationwide), 2020 (one of 15 nationwide), and 2021 (one of 33 nationwide) for performance on the American Mathematics Competitions 12A series; multiple Amador Valley students qualified for the United States of America Mathematical Olympiad in those same three years. The Math Team has ranked in the top 10 teams seven times in the nationwide Fall Startup Event since 2012, including a 2nd place finish in 2018. The group placed second at mathleague.org's northern California tournament in 2009, and received an invitation to mathleague.org's national tournament in Kansas City. The following year, the team placed second in the large school division at the national tournament.

The Math Team hosts the Amador Valley Geometry Bee, modeled after the Scripps National Spelling Bee. This competition invites students from Amador Valley, Foothill, and the district's three middle schools to compete in timed rounds. The style of the competition consists of rounds of ten questions each, deviating from the traditional spelling bee format.

Computer science clubs on campus, such as ACE Coding and Girls Who Code, host outreach events for local elementary, middle, and high school students. These events allowed students to attend coding workshops led by industry professionals and other students. The school received recognition from the AP Computer Science program and the California School Boards Association for efforts to engage young women in computer science. Multiple Amador Valley students have won the Congressional App Challenge for California's 15th congressional district for developing original, usable mobile apps.

=== Music ===
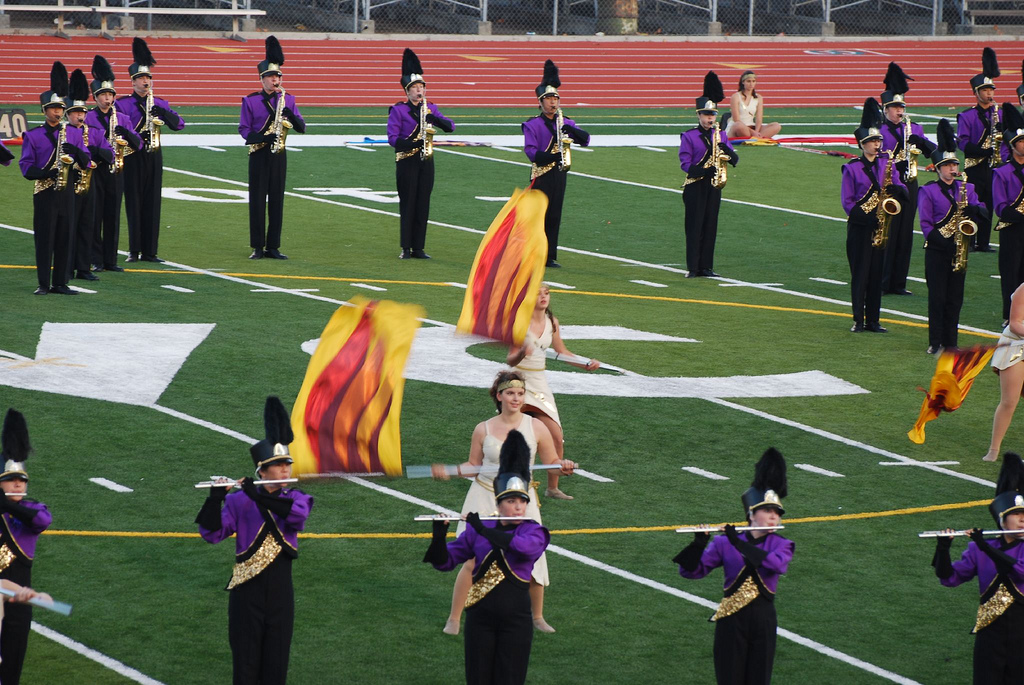
The marching band and color guard perform "Heroes, Gods, and Mythical Creatures" at the 2008 WBA Championships.

Amador Valley's music program, initially an orchestra and glee club, was founded in 1928. In the early years of the program, students performed in parades and numerous school operettas. Since 1975, the band has hosted the annual Campana Jazz Festival, a multi-day event that invites local jazz bands to the school to perform and compete. Since 1995, the Amador music program has hosted an annual musical production at the Amador Theatre, with performers from both Amador Valley and Foothill.

Amador Valley's music program consists of five concert bands, two orchestras, two choirs, and three jazz bands. The five concert bands are Wind Ensemble I, Wind Ensemble II, Symphonic Band Purple, Symphonic Band Gold, and Concert Band. As of 2017, the band program had 320 students. The Amador Valley Wind Ensemble has performed twice at the Midwest Clinic and once at Carnegie Hall. The symphony orchestra received positive attention from Hongkongers for a virtual performance of Glory to Hong Kong as part of a concert series on "songs of protest".

The marching band and color guard compete in the Western Band Association (WBA) circuit. The band practices a competitive field show, performed at football halftime shows and competitions. The Marching Dons are classified into WBA Class AAAAA. The Amador Valley Marching Dons have received sweepstakes and first place awards and earned fourth place in 2014 at the WBA Grand Championships. The band and colorguard have been invited multiple times to perform at the annual London New Year's Day Parade and Fiesta Bowl National Band Championship.

=== Robotics ===
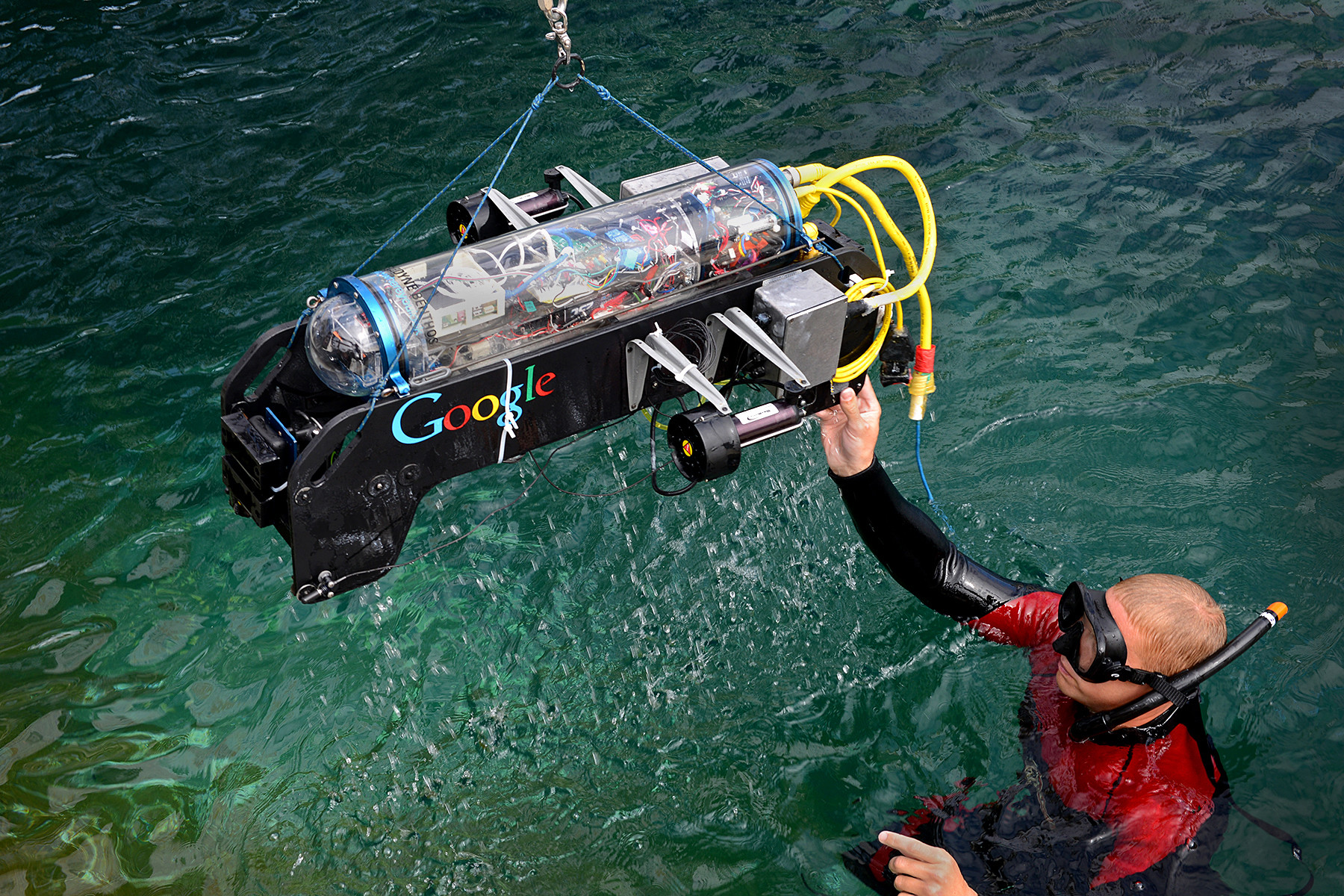
A United States Navy diver guides the Amador Valley AUV during the International RoboSub competition at the Naval Information Warfare Center Pacific in San Diego.

Amador Valley features at least two separate robotics teams, both competing in different international and collegiate-level autonomous vehicle competitions hosted by the Association for Unmanned Vehicle Systems International (AUVSI). The Amador Valley Unmanned Aerial Vehicle (UAV) team, founded in 2018, participates in the annual AUVSI Student Unmanned Aerial Systems (SUAS) Competition. The UAV team develops a drone to compete aerial missions, including autonomous flight, remote sensing, obstacle avoidance, robotic mapping, and air delivery. In 2022, the Amador Valley UAV team placed second among collegiate teams in its inaugural competition. The team's drone, Boreas, is a coaxial octocopter able to fly at a full speed of 48 mph (77 km/h) for up to 30 minutes.

Since 1997, the Office of Naval Research and RoboNation (previously the AUVSI Foundation) has sponsored an annual, international Autonomous Underwater Vehicle (AUV) competition called RoboSub. The Amador Valley AUV team, founded in 1999, participates annually in this competition. Amador's AUV team was the "first high school team at the competition", and each year develops an autonomous submarine that can maneuver an underwater obstacle course. In 2001 and 2022, the Amador Valley AUV team placed second among collegiate teams in the main competition.

== Notable alumni ==
Notable Amador Valley alumni include former National Football League players Nate Boyer, Mike Burke, Chris Geile, Rick Kane, Greg Kragen, Scott Peters, and Joe Terry. Other athletes that graduated from Amador include soccer player Jacob Akanyirige, soccer player Jason Annicchero, tennis player Matt Anger, soccer player Kevin Crow, soccer player Thomas Janjigian, golfer Joel Kribel, basketball player Kevin Laue, baseball player Stephen Piscotty, hockey player Matt Tennyson, and softball player Danielle Williams.

Several alumni are known as entertainers and actors, including filmmaker and actor Paul Korver, animator and illustrator Jay Howell, American-Canadian game show host Jim Perry, Broadway singer and actress Donna Theodore, and Mighty Morphin Power Rangers actor David Yost. Musicians who attended Amador Valley include punk musician Craig Billmeier, drummer Joe Plummer, and Jellyfish rock band duo Andy Sturmer and Roger Joseph Manning Jr. Other notable alumni include United States Air Force commander Cary C. Chun, computer scientist Chelsea Finn, health advocate for ethnic minorities Janet Liang, journalist and community activist Abby Martin, Alameda County district attorney Tom Orloff, novelist Francine Rivers, and shooting victim Kate Steinle.
