= Eric Moran =

American football player (born 1960)

No. 72, 76
- Positions: Tackle, guard

Personal information
- Born: June 10, 1960; Spokane, Washington, U.S.
- Listed height: 6 ft 5 in (1.96 m)
- Listed weight: 285 lb (129 kg)

Career information
- High school: Foothill (Pleasanton, California)
- College: Washington
- NFL draft: 1983: 10th round, 273rd overall pick

Career history
- Los Angeles Express (1983); Dallas Cowboys (1984)*; Houston Oilers (1984–1986)
- * Offseason or practice squad member only

Awards and highlights
- Third-team All-American (1982); Second-team All-Pac-10 (1982)

Career NFL statistics
- Games played: 37
- Games started: 8
- Stats at Pro Football Reference

Eric Michael Moran (born June 10, 1960) was an American former professional football player who was an offensive tackle for the Houston Oilers of the National Football League (NFL). He also was a member of the Los Angeles Express in the United States Football League (USFL). He played college football for the Washington Huskies.

== Early life ==
Moran attended Foothill High School in Pleasanton, California, where he played defensive tackle. He accepted a football scholarship from the University of Washington, where he was converted into an offensive tackle.

As a junior, he was named the starter at right tackle. As a senior, he received second-team All-Pac-10 and All-Pacific Coast honors, and was also selected as a third-team All-American by Gannett News Service.

== Professional career ==
=== Los Angeles Express ===
Moran was selected by the Dallas Cowboys in the 10th round (273rd overall) of the 1983 NFL draft. He was also selected by the Oakland Invaders in the 16th round (186th overall) of the 1983 USFL draft. He was traded to the Los Angeles Express of the United States Football League. He was waived on February 16, 1984.

=== Dallas Cowboys ===
In 1984, he signed with the Dallas Cowboys. He was tried both at offensive guard and offensive tackle. He was waived on August 27.

=== Houston Oilers ===
In 1984, he was signed as a free agent by the Houston Oilers. As a rookie, he appeared in 8 games and started one contest at offensive tackle, in place of an injured Dean Steinkuhler. In 1985, he appeared in 15 games (3 starts). In 1986, he appeared in 14 games (4 starts). He wasn't re-signed after the season.

== Personal life ==
His father Jim Moran and his brother Rich Moran played in the NFL.
