= Lassonde v. Pleasanton Unified School District =

Nicholas Lassonde
- Court: United States Court of Appeals, Ninth Circuit
- Full case name: Lassonde v. Pleasanton Unified School District
- Argued: 2003-01-17 2003
- Citation: 320 F.3d 979

Holding
- There is no room in Cole for a public school to disclaim sectarian, proselytizing religious speech at a graduation ceremony.

Laws applied
- Establishment Clause, California Constitution

Lassonde v. Pleasanton Unified School District is a case about First Amendment freedoms and the separation between church and state. A student of Amador Valley High School claimed a violation of his first amendment right of speech when parts of his salutatorian speech were censored. The case went up to the US Court of Appeals. This case is an important case in educational law concerning religious expression on school campuses.

== Factual and Procedural History ==
Because of his grade-point average of 4.24, Nicholas Lassonde, the Plaintiff, was one of two co-salutatorians of the Amador Valley High School class of 1999. He was consequently invited to deliver a speech at the school's graduation ceremony. Lassonde, who is a devout Christian, drafted a speech that quoted extensively from the Bible. In his declaration, he explained that he intended it to "express[][his] desire for [his] fellow graduates to develop a personal relationship with God through faith in Christ in order to better their lives."

The Principal of the high school, Coupe, who oversaw the graduation ceremony, asked Lassonde to submit a draft of his speech; Coupe reviewed the draft and, in conjunction with the school district's counsel, determined that allowing a student to deliver overtly proselytizing comments at a public high school's graduation ceremony would violate the Establishment Clauses of both the United States and the California Constitutions. Accordingly, Coupe and the district's counsel advised Lassonde that references to God as they related to his own beliefs were permissible, but that proselytizing comments were not.

The three portions of his speech that the school told him to remove were:

I urge you to seek out the Lord, and let Him guide you. Through His power, you can stand tall in the face of darkness, and survive the trends of "modern society."

As Psalm 146 says, "Do not put your trust in princes, in mortal men, who cannot even save themselves. When their spirit departs, they return to the ground; on that very day their plans come to nothing. Blessed is he whose help is the God of Jacob, whose hope is in the Lord his God, the Maker of heaven and earth, the sea, and everything in them — the Lord, who remains faithful forever. He upholds the cause of the oppressed and gives food to the hungry. The Lord sets prisoners free, the Lord gives sight to the blind, the Lord lifts up those who are bowed down, the Lord loves the righteous. The Lord watches over the alien and sustains the fatherless and the widow, but he frustrates the ways of the wicked."

"For the wages of sin is death; but the gift of God is eternal life through Jesus Christ our Lord." Have you accepted the gift, or will you pay the ultimate price?

Although the school demanded that Lassonde excise these portions, they allowed him to retain several personal references to his religion. For example, his speech began with a dedication to the memory of his grandfather, who had planned to attend the graduation but who, just that past week, had gone "home to be with the Lord." His speech closed with the words, "Good Luck and God Bless!"

Before Lassonde agreed to excise the proselytizing portions of the graduation speech, the parties engaged in discussions to determine what Lassonde would and would not be allowed to say. His counsel suggested that the school district provide a "disclaimer" that would state that the views of the student speakers did not represent the views of the school district. This suggestion was rejected. The parties eventually reached a compromise. Under protest, Lassonde agreed that he would deliver his speech without the proselytizing passages and would hand out copies of the full text of his proposed draft speech just outside the site where the graduation ceremony would be held.

On June 18, 1999, the School held its graduation ceremony, at the Alameda County Fairgrounds, financed and insured entirely by the school district and conducted entirely under its direction. Lassonde delivered his speech and distributed handouts as agreed. When he reached the portions that had been excised, he said that portions had been censored, and told the audience that he would distribute the uncensored speech outside the graduation ceremony and give the full speech on Sunday at his church.

Nearly one year later, Lassonde filed this action seeking damages from the school district; Mary Frances Callan, the school district's superintendent; Jim Negri, assistant superintendent; and Bill Coupe, the principal. He asserted seven claims: violation of his federal constitutional rights to free speech, religious liberty, and equal protection; violation of his state constitutional rights to free speech, religious liberty, and equal protection; and violation of a state education statute. Defendants answered that their actions were protected by qualified immunity.

After dismissing claims against the school district and the school officials in their individual capacities under the Eleventh Amendment, the district court granted summary judgment in favor of the remaining Defendants in their official capacities. Relying on the decision in Cole v. Oroville Union High School District the district court concluded that their actions were necessary to avoid violating the Establishment Clause. The court rejected Plaintiff's equal protection argument and declined to exercise supplemental jurisdiction over his state-law claim.

Plaintiff filed a notice of appeal, limited to the question whether, under the first step of the qualified immunity analysis required by Saucier v. Katz that he has alleged facts amounting to a federal constitutional violation—specifically, whether the restriction on his speech violated the First Amendment and whether the school's rejection of his suggested disclaimer as a "less restrictive" alternative to censoring his speech violated the First Amendment.
