= Janet Liang =

American health advocate and activist

- 梁嘉欣
- Born: Janet Liang; January 6, 1987; Honolulu, Hawaii, U.S.
- Died: September 12, 2012 (aged 25); Houston, Texas, U.S.
- Cause of death: Complications from acute lymphoblastic leukemia
- Resting place: San Mateo, California
- Education: Amador Valley High School; University of California, Los Angeles (B.A.)
- Occupation: Health advocate
- Organization: Helping Janet
- Parent(s): Guy Y. Liang; Teresa Wei S. Liang
- Website: www.janetgliang.com

Janet Liang (Chinese: 梁嘉欣; pinyin: Liáng Jiāxīn; January 6, 1987 – September 12, 2012) was a prominent health advocate and activist who advocated for ethnic minorities (especially Asian Americans) in the United States to join the national marrow registry, the National Marrow Donor Program. In 2011, she was selected as one of Asian Pacific Americans for Progress's Unsung Heroes. In 2012, Liang won the City of Pleasanton's 2012 Juanita Haugen Community of Character Awards.

== Early life and education ==
Liang was born on January 6, 1987, at Kapiolani Medical Center for Women and Children in Honolulu, Hawaii, to Guy and Teresa Liang, Chinese American immigrants from Guangdong, China.

Liang graduated from Amador Valley High School in 2005. She went on to study at University of California, Los Angeles, where she graduated with a Bachelor of Arts degree in international development studies and a minor in education in Spring 2009. Throughout her college career, Liang participated in undergraduate organizations that included Project Working for Immigrant Literacy Development, which works with socioeconomically disadvantaged immigrant students, and Net Impact Undergrad at UCLA, which focuses on socially conscious businesses.

== Helping Janet ==
On 24 August 2009, during her fourth year at UCLA, Liang was diagnosed with acute lymphoblastic leukemia at the Ronald Reagan UCLA Medical Center. That year, she founded Helping Janet, a grassroots initiative aimed at mobilizing ethnic minority communities to register their marrow in 2009, with the help of her friends. Helping Janet became a global movement, reaching out to Asians across the United States and the Chinese-speaking regions of China, Taiwan, Hong Kong and Singapore, by utilizing social media.

The organization has since registered over 20,000 new donors and found 18 matches for blood cancer patients.

On January 21, 2012, while at the hospital, Liang uploaded a video plea on YouTube asking Americans, particularly those of Chinese descent, to register for the marrow registry. In the plea, Liang said:

I'm so afraid of dying. It feels like I don't have much time left. And I realize that I’m afraid I’m dying because mostly I’m afraid of what I’m leaving behind.

The plea became a viral video after a posting on Reddit and has garnered some 380,000 views. This video also garnered the attention and advocacy of Asian American internet celebrities and musicians including Far East Movement, Wong Fu Productions, Kevjumba and the cast of White Frog, including Harry Shum Jr., Booboo Stewart, BD Wong, Joan Chen and Amy Hill.

On February 5, 2012, as part of the Governor of Guam's weekly address, Eddie Calvo publicly asked Guamanians to register in the marrow registry:

Today, Joey Tyquiengco and Janet Liang need your help. You see, they’ve been diagnosed with leukemia and their chances of fighting will be even greater with your support. In a few days, the medical community will be holding a bone marrow drive to help Joey and Janet.

== Death ==
In June 2010, she went into remission after a battery of chemotherapy treatments. One and a half years later, Liang relapsed in December 2011 and began treatment at the UCSF Medical Center and participated in a clinical trial at the MD Anderson Cancer Center in Houston, Texas.

In June 2012, Liang found a 9/10 marrow match from a 29-year-old male. She received a marrow transplant on 5 September 2012 at the University of Texas MD Anderson Cancer Center. Liang died on September 12, 2012, six days after receiving a marrow transplant, owing to complications from chemotherapy.
