= Batting Stance Guy =

American sports entertainer

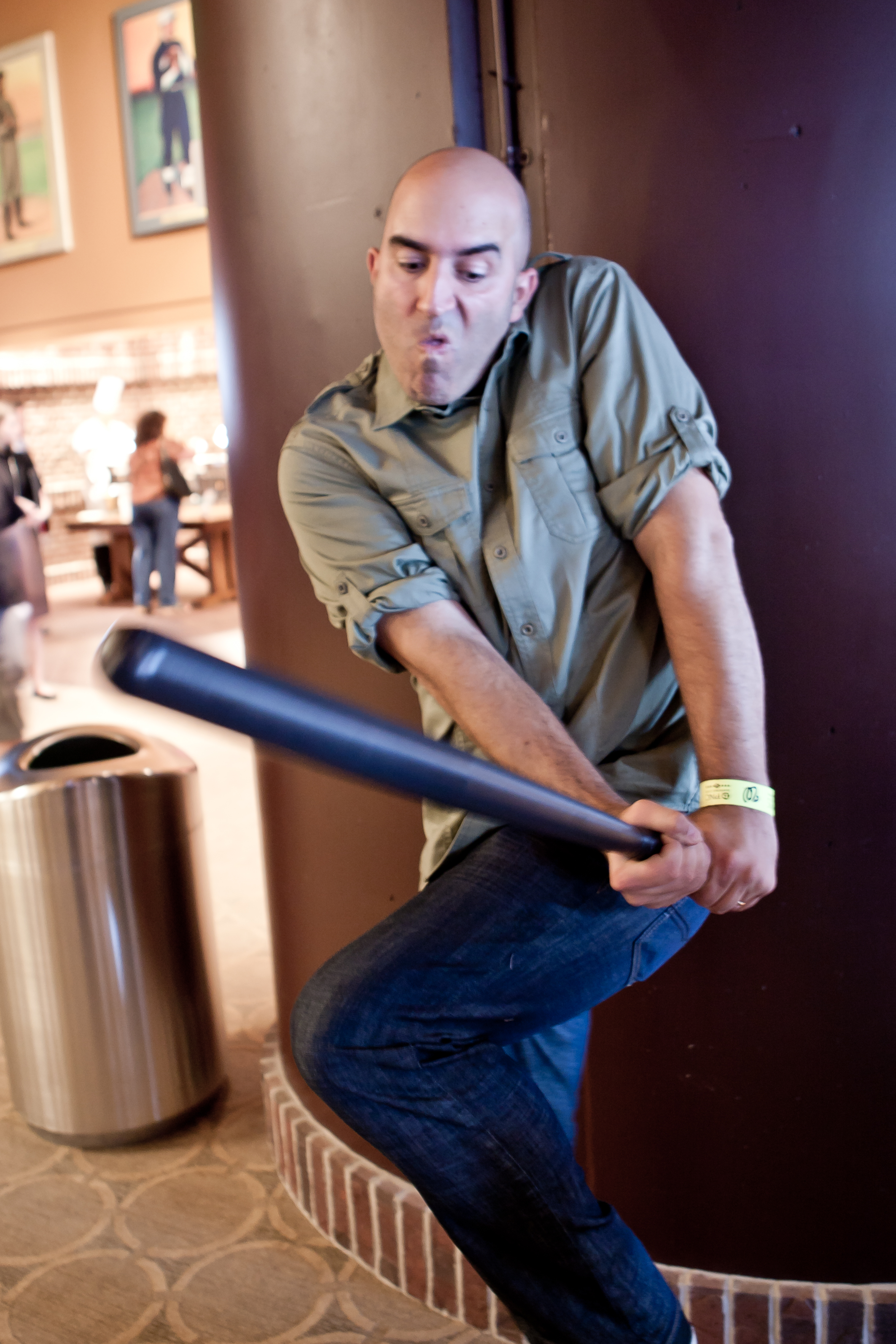
Ryness demonstrating Michael Morse's batting stance in 2011.

Gar Ryness, also known by his stage name Batting Stance Guy, is an American sports entertainer and YouTube personality. Ryness mimics the batting stances of Major League Baseball players, both active and retired.

Ryness, a baseball fan, began practicing his talent at seven years old while playing wiffle ball in his backyard. Ryness claims that he only has to watch a hitter a few times before he can imitate their stance. He picks up on the intricacies of each stance and exaggerates them so that people notice and recognize them. Despite having what Ryness jokingly refers to as the "least marketable skill in the United States," he said he loves traveling around the country and bringing nostalgia to the fans and players.

== Personal life ==
Ryness grew up in the San Francisco Bay Area and graduated from Monte Vista High School in Danville in 1991. He is a graduate of Syracuse University.

Before landing a deal with Fox Sports Net, he worked for a nonprofit Christian organization as a spiritual advisor to professionals in the entertainment industry. He has since made a career in the finance and pharmaceutical industries.

He is married with two children.

== TV appearances and radio broadcasts ==
- May 23, 2008: First blog mention on BallHype.com: Q&A with the Batting Stance Guy
- May 2008: Dan Patrick mentions BSG and his "unmarketable" skill on his Sirius XM radio show
- June 2008: Bill Simmons of ESPN.com gives BSG the honor of "YouTube Star of the Week"
- August 2008: Brewers Live (FSN North WI): BSG on Brewers Live
- August 2008: Twins Live (FSN North MN): BSG on Twins Live
- September 10, 2008: Padres Pregame Show (Cox Media SD): BSG on Padres Pregame show
- September 2008: Angels Live (FSN West): BSG on Angels Live
- September 2008: Dodgers Live (FSN Prime Ticket): BSG on Dodgers Live
- November 2008: Sony Entertainment records his stance imitations for MLB 2009: The Show
- April 15, 2009: ESPN's E:60: "Art of the Stance"
- May 6, 2009: The Associated Press: "BSG and Manny Ramirez"
- May 19, 2009: The Associated Press: "Rise of the BSG"
- June 17, 2009: ESPN's Baseball Tonight BSG on Baseball tonight
- July 13, 2009: CBS's Late Show with David Letterman

== Books and publications ==
On April 30, 2010, Ryness, in collaboration with Caleb Dewart, released the book Batting Stance Guy: A Love Letter to Baseball. The book was published by Scribner.
