= We the People: The Citizen and the Constitution =

U.S. high school civics competition

We the People: The Citizen and the Constitution National Finals, sponsored by the Center for Civic Education, is a yearly competition involving high school students from throughout the United States. The national finals simulates a congressional hearing and is held at the National Conference Center in Leesburg, Virginia, and in congressional hearing rooms on Capitol Hill. Each class is divided into six units, each composed of three to six students. Each unit focuses on a particular area of Constitutional interest - from the philosophical underpinnings and Constitutional Convention to the Bill of Rights and modern day implications. Students are judged on criteria such as their understanding, reasoning, responsiveness, and use of constitutional applications.

In preparation for the national finals, classes learn about government and study the Constitution and Bill of Rights. In each class the six unit groups prepare four-minute opening statements in response to three congressional hearing questions. Afterwards, judges ask students follow-up questions to test the depth of their knowledge on the topic in a six-minute question and answer period. During the national finals over 1,200 students from 56 classes testify before a total of 72 judges, in panels of three. The judges are history, political science, law, and education professors, members of the legal community, and others with a knowledge of the Constitution and Bill of Rights.

To qualify for the national finals, a class must win its state championship or qualify as a "wild card" class. The national finals takes place over three days, with the top twelve classes from the first two days advancing to the final round of competition in hearing rooms on Capitol Hill. At the national finals, each unit testifies on two hearing questions during the first two days of competition. The classes with the twelve highest combined scores advance to the final round on the third day. The top twelve places are determined by combining the scores from the first two days and a weighted final round score. Each year nearly $2,000,000 is raised in communities throughout the United States to support the national finals.

According to the Center for Civic Education, "Since the inception of the We the People program in 1987, more than 28 million students and 90 thousand educators have participated in the program and more than 30,000 students have participated in the national finals." The James Madison Legacy Project published reports finding significant gains in civic education outcomes for students and teachers engaged in the We The People Program.

== 2025 Results ==
Sources:

- 1st Place: Lincoln High School & Sprague High School
- 2nd Place: Denver East High School & Fishers High School
- 5th Place: Reno High School
- 6th Place: Douglas S. Freeman High School
- 7th Place: Maggie L. Walker Governor's School for Government and International Studies
- 8th Place: Staples High School
- 9th Place: Arcadia High School
- 10th Place: Corona del Sol High School

== 2024 Results ==
National Winners

1st Place: Oregon - Grant High School - Portland Oregon

2nd Place: Virginia - Douglas S. Freeman High School - Henrico

3rd Place: California - Foothill High School - Pleasanton

4th Place: Colorado - Denver East High School - Denver

5th Place: Washington - Tahoma High School - Maple Valley

6th Place: Oregon - Lincoln High School - Portland

7th Place: California - Amador Valley High School - Pleasanton

8th Place: Nevada - Reno High School - Reno

9th Place: Virginia - Glen Allen High School - Glen Allen

10th Place: Massachusetts - Easthampton High School - Easthampton

== 2023 results ==
The 2023 national competition was held in person for the first time since 2019

National Winners

1st Place: Virginia - Maggie L. Walker Governor's School for Government and International Studies - Richmond

2nd Place: Oregon - Grant High School - Portland

3rd Place: California - Foothill High School - Pleasanton

Honorable Mentions

4th Place: Colorado - Denver East High School - Denver

5th Place: Wisconsin - Wauwatosa West High School - Wauwatosa

6th Place: Oregon (Wild Card) - Lincoln High School - Portland

7th Place: Washington - Tahoma High School - Maple Valley

8th Place: Connecticut - Trumbull High School - Trumbull

9th Place: California (Wild Card) - Amador Valley High School - Pleasanton

10th Place: Arizona - Mountain View High School - Mesa

Division Winners

Division A: Indiana - Fishers High School - Fishers

Division B: Virginia (Wild Card) - Douglas S. Freeman High School - Henrico

Division C: Nevada (Wild Card) - Reno High School - Reno

Division D: Nevada - Edward C. Reed High School - Sparks

Unit Awards

Unit 1: Connecticut (Wild Card) - Staples High School - Wesport

Unit 2: Michigan - East Kentwood High School - Kentwood

Unit 3: Massachusetts - Easthampton High School - Easthampton

Unit 4: North Carolina - Raleigh Charter High School - Raleigh

Unit 5: Kentucky - Highlands High School - Fort Thomas

Unit 6: Arizona (Wild Card) - Hamilton High School - Chandler

== 2022 results ==
The 2022 national competition was held virtually due to the COVID-19 pandemic.

National Winners

1st Place: California - Amador Valley High School - Pleasanton

2nd Place: Indiana - Fishers High School - Fishers

3rd Place: Virginia (Wild Card) - Douglas S Freeman High School - Henrico

Honorable Mentions

4th Place: California (Wild Card) - Foothill High School - Pleasanton

5th Place: Virginia - Maggie L. Walker Governor's School for Government and International Studies - Richmond

6th Place: Oregon - Grant High School - Portland

7th Place: Colorado - Denver East High School - Denver

8th Place: Washington - Tahoma High School - Maple Valley

9th Place: Wisconsin - Wauwatosa West High School - Wauwatosa

10th Place: Connecticut - Trumbull High School - Trumbull

11th Place: Massachusetts - Easthampton High School - Easthampton

12th Place: Nevada - Reno High School - Reno

Division Winners

Division A: Illinois - Maine South High School - Park Ridge

Division B: Alabama - Vestavia Hills High School - Vestavia Hills

Division C: Oregon (Wild Card) - Central Catholic High School - Portland

Division D: Wyoming - Sheridan High School - Sheridan

Unit Awards

Unit 1: Michigan - East Grand Rapids High School - Grand Rapids

Unit 2: Wisconsin (Wild Card) - Wauwatosa East High School - Wauwatosa

Unit 3: New Hampshire - Milford High School - Milford

Unit 4: Nevada (Wild Card) - West Career and Technical Academy - Las Vegas

Unit 5: New Jersey - East Brunswick High School - East Brunswick

Unit 6: Utah - Green Canyon High School & Sky View High School - North Logan & Smithfield

== 2021 results ==
The 2021 national competition was held virtually due to the COVID-19 pandemic.

National Winners

1st Place: Virginia - Maggie L. Walker Governor's School for Government and International Studies - Richmond

2nd Place: Oregon - Grant High School - Portland

3rd Place: Nevada - Reno High School - Reno

Honorable Mentions

4th Place: Wisconsin - Wauwatosa West High School - Wauwatosa

5th Place: Arizona - Mountain View High School - Mesa

6th Place: California (Wild Card) - Foothill High School - Pleasanton

7th Place: California - Irvington High School - Fremont

8th Place: Nevada (Wild Card) - Incline High School - Incline Village

9th Place: Connecticut (Wild Card) - Trumbull High School - Trumbull

10th Place: Washington - Tahoma High School - Maple Valley

11th Place: Indiana - Hamilton Southeastern High School - Fishers

12th Place: Arizona (Wild Card) - Hamilton High School - Chandler

Division Winners

Division A: Massachusetts - Easthampton High School - Easthampton

Division B: Michigan - East Grand Rapids High School - Grand Rapids

Division C: Wisconsin (Wild Card) - Wauwatosa East High School - Wauwatosa

Division D: Colorado - Denver East High School - Denver

Unit Awards

Unit 1: New Jersey - East Brunswick High School - East Brunswick

Unit 2: Nebraska - Lincoln East High School - Lincoln

Unit 3: Oregon (Wild Card) - Cleveland High School - Portland

Unit 4: Connecticut - Staples High School - Westport

Unit 5: Alabama - Vestavia Hills High School - Vestavia Hills

Unit 6: North Carolina - Raleigh Charter High School - Raleigh

== 2020 results ==
The 2020 national competition was held virtually due to the COVID-19 pandemic.

National Winners

1st Place: Massachusetts - Easthampton High School - Easthampton

2nd Place: Oregon - Lincoln High School - Portland

3rd Place: Virginia - Maggie L. Walker Governor's School for Government and International Studies - Richmond

Division Winners

Best team that did not place in the top 3, from each of 4 regions

Division A: Alabama - Vestavia Hills High School - Vestavia Hills

Division B: California - Amador Valley High School - Pleasanton

Division C: Connecticut - Staples High School - Westport

Division D: Nevada - Reno High School - Reno

Unit Awards

Highest unit scores from schools that were not national winners nor division winners.

Unit 1: Washington - Tahoma High School - Maple Valley

Unit 2: New Jersey - East Brunswick High School - East Brunswick

Unit 3: Nevada (Wild Card) - Incline High School

Unit 4: Oregon (Wild Card) - Grant High School - Portland

Unit 5: Illinois - Maine South High School - Park Ridge

Unit 6: Montana - Laurel High School - Laurel

== 2019 results ==
National Winners

1st Place: Colorado - Denver East High School - Denver

2nd Place: California - Amador Valley High School - Pleasanton

3rd Place: Oregon (Wild Card) - Grant High School - Portland

Honorable Mentions

4th Place: Oregon - Lincoln High School - Portland

5th Place: Virginia - Maggie L. Walker Governor's School for Government and International Studies - Richmond

6th Place: Virginia (Wild Card) - Douglas S Freeman High School - Henrico

7th Place: Indiana - Hamilton Southeastern High School - Fishers

8th Place: Indiana (Wild Card) - Fishers High School - Fishers

9th Place: Washington - Tahoma High School - Maple Valley

10th Place: Michigan (Wild card) - Black River Public School - Holland

Unit Awards

Highest unit scores from schools that were not national winners nor division winners.

Unit 1: Utah - Sky View High School/Green Canyon High School - Smithfield

Unit 2: Massachusetts - Easthampton High School - Easthampton

Unit 3: Illinois - Maine South High School - Park Ridge

Unit 4: Nevada (Wild Card) - Incline High School - Incline Village

Unit 5: Wisconsin (Wild Card) - Wauwatosa East High School - Wauwatosa

Unit 6: Arizona - Mountain View High School - Mesa

== 2018 results ==
National Winners

1st Place: Oregon - Grant High School - Portland

2nd Place: California (Wild Card) - Foothill High School - Pleasanton

3rd Place: Oregon (Wild Card) - Lincoln High School - Portland

Honorable Mentions

4th Place: California - Amador Valley High School - Pleasanton

5th Place: Virginia - Maggie L. Walker Governor's School for Government and International Studies - Richmond

6th Place: Colorado - Denver East High School - Denver

7th Place: Washington - Tahoma High School - Maple Valley

8th Place: Indiana - Fishers High School - Fishers

9th Place: Illinois - Maine South High School - Park Ridge

10th Place: Wisconsin - Wauwatosa West High School - Wauwatosa

== 2017 results ==
National Winners

1st Place: Virginia - Maggie L. Walker Governor's School for Government and International Studies - Richmond
2nd Place: Oregon - Grant High School - Portland
3rd Place: Indiana - Cathedral High School - Indianapolis

Honorable Mentions

4th Place: Indiana (Wild Card) - Plainfield High School - Plainfield
5th Place: California - Amador Valley High School - Pleasanton
6th Place: Virginia (Wild Card) - Douglas S. Freeman High School - Henrico
7th Place: Colorado - Denver East High School - Denver
8th Place: Alabama - Vestavia Hills High School - Vestavia Hills
9th Place: Michigan - East Grand Rapids High School - East Grand Rapids
10th Place: Illinois - Maine South High School - Park Ridge

== 2016 results ==
National Winners

1st Place: Oregon - Lincoln High School - Portland
2nd Place: Colorado - Denver East High School - Denver
3rd Place: Oregon (Wild Card) - Grant High School - Portland

Honorable Mentions

4th Place: Alabama - Vestavia Hills High School- Vestavia Hills
5th Place: Virginia - Maggie L. Walker Governor's School for Government and International Studies - Richmond
6th Place: Indiana - Fishers High School - Fishers
7th Place: California - Arcadia High School - Arcadia
8th Place: Connecticut - Trumbull High School - Trumbull
9th Place: Washington - Tahoma Senior High School - Covington
10th Place: New Jersey - East Brunswick High School - East Brunswick

== 2015 results ==
National Winners

1st Place: Oregon - Grant High School - Portland
2nd Place: Virginia - Maggie L. Walker Governor's School - Richmond
3rd Place: Virginia (Wild Card) - Douglas S Freeman High School - Henrico

Honorable Mentions

4th Place: Washington - Tahoma Senior High School- Covington
5th Place: Alabama - Vestavia Hills High School- Vestavia Hills
6th Place: California - Amador Valley High School - Pleasanton
7th Place: Nevada - Edward C. Reed High School- Sparks
8th Place: Michigan - East Grand Rapids High School - Grand Rapids
9th Place: New Jersey - East Brunswick High School - East Brunswick
10th Place: Indiana - Munster High School - Munster

Unit Awards

Unit 2: Wisconsin- Wauwatosa West High School- Wauwatosa
Unit 4: California- Arcadia High School- Arcadia
Unit 5: Arizona - Corona del Sol High School - Tempe

== 2014 results ==
National Winners

1st Place: Oregon -Lincoln High School - Portland
2nd Place: California - Amador Valley High School - Pleasanton
3rd Place: Virginia - Maggie L. Walker Governor's School - Richmond

Honorable Mentions

4th Place: Indiana- Fishers High School- Fishers
5th Place: Alabama- Vestavia Hills High School- Vestavia Hills
6th Place: Michigan- East Grand Rapids High School- Grand Rapids
7th Place: Colorado- Grandview High School- Aurora
8th Place: Illinois- Maine South High School- Park Ridge
9th Place: Arizona- Corona del Sol- Tempe
10th Place: New Mexico- Highland High School- Albuquerque

Unit Awards

Unit 2: Wisconsin- Wauwatosa West High School- Wauwatosa Unit 3: New Jersey- East Brunswick High School- East Brunswick

== 2013 results ==
National Winners

1st Place: Oregon-Grant High School-Portland
2nd Place: California- Amador Valley High School-Pleasanton
3rd Place: Colorado-Denver East High School-Denver

Honorable Mentions

4th Place: Alabama- Vestavia Hills High School- Vestavia Hills
5th Place: Indiana- Cathedral High School- Indianapolis
6th Place: Arizona- Corona del Sol High School- Tempe
7th Place: Washington- Tahoma Senior High School- Covington
8th Place: Connecticut- Trumbull High School- Trumbull
9th Place: Illinois- Maine South High School- Park Ridge
10th Place: Indiana (Wild Card)- Plainfield High School- Plainfield

== 2012 results ==
National Winners

1st Place: Oregon-Lincoln High School-Portland
2nd Place: Virginia - Maggie L. Walker Governor's School
3rd Place: California - Arcadia High School-Arcadia

4th Place: New Jersey - East Brunswick High School
5th Place: Indiana - Munster High School
9th Place: North Carolina - Northwest Guilford High School
10th Place: Illinois - Maine South High School

== 2011 results ==
National Winners
1st Place: Virginia Maggie L. Walker Governor's School
2nd Place: California Amador Valley High School
3rd Place: New Jersey East Brunswick High School

Honorable Mention
(top ten)
4th Place: Alabama Vestavia Hills High School
5th Place: Michigan East Grand Rapids High School
6th Place: Colorado
7th Place: Oregon
8th Place: North Carolina
9th Place: Illinois
10th Place: Indiana Munster High School

Unit Awards
Best non-finalist team for expertise in each unit of competition
Unit 1: Missouri
Unit 2: Rhode Island
Unit 3: South Dakota
Unit 4: New York
Unit 5: Washington
Unit 6: Kansas

Regional Awards
Best non-finalist team from each region
Western States: Alaska
Mountains/Plains States: New Mexico
Central States: Kentucky
Southeastern States: South Carolina
Northeastern States: Connecticut

== 2010 results ==
National Winners
1st Place: California - Arcadia High School (Arcadia, California)
2nd Place: Alabama
3rd Place: Virginia

Honorable Mention
(top ten)
4th Place: Oregon
5th Place: Colorado
6th Place: New Jersey
7th Place: Florida
8th Place: Indiana
9th Place: Westminster Christian Academy, St. Louis, Missouri
10th Place: Wisconsin

Unit Awards
Best non-finalist team for expertise in each unit of competition
Unit 1: Utah
Unit 2: Connecticut
Unit 3: Arizona
Unit 4: Vermont
Unit 5: Washington
Unit 6: Alaska

Regional Awards
Best non-finalist team from each region
Western States: Nevada
Mountains/Plains States: New Mexico
Central States: Michigan
Southeastern States: North Carolina
Northeastern States: New York

== 2009 results ==
National Winners' Awards
1st Place: Colorado
2nd Place: Alabama
3rd Place: California

Honorable Mention
(top ten)
4th Place: Virginia
New Jersey
Indiana
Florida
Oregon
Michigan
Connecticut

Unit Awards
Best non-finalist team for expertise in each unit of competition
Unit 1: Nevada
Unit 2: New York
Unit 3: New Hampshire
Unit 4: Alaska
Unit 5: Wisconsin
Unit 6: Texas

Regional Awards
Best non-finalist team from each region
Western States: Arizona
Mountains/Plains States: New Mexico
Central States: Missouri
Southeastern States: North Carolina
Northeastern States: Vermont

== 2012 National Competition ==
- 1st: Lincoln High School, Portland, Oregon
- 2nd: Maggie L. Walker Governor's School, Richmond, Virginia
- 3rd: Arcadia High School, Arcadia, California

== 2011 National Competition ==
- 1st: Maggie L. Walker Governor's School, Richmond, Virginia
- 2nd: Amador Valley High School, Pleasanton, California
- 3rd: East Brunswick High School, East Brunswick, New Jersey

== 2010 National Competition ==
- 1st: Arcadia High School, Arcadia, California
- 2nd: Vestavia Hills High School, Vestavia Hills, Alabama
- 3rd: Maggie L. Walker Governor's School, Richmond, Virginia

== 2009 National Competition ==
- 1st: East High School, Denver, Colorado
- 2nd: Vestavia Hills High School, Vestavia Hills, Alabama
- 3rd: Amador Valley High School, Pleasanton, California

== 2008 National Competition ==
- 1st: East High School, Denver, Colorado
- 2nd: Maggie L. Walker Governor's School, Richmond, Virginia
- 3rd: Grant High School, Portland, Oregon

== 2007 National Competition ==
- 1st: East High School, Denver, Colorado
- 2nd: Amador Valley High School, Pleasanton, California
- 3rd: Grant High School, Portland, Oregon

== 2006 National Competition ==
- 1st: East Brunswick High School, East Brunswick, New Jersey
- 2nd: Amador Valley High School, Pleasanton, California
- 3rd: East High School, Denver, Colorado

== 2005 National Competition ==
- 1st: East Brunswick High School, East Brunswick, New Jersey
- 2nd: Grant High School, Portland, Oregon
- 3rd: Maggie L. Walker Governor's School, Richmond, Virginia

== 2004 National Competition ==
- 1st: East Brunswick High School, East Brunswick, New Jersey
- 2nd: Maggie L. Walker Governor's School, Richmond, Virginia
- 3rd: Grant High School, Portland, Oregon

== 2003 National Competition ==
- 1st: Maggie L. Walker Governor's School, Richmond, Virginia
- 2nd: Our Lady of Lourdes Academy, Miami, Florida
- 3rd: East Brunswick High School, East Brunswick, New Jersey

National Champions

- 2002 Dobson High School, Mesa, Arizona
- 2001 Our Lady of Lourdes Academy, Miami Florida
- 2000 Our Lady of Lourdes Academy, Miami Florida
- 1999 Maine South High School, Park Ridge, Illinois
- 1998 East Brunswick High School, East Brunswick, NJ
- 1997 Our Lady of Lourdes, Miami, FL
- 1996 Lincoln High School, Portland, OR
- 1995 Amador Valley High School, Pleasanton, CA
- 1994 Our Lady of Lourdes Academy, Miami, FL
- 1993 Arcadia High School, Arcadia, CA
- 1992 East High School, Denver, CO
- 1991 Lincoln High School, Portland, OR
- 1990 Lincoln High School, Portland, OR
- 1989 Lincoln Southeast High School, Lincoln, NE
- 1988 Gompers Secondary School, San Diego, CA
