= Joe Terry =

American football player (born 1965)

No. 50
- Position: Linebacker

Personal information
- Born: May 7, 1965 (age 61); Pleasanton, California
- Listed height: 6 ft 2 in (1.88 m)
- Listed weight: 230 lb (104 kg)

Career information
- High school: Amador Valley High School
- College: Cal State-Hayward
- NFL draft: 1987: undrafted

Career history
- Seattle Seahawks (1987)
- Stats at Pro Football Reference

Joe Terry (born May 7, 1965) is a retired United States professional American football Linebacker who played one season in the National Football League with the Seattle Seahawks in 1987.

Terry joined Culture Partners (formerly known as Partners in Leadership) as their Chief Executive Officer in August 2020. Since his time as CEO, he has become an advocate for the importance of culture on business success and believes Culture Partners "is a place that could truly make a difference in the world"
