= Foothill High School (Pleasanton, California) =

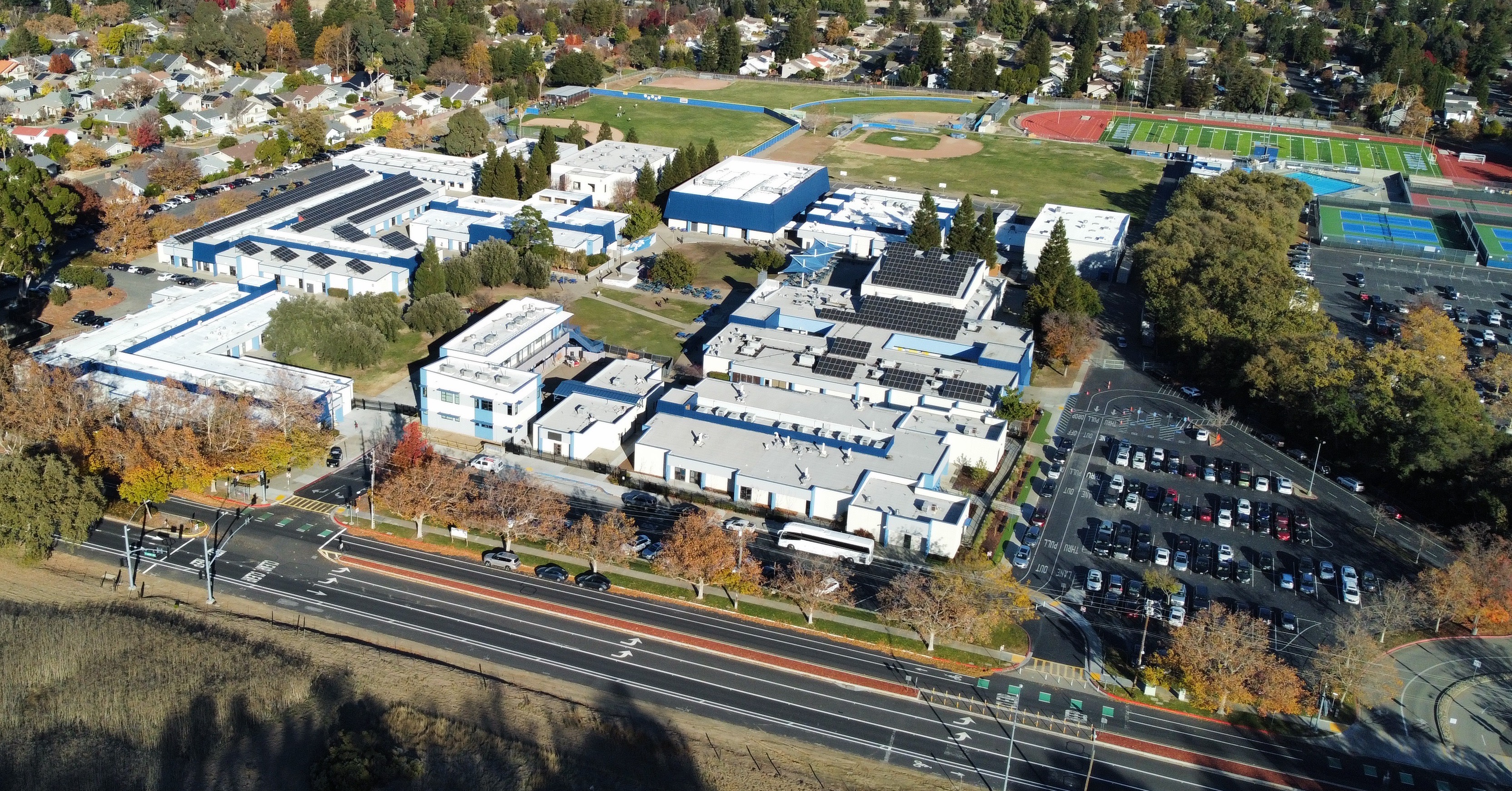

Location
- 4375 Foothill Road; Pleasanton, California 94588; United States; 37°40′23″N 121°55′09″W

Information
- Other name: FHS
- Type: Public high school
- Established: 1973
- School district: Pleasanton Unified School District
- NCES School ID: 060002009279
- Principal: Sebastian Bull
- Grades: 9–12
- Gender: Co-educational
- Enrollment: 2,208 (2023–2024)
- Colors: Blue and Gold
- Mascot: Falcon
- Rival: Amador Valley High School
- Newspaper: InFlight
- Yearbook: Halcyon
- Website: foothill.pleasantonusd.net

Foothill High School (FHS) is a public high school in Pleasanton, California, United States. It was established in 1973 and is part of the Pleasanton Unified School District. It is a fully accredited WASC school, with its six-year WASC accreditation approved in the 2018–2019 school year. It was recognized as a California Distinguished School in 1994, 2001, 2005 and 2019. It was a 2002 nominee and a 2006 winner of the National Blue Ribbon Award.

== History and campus developments ==
Foothill High School opened in 1973 to serve the growing population of Pleasanton and neighboring communities. Over the decades, the campus expanded with new classrooms, athletic facilities, arts spaces, and community partnerships with local organizations.

== Incidents and legal matters ==
Throughout its history, Foothill High School has been the subject of several widely reported incidents, investigations, and legal matters, drawing local and regional media attention.

=== Notable campus incidents ===
- In 2005, a fire of suspicious origin destroyed a computer lab housed in a portable classroom on the Foothill High School campus. The blaze required multiple fire engines to extinguish and caused smoke damage to adjacent classrooms; investigators also found racist and homophobic graffiti on site, though police did not immediately establish a connection between the two events. A reward was offered for information leading to an arrest.
- In 2013, police increased patrols at Foothill High School after threatening graffiti referencing a school shooting was discovered in a girls’ restroom. The message prompted administrators to communicate closely with students, families, and law enforcement, though no actual attack occurred.
- In 2016, a 20-year-old former student was arrested at Foothill High for alleged sexual battery and related charges after an incident in the school’s parking lot; he was found to have a concealed knife when detained by police later the same day.

=== Staff legal matters ===
- In December 2022, Foothill High School’s director of bands, Efrain Hinojosa, was arrested on campus on suspicion of sex crimes allegedly committed while he was previously employed at another district. The charges stemmed from alleged conduct with a minor student in a prior school setting; Hinojosa was placed on administrative leave and later took a plea deal in 2023 that included jail time, probation, and sex offender registration pursuant to the case.

== Notable alumni ==
- Valerie Arioto, player with the United States women's national softball team
- Brad Bergesen, former pitcher for the Baltimore Orioles and Arizona Diamondbacks
- Brandon Crawford, infielder for three-time World Series champion San Francisco Giants
- Paula Creamer, professional golfer on LPGA Tour
- Brett de Geus, MLB pitcher
- Todd Fischer, professional golfer on PGA Tour
- Jackson Flora, baseball player
- T. J. Friedl, baseball player
- Lucy Guo, social media influencer and engineer who co-founded Scale AI
- Sean Mannion, former quarterback at Oregon State University and with the Minnesota Vikings
- Keith Millard, former NFL defensive tackle and defensive line coach for the Tampa Bay Buccaneers
- Eric Moran, former NFL player
- Rich Moran, former NFL player
- Bob Otto, former NFL player
- Ryan Roxie, guitarist and singer-songwriter
- Jason Tarver, football coach
- Gabrielle Union, actress and model
- Ben Wooldridge, professional football quarterback for the New England Patriots
