= Rick Kane =

American football player (1954–2009)

No. 32, 40
- Position: Running back

Personal information
- Born: November 12, 1954; Lincoln, Nebraska, U.S.
- Died: December 25, 2009 (aged 55); Reno, Nevada, U.S.
- Listed height: 5 ft 11 in (1.80 m)
- Listed weight: 200 lb (91 kg)

Career information
- High school: Amador Valley (CA)
- College: Oregon; San Jose State
- NFL draft: 1977: 3rd round, 69th overall pick

Career history
- Detroit Lions (1977–1983); Washington Redskins (1984); Detroit Lions (1985)

Career NFL statistics
- Rushing attempts: 409
- Rushing yards: 1,486
- Rushing TDs: 12
- Stats at Pro Football Reference

Richard James Kane (November 12, 1954 – December 25, 2009) was an American professional football running back in the National Football League (NFL) for the Detroit Lions from 1977 to 1983, and 1985 to 1986. Kane rushed for 1,486 yards during his NFL career.

== Biography ==
Kane was born on November 12, 1954, in Lincoln, Nebraska to Gerald James Kane and Orletha Ann (Fiala) Kane. He had one sister, Diane. The family moved to Pleasanton, California when Kane was 12, and he played football at and graduated from Amador Valley High School. He attended University of Oregon for two years and was awarded the Len Casanova Award for Rookie of the year in 1973. He transferred to San Jose State University where he became the first player in school history to rush 1,000 yards.

Kane was drafted by the Detroit Lions in the third round (69th overall) of the 1977 NFL draft, where he remained for the majority of his career. He played 12 games with the Washington Redskins during the 1984 season after being placed on waivers by the Lions. The following May, he was again placed on waivers but re-signed with the Lions on a one-year contract. He was released in February 1986.

After retiring from football, Kane worked as a car salesman in Reno, Nevada. In 2005, a teenage girl using her cell phone crashed into his motorcycle, resulting in the loss of his leg. He and his wife Dianne had three sons and one daughter. He died December 25, 2009, in Reno, Nevada due to complications from pneumonia. His funeral was held at a Church of Jesus Christ of Latter-day Saints meetinghouse in Reno.

== College statistics ==
Year	Team	Games	Rushing				Receiving			
Year	Team	G	Att	Yds	Avg	TD	Rec	Yds	Avg	TD
1975	SJ	11	210	1,144	5.4	7	7	61	8.7	0
1976	SJ	11	161	923	5.1	6	17	254	14.9	3
Career		22	371	1,967	5.3	13	24	315	13.3	3

== Professional career statistics ==
Year	Team	Games		Rushing					Receiving				
Year	Team	G	GS	Att	Yds	Avg	Lng	TD	Rec	Yds	Avg	Lng	TD
1977	DET	14	6	124	421	8.9	35	4	18	186	13.3	20	0
1978	DET	15	0	44	153	2.9	19	2	16	161	10.1	26	0
1979	DET	16	6	94	332	5.9	26	4	9	104	11.6	36	1
1980	DET	16	0	31	125	1.9	22	0	5	26	5.2	9	0
1981	DET	16	2	77	332	4.8	20	2	17	181	10.6	40	1
1982	DET	6	0	7	17	2.4	6	0	3	25	8.3	12	0
1983	DET	14	0	4	19	4.8	9	0	2	15	7.5	9	0
1984	WAS	12	0	17	43	2.5	10	0	1	7	7	7	0
1985	DET	16	1	11	44	4	7	0	5	56	11.2	18	0
Career		125	15	409	1,486	3.6	35	12	76	761	10	40	2
