= Mike Burke (punter) =

American football player (born 1950)

No. 11
- Position: Punter

Personal information
- Born: July 28, 1950 (age 76); Sacramento, California
- Listed height: 5 ft 10 in (1.78 m)
- Listed weight: 188 lb (85 kg)

Career information
- High school: Amador Valley
- College: Miami
- NFL draft: 1973: undrafted

Career history
- Miami Dolphins (1973)*; Los Angeles Rams (1974)
- * Offseason or practice squad member only

Career NFL statistics
- Punts: 46
- Punt Yards: 1,701
- Punt Average: 37
- Stats at Pro Football Reference

Michael Dennis Burke (born July 28, 1950) is a retired United States professional American-football punter who played 1 season in the National Football League with the Los Angeles Rams in 1974. He played college football for Oregon State and University of Miami.
