= Greg Kragen =

American football player (born 1962)

No. 71
- Position: Nose tackle

Personal information
- Born: March 4, 1962 (age 64); Chicago, Illinois, U.S.
- Listed height: 6 ft 3 in (1.91 m)
- Listed weight: 267 lb (121 kg)

Career information
- High school: Amador Valley (Pleasanton, California)
- College: Utah State
- NFL draft: 1984: undrafted
- Expansion draft: 1995: 9th round, 18th overall pick

Career history
- Denver Broncos (1984–1993); Kansas City Chiefs (1994); Carolina Panthers (1995–1997)

Awards and highlights
- Second-team All-Pro (1992); Pro Bowl (1989)

Career NFL statistics
- Sacks: 28.5
- Games: 200
- Interceptions: 1
- Stats at Pro Football Reference

Gregory John Kragen (born March 4, 1962) is an American former professional football player who was a nose tackle in the National Football League (NFL). He played in three Super Bowls and five championship games. He was selected for the Pro Bowl in 1989 and made the All-Madden team twice.

Kragen went to high school at Amador Valley High School in Pleasanton, California, and then played college football for the Utah State Aggies and went undrafted in the 1984 NFL draft. After trying out for the Denver Broncos, he was cut. The next year, he again was invited to training camp and this time he made the team. His career lasted thirteen years. He played nine seasons for the Broncos followed by a year for the Kansas City Chiefs. Then he was selected by the Carolina Panthers in the 1995 NFL expansion draft, and played his final three seasons with that team.
