= Scott Peters (American football) =

American football player and coach (born 1978)

Cincinnati Bengals
- Title: Offensive line coach

Personal information
- Born: November 23, 1978 (age 47); Arcadia, California, U.S.
- Listed height: 6 ft 3 in (1.91 m)
- Listed weight: 300 lb (136 kg)

Career information
- Position: Center (No. 63)
- High school: Amador Valley (Pleasanton, California)
- College: Arizona State
- NFL draft: 2002: 4th round, 124th overall pick

Career history

Playing
- Philadelphia Eagles (2002); New York Giants (2003); San Francisco 49ers (2004); Carolina Panthers (2005–2006); Arizona Cardinals (2007−2008)

Coaching
- Cleveland Browns (2020–2023) Assistant offensive line coach; New England Patriots (2024) Offensive line coach; Cincinnati Bengals (2025–present) Offensive line coach

Awards and highlights
- 2× First-team All-Pac-10 (2000, 2001)

Career NFL statistics
- Games played: 7
- Games started: 4
- Stats at Pro Football Reference

Scott Thomas Peters (born November 23, 1978) is an American football offensive line coach for the Cincinnati Bengals of the National Football League (NFL). He was also a center in the NFL. He played college football for the Arizona State Sun Devils, and high school football at Amador Valley High School. Peters was a member of the Philadelphia Eagles, Arizona Cardinals, Carolina Panthers, San Francisco 49ers and New York Giants.

== Playing career ==
Pre-draft measurables
Height	Weight	Arm length	Hand span	40-yard dash	10-yard split	20-yard split	20-yard shuttle	Three-cone drill	Vertical jump	Broad jump	Bench press
6 ft 3 1/4 in (1.91 m)	300 lb (136 kg)	33 in (0.84 m)	10 1/4 in (0.26 m)	5.08 s	1.78 s	2.95 s	4.69 s	7.68 s	33.5 in (0.85 m)	8 ft 1 in (2.46 m)	36 reps
All values from NFL Combine

Peters was drafted in 2002 by the Philadelphia Eagles (124th overall). He played for seven seasons in the NFL, and was accredited with six seasons, as an offensive guard and center before retiring from football in 2009.

== Coaching career ==
=== Cleveland Browns ===
On February 13, 2020, Peters was hired by the Cleveland Browns as their assistant offensive line coach under head coach Kevin Stefanski. Peters has been open about using Brazilian jiu-jitsu in order to help train the team.

Peters missed the team's wild card playoff game against the Pittsburgh Steelers on January 10, 2021, due to COVID-19 protocols, but returned for the next playoff game.

=== New England Patriots ===
On February 19, 2024, Peters was hired by the New England Patriots as their offensive line coach under head coach Jerod Mayo.

=== Cincinnati Bengals ===
On January 20, 2025, the Cincinnati Bengals hired Peters to serve as their offensive line coach.
