= Chris Geile =

American football player (born 1964)

No. 71
- Position: Offensive lineman

Personal information
- Born: April 14, 1964 (age 62); Anaheim, California, U.S.
- Listed height: 6 ft 4 in (1.93 m)
- Listed weight: 305 lb (138 kg)

Career information
- High school: Amador Valley
- College: Eastern Illinois
- NFL draft: 1987: undrafted

Career history
- Toronto Argonauts (1987)*; Detroit Lions (1987)
- * Offseason or practice squad member only

Career NFL statistics
- Games played: 3
- Games started: 1
- Stats at Pro Football Reference

Chris Geile (born April 14, 1964) is an American former professional football player who was an offensive lineman for one season with the Detroit Lions of the National Football League (NFL) in 1987. He played college football for the Eastern Illinois Panthers.
