= Keith Millard =

American football player and coach (born 1962)

No. 93, 75, 77
- Positions: Defensive tackle, defensive end

Personal information
- Born: March 18, 1962 (age 64); Pleasanton, California, U.S.
- Listed height: 6 ft 6 in (1.98 m)
- Listed weight: 260 lb (118 kg)

Career information
- High school: Foothill (Pleasanton)
- College: Washington State
- NFL draft: 1984: 1st round, 13th overall pick

Career history

Playing
- Jacksonville Bulls (1985); Minnesota Vikings (1985–1991); Seattle Seahawks (1992); Green Bay Packers (1992); Philadelphia Eagles (1993)

Coaching
- Los Angeles Dragons (2000) Assistant coach; San Francisco Demons (2001) Defensive line; Denver Broncos (2002–2004) Assistant defensive line; Oakland Raiders (2005–2008) Defensive line; Merced College (2009) Defensive line; Tampa Bay Buccaneers (2011) Defensive coordinator; Tennessee Titans (2012) Defensive assistant

Awards and highlights
- NFL Defensive Player of the Year (1989); UPI NFC Player of the Year (1989); 2× First-team All-Pro (1988, 1989); Second-team All-Pro (1987); 2× Pro Bowl (1988, 1989); NFL 1980s All-Decade Team; 50 Greatest Vikings; Second-team All-Time USFL team; First-team All-American (1983); Morris Trophy (1983); First-team All-Pac-10 (1983)

Career NFL statistics
- Sacks: 58
- Fumble recoveries: 10
- Interceptions: 2
- Total touchdowns: 1
- Stats at Pro Football Reference
- Coaching profile at Pro Football Reference

Keith Joseph Millard (born March 18, 1962) is an American former professional football player who played as a defensive tackle for nine seasons for the Minnesota Vikings, Green Bay Packers, Seattle Seahawks and Philadelphia Eagles from 1985 to 1993 in the National Football League (NFL).

== Early life and college ==
Millard was born in Pleasanton, California to Brian Appleford, a British Royal Marine, and Paddie McCloskey. The two separated when Millard was two years old and were divorced three years later. One year later, Paddie met and married Jack Millard, a carpet layer, and insisted that her children be adopted by Millard.

He was a tight end and linebacker at Foothill High School in Pleasanton. He played college football at Washington State University. As a freshman Millard played tight end but was moved to defensive tackle as a sophomore, where he started first time as a junior. He was voted first-team All-Pac-10 as a senior and won the Morris Trophy as the Pac-10's top defensive lineman. As a senior, he was named a first-team All-American by Gannett News Service.

== Professional career ==
Millard was selected by the Vikings based on a recommendation from their scout Don Deisch in the first round of the 1984 NFL draft and played one season in the USFL. He was selected to the Pro Bowl in 1988 and 1989. He held the NFL record for most sacks in a single season by a defensive tackle with 18 in 1989, and was named NFL Defensive Player of the Year that season. His record was broken by Aaron Donald in 2018. The following season he suffered a career-changing injury in a week 4 contest versus Tampa Bay, tearing both his medial collateral and anterior cruciate ligaments in his right knee when his cleats got caught up in landing when trying to leap over a player that had his knees buckle. The injury effectively ended his time in Minnesota. He played with three further teams and retired twice.

Millard's large stature was a huge asset in bulking up the Minnesota Vikings defensive line. His All-Pro honors and record-setting sacks make him a Minnesota Vikings great. He played in 93 games during his career, making 58 sacks, and two interceptions.

Millard was voted among the top 50 players to ever play for the Minnesota Vikings In 2010.

== NFL career statistics ==
Legend
	NFL Defensive Player of the Year
**Bold**	Career high

Year	Team	GP	Tackles				Fumbles			Interceptions					
Year	Team	GP	Cmb	Solo	Ast	Sck	FF	FR	Yds	Int	Yds	Avg	Lng	TD	PD
1985	MIN	16	0	0	0	11.0	0	1	0	0	0	0.0	0	0	0
1986	MIN	15	0	0	0	10.5	0	1	3	**1**	17	17.0	17	0	0
1987	MIN	9	0	0	0	3.5	0	**2**	8	0	0	0.0	0	0	0
1988	MIN	15	0	0	0	8.0	0	**2**	5	0	0	0.0	0	0	0
1989	MIN	16	0	0	0	**18.0**	0	1	**31**	**1**	**48**	**48.0**	**48**	0	0
1990	MIN	4	0	0	0	2.0	0	0	0	0	0	0.0	0	0	0
1991	MIN	0	Did not play due to injury												
1992	GB	2	0	0	0	0.0	0	1	0	0	0	0.0	0	0	0
1992	SEA	2	0	0	0	1.0	0	1	0	0	0	0.0	0	0	0
1993	PHI	14	19	18	1	4.0	0	1	0	0	0	0.0	0	0	0
Career		93	19	18	1	58.0	0	10	47	2	65	32.5	48	0	0

== Coaching career ==
After retirement as a player, Millard went on to coaching. He coached at the college level, in the Spring Football League with the Los Angeles Dragons, and the XFL, San Francisco Demons, before getting a job with the Denver Broncos' coaching staff as the club's defensive line coach/pass rush specialist. He was in charge of creating and implementing all pass rush techniques used in the Broncos' defensive scheme. Under Millard, the Broncos had one of the toughest defenses in the league. Millard coached the Oakland Raiders defensive line from 2005 to 2007. In 2009, he was hired as the defensive coordinator for the Merced College Blue Devils. On February 8, 2011, it was announced that Millard, along with Grady Stretz, will be a defensive line coach for the Tampa Bay Buccaneers, specializing in pass rush. In 2012, Millard was hired by the Titans as an assistant coach. When he was let go in 2013, he elected to spend more time with his family.
