= California Association of Regional Occupational Centers and Programs =

Association of vocational programs in California, USA

The California Association of Regional Occupational Centers and Programs (CAROCP) is an organization that promotes and supports ROCPs in providing career education, career development, and workforce preparation that contributes to student academic and career success and to the economic development of California. CAROCP has 72 centers and programs in California. The programs offers occupational training to students in the K - 16 educational system. The goal of ROP is to help students gain knowledge and skills for future careers.

== Organization ==
Regional Occupational Centers and Programs originated in 1967. There are 74 ROCPs in California that serve almost 520,000 high school students and adults annually. ROCPs operate under three different governing formats:

- Joint Power Agreements between two or more school districts (25 ROCPs)
- County Board of Education (43 ROCPs)
- Single Districts (6 ROCPs)

ROCPs are designed to serve the state's interests in providing quality career preparation and technical education.

== Program ==
Technical education courses are offered in areas such as Graphic Design, Information Technology, Agriculture, Business, Culinary Arts, Healthcare, Construction, and Auto Technology. ROCPs offer tuition-free courses. The course offerings are based upon current and future local labor market demands. ROCP teachers are fully credentialed by the California Commission on Teacher Credentialing. The teachers utilize their industry experience to prepare students for a competitive job market.

== Resources ==
- (CAROCP) California Association of Regional Occupational Centers and Programs^{[usurped]}
- Santa Barbara County Regional Occupational Program
- Tri-Valley Regional Occupational Program
