= Pleasanton Unified School District =

School district in California, United States

Pleasanton Unified School District (PUSD)
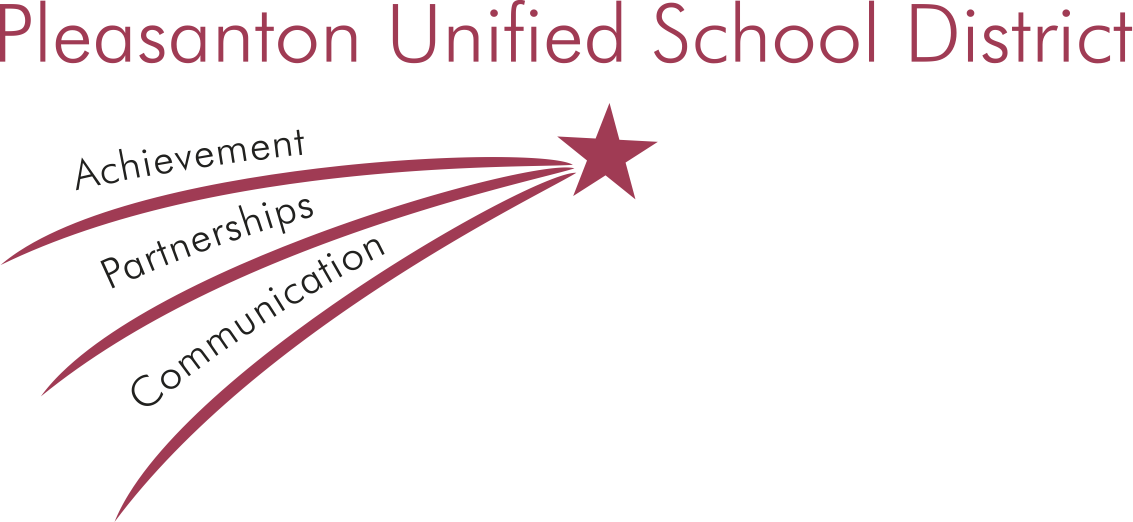

Location
- 4665 Bernal Avenue Pleasanton, California, 94566-7498; United States
- Coordinates: 37°39′22″N 121°52′33″W

District information
- Type: Public
- Grades: K-12
- Established: 1988; 38 years ago
- Superintendent: Maurice Ghysels

Other information
- Website: www.pleasantonusd.net

The Pleasanton Unified School District (PUSD) is a public primary and secondary education school district located in Pleasanton, California, United States, a suburban town east of San Francisco. It consists of nine elementary schools, three middle schools, two comprehensive high schools, and one alternative high school.

It includes the majority of Pleasanton and sections of Hayward and Sunol.

== High schools ==
=== Amador Valley High School ===
Amador Valley High School (commonly called Amador or AVHS) was founded as Amador Valley Joint Union High School. Its first class graduated in 1923. The school has been named a California Distinguished School, a National School of Character, and a National Blue Ribbon School. The school mascot is the Don.

=== Foothill High School ===
Foothill High School (commonly called Foothill or FHS) was built in 1973. The current enrollment is 2,343 students. The school mascot is the falcon and its colors are yellow and blue. The official rival school is Amador Valley High School. FHS was a 2006 winner of the National Blue Ribbon Award, was a 2002 National Blue Ribbon California Nominee, and was recognized as a 2001 California Distinguished School.

Both school offer a wide variety of sports, such as football, cross country, soccer, basketball, swimming, golf, volleyball, marching band, and more.

== Middle schools ==
=== Pleasanton Middle School ===
Pleasanton Middle School (PMS) is a grade 6-8 formulated middle school. The school opened in 1991, and is a California Distinguished School. Around 1300 students attend this school with 65 teachers. The school mascot is the Panther. PMS plays other schools like Harvest Park Middle School and Hart Middle School in various activities and sports, including basketball, volleyball, and wrestling. It is located next to Hearst Elementary School, and is in walking distance from the public library and downtown Pleasanton. One of the outstanding parts of the school is its cultural diversity and acceptance. From the Bhangra Club to the Model United Nations Club, there are many activities available at this middle school.

In 2020, the Black Student Union (BSU) and Latin Student Union (LSU) were created. The BSU and LSU are first ones at any middle school in Pleasanton.

In 2022, the science bowl club won 1st place at the Sandia regional science bowl. They are the first ones in district history to win this competition.

=== Harvest Park Middle School ===
Harvest Park Middle School (HPMS) is a public middle school. It was built in 1968, and is the oldest middle school in Pleasanton. It is located at 4900 Valley Avenue. It is a National Blue Ribbon school, ranked #1 in Pleasanton for education from 2010-2013, and a California Distinguished School. It is located near Walnut Grove Elementary. The school offers sports such as track, volleyball, and ultimate frisbee, as well as a computer program. In track and field, the school ran at outside organization known as Oak Hill Athletics. It is one of the top rated schools in the Pleasanton area. Its mascot is the Patriot.

=== Thomas S. Hart Middle School ===
Thomas S. Hart Middle School was founded in 2000. It is the newest middle school in the district. Its mascot is the Husky. It has many sports such as ultimate frisbee, track, cross country, cricket, volleyball, ping pong, golf, basketball, and color guard. The school was named after Thomas S. Hart, a well-loved teacher, principal and assistant superintendent of the Pleasanton Unified School District.

== Elementary schools ==
=== Alisal ===
Alisal was named after the city in the 1700-1800s, before Pleasanton got its name.

=== Donlon ===
Donlon Elementary is a school that was built in 1969. Around 729 students are currently enrolled. The mascot is a cub.

=== Fairlands ===
Fairlands was built in 1969 and is located at 4151 W. Las Positas Boulevard.On 2025, it’s currently serving 648 students. Principal of Fairlands is Ms Heidi Deeringhoff, Vice Principal is Mrs Kaycie Norton. It has been recognized as a California Distinguished School four times. Its mascot is a "flyer" (a hot air balloon).

=== Hearst ===
Hearst Elementary School is located on Case Avenue near Pleasanton Middle School. It enrolls students from grades K-5. Its slogan is "Home of the Monarchs", and its mascot is the monarch butterfly.

=== Lydiksen ===
Built in 1967 and named in honor of George C. Lydiksen, the school serves around 700 students ranging from TK (transitional kindergarten) to fifth grade. The school has been recognized as a California Distinguished School and California Gold Ribbon School, with test scores in the top 10% of all schools in California. The mascot is a Lancer

=== Mohr ===
Opened in 1997, Mohr Elementary School was named after Henry P. Mohr, a farmer and prominent member of the Pleasanton community. In 2021, the school served 663 students. The school was named a California Distinguished School in 2020. The mascot is an eagle.

=== Valley View ===
Opened in 1960, Valley View Elementary School is the only elementary school in the district that operates a Spanish-English dual-immersion program. In 2017-2018, the school served 645 students. The mascot is a mustang.

=== Walnut Grove ===
Walnut Grove Elementary School opened in 1968 and served 749 students in the 2019-20 school year. The mascot of the school is a roadrunner.

== Continuation schools ==
=== Village High School ===
Village High School (commonly Village) is a public continuation high school. It was formed to serve students from Amador Valley and Foothill with low grades, multiple absences, or credit deficiencies.
