= Rich Moran =

American football player (born 1962)

No. 57
- Positions: Guard, center

Personal information
- Born: March 19, 1962 (age 64); Boise, Idaho, U.S.
- Listed height: 6 ft 3 in (1.91 m)
- Listed weight: 276 lb (125 kg)

Career information
- High school: Foothill (Pleasanton, California)
- College: San Diego State
- NFL draft: 1985: 3rd round, 71st overall pick

Career history
- Green Bay Packers (1985–1993)

Awards and highlights
- First-team All-WAC (1984)

Career NFL statistics
- Games played: 108
- Games started: 82
- Fumble recoveries: 3
- Stats at Pro Football Reference

Rich James Moran (born March 19, 1962) is an American former professional football player who was a guard in the National Football League (NFL) for nine seasons with the Green Bay Packers. He was selected by the Packers in the third round of the 1985 NFL draft.
