= 1985 Detroit Lions season =

NFL team season

- Owner: William Clay Ford Sr.
- General manager: Russ Thomas
- Head coach: Darryl Rogers
- Home stadium: Pontiac Silverdome

Results
- Record: 7–9
- Division place: 4th NFC Central
- Playoffs: Did not qualify
- All-Pros: None
- Pro Bowlers: None

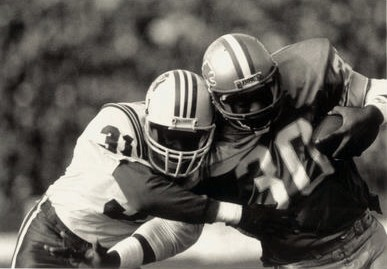
New England Patriots free safety Fred Marion attempting to tackle Detroit Lions' running back James Jones during a 1985 home game.

The 1985 Detroit Lions season was their 56th in the National Football League. In Darryl Rogers first year as head coach, the team improved upon their previous season's output of 4–11–1, winning seven games. The Lions beat four playoff teams at home, Dallas, San Francisco, Miami, and the New York Jets, but lost to Tampa Bay and Indianapolis on the road. The Lions stood at 5–3 at the halfway point of the season. However, despite their overall improvement, the Lions went winless in December (0–3) and missed the playoffs for the second straight year with a 7–9 record.

== Offseason ==
=== NFL draft ===
1985 Detroit Lions draft
| Round | Pick | Player | Position | College | Notes |
| 1 | 6 | Lomas Brown * | Offensive tackle | Florida | |
| 2 | 34 | Kevin Glover * | Center | Maryland | |
| 3 | 62 | James Johnson | Linebacker | San Diego State | |
| 4 | 90 | Kevin Hancock | Linebacker | Baylor | |
| 5 | 118 | Joe McIntosh | Running back | NC State | |
| 6 | 146 | Stan Short | Guard | Penn State | |
| 7 | 174 | Tony Staten | Cornerback | Angelo State | |
| 8 | 202 | Scott Caldwell | Running back | Texas–Arlington | |
| 9 | 230 | June James | Linebacker | Texas | |
| 10 | 258 | Clayton Beauford | Wide receiver | Auburn | |
| 11 | 286 | Kevin Harris | Safety | Georgia | |
| 12 | 314 | Mike Weaver | Guard | Georgia | |
Made roster * Made at least one Pro Bowl during career

=== Undrafted free agents ===
1985 undrafted free agents of note
| Player | Position | College |
|---|---|---|
| Scott Alward | Tight end | Ferris State |
| Scott Barrows | Guard | West Virginia |
| Jim Browne | Fullback | Boston College |
| Rich Capolongo | Guard | Rhode Island |
| Alan Chrite | Linebacker | Colorado |
| Jeff Colvin | Tight end | Colorado |
| Ron Cross | Safety | Fresno State |
| Ken Graeber | Nose tackle | Nebraska |
| Jason Grimes | Wide receiver | Tennessee |
| Doug Isbell | Tackle | Purdue |
| Jeff Jackson | Defensive end | Toledo |
| Jack Keslar | Tackle | West Virginia |
| Joe Masaniai | Defensive end | Kansas |
| Burt Muenhling | Tight end | Kearney State |
| Gary Mullen | Wide receiver | West Virginia |
| Mike Northcult | Wide receiver | Angelo State |
| Jeff Pierzynski | Linebacker | Eastern Michigan |
| Dwayne Rogers | Linebacker | Youngstown State |
| Mark Royster | Safety | Wichita State |
| Kevin Spitzig | Linebacker | Iowa |
| Mike White | Tackle | Arizona State |

== Personnel ==
=== Staff ===
1985 Detroit Lions staff
| Front office: Owner – William Clay Ford Sr.; General manager – Russ Thomas; Head coaches: Head coach – Darryl Rogers; Assistant Head Coach – Don Doll; Offensive coaches: Offensive coordinator – Bob Baker; Running backs – Ivy Williams; Wide receivers – Paul Lanham; Tight ends – Don Doll; Offensive line – Bill Muir | Defensive coaches: Defensive coordinator – Wayne Fontes; Defensive assistant coach – Don Clemons; Defensive line – Rex Norris; Linebackers – Mike Murphy; Defensive backs – Willie Shaw; Special teams coaches: Special teams – Carl Battershell; Strength and conditioning: Strength and Conditioning Coordinator – Don Clemons |

=== Roster ===
1985 Detroit Lions roster
| Quarterbacks (QB): 12 Joe Ferguson; 17 Eric Hipple; Running backs (RB): 34 A. J. Jones; 30 James Jones; 32 Rick Kane; 36 Mike Meade; 24 Alvin Moore; Wide receivers (WR): 80 Carl Bland; 82 Pete Mandley; 39 Leonard Thompson; Tight ends (TE): 87 David Lewis; 81 Reese McCall; 84 Rob Rubick | Offensive linemen (OL): 75 Lomas Brown T; 72 Chris Dieterich G; 70 Keith Dorney T/G; 67 Don Greco G; 52 Steve Mott C; 65 Mark Stevenson G/C; 71 Rich Strenger T; Defensive linemen (DL): 68 Steve Baack NT; 66 Leon Evans DE; 62 Keith Ferguson DE; 79 William Gay DE; 62 Curtis Green DE; 63 Martin Moss DE | Linebackers (LB): 54 Roosevelt Barnes OLB; 97 Dan Bunz ILB; 50 August Curley ILB; 57 Ken Fantetti ILB; 96 June James; 92 Angelo King OLB; 98 Vernon Maxwell ILB; 59 Jimmy Williams OLB; Defensive backs (DB): 42 John Bostic CB; 26 William Frizzell SS; 40 Duane Galloway CB; 33 William Graham FS; 35 Alvin Hall FS; 21 Demetrious Johnson SS; 29 Bruce McNorton CB; 27 Bobby Watkins CB; Special teams (ST): 11 Mike Black P; 3 Eddie Murray K; 60 Tom Turnure LS | Reserve: 95 Kurt Allerman LB (IR); -- Clayton Beauford WR (NF-Inj.); 23 Arnold Brown CB (IR); 89 Jeff Chadwick WR (IR); 55 Mike Cofer LB (IR); 44 Dave D'Addio RB (IR); 93 Kirk Dodge LB (IR); 78 Doug English NT (IR); 53 Kevin Glover C (IR); -- Kevin Hancock LB (IR); 58 James Harrell LB (IR); -- James Johnson LB (IR); 51 David Jones G (IR); 73 Donald Laster T (IR); 14 Mike Machurek QB (IR); 28 Wilbert Montgomery RB (IR); 86 Mark Nichols WR (IR); 20 Billy Sims RB (PUP); 61 Ray Snell G (IR); 76 Eric Williams DE (IR); Rookies in italics |

== Schedule ==
| Week | Date | Opponent | Result | Record | Attendance |
|---|---|---|---|---|---|
| 1 | September 8 | at Atlanta Falcons | **W** 28–27 | 1–0 | 37,785 |
| 2 | September 15 | Dallas Cowboys | **W** 26–21 | 2–0 | 72,985 |
| 3 | September 22 | at Indianapolis Colts | **L** 14–6 | 2–1 | 60,042 |
| 4 | September 29 | **Tampa Bay Buccaneers** | **W** 30–9 | 3–1 | 45,023 |
| 5 | October 6 | at **Green Bay Packers** | **L** 43–10 | 3–2 | 55,914 |
| 6 | October 13 | at Washington Redskins | **L** 24–3 | 3–3 | 52,845 |
| 7 | October 20 | San Francisco 49ers | **W** 23–21 | 4–3 | 67,715 |
| 8 | October 27 | Miami Dolphins | **W** 31–21 | 5–3 | 75,291 |
| 9 | November 3 | at **Minnesota Vikings** | **L** 16–13 | 5–4 | 58,012 |
| 10 | November 10 | at **Chicago Bears** | **L** 24–3 | 5–5 | 53,467 |
| 11 | November 17 | **Minnesota Vikings** | **W** 41–21 | 6–5 | 54,647 |
| 12 | November 24 | at **Tampa Bay Buccaneers** | **L** 19–16_{(OT)} | 6–6 | 43,471 |
| 13 | November 28 | New York Jets | **W** 31–20 | 7–6 | 65,531 |
| 14 | December 8 | at New England Patriots | **L** 23–6 | 7–7 | 59,078 |
| 15 | December 15 | **Green Bay Packers** | **L** 26–23 | 7–8 | 49,379 |
| 16 | December 22 | **Chicago Bears** | **L** 37–17 | 7–9 | 74,042 |
Note: Intra-divisional opponents are in **bold** text

== Season summary ==
=== Week 1 ===
| Team | 1 | 2 | 3 | 4 | Total |
|---|---|---|---|---|---|
| • Lions | 0 | 14 | 14 | 0 | 28 |
| Falcons | 14 | 7 | 0 | 6 | 27 |

- Date: September 8
- Location: Atlanta-Fulton County Stadium
- Game start: 1:00 p.m. EST
- Game attendance: 37,785
- Game weather: 79 °F or 26.1 °C; wind 7 miles per hour (11 km/h; 6.1 kn)

Scoring summary
| Q1 | 10:42 | ATL | Riggs 1 yard run (Luckhurst kick) | ATL 7–0 |
| Q1 | 0:33 | ATL | Brown 12 yard pass from Bartkowski (Luckhurst kick) | ATL 14–0 |
| Q2 | 10:52 | DET | Jones 8 yard pass from Hipple (Murray kick) | ATL 14–7 |
| Q2 | 3:45 | DET | Chadwick 15 yard pass from Hipple (Murray kick) | Tie 14–14 |
| Q2 | 1:54 | ATL | Johnson 35 yard pass from Bartkowski (Luckhurst kick) | ATL 21–14 |
| Q3 | 7:29 | DET | Chadwick 9 yard pass from Hipple (Murray kick) | Tie 21–21 |
| Q3 | 4:52 | DET | Jones 21 yard run (Murray kick) | DET 28–21 |
| Q4 | 14:56 | ATL | Luckhurst 46 yard field goal | DET 28–24 |
| Q4 | 7:15 | ATL | Luckhurst 31 yard field goal | DET 28–27 |

== Standings ==
NFC Central
| | W | L | T | PCT | DIV | CONF | PF | PA | STK |
|---|---|---|---|---|---|---|---|---|---|
| Chicago Bears^{(1)} | 15 | 1 | 0 | .938 | 8–0 | 12–0 | 456 | 198 | W3 |
| Green Bay Packers | 8 | 8 | 0 | .500 | 6–2 | 8–4 | 337 | 355 | W2 |
| Minnesota Vikings | 7 | 9 | 0 | .438 | 3–5 | 5–9 | 346 | 359 | L2 |
| Detroit Lions | 7 | 9 | 0 | .438 | 2–6 | 5–7 | 307 | 366 | L3 |
| Tampa Bay Buccaneers | 2 | 14 | 0 | .125 | 1–7 | 2–10 | 294 | 448 | L4 |
