= 1986 Detroit Lions season =

NFL team season

- Owner: William Clay Ford Sr.
- Head coach: Darryl Rogers
- Home stadium: Pontiac Silverdome

Results
- Record: 5–11
- Division place: 3rd NFC Central
- Playoffs: Did not qualify
- All-Pros: None
- Pro Bowlers: None

The 1986 Detroit Lions season was their 57th in the league. The team failed to improve upon their previous season's output of 7–9 and missed the playoffs for the third straight season with a 5–11 record. The highlight of the season was first round draft choice Chuck Long’s first pass for a TD against Tampa Bay. Long would start in a Monday Night game against the Chicago Bears.

== Offseason ==
=== NFL draft ===
Round	Pick	Player	Position	College
1	12	Chuck Long	QB	Iowa
2	29	Garry James	RB	LSU
3	69	Joe Milinichik	OT	North Carolina State
4	92	Devon Mitchell	S	Iowa
5	119	Oscar Smith	RB	Nicholls State
8	205	Allyn Griffin	WR	Wyoming
9	231	Lyle Pickens	DB	Colorado
10	258	Tracy Johnson	LB	Morningside
11	290	Leland Melvin	WR	Richmond
12	317	Allan Durden	DB	Arizona

== Roster ==
1986 Detroit Lions roster
Quarterbacks (QB): 12 Joe Ferguson; 17 Eric Hipple; 16 Chuck Long; Running backs (RB): 36 Herman Hunter; 32 Garry James; 30 James Jones; 38 Scott Williams; Wide receivers (WR): 80 Carl Bland; 88 Tim Kearse; 82 Pete Mandley; 39 Leonard Thompson; Tight ends (TE): 81 Jimmie Giles; 87 David Lewis; 84 Rob Rubick	Offensive linemen (OL): 61 Scott Barrows C/G; 75 Lomas Brown T; 70 Keith Dorney G; 53 Kevin Glover G; 52 Steve Mott C; 73 Harvey Salem G; 64 Eric Sanders T; 71 Rich Strenger T; Defensive linemen (DL): 68 Steve Baack NT; 66 Leon Evans DE; 77 Keith Ferguson DE; 79 William Gay DE; 62 Curtis Green DE; 76 Eric Williams NT	Linebackers (LB): 96 Paul Butcher ILB; 55 Mike Cofer OLB; 58 James Harrell ILB; 54 James Johnson OLB; 92 Angelo King OLB; 57 Vernon Maxwell ILB; 51 Shelton Robinson ILB; Defensive backs (DB): 43 Donnie Elder CB; 40 Duane Galloway CB; 33 William Graham SS; 34 James Griffin FS; 47 Rod Hill CB; 21 Demetrious Johnson SS; 29 Bruce McNorton CB; 31 Devon Mitchell FS; Special teams (ST): 6 Jim Arnold P; 3 Eddie Murray K	Reserve: 42 John Bostic CB (IR); 23 Arnold Brown CB (IR); 89 Jeff Chadwick WR (IR); 50 August Curley LB (IR); 72 Chris Dieterich G (IR); -- Allen Hughes DE (IR); 95 George Jamison LB (IR); 63 Steve Kenney G (IR); 74 Joe Milinichik G (IR); 24 Alvin Moore RB (IR); 86 Mark Nichols WR (IR); 25 Oscar Smith RB (IR); 27 Bobby Watkins CB (IR); 59 Jimmy Williams LB (IR); Rookies in italics

== Schedule ==
Week	Date	Opponent	Result	Record	Attendance
1	September 7	at **Minnesota Vikings**	**W** 13–10	1–0	54,851
2	September 14	Dallas Cowboys	**L** 31–7	1–1	73,812
3	September 21	**Tampa Bay Buccaneers**	**L** 24–20	1–2	38,453
4	September 28	at Cleveland Browns	**L** 24–21	1–3	72,029
5	October 5	Houston Oilers	**W** 24–13	2–3	41,960
6	October 12	at **Green Bay Packers**	**W** 21–14	3–3	52,290
7	October 19	at Los Angeles Rams	**L** 14–10	3–4	50,992
8	October 26	at **Chicago Bears**	**L** 13–7	3–5	62,064
9	November 2	Cincinnati Bengals	**L** 24–17	3–6	52,423
10	November 9	**Minnesota Vikings**	**L** 24–10	3–7	53,725
11	November 16	at Philadelphia Eagles	**W** 13–11	4–7	54,568
12	November 23	at **Tampa Bay Buccaneers**	**W** 38–17	5–7	30,029
13	November 27	**Green Bay Packers**	**L** 44–40	5–8	61,199
14	December 7	at Pittsburgh Steelers	**L** 27–17	5–9	45,042
15	December 15	**Chicago Bears**	**L** 16–13	5–10	75,602
16	December 21	Atlanta Falcons	**L** 20–6	5–11	35,255
Note: Intra-divisional opponents are in **bold** text.

== Season summary ==
=== Week 1 at Vikings ===
Week One: Detroit Lions (0–0) at Minnesota Vikings (0–0)

Quarter	1	2	3	4	Total
Lions	0	7	3	3	13
Vikings	3	0	0	7	10

at Hubert H. Humphrey Metrodome, Minneapolis, Minnesota

- Date: September 7, 1986
- Game time: 1:00 p.m.
- Game weather: Indoors (dome)
- Game attendance: 54,851
- Referee: Red Cashion
- Box Score, Box Score

Game information

First quarter

- MIN – Chuck Nelson 35-yard field goal, 3:38. Vikings 3–0.

Second quarter

- DET – James Jones 2-yard run (Eddie Murray kick), 1:56. Lions 7–3.

Third quarter

- DET – Eddie Murray 33-yard field goal, 2:01. Lions 10–3.

Fourth quarter

- DET – Eddie Murray 44-yard field goal, 9:05. Lions 13–3.
- MIN – Jim Gustafson 5-yard pass from Tommy Kramer (Chuck Nelson kick), 0:03. Lions 13–10.

Top passers

- DET – Eric Hipple – 8/15, 95 yards, INT
- MIN – Tommy Kramer – 21/38, 223 yards, TD, INT

Top rushers

- DET – James Jones – 36 rushes, 174 yards, TD
- MIN – Darrin Nelson – 11 rushes, 58 yards

Top receivers

- DET – Leonard Thompson – 3 receptions, 40 yards
- MIN – Darrin Nelson – 6 receptions, 74 yards

=== Week 6 ===
Team	1	2	3	4	Total
• Lions	0	14	0	7	21
Packers	0	7	0	7	14

- Date: October 12
- Location: Lambeau Field, Green Bay, Wisconsin
- Game start: 12:00 p.m. CST
- Game weather: 55 °F or 12.8 °C, wind 13 miles per hour (21 km/h; 11 kn)
- Referee: Pat Haggerty
- Source: Pro-Football-Reference.com

Scoring summary
2	DET	Garry James 41 yard run (Eddie Murray kick)	Lions 7–0
2	DET	Scott Williams 1 yard run (Eddie Murray kick)	Lions 14–0
2	GB	James Lofton 5 yard pass from Randy Wright (Al Del Greco kick)	Lions 14–7
4	DET	David Lewis 2 yard pass from Eric Hipple (Eddie Murray kick)	Lions 21–7
4	GB	Dan Ross 6 yard pass from Randy Wright (Al Del Greco kick)	Lions 21–14

== Standings ==
NFC Central
	W	L	T	PCT	DIV	CONF	PF	PA	STK
Chicago Bears^{(2)}	14	2	0	.875	7–1	10–2	352	187	W7
Minnesota Vikings	9	7	0	.563	6–2	8–4	398	273	W1
Detroit Lions	5	11	0	.313	3–5	4–8	277	326	L4
Green Bay Packers	4	12	0	.250	3–5	3–9	254	418	L1
Tampa Bay Buccaneers	2	14	0	.125	1–7	1–13	239	473	L7
