= 1984 Detroit Lions season =

NFL team season

- Owner: William Clay Ford Sr.
- Head coach: Monte Clark
- Home stadium: Pontiac Silverdome

Results
- Record: 4–11–1
- Division place: 4th NFC Central
- Playoffs: Did not qualify
- All-Pros: DT Doug English (2nd team)
- Pro Bowlers: None

The 1984 Detroit Lions season was their 55th in the National Football League. The team failed to improve upon their previous season's output of 9–7, winning only four games. The team missed the playoffs for the first time in three seasons. Like the previous season, the Lions started 1–4, but unlike 1983, the Lions couldn't come back. In a season littered with numerous key injuries, the most painful was star running back Billy Sims suffering a career-ending knee injury in a game against the Minnesota Vikings. In just five seasons in the NFL since joining Detroit in 1980, Sims had set the Lions career rushing mark at 5,106. After the season, Dexter Bussey retired.

== Offseason ==
=== NFL draft ===
Round	Pick	Player	Position	College
1	20	David Lewis	TE	California
2	47	Pete Mandley	WR	Northern Arizona
3	62	Eric Williams	DT	Washington State
3	74	Ernest Anderson	RB	Oklahoma State
3	75	Steve Baack	DE	Oregon
4	106	Dave D'Addio	RB	Maryland
6	160	John Witkowski	QB	Columbia
7	178	Jimmie Carter	LB	New Mexico
7	187	Renwick Atkins	OT	Kansas
8	214	David Jones	C	Texas
9	246	Rich Hollins	WR	West Virginia
10	259	William Frizzell	CB	North Carolina Central
10	273	James Thaxton	S	Louisiana Tech
11	300	Mike Saxon	P	San Diego State
12	327	Glenn Streno	C	Tennessee

== Roster ==
1984 Detroit Lions roster
Quarterbacks (QB): 16 Gary Danielson; 17 Eric Hipple; 14 Mike Machurek; 18 John Witkowski; Running backs (RB): 24 Dexter Bussey; 44 Dave D'Addio; 31 Ken Jenkins; 30 James Jones; 36 Mike Meade; Wide receivers (WR): 80 Carl Bland; 89 Jeff Chadwick; 82 Pete Mandley; 83 Robbie Martin; 86 Mark Nichols; 39 Leonard Thompson; Tight ends (TE): 87 David Lewis; 81 Reese McCall; 84 Rob Rubick	Offensive linemen (OL): 72 Chris Dieterich G/T; 70 Keith Dorney T; 61 Homer Elias G; 65 Amos Fowler C; 67 Don Greco G; 73 Donald Laster T; 64 Larry Lee G/C; Defensive linemen (DL): 68 Steve Baack DE; 66 Mike Cofer DE; 78 Doug English DT; 79 William Gay DE; 62 Curtis Green DT; 63 Martin Moss DE; 76 Eric Williams DE	Linebackers (LB): 54 Roosevelt Barnes OLB; 53 Garry Cobb OLB; 50 August Curley OLB; 93 Kirk Dodge OLB; 58 Steve Doig MLB; 57 Ken Fantetti MLB; 92 Angelo King OLB; 59 Jimmy Williams OLB; Defensive backs (DB): 26 William Frizzell CB/S; 33 William Graham SS; 35 Alvin Hall FS; 21 Demetrious Johnson SS; 43 Al Latimer CB; 29 Bruce McNorton CB; 27 Bobby Watkins CB; Special teams (ST): 11 Mike Black P; 3 Eddie Murray K	Reserve: 51 David Jones C (IR); 74 Dee Monson DT (IR); 52 Steve Mott C (IR); 20 Billy Sims RB (IR); 71 Rich Strenger T (IR); 55 Terry Tautolo LB (IR); 38 Vince Thompson RB (IR); Rookies in italics

== Schedule ==
Week	Date	Opponent	Result	Record	Attendance
1	September 2	San Francisco 49ers	**L** 30–27	0–1	56,782
2	September 9	at Atlanta Falcons	**W** 27–24 (OT)	1–1	49,878
3	September 16	at **Tampa Bay Buccaneers**	**L** 21–17	1–2	44,560
4	September 23	**Minnesota Vikings**	**L** 29–28	1–3	57,511
5	September 30	at San Diego Chargers	**L** 27–24	1–4	53,509
6	October 7	Denver Broncos	**L** 28–7	1–5	55,836
7	October 14	**Tampa Bay Buccaneers**	**W** 13–7 (OT)	2–5	44,308
8	October 21	at **Minnesota Vikings**	**W** 16–14	3–5	57,953
9	October 28	at **Green Bay Packers**	**L** 41–9	3–6	54,289
10	November 4	Philadelphia Eagles	**T** 23–23 (OT)	3–6–1	59,141
11	November 11	at Washington Redskins	**L** 28–14	3–7–1	50,212
12	November 18	at **Chicago Bears**	**L** 16–14	3–8–1	54,911
13	November 22	**Green Bay Packers**	**W** 31–28	4–8–1	63,698
14	December 2	at Seattle Seahawks	**L** 38–17	4–9–1	62,441
15	December 10	Los Angeles Raiders	**L** 24–3	4–10–1	66,710
16	December 16	**Chicago Bears**	**L** 30–13	4–11–1	53,252
Note: Intra-divisional opponents are in **bold** text.

== Game summaries ==
=== Week 1 (Sunday, September 2, 1984): vs. San Francisco 49ers ===
Week One: San Francisco 49ers at Detroit Lions

Quarter	1	2	3	4	Total
49ers (1–0)	7	7	3	13	30
Lions (0–1)	7	6	7	7	27

at Pontiac Silverdome • Pontiac, Michigan

- Date: September 2, 1984
- Game time: 1:00 p.m. EDT
- Game weather: indoors
- Game attendance: 56,782
- Referee: Bob Frederic
- TV announcers (CBS): Tom Brookshier (play-by-play) and Wayne Walker (color commentator)
- Pro-Football-Reference.com

Team	Category	Player	Statistics
SF	Passing	Joe Montana	16/25, 188 YDS, 1 TD
SF	Rushing	Wendell Tyler	16 CAR, 87 YDS, 2 TDs
SF	Receiving	Freddie Solomon	4 REC, 61 YDS
DET	Passing	Gary Danielson	17/24, 177 YDS, 2 TDs
DET	Rushing	Billy Sims	17 CAR, 69 YDS, 1 TD
DET	Receiving	Leonard Thompson	3 REC, 58 YDS, 1 TD

Scoring summary

Quarter	Time	Drive			Team	Scoring information	Score	
Quarter	Time	Plays	Yards	TOP	Team	Scoring information	SF	DET
1	4:50				Lions	Sims 2-yard touchdown run, Murray kick good	0	7
1	0:00				49ers	Monroe 5-yard touchdown reception from Montana, Wersching kick good	7	7
2	11:07				Lions	39-yard field goal by Murray	7	10
2	5:01				49ers	Tyler 2-yard touchdown run, Wersching kick good	14	10
2	0:03				Lions	43-yard field goal by Murray	14	13
3	6:36				Lions	Jones 2-yard touchdown reception from Danielson, Murray kick good	14	20
3	0:50				49ers	42-yard field goal by Wersching	17	20
4	10:29				49ers	53-yard field goal by Wersching	20	20
4	8:25				49ers	Tyler 9-yard touchdown run, Wersching kick good	27	20
4	5:01				Lions	Thompson 49-yard touchdown reception from Danielson, Murray kick good	27	27
4	0:04				49ers	22-yard field goal by Wersching	30	27
"TOP" = time of possession. For other American football terms, see Glossary of American football.							30	27

- Point spread: 49ers by 2½
- Over/under: 43.0 (over)
- Time of game:

49ers	Game statistics	Lions
24	First downs	19
32–124	Rushes–yards	28–132
188	Passing yards	177
16–25–0	Passes	17–24–0
2–14	Sacked–yards	2–11
174	Net passing yards	166
298	Total yards	298
198	Return yards	98
2–45.5	Punts	4–44.0
2–1	Fumbles–lost	0–0
2–32	Penalties–yards	6–45
30:44	Time of Possession	29:16

=== Week 2: at Atlanta Falcons ===
Quarter	1	2	3	4	OT	Total
Lions	10	7	7	0	3	27
Falcons	0	10	7	7	0	24

at Atlanta–Fulton County Stadium, Atlanta, Georgia

- Date: Sunday, September 9
- Game time: 1:00 p.m.
- Game weather: 70 °F or 21.1 °C, wind 10 miles per hour (16 km/h; 8.7 kn)
- Referee: Fred Silva
- Pro-Football-Reference.com

Game information

First quarter

- Lions – Billy Sims 9 yard run (Eddie Murray kick) – Lions 7–0
- Lions – Eddie Murray 46 yard field goal – Lions 10–0

Second quarter

- Lions – David Lewis 11 yard pass from Gary Danielson (Eddie Murray kick) – Lions 17–0
- Falcons – Gerald Riggs 1 yard run (Mick Luckhurst kick) – Lions 17–7
- Falcons – Mick Luckhurst 51 yard field goal – Lions 17–10

Third quarter

- Falcons – Billy Johnson 45 yard pass from Steve Bartkowski (Mick Luckhurst kick) – Tie 17–17
- Lions – Leonard Thompson 11 yard pass from Gary Danielson (Eddie Murray kick) – Lions 24–17

Fourth quarter

- Falcons – Stacey Bailey 29 yard pass from Steve Bartkowski (Mick Luckhurst kick) – Tie 24–24

Overtime

- Lions – Eddie Murray 48 yard field goal – Lions 27–24

Lions

- Gary Danielson
  21/32, 250 Yds, 2 TD, 2 INT
- Billy Sims
  23 Rush, 140 Yds, TD
- David Lewis
  4 Rec, 68 Yds, TD

Falcons

- Steve Bartkowski
  24/28, 299 yds, 2 TD
- Gerald Riggs
  19 Rush, 78 Yds, TD
- Billy Johnson
  8 Rec, 116 Yds, TD

==== Week 14: at Seattle Seahawks ====
Quarter	1	2	3	4	Total
Lions	3	14	0	0	17
Seahawks	7	14	0	17	38

at Kingdome, Seattle, Washington

- Date: December 2
- Game time: 1:02pm local
- Game weather: indoors
- Game attendance: 62,441
- Referee: Red Cashion
- TV announcers (CBS): Jim Hill and John Dockery
- Gamebook

Game information

First quarter

- SEA – Steve Largent 3-yard pass from Dave Krieg (Norm Johnson kick), 10:44 (SEA 7–0)
- DET – Eddie Murray 45-yard field goal, 14:51 (SEA 7–3)

Second quarter

- DET – Ken Jenkins 25-yard run (Eddie Murray kick), 1:59 (DET 10–7)
- SEA – Steve Largent 13-yard pass from Dave Krieg (Norm Johnson kick), 5:24 (SEA 14–10)
- DET – James Jones 15-yard pass from Gary Danielson (Eddie Murray kick), 11:51 (DET 17–14)
- SEA – Daryl Turner 4-yard pass from Dave Krieg (Norm Johnson kick), 14:24 (SEA 21–17)

Third quarter

- No scoring plays

Fourth quarter

- SEA – Daryl Turner 51-yard pass from Dave Krieg (Norm Johnson kick), 1:43 (SEA 28–17)
- SEA – Norm Johnson 36-yard field goal, 5:06 (SEA 31–17)
- SEA – Mike Tice 5-yard pass from Dave Krieg (Norm Johnson kick), 8:03 (SEA 38–17)

Top passers

- DET – Gary Danielson: 11/20, 117 yds, 1 TD, 2 INT
- SEA – Dave Krieg: 27/38, 294 yds, 5 TD, 1 INT

Top rushers

- DET – Ken Jenkins: 12 car, 73 yds, 1 TD
- SEA – David Hughes: 7 car, 46 yds

Top receivers

- DET – James Jones: 6 rec, 42 yds, 1 TD
- SEA – Steve Largent: 8 rec, 104 yds, 2 TD

Team – pass – rush – total – to

- DET – 139 – 108 – 247 – 2
- SEA – 275 – 113 – 388 – 2

== Standings ==
NFC Central
	W	L	T	PCT	DIV	CONF	PF	PA	STK
Chicago Bears^{(3)}	10	6	0	.625	7–1	8–4	325	248	W1
Green Bay Packers	8	8	0	.500	5–3	8–4	390	309	W3
Tampa Bay Buccaneers	6	10	0	.375	3–5	5–9	335	380	W2
Detroit Lions	4	11	1	.281	3–5	4–7–1	283	408	L3
Minnesota Vikings	3	13	0	.188	2–6	3–9	276	484	L6
