= 1986 Minnesota Vikings season =

NFL team season

- General manager: Mike Lynn
- Head coach: Jerry Burns
- Home stadium: Metrodome

Results
- Record: 9–7
- Division place: 2nd NFC Central
- Playoffs: Did not qualify
- All-Pros: QB Tommy Kramer (2nd team)
- Pro Bowlers: S Joey Browner; TE Steve Jordan; QB Tommy Kramer

Uniform
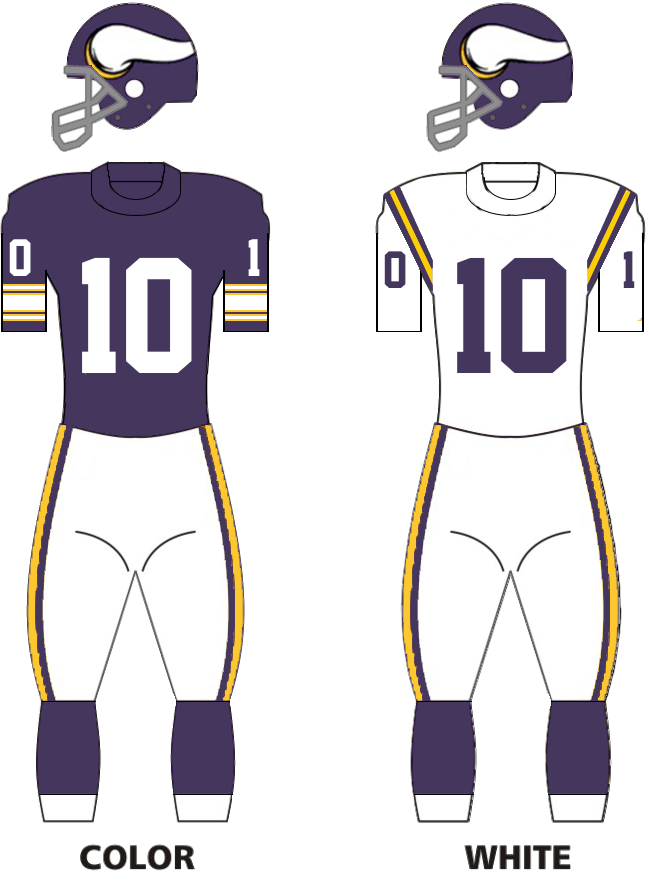

The 1986 season was the Minnesota Vikings' 26th season in the National Football League, and their first with former offensive coordinator Jerry Burns as head coach, following the departure of Bud Grant at the end of the previous season.

Although the Vikings finished with a 9–7 record (a two-game improvement from their 7–9 record from 1985) for their first winning season in a full 16-game season since 1980, they missed the playoffs for the fourth consecutive season.

== Offseason ==
=== 1986 draft ===
1986 Minnesota Vikings Draft
Draft order		Player name	Position	College	Notes
Round	Selection	Player name	Position	College	Notes
1	8	Traded to the San Diego Chargers (Note: The Vikings traded a first- and a third-round selection (8th and 66th overall) to the Chargers in exange for a first- and a second-round selection (14th and 44th overall).)			
1	14	Gerald Robinson	Defensive end	Auburn	From Packers, via Chargers
2	40	Traded to the Miami Dolphins (Note: The Vikings traded a second-round selection (40th overall) and LB Robin Sendlein to the Dolphins in exange for WR Anthony Carter.)			
2	44	Traded to the New York Giants (Note: The Vikings traded two second-round selections (44th and 53rd overall) to the Giants in exange for OT Gary Zimmerman.)			From Chargers
2	53	Traded to the New York Giants			From Raiders (Note: The Vikings traded LB Brad Van Pelt to the Raiders in exange for a second-round selection (53rd overall) and a 1985 sixth-round selection (164th overall).)
3	66	Traded to the San Diego Chargers			
4	93	Joe Phillips	Defensive tackle	SMU	
5	120	Hassan Jones	Wide receiver	Florida State	
6	147	Thomas Rooks	Running back	Illinois	
7	179	Carl Hilton	Tight end	Houston	
8	206	Gary Shippang	Offensive tackle	West Chester	
9	232	Mike Slaton	Cornerback	South Dakota	
10	259	Joe Cormier	Wide receiver	USC	
11	286	John Armstrong	Wide receiver	Richmond	
12	318	Jesse Solomon	Linebacker	Florida State	

== Staff ==
1986 Minnesota Vikings staff
Front office: President – Max Winter; General manager – Mike Lynn; Administrative assistant – Bob Hollway; Head coaches: Head coach – Jerry Burns; Offensive coaches: Offensive coordinator – Bob Schnelker; Running backs – Marc Trestman; Receivers – Dick Rehbein; Offensive line – John Michels	Defensive coaches: Defensive coordinator – Floyd Peters; Defensive line – Paul Wiggin; Linebackers – Monte Kiffin; Defensive backs – Pete Carroll; Special teams coaches: Special teams/ Tight ends coach – Tom Batta

== Roster ==
1986 Minnesota Vikings roster
Quarterbacks (QB): 9 Tommy Kramer; 11 Wade Wilson; Running backs (RB): 46 Alfred Anderson; 23 Ted Brown; 20 Darrin Nelson; 36 Allen Rice; Wide receivers (WR): 81 Anthony Carter; 80 Jim Gustafson; 84 Hassan Jones; 87 Leo Lewis; Tight ends (TE): 82 Carl Hilton; 83 Steve Jordan; 86 Mike Mularkey	Offensive linemen (OL): 51 Jim Hough G; 72 Dave Huffman G/T; 76 Tim Irwin T; 63 Kirk Lowdermilk C; 68 Curtis Rouse G; 67 Dennis Swilley C; 66 Terry Tausch G; 65 Gary Zimmerman T; Defensive linemen (DL): 79 Doug Martin DE; 75 Keith Millard DT; 77 Mark Mullaney DE; 96 Tim Newton DT; 91 Joe Phillips DT; 95 Gerald Robinson DE; 74 Mike Stensrud DT	Linebackers (LB): 58 Walker Lee Ashley MLB; 56 Chris Doleman OLB; 99 David Howard OLB; 57 Chris Martin OLB; 53 Jeff Schuh OLB; 54 Jesse Solomon OLB; 55 Scott Studwell MLB; Defensive backs (DB): 21 Rufus Bess CB; 47 Joey Browner SS; 26 David Evans CB; 41 Neal Guggemos SS; 30 Issiac Holt CB; 44 John Harris FS; 39 Carl Lee CB; 37 Willie Teal CB; Special teams (ST): 8 Greg Coleman P; 1 Chuck Nelson K	Reserve: 27 Mike Lush S (IR); 71 Mark MacDonald G (IR); 88 Buster Rhymes WR (IR); 85 Sammy White WR (IR); Rookies in italics

== Preseason ==
Week	Date	Opponent	Result	Record	Venue	Attendance
1	August 9	Miami Dolphins	W 30–16	1–0	Hubert H. Humphrey Metrodome	52,865
2	August 16	Denver Broncos	W 29–27	2–0	Hubert H. Humphrey Metrodome	53,193
3	August 22	at Seattle Seahawks	L 17–27	2–1	Kingdome	57,730
4	August 30	at Indianapolis Colts	W 23–20 (OT)	3–1	Hoosier Dome	57,969

== Regular season ==
=== Schedule ===
Week	Date	Opponent	Result	Record	Venue	Attendance
1	September 7	Detroit Lions	L 10–13	0–1	Hubert H. Humphrey Metrodome	54,851
2	September 14	at Tampa Bay Buccaneers	W 23–10	1–1	Tampa Stadium	34,579
3	September 21	Pittsburgh Steelers	W 31–7	2–1	Hubert H. Humphrey Metrodome	56,795
4	September 28	Green Bay Packers	W 42–7	3–1	Hubert H. Humphrey Metrodome	60,478
5	October 5	at Chicago Bears	L 0–23	3–2	Soldier Field	63,921
6	October 12	at San Francisco 49ers	W 27–24 (OT)	4–2	Candlestick Park	58,637
7	October 19	Chicago Bears	W 23–7	5–2	Hubert H. Humphrey Metrodome	62,851
8	October 26	Cleveland Browns	L 20–23	5–3	Hubert H. Humphrey Metrodome	59,133
9	November 2	at Washington Redskins	L 38–44 (OT)	5–4	Robert F. Kennedy Memorial Stadium	51,928
10	November 9	at Detroit Lions	W 24–10	6–4	Silverdome	53,725
11	November 16	New York Giants	L 20–22	6–5	Hubert H. Humphrey Metrodome	62,003
12	November 23	at Cincinnati Bengals	L 20–24	6–6	Riverfront Stadium	53,003
13	November 30	Tampa Bay Buccaneers	W 45–13	7–6	Hubert H. Humphrey Metrodome	56,235
14	December 7	at Green Bay Packers	W 32–6	8–6	Lambeau Field	47,637
15	December 14	at Houston Oilers	L 10–23	8–7	Astrodome	32,738
16	December 21	New Orleans Saints	W 33–17	9–7	Hubert H. Humphrey Metrodome	51,209

=== Game summaries ===
==== Week 1: vs Detroit Lions ====
Week 1: Detroit Lions at Minnesota Vikings – Game summary

Quarter	1	2	3	4	Total
Lions	0	7	3	3	13
Vikings	3	0	0	7	10

at Hubert H. Humphrey Metrodome, Minneapolis, Minnesota

- Date: September 7
- Game time: 1:00 p.m.
- Game weather: None (indoor stadium)
- Game attendance: 54,851
- Referee: Red Cashion
- TV announcers (CBS): Tom Brookshier and Dick Vermeil
- Box Score, Box Score

Game information

First quarter

- MIN – Chuck Nelson 35-yard field goal, 3:38. Vikings 3–0.

Second quarter

- DET – James Jones 2-yard run (Eddie Murray kick), 1:56. Lions 7–3.

Third quarter

- DET – Eddie Murray 33-yard field goal, 2:01. Lions 10–3.

Fourth quarter

- DET – Eddie Murray 44-yard field goal, 9:05. Lions 13–3.
- MIN – Jim Gustafson 5-yard pass from Tommy Kramer (Chuck Nelson kick), 0:03. Lions 13–10.

Top passers

- DET – Eric Hipple – 8/15, 95 yards, INT
- MIN – Tommy Kramer – 21/38, 223 yards, TD, INT

Top rushers

- DET – James Jones – 36 rushes, 174 yards, TD
- MIN – Darrin Nelson – 11 rushes, 58 yards

Top receivers

- DET – Leonard Thompson – 3 receptions, 40 yards
- MIN – Darrin Nelson – 6 receptions, 74 yards

==== Week 8: vs Cleveland Browns ====
Week 8: Cleveland Browns at Minnesota Vikings – Game summary

Quarter	1	2	3	4	Total
Browns	3	0	7	13	23
Vikings	3	14	3	0	20

at Hubert H. Humphrey Metrodome, Minneapolis, Minnesota

- Date: October 26
- Game time: 1:00 p.m.
- Game weather: None (indoor stadium)
- Game attendance: 59,133
- Referee: Tom Dooley
- TV announcers (NBC): Charlie Jones and Jimmy Cefalo
- Box Score, Box Score

Game information

First quarter

- MIN – Chuck Nelson 33-yard field goal, 6:55. Vikings 3–0.
- CLE – Matt Bahr 52-yard field goal, 3:16. Tie 3–3.

Second quarter

- MIN – Darrin Nelson 5-yard run (Chuck Nelson kick), 5:00. Vikings 10–3.
- MIN – Anthony Carter 8-yard pass from Tommy Kramer (Chuck Nelson kick), 0:24. Vikings 17–3.

Third quarter

- CLE – Felix Wright 30-yard blocked punt return (Matt Bahr kick), 12:40. Vikings 17–10.
- MIN – Chuck Nelson 32-yard field goal, 3:29. Vikings 20–10.

Fourth quarter

- CLE – Matt Bahr 19-yard field goal, 13:13. Vikings 20–13.
- CLE – Curtis Dickey 17-yard run (Matt Bahr kick), 3:23. Tie 20–20.
- CLE – Matt Bahr 22-yard field goal, 1:46. Browns 23–20.

Top passers

- CLE – Bernie Kosar – 9/18, 101 yards, TD
- MIN – Tommy Kramer – 18/35, 261 yards, TD, INT

Top rushers

- CLE – Curtis Dickey – 19 rushes, 106 yards, TD
- MIN – Darrin Nelson – 22 rushes, 118 yards, TD

Top receivers

- CLE – Reggie Langhorne – 2 receptions, 37 yards
- MIN – Allen Rice – 4 receptions, 71 yards

=== Standings ===
NFC Central
	W	L	T	PCT	DIV	CONF	PF	PA	STK
Chicago Bears^{(2)}	14	2	0	.875	7–1	10–2	352	187	W7
Minnesota Vikings	9	7	0	.563	6–2	8–4	398	273	W1
Detroit Lions	5	11	0	.313	3–5	4–8	277	326	L4
Green Bay Packers	4	12	0	.250	3–5	3–9	254	418	L1
Tampa Bay Buccaneers	2	14	0	.125	1–7	1–13	239	473	L7

== Statistics ==
=== Team leaders ===
Category	Player(s)	Value
Passing yards	Tommy Kramer	3,000
Passing touchdowns	Tommy Kramer	24
Rushing yards	Darrin Nelson	793
Rushing touchdowns	Ted Brown; Darrin Nelson	4
Receiving yards	Steve Jordan	859
Receiving touchdowns	Anthony Carter	7
Points	Chuck Nelson	110
Kickoff return yards	Rufus Bess	705
Punt return yards	Rufus Bess	162
Tackles	Jesse Solomon	96
Sacks	Keith Millard	10.5
Interceptions	Issiac Holt	8
Forced fumbles	Chris Doleman	2

=== League rankings ===
Category	Total yards	Yards per game	NFL rank (out of 28)
Passing offense	3,913	244.6	5th
Rushing offense	1,738	108.6	16th
Total offense	5,651	353.2	4th
Passing defense	3,216	201.0	13th
Rushing defense	1,796	112.3	13th
Total defense	5,012	313.3	11th

== Awards and records ==
- On August 2, Fran Tarkenton was inducted into the Pro Football Hall of Fame in Canton, Ohio. He was the first player inducted who was primarily a Minnesota Viking during his career.
- Tommy Kramer, the NFL passer rating leader, was named NFL Comeback Player of the Year by Pro Football Weekly.
