= 1985 USFL draft =

1985 USFL Draft

General information
- Date: January 3, 1985
- Location: Grand Hyatt Hotel, New York

Overview
- 221 total selections in 15 rounds
- League: USFL
- First selection: Jerry Rice, WR; Birmingham Stallions

The 1985 USFL Draft was the third collegiate draft of the United States Football League (USFL). It took place on January 3, 1985.

Round	Pick #	USFL team	Player	Position	College
1	1	Birmingham Stallions	Jerry Rice	Wide receiver	Mississippi Valley State
1	2	Arizona Outlaws	Tory Nixon	Cornerback	San Diego State
1	3	San Antonio Gunslingers	Issiac Holt	Cornerback	Alcorn State
1	4	Denver Gold	John Nevens	Linebacker	Cal State Fullerton
1	5	New Jersey Generals	Jesse Penn	Linebacker	Virginia Tech
1	6	Houston Gamblers	Raphel Cherry	Safety	Hawaii
1	7	Oakland Invaders	Bob Standifer	Defensive end	Tennessee Chattanooga
1	8	Tampa Bay Bandits	Don Anderson	Cornerback	Purdue
1	9	Houston Gamblers	Mark Traynowicz	Offensive guard	Nebraska
1	10	Birmingham Stallions	Kevin Allen	Offensive tackle	Indiana
1	11	New Jersey Generals	Lee Rouson	Running back	Colorado
1	12	Tampa Bay Bandits	Mike Gann	Defensive end	Notre Dame
1	13	Arizona Outlaws	Ronnie Washington	Linebacker	Louisiana at Monroe
1	14	Baltimore Stars	Chris Burkett	Wide receiver	Jackson State
1	15	Arizona Outlaws	Sean Thomas	Safety	TCU
1	16	Los Angeles Express	Steve Sewell	Running back	Oklahoma
1	17	Los Angeles Express	James Maness	Wide receiver	TCU
2	18	Orlando Renegades	Lomas Brown	Offensive tackle	UCLA
2	19	Jacksonville Bulls	Mike Pendleton	Cornerback	Indiana
2	20	New Jersey Generals	Peter Muldoon	Quarterback	Holy Cross
2	21	Baltimore Stars	Wayne Davis	Cornerback	Indiana State
2	22	Portland Breakers	Daryl Smith	Cornerback	North Alabama
2	23	Denver Gold	Brad Calip	Wide receiver	East Central
2	24	San Antonio Gunslingers	Greg Greely	Cornerback	Nicholls State
2	25	Oakland Invaders	Timothy Williams	Cornerback	North Carolina A&T State
2	26	Houston Gamblers	Andre Harris	Cornerback	Minnesota
2	27	Jacksonville Bulls	Mike Hamby	Defensive end	Utah State
2	28	Tampa Bay Bandits	Cam Jacobs	Linebacker	Kentucky
2	29	Arizona Outlaws	Darrell Warden	Linebacker	Stephen F. Austin State
2	30	Baltimore Stars	Roger Caron	Offensive tackle	Harvard
2	31	New Jersey Generals	Gene Lake	Running back	Delaware State
2	32	Birmingham Stallions	Tracey Mack	Linebacker	Missouri
3	33	Orlando Renegades	George Adams	RB	Kentucky
3	34	Portland Breakers	Stacy Robinson	WR	North Dakota State
3	35	New Jersey Generals	George Shorthose	WR	Missouri
3	36	Memphis Showboats	Henry Williams	WR	East Carolina
3	37	Portland Breakers	Robert Brannon	DE	Arkansas
3	38	Los Angeles Express	Kevin Williams	DB	Iowa State
3	39	Orlando Renegades	Andre Reed	WR	Kutztown
3	40	Houston Gamblers	Ladell Wills	LB	Jackson State
3	41	Tampa Bay Bandits	Carlton Walker	G	Utah
3	42	New Jersey Generals	Robert Anae	G	Brigham Young
3	43	Baltimore Stars	Mike Heaven	DB	Illinois
3	44	Baltimore Stars	Hal Garner	LB	Utah State
3	45	Los Angeles Express	Jay Lawson	DB	UC Davis
4	46	Orlando Renegades	Kerry Glenn	DB	Minnesota
4	47	Jacksonville Bulls	Mike Kelley	C	Notre Dame
4	48	Birmingham Stallions	Thad McFadden	WR	Wisconsin
4	49	Arizona Outlaws	Mike Smith	DB	Texas-El Paso
4	50	Portland Breakers	James Johnson	LB	San Diego State
4	51	Denver Gold	Calvin Loveall	DB	Idaho
4	52	Oakland Invaders	Reggie Langhorne	WR	Elizabeth City State
4	53	Houston Gamblers	Dan Remsberg	T	Abilene Christian
4	54	Memphis Showboats	Walter Stanley	WR	Colorado Mesa
4	55	Arizona Outlaws	Steve Morgan	RB	Toledo
4	56	Tampa Bay Bandits	James Harbour	WR	Mississippi
4	57	Arizona Outlaws	Rich Moran	T	San Diego State
4	58	Baltimore Stars	Stefon Adams	WR	East Carolina
4	59	Birmingham Stallions	Kevin Murphy	LB	Holy Cross
4	60	Memphis Showboats	Mike Prior	DB	Illinois State
4	61	Houston Gamblers	Dave Heffernan	T	Miami (Florida)
5	62	Arizona Outlaws	Dan Coleman	DT	Murray State
5	63	Birmingham Stallions	Steve Buxton	T	Indiana State
5	64	Los Angeles Express	Anthony Tuggle	DB	Nicholls State
5	65	Portland Breakers	Charles Bennett	DT	Louisiana-Lafayette
5	66	Orlando Renegades	Mark Weiler	LB	Indiana
5	67	Oakland Invaders	Darnell Wall	DE	Virginia Union
5	68	Tampa Bay Bandits	Ron Sally	QB	Duke
5	69	Houston Gamblers	Jay Novacek	TE	Wyoming
5	70	New Jersey Generals	Ashley Lee	DB	Virginia Tech
5	71	Tampa Bay Bandits	Albert Myres	DB	Tulsa
5	72	Birmingham Stallions	Paul Calhoun	DB	Kentucky
5	73	Baltimore Stars	Tony Davis	TE	Missouri
5	74	Baltimore Stars	James Cofer	LB	Knoxville
5	75	Baltimore Stars	Jim Evans	WR	East Central
6	76	Orlando Renegades	Louis Cooper	LB	Western Carolina
6	77	Oakland Invaders	Mike Kenealy	DB	Central Michigan
6	78	Baltimore Stars	Bruce Collie	OT	Texas-Arlington
6	79	Portland Breakers	Derek Bunch	LB	Michigan State
6	80	Los Angeles Express	Judious Lewis	WR	Arkansas State
6	81	Oakland Invaders	Don Kindt	TE	Wisconsin-LaCrosse
6	82	Houston Gamblers	Curtis DeBardlabon	WR	Mississippi Valley State
6	83	Tampa Bay Bandits	Jeff Smith	DE	Kentucky
6	84	Baltimore Stars	Mark Kelso	DB	William & Mary
6	85	New Jersey Generals	Chas Fox	WR	Furman
6	86	Arizona Outlaws	Kevin Kott	QB	Eastern New Mexico
6	87	Baltimore Stars	Jess Atkinson	K	Maryland
6	88	Arizona Outlaws	Juan Johnson	WR	Langston
6	89	Orlando Renegades	Pete Roth	RB	Northern Illinois
7	90	Orlando Renegades	Glen Jones	DB	Norfolk State
7	91	Jacksonville Bulls	Rod Lyles	LB	Michigan
7	92	Birmingham Stallions	Jim Covington	T	Carson-Newman
7	93	Portland Breakers	Ricky Nichols	WR	East Carolina
7	94	Denver Gold	Doug Mikolas	DT	Portland State
7	95	Oakland Invaders	Tom Toth	T	Western Michigan
7	96	Los Angeles Express	John Warren	DB	Virginia Union
7	97	Los Angeles Express	Lenson Staples	LB	Missouri
7	98	San Antonio Gunslingers	Robert Lewis	RB	Texas Tech
7	99	Tampa Bay Bandits	Kirk Perry	DB	Louisville
7	100	Birmingham Stallions	Alex Moyer	LB	Northwestern
7	101	Baltimore Stars	Jeff Smith	RB	Nebraska
7	102	Denver Gold	Mark Pembrook	DB	Fullerton State
8	103	Orlando Renegades	Mark Dowdell	TE	Bowling Green State
8	104	Birmingham Stallions	Vince Thompson	DT	Missouri Western State
8	105	Oakland Invaders	Bruce King	RB	Purdue
8	106	Baltimore Stars	Jim Morrissey	LB	Michigan State
8	107	Denver Gold	Fred Banks	WR	Liberty
8	108	Oakland Invaders	Arnold Brown	DB	North Carolina Central
8	109	Arizona Outlaws	Mark Napolitan	C	Michigan State
8	110	Tampa Bay Bandits	Joe Jones	TE	Virginia Tech
8	111	Birmingham Stallions	Oliver White	TE	Kentucky
8	112	New Jersey Generals	Lonnie Young	DB	Michigan State
8	113	Arizona Outlaws	Jacque Robinson	RB	Washington
8	114	Orlando Renegades	Dale Hatcher	P	Clemson
8	115	Arizona Outlaws	Dennis Maher	T	Washington
8	116	Denver Gold	Robert Curry	T	Missouri
9	117	Orlando Renegades	Curtis Adams	RB	Central Michigan
9	118	Jacksonville Bulls	Ralf Mojsiejenko	K	Michigan State
9	119	Tampa Bay Bandits	Jay Wilson	C	Appalachian State
9	120	Memphis Showboats	Ron Davenport	FB	Louisville
9	121	Portland Breakers	Eric Bailey	TE	Kansas State
9	122	Memphis Showboats	Cleon Brown	DT	Central Arkansas
9	123	Oakland Invaders	David Pack	WR	Sewanee
9	124	Orlando Renegades	Chris Babyar	G	Illinois
9	125	Houston Gamblers	Lee Johnson	K	Brigham Young
9	126	Birmingham Stallions	Royce Fentress	LB	Elon
9	127	New Jersey Generals	Herman Fontenot	WR	Louisiana State
9	128	Tampa Bay Bandits	Allen Campbell	LB	Salem
9	129	Arizona Outlaws	Bob Otto	DE	Idaho State
9	130	Baltimore Stars	Terry Lewis	DB	Michigan State
9	131	New Jersey Generals	Tony Edwards	LB	Texas
9	132	Denver Gold	Rich Miano	DB	Hawaii
10	133	Orlando Renegades	Clarence Kelly	DB	Akron
10	134	Memphis Showboats	Dennis Williams	FB	Furman
10	135	Portland Breakers	Herb Welch	DB	UCLA
10	136	Portland Breakers	Larry Williams	T	Notre Dame
10	137	Orlando Renegades	Joe Kelly	WR	Vanderbilt
10	138	Portland Breakers	Floyd Layher	T	Pacific
10	139	Houston Gamblers	Trevor Matich	C	Brigham Young
10	140	New Jersey Generals	Kyle Clawson	DE	Kansas State
10	141	Tampa Bay Bandits	Kevin Brooks	DE	Michigan
10	142	Birmingham Stallions	Theoriea Ward	DT	Georgia Southern
10	143	Arizona Outlaws	Barry Wood	T	Connecticut
10	144	Baltimore Stars	Dave Burnette	DE	Central Arkansas
10	145	Oakland Invaders	Dale Dorning	DE	Oregon
10	146	Tampa Bay Bandits	Byron Jones	DT	Tulsa
11	147	Orlando Renegades	Leon Gonzalez	WR	Bethune-Cookman
11	148	Jacksonville Bulls	Phil Forney	LB	East Tennessee State
11	149	Baltimore Stars	Troy Bodine	QB	Cincinnati
11	150	Tampa Bay Bandits	Scott Barrows	G	West Virginia
11	151	Portland Breakers	Daryl Hill	DB	UC Davis
11	152	Denver Gold	Gill Stegall	WR	Harding
11	153	Oakland Invaders	Jim Bowman	DB	Central Michigan
11	154	Los Angeles Express	Kevin Murphy	LB	Oklahoma
11	155	Houston Gamblers	Mark Lee	LB	Arkansas
11	156	Tampa Bay Bandits	Doug Pritchett	DB	Louisville
15	157	Birmingham Stallions	Andy Baranek	QB	East Stroudsburg
11	158	Arizona Outlaws	Larry Addison	WR	Alabama A&M
11	159	Baltimore Stars	Ricky Dirks	RB	Texas A&M-Commerce
11	160	Oakland Invaders	Darren Wilson	RB	Hampton
11	161	Baltimore Stars	Dwayne McMullen	WR	Minnesota
11	162	Tampa Bay Bandits	Jim Browne	RB	Boston College
11	163	San Antonio Gunslingers	Alan Veingrad	T	Texas A&M-Commerce
12	164	Birmingham Stallions	Tommy Perkins	DT	Tennessee State
12	165	Houston Gamblers	Keith Edwards	RB	Vanderbilt
12	166	Memphis Showboats	Keith Lester	TE	Murray State
12	167	Houston Gamblers	Garry Kimble	DB	Sam Houston State
12	168	Portland Breakers	Paul Lavine	LB	Utah State
12	169	Los Angeles Express	Jon Cade	DE	Louisville
12	170	Tampa Bay Bandits	Kevin Langford	G	Louisiana State
12	171	Houston Gamblers	Mike Thompson	LB	North Texas
12	172	Tampa Bay Bandits	Greg Harraka	G	Maryland
2	173	Tampa Bay Bandits	Bob Molle	DT	Simon Fraser
12	174	Baltimore Stars	Carl Keever	LB	Boise State
12	175	Birmingham Stallions	Andy Cheatham	G	Clemson
13	176	Orlando Renegades	Mark Vonder Haar	T	Minnesota
13	177	Jacksonville Bulls	Chris Smith	RB	Notre Dame
13	178	Memphis Showboats	Larry Stephenson	QB	West Alabama
13	179	Portland Breakers	Neil Harris	DB	Nebraska
13	180	Denver Gold	Dave Toub	C	Texas-El Paso
13	181	Oakland Invaders	Kevin Belcher	OT	Wisconsin
13	182	Los Angeles Express	Keli McGregor	TE	Colorado State
13	183	Houston Gamblers	Dan Sharp	TE	Texas Christian
13	184	San Antonio Gunslingers	Clyde Johnson	DB	Kansas
13	185	Tampa Bay Bandits	Bob Mocarski	T	Boston University
13	186	Birmingham Stallions	Jim Boyle	DB	Holy Cross
13	187	Arizona Outlaws	Lionel Vital	RB	Nicholls State
13	188	Baltimore Stars	Dave Edwards	DB	Illinois
14	189	Orlando Renegades	Keith Cruise	T	Northwestern
14	190	Jacksonville Bulls	Mike Jones	RB	Tulane
14	191	Memphis Showboats	Tiger Greene	DB	Western Carolina
14	192	San Antonio Gunslingers	Rick Donnelly	P	Wyoming
14	193	Portland Breakers	Andre Pinesett	LB	Fullerton State
14	194	Denver Gold	Nate Harris	WR	Tulsa
14	195	Los Angeles Express	Scott Napier	RB	Redlands
14	196	Oakland Invaders	Angelo Snipes	DB	West Georgia
14	197	Houston Gamblers	Mike McCashland	DB	Nebraska
14	198	Tampa Bay Bandits	Vince Bean	WR	Michigan
14	199	Birmingham Stallions	Alvin Wright	DT	Jacksonville State
14	200	New Jersey Generals	Joe Shield	QB	Trinity (Connecticut)
14	201	Arizona Outlaws	Kevin McCall	RB	Oregon
14	202	Baltimore Stars	Dave Baran	C	UCLA
14	203	Memphis Showboats	Billy Leeson	T	Virginia Tech
15	204	Orlando Renegades	Mike Golic	DT	Notre Dame
15	205	Jacksonville Bulls	Damian Johnson	T	Kansas State
15	206	San Antonio Gunslingers	Scott Forester	C	Texas State
15	207	San Antonio Gunslingers	David Wood	WR	West Texas A&M
15	208	Portland Breakers	Brian Campbell	LB	Nevada-Las Vegas
15	209	Denver Gold	Todd Gerhart	RB	Fullerton State
15	210	Oakland Invaders	William Burse	DE	Kentucky State
15	211	Houston Gamblers	Karl Jordan	DE	Vanderbilt
15	212	Orlando Renegades	Mark Bavaro	TE	Notre Dame
15	213	New Jersey Generals	Harry Newsome	P	Wake Forest
15	214	Tampa Bay Bandits	Paul Lewis	RB	Boston University
15	215	Arizona Outlaws	Dan Fiala	LB	Colorado State
15	216	Baltimore Stars	Bryan Wagner	P	Northridge State
15	217	Birmingham Stallions	Phillip Mack	DT	Lamar
15	218	Portland Breakers	Buddy Funck	QB	New Mexico
15	219	Denver Gold	Fred Hemphill	DB	Hawaii
15	220	Houston Gamblers	Arthur Berry	T	Northwestern State (Louisiana)
15	221	Orlando Renegades	Willard Goff	DT	West Texas A&M

-->
