= Mike Black (punter) =

American football player (born 1961)

No. 11
- Position: Punter

Personal information
- Born: January 18, 1961 (age 65); Glendale, California, U.S.
- Listed height: 6 ft 1 in (1.85 m)
- Listed weight: 197 lb (89 kg)

Career information
- High school: Glendale
- College: Arizona State (1979–1982)
- NFL draft: 1983: 7th round, 181st overall pick

Career history
- Detroit Lions (1983–1986); Minnesota Vikings (1987)*; Detroit Lions (1987)
- * Offseason or practice squad member only

Awards and highlights
- 3× First-team All-Pac-10 (1980–1982)

Career NFL statistics
- Punts: 272
- Punt yards: 11,181
- Longest punt: 63
- Stats at Pro Football Reference

Peter Michael Black (born January 18, 1961) is an American former professional football player who was a punter for five seasons with the Detroit Lions of the National Football League (NFL). He was selected by the Lions in the seventh round of the 1983 NFL draft after playing college football for the Arizona State Sun Devils.

== Early life and college ==
Peter Michael Black was born on January 18, 1961, in Glendale, California. He attended Glendale High School in Glendale.

Black played college football for the Sun Devils of Arizona State University from 1979 to 1982. He punted 55 times for 2,085 yards in 1979, 53 times for 2,299 yards in 1980, 57 times for 2,421 yards in 1981, and 64 times for 2,850 yards in 1982. Black was named first-team All-Pac-10 punter in 1980, 1981 and 1982, averaging 43.4, 42.5 and 44.3 yards per punt respectively in those seasons.

== Professional career ==
Black was selected by the Detroit Lions in the seventh round, with the 181st overall pick, of the 1983 NFL draft. He played in all 16 games during his rookie year in 1983, totaling 71 punts for 2,911 yards. He also appeared in one playoff game that season and punted twice for 73 yards. Black played in all 16 games for the second consecutive season in 1984, punting 76 times for 3,164 yards. He appeared in all 16 games for the third straight year in 1985, punting 73 times for 3,054 yards. Black played in the first nine games of the 1986 season, recording 46 punts for 1,819 yards and a 39.5 average, before being waived and replaced with Jim Arnold.

Black signed with the Minnesota Vikings in 1987. He was released on August 31, 1987.

On September 29, 1987, Black signed with the Lions during the 1987 NFL players strike. He played in one game for the Lions during the 1987 season and punted six times for 233 yards.

== NFL career statistics ==
Legend
**Bold**	Career high

=== Regular season ===
Year	Team	Punting									
Year	Team	GP	Punts	Yds	Net Yds	Lng	Avg	Net Avg	Blk	Ins20	TB
1983	DET	**16**	71	2,911	2,429	60	41.0	33.7	**1**	**17**	**9**
1984	DET	**16**	**76**	**3,164**	2,488	**63**	41.6	32.7	0	13	8
1985	DET	**16**	73	3,054	**2,534**	60	**41.8**	34.7	0	16	5
1986	DET	9	46	1,819	1,469	47	39.5	31.3	**1**	11	5
1987	DET	1	6	233	221	47	38.8	**36.8**	0	1	0
Career		58	272	11,181	9,141	63	41.1	33.4	2	58	27

=== Playoffs ===
Year	Team	Punting									
Year	Team	GP	Punts	Yds	Net Yds	Lng	Avg	Net Avg	Blk	Ins20	TB
1983	DET	1	2	73	53	51	36.5	26.5	0	1	1
Career		1	2	73	53	51	36.5	26.5	0	1	1
