= Leonard Thompson (American football) =

American football player (1952–2021)

No. 39
- Positions: Wide receiver, halfback

Personal information
- Born: July 28, 1952; Oklahoma City, Oklahoma, U.S.
- Died: August 15, 2021 (aged 69); Phoenix, Arizona, U.S.
- Listed height: 5 ft 11 in (1.80 m)
- Listed weight: 192 lb (87 kg)

Career information
- High school: Pueblo (AZ)
- College: Arizona Western (1972-1973); Oklahoma State (1974-1975)
- NFL draft: 1975: 8th round, 194th overall pick

Career history
- Detroit Lions (1975–1986)

Career NFL statistics
- Receptions: 277
- Receiving yards: 4,682
- Receiving TDs: 35
- Rushing attempts: 64
- Rushing yards: 327
- Rushing TDs: 3
- Stats at Pro Football Reference

Leonard Irwin Thompson (July 28, 1952 – August 15, 2021) was an American professional football player who was a wide receiver in the National Football League (NFL), spending his entire career with the Detroit Lions (1975–1986).

Thompson was an eighth-round pick in the 1975 NFL draft out of Oklahoma State. He spent his first five seasons as a backup at halfback and wideout for the Lions (his position at halfback was why he wore #39 even after playing exclusively as a receiver, which is technically outside of the NFL's uniform numbering system [receivers were only limited to wearing numbers between 80 and 89 then]). On December 11, 1977, Thompson blocked a David Lee punt on the Baltimore Colts 21 yard line, returning it 2 yards for a touchdown with 14 seconds left in the game. The clutch play gave the Lions an improbable 13-10 victory.

In 1980, Thompson earned a starting role as wide receiver opposite Freddie Scott. Thompson caught 19 passes for 511 yards and 3 touchdowns. He caught another 214 passes over the next six seasons, including 26 touchdowns. He would lead the Lions in receiving in 1985 with 51 catches, for 736 yards and 5 scores.

Thompson's career ended when the Lions released him before the start of the 1987 season. He played all 12 seasons of his career with the Lions, scoring 39 total touchdowns.

== College career ==
Leonard Thompson played high school football at Pueblo High in Arizona. He attended Arizona Western College before being discovered by Scouts at Oklahoma State, who convinced Thompson to transfer there. Thompson would see his first action at running back for the Cowboys in 1973. Oklahoma State, coached by Jim Stanley, struggled to a 5-4-2 record in 1973. During his first season of action, Thompson carried the ball 90 times for 518 yards and six touchdowns. During his senior season in 1974, Thompson worked both as running back and wide receiver. He carried the ball fewer times in 1974, 33, and scored fewer touchdowns, 3. However, Thompson emerged as a receiver out of the back field, catching five passes for 114 yards and a touchdown. To further show Thompson's athletic skills, he even pass for one touchdown during his senior season.

== Professional career ==
Leonard Thompson was drafted by the Detroit Lions in the eighth round (194th player selected overall) of the 1975 NFL Draft. The same draft produced Doug English, who would go on to a multi-All Pro career for the Lions, but Thompson would play for the franchise longer than any other player drafted by the Lions that year. For the first four seasons of his career, Thompson played in every game, but only occasionally was a starter. Despite starting in only one game for the Lions in 1978, Thompson still caught four touchdown passes that season. The first touchdown pass in his pro career came in the form of a 19-yard pass from quarterback Gary Danielson in the Lions 21-14 loss to the St. Louis Cardinals.

Whereas Thompson began to emerge during the 1980 season, his career year was in 1981. He was a full-time starter for the first time in his pro career, as he hauled in 30 passes for 550 yards and three touchdowns. While the Lions finished 8-8 under head coach Monte Clark, the Lions could not find consistency under center after Danielson was injured. Both Eric Hipple and Jeff Komlo did their best. The Lions lost both Komlo starts and went 6-4 under Hipple, who was in his second year. Despite the Lions instability at quarterback over the next few seasons, Thompson would be a constant for the Lions offense. Thompson caught seven passes for 150 yards in the Lions wild card 31-7 loss to the Washington Redskins, in the post season of the strike shortened season. The Lions won the NFC central the following season with a 9-7 record. They received a first round play, but lost to the San Francisco 49ers in the divisional round. In that game, Thompson caught six passes for 74 yards, but the Lions lost in the last minutes of the game when 49ers quarterback Joe Montana threw a touchdown pass to Freddie Solomon. The following season the Lions tail spun into a 4-11-1 record, despite Thompson catching 50 passes for 773 yards, and the emergence of the speedy Jeff Chadwick at receiver. Thompson had emerged as a favorite target of Hipple's but it was around this time that Thompson began to have issues with his knees. His knees gave him so much trouble, Thompson's participation in practice was limited. It wasn't long before Thompson had to have multiple surgeries on his knees.

In 1986, his final season in the NFL, Thompson caught 25 passes for 320 yards and five touchdowns. However, he would have a shining moment that season. In a nationally televised Monday Night game against the Chicago Bears, catching a touchdown pass from rookie Chuck Long. However, the Bears came back to beat the Lions 16-13. This wasn't the only time Thompson came through in a nationally televised game. In a Thanksgiving contest against the New York Jets in 1985, Thompson caught three touchdown passes from Eric Hipple as the Lions cruised to a 31-20 win.

Thompson's NFL career came to an end when the Lions released him after the preseason in 1987. Thompson ended his career as the Lions all-time leader in touchdown receptions with 35, a mark that was passed by Herman Moore and later by Calvin Johnson, the latter who is now the Lions all-time leader in touchdown receptions. Thompson is now ranked at third with 35.

== NFL career statistics ==
Legend
**Bold**	Career high

=== Regular season ===
Year	Team	Games		Receiving					Rushing				
Year	Team	GP	GS	Rec	Yds	Avg	Lng	TD	Att	Yds	Avg	Lng	TD
1975	DET	14	1	0	0	0.0	0	0	1	-12	-12.0	-12	0
1976	DET	14	1	3	52	17.3	21	0	1	0	0.0	0	0
1977	DET	14	3	7	42	6.0	18	0	**31**	**91**	2.9	16	**1**
1978	DET	**16**	1	10	167	16.7	45	4	1	7	7.0	7	0
1979	DET	15	1	24	451	18.8	82	2	5	24	4.8	16	0
1980	DET	**16**	12	19	511	**26.9**	79	3	6	61	10.2	30	0
1981	DET	**16**	**16**	30	550	18.3	**94**	3	10	75	7.5	21	**1**
1982	DET	9	6	17	328	19.3	70	4	2	16	8.0	13	0
1983	DET	13	12	41	752	18.3	80	3	4	72	**18.0**	**40**	**1**
1984	DET	**16**	15	50	**773**	15.5	66	**6**	3	-7	-2.3	4	0
1985	DET	**16**	13	**51**	736	14.4	48	5	0	0	0.0	0	0
1986	DET	**16**	1	25	320	12.8	36	5	0	0	0.0	0	0
		175	82	277	4,682	16.9	94	35	64	327	5.1	40	3

=== Playoffs ===
Year	Team	Games		Receiving					Rushing				
Year	Team	GP	GS	Rec	Yds	Avg	Lng	TD	Att	Yds	Avg	Lng	TD
1982	DET	**1**	**1**	**7**	**150**	**21.4**	**48**	0	0	0	0.0	0	0
1983	DET	**1**	**1**	6	74	12.3	20	0	**1**	**24**	**24.0**	**24**	0
		2	2	13	224	17.2	48	0	1	24	24.0	24	0
