= Pete Mandley =

American football player (born 1961)

No. 82, 89
- Position: Wide receiver

Personal information
- Born: July 29, 1961 (age 65); Mesa, Arizona, U.S.
- Listed height: 5 ft 10 in (1.78 m)
- Listed weight: 191 lb (87 kg)

Career information
- High school: Westwood (Mesa, Arizona)
- College: Northern Arizona
- NFL draft: 1984: 2nd round, 47th overall pick

Career history
- Detroit Lions (1984–1988); Kansas City Chiefs (1989–1990); San Francisco 49ers (1991)*; Green Bay Packers (1992)*; Montreal Machine (1992)
- * Offseason or practice squad member only

Career NFL statistics
- Receptions: 172
- Receiving yards: 2,370
- Receiving touchdowns: 12
- Return yards: 2,141
- Return touchdowns: 2
- Stats at Pro Football Reference

William H. "Pete" Mandley (born July 29, 1961) is an American former professional football player who was a wide receiver in the National Football League (NFL). He was selected by the Detroit Lions in the second round of the 1984 NFL draft. Standing at 5'10" and 191 lbs. from Northern Arizona, Mandley played in seven NFL seasons from 1984 to 1990. His best year as a pro came during the 1987 season for the Lions when he caught 58 receptions for 720 yards and 7 touchdowns.

On August 16, 1987, Mandley and his family were supposed to be on Northwest Airlines Flight 255 from Detroit to Phoenix when his daughter had taken ill. He cancelled his reservation and decided that he and his family would stay in Detroit an extra day. He later learned that the flight had crashed on takeoff killing all but one on board.

== NFL career statistics ==
Legend
**Bold**	Career high

Year	Team	Games		Receiving				
Year	Team	GP	GS	Rec	Yds	Avg	Lng	TD
1984	DET	15	0	3	38	12.7	19	0
1985	DET	16	0	18	316	**17.6**	37	0
1986	DET	16	0	7	106	15.1	51	0
1987	DET	12	12	**58**	**720**	12.4	41	**7**
1988	DET	15	14	44	617	14.0	**56**	4
1989	KAN	13	12	35	476	13.6	44	1
1990	KAN	5	2	7	97	13.9	24	0
		92	40	172	2,370	13.8	56	12
