= Darryl Rogers =

American football player and coach (1935–2018)

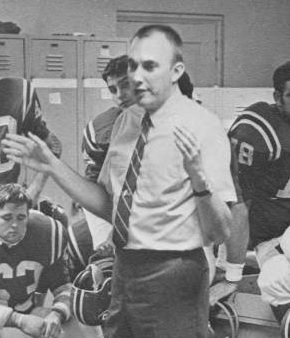
- Rogers with Fresno State in 1969

Biographical details
- Born: May 28, 1934; Los Angeles, California, U.S.
- Died: July 10, 2018 (aged 84); Fresno, California, U.S.

Playing career
- 1955–1956: Fresno State
- Positions: Wide receiver, defensive back

Coaching career (HC unless noted)
- 1961–1964: Fresno City (DB)
- 1965: Cal State Hayward
- 1966–1972: Fresno State
- 1973–1975: San Jose State
- 1976–1979: Michigan State
- 1980–1984: Arizona State
- 1985–1988: Detroit Lions
- 1990: Oklahoma City Twisters
- 1991: Winnipeg Blue Bombers

Head coaching record
- Overall: 129–84–7 (college); 18–40 (NFL); 9–9 (CFL)
- Bowls: 1–2

Accomplishments and honors

Championships
- 1 CCAA (1968); 1 PCAA (1975); 1 Big Ten (1978)

Awards
- Sporting News College Football COY (1978); Big Ten Coach of the Year (1977)

Darryl Dale Rogers (May 28, 1934 – July 10, 2018) was an American football player and coach. He served as the head coach at California State College at Hayward—now known as California State University, East Bay (1965), California State University, Fresno (1966–1972), San Jose State University (1973–1975), Michigan State University (1976–1979), and Arizona State University (1980–1984), compiling a career college football record of 129–84–7. From 1985 to 1988, Rogers was the head coach of Detroit Lions the National Football League (NFL), tallying a mark of 18–40. In 1991, served as head coach of the Winnipeg Blue Bombers of the Canadian Football League (CFL), coaching the Blue Bombers to a 9–9 record and an appearance in the East Final.

== Early life and education ==
Born in Los Angeles, Rogers graduated from Jordan High School in Long Beach, California. After attending Long Beach City College, Rogers transferred to Fresno State College (now California State University, Fresno). At Fresno State, Rogers completed two degrees in physical education, a bachelor's degree in 1957 and master's degree in 1964. He played at end, with both wide receiver and defensive back roles, on the Fresno State Bulldogs football team in 1955 and 1956.

In the 1957 NFL draft, the Los Angeles Rams selected Rogers in the 24th round with the 280th overall pick.

== Coaching career ==
In 1961, Rogers became defensive backfield coach at Fresno City College. He served as the head coach at Cal State Hayward (now Cal State East Bay) in 1965, Fresno State from 1966 to 1972, San Jose State from 1973 to 1975, Michigan State from 1976 to 1979, and Arizona State from 1980 to 1984, compiling a career college football record of 129–84–7.

Rogers was then the head coach of the National Football League's Detroit Lions from 1985 to 1988, where his record was 18–40. He went 7–9 in 1985 (with home wins over four playoff teams), 5–11 in 1986, 4–11 in 1987, and 2–9 in 1988, for a career record with the Lions of 18–40. One of his more famous quotes during his unsuccessful tenure with the Lions was when he once wondered aloud to reporters after a loss, "What does a coach have to do around here to get fired?" He was succeeded by Wayne Fontes.

In 1991, Rogers served as head coach of the Winnipeg Blue Bombers of the Canadian Football League (CFL) coaching the Blue Bombers to a 9–9 record and an appearance in the East Final. After the CFL stint, Rogers was named head coach of the Arkansas Miners of the fledgling Professional Spring Football League. However, the league never made it out of its first training camp and folded just ten days before the start of the 1992 season.

== Personal life ==
Living in Friant, California, in his final years, Rogers was married for over 50 years. He died on July 10, 2018, in Fresno, California, at the age of 84.

== Head coaching record ==
=== College ===
Year	Team	Overall	Conference	Standing	Bowl/playoffs	Coaches^{#}	AP^{°}
Cal State Hayward Pioneers (Far Western Conference) (1965)
1965	Cal State Hayward	3–7	0–0	NA			
Cal State Hayward:		3–7	0–0				
Fresno State Bulldogs (California Collegiate Athletic Association) (1966–1968)
1966	Fresno State	7–3	3–2	T–2nd			
1967	Fresno State	3–8	3–2	T–2nd			
1968	Fresno State	7–4	4–0	1st	L Camellia		
Fresno State Bulldogs (Pacific Coast Athletic Association) (1969–1972)
1969	Fresno State	6–4	1–3	T–5th			
1970	Fresno State	8–4	4–2	3rd	L Mercy		
1971	Fresno State	6–5	3–2	3rd			
1972	Fresno State	6–4–1	1–3	T–3rd			
Fresno State:		43–32–1	19–14				
San Jose State Spartans (Pacific Coast Athletic Association) (1973–1975)
1973	San Jose State	5–4–2	2–0–2	2nd			
1974	San Jose State	8–3–1	2–2	T–2nd			
1975	San Jose State	9–2	5–0	1st			
San Jose State:		22–9–3	9–2–2				
Michigan State Spartans (Big Ten Conference) (1976–1979)
1976	Michigan State	4–6–1	3–5	T–7th			
1977	Michigan State	7–3–1	6–1–1	3rd			
1978	Michigan State	8–3	7–1	T–1st			12
1979	Michigan State	5–6	3–5	T–6th			
Michigan State:		24–18–2	19–12–1				
Arizona State Sun Devils (Pacific-10 Conference) (1980–1984)
1980	Arizona State	7–4	5–3	4th			
1981	Arizona State	9–2	5–2	T–2nd			16
1982	Arizona State	10–2	5–2	T–3rd	W Fiesta	6	6
1983	Arizona State	6–4–1	3–3–1	T–6th			
1984	Arizona State	5–6	3–4	6th			
Arizona State:		37–18–1	21–14–1				
Total:		129–84–7					
National championship Conference title Conference division title or championship game berth
^{#}Rankings from final Coaches Poll.; ^{°}Rankings from final AP Poll.

=== NFL ===
Team	Year	Regular season					Postseason			
Team	Year	Won	Lost	Ties	Win %	Finish	Won	Lost	Win %	Result
DET	1985	7	9	0	.438	4th in NFC Central	-	-		
DET	1986	5	11	0	.313	3rd in NFC Central	-	-		
DET	1987	4	11	0	.267	5th in NFC Central	-	-		
DET	1988	2	9	0	.182	4th in NFC Central	-	-		
Total		18	40	0	.310		-	-	-	

=== CFL ===
Team	Year	Regular season					Postseason		
Team	Year	Won	Lost	Ties	Win %	Finish	Won	Lost	Result
WPG	1991	9	9	0	.500	2nd in East Division	1	1	Lost in East Final
Total		9	9	0	.500	-	1	1	-
