= John Witkowski =

American football player (born 1962)

No. 12, 18
- Position: Quarterback

Personal information
- Born: June 18, 1962 (age 64); Flushing, New York, U.S.
- Listed height: 6 ft 1 in (1.85 m)
- Listed weight: 200 lb (91 kg)

Career information
- High school: Lindenhurst (NY)
- College: Columbia
- NFL draft: 1984: 6th round, 160th overall pick

Career history
- Detroit Lions (1984); Houston Oilers (1986–1987); Detroit Lions (1988); London Monarchs (1991); Detroit Drive (1991)

Career NFL statistics
- Passing attempts: 35
- Passing completions: 13
- Completion percentage: 37.1%
- TD–INT: 0–0
- Passing yards: 210
- Passer rating: 58
- Stats at Pro Football Reference

John Joseph Witkowski (born June 18, 1962) is an American former professional football player who was a quarterback for the Detroit Lions of the National Football League (NFL). He played college football for the Columbia Lions.

== Football career ==
John Witkowski was the winner of the 1982 Asa A. Bushnell Cup for leadership, competitive spirit, contribution to the team, and accomplishments on the field, Witkowski holds 12 Columbia Lions passing records, six total offense marks, and five Ivy League records. He remained a Lion after his collegiate career, being picked by Detroit Lions in the sixth round of the 1984 NFL draft. He was also the first starting quarterback of the London Monarchs of the World League of American Football, although he lost his place in the team's very first game.

== Personal life ==
He is currently President/CEO of the Independent Bankers Association of New York State and is a former executive vice president and retail banking executive for Five Star Bank.
