= Ken Jenkins (American football) =

American football player (born 1959)

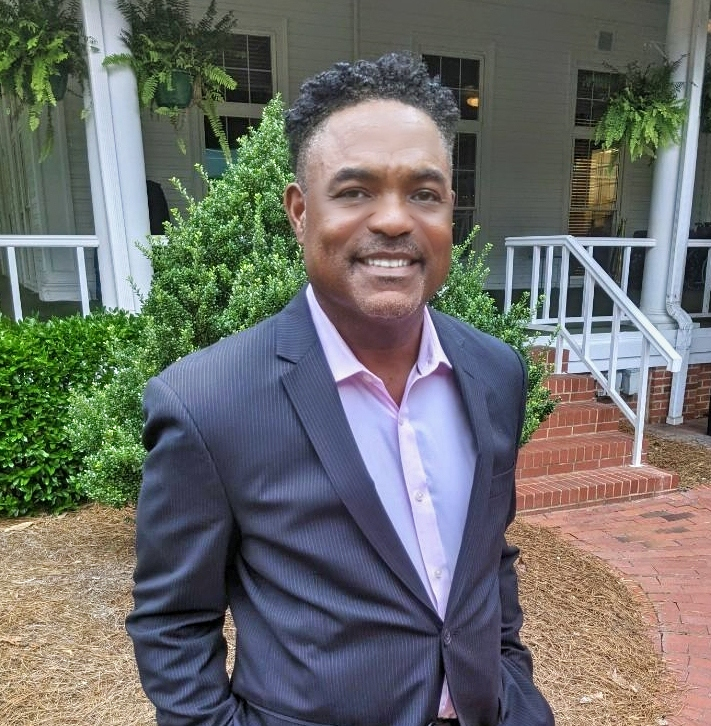

No. 31
- Position: Running back

Personal information
- Born: May 8, 1959 (age 67); Washington, DC, U.S.
- Listed height: 6 ft 3 in (1.91 m)
- Listed weight: 195 lb (88 kg)

Career information
- College: Bucknell

Career history
- 1982: Philadelphia Eagles
- 1983–1984: Detroit Lions
- 1985–1986: Washington Redskins
- Stats at Pro Football Reference

Kenneth Walton 'Kenny' Jenkins (born May 8, 1959) is an American former professional football player who was a running back in the National Football League (NFL).

He played in the NFL for the Philadelphia Eagles, Detroit Lions, and Washington Redskins from 1982 to 1987. He played college football for the Bucknell Bison. Jenkins retired from the Washington Redskins in 1987. He holds an NFL record as the only player to amass 75+ yards rushing, 75+ yards receiving, and 75+ yards on kickoff returns in one game.

== Business ==
Jenkins, a senior advisor, is a top producer for National Financial Partners, an insurance and financial-solutions company. He is also a motivational speaker.

Jenkins is a member of the board of trustees for Landon School, a private independent school in Bethesda, Maryland; a member of the Washington, DC Board of Trade; and board member for several nonprofits.

Jenkins has previously served as president of the NFL Players Association Former Players Chapter in Washington, DC.
