= Eddie Murray (American football) =

Canadian (born 1956)

No. 3, 2
- Position: Placekicker

Personal information
- Born: August 29, 1956 (age 70); Halifax, Nova Scotia, Canada
- Listed height: 5 ft 10 in (1.78 m)
- Listed weight: 177 lb (80 kg)

Career information
- High school: Saanich (BC) Spectrum
- College: Tulane
- NFL draft: 1980: 7th round, 166th overall pick
- CFL draft: 1980: 3rd round, 26th overall pick

Career history
- Detroit Lions (1980–1991); Kansas City Chiefs (1992); Tampa Bay Buccaneers (1992); Dallas Cowboys (1993); Philadelphia Eagles (1994); Washington Redskins (1995); Minnesota Vikings (1997); Detroit Lions (1999)*; Dallas Cowboys (1999); Washington Redskins (2000)
- * Offseason or practice squad member only

Awards and highlights
- Super Bowl champion (XXVIII); First-team All-Pro (1980); 3× Second-team All-Pro (1981, 1982, 1989); 2× Pro Bowl (1981,1990); First Rookie to earn MVP in 1981 Pro Bowl; NFL scoring leader (1981); Second-team NFL 1980s All-Decade Team; PFWA All-Rookie Team (1980); Detroit Lions 75th Anniversary Team; 3× All-South Independent (1977, 1978, 1979); All-Louisiana (1979)

Career NFL statistics
- Field goals attempted: 466
- Field goals made: 352
- Field goal %: 75.5
- Points scored: 1,594
- Stats at Pro Football Reference

Edward Peter Murray (born August 29, 1956) is a Canadian former professional football player who was a kicker in the National Football League (NFL) for the Detroit Lions, Kansas City Chiefs, Tampa Bay Buccaneers, Dallas Cowboys, Philadelphia Eagles, Minnesota Vikings and Washington Redskins. He played college football at Tulane University.

== Early life ==
Murray grew up in Victoria, British Columbia, and attended Spectrum Community School, where he practiced soccer, track, cricket and rugby, although it didn't have an American football team.

After graduation, he spent a year working with a fork lift in a lumber yard. He played junior football for the Saanich Hornets of the Lower Island Junior Varsity League. He was discovered by Tulane University at a camp run by Canadian football coach Cal Murphy.

== College career ==
Murray accepted a football scholarship to attend Tulane University. Murray was named the starter at placekicker in his freshman year making 12-of-22 field goals (54.5%), 11-of-13 extra points (84.6%). As a junior, he posted 12-of-18 field goals (68.8%) and 21-of-21 extra points (100%).

As a senior, he tallied 11-of-16 field goals (68.75%) and 35-for-35 extra points (100%). He finished his college career as the school's record holder in field goals (45), points by a kicker (219), highest field goal percentage (.616) and extra points (84).

In 1987, he was inducted into the Tulane University Athletics Hall of Fame. In 2006, he was inducted into the Greater New Orleans Sports Hall of Fame. In 2010, he was inducted into the Michigan Sports Hall of Fame.

== Professional career ==
=== Detroit Lions ===
Murray was selected by the Detroit Lions in the seventh round (166th overall) of the 1980 NFL draft. He was also selected in the third round (26th overall) of the 1980 CFL draft by the Hamilton Tiger-Cats.

As a rookie, he replaced veteran kicker Benny Ricardo, making 27-of-42 field goals (64.3%) and 35-of-36 extra points (97.2%). After winning the NFC scoring title with 116 points and setting a franchise record with 27 field goals, he was named to the Pro Bowl where he made 5 field goals and became the only rookie to ever receive the MVP award for the game.

In 1981, he made a last-minute field goal to beat the Dallas Cowboys. The play was memorable for the fact that the Lions were able to execute the kick without a huddle and out of a non-kicking formation.

In 1983, he made the longest field goal in Lions history (54 yards). In the NFC Divisional Playoff at San Francisco, with the Lions trailing 24–23 with 11 seconds left in the game, Murray, having earlier made a 54-yard field goal (an NFL playoff record at the time), narrowly missed a 43-yard attempt that sealed a 23–24 loss.

In 1985, he set a franchise record with 12 straight field goals. The next year, he set the franchise single-season record with 684 points. In 1988, he was a Pro Bowl alternate.

In 1988 and 1989, he tied an NFL record for the highest field goal accuracy in a season (95.24%).

Murray led the team in scoring in each of his first 10 seasons until 1990, when a hip injury kept him out of 5 games and prevented him from leading the team in scoring for the first time in his career, with Barry Sanders being first.

On April 29, 1992, he was waived to make room for second round draft choice Jason Hanson. He left as the franchise's All-time leading scorer, ranking 17th in NFL history and was the ninth Lion to have played in 12 seasons.

=== Kansas City Chiefs ===
On October 24, 1992, he signed with the Kansas City Chiefs to play one game in place of an injured Nick Lowery. He was released on October 28.

=== Tampa Bay Buccaneers ===
On November 10, 1992, he was signed by the Tampa Bay Buccaneers to replace a struggling Ken Willis. He made 4-of-8 field goals (50%) and 13-of-13 (100%) extra points.

In 1993, he had an excellent training camp, but the team decided to keep undrafted free agent Michael Husted, who displayed a stronger leg in kickoffs. He was released on August 23.

=== Dallas Cowboys (first stint) ===
On September 14, 1993, he was signed by the Dallas Cowboys after a 0–2 start to replace a struggling Lin Elliott. Against the Green Bay Packers, he tied a franchise mark with 5 field goals made in a single-game. Against the Minnesota Vikings, he set a franchise record with 2 field goals made over 50 yards. His 3 field goals over 50 yards in a single-season tied for second in club history.

In just 14 games, he had the best season of his career, making 27 out of 32 field goal attempts (122 points) in the regular season and all 6 in the playoffs. He set a club mark by making 28 field goals. He ranked second in franchise history with 122 points in a single season, 10 consecutive field goals made and an 84.8% field goal average in a single-season.

Murray made a game-winning field goal in overtime in the regular season finale against the New York Giants, which determined the NFC East Title and NFC home field advantage throughout the playoffs. On January 30, 1994, he kicked three field goals in Super Bowl XXVIII, earning a Super Bowl ring as a member of the champion Cowboys.

=== Philadelphia Eagles ===
On March 23, 1994, he was signed as a free agent by the Philadelphia Eagles to replace kicker Roger Ruzek. He made 21-of-25 field goals (84%) and 33-of-33 extra points (100%). On July 22, 1995, he was released to make room for placekicker Gary Anderson.

=== Washington Redskins (first stint) ===
On August 8, 1995, he was signed by the Washington Redskins to replace a struggling Chip Lohmiller. He was re-signed on May 15, 1996. He was released on August 25, after being passed on the depth chart by Scott Blanton.

=== Minnesota Vikings ===
On September 24, 1997, he was signed by the Minnesota Vikings after being out of football for a year, to replace kicker Greg Davis. He made 12-of-17 field goals (70.6%) and 23-of-24 extra points (95.8%), highlighted by his game-winning field goal in the closing seconds to cap off a 23–22 comeback win over the Giants in the Wild Card. He wasn't re-signed after the season and was replaced with Gary Anderson.

=== Detroit Lions ===
On June 2, 1999, he signed a one-day contract to retire with the Detroit Lions.

=== Dallas Cowboys (second stint) ===
On December 9, 1999, he was signed and brought out of retirement by the Dallas Cowboys after being out of football for over a year, to replace Richie Cunningham. He appeared in 4 games, making 7-of-9 field goals (77.8%) and 10-of-10 extra points (100%). He wasn't re-signed after the season and was replaced with Tim Seder.

=== Washington Redskins (second stint) ===
On November 9, 2000, he was signed by the Washington Redskins as part of a revolving door of kickers and at the time was the league's oldest player. He struggled during the season and missed 2 game-winning field goal attempts, the latter of which a 49-yard attempt to beat the Super Bowl-bound Giants in Week 14 that landed short. He wasn't re-signed and retired as the 16th highest scorer in NFL history. His 250 career NFL games set the record for a Canadian-born player, which was broken by long snapper L.P. Ladouceur in 2020.

== Career regular season statistics ==
Career high/best bolded

Regular season statistics
Season	Team (record)	G	FGM	FGA	%	<20	20-29	30-39	40-49	50+	LNG	BLK	XPM	XPA	%	PTS
1980	DET (9–7)	**16**	27	**42**	64.3	0–1	**9–9**	10–13	7–15	1–4	52	0	35	36	97.2	116
1981	DET (8–8)	**16**	25	35	71.4	1–1	5–5	9–14	7–11	**3–4**	53	0	**46**	**46**	**100.0**	121
1982	DET (4–5)	7	11	12	91.7	0–0	6–6	2–2	3–4	0–0	49	0	16	16	**100.0**	49
1983	DET (9–7)	**16**	25	32	78.1	0–0	6–6	**13–15**	3–7	**3–4**	**54**	0	38	38	**100.0**	113
1984	DET (4–11–1)	**16**	20	27	74.1	1–1	1–2	5–7	**12–13**	1–4	52	0	31	31	**100.0**	91
1985	DET (7–9)	**16**	26	31	83.9	2–2	5–8	11–11	6–7	2–3	51	0	31	33	93.9	109
1986	DET (5–11)	**16**	18	25	72.0	2–2	1–2	7–8	6–8	2–5	52	0	31	32	96.9	85
1987	DET (4–11)	12	20	32	62.5	1–1	6–6	7–12	5–11	1–2	53	0	21	21	**100.0**	81
1988	DET (4–12)	**16**	20	21	**95.2**	1–1	8–8	9–9	2–2	0–1	48	0	22	23	95.7	82
1989	DET (7–9)	**16**	20	21	**95.2**	0–0	3–3	8–9	8–8	1–1	50	0	36	36	**100.0**	96
1990	DET (6–10)	11	13	19	68.4	0–0	6–6	4–6	3–5	0–2	47	0	34	34	**100.0**	73
1991	DET (12–4)	**16**	19	28	67.9	1–1	3–4	8–10	5–9	2–4	50	**1**	40	40	**100.0**	97
1992	KC (10–6)	1	1	1	100.0	0–0	0–0	0–0	0–0	1–1	52	0	0	0	0.0	3
1992	TB (5–11)	7	4	8	50.0	0–0	0–0	2–4	2–4	0–0	47	0	13	13	**100.0**	25
1993	DAL (12–4)	14	**28**	33	84.8	**4–4**	4–4	9–12	8–8	3–5	52	0	38	38	**100.0**	**122**
1994	PHI (7–9)	**16**	21	25	84.0	1–1	8–8	10–10	2–6	0–0	42	0	33	33	**100.0**	96
1995	WAS (6–10)	**16**	27	36	75.0	1–1	**9–9**	10–13	6–11	1–2	52	0	33	33	**100.0**	114
1997	MIN (9–7)	12	12	17	70.6	0–0	7–7	1–3	4–6	0–1	49	**1**	23	24	95.8	59
1999	DAL (8–8)	4	7	9	77.8	0–0	3–3	3–4	1–2	0–0	40	0	10	10	**100.0**	31
2000	WAS (8–8)	6	8	12	66.7	0–2	2–2	3–3	3–6	0–0	47	0	7	8	87.5	31
Career (19 seasons)		250	352	466	75.5	15–18	92–98	131–165	93–143	21–43	54	2	538	545	98.7	1594

== Personal life ==
Murray currently resides in Michigan with his wife Cynthia and daughter Nicole.
