= Kevin Williams (defensive back, born 1961) =

American football player (born 1961)

No. 34, 23, 37
- Position: Cornerback

Personal information
- Born: November 28, 1961 (age 64); San Diego, California, U.S.

Career information
- High school: Crawford (CA)
- College: Iowa State
- NFL draft: 1985: undrafted

Career history
- Washington Redskins (1985); Buffalo Bills (1986); Washington Redskins (1988)

Career NFL statistics
- Games played: 18
- Stats at Pro Football Reference

Kevin J. Williams (born November 28, 1961) is an American former professional football player who was a cornerback in the National Football League for the Washington Redskins and Buffalo Bills. He played college football for the Iowa State Cyclones.
