= Jeff Chadwick =

American football player (born 1960)

No. 89, 88
- Position: Wide receiver

Personal information
- Born: December 16, 1960 (age 65); Detroit, Michigan, U.S.
- Listed height: 6 ft 3 in (1.91 m)
- Listed weight: 185 lb (84 kg)

Career information
- High school: Divine Child
- College: Grand Valley State
- NFL draft: 1983: undrafted

Career history
- Detroit Lions (1983–1989); Seattle Seahawks (1989-1991); Los Angeles Rams (1992)

Awards and highlights
- PFWA All-Rookie Team (1983)

Career NFL statistics
- Receptions: 292
- Receiving yards: 4,549
- Receiving touchdowns: 27
- Stats at Pro Football Reference

Jeffrey Allan Chadwick (born December 16, 1960), is an American former professional football player in the National Football League (NFL). A 6'3", 185-lb. wide receiver from Grand Valley State University, Chadwick was never drafted by an NFL team, but did play in 126 games over 10 NFL seasons from 1983 to 1992 for the Detroit Lions, the Seattle Seahawks, and the Los Angeles Rams, catching a career total of 4549 yards and 27 touchdowns.

Chadwick attended Divine Child High School in Dearborn, Michigan before attending Grand Valley State, where he competed in track and field as well as football from 1979 to 1982. In 1993 he was admitted to Grand Valley's hall of fame. Jeff is currently residing in Mt. Pleasant, MI. Jeff is co-founder with Kristen Blackburn of Legends Football Camp & JC Youth Foundation (501)c3.

== NFL career statistics ==
Legend
**Bold**	Career high

=== Regular season ===
Year	Team	Games		Receiving				
Year	Team	GP	GS	Rec	Yds	Avg	Lng	TD
1983	DET	**16**	4	40	617	15.4	45	4
1984	DET	**16**	3	37	540	14.6	46	2
1985	DET	7	5	25	478	**19.1**	56	3
1986	DET	15	**15**	**53**	**995**	18.8	**73**	**5**
1987	DET	8	8	30	416	13.9	36	0
1988	DET	10	8	20	304	15.2	32	3
1989	DET	1	1	1	9	9.0	9	0
1989	SEA	11	0	8	95	11.9	19	0
1990	SEA	**16**	0	27	478	17.7	54	4
1991	SEA	12	0	22	255	11.6	29	3
1992	RAM	14	2	29	362	12.5	27	3
		126	46	292	4,549	15.6	73	27

=== Playoffs ===
Year	Team	Games		Receiving				
Year	Team	GP	GS	Rec	Yds	Avg	Lng	TD
1983	DET	1	0	5	58	11.6	16	0
		1	0	5	58	11.6	16	0
