= James Jones (running back, born 1961) =

American football player (born 1961)

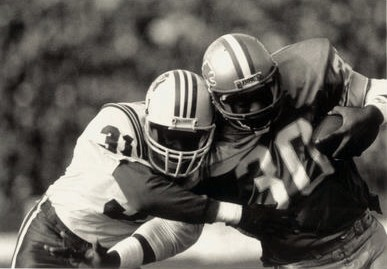
- Jones (right) playing for the Detroit Lions in 1985

No. 30
- Position: Fullback

Personal information
- Born: March 21, 1961 (age 65); Pompano Beach, Florida, U.S.
- Listed height: 6 ft 2 in (1.88 m)
- Listed weight: 229 lb (104 kg)

Career information
- High school: Blanche Ely (Pompano Beach)
- College: Florida
- NFL draft: 1983: 1st round, 13th overall pick

Career history

Playing
- Detroit Lions (1983–1988); Seattle Seahawks (1989–1992); Detroit Lions (1993)*
- * Offseason or practice squad member only

Coaching
- Blanche Ely High School (2007)

Awards and highlights
- Third-team All-American (1982); 2× First-team All-SEC (1981, 1982); University of Florida Athletic Hall of Fame

Career NFL statistics
- Rushing yards: 3,626
- Rushing touchdowns: 26
- Receptions: 318
- Receiving yards: 2,641
- Receiving touchdowns: 10
- Stats at Pro Football Reference

James Roosevelt Jones (born March 21, 1961) is an American former professional football player who was a fullback in the National Football League (NFL) for 10 seasons during the 1980s and early 1990s. Jones played college football for the Florida Gators and then played professionally for the Detroit Lions and the Seattle Seahawks of the NFL.

== Early life ==
Jones was born in Pompano Beach, Florida. He attended Blanche Ely High School in Pompano Beach, and he was a star high school football player for the Blanche Ely Mighty Tigers. Jones was so versatile in his ability to play multiple positions that he was nicknamed the "Franchise." Parade magazine named him as a high school All-American after his senior season.

In 2007, twenty-eight years after he graduated from high school, the Florida High School Athletic Association (FHSAA) recognized Jones as one of the "100 Greatest Players of the First 100 Years" of Florida high school football.

== College career ==
Jones received an athletic scholarship to attend the University of Florida in Gainesville, Florida, where he played for coach Charley Pell's Florida Gators football team from 1979 to 1982. During Jones' sophomore season in 1980, he was a member of the Gators team that posted the biggest one-year turnaround in the history of NCAA Division I football—from 0–10–1 in 1979 to an 8–4 bowl team in 1980.

He was a team captain in 1981 and 1982, a first-team All-Southeastern Conference (SEC) selection in 1981 and 1982, and a third-team/honorable mention All-American in 1982. He also received the Gators' Fergie Ferguson Award, recognizing the "senior football player who displays outstanding leadership, character and courage," in 1981. Jones finished his Gator career with 2,026 yards rushing, 593 yards receiving and forty-eight yards passing, and led the team in rushing yardage for three consecutive seasons from 1980 to 1982. He was later inducted into the University of Florida Athletic Hall of Fame as a "Gator Great" in 1998. In a 2006 article series published by The Gainesville Sun, the Sun sportswriters ranked him as the No. 45 all-time greatest Gator from the first century of the Florida Gators football team.

== Professional career ==
The Detroit Lions selected Jones in the first round (thirteenth pick overall) of the 1983 NFL draft, and he played for the Lions from 1983 to 1988. Jones started off for the Lions blocking for Billy Sims but became the featured back for the Lions in 1985 when Sims was injured. Jones played with Garry James from 1986 to 1988 and the tandem became known as the "James Gang." Jones' best game with the Lions was in week 1 of 1986 in a 13–10 win over the Vikings; he rushed for 174 yards on thirty-six carries and was recognized as the NFC offensive player of the week for his performance.

Jones was traded to the Seattle Seahawks in 1989 for defensive back Terry Taylor, and he finished his NFL career with the Seahawks in 1992. Jones finished his ten-season NFL career having played in 135 games, started ninety-one of them, rushed for 3,626 yards and twenty-six touchdowns on 1,010 carries, and caught 318 passes for 2,641 yards and ten touchdowns.

== NFL career statistics ==
Legend
**Bold**	Career high

=== Regular season ===
Year	Team	Games		Rushing					Receiving				
Year	Team	GP	GS	Att	Yds	Avg	Lng	TD	Rec	Yds	Avg	Lng	TD
1983	DET	14	14	135	475	3.5	18	6	46	467	10.2	**46**	1
1984	DET	**16**	**16**	137	532	3.9	34	3	**77**	**662**	8.6	39	**5**
1985	DET	14	13	244	886	3.6	29	6	45	334	7.4	36	3
1986	DET	**16**	**16**	**252**	**903**	3.6	**39**	**8**	54	334	6.2	21	1
1987	DET	11	11	96	342	3.6	19	0	34	262	7.7	35	0
1988	DET	14	14	96	314	3.3	13	0	29	259	8.9	40	0
1989	SEA	2	0	0	0	0.0	0	0	1	8	8.0	8	0
1990	SEA	**16**	0	5	20	**4.0**	5	0	1	22	**22.0**	22	0
1991	SEA	**16**	6	45	154	3.4	22	3	10	103	10.3	29	0
1992	SEA	**16**	1	0	0	0.0	0	0	21	190	9.0	30	0
		135	91	1,010	3,626	3.6	39	26	318	2,641	8.3	46	10

=== Playoffs ===
Year	Team	Games		Rushing					Receiving				
Year	Team	GP	GS	Att	Yds	Avg	Lng	TD	Rec	Yds	Avg	Lng	TD
1983	DET	1	1	10	33	3.3	7	0	5	44	8.8	17	0
		1	1	10	33	3.3	7	0	5	44	8.8	17	0

== Life after the NFL ==
Jones became the head football coach for his high school alma mater Blanche Ely, in 2007, but he resigned in May 2008 after a single season.

== See also ==
- Florida Gators football, 1970–79
- Florida Gators football, 1980–89
- List of Detroit Lions players
- List of Florida Gators in the NFL draft
- List of University of Florida Athletic Hall of Fame members
- List of Seattle Seahawks players
