= Clayton Beauford =

American football player (born 1963)

No. 87
- Position: Wide receiver

Personal information
- Born: March 1, 1963 (age 63); Palatka, Florida, U.S.
- Listed height: 5 ft 11 in (1.80 m)
- Listed weight: 190 lb (86 kg)

Career information
- High school: Palatka
- College: Auburn
- NFL draft: 1985: 10th round, 258th overall pick

Career history
- Detroit Lions (1985); Cleveland Browns (1987)

Career NFL statistics
- Games played: 1
- Kick returns: 1
- Return yards: 22
- Stats at Pro Football Reference

Clayton Maurice Beauford (born March 1, 1963) is an American former professional football player who was a wide receiver for the Cleveland Browns of the National Football League (NFL) in 1987. He played college football for the Auburn Tigers.

Beauford graduated from Palatka High School in Palatka, Florida, in 1981. He attended Auburn University from 1981 to 1984. In October 1982, he scored a touchdown on a 60-yard pass play against Georgia Tech. In 1984, he was the subject of an investigation in which it was alleged that his high school records had been altered to allow him to attend Auburn on a football scholarship. The principal, assistant principal, a masonry teacher and another person at the high school were later charged with official misconduct, filing false reports, or perjury in the matter. Beauford was selected in the tenth round (258th overall) by the Detroit Lions but spent the 1985 season on the injury list after sustaining a broken kneecap in the 1985 Senior Bowl. He was released by the Lions in August 1986. Beauford also played in the USFL for the Birmingham Stallions. In 1987, he played for the Cleveland Browns, appearing in only one game with a kick return of 22 yards.
