= Kirk Dodge =

American football player (born 1962)

No. 93, 50, 59
- Position: Linebacker

Personal information
- Born: June 4, 1962 (age 64); Whittier, California, U.S.
- Listed height: 6 ft 2 in (1.88 m)
- Listed weight: 231 lb (105 kg)

Career information
- High school: Lowell (Whittier)
- College: UNLV
- NFL draft: 1984: 7th round, 175th overall pick

Career history
- Atlanta Falcons (1984)*; Detroit Lions (1984); Houston Oilers (1986); Denver Broncos (1987); New York Jets (1989)*
- * Offseason or practice squad member only

Career NFL statistics
- Fumble recoveries: 1
- Stats at Pro Football Reference

Kirk Dodge (born June 4, 1962) is an American former professional football player who was a linebacker in the National Football League (NFL). He played college football for the UNLV Rebels. Dodge was selected by the Atlanta Falcons in the seventh round of the 1984 NFL draft. He played for the Detroit Lions in 1984, the Houston Oilers in 1986 and for the Denver Broncos in 1987.
