= Angelo King =

American football player (born 1958)

No. 57, 92
- Position: Linebacker

Personal information
- Born: February 10, 1958; Columbia, South Carolina, U.S.
- Listed height: 6 ft 1 in (1.85 m)
- Listed weight: 224 lb (102 kg)

Career information
- High school: Columbia
- College: South Carolina State
- NFL draft: 1981: undrafted

Career history
- Dallas Cowboys (1981–1983); Detroit Lions (1984–1987)

Awards and highlights
- 2× All-MEAC (1979, 1980); Second-team All-MEAC (1978); Honorable-mention Little All-American (1980); S.C. State All-Century Team

Career NFL statistics
- Sacks: 6
- Fumble recoveries: 3
- Touchdowns: 1
- Stats at Pro Football Reference

Angelo King (born February 10, 1958) is an American former professional football player who was a linebacker in the National Football League (NFL) for the Dallas Cowboys and Detroit Lions. He played college football for the South Carolina State Bulldogs.

== Early life ==
King attended Columbia High School. He accepted a football scholarship from the South Carolina State University.

He was named a starter at linebacker midway through his freshman season, and was a part of the 1977 team that was awarded the National Black Championship by the Pittsburgh Courier newspaper.

King was a four-year starter that received All-MEAC honors in 1979 and 1980. He also received honorable-mention Little All-American honors in 1980. As a senior, he blocked a school record 4 punts (6 in his career).

In 2007, he was named to the South Carolina State Centennial Football Team. In 2012, he was inducted into the South Carolina State Athletic Hall of Fame.

== Professional career ==
=== Dallas Cowboys ===
King was signed as an undrafted free agent by the Dallas Cowboys after the 1981 NFL draft. He was waived on August 3. He was re-signed and released again on August 25. On September 8, he was re-signed after linebacker Mike Hegman fractured his arm in the season opener against the Washington Redskins. He played mainly on special teams and remained on the roster after Hegman returned.

He was mainly a nickel linebacker and special teams player for three seasons. On August 27, 1984, he was traded to the Detroit Lions in exchange for a sixth round draft choice (#151-Stan Gelbaugh).

=== Detroit Lions ===
King was a part-time starter and special teams player for the Detroit Lions in his first season with the team. In 1985, the team changed to a 3-4 defense and although he was assigned the role of nickel linebacker, he eventually started 9 games after Michael Cofer was lost for the year and posted career-highs with 90 tackles (77 solo) and 4 sacks.

The next year, he missed 5 games with an ankle injury (4 weeks spent on the injured reserve list). After Jimmy Williams was lost for the year, he started the last 4 games at strongside linebacker and finished with 23 tackles.

He was cut on September 6, 1987. After the players went on a strike on the third week of the season, those games were canceled (reducing the 16 game season to 15) and the NFL decided that the games would be played with replacement players. King was re-signed to be a part of the Lions replacement team, but was injured in the first game and placed on the injured reserve list, before being released on October 27.
