= Arnold Brown (American football) =

American football player (born 1962)

No. 23, 20
- Position: Defensive back

Personal information
- Born: August 27, 1962 (age 64); Wilmington, North Carolina, U.S.
- Listed height: 5 ft 11 in (1.80 m)
- Listed weight: 185 lb (84 kg)

Career information
- High school: Emsley A. Laney (Wilmington)
- College: North Carolina Central (1981–1984)
- NFL draft: 1985: 5th round, 128th overall pick

Career history
- Seattle Seahawks (1985)*; Detroit Lions (1985–1986); Seattle Seahawks (1987); Denver Broncos (1988)*
- * Offseason or practice squad member only

Career NFL statistics
- Fumble recoveries: 1
- Stats at Pro Football Reference

Arnold Lee Brown (born August 27, 1962) is an American former professional football player who was a defensive back for two seasons in the National Football League (NFL) with the Detroit Lions and Seattle Seahawks. He played college football for the North Carolina Central Eagles and was selected by the Seahawks in the fifth round of the 1985 NFL draft. He was also a member of the Denver Broncos.

== Early life and college ==
Arnold Lee Brown was born in Wilmington, North Carolina. He attended Emsley A. Laney High School in Wilmington. In college, he was a four-year letterman for the North Carolina Central Eagles from 1981 to 1984.

== Profesional career ==
Brown was selected by the Seattle Seahawks in the fifth round, with the 128th overall pick, of the 1985 NFL draft. He officially signed with the team on July 21. He was released on August 27, 1985.

Brown signed with the Detroit Lions on September 10, 1985. He played in seven games for the Lions during the 1985 season before being placed on injured reserve on November 2, 1985. He was placed on injured reserve again the following year on August 22, 1986, and spent the entire season there. He was released on August 26, 1987.

Brown was signed by the Seattle Seahawks on October 9, 1987, during the 1987 NFL players strike. He appeared in two games for the Seahawks before being released on October 20, 1987, after the strike ended.

Brown signed with the Denver Broncos on March 28, 1998. He was released on July 18, 1988.
