= John Bostic =

American football player (born 1962)

Jon Bostic Sr.
No. 42
- Position: Defensive back

Personal information
- Born: October 6, 1962 (age 64); Titusville, Florida, U.S.
- Listed height: 5 ft 10 in (1.78 m)
- Listed weight: 175 lb (79 kg)

Career information
- High school: Astronaut (Titusville)
- College: Bethune–Cookman
- NFL draft: 1985: 6th round, 149th overall pick

Career history
- Kansas City Chiefs (1985)*; Detroit Lions (1985–1987)
- * Offseason or practice squad member only

Career NFL statistics
- Interceptions: 1
- Stats at Pro Football Reference

Jonathan Earl Bostic Sr. (born October 6, 1962) is an American former professional football player who was a defensive back who played for the Detroit Lions of the National Football League (NFL) from 1985 to 1987. He played college football for the Bethune–Cookman Wildcats. He was selected 149th overall by the Kansas City Chiefs in the sixth round of the 1985 NFL draft.

Bostic's son, Jon, also played in the NFL.
