= Donald Laster =

American football player (born 1958)

No. 62, 73
- Position: Offensive tackle

Personal information
- Born: December 13, 1958 (age 67); Albany, Georgia, U.S.
- Listed height: 6 ft 5 in (1.96 m)
- Listed weight: 285 lb (129 kg)

Career information
- High school: Dougherty (Albany)
- College: Tennessee State
- NFL draft: 1982: 12th round, 309th overall pick

Career history
- Washington Redskins (1982); Detroit Lions (1984)

Awards and highlights
- Super Bowl champion (XVII); Albany Sports Hall of Fame (2004)

Career NFL statistics
- Games played: 22
- Games started: 8
- Stats at Pro Football Reference

Anthony Donald Laster (born December 13, 1958) is an American former professional football player who was an offensive lineman in the National Football League (NFL) for the Washington Redskins and Detroit Lions. He played college football for the Tennessee State Tigers and was selected 309th overall in the 12th round of the 1982 NFL draft.
