= Duane Galloway =

American football player (born 1961)

No. 40
- Position: Cornerback

Personal information
- Born: November 7, 1961 (age 64); Los Angeles, California, U.S.
- Listed height: 5 ft 8 in (1.73 m)
- Listed weight: 181 lb (82 kg)

Career information
- High school: Crenshaw (Los Angeles)
- College: Arizona State
- NFL draft: 1983: undrafted

Career history
- Los Angeles Express (1983)*; Saskatchewan Roughriders (1983); Indianapolis Colts (1984); Detroit Lions (1985–1988)
- * Offseason or practice squad member only

Career NFL statistics
- Games played: 28
- Interceptions: 7
- Stats at Pro Football Reference

Duane Keith Galloway (born November 7, 1961) is an American former professional football player who was a cornerback for the Detroit Lions of the National Football League (NFL). He played college football for the Arizona State Sun Devils.
