= Leon Evans =

American football player (born 1961)

No. 66
- Position: Defensive end

Personal information
- Born: October 1, 1961 (age 65); Silver Spring, Maryland
- Listed height: 6 ft 5 in (1.96 m)
- Listed weight: 282 lb (128 kg)

Career information
- High school: Montgomery Blair
- College: Miami (FL)
- NFL draft: 1983: undrafted

Career history
- Washington Redskins (1983)*; Detroit Lions (1985–1986)
- * Offseason or practice squad member only
- Stats at Pro Football Reference

Leon Evans (born October 1, 1961) is an American former NFL defensive end who played for the Detroit Lions from 1985 to 1986 for a total of 24 career games.
