= David Jones (offensive lineman) =

Taiwanese gridiron football player (born 1961)

No. 51, 69, 58
- Positions: Guard, center

Personal information
- Born: October 25, 1961 (age 65); Taipei, Taiwan
- Listed height: 6 ft 3 in (1.91 m)
- Listed weight: 262 lb (119 kg)

Career information
- High school: David Crockett (Austin, Texas, U.S.)
- College: Texas
- NFL draft: 1984: 8th round, 214th overall pick

Career history
- Detroit Lions (1984–1985); Denver Broncos (1987); Washington Redskins (1987)

Awards and highlights
- Super Bowl champion (XXII)

Career NFL statistics
- Games played: 27
- Games started: 9
- Fumble recoveries: 1
- Stats at Pro Football Reference

David Jeffrey Jones (born October 25, 1961) is a former National Football League (NFL) offensive lineman who won a Super Bowl ring with the Washington Redskins. He played college football at the University of Texas where he won a Southwest Conference Championship and missed the National Championship by 1 point. He was drafted by the Detroit Lions in the eighth round of the 1984 NFL draft. He played for the Lions in 1984 and 1985 before suffering a neck injury. After missing the 1986 season he returned to play for the Denver Broncos for the three games played during the 1987 players strike. Later, but during the same season he was signed by the Washington Redskins with whom he played the five last regular season games and two playoff games on their way to a victory over Jones' former Denver Broncos team in Super Bowl XXII.

After he suffered a concussion in the 1987 NFC Championship game, Jones announced his retirement and was deactivated by the Redskins prior to Super Bowl XXII.
