= Eric Hipple =

American football player and public speaker (born 1957)

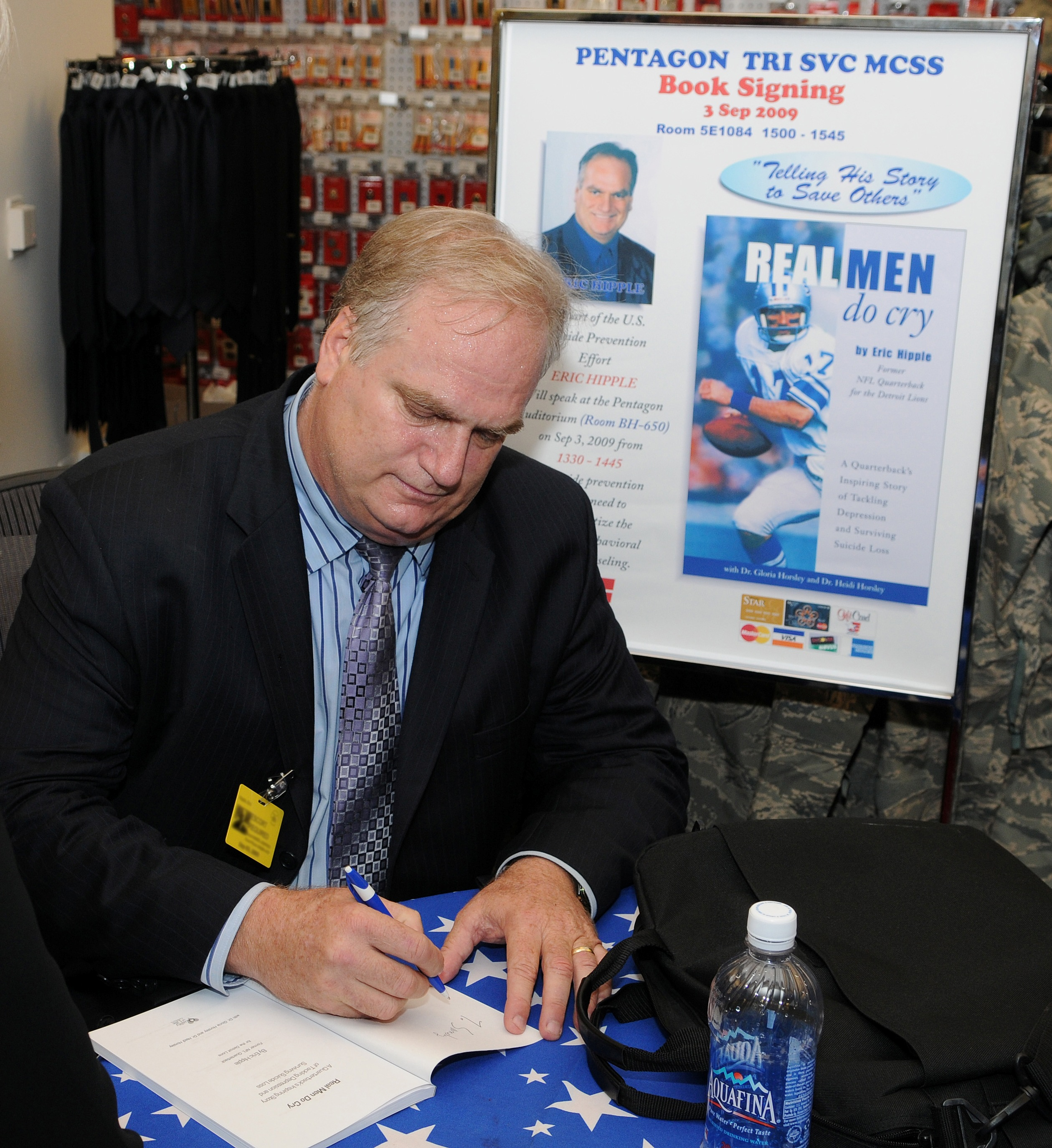
- Hipple at a book signing in September 2009.

No. 17
- Position: Quarterback

Personal information
- Born: September 16, 1957 (age 69); Lubbock, Texas, U.S.
- Listed height: 6 ft 2 in (1.88 m)
- Listed weight: 196 lb (89 kg)

Career information
- College: Utah State
- NFL draft: 1980: 4th round, 85th overall pick

Career history
- Detroit Lions (1980–1989)

Awards and highlights
- NFL completion percentage leader (1986)

Career NFL statistics
- Passing attempts: 1,546
- Passing completions: 830
- Completion percentage: 53.7%
- TD–INT: 55–70
- Passing yards: 10,711
- Passer rating: 68.7
- Rushing yards: 530
- Rushing touchdowns: 13
- Stats at Pro Football Reference

Eric Ellsworth Hipple (born September 16, 1957) is an American public speaker and a former professional football player. He played as a quarterback for the Detroit Lions of the National Football League (NFL). He played college football for the Utah State Aggies.

== Early life and education ==
Eric Hipple was born in Lubbock, Texas.

Hipple attended Utah State University with an athletic scholarship. At 6 ft 2 in (1.88 m) and 198 lb (90 kg), he was a star quarterback for the team, having earned an all-Pacific Coast Athletic Association selection as a senior in 1979 to go along with winning PCC championships in 1978 and 1979. He earned a Bachelor of Science in Business Administration from the university's School of Business. He was named to the All-Century team in 1993. In 2012, he was inducted into the Utah State Hall of Fame.

== Professional career ==
Hipple was selected by the Detroit Lions in the fourth round of the 1980 NFL draft. Hipple spent the 1980 season entirely on the bench while Gary Danielson served as the starting quarterback. Hipple made his first appearance in a game in Week 5 (October 4) of the following season, throwing 4-of-15 for 102 yards and two interceptions in a loss. After the first six weeks had ended, Hipple was tapped to start against the Chicago Bears on October 19 due to Danielson suffering an injury, which resulted in him going 14-of-25 for 336 yards to go along with four passing touchdowns and two rushing touchdowns in a 48-17 victory where he threw just four total passes in the second half. The jersey worn by Hipple from that game was collected by the Pro Football Hall of Fame. He would start the remainder of the season, going 6-4 as a starter as Detroit finished 8-8; he threw 2,358 yards with 14 touchdowns to 15 interceptions with a passer rating of 73.4.

In the strike-shortened 1982 season of nine games, Hipple started the first four games while Danielson started the last five as Detroit made the postseason in an eight-team NFC playoff bracket. For the postseason game against the Washington Redskins, Hipple was tapped to start the first playoff game for the team since 1970. He went 22-of-38 for 298 yards with one touchdown and two interceptions (one returned for a touchdown by Jeris White) as Detroit lost 31-7 in a game where they trailed 10-0 from the first quarter on. Hipple was the undisputed starter for the 1983 season, and he threw for 2,577 yards with 12 touchdowns and 18 interceptions as the Lions went 9-7 but Hipple suffered moderate tear of his left knee ligament against Tampa Bay in the season finale (which meant he would be out for roughly 2-6 weeks) that resulted in Danielson serving as the starter for the Divisional Round playoff game against the San Francisco 49ers, which Detroit narrowly lost. Hipple played in just two games of the 1984 season due to knee issues. The team signed him to a two-year contract on March 26, 1985. Hipple would start the first fifteen games of the 1985 season before being used in relief for the finale that ultimately saw the Lions go 7-9 while he passed for 2,952 yards with 17 touchdowns to 18 interceptions.

Hipple started the first ten games of the 1986 season, which saw them win just three games before Joe Ferguson and Chuck Long finished out the season. He threw for 1,919 yards with nine touchdowns to 11 interceptions. Hipple had 63% of his passes (192-for-305) result in a completion to lead the NFL. He was the first Lion to lead in completion percentage since Bobby Layne in 1955 and is currently the last Lion to finish as a leader. Hipple missed the entire 1987 season due to a sprained thumb. Long would be tapped to start as quarterback for the Lions the following year while Hipple was named the backup. He played in just five games. Hipple appeared in one game of the 1989 season. He started against the Vikings on October 8 and threw 7-of-18 for 90 yards and three interceptions with one rushing touchdown in a 24-17 loss. He suffered a broken ankle during the game. The following month, on November 7, 1989, the Lions cut him from the roster, which now had Bob Gagliano and Rodney Peete start games. The game against the Vikings was the last one that the 32-year-old played in. In total, Hipple made appearances in 102 games (with 57 starts) and threw for 10,711 total yards and 55 touchdowns to 70 interceptions. He went 28-29 as a starter.

== Career statistics ==
=== NFL ===
Legend
	Led the league
**Bold**	Career high

Year	Team	Games			Passing								
Year	Team	GP	GS	Record	Cmp	Att	Pct	Yds	Avg	TD	Int	Lng	Rtg
1980	DET	15	0	Did not play									
1981	DET	**16**	10	6−4	140	279	50.2	2,358	**8.5**	14	15	**94**	73.4
1982	DET	9	4	2−2	36	86	41.9	411	4.8	2	4	52	45.3
1983	DET	**16**	**16**	**9−7**	204	387	52.7	2,577	6.7	12	**18**	80	64.7
1984	DET	8	1	1−0	16	38	42.1	246	6.5	1	1	40	62.0
1985	DET	**16**	15	7−8	**223**	**406**	54.9	**2,952**	7.3	17	**18**	56	73.6
1986	DET	**16**	10	3−7	192	305	**63.0**	1,919	6.3	9	11	46	**75.6**
1987	DET	0	0	Did not play due to injury									
1988	DET	5	0	−	12	27	44.4	158	5.9	0	0	31	63.5
1989	DET	1	1	0−1	7	18	38.9	90	5.0	0	3	30	15.7
Career		102	57	28−29	830	1,546	53.7	10,711	6.9	55	70	94	68.7

=== College ===
Season	Team	GP	Passing						
Season	Team	GP	Cmp	Att	Pct	Yds	TD	Int	Rtg
1976	Utah State	11	74	151	49.0	760	2	10	82.4
1977	Utah State	11	91	173	52.6	1,301	10	11	122.1
1978	Utah State	11	150	287	52.3	2,088	9	15	113.3
1979	Utah State	11	144	239	60.3	1,924	13	6	140.8
College career		44	459	850	54.0	6,073	34	42	117.3

== Post-athletics career ==
Hipple has been married twice.

After retiring, Hipple started his own business, Hipple & Associates, an insurance business targeted toward car dealers. In 1995, he was hired for the pregame show on Lions broadcasts, which he worked until 2000. In 1998, he attempted to kill himself by jumping out of a car window, but it was reported as merely an accident with non life-threatening injuries. In 2000, his 15-year-old son committed suicide. Hipple soon became involved in educating people about the dangers of depression. Hipple delivers speeches on suicide prevention and mental illness at high schools, youth groups, members of the military and their families, local organizations and corporations. He is the Outreach Coordinator of the Depression Center of the University of Michigan. A documentary film by the Depression Center features Hipple. He also co-authored a study about depression and pain in retired professional football players.

Hipple's book, Real Men Do Cry, was published in 2008. It discusses Hipple's playing career with the Lions, his bouts with depression, and details of the warning signs of teens who have died from suicide.

== Personal life ==
In 2000, Hipple's 15-year-old son Jeff died by suicide via shotgun. Hipple has acknowledged he has also suffered from bouts with depression, including his adolescence. After his son's death, Hipple abused drugs and alcohol, and was convicted of drunk driving and served time in jail. He filed for bankruptcy as well.

In 2005, Hipple disarmed a man wielding a knife at a party in Michigan.

== In other media ==
A football poster of Hipple can be seen on the wall in the 1983 feature film Mr. Mom.

He was a guest star in the show Home Improvement as himself (Season 3, Episode 18), building a house for Habitat for Humanity that guest starred various athletes alongside a special appearance by President Jimmy Carter.
