= Dave D'Addio =

American football player (1961–2017)

No. 44
- Position: Running back

Personal information
- Born: July 13, 1961; Newark, New Jersey, U.S.
- Died: May 29, 2017 (aged 55); Gillette, New Jersey, U.S.
- Listed height: 6 ft 2 in (1.88 m)
- Listed weight: 235 lb (107 kg)

Career information
- High school: Union (NJ)
- College: Maryland
- NFL draft: 1984: 4th round, 106th overall pick

Career history
- Detroit Lions (1984)

Career NFL statistics
- Rushing yards: 46
- Rushing average: 6.6
- Receptions: 1
- Receiving yards: 12
- Stats at Pro Football Reference

Dave D'Addio (July 13, 1961 – May 29, 2017) was a football running back in the National Football League (NFL). He was selected by the Detroit Lions in the fourth round of the 1984 NFL draft with the 106th overall pick.

D'Addio lived in Irvington New Jersey, until 1968 when his family moved to Union Township. He played for the UHS Farmers.

He played college football at the University of Maryland.

== College statistics ==
- 1982: 60 carries for 272 yards and 3 touchdowns. 19 catches for 248 yards and one touchdown.
- 1983: 46 carries for 213 yards and 5 touchdowns. 20 catches for 208 yards.
