= James Johnson (linebacker) =

American football player (born 1962)

No. 54, 56, 57
- Position: Linebacker

Personal information
- Born: June 21, 1962 (age 64); Los Angeles, California, U.S.
- Listed height: 6 ft 2 in (1.88 m)
- Listed weight: 236 lb (107 kg)

Career information
- High school: Lake Elsinore (Lake Elsinore, California)
- College: San Diego State
- NFL draft: 1985: 3rd round, 62nd overall pick

Career history
- Detroit Lions (1985–1986); San Francisco 49ers (1987); San Diego Chargers (1987); Los Angeles Raiders (1988)*; New York Jets (1989)*
- * Offseason or practice squad member only
- Stats at Pro Football Reference

James Lenord Johnson (born June 21, 1962) is an American former professional football linebacker who played in the National Football League (NFL) with the Detroit Lions, San Francisco 49ers, and San Diego Chargers. He played college football for the San Diego State Aztecs and was selected by the Lions in the third round of the 1985 NFL draft.

== Early life ==
James Lenord Johnson was born on June 21, 1962, in Los Angeles, California. He played high school football at Lake Elsinore High School in Lake Elsinore, California, and graduated in 1980.

== College career ==
Johnson played junior college football at Orange Coast College from 1981 to 1982. He transferred to San Diego State University, where he was a two-year letterman for the Aztecs from 1983 to 1984. He majored in psychology at San Diego State.

== Professional career ==
Johnson was selected by the Detroit Lions in the third round, with the 62nd overall pick, of the 1985 NFL draft. He was also selected by the Portland Breakers in the 1985 USFL draft but turned down their offer of a $45,000 signing bonus. He signed with the Lions on July 26. Johnson was placed on injured reserve on September 2, 1985, and missed the entire 1985 season. He was released on October 11, 1986, but re-signed on November 11, 1986. He played in 11 games overall during the 1986 season as a reserve linebacker. Johnson was released on September 1, 1987, after the third of four preseason games.

On September 24, 1987, Johnson signed with the San Francisco 49ers during the 1987 NFL players strike. He played in one game for the 49ers as a backup linebacker.

On October 13, 1987, Johnson was traded to the San Diego Chargers for past considerations. He appeared in one game for the Chargers in a reserve role. He was released on October 20, 1987, after the strike ended.

Johnson signed with the Los Angeles Raiders on April 22, 1988. He was released on August 3, 1988, before the first game of the 1988 preseason.

Johnson was signed by the New York Jets on April 4, 1989. He was released on August 28, 1989, after the third of four preseason games.
