= Chris Dieterich =

American football player (born 1958)

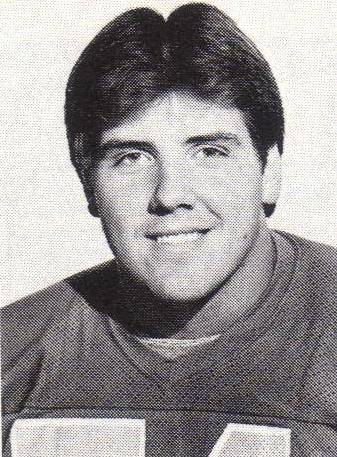
- Dieterich in 1980

No. 72
- Positions: Tackle, guard

Personal information
- Born: July 27, 1958 (age 68); Freeport, New York, U.S.
- Listed height: 6 ft 3 in (1.91 m)
- Listed weight: 262 lb (119 kg)

Career information
- High school: Ward Melville (Suffolk County, New York)
- College: NC State
- NFL draft: 1980: 6th round, 140th overall pick

Career history
- Detroit Lions (1980–1986)

Awards and highlights
- 2× First-team All-ACC (1978, 1979)

Career NFL statistics
- Games played: 105
- Games started: 49
- Fumble recoveries: 2
- Stats at Pro Football Reference

Christian Jeffrey Dieterich (born July 27, 1958) is a retired American football player who played his entire career with the Detroit Lions from 1980 to 1986.

== Early life and college career ==
Dieterich attended Ward Melville High School, earning the Long Island Newsday Hansen Award in 1975. At North Carolina State he was a two time all All ACC Tackle/Guard and was on the 1979 ACC Championship team, playing in the 1980 Hula Bowl.

== Professional career ==
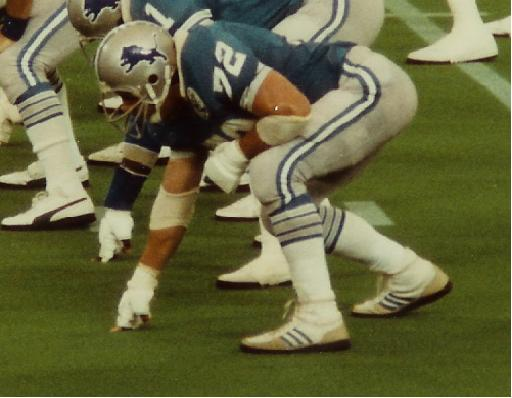
Dieterich in 1980s

Dieterich played his entire seven season career with the Detroit Lions.

== Personal life ==
Lives in Myrtle Beach, South Carolina. Dieterich writes Football & Mystery Books and donates the proceeds to Children & Animal Charities. Visit Website
