= Carl Bland =

American gridiron football player (born 1961)

No. 80, 83, 85
- Position: Wide receiver

Personal information
- Born: August 17, 1961 (age 65); Fluvanna County, Virginia, U.S.
- Listed height: 5 ft 11 in (1.80 m)
- Listed weight: 182 lb (83 kg)

Career information
- High school: Thomas Jefferson (Richmond, Virginia)
- College: Virginia Union
- NFL draft: 1984: undrafted

Career history
- Detroit Lions (1984–1988); Green Bay Packers (1989–1990); Calgary Stampeders (1991–1992)

Awards and highlights
- Grey Cup champion (1992)

Career NFL statistics
- Receptions: 90
- Receiving yards: 1,153
- Touchdowns: 6
- Stats at Pro Football Reference

Carl Nathaniel Bland (born August 17, 1961) is an American former professional football player who was a wide receiver in the National Football League (NFL). He played for the Detroit Lions and Green Bay Packers. He also played two seasons with the Calgary Stampeders, where he won a Grey Cup in 1992.

Bland is now a pastor and administrator at Confluence Preparatory Academy in St. Louis.
