= David Lewis (American football) =

American football player (born 1961)

No. 87
- Position: Tight end

Personal information
- Born: June 8, 1961 (age 65); Portland, Oregon, U.S.
- Listed height: 6 ft 3 in (1.91 m)
- Listed weight: 234 lb (106 kg)

Career information
- High school: Grant (Portland)
- College: California
- NFL draft: 1984: 1st round, 20th overall pick

Career history
- Detroit Lions (1984–1986); Miami Dolphins (1987); San Francisco 49ers (1988)*
- * Offseason or practice squad member only

Awards and highlights
- First-team All-American (1982); Second-team All-Pac-10 (1982)

Career NFL statistics
- Receptions: 60
- Receiving yards: 731
- Touchdowns: 8
- Stats at Pro Football Reference

David Wayne Lewis (born June 8, 1961) is an American former professional football player who was a tight end in the National Football League (NFL).

== Early life ==
Born and raised in Portland, Oregon, Lewis played scholastically at Grant High School, where he was selected as a high school All-American by the National High School Athletic Coaches Association. He played college football for the California Golden Bears for three seasons, and, as a junior, was honored by Gannett News Service as a first-team All-American.

== Professional career ==
Lewis was selected by the Lions in the first round (20th overall) in the 1984 NFL draft. The Lions cut him before the start of the 1987 season, and he was signed by the Miami Dolphins one month later as a replacement player. He was one of the last replacement players to be cut from the roster once the veteran players returned from the 1987 NFL player's strike, and was re-signed by the Dolphins in December.
