= Rob Rubick =

American football player (born 1960)

No. 84
- Position: Tight end

Personal information
- Born: September 27, 1960 (age 66); Newberry, Michigan, U.S.
- Listed height: 6 ft 3 in (1.91 m)
- Listed weight: 232 lb (105 kg)

Career information
- High school: Newberry (MI)
- College: Grand Valley State
- NFL draft: 1982: 12th round, 326th overall pick

Career history
- Detroit Lions (1982–1988)

Career NFL statistics
- Receptions: 44
- Receiving yards: 511
- Touchdowns: 3
- Stats at Pro Football Reference

Robin James Rubick (born September 27, 1960) is an American former professional football player who was a tight end for the Detroit Lions of the National Football League (NFL) from 1982 to 1988. He played college football for the Grand Valley State Lakers. Rubick was selected in the 12th round of the 1982 NFL draft by the Lions.

As an NFL player Rubick played in 88 games, had 4 touchdowns (3 receiving, 1 rushing), 44 receptions, and 1 carry.

From 1999 to 2007, he served as the Detroit Lions studio analyst on the Detroit Sports Report, and later on Lions Live, on Fox Sports Detroit. Rubick is currently the radio color commentator for EMU football on WEMU. After leaving professional football, Rubick received master's degrees from Eastern Michigan University and Marygrove College and currently works as a physical education and health teacher at Zemmer Middle School in Lapeer, Michigan. In 2010, he became the color commentator for preseason games on the Detroit Lions Television Network.

Rubick frequently participates in charity basketball games with other former and current Lions players, often against volunteer firefighters to help raise money for local communities around Michigan.
