= Steve Baack =

American football player (born 1960)

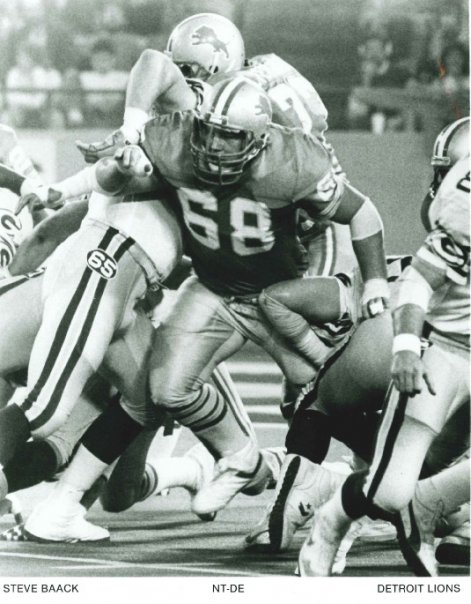
- Detroit Lions Individual Game Picture

No. 68
- Positions: Nose tackle, defensive tackle, defensive end, guard

Personal information
- Born: November 16, 1960 (age 65); Ames, Iowa, U.S.
- Listed height: 6 ft 4 in (1.93 m)
- Listed weight: 264 lb (120 kg)

Career information
- High school: Grant Union (OR) (John Day, Oregon, U.S.)
- College: Oregon
- NFL draft: 1984: 3rd round, 75th overall pick

Career history
- Detroit Lions (1984–1988)

Awards and highlights
- Second-team All-Pac-10 (1983)

Career NFL statistics
- Sacks: 2
- Fumble recoveries: 1
- Stats at Pro Football Reference

Steven William Baack (born November 16, 1960) is an American former professional football player who was a defensive lineman and offensive lineman for five seasons for the Detroit Lions of the National Football League (NFL). He was the 75th pick of the third round in the 1984 NFL draft and one of several NFL players who were able to play multiple positions as roster athletes in the NFL in those years.
