= August Curley =

American football player (born 1960)

No. 50
- Position: Linebacker

Personal information
- Born: January 24, 1960 (age 66); Little Rock, Arkansas, U.S.
- Listed height: 6 ft 3 in (1.91 m)
- Listed weight: 226 lb (103 kg)

Career information
- High school: Southwest (Atlanta, Georgia)
- College: USC (1978–1982)
- NFL draft: 1983: 4th round, 94th overall pick

Career history
- Detroit Lions (1983–1986)

Awards and highlights
- Coaches Poll national champion (1978)
- Stats at Pro Football Reference

August Onorato Curley (born January 24, 1960) is an American former professional football linebacker who played four seasons with the Detroit Lions of the National Football League (NFL). He was selected by the Lions in the fourth round of the 1983 NFL draft. He played college football at the University of Southern California.

== Early life and college ==
August Onorato Curley was born on January 24, 1960, in Little Rock, Arkansas. He attended Southwest High School in Atlanta, Georgia.

He was a member of the USC Trojans of the University of Southern California from 1978 to 1982 and a three-year letterman from 1980 to 1982. The 1978 Trojans were named Coaches Poll national champions. He recorded one interception in 1980. He totaled 115 tackles and one interception his junior year in 1981. He opened his senior season in 1982 with a 22-tackle game against the Florida Gators. However, he suffered an injury the next week that caused him to miss the rest of the season. Curley also had one interception in 1982.

== Professional career ==
Curley was selected by the Detroit Lions in the fourth round, with the 94th overall pick, of the 1983 NFL draft. He officially signed with the team on June 1. He played in ten games for the Lions during his rookie year in 1983 before being placed on injured reserve with a knee injury on November 9, 1983. The next year, he was placed on the physically unable to perform list on July 22, 1984, after re-aggravating his knee injury. He was later activated on October 24 and appeared in eight games during the 1984 season. Curley played in all 16 games, starting 14, for the Lions in 1985, recording 51 solo tackles, 24 assisted tackles, two pass breakups, and one forced fumble. The Lions finished the year with a 4–11–1 record. He was placed on injured reserve on September 1, 1986, and later activated on November 1, 1986. He played in four games in 1986. He became a free agent after the season.
