= Curtis Green =

American football player (born 1957)

No. 62
- Position: Defensive end

Personal information
- Born: June 3, 1957 (age 69); Quincy, Florida, U.S.
- Listed height: 6 ft 3 in (1.91 m)
- Listed weight: 256 lb (116 kg)

Career information
- High school: James A. Shanks
- College: Alabama State
- NFL draft: 1981: 2nd round, 46th overall pick

Career history
- Detroit Lions (1981–1989)

Awards and highlights
- PFWA All-Rookie Team (1981)

Career NFL statistics
- Sacks: 32
- Fumble recoveries: 3
- Stats at Pro Football Reference

Curtis Green (born June 3, 1957) is an American former professional football player who was a defensive end in the National Football League (NFL). Green was selected in the second round by the Detroit Lions out of Alabama State University in the 1981 NFL draft. He played nine seasons for the Lions.
