= Mark Nichols (wide receiver) =

American football player (born 1959)

No. 86
- Position: Wide receiver

Personal information
- Born: October 29, 1959 (age 67); Bakersfield, California, U.S.
- Listed height: 6 ft 2 in (1.88 m)
- Listed weight: 210 lb (95 kg)

Career information
- High school: Bakersfield (Bakersfield, California)
- College: San Jose State
- NFL draft: 1981: 1st round, 16th overall pick

Career history
- Detroit Lions (1981–1987)

Career NFL statistics
- Receptions: 124
- Receiving yards: 2,235
- Receiving touchdowns: 9
- Stats at Pro Football Reference

Mark Stephen Nichols (born October 10, 1959) is an American former professional football player who was a wide receiver in the National Football League (NFL). Nichols was selected 16th overall in the first round by the Detroit Lions out of San Jose State University in the 1981 NFL draft.

Nichols was inducted into the Bob Elias Kern County Sports Hall of Fame on February 11, 1988.
