= Steve Mott =

American football player (born 1961)

No. 52
- Position: Center

Personal information
- Born: March 24, 1961 (age 65); New Orleans, Louisiana, U.S.
- Listed height: 6 ft 3 in (1.91 m)
- Listed weight: 266 lb (121 kg)

Career information
- High school: Marrero (LA) Shaw
- College: Alabama
- NFL draft: 1983: 5th round, 121st overall pick

Career history
- Detroit Lions (1983–1989)

Awards and highlights
- First-team All-SEC (1982); Second-team All-SEC (1981)

Career NFL statistics
- Games played: 76
- Games started: 75
- Fumble recoveries: 1
- Stats at Pro Football Reference

Walter Stephen Mott III (born March 24, 1961) is an American former professional football player who was a center in the National Football League (NFL). He was selected by the Detroit Lions in the fifth round of the 1983 NFL draft, and he played for the team from 1983 to 1988. He played college football for the Alabama Crimson Tide. Mott was Coach Paul "Bear" Bryant's last captain. In 2009, two commemorative rings from his college football career were stolen but later recovered from a pawn shop after the arrest of some burglary suspects.
