= Scott Barrows =

American football player (born 1963)

No. 61
- Position: Guard

Personal information
- Born: March 31, 1963; Marietta, Ohio, U.S.
- Listed height: 6 ft 2 in (1.88 m)
- Listed weight: 278 lb (126 kg)

Career information
- High school: Marietta
- College: West Virginia
- NFL draft: 1985: undrafted

Career history
- Detroit Lions (1985–1988); Atlanta Falcons (1990)*
- * Offseason or practice squad member only

Awards and highlights
- 2× Second-team All-East (1983, 1984)

Career NFL statistics
- Games played: 44
- Games started: 15
- Fumble recoveries: 2
- Stats at Pro Football Reference

Scott Barrows (born March 31, 1963) is a former offensive lineman in the National Football League (NFL) for the Detroit Lions from 1986 to 1988. He was selected in the 1986 NFL draft out of West Virginia.
