= Bobby Watkins (cornerback) =

American football player (born 1960)

No. 27
- Position: Cornerback

Personal information
- Born: May 31, 1960 (age 66); Cottonwood, Idaho, U.S.
- Listed height: 5 ft 10 in (1.78 m)
- Listed weight: 184 lb (83 kg)

Career information
- High school: Bishop Dunne (Dallas, Texas)
- College: Texas State
- NFL draft: 1982: 2nd round, 42nd overall pick

Career history
- Detroit Lions (1982–1988); Miami Dolphins (1989)*
- * Offseason or practice squad member only

Awards and highlights
- PFWA All-Rookie Team (1982)

Career NFL statistics
- Interceptions: 20
- INT yards: 85
- Fumble recoveries: 6
- Stats at Pro Football Reference

Bobby Lawrence Watkins (born May 31, 1960) is an American former professional football player who was a cornerback in the National Football League (NFL). He played for the Detroit Lions after being selected in the second round of the 1982 NFL draft. He played college football for the Texas State Bobcats.

His son was a cornerback for Notre Dame.
