= William Graham (American football) =

American football player (born 1959)

No. 33
- Position: Safety

Personal information
- Born: September 27, 1959 (age 67); Silsbee, Texas, U.S.
- Listed height: 5 ft 11 in (1.80 m)
- Listed weight: 191 lb (87 kg)

Career information
- High school: Silsbee
- College: Texas
- NFL draft: 1982: 5th round, 127th overall pick

Career history
- Detroit Lions (1982–1987)

Career NFL statistics
- Interceptions: 6
- Sacks: 1
- Fumble recoveries: 6
- Stats at Pro Football Reference

William Roger Graham (born September 27, 1959) is an American former professional football player who was a safety for six seasons with the Detroit Lions of the National Football League (NFL). He played college football for the Texas Longhorns.

== Career ==
=== Collegiate ===
William Graham played defensive back at the University of Texas at Austin from 1979 to 1981. In 11 games with the Longhorns in 1980, he recorded four interceptions. In 11 games in 1981, he recorded seven more, tying the school record, leading the Southwest Conference and tied for third in the nation. His 11 career interceptions were fourth all-time at Texas.

=== Professional ===
Graham was selected in the fifth round by the Detroit Lions in the 1982 NFL draft. He played in seven games his rookie season, then fourteen (all but the first two, and all as a starter) in 1983 during which he recovered three fumbles as a free safety. In 1984, he started 13 of 14 games (missing two in late October due to an injury), recorded his first career interception in a Thanksgiving victory over Green Bay in week 13, and two more interceptions off former Lions quarterback Greg Landry in a season-finale loss to the Chicago Bears. In 1985, Graham started in all 16 games for the only time in his career. He again recorded three interceptions (including two in a week-11 victory over the Minnesota Vikings) and his only career sack. In 1987, Graham was no longer a starter, though he appeared in all 16 games and was used occasionally as a kickoff returner (three returns for 72 yards). He appeared in just two games in 1988, and was released at the end of the season. He is one of 16 players in Lions history with two or more multiple-interception games.
