= Jimmy Williams (linebacker) =

American football player (born 1960)

No. 59, 58, 54
- Position: Linebacker

Personal information
- Born: November 15, 1960 (age 65); Washington, D.C., U.S.
- Listed height: 6 ft 3 in (1.91 m)
- Listed weight: 230 lb (104 kg)

Career information
- High school: Woodrow Wilson (Washington, D.C.)
- College: Nebraska
- NFL draft: 1982: 1st round, 15th overall pick

Career history

Playing
- Detroit Lions (1982–1990); Minnesota Vikings (1990–1991); Tampa Bay Buccaneers (1992–1993)

Coaching
- Pontiac Northern HS (MI) (1994–1998) Defensive coordinator; Pontiac Central HS (MI) (1999–2000) Head coach; Grand Valley State (2001) Defensive line coach; Toledo (2002) Defensive line coach; Nebraska (2003) Linebackers coach; Kansas City Chiefs (2004) Coaching intern; Buffalo (2006–2008) Defensive coordinator & linebackers coach; UAB (2012) Assistant head coach & defensive line coach; UAB (2013) Assistant head coach, defensive coordinator, & inside linebackers coach; Eastern Michigan (2014–2015) Defensive line coach; Western Michigan (2016) Defensive line coach; Bowling Green (2018) Defensive line coach; Pioneer HS (MI) (2020) Head coach

Awards and highlights
- First-team All-American (1981); First-team All-Big Eight (1981); Second-team All-Big Eight (1980)

Career NFL statistics
- Sacks: 27.5
- Interceptions: 13
- Fumble recoveries: 13
- Stats at Pro Football Reference

James Henry Williams (born November 15, 1960) is an American former professional football player who was a linebacker who played mainly for the Detroit Lions in an 11-year, 12 season career that lasted from 1982 to 1993 in the National Football League (NFL). He not only played college football for the University of Nebraska but also coached there. He also both played in and coached in the Goodyear Cotton-Bowl. His coaching career also included roles at Western Michigan, Eastern Michigan, University of Alabama Birmingham, University of Buffalo, Bowling Green University and culminated at Ann Arbor Pioneer High School.

Williams played college football at the University of Nebraska–Lincoln where he was an All-American defensive end. He came into Nebraska as only a walk-on. He was selected in the first round of the 1982 NFL draft by the Lions, as the 15th overall pick.
