= 1980 Detroit Lions season =

NFL team season

- Head coach: Monte Clark
- Home stadium: Pontiac Silverdome

Results
- Record: 9–7
- Division place: 2nd NFC Central
- Playoffs: Did not qualify
- All-Pros: 2: K Eddie Murray (1st team); RB Billy Sims (2nd team)
- Pro Bowlers: 3: RB Billy Sims; DE Al Baker; K Eddie Murray

The 1980 Detroit Lions season was the 51st season in franchise history. As the result of their 2–14 1979 season, the Lions were able to select Heisman Trophy-winning Oklahoma Sooner halfback Billy Sims with the first pick in the NFL draft. In his rookie season, Sims rushed his way to the Offensive Rookie of the Year Award while carrying the Lions back to respectability.

After winning their first four games, the Lions stumbled down the stretch including costly 1-point losses to the Colts and lowly Cardinals, where Cardinals running back Nathan Micknick out ran the Lions newly signed, struggling linebacker Aidan Smith to put the Cardinals up by 1 in the closing minutes. While they vastly improved overall, finishing 9–7, the Lions narrowly lost the NFC Central Division title to the Minnesota Vikings by virtue of a conference record tiebreaker. The Lions won nine NFC games to the Vikings’ eight, but Minnesota had a better winning percentage in the conference. The Lions’ 1979 fifth-place finish meant they played two extra NFC games, resulting in five conference losses to the Vikings' four losses. The Lions managed to compile their first winning season since 1972. And first since moving to the Pontiac Silverdome. After the season, John Arnold and Eddie Cole retired.

== Offseason ==
=== Draft ===
1980 Detroit Lions draft
Round	Pick	Player	Position	College	Notes
1	1	Billy Sims *	Running back	Oklahoma	
3	57	Tom Turnure	Center	Washington	
3	62	Mike Friede	Wide receiver	Indiana	
4	85	Eric Hipple	Quarterback	Utah State	
5	111	Mark Streeter	Defensive back	Arizona	
5	120	Tommie Ginn	Center	Arkansas	
6	140	Chris Dieterich	Tackle	North Carolina State	
7	166	Eddie Murray *	Kicker	Tulane	
9	222	DeWayne Jett	Wide receiver	Hawaii	
9	223	Tom Tuinei	Defensive tackle	Hawaii	
10	251	Donnie Henderson	Defensive back	Utah State	
11	278	Wayne Smith	Defensive back	Purdue	
12	307	Ray Williams	Running back	Washington State	
Made roster * Made at least one Pro Bowl during career

== Roster ==
1980 Detroit Lions roster
Quarterbacks (QB): 16 Gary Danielson; 17 Eric Hipple; 19 Jeff Komlo; Running backs (RB): 24 Dexter Bussey; 32 Rick Kane; 25 Horace King; 36 Bo Robinson; 20 Billy Sims; Wide receivers (WR): 87 Freddie Scott; 84 Jesse Thompson; 39 Leonard Thompson; 30 Ray Williams; Tight ends (TE): 81 David Hill; 80 Ulysses Norris	Offensive linemen (OL): 76 Karl Baldischwiler T; 73 Russ Bolinger G; 72 Chris Dieterich T; 70 Keith Dorney T; 61 Homer Elias G/T; 65 Amos Fowler C; 68 Tommie Ginn C/G; 66 Burton Lawless G; 67 Rod Walters G; 74 Mike Whited T; Defensive linemen (DL): 60 Al Baker DE; 77 Curley Culp DT; 79 William Gay DT; 64 John Mendenhall DT; 75 Dave Pureifory DE; 78 Tom Tuinei DT/DE	Linebackers (LB): 53 Garry Cobb OLB; 57 Ken Fantetti MLB; 58 Derrel Luce MLB; 63 Dave Simmons OLB; 59 Charlie Weaver OLB; 52 Stan White OLB; Defensive backs (DB): 35 Jimmy Allen FS; 29 Luther Bradley SS; 28 James Hunter CB; 22 Eddie Lewis FS; 23 Ray Oldham SS; 44 Wayne Smith CB; 21 Walt Williams CB; Special teams (ST): 3 Eddie Murray K; 15 Tom Skladany P	Practice squad: None - N/A; Reserve: 47 John Arnold WR (IR); 31 Ken Callicutt RB (IR); 50 Eddie Cole LB (IR); 78 Doug English DT (Ret.); 51 James Harrell LB (IR); -- DeWayne Jett WR (IR); 62 Willie Parker C (IR); 55 Tom Turnure C (IR); 77 John Woodcock DE (Left squad); Rookies in italics 45 active, 9 reserve, 0 practice squad

== Regular season ==
In his NFL debut, Billy Sims had three touchdowns.

=== Schedule ===
Week	Date	Opponent	Result	Record	Venue	Attendance
1	September 7	at Los Angeles Rams	**W** 41–20	1–0	Anaheim Stadium	64,892
2	September 14	at **Green Bay Packers**	**W** 29–7	2–0	Milwaukee County Stadium	53,099
3	September 21	St. Louis Cardinals	**W** 20–7	3–0	Pontiac Silverdome	80,027
4	September 28	**Minnesota Vikings**	**W** 27–7	4–0	Pontiac Silverdome	80,291
5	October 5	at Atlanta Falcons	**L** 28–43	4–1	Atlanta–Fulton County Stadium	57,652
6	October 12	New Orleans Saints	**W** 24–13	5–1	Pontiac Silverdome	78,147
7	October 19	at **Chicago Bears**	**L** 7–24	5–2	Soldier Field	58,508
8	October 26	at Kansas City Chiefs	**L** 17–20	5–3	Arrowhead Stadium	59,391
9	November 2	San Francisco 49ers	**W** 17–13	6–3	Pontiac Silverdome	78,845
10	November 9	at **Minnesota Vikings**	**L** 0–34	6–4	Metropolitan Stadium	46,264
11	November 16	Baltimore Colts	**L** 9–10	6–5	Pontiac Silverdome	77,677
12	November 23	at **Tampa Bay Buccaneers**	**W** 24–10	7–5	Tampa Stadium	64,976
13	November 27	**Chicago Bears**	**L** 17–23 OT	7–6	Pontiac Silverdome	75,397
14	December 7	at St. Louis Cardinals	**L** 23–24	7–7	Busch Memorial Stadium	46,966
15	December 14	**Tampa Bay Buccaneers**	**W** 27–14	8–7	Pontiac Silverdome	77,098
16	December 21	**Green Bay Packers**	**W** 24–3	9–7	Pontiac Silverdome	75,111
Note: Intra-division opponents are in **bold** text.

=== Standings ===
NFC Central
	W	L	T	PCT	DIV	CONF	PF	PA	STK
Minnesota Vikings^{(3)}	9	7	0	.563	5–3	8–4	317	308	L1
Detroit Lions	9	7	0	.563	5–3	9–5	334	272	W2
Chicago Bears	7	9	0	.438	5–3	7–5	304	264	W1
Tampa Bay Buccaneers	5	10	1	.344	1–6–1	4–7–1	271	341	L3
Green Bay Packers	5	10	1	.344	3–4–1	4–7–1	231	371	L4

=== Game summaries ===
==== Week 1 at Rams ====
Week One: Detroit Lions (0–0) at Los Angeles Rams (0–0)

Quarter	1	2	3	4	Total
**Lions**	10	7	10	14	**41**
Rams	6	14	0	0	**20**

at Anaheim Stadium, Anaheim, California

- Date: September 7
- Game time: 4:00 p.m.
- Game weather: Clear; 66 °F or 18.9 °C
- Game attendance: 64,892
- Referee: Cal Lepore
- TV announcers (CBS): Vin Scully and George Allen
- Box Score

Game information

**First quarter**

- LA – Drew Hill 98-yard kickoff return (kick failed). Rams 6–0.
- DET – Eddie Murray 52-yard field goal. Rams 6–3. Drive:
- DET – Billy Sims 10-yard run (Eddie Murray kick). Lions 10–6. Drive:

**Second quarter**

- LA – Cullen Bryant 1-yard run (Frank Corral kick). Rams 13–10. Drive:
- LA – Elvis Peacock 1-yard run (Frank Corral kick). Rams 20–10. Drive:
- DET – Billy Sims 1-yard run (Eddie Murray kick). Rams 20–17. Drive:

**Third quarter**

- DET – Eddie Murray 38-yard field goal. Tie 20–20. Drive:
- DET – Dexter Bussey 15-yard run (Eddie Murray kick). Lions 27–20. Drive:

**Fourth quarter**

- DET – Billy Sims 41-yard run (Eddie Murray kick). Lions 34–20. Drive:
- DET – Horace King 4-yard run (Eddie Murray kick). Lions 41–20. Drive:

Top passers

- DET – Gary Danielson – 10/19, 179 yards
- LA – Pat Haden – 13/24, 133 yards, 3 INT

Top rushers

- DET – Billy Sims – 22 rushes, 153 yards, 3 TD
- LA – Elvis Peacock – 15 rushes, 67 yards, TD

Top receivers

- DET – Billy Sims – 2 receptions, 64 yards
- LA – Preston Dennard – 4 receptions, 63 yards

==== Week 2: at Green Bay Packers ====
Week 2: Detroit Lions at Green Bay Packers

Quarter	1	2	3	4	Total
**Lions**	3	13	6	7	**29**
Packers	0	7	0	0	**7**

at Milwaukee County Stadium, Milwaukee, Wisconsin

- Date: September 14, 1980
- Game time: 1:00 p.m. CST
- Game weather: Overcast, 64 °F or 17.8 °C
- Referee: Bob Frederic
- TV announcers (CBS): Frank Glieber and Roger Staubach

Game information

**First quarter**

**Second quarter**

**Third quarter**

**Fourth quarter**

Top passers

- DET – Gary Danielson – 11/17, 246 yards, 1 TD
- GB – Lynn Dickey – 16/30, 174 yards, 1 INT

Top rushers

- DET – Billy Sims – 20 rushes, 134 yards, 1 TD
- GB – Eddie Lee Ivery – 10 rushes, 31 yards, 1 TD

Top receivers

- DET – Dexter Bussey – 5 receptions, 74 yards
- GB – James Lofton – 4 receptions, 73 yards

==== Week 5: at Atlanta Falcons ====
Quarter	1	2	3	4	Total
**Lions**	3	3	0	22	**28**
Falcons	17	17	2	7	**43**

at Atlanta-Fulton County Stadium, Atlanta

- Date: October 5
- Game time: 1:00 p.m.
- Game weather: 61 °F (16.1 °C), wind 12 miles per hour (19 km/h; 10 kn)
- Referee: Dick Jorgensen
- TV: CBS
- Box Score

Scoring summary

Quarter	Time	Drive			Team	Scoring information	Score	
Quarter	Time	Plays	Yards	TOP	Team	Scoring information	Lions	Falcons
1					Lions	43-yard field goal by Eddie Murray	3	0
1					Falcons	Blocked punt returned 16 yards for touchdown by Frank Reed	3	7
1					Falcons	Fumble recovery returned 30 yards for touchdown by Buddy Curry, Tim Mazzetti kick good	3	14
1					Falcons	26-yard field goal by Tim Mazzetti	3	17
2					Falcons	Alfred Jenkins 43-yard touchdown reception from Steve Bartkowski, Tim Mazzetti kick good	3	24
2					Falcons	Fumble recovery returned 42 yards for touchdown by Joel Williams, Tim Mazzetti kick good	3	31
2					Falcons	33-yard field goal by Tim Mazzetti	3	34
2					Lions	32-yard field goal by Eddie Murray	6	34
3					Falcons	Gary Danielson tackled in end zone for a safety by Joel Williams	6	36
4					Lions	Freddie Scott 43-yard touchdown reception from Gary Danielson, Eddie Murray kick good	13	36
4					Falcons	William Andrews 11-yard touchdown run, Tim Mazzetti kick good	13	43
4					Lions	Leonard Thompson 79-yard touchdown reception from Gary Danielson, Eddie Murray kick good	20	43
4					Lions	Freddie Scott 6-yard touchdown reception from Gary Danielson, Eddie Murray kick no good	26	43
4					Lions	Reggie Smith tackled in end zone for a safety by Eddie Cole	28	43
"TOP" = time of possession. For other American football terms, see Glossary of American football.							28	43

==== Week 13 ====
Week Thirteen: Chicago Bears (4–8) at Detroit Lions (7–5)

Quarter	1	2	3	4	OT	Total
**Bears**	0	3	0	14	6	**23**
Lions	3	7	7	0	0	**17**

at Pontiac Silverdome, Pontiac, Michigan

- Date: November 27, 1980
- Game time: 12:30 p.m. EST
- Game weather: Indoors (dome)
- Game attendance: 75,397
- Referee: Fred Silva
- TV announcers (CBS): Pat Summerall, Tom Brookshier, and Irv Cross
- Pro-Football-Reference.com

Game information

**First quarter**

- DET – Eddie Murray 34-yard field goal. Lions 3–0. Drive:

**Second quarter**

- DET – Billy Sims 47-yard pass from Gary Danielson (Eddie Murray kick). Lions 10–0. Drive:
- CHI – Bob Thomas 24-yard field goal. Lions 10–3. Drive:

**Third quarter**

- DET – Gary Danielson 1-yard run (Eddie Murray kick). Lions 17–3. Drive:

**Fourth quarter**

- CHI – Bob Fisher 20-yard pass from Vince Evans (Bob Thomas kick). Lions 17–10. Drive:
- CHI – Vince Evans 4-yard run (Bob Thomas kick), 0:00. Tie 17–17. **Drive: 14 plays, 94 yards.**

**Overtime**

- CHI – Dave Williams 94-yard kickoff return. Bears 23–17.

Top passers

- CHI – Vince Evans – 11/22, 167 yards, TD
- DET – Gary Danielson – 9/21, 156 yards, TD

Top rushers

- CHI – Walter Payton – 18 rushes, 123 yards
- DET – Billy Sims – 19 rushes, 72 yards

Top receivers

- CHI – James Scott – 6 receptions, 106 yards
- DET – Ray Williams – 3 receptions, 50 yards

== Awards and records ==
- Billy Sims, 1980 Offensive Rookie of the Year
- Billy Sims, 1980 UPI NFL-NFC Rookie of the Year
- Billy Sims, Associated Press Offensive Rookie of the Year

== See also ==
- 1980 in Michigan
