= 1981 Detroit Lions season =

NFL team season

- Head coach: Monte Clark
- Home stadium: Pontiac Silverdome

Results
- Record: 8–8
- Division place: 2nd NFC Central
- Playoffs: Did not qualify
- All-Pros: 2: RB Billy Sims (2nd team); DT Doug English (2nd team)
- Pro Bowlers: 2: RB Billy Sims; DT Doug English

The 1981 Detroit Lions season was their 52nd in the league. The team failed to improve upon their previous season's record of 9–7, winning eight games. The Lions started off the first four games even at 2–2. In the fourth game of the season, starting quarterback Gary Danielson suffered a dislocated wrist, which ended his season. Backup quarterback Jeff Komlo finished the game and was named the starter for the next week. In the next two games, Komlo struggled. The Lions lost both of those games. Head Coach Monte Clark made the decision to give third-string quarterback Eric Hipple start on a Monday Night game against the Chicago Bears. In front of approximately 71,000 fans, Clark's gamble paid off as the Lions defeated the Bears 48–17.

Star halfback Billy Sims continued to play solid football, amassing 1,888 total yards in total offense while scoring a team-high 14 touchdowns. The Lions had a chance to win the division on the last day against Tampa Bay, but lost and finished in second place in the NFC Central with an 8–8 record. The team missed the playoffs for the eleventh straight season. After the season, Jimmy Allen and Luther Bradley retired.

== Offseason ==
=== NFL draft ===
1981 Detroit Lions Draft
Draft order		Player name	Position	College
Round	Selection	Player name	Position	College
1	16	Mark Nichols	WR	San Jose State
2	46	Curtis Green	DE	Alabama State
3	72	Don Greco	G	Western Illinois
4	99	Tracy Porter	WR	LSU
5	129	Larry Lee	DE	North Carolina State
6	155	Sam Johnson	DB	Maryland
7	182	Lee Spivey	OT	SMU
8	211	Bob Niziolek	TE	Colorado
9	238	Hugh Jernigan	DB	Arkansas
9	240	Dave Martin	DB	Villanova
10	264	Andy Cannavino	LB	Michigan
11	294	Willie Jackson	DB	Mississippi State

=== Undrafted free agents ===
1981 undrafted free agents of note
Player	Position	College
Bob Stachowicz	Quarterback	Michigan State

== Roster ==
1981 Detroit Lions roster
Quarterbacks (QB): 16 Gary Danielson; 17 Eric Hipple; 19 Jeff Komlo; Running backs (RB): 24 Dexter Bussey; 31 Ken Callicutt; 32 Rick Kane; 25 Horace King; 20 Billy Sims; 38 Vince Thompson; Wide receivers (WR): 83 Robbie Martin; 86 Mark Nichols; 89 Tracy Porter; 87 Freddie Scott; 39 Leonard Thompson; Tight ends (TE): 81 David Hill; 80 Ulysses Norris	Offensive linemen (OL): 76 Karl Baldischwiler T; 73 Russ Bolinger G; 70 Keith Dorney T; 61 Homer Elias G; 65 Amos Fowler C; 68 Tommie Ginn G; 64 Larry Lee G/C; 55 Tom Turnure C; Defensive linemen (DL): 60 Al Baker DE; 74 Joe Ehrmann DT; 78 Doug English DT; 71 Steve Furness DT; 79 William Gay DT; 62 Curtis Green DE; 75 Dave Pureifory DE	Linebackers (LB): 53 Garry Cobb OLB; 57 Ken Fantetti MLB; 51 James Harrell OLB; 50 Terry Tautolo MLB; 52 Stan White OLB; Defensive backs (DB): 40 Jimmy Allen FS; 27 Luther Bradley SS; 26 Hector Gray CB; 35 Alvin Hall FS; 28 James Hunter CB; 23 Ray Oldham SS; 44 Wayne Smith CB; Special teams (ST): 3 Eddie Murray K; 1 Tom Skladany P	Reserve: 77 Curley Culp DT (IR); 72 Chris Dieterich T (IR); 67 Don Greco G (IR); -- Willie Jackson CB (IR); -- DeWayne Jett WR (IR); 84 Jesse Thompson WR (IR); 54 Steve Towle LB (IR); 30 Ray Williams WR (IR); Rookies in italics

== Schedule ==
Week	Date	Opponent	Result	Record	Attendance
1	September 6	San Francisco 49ers	**W** 24–17	1–0	63,710
2	September 13	at San Diego Chargers	**L** 28–23	1–1	51,264
3	September 20	at **Minnesota Vikings**	**L** 26–24	1–2	45,350
4	September 27	Oakland Raiders	**W** 16–0	2–2	77,919
5	October 4	at **Tampa Bay Buccaneers**	**L** 28–10	2–3	71,733
6	October 11	at Denver Broncos	**L** 27–21	2–4	74,816
7	October 19	**Chicago Bears**	**W** 48–17	3–4	71,273
8	October 25	**Green Bay Packers**	**W** 31–27	4–4	76,063
9	November 1	at Los Angeles Rams	**L** 20–13	4–5	61,814
10	November 8	at Washington Redskins	**L** 33–31	4–6	52,096
11	November 15	Dallas Cowboys	**W** 27–24	5–6	79,694
12	November 22	at **Chicago Bears**	**W** 23–7	6–6	50,082
13	November 26	Kansas City Chiefs	**W** 27–10	7–6	76,735
14	December 6	at **Green Bay Packers**	**L** 31–17	7–7	54,481
15	December 12	**Minnesota Vikings**	**W** 45–7	8–7	79,428
16	December 20	**Tampa Bay Buccaneers**	**L** 20–17	8–8	80,444
Note: Intra-division games are in **bold** text

=== Week 13 ===
Team	1	2	3	4	Total
Chiefs	7	0	3	0	10
• Lions	7	10	3	7	27

- Date: November 26
- Location: Pontiac Silverdome, Pontiac, Michigan
- Game start: 12:30 p.m.
- Game weather: Indoors (dome)
- TV announcers (NBC): Dick Enberg and Merlin Olsen

Scoring summary
1	DET	David Hill 10 yard pass from Eric Hipple (Eddie Murray kick)	DET 7–0
1	KC	Billy Jackson 4 yard run (Nick Lowery kick)	Tie 7–7
2	DET	Eddie Murray 34 yard field goal	DET 10–7
2	DET	Freddie Scott 40 yard pass from Eric Hipple (Eddie Murray kick)	DET 17–7
3	KC	Nick Lowery 33 yard field goal	DET 17–10
3	DET	Eddie Murray 46 yard field goal	DET 20–10
4	DET	Billy Sims 4 yard run (Eddie Murray kick)	DET 27–10

=== Standings ===
NFC Central
	W	L	T	PCT	DIV	CONF	PF	PA	STK
Tampa Bay Buccaneers^{(3)}	9	7	0	.563	6–2	9–3	315	268	W1
Detroit Lions	8	8	0	.500	4–4	6–6	397	322	L1
Green Bay Packers	8	8	0	.500	4–4	7–7	324	361	L1
Minnesota Vikings	7	9	0	.438	4–4	6–6	325	369	L5
Chicago Bears	6	10	0	.375	2–6	2–10	253	324	W3
