= 1979 Detroit Lions season =

NFL team season

- Head coach: Monte Clark
- Home stadium: Pontiac Silverdome

Results
- Record: 2–14
- Division place: 5th NFC Central
- Playoffs: Did not qualify
- All-Pros: none
- Pro Bowlers: TE David Hill; DE Al Baker

The 1979 Detroit Lions season was the 50th season in franchise history. In the midst of a major rebuilding project, the woeful Lions finished the season with a 2–14 record, equal-worst record in the NFL and a tiebreaker with the 49ers gave the Lions the first pick overall in the 1980 NFL Draft. Detroit entered the year as a favorite in the NFC Central, but a season-ending injury to quarterback Gary Danielson in the preseason forced the Lions to ultimately turn to a rookie ninth-round pick, Jeff Komlo, behind center, with disastrous results. After the season, Nate Allen and Karl Chandler retired.

== Offseason ==
=== NFL draft ===
1979 Detroit Lions draft
Round	Pick	Player	Position	College	Notes
1	10	Keith Dorney *	Tackle	Penn State	
2	37	Ken Fantetti	Linebacker	Wyoming	
3	67	Bo Robinson	Running back	West Texas A&M	
4	88	Ulysses Norris	Tight end	Georgia	
4	92	Jon Brooks	Linebacker	Clemson	
5	131	Walt Brown	Center	Pittsburgh	
8	213	John Mohring	Linebacker	C.W. Post	
9	231	Jeff Komlo	Quarterback	Delaware	
11	302	Eddie Cole	Linebacker	Mississippi	
12	313	Bob Forester	Center	Brown	
12	326	Bryan Sweeney	Wide receiver	Texas A&M-Kingsville	
Made roster

=== Undrafted free agents ===
1979 undrafted free agents of note
Player	Position	College
John Arnold	Wide receiver	Wyoming
Reggie Arnold	Wide receiver	Purdue
Rade Savich	Kicker	Central Michigan

== Roster ==
1979 Detroit Lions roster
Quarterbacks (QB): 10 Scott Hunter; 19 Jeff Komlo; 14 Joe Reed; Running backs (RB): 24 Dexter Bussey; 31 Ken Callicutt; 38 Lawrence Gaines; 32 Rick Kane; 25 Horace King; 36 Bo Robinson; Wide receivers (WR): 47 John Arnold; 87 Freddie Scott; 39 Leonard Thompson; 18 Gene Washington; Tight ends (TE): 81 David Hill; 80 Ulysses Norris	Offensive linemen (OL): 76 Karl Baldischwiler T; 73 Russ Bolinger G; 70 Keith Dorney T; 61 Homer Elias G; 58 Dennis Franks C; 65 Amos Fowler G; 62 Don Morrison T; 67 Wally Pesuit C/G; Defensive linemen (DL): 60 Al Baker DE; 78 Doug English DT; 71 Dave Gallagher DT; 79 William Gay DE; 75 Dave Pureifory DE	Linebackers (LB): 53 Jon Brooks OLB; 50 Eddie Cole MLB; 63 Garry Cobb OLB; 57 Ken Fantetti MLB; 51 James Harrell OLB; 55 Ed O'Neil OLB; Defensive backs (DB): 40 Jimmy Allen SS; 42 Nate Allen CB; 27 Luther Bradley CB; 28 James Hunter CB/S; 48 Eddie Lewis CB; 44 Dave Parkin FS; 43 Don Patterson CB; 46 Jimmy Stewart SS; Special teams (ST): 1 Benny Ricardo K; 15 Tom Skladany P; 12 Larry Swider P	Reserve: 89 Luther Blue WR (IR); 16 Gary Danielson QB (IR); 72 Cleveland Elam DT (IR); 64 Dan Gray DE (IR); 26 Tony Leonard CB (IR); 68 Mark Markovich C (PUP); —- John Mohring LB (IR); 54 Larry Tearry C (IR); 84 Jesse Thompson WR (IR); 52 Dave Washington LB (IR); 59 Charlie Weaver LB (IR); 21 Walt Williams CB (IR); 77 John Woodcock DT (PUP); Rookies in italics

== Regular season ==
=== Schedule ===
Week	Date	Opponent	Result	Record	Attendance
1	September 1	at **Tampa Bay Buccaneers**	**L** 31–16	0—1	68,225
2	September 9	Washington Redskins	**L** 27–24	0—2	54,991
3	September 16	at New York Jets	**L** 31–10	0—3	49,612
4	September 23	Atlanta Falcons	**W** 24–23	1—3	56,249
5	September 30	**Minnesota Vikings**	**L** 13–10	1—4	75,295
6	October 7	at New England Patriots	**L** 24–17	1—5	60,629
7	October 14	at **Green Bay Packers**	**L** 24–16	1—6	53,930
8	October 21	at New Orleans Saints	**L** 17–7	1—7	57,428
9	October 28	Buffalo Bills	**L** 20–17	1—8	61,911
10	November 4	at **Chicago Bears**	**L** 35–7	1—9	50,108
11	November 11	**Tampa Bay Buccaneers**	**L** 16–14	1—10	70,461
12	November 18	at **Minnesota Vikings**	**L** 14–7	1—11	43,650
13	November 22	**Chicago Bears**	**W** 20–0	2—11	66,219
14	December 2	at Philadelphia Eagles	**L** 44–7	2—12	66,128
15	December 9	Miami Dolphins	**L** 28–10	2—13	78,087
16	December 15	**Green Bay Packers**	**L** 18–13	2—14	57,376

Note: Intra-division opponents are in bold text.

=== Standings ===
NFC Central
	W	L	T	PCT	DIV	CONF	PF	PA	STK
Tampa Bay Buccaneers^{(2)}	10	6	0	.625	6–2	8–6	273	237	W1
Chicago Bears^{(5)}	10	6	0	.625	5–3	8–4	306	249	W3
Minnesota Vikings	7	9	0	.438	5–3	6–6	259	337	L1
Green Bay Packers	5	11	0	.313	3–5	4–8	246	316	W1
Detroit Lions	2	14	0	.125	1–7	2–10	219	365	L3

== Player stats ==
=== Passing ===
Player	Games	Completions	Attempts	Yards	Touchdowns	Interceptions	Rating
Jeff Komlo	16	183	368	2238	11	23	52.8
Scott Hunter	13	18	41	321	1	1	69.3
Joe Reed	2	14	32	164	2	1	67.7
Jerry Golsteyn	1	2	9	16	0	2	0.0
Tom Skladany	2	0	1	0	0	0	28.6
Larry Swider	14	1	1	36	0	0	118.7

=== Rushing ===
Player	Games	Attempts	Yards	Touchdowns	Longest rush
Dexter Bussey	16	144	625	1	38
Rick Kane	16	94	332	4	26
Bo Robinson	14	87	302	2	29
Horace King	16	39	160	1	23
Jeff Komlo	16	30	107	2	16
Lawrence Gaines	16	23	55	0	6
Freddie Scott	14	6	21	0	18
Leonard Thompson	15	5	24	0	16
Ken Callicut	16	3	6	0	10
Scott Hunter	13	2	3	1	2
Joe Reed	2	2	11	0	11
David Hill	16	1	15	0	15
Gene A. Washington	16	1	24	0	24
Luther Blue	9	1	−8	0	−8
Jerry Golsteyn	1	1	0	0	0
Ed O'Neil	16	1	0	0	0
Larry Swider	14	1	0	0	0

=== Receiving ===
Note: Rec = Receptions; Yds = Yards; Avg = Average Yards per Reception; TD = Touchdowns

Player	Games	Receptions	Yards	Average yards per reception	Touchdowns	Longest
Freddie Scott	14	62	929	15.0	5	50
David Hill	16	47	569	12.1	3	40
Leonard Thompson	15	24	451	18.8	2	82
Horace King	16	18	150	8.3	0	30
Dexter Bussey	16	15	102	6.8	0	22
Gene A. Washington	16	14	192	13.7	1	29
Bo Robinson	14	14	118	8.4	0	14
Rick Kane	16	9	104	11.6	1	36
Luther Blue	9	8	102	12.8	1	26
Ulysses Norris	16	4	43	10.8	1	34
Ken Callicutt	16	2	16	8.0	0	11
Russ Bolinger	16	1	−1	−1.0	0	−1
