= 1979 Green Bay Packers season =

NFL team season

- Head coach: Bart Starr
- Home stadium: Lambeau Field; Milwaukee County Stadium

Results
- Record: 5–11
- Division place: 4th NFC Central
- Playoffs: Did not qualify

The 1979 Green Bay Packers season was their 61st season overall and their 59th in the National Football League. The team posted a 5–11 record under coach Bart Starr, earning them a fourth-place finish in the NFC Central division. The offense was still one of the worst in the NFL and the defense could not pick up the slack, ending with the least effective defense against the run.

The only notable win the Packers had was a 27–14 victory on a Monday night against the New England Patriots, the first night game at Lambeau Field (previous night games had to be played at Milwaukee County Stadium, since Lambeau Field's original light standards were insufficient for night broadcasts). The Packers also defeated the archrival Minnesota Vikings at home for the first time since 1970.

== Offseason ==
=== Draft ===
1979 Green Bay Packers draft
Round	Pick	Player	Position	College	Notes
1	15	Eddie Lee Ivery	Running back	Georgia Tech	
2	44	Steve Atkins	Running back	Maryland	
3	71	Charles Johnson	Defensive tackle	Maryland	
6	153	Dave Simmons	Linebacker	North Carolina	
7	184	Rich Wingo	Linebacker	Alabama	
8	193	Ron Cassidy	Wide receiver	Utah State	
9	235	John Thompson	Tight end	Utah State	
10	264	Frank Lockett	Wide Receiver	Nebraska	
11	290	Mark Thorson	Defensive back	Ottawa	
12	318	Bill Moats	Punter	South Dakota	
Made roster

=== Undrafted free agents ===
1979 undrafted free agents of note
Player	Position	College
Varian Bristow	Tight end	Johnson C. Smith
Steve Brothers	Defensive back	Baylor
Kyle Grossart	Quarterback	Oregon State
Carlos Henderson	Defensive back	Eastern Michigan
Randy Hughley	Linebacker	Wyoming
Bobby Kimball	Wide Receiver	Oklahoma
John Kelly	Tight end	C. W. Post
Vince McCoy	Tight end	Tennessee State
Scott O'Brien	Defensive end	Wisconsin–Superior
James Pickens	Defensive Back	Michigan
Michael Rieker	Quarterback	Lehigh
Ron Smith	Linebacker	Clemson
Bob Unruh	Kicker	Wheaton

== Roster and Coaches ==
=== Staff ===
1979 Green Bay Packers staff
Front office: President – Dominic Olejniczak; Vice President – Robert J. Parins; Corporate General Manager – Bob Harlan; Director of Player Personnel – Dick Corrick; Head coaches: Head Coach/General Manager – Bart Starr; Offensive coaches: Quarterbacks – Zeke Bratkowski; Offensive Line – Bill Curry & Ernie McMillan; Receivers – Lew Carpenter	Defensive coaches: Defensive Coordinator/Asst. Head Coach – Dave Hanner; Defensive Line – Fred von Appen; Linebackers – John Meyer; Defensive Backs – Dick LeBeau; Special teams coaches: Special Teams – Dick Rehbein

=== Roster ===
1979 Green Bay Packers roster
Quarterbacks (QB): 10 Lynn Dickey; 17 David Whitehurst; Running backs (RB): 42 Walt Landers; 34 Terdell Middleton; 30 Ricky Patton; 48 Nate Simpson; 26 Eric Torkelson; Wide receivers (WR): 88 Ron Cassidy; 80 James Lofton; 89 Aundra Thompson; 87 Walter Tullis; Tight ends (TE): 82 Paul Coffman; 83 John Thompson	Offensive linemen (OL): 57 Derrel Gofourth G; 69 Leotis Harris G; 71 Melvin Jackson G; 63 Greg Koch T; 79 Mark Koncar T; 54 Larry McCarren C; 76 Tim Stokes T; 65 Mike Wellman C; 73 Steve Young T; Defensive linemen (DL): 70 Bob Barber DE; 77 Mike Butler DE; 99 Charles Johnson DT; 90 Ezra Johnson DE; 63 Terry Jones DT; 72 Kit Lathrop DT	Linebackers (LB): 59 John Anderson OLB; 53 Mike Douglass OLB; 51 Jim Gueno OLB; 62 Joe McLaughlin MLB; 58 Paul Rudzinski MLB; 61 Dave Simmons OLB; 52 Gary Weaver OLB; 50 Rich Wingo MLB; Defensive backs (DB): 24 Johnnie Gray FS; 38 Estus Hood CB; 46 Steve Luke SS; 29 Mike McCoy CB; 36 Howard Sampson CB/S; 20 Wylie Turner CB; 21 Steve Wagner SS; Special teams (ST): 11 David Beverly P; 19 Tom Birney K	Reserve: 32 Steve Atkins RB (IR); 75 Carl Barzilauskas DT (IR); 55 Mike Hunt LB (IR); 40 Eddie Lee Ivery RB (IR); 39 Sammy Johnson RB (IR); 85 Bobby Kimball WR (IR); 13 Chester Marcol K (IR); 78 Casey Merrill DE/DT (IR); 56 Rick Nuzum C (IR); 33 Barty Smith RB (IR); 47 Mark Thorson S (IR); Rookies in italics

== Regular season ==
=== Schedule ===
Week	Opponent	Result	Record	Venue	Attendance
1	at Chicago Bears	L 3–6	Soldier Field	0–1	56,515
2	New Orleans Saints	W 28–19	Milwaukee County Stadium	1–1	53,184
3	Tampa Bay Buccaneers	L 21–10	Lambeau Field	1–2	55,498
4	at Minnesota Vikings	L 27–21 (OT)	Metropolitan Stadium	1–3	46,524
5	New England Patriots	W 27–14	Lambeau Field	2–3	52,842
6	at Atlanta Falcons	L 7–25	Atlanta–Fulton County Stadium	2–4	56,184
7	Detroit Lions	W 24–16	Milwaukee County Stadium	3–4	53,930
8	at Tampa Bay Buccaneers	L 3–21	Tampa Stadium	3–5	67,186
9	at Miami Dolphins	L 7–27	Orange Bowl	3–6	47,741
10	New York Jets	L 22–27	Lambeau Field	3–7	54,201
11	Minnesota Vikings	W 19–7	Milwaukee County Stadium	4–7	52,706
12	at Buffalo Bills	L 12–19	Rich Stadium	4–8	39,679
13	Philadelphia Eagles	L 10–21	Lambeau Field	4–9	50,023
14	at Washington Redskins	L 21–38	RFK Stadium	4–10	51,682
15	Chicago Bears	L 14–15	Lambeau Field	4–11	54,207
16	at Detroit Lions	W 18–13	Pontiac Silverdome	5–11	57,376

=== Season summary ===
==== Week 2: vs. New Orleans Saints ====
Week 2: New Orleans Saints at Green Bay Packers

Quarter	1	2	3	4	Total
Saints	3	9	0	7	19
Packers	0	0	21	7	28

at Milwaukee County Stadium, Milwaukee, Wisconsin

- Date: September 9, 1979
- Game time: 12:00 p.m. CST
- Game weather: Overcast, 60 °F (16 °C)
- TV announcers (CBS): Curt Gowdy and Hank Stram

Game information

First quarter

Second quarter

Third quarter

Fourth quarter

Top passers

- GB – David Whitehurst – 9/15, 139 yards, INT
- NO – Archie Manning – 28/45, 291 yards, TD, 2 INT

Top rushers

- GB – Steve Atkins – 12 rushes, 110 yards, TD
- NO – Tony Galbreath – 15 rushes, 82 yards

Top receivers

- GB – James Lofton – 2 receptions, 64 yards
- NO – Henry Childs – 7 receptions, 112 yards, TD

==== Week 15: vs. Chicago Bears ====
Week 15: Chicago Bears at Green Bay Packers

Quarter	1	2	3	4	Total
Bears	3	3	0	9	15
Packers	0	7	0	7	14

at Lambeau Field, Green Bay, Wisconsin

- Date: December 9, 1979
- Game time: 1:00 p.m. CST
- Game weather: Overcast, 29 °F (−2 °C)
- TV announcers (CBS): Pat Summerall and Sonny Jurgensen

Game information

First quarter

Second quarter

Third quarter

Fourth quarter

Top passers

- CHI – Mike Phipps – 10/25, 113 yards, 1 INT
- GB – Lynn Dickey – 20/37, 283 yards, 2 TD, 2 INT

Top rushers

- CHI – Walter Payton – 25 rushes, 115 yards
- GB – Ricky Patton – 18 rushes, 35 yards

Top receivers

- CHI – Rickey Watts – 4 receptions, 68 yards
- GB – James Lofton – 6 receptions, 112 yards, 1 TD

=== Standings ===
NFC Central
	W	L	T	PCT	DIV	CONF	PF	PA	STK
^{(2)} Tampa Bay Buccaneers	10	6	0	.625	6–2	8–6	273	237	W1
^{(5)} Chicago Bears	10	6	0	.625	5–3	8–4	306	249	W3
Minnesota Vikings	7	9	0	.438	5–3	6–6	259	337	L1
Green Bay Packers	5	11	0	.313	3–5	4–8	246	316	W1
Detroit Lions	2	14	0	.125	1–7	2–10	219	365	L3

== In popular media ==
The Packers versus Bears game of week 15 was used in an episode of That '70s Show ("Street Fighting Man") and was part of the seventh season. Eric invites his father, Red, to the game at Lambeau Field. Oddly, the Packers win in this episode, as opposed to real life, where they lost. Eric refers to the Bears as the "underdogs", when the Packers would have likely been the underdogs in the game, since the Packers were 4–10 heading into the game and the Bears were 9–5 heading to the game.
