= Tuinei =

Tuinei is a surname. Notable people with the surname include:

- Lavasier Tuinei (born 1990), American football player
- Mark Tuinei (1960–1999), American football player
- Tom Tuinei (born 1958), American football player
- Van Tuinei (born 1971), American football player
