= Freddie Scott (American football, born 1952) =

American football player

- Scott in 1977

No. 86, 87
- Position: Wide receiver

Personal information
- Born: August 5, 1952 (age 74); Grady, Arkansas, U.S.
- Listed height: 6 ft 2 in (1.88 m)
- Listed weight: 180 lb (82 kg)

Career information
- College: Amherst
- NFL draft: 1974: 7th round, 174th overall pick

Career history
- Baltimore Colts (1974–1977); Detroit Lions (1978–1983); Los Angeles Express (USFL) (1984)

Career NFL statistics
- Games played: 132
- Receptions: 262
- Receiving yards: 4,270
- Receiving touchdowns: 20
- Stats at Pro Football Reference
- College Football Hall of Fame

Freddie Lee Scott (born August 5, 1952) is an American former professional football player who was a wide receiver from 1974 through 1983 in the National Football League (NFL} as well as a season in the USFL in 1984 for the Los Angeles Express. In 2001, he was inducted into the College Football Hall of Fame.

Scott was a starter replacing the injured Roger Carr with the Baltimore Colts in 1977. He was traded along with a fourth-round draft selection (107th overall) which eventually became Homer Elias from the Colts to the Detroit Lions for Herb Orvis on May 1, 1978.

His son Freddie Scott Jr. also played wide receiver for Penn State University, and in the NFL from 1996 through 1998 for the Detroit Lions and the Indianapolis Colts. Another son, Brandon Scott, played for Bowling Green State University.

== NFL career statistics ==
Legend
**Bold**	Career high

=== Regular season ===
Year	Team	Games		Receiving				
Year	Team	GP	GS	Rec	Yds	Avg	Lng	TD
1974	BAL	14	2	18	317	17.6	45	0
1975	BAL	8	0	0	0	0.0	0	0
1976	BAL	10	0	3	35	11.7	18	0
1977	BAL	14	14	18	267	14.8	33	2
1978	DET	**16**	13	37	564	15.2	47	2
1979	DET	14	14	**62**	929	15.0	**50**	**5**
1980	DET	**16**	**16**	53	834	15.7	43	4
1981	DET	**16**	15	53	**1,022**	**19.3**	48	**5**
1982	DET	9	7	13	231	17.8	36	1
1983	DET	15	0	5	71	14.2	25	1
		132	81	262	4,270	16.3	50	20

=== Playoffs ===
Year	Team	Games		Receiving				
Year	Team	GP	GS	Rec	Yds	Avg	Lng	TD
1976	BAL	**1**	0	0	0	0.0	0	0
1977	BAL	**1**	**1**	2	**45**	**22.5**	**26**	0
1982	DET	**1**	0	1	14	14.0	14	0
1983	DET	**1**	0	**3**	29	9.7	13	0
		4	1	6	88	14.7	26	0
