= 1979 Minnesota Vikings season =

NFL team season

- General manager: Mike Lynn
- Head coach: Bud Grant
- Home stadium: Metropolitan Stadium

Results
- Record: 7–9
- Division place: 3rd NFC Central
- Playoffs: Did not qualify
- Pro Bowlers: LB Matt Blair; WR Ahmad Rashad

Uniform
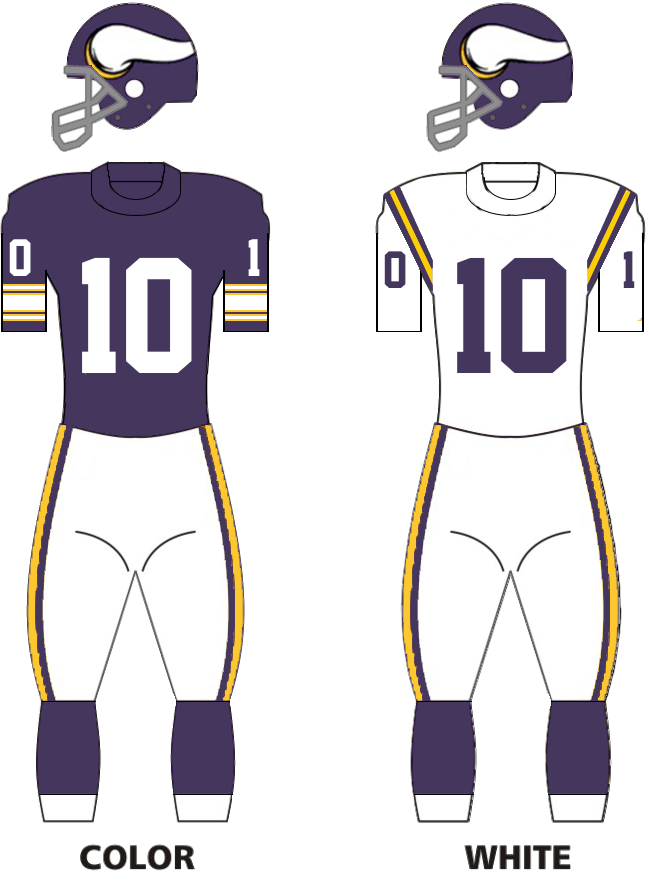

The 1979 season was the Minnesota Vikings' 19th in the National Football League. The Vikings finished with a 7–9 record, their first losing season since 1967, and missed the playoffs for the first time since 1972.

The loss of Fran Tarkenton to retirement in the off-season meant third-year quarterback Tommy Kramer became the starter. The season also marked the end of an era as the last remaining original Viking, longtime defensive end Jim Marshall, retired after 19 seasons with the Vikings and 20 in the NFL, having set league records for most consecutive games played (282) and consecutive starts (270). Counting playoff games, he had started in every one of the 289 games in Vikings history. Safety Paul Krause also retired after the season ended; he holds the league record with 81 career interceptions.

== Offseason ==
=== 1979 draft ===
Pro Bowler

1979 Minnesota Vikings Draft
Draft order		Player name	Position	College	Notes
Round	Selection	Player name	Position	College	Notes
1	16	Ted Brown	Running back	NC State	
2	43	Dave Huffman	Center	Notre Dame	
3	72	Selection forfeited due to illegal tryout (Note: The details of this forfeited pick are unknown.)			
4	97	Steve Dils	Quarterback	Stanford	
5	129	Jerry Meter	Linebacker	Michigan	
6	152	Joe Senser	Tight end	West Chester	
7	181	Bob Winkel	Defensive tackle	Kentucky	
8	207	Traded to the Baltimore Colts (Note: The Vikings traded an eighth-round selection (207th overall) to the Baltimore Colts in exchange for OT Frank Myers.)			
9	236	Billy Diggs	Wide receiver	Winston-Salem State	
10	263	Traded to the New York Jets (Note: The Vikings traded a 10th-round selection (263rd overall) and a 1978 eighth-round selection (213th overall) to the New York Jets in exchange for S Phil Wise.)			
11	291	Brian Nelson	Wide receiver	Texas Tech	
12	317	David Stephens	Linebacker	Kentucky	

=== Undrafted free agents ===
1979 undrafted free agents of note
Player	Position	College
Douglas Cunningham	Wide receiver	Rice
Steve Gortz	Punter	UNLV
Kyle Heinrich	Safety	Washington
Perry Kozlowski	Safety	North Dakota State
Keith Nord	Safety	St. Cloud State
Tony Norman	Defensive end	Iowa State
Sammy Steinmark	Safety	Wyoming
Marc Trestman	Safety	Minnesota State–Moorhead

== Roster ==
1979 Minnesota Vikings roster
Quarterbacks (QB): 12 Steve Dils; 9 Tommy Kramer; 11 John Reaves; Running backs (RB): 23 Ted Brown; 32 Jimmy Edwards; 33 Brent McClanahan; 35 Robert Miller; 34 Rickey Young; Wide receivers (WR): 80 Terry LeCount; 87 Kevin Miller; 28 Ahmad Rashad; 82 Robert Steele; 85 Sammy White; Tight ends (TE): 38 Bob Tucker; 83 Stu Voigt	Offensive linemen (OL): 68 Charlie Goodrum G; 61 Wes Hamilton G; 51 Jim Hough G; 56 Dave Huffman C; 74 Frank Myers T; 78 Steve Riley T; 67 Dennis Swilley C; 73 Ron Yary T; Defensive linemen (DL): 75 Randy Holloway DE; 70 Jim Marshall DE; 77 Mark Mullaney DE; 71 Steve Niehaus DT; 76 Dave Roller DT; 69 Doug Sutherland DT; 72 James White DT	Linebackers (LB): 59 Matt Blair OLB; 58 Wally Hilgenberg OLB; 57 Derrel Luce OLB; 54 Fred McNeill OLB; 50 Jeff Siemon MLB; 55 Scott Studwell MLB; Defensive backs (DB): 47 Tim Baylor FS; 20 Bobby Bryant CB; 45 Tommy Hannon SS; 25 Kurt Knoff FS; 22 Paul Krause FS; 49 Keith Nord SS; 27 John Turner CB; Special teams (ST): 8 Greg Coleman P; 7 Rick Danmeier K	Reserve: 44 Chuck Foreman RB (IR); 65 Tony Norman DE (IR); 81 Joe Senser TE (IR); 79 Lyman Smith DT (IR); 43 Nate Wright CB (IR); Rookies in italics

== Preseason ==
Week	Date	Opponent	Result	Record	Venue	Attendance
1	August 2	at Seattle Seahawks	L 9–12	0–1	Kingdome	60,881
2	August 11	at San Diego Chargers	L 0–19	0–2	San Diego Stadium	49,037
3	August 18	Miami Dolphins	L 10–21	0–3	Metropolitan Stadium	45,790
4	August 23	Kansas City Chiefs	L 0–25	0–4	Metropolitan Stadium	39,578

== Regular season ==
=== Schedule ===
Week	Date	Opponent	Result	Record	Venue	Attendance
1	September 2	San Francisco 49ers	**W** 28–22	1–0	Metropolitan Stadium	46,539
2	September 9	at **Chicago Bears**	**L** 7–26	1–1	Soldier Field	53,231
3	September 16	Miami Dolphins	**L** 12–27	1–2	Metropolitan Stadium	46,187
4	September 23	**Green Bay Packers**	**W** 27–21 (OT)	2–2	Metropolitan Stadium	46,524
5	September 30	at **Detroit Lions**	**W** 13–10	3–2	Silverdome	75,295
6	October 7	Dallas Cowboys	**L** 20–36	3–3	Metropolitan Stadium	47,572
7	October 15	at New York Jets	**L** 7–14	3–4	Shea Stadium	54,479
8	October 21	**Chicago Bears**	**W** 30–27	4–4	Metropolitan Stadium	41,164
9	October 28	**Tampa Bay Buccaneers**	**L** 10–12	4–5	Metropolitan Stadium	46,906
10	November 4	at St. Louis Cardinals	**L** 7–37	4–6	Busch Memorial Stadium	47,213
11	November 11	at **Green Bay Packers**	**L** 7–19	4–7	Milwaukee County Stadium	52,706
12	November 18	**Detroit Lions**	**W** 14–7	5–7	Metropolitan Stadium	43,650
13	November 25	at **Tampa Bay Buccaneers**	**W** 23–22	6–7	Tampa Stadium	70,039
14	December 2	at Los Angeles Rams	**L** 21–27 (OT)	6–8	Los Angeles Memorial Coliseum	56,700
15	December 9	Buffalo Bills	**W** 10–3	7–8	Metropolitan Stadium	42,239
16	December 16	at New England Patriots	**L** 23–27	7–9	Schaefer Stadium	54,719

Note: Intra-division opponents are in bold text.

=== Standings ===
NFC Central
	W	L	T	PCT	DIV	CONF	PF	PA	STK
Tampa Bay Buccaneers^{(2)}	10	6	0	.625	6–2	8–6	273	237	W1
Chicago Bears^{(5)}	10	6	0	.625	5–3	8–4	306	249	W3
Minnesota Vikings	7	9	0	.438	5–3	6–6	259	337	L1
Green Bay Packers	5	11	0	.313	3–5	4–8	246	316	W1
Detroit Lions	2	14	0	.125	1–7	2–10	219	365	L3

== Awards and records ==
- On September 2, WR Ahmad Rashad caught four touchdown passes, which remains a Vikings single-game record.
- On November 25, the team blocked four kicks – two extra point attempts, a field goal attempt and a punt by Tom Blanchard – against the Tampa Bay Buccaneers. This remains a franchise record.
- On December 16, RB Rickey Young caught 15 passes, a single-game franchise record.

== Statistics ==
=== Team leaders ===
Category	Player(s)	Value
Passing yards	Tommy Kramer	3,397
Passing touchdowns	Tommy Kramer	23
Rushing yards	Rickey Young	708
Rushing touchdowns	Rickey Young	3
Receiving yards	Ahmad Rashad	1,156
Receiving touchdowns	Ahmad Rashad	9
Points	Rick Danmeier	67
Kickoff return yards	Jimmy Edwards	1,103
Punt return yards	Jimmy Edwards	186
Interceptions	Tommy Hannon; Nate Wright	4

=== League rankings ===
Category	Total yards	Yards per game	NFL rank (out of 28)
Passing offense	3,139	196.2	12th
Rushing offense	1,764	110.3	23rd
Total offense	4,903	306.4	19th
Passing defense	2,697	168.6	11th
Rushing defense	2,526	157.9	26th
Total defense	5,223	326.4	18th
