= Dexter Bussey =

American football player (born 1952)

No. 24
- Position: Running back

Personal information
- Born: March 11, 1952 (age 74); Dallas, Texas, U.S.
- Listed height: 6 ft 1 in (1.85 m)
- Listed weight: 195 lb (88 kg)

Career information
- High school: John F. Kennedy (TX)
- College: Texas–Arlington
- NFL draft: 1974: 3rd round, 65th overall pick

Career history
- Detroit Lions (1974–1984)

Career NFL statistics
- Rushing attempts: 1,203
- Rushing yards: 5,105
- Rushing TDs: 18
- Stats at Pro Football Reference

Dexter Manley Bussey (born March 11, 1952) is an American former professional football player who was a running back for 11 years with the Detroit Lions of the National Football League (NFL) from 1974 to 1984. He became the Lions' all-time career rushing leader in 1981.

Bussey was born in Dallas, Texas, in 1952. He began his college career at the University of Oklahoma, but he transferred to the University of Texas–Arlington. He played for the Texas–Arlington Mavericks football team from 1971 to 1973, and totaled over 1,000 yards from scrimmage in both 1972 and 1973.

Bussey was selected by the Detroit Lions in the third round, 65th overall pick, of the 1974 NFL draft. He played for the Lions from 1974 to 1984. While with the Lions, he gained more than 1,000 yards from scrimmage in 1976, 1978, and 1980. In his 10-year career in the NFL, Bussey totaled 5,105 rushing yards and 6,721 yards from scrimmage. He was the Lions' starting halfback from 1975 to 1979 and the team's leading rusher in 1975, 1976, 1978, and 1979. He moved to fullback in 1980 after the Lions drafted Billy Sims. Bussey broke Altie Taylor's Lions' career rushing record in 1981, but his record was surpassed by Sims in 1984, and he became a backup after the Lions drafted James Jones in 1983. Bussey announced his retirement from the NFL in April 1985 at age 33.

After retiring as a player, Bussey worked for at least 20 years as a uniform inspector for the NFL. He also operated a medical staffing agency.

== NFL career statistics ==
Legend
**Bold**	Career high

=== Regular season ===
Year	Team	Games		Rushing					Receiving				
Year	Team	GP	GS	Att	Yds	Avg	Lng	TD	Rec	Yds	Avg	Lng	TD
1974	DET	11	0	9	22	2.4	9	0	4	24	6.0	8	0
1975	DET	13	13	157	696	4.4	32	2	14	175	**12.5**	**65**	**2**
1976	DET	14	14	196	858	4.4	**46**	3	28	218	7.8	27	0
1977	DET	8	4	85	338	4.0	31	4	11	116	10.5	39	1
1978	DET	**16**	**16**	**225**	**924**	4.1	36	**5**	31	275	8.9	18	1
1979	DET	**16**	10	144	625	4.3	38	1	15	102	6.8	22	0
1980	DET	**16**	**16**	145	720	**5.0**	40	3	**39**	**364**	9.3	30	0
1981	DET	**16**	15	105	446	4.2	23	0	18	92	5.1	16	0
1982	DET	9	6	48	136	2.8	10	0	16	138	8.6	21	0
1983	DET	15	3	57	249	4.4	26	0	8	49	6.1	14	1
1984	DET	**16**	3	32	91	2.8	18	0	9	63	7.0	19	0
		150	100	1,203	5,105	4.2	46	18	193	1,616	8.4	65	5

=== Playoffs ===
Year	Team	Games		Rushing					Receiving				
Year	Team	GP	GS	Att	Yds	Avg	Lng	TD	Rec	Yds	Avg	Lng	TD
1982	DET	**1**	**1**	**5**	**19**	**3.8**	**9**	0	**1**	-2	-2.0	-2	0
1983	DET	**1**	0	0	0	0.0	0	0	0	0	0.0	0	0
		2	1	5	19	3.8	9	0	1	-2	-2.0	-2	0
