= NFC North =

Division of the National Football League

- Formerly: NFC Central (1970–2001); Western Conference Central Division (1967–1969)
- Conference: National Football Conference (NFC)
- League: National Football League (NFL)
- Sport: American football
- Founded: 1967
- No. of teams: 4
- Country: United States
- Most recent champion: Chicago Bears (2025)
- Most titles: Minnesota Vikings (21)
- 2026 NFL season

The NFC North (formerly known as the Western Conference Central Division and the NFC Central) is one of the four divisions of the National Football Conference (NFC) in the National Football League (NFL). Nicknamed the "Black and Blue Division" for the intense and longstanding rivalry games between the teams, it currently has four members: the Chicago Bears, Detroit Lions, Green Bay Packers, and Minnesota Vikings. The Tampa Bay Buccaneers were members from 1977 to 2001 before a league-wide reorganization moved the team to the NFC South. The division was originally formed in 1967 as part of the Western Conference and was called the Central Division. With the completion of the AFL–NFL merger in 1970, the Western Conference was renamed to the National Football Conference (NFC), with the Central Division retaining its name and styled as the NFC Central. In 2002, the division was renamed to the NFC North. Excluding a dominant period by the Bears in the 1980s, the division has consistently been won by the Vikings and Packers, who have 21 and 17 division titles, respectively. The most recent winner of the division was the Bears in the 2025 NFL season.

== History ==
The NFC North traces its history back to the Western Division of the NFL, which was formed in 1933 alongside the Eastern Division. (Note: In 1933, the NFL split into two divisions known as the Eastern Division and Western Division; the Western Division included the Green Bay Packers, Chicago Bears, and Portsmouth Spartans (who were renamed to the Detroit Lions in 1934). In 1950, the divisions were renamed to the American Conference and National Conference, with the National Conference still including the Packers, Bears, and Lions. In 1953, the conferences were again renamed, this time to the Eastern Conference and Western Conference, with the Western Conference still including the Packers, Bears, and Lions. In 1961, the Minnesota Vikings entered the NFL and were placed in the Western Conference. In 1967, the Western Conference was split into two divisions: the newly formed Central Division included the Packers, Bears, Lions, and Vikings. In 1970, the Western Conference was renamed to the National Football Conference. Finally, in 2002, the Central Division was renamed to the NFC North with the Packers, Bears, Lions, and Vikings.) From 1933 to 1966, the winners of these divisions played each other in the NFL Championship Game to determine that season's champion. In 1967, the NFL split the Western Division (which had been renamed to the Western Conference) into two divisions, with the winner of the newly-formed Central Division playing the winner of the Coastal Division for the right to play in the championship game. With the completion of the AFL–NFL merger in 1970, the Western Conference was renamed to the National Football Conference (NFC) while the Central Division retained its name. This created a multi-round playoff system, with teams playing in a "divisional round" and a "conference championship round" to determine who played in the championship game, which was retroactively called the Super Bowl. In 2002, the division was renamed to the NFC North.

The location of the teams in the NFC North.

When the Central Division was formed in 1967, it included the Chicago Bears, Detroit Lions, Green Bay Packers, and Minnesota Vikings. The Bears and Packers were members of the NFL from its early years (1920 and 1921, respectively), while the Lions entered the league in 1930 and the Vikings in 1960. All four teams were members of the same division or conference from their formation until 1966. As part of the AFL–NFL merger, the league reorganized its conference and division make-up, and agreed to expand from 24 teams to 28 over the next few years. The Baltimore Colts, Cleveland Browns, and Pittsburgh Steelers agreed to be part of the American Football Conference (AFC) with the 10 AFL teams, while the remaining 13 teams formed the NFC. The AFC teams quickly agreed to being split into three divisions, however NFC teams could not come to an agreement. The final make-up of the divisions in the NFC were decided by random drawing by NFL Commissioner Pete Rozelle's secretary from five options, with the Packers, Bears, Lions, and Vikings staying in the NFC Central. In 1976, the Seattle Seahawks and Tampa Bay Buccaneers entered the NFL as expansion teams. The Buccaneers were added to the NFC Central, where they would play until 2001. In 2002, as part of a larger league reorganization that included another expansion team (the Houston Texans), the Buccaneers were moved to the newly formed NFC South to ensure the league's eight divisions each had four teams. This reorganization also allowed the NFL to standardize the development of the schedule. Out of a total of 16 games, six would be division rivalry games, four would be against another division in the same conference, four would be against another division in the other conference, and two would be against intraconference opponents based on the prior year's standings (e.g. first place teams would be first place teams, second place would be second place, and so on). This ensured that each team would play each other at least every four years. The NFL added a 17th game in 2021, which would be an interconference opponent again based on the prior year's standings.

Although the Packers were the first winners of the NFC North in 1967 and the eventual Super Bowl champions that season, the early years of the division were dominated by the Vikings. From 1968 to 1980, the Vikings were division winners 11 out of 14 seasons, including six straight starting in 1973, the record for consecutive division championships in the NFC North. The Vikings made the Super Bowl as NFC champions four times in this period, although they lost each one. The 1980s were dominated by the Bears, who led the division five straight seasons from 1984 to 1988, including a Super Bowl victory in 1985. The 1980s included the 1982 NFL season, which was shortened by a strike. The Packers had the best record in the division that year, however because the season was reduced to nine games, division standings were suspended and standings were based on conference alone, with eight teams from each conference making the postseason. Another strike in 1987 led to the use of replacement players and one game being cancelled, but otherwise did not impact division standings.

During the 1990s and early 2000s, the division was fairly competitive: from 1989 to 2010, the Packers and Vikings each won the division seven times, while the Bears won it five times, the Lions twice, and the Buccaneers once. The NFC North also sent at least one team to the playoffs as a Wild Card selection 13 seasons during this time period. (Note: The NFC North had at least one team make the playoffs as a Wild Card in 1991, 1993 to 2001, 2004, 2009, and 2010; see the season-by-season results table.) The Packers saw the most postseason success in the 1990s and early 2000s, winning two Super Bowls (in 1996 and 2010) and losing another, while the Bears also made the Super Bowl in 2006 but lost. The year after their Super Bowl victory in 2010, the Packers began a period of sustained success in the division, winning the NFC North eight times in eleven seasons. More recently, the division has returned to competitiveness, with each team winning the division at least once in a five-year period from 2021 to 2025. The most recent division champion was the Bears in the 2025 NFL season, while the Vikings have the most division titles at 21.

== Culture ==
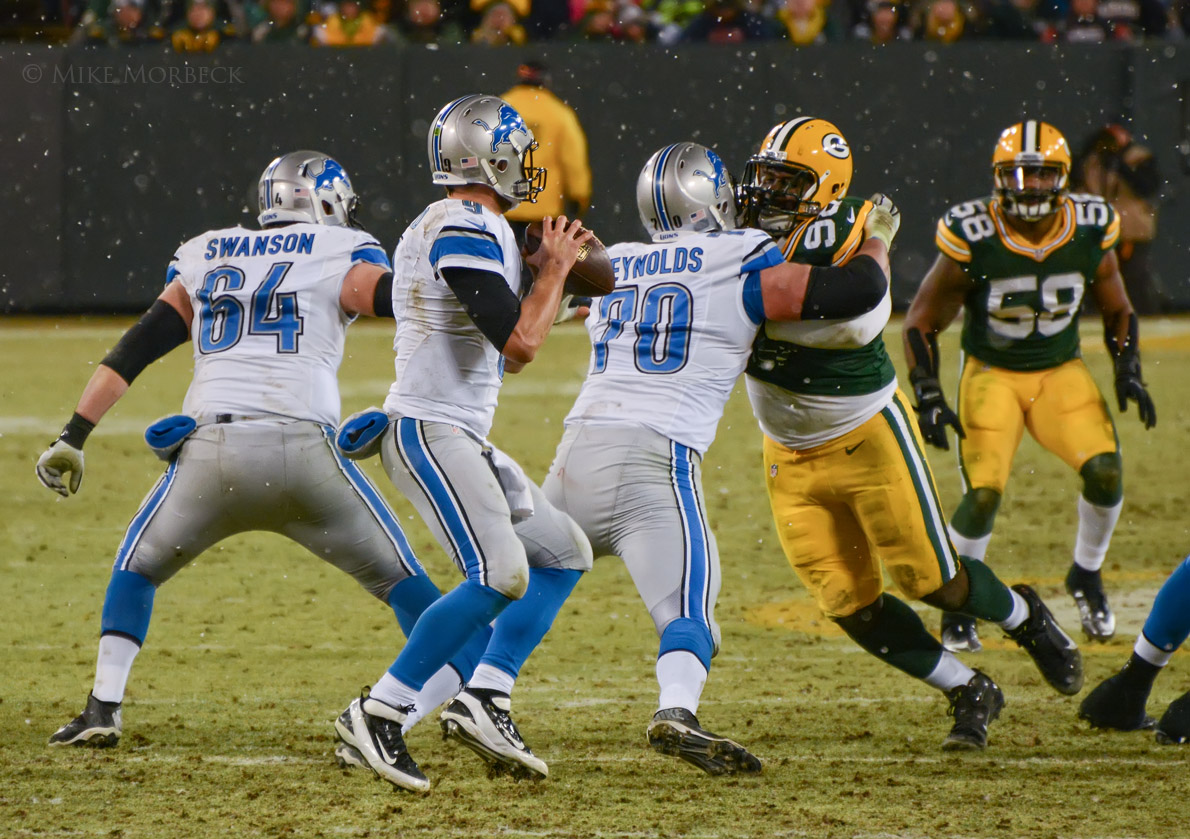
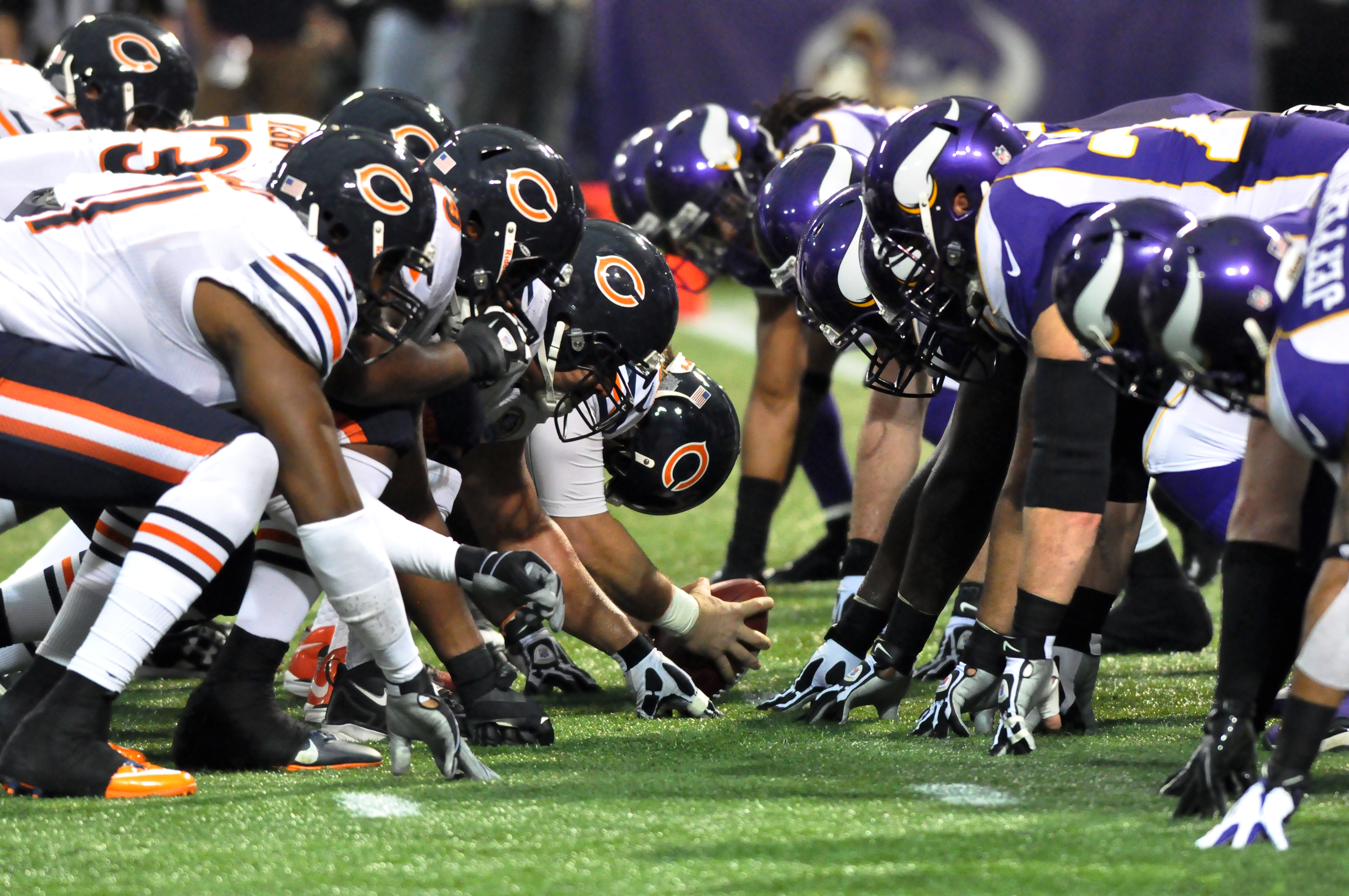
The Lions versus Packers (top) and Bears versus Vikings (bottom) highlight two of the many defining rivalries in the NFC North.

Nicknamed the "Black and Blue Division", the NFC North is known for physical style of play, historic rivalries, and cold weather games. Although the division included the Buccaneers (who play in Florida) for over 30 years, the four current members of the division are all located in northern cities that experience cold and snowy winters. The Bears and Packers still play in outdoor stadiums (Soldier Field and Lambeau Field), while the Lions and the Vikings both play indoors at Ford Field and U.S. Bank Stadium, respectively. By 1932, three of the four current NFC North teams had entered the NFL: the Bears, Packers, and Lions. Because the teams have played against each other for so long, strong rivalries have developed across the division. This includes the Bears–Packers rivalry, which is one of the oldest and most storied rivalries in NFL history, having started in 1921 and featuring over 200 games. The Bears and Lions have played each other at least once a season since 1930, while the Lions and Packers have met at least twice a season every year since 1932. The 1982 strike prevented the Bears and Packers from playing each other that season, while a strike in 1987 cancelled one game between the Lions and Bears. (Note: When the 1987 game between the Lions and Bears was cancelled, the Detroit Free Press stated that the game "was called off, to be played after the strike or cancelled completely". The game, as was all Week 3 match-ups, was ultimately cancelled and not played.)

== Notable games ==
Despite playing each other twice every season, NFC North members have rarely played each other in the playoffs, with most match-ups having occurred in the Wild Card round. (Note: NFC North teams have faced each other in the postseason 12 times; of these 10 games, 7 occurred in the Wild Card round, 3 in the divisional round, and 2 in the conference championship round.) The only conference championship game to include two current members of the NFC North was in 2010 when the Packers beat the Bears 21–14 to advance to Super Bowl XLV (the Packers and Buccaneers played in the 2020 NFC Championship Game, although this occurred almost two decades after the Buccaneers had been moved to the NFC South). Prior to the creation of conferences, the Bears and Packers met in the 1941 NFL playoffs, with the Bears 33–14 victory advancing them to the 1941 NFL Championship Game. The Lions have never faced the Bears or Vikings in the playoffs, while the Bears and Vikings have only met once. The Packers have played the Bears three times in the playoffs; they have also faced the Vikings, Lions, and Buccaneers twice each (as noted, the aforementioned 2020 NFC Championship Game did not occur while the Buccaneers were in the NFC North). The Buccaneers never played the Bears or Vikings in the playoffs, but they did face the Lions twice: once as NFC Central members and once after leaving the division.

Although not formally a playoff game, on seven occasions the last game of the season has included a match-up where the winner would be crowned NFC North champion. The first instance of this winner-take-all game occurred in 1981, with the Buccaneers beating the Lions 20–17. In 1993, the Lions and Packers met during the last game of the season, with the Lions' victory giving them the division championship, although the Packers still made the playoffs as a Wild Card team (as did the Vikings). Over a four season period from 2013 to 2016, the NFC North was decided each year by a winner-take-all game at the end of the season. All four games included the Packers, who beat the Bears in 2013, and the Lions in 2014 and 2016; the Vikings beat the Packers in 2015. Excluding 2013, the loser of those winner-take-all games still made the postseason as a Wild Card team. Most recently, the Lions beat the Vikings the last game of the year in 2024 to not only secure the division title, but also the first seed in the playoffs and home field advantage throughout the playoffs.

== Results ==
=== Team success ===
Team success
| Team | Years in division | Playoff berths | Division championships | NFC Championship Game appearances | Super Bowl appearances | Super Bowl wins | Refs |
|---|---|---|---|---|---|---|---|
| Chicago Bears | 1967–present | 17 | 12 | 5 | 2 | 1 | |
| Detroit Lions | 1967–present | 14 | 5 | 2 | 0 | 0 | |
| Green Bay Packers | 1967–present | 28 | 17 | 10 | 5 | 4 | |
| Minnesota Vikings | 1967–present | 32 | 21 | 10 | 4 | 0 | |
| Tampa Bay Buccaneers | 1977–2001 | 7 | 3 | 2 | 0 | 0 | |

=== Season-by-season ===
Table legend
| Super Bowl champions ‡ | Conference champions ^{*} | Division champions ^{^} | Wild card berth ^{#} |

NFC North yearly standings and team records
| Season | Team (record) | | | | | Notes | Refs |
| Season | 1st | 2nd | 3rd | 4th | 5th | Notes | Refs |
Western Conference Central Division
| 1967 | Green Bay (9–4–1) ‡ | Chicago (7–6–1) | Detroit (5–7–2) | Minnesota (3–8–3) | — | The NFL split the Western Conference into two divisions, with the winner of the Central Division playing the winner of the Coastal Division for the right to play in the NFL Championship. | |
| 1968 | Minnesota (8–6) ^{^} | Chicago (7–7) | Green Bay (6–7–1) | Detroit (4–8–2) | — | | |
| 1969 | Minnesota (12–2)^{*} | Detroit (9–4–1) | Green Bay (8–6) | Chicago (1–13) | — | | |
NFC Central Division
| 1970 | Minnesota (12–2) ^{^} | Detroit (10–4) ^{#} | Green Bay (6–8) | Chicago (6–8) | — | With the completion of the AFL–NFL merger, the Bears, Lions, Packers, and Vikings were placed into the Central Division of the National Football Conference (NFC). | |
| 1971 | Minnesota (11–3) ^{^} | Detroit (7–6–1) | Chicago (6–8) | Green Bay (4–8–2) | — | | |
| 1972 | Green Bay (10–4) ^{^} | Detroit (8–5–1) | Minnesota (7–7) | Chicago (4–9–1) | — | | |
| 1973 | Minnesota (12–2) ^{*} | Detroit (6–7–1) | Green Bay (5–7–2) | Chicago (3–11) | — | | |
| 1974 | Minnesota (10–4) ^{*} | Detroit (7–7) | Green Bay (6–8) | Chicago (4–10) | — | | |
| 1975 | Minnesota (12–2) ^{^} | Detroit (7–7) | Chicago (4–10) | Green Bay (4–10) | — | | |
| 1976 | Minnesota (11–2–1) ^{*} | Chicago (7–7) | Detroit (6–8) | Green Bay (5–9) | — | | |
| 1977 | Minnesota (9–5) ^{^} | Chicago (9–5) ^{#} | Detroit (6–8) | Green Bay (4–10) | Tampa Bay (2–12) | The Tampa Bay Buccaneers and Seattle Seahawks entered the NFL as expansion teams. The Buccaneers were placed in the NFC Central. | |
| 1978 | Minnesota (8–7–1) ^{^} | Green Bay (8–7–1) | Detroit (7–9) | Chicago (7–9) | Tampa Bay (5–11) | | |
| 1979 | Tampa Bay (10–6) ^{^} | Chicago (10–6) ^{#} | Minnesota (7–9) | Green Bay (5–11) | Detroit (2–14) | | |
| 1980 | Minnesota (9–7) ^{^} | Detroit (9–7) | Chicago (7–9) | Tampa Bay (5–10–1) | Green Bay (5–10–1) | | |
| 1981 | Tampa Bay (9–7) ^{^} | Detroit (8–8) | Green Bay (8–8) | Minnesota (7–9) | Chicago (6–10) | | |
| 1982 | Green Bay (5–3–1) ^{#} | Minnesota (5–4) ^{#} | Tampa Bay (5–4) ^{#} | Detroit (4–5) ^{#} | Chicago (3–6) | The NFL season was shortened to nine games by a strike, with divisions temporarily suspended and standings based on conference alone. | |
| 1983 | Detroit (9–7) ^{^} | Green Bay (8–8) | Chicago (8–8) | Minnesota (8–8) | Tampa Bay (2–14) | | |
| 1984 | Chicago (10–6) ^{^} | Green Bay (8–8) | Tampa Bay (6–10) | Detroit (4–11–1) | Minnesota (3–13) | | |
| 1985 | Chicago (15–1) ‡ | Green Bay (8–8) | Minnesota (7–9) | Detroit (7–9) | Tampa Bay (2–14) | | |
| 1986 | Chicago (14–2) ^{^} | Minnesota (9–7) | Detroit (5–11) | Green Bay (4–12) | Tampa Bay (2–14) | | |
| 1987 | Chicago (11–4) ^{^} | Minnesota (8–7) ^{#} | Green Bay (5–9–1) | Tampa Bay (4–11) | Detroit (4–11) | The strike of 1987 reduced the regular season from 16 to 15 games. | |
| 1988 | Chicago (12–4) ^{^} | Minnesota (11–5) ^{#} | Tampa Bay (5–11) | Detroit (4–12) | Green Bay (4–12) | | |
| 1989 | Minnesota (10–6) ^{^} | Green Bay (10–6) | Detroit (7–9) | Chicago (6–10) | Tampa Bay (5–11) | | |
| 1990 | Chicago (11–5) ^{^} | Tampa Bay (6–10) | Detroit (6–10) | Green Bay (6–10) | Minnesota (6–10) | | |
| 1991 | Detroit (12–4) ^{^} | Chicago (11–5) ^{#} | Minnesota (8–8) | Green Bay (4–12) | Tampa Bay (3–13) | | |
| 1992 | Minnesota (11–5) ^{^} | Green Bay (9–7) | Tampa Bay (5–11) | Chicago (5–11) | Detroit (5–11) | | |
| 1993 | Detroit (10–6) ^{^} | Minnesota (9–7) ^{#} | Green Bay (9–7) ^{#} | Chicago (7–9) | Tampa Bay (5–11) | | |
| 1994 | Minnesota (10–6) ^{^} | Green Bay (9–7) ^{#} | Detroit (9–7) ^{#} | Chicago (9–7) ^{#} | Tampa Bay (6–10) | | |
| 1995 | Green Bay (11–5) ^{^} | Detroit (10–6) ^{#} | Chicago (9–7) | Minnesota (8–8) | Tampa Bay (7–9) | | |
| 1996 | Green Bay (13–3) ‡ | Minnesota (9–7) ^{#} | Chicago (7–9) | Tampa Bay (6–10) | Detroit (5–11) | | |
| 1997 | Green Bay (13–3) ^{*} | Tampa Bay (10–6) ^{#} | Detroit (9–7) ^{#} | Minnesota (9–7) ^{#} | Chicago (4–12) | | |
| 1998 | Minnesota (15–1) ^{^} | Green Bay (11–5) ^{#} | Tampa Bay (8–8) | Detroit (5–11) | Chicago (4–12) | | |
| 1999 | Tampa Bay (11–5) ^{^} | Minnesota (10–6) ^{#} | Detroit (8–8) ^{#} | Green Bay (8–8) | Chicago (6–10) | | |
| 2000 | Minnesota (11–5) ^{^} | Tampa Bay (10–6) ^{#} | Green Bay (9–7) | Detroit (9–7) | Chicago (5–11) | | |
| 2001 | Chicago (13–3) ^{^} | Green Bay (12–4) ^{#} | Tampa Bay (9–7) ^{#} | Minnesota (5–11) | Detroit (2–14) | | |
NFC North Division
| 2002 | Green Bay (12–4) ^{^} | Minnesota (6–10) | Chicago (4–12) | Detroit (3–13) | — | The NFL realigned to create four divisions in both conferences with four teams in each division, with the NFC Central being renamed the NFC North. The Buccaneers moved to the NFC South. | |
| 2003 | Green Bay (10–6) ^{^} | Minnesota (9–7) | Chicago (7–9) | Detroit (5–11) | — | | |
| 2004 | Green Bay (10–6) ^{^} | Minnesota (8–8) ^{#} | Detroit (6–10) | Chicago (5–11) | — | | |
| 2005 | Chicago (11–5) ^{^} | Minnesota (9–7) | Detroit (5–11) | Green Bay (4–12) | — | | |
| 2006 | Chicago (13–3) ^{*} | Green Bay (8–8) | Minnesota (6–10) | Detroit (3–13) | — | | |
| 2007 | Green Bay (13–3) ^{^} | Minnesota (8–8) | Detroit (7–9) | Chicago (7–9) | — | | |
| 2008 | Minnesota (10–6) ^{^} | Chicago (9–7) | Green Bay (6–10) | Detroit (0–16) | — | | |
| 2009 | Minnesota (12–4) ^{^} | Green Bay (11–5) ^{#} | Chicago (7–9) | Detroit (2–14) | — | | |
| 2010 | Chicago (11–5) | Green Bay (10–6) ‡ | Detroit (6–10) | Minnesota (6–10) | — | | |
| 2011 | Green Bay (15–1) ^{^} | Detroit (10–6) ^{#} | Chicago (8–8) | Minnesota (3–13) | — | | |
| 2012 | Green Bay (11–5) ^{^} | Minnesota (10–6) ^{#} | Chicago (10–6) | Detroit (4–12) | — | | |
| 2013 | Green Bay (8–7–1) ^{^} | Chicago (8–8) | Detroit (7–9) | Minnesota (5–10–1) | — | | |
| 2014 | Green Bay (12–4) ^{^} | Detroit (11–5) ^{#} | Minnesota (7–9) | Chicago (5–11) | — | | |
| 2015 | Minnesota (11–5) ^{^} | Green Bay (10–6) ^{#} | Detroit (7–9) | Chicago (6–10) | — | | |
| 2016 | Green Bay (10–6) ^{^} | Detroit (9–7) ^{#} | Minnesota (8–8) | Chicago (3–13) | — | | |
| 2017 | Minnesota (13–3) ^{^} | Detroit (9–7) | Green Bay (7–9) | Chicago (5–11) | — | | |
| 2018 | Chicago (12–4) ^{^} | Minnesota (8–7–1) | Green Bay (6–9–1) | Detroit (6–10) | — | | |
| 2019 | Green Bay (13–3) ^{^} | Minnesota (10–6) ^{#} | Chicago (8–8) | Detroit (3–12–1) | — | | |
| 2020 | Green Bay (13–3) ^{^} | Chicago (8–8) ^{#} | Minnesota (7–9) | Detroit (5–11) | — | | |
| 2021 | Green Bay (13–4) ^{^} | Minnesota (8–9) | Chicago (6–11) | Detroit (3–13–1) | — | The NFL expanded its season from 16 to 17 games a year. | |
| 2022 | Minnesota (13–4) ^{^} | Detroit (9–8) | Green Bay (8–9) | Chicago (3–14) | — | | |
| 2023 | Detroit (12–5) ^{^} | Green Bay (9–8) ^{#} | Minnesota (7–10) | Chicago (7–10) | — | | |
| 2024 | Detroit (15–2) ^{^} | Minnesota (14–3) ^{#} | Green Bay (11–6) ^{#} | Chicago (5–12) | — | | |
| 2025 | Chicago (11–6) ^{^} | Green Bay (9–7–1) ^{#} | Minnesota (9–8) | Detroit (9–8) | — | | |
| 2026 | Detroit (7–2) | Minnesota (7–2) | Chicago (7–2) | Green Bay (6–4) | — | | |

== See also ==
- NFL rivalries § NFC North
- Buccaneers–Packers rivalry
