= Monte Clark =

American football player and coach (1937–2009)

- Clark in 1961

No. 63, 73
- Positions: Offensive tackle, defensive tackle, defensive end

Personal information
- Born: January 24, 1937; Fillmore, California, U.S.
- Died: September 16, 2009 (aged 72); Detroit, Michigan, U.S.
- Listed height: 6 ft 6 in (1.98 m)
- Listed weight: 265 lb (120 kg)

Career information
- High school: Kingsburg
- College: USC
- NFL draft: 1958: 4th round, 41st overall pick

Career history

Playing
- San Francisco 49ers (1959–1961); Dallas Cowboys (1962); Cleveland Browns (1963–1969)

Coaching
- Miami Dolphins (1970–1975); Offensive line coach (1970–1973); Offensive coordinator (1974); Offensive coordinator & offensive line coach (1975); San Francisco 49ers (1976) Head coach; Detroit Lions (1978–1984) Head coach; Stanford (1993–1994) Offensive line coach; Miami Dolphins (1995) Offensive line coach; California (1998) Assistant coach

Operations
- Miami Dolphins (1990–1994) Director of player personnel; Detroit Lions (1999–2008) Advisor

Awards and highlights
- 2× Super Bowl champion (VII, VIII); NFL champion (1964)

Career NFL statistics
- Games played: 139
- Games started: 102
- Stats at Pro Football Reference

Head coaching record
- Regular season: 51–67 (.432)
- Postseason: 0–2 (.000)
- Career: 51–69 (.425)
- Coaching profile at Pro Football Reference

Monte Dale Clark (January 24, 1937 – September 16, 2009) was an American professional football player who served as head coach for the San Francisco 49ers and the Detroit Lions. He played college football at USC.

== Early life ==
Clark attended Kingsburg High School, where he practiced football, basketball, baseball and track. As a senior, he contributed to the team winning a football championship, that included a 55-0 championship game win against Avenal High School. He was named the MVP of the first Fresno City-County All-Star football game.

He accepted a football scholarship from USC. He was a two-year starter and in 1958, he was named a co-captain of the squad, playing on both sides of the line with future Pro Football Hall of Famer Ron Mix.

In 1968, he was inducted into the Fresno Athletic Hall of Fame.

== Professional career ==
=== San Francisco 49ers ===
Clark was selected by the San Francisco 49ers in the fourth round (41st overall) of the 1959 NFL draft. After three years of playing defense, primarily at defensive tackle, he was traded to the Dallas Cowboys in exchange for a draft choice on September 9, 1962.

=== Dallas Cowboys ===
The Dallas Cowboys converted him into an offensive tackle, playing 14 games (10 starts) on the right side during the 1962 season. On April 29, 1963, he was traded to the Cleveland Browns in exchange for Pro Bowl offensive guard Jim Ray Smith.

=== Cleveland Browns ===
The Cleveland Browns acquired Clark primarily because of his pass protection skills and to replace the recently retired Mike McCormack at right tackle. However, in the first exhibition game with his new team on August 10, Clark suffered a knee injury which never fully recovered during the course of the campaign, while playing in 8 games.

Even though he never received Pro Bowl recognition, Clark would become a staple at right tackle for six seasons and become a key contributor in one of the best offensive lines in the league along with Gene Hickerson, Dick Schafrath, John Wooten and John Morrow, while blocking for running back Jim Brown.

In the 1964 NFL Championship Game against the Baltimore Colts, Clark put his talents on display as he neutralized Colts' defensive end and future Pro Football Hall of Famer Gino Marchetti. The result was a stunning 27–0 Browns victory.

Another solid season by Clark the following year saw the Browns once again reach the NFL title game. His 1966 season was disrupted when he suffered a torn biceps late in the year, an injury that forced off-season surgery.

== Coaching career ==
=== Miami Dolphins ===
After Clark announced his retirement, he was hired as the Miami Dolphins' offensive line coach on April 8, 1970, working under their new head coach, Don Shula. Shula hired Clark over the phone without an interview following glowing endorsements from Blanton Collier (Browns head coach) and 49ers head coach Dick Nolan. Clark's timing proved excellent when Shula helped transform the moribund franchise into a dynasty. During the final two years of his tenure, Clark served as the team's offensive coordinator, which included the undefeated 1972 team.

In Miami, Clark built what many consider one of the best offensive lines in NFL history, as Larry Little and Jim Langer are both in the Hall of Fame, while Bob Kuechenberg continues to be nominated every year. This line not only helped set a new all-time rushing record, but also became the first-team ever to have two backs rush for over 1,000 yards in a single season, including Hall of Fame running back Larry Csonka. Clark was asked about Csonka's bruising running style, and responded with this great quote. "When Csonka goes on safari, the lions roll up their windows."

=== San Francisco 49ers ===
During those six years of success in Miami, Clark was under consideration by teams to become their head coach, including his old team, the Browns in 1975. However, his first head coaching opportunity would come one year later, when his original team, the San Francisco 49ers, hired him on January 13, 1976, making him the league's youngest head coach at the time.

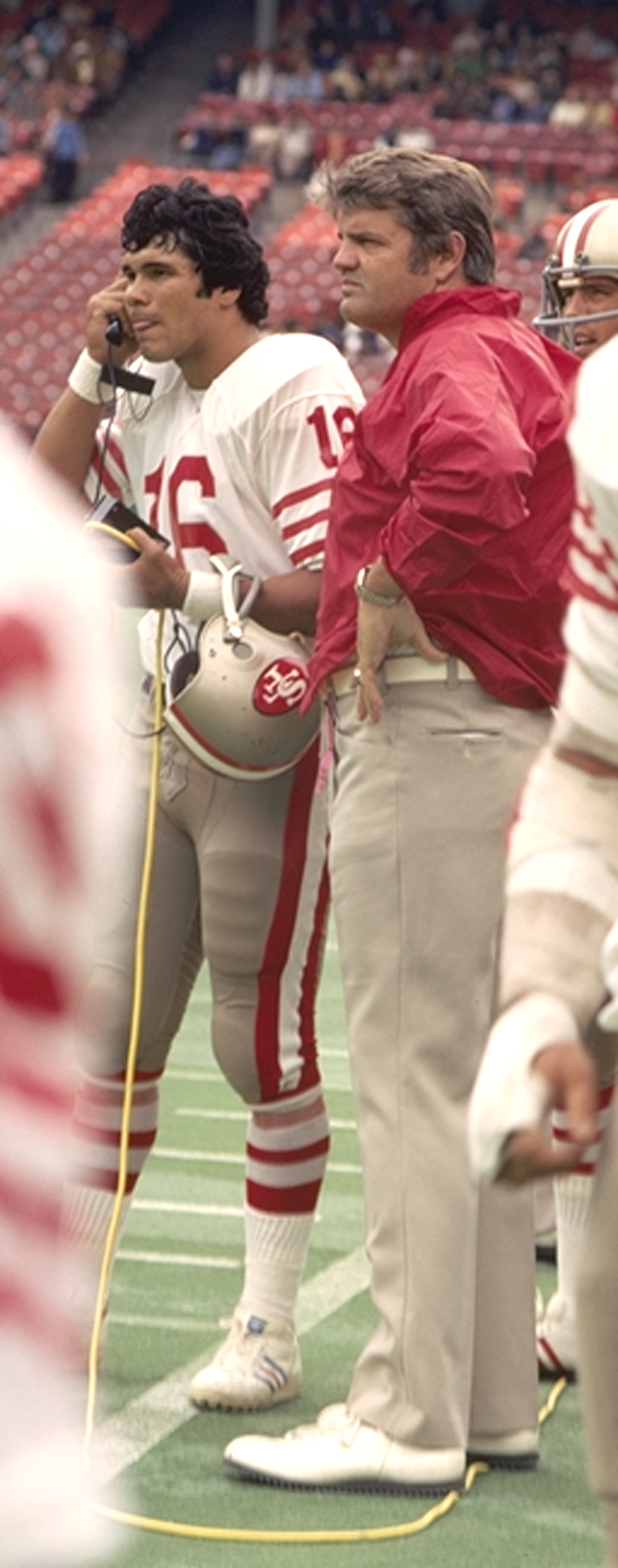
Jim Plunkett playing for the San Francisco 49ers with head coach Monte Clark at Candlestick Park, San Francisco.

As essentially the team's general manager, one of Clark's early moves was to acquire quarterback Jim Plunkett from the New England Patriots. He also put together a tough defensive line that had 30 sacks in the first six games of the 1976 NFL season. After winning six of the first seven games, the 49ers dropped a 23–20 overtime decision to the St. Louis Cardinals, a defeat that began a tailspin in which the team ended the year with an 8–6 record.

In March 1977, the 49ers' franchise was sold to Edward J. DeBartolo Jr. DeBartolo's ownership came with baggage: General Manager Joe Thomas. Clark was familiar with Thomas from his days with the Dolphins and knew of the chaos and disruption he would bring to the 49ers. DeBartolo offered Clark more money and an extended contract to give up his player personnel duties to Thomas. Standing by his principles and with integrity Clark refused to give up his personnel duties, and was fired on April 6. Clark's actions would ring true as Thomas would go on to oversee the worst stretch of football in the team's history burning through four coaches in three years.

=== Detroit Lions ===
After sitting out the 1977 NFL season, Clark found a new challenge when he was hired as head coach of the Detroit Lions on January 11, 1978. Clark again had complete personnel control of a team, and finished with a 7–9 record in his first season. However, in 1979, a season-ending injury to starting quarterback Gary Danielson during the preseason left the Lions without an experienced signal caller and resulted in a disastrous 2–14 campaign. The one bright spot in that season was that Detroit selected first in the 1980 NFL draft, with the team picking Heisman Trophy winner Billy Sims. The resurgent Lions improved by seven games that year, winning five of their first six games and capturing a share of the NFC Central Division title, but a late-season slide caused them to lose a tie-breaker with the Vikings and keep them out of the playoffs.

An 8–8 season in 1981 was followed by a 4–5 record in the strike-shortened 1982 NFL season. However, because of the expanded playoff system resulting from the strike, the Lions reached the postseason. Their appearance was brief as they dropped a 31-7 opening round decision to the Washington Redskins, who went on to win Super Bowl XVII.

A slow start that saw the Lions win just one of their first five games in 1983 quickly changed when the Lions bounced back to capture the division title with a 9–7 record. As a huge underdog against the 49ers, the Lions nearly pulled off a major upset before losing 24–23. Detroit had led 23–17 with five minutes remaining, but San Francisco quickly took back the lead. In the closing seconds, Lions' kicker Eddie Murray, who had made a 54-yard field goal in the first half, narrowly missed a 43-yard attempt with 11 seconds to go, putting an end to Detroit's season. As Murray lined up to attempt the potential game-winning field goal, on the sidelines Clark put his hands together in an apparent prayer (the "prayer" was replayed often and was recently cited by ESPN as one of the Lions' most memorable moments). Whenever asked about that unanswered prayer, Monte would respond, "It was answered, but the answer was No".

Clark's final year saw the Lions win just once in their first six games. After a career-ending knee injury to Sims in week eight, the Lions crashed to just one win the rest of the way for a 4–11–1 record. On December 19, 1984, the inevitable resulted when Clark was dismissed, a move that kept him out of football for the next five years until his return as director of player personnel for the Dolphins in February 1990. Five years later, Clark was again hired as offensive line coach of the Dolphins, but the tenure lasted only one year after Shula was replaced by Jimmy Johnson. Out of football for two years, Clark resurfaced as an assistant at the University of California, Berkeley in 1998, but resigned at the conclusion of that season. He returned to the Lions organization in 1999 as an advisor, remaining there until 2008.

== Head coaching record ==
Team	Year	Regular season					Postseason			
Team	Year	Won	Lost	Ties	Win %	Finish	Won	Lost	Win %	Result
SF	1976	8	6	0	.571	2nd in NFC West	-	-	-	-
SF Total		8	6	0	.571		-	-	-	-
DET	1978	7	9	0	.438	3rd in NFC Central	-	-	-	-
DET	1979	2	14	0	.125	5th in NFC Central	-	-	-	-
DET	1980	9	7	0	.563	2nd in NFC Central	-	-	-	-
DET	1981	8	8	0	.500	2nd in NFC Central	-	-	-	-
DET	1982	4	5	0	.444	8th in NFC	0	1	.000	Lost to Washington Redskins in First Round
DET	1983	9	7	0	.563	1st in NFC Central	0	1	.000	Lost to San Francisco 49ers in Divisional Round
DET	1984	4	11	1	.267	4th in NFC Central	-	-	-	-
DET Total		43	61	0	.414		0	2	.000	
Total		51	67	0	.433		0	2	.000	

== Personal life ==
Clark's son, Monte Bryan Clark, played quarterback in the National Football League for the Cincinnati Bengals.

On September 16, 2009, Clark died from bone cancer that spread into his liver and lungs.
