= Los Angeles Express =

Los Angeles Express may refer to:

- Los Angeles Express (USFL), a team in the United States Football League (1983–1985)
- Los Angeles Express (newspaper), a daily newspaper in Los Angeles (1871–1962)
- L.A. Express, an American jazz-pop ensemble
