= Tony Norman (gridiron football) =

American gridiron football player (born 1955)

No. 55, 97
- Position: Defensive end

Personal information
- Born: January 27, 1955 (age 71); Atlanta, Georgia, U.S.
- Listed height: 6 ft 5 in (1.96 m)
- Listed weight: 270 lb (122 kg)

Career information
- High school: Atlanta (GA) Carver
- College: Iowa State
- NFL draft: 1979: undrafted

Career history
- Minnesota Vikings (1979)*; Winnipeg Blue Bombers (1980–1986); Minnesota Vikings (1987)
- * Offseason or practice squad member only

Awards and highlights
- Grey Cup champion (1984)

Career NFL statistics
- Games played: 2
- Stats at Pro Football Reference

Career CFL statistics
- Sacks: 59
- Interceptions: 1

Anthony Alexander Norman (born January 27, 1955) is a former American and Canadian football defensive end in the Canadian Football League (CFL) and National Football League (NFL). He played in the CFL for the Winnipeg Blue Bombers and the NFL for the Minnesota Vikings. Norman played college football at Iowa State.
