= Gary Danielson =

American football player and commentator (born 1951)

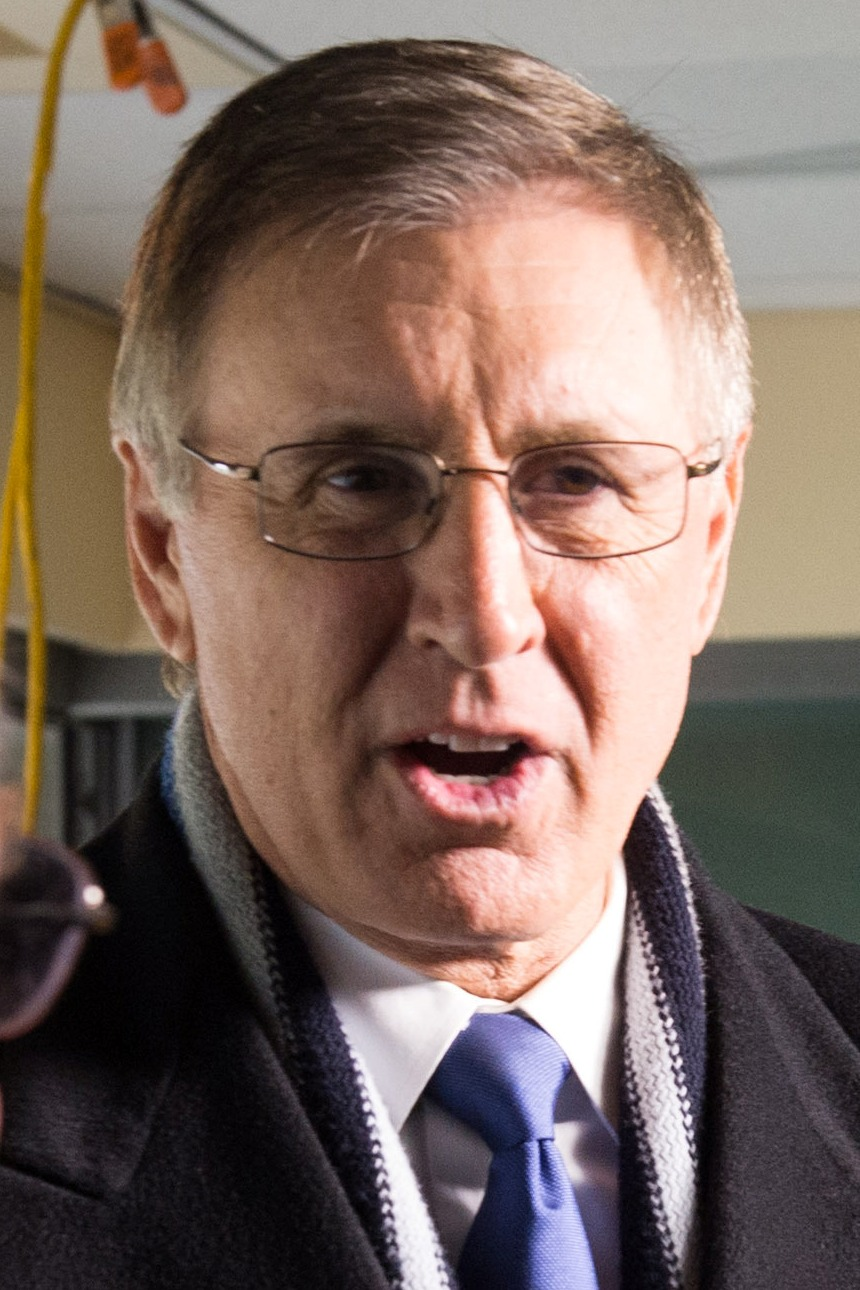
- Danielson in 2013

No. 16, 18
- Position: Quarterback

Personal information
- Born: September 10, 1951 (age 75); Detroit, Michigan, U.S.
- Listed height: 6 ft 2 in (1.88 m)
- Listed weight: 195 lb (88 kg)

Career information
- High school: Divine Child (Dearborn, Michigan)
- College: Purdue (1970–1972)
- NFL draft: 1973: undrafted

Career history
- NY Stars/Charlotte Hornets (1974); Chicago Winds (1975); Detroit Lions (1976–1984); Cleveland Browns (1985–1988)

Career NFL statistics
- Passing attempts: 1,932
- Passing completions: 1,105
- Completion percentage: 57.2%
- TD–INT: 81–78
- Passing yards: 13,764
- Passer rating: 76.6
- Stats at Pro Football Reference

Gary Dennis Danielson (born September 10, 1951) is a former college football commentator and former football quarterback.

Danielson played college football for Purdue from 1969 to 1972. He led the Big Ten Conference in 1971 with a 57.8% completion percentage, 10 touchdown passes, and a 147.6 quarterback rating.

Danielson played professional football in the World Football League in 1974 and 1975 and in the National Football League (NFL) for the Detroit Lions from 1976 to 1984 and for the Cleveland Browns from 1985 to 1988. He broke the Lions' single-season record with 3,223 passing yards in 1980 and also had the second highest total to that time with 3,076 yards in 1984. At the time of his retirement, he ranked third in Lions history with 11,885 passing yards. For his career, he completed 1,105 of 1,932 passes (57.2%) for 13,764 yards, 81 touchdowns and 78 interceptions.

Danielson began his broadcasting career at ESPN from 1990 through 1996, then ABC Sports from 1997 through 2005. In 2006, Danielson joined CBS Sports as the lead analyst for its college football coverage, serving in the role until his retirement at the conclusion of the 2025 season. Danielson received six nominations for Sports Emmy Awards throughout his broadcasting career.

== Early life ==
Danielson was born in Detroit in 1951. He played high school football under Tony Versaci at Divine Child High School in Dearborn, Michigan, graduating in 1969. As the left side wide receiver in his junior year and quarterback in his senior year, he helped Divine Child win two straight Catholic High School League championships.

== College football ==
Danielson played college football at Purdue University from 1969 to 1972. He succeeded Mike Phipps as the Boilermakers' starting quarterback in 1970. His best season was 1971 when he completed 89 of 154 passes for 1,467 yards. He set a Big Ten record in 1971 with a 61.7% passing accuracy, a record that stood until 1985. He also led the Big Ten in 1971 with 10 touchdown passes and a 147.6 quarterback rating. Danielson was also a threat running with the ball. He set a Purdue single-game quarterback record with 213 rushing yards (206 yards in the first half, including runs of 80, 49, 32, and 26 yards) on 16 carries against Washington in September 1972.

Danielson graduated in 1973 with a Bachelor of Science in industrial management. He later earned a master's degree in physical education in 1976.

== Professional football ==
=== Canadian Football League (1973) ===
Danielson was not selected in the NFL draft and instead signed with the Calgary Stampeders of the Canadian Football League (CFL). He was cut after the Stampeders signed Pete Liske. Danielson recalled: "I thought I was doing real well with Calgary. Then they get Liske and I'm out of a job."

After he was released by Calgary, Danielson returned to Purdue where he became a graduate assistant in economics and a coach for the freshman football team. He also began reading "all material possible on the game of football", including Woody Hayes's "Hotline to Victory" and Dave Meggyesy's "Out of Their League", earning a reputation as a football "bookworm."

=== World Football League (1974–1975) ===
In 1974, Danielson signed with the New York Stars of the newly-formed World Football League (WFL). Midway through the season, the team moved to North Carolina and was renamed the Charlotte Hornets. After the move to Charlotte, Danielson saw more playing time after quarterback Tom Sherman dislocated his elbow. Danielson completed 27 of 54 passes for 293 yards and one touchdown and no interceptions for Charlotte.

In July 1975, the Hornets traded Danielson to the Chicago Winds in exchange for a 1976 WFL draft pick. Danielson completed nine of 15 passes for 107 yards. The Winds franchise folded a month before the league's collapse in October 1975.

=== Detroit Lions (1976–1984) ===
Danielson wrote to every team in the National Football League (NFL), but the Detroit Lions were the only team to respond. He signed as a free agent with the Lions in April 1976. He was cut shortly before the opening game of the regular season, and went to work in a friend's sheet metal plant. In mid-October, Danielson was called back to the Lions after somebody got hurt. He remained on the bench during the 1976 season, with no pass attempts, as Greg Landry was the team's starting quarterback and Joe Reed was the backup.

In 1977, Danielson began the season as a backup to Greg Landry but appeared in 13 games with two starts and 445 passing yards.

Danielson had a breakthrough season in 1978. After spending most of the Lions' first five games on the bench, Danielson took over as the Lions' starting quarterback in the final 11 games, completing 199 of 351 passes (56.7%) for 2,294 yards with 18 touchdowns and 17 interceptions. On December 9, he set a Lions record with five touchdown passes in a 45–15 victory over the Minnesota Vikings.

In August 1979, Danielson injured his knee in a preseason game, underwent surgery, and missed the entire 1979 season. Forced to start rookie Jeff Komlo after an injury to backup QB Joe Reed, the Lions tied the 49ers for the NFL's worst record at 2-14.

Danielson returned to the Lions in 1980 and had the best season of his career. He started all 16 games, completing 244 of 417 passes (58.5%) for 3,223 yards with 13 touchdowns and 11 interceptions. Danielson's 3,224 passing yards in 1980 set a Lions' single-season record. He also rushed for a career-high 242 yards on 48 carries (4.8 yards per carry). Despite having his best season, the Lions lost seven of ten games in the middle of the season, and Danielson's hold on the starting quarterback job was described as "shaky". Danielson also became embroiled in a squabble with Detroit general manager Russ Thomas in November 1980, accusing Thomas in an interview of "behind-the-scenes meddling", suggesting a change at quarterback, and failing to keep the disgruntled Lions players happy.

In 1981, Danielson lost the starting quarterback job to Eric Hipple. Danielson started only four games and completed 56 of 96 passes (58.3%) for 784 yards, three touchdowns and five interceptions.The Lions lost the NFC Central Division championship when they were defeated at home in the season finale by Tampa Bay.

In the strike-shortened 1982 season, Danielson started five of nine games for the Lions, completing 100 of 197 passes for 1,343 yards with 10 touchdowns and 14 interceptions.

In 1983, Danielson again lost the starting quarterback job to Eric Hipple. Hipple started all 16 games, and Danielson saw limited action, completing 59 of 113 passes (52.2%) for 720 yards with seven touchdowns and four interceptions.

In 1984, Danielson retook the starting job from Hipple. Danielson started 14 games, completing 252 of 410 passes (61.5%) for 3,076 yards with 17 touchdowns and 15 interceptions. Danielson's 252 completed passes and 61.5% completion percentage both set Lions' single-season records, and his 3,076 yards was the second hightest single-season total in Lions history – trailing only Danielson's 1980 total. He also tallied 218 rushing yards on 41 carries, 5.4 yards per carry. Despite Danielson's efforts, the Lions finished fourth in the NFL Central with a 4–11–1 record.

At the time of his retirement, Danielson ranked third in Detroit Lions history (behind Bobby Layne and Greg Landry) in passing yards (11,885), passes completed (952), and passing touchdowns (69).

=== Cleveland Browns (1985–1988) ===
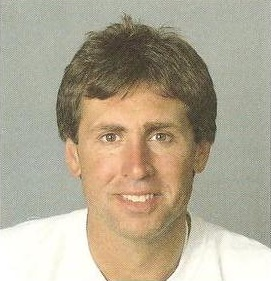
Danielson in 1985

In May 1985, the Cleveland Browns acquired Danielson as a backup to rookie Bernie Kosar. Danielson ended up starting six games for the Browns in 1985, completing 97 of 163 passes (59.5%) for 1,274 yards with eight touchdowns and six interceptions. Bill Livingston of The Plain Dealer rated Danielson's 1985 season at No. 5 on a list of transcendent accomplishments that became symbols of an entire ethos and achievement. Livingston wrote:

This was the season of the "Bad News Browns." . . . The whole season would have been a joke, except that Danielson . . . redeemed it with his great, gallant, grievous courage. Playing with a torn rotator cuff, Danielson quarterbacked season-turning victories over the New York Giants and Cincinnati Bengals. "Whatever it is that compels a man to risk himself for the men at his side arose with Gary Danielson yesterday morning," I wrote. "No one gets called a 'field general' any more. But that's what Danielson is." . . . [W]hat Danielson did in that forgotten season has stayed with me ever since, as the perfect embodiment of self-sacrifice.

Danielson broke an ankle in the 1986 preseason and missed the entire season. Kosar became entrenched as the Browns' starting quarterback, and Danielson saw limited action thereafter. In 1987, he appeared in six games, only one as a starter, completing 25 of 33 passes (75.8%) for 281 yards, four touchdowns, zero interceptions, and a 140.3 quarterback rating. In 1988, his final year in the NFL, Danielson completed 31 of 52 passes (59.6%) for 324 yards.

Danielson and Kosar developed a close relationship during their four years together in Cleveland. They roomed together on the road, huddled together on the sidelines, watched game films and analyzed game plans together, and socialized away from the field. Danielson recalled, "Bernie could always turn to me and say something and I'd know exactly what he was talkng about. Not just about the defense, but about his inner feelings. . . . I also think I was able to take some of the pressure off him in meetings and things like that. I was able to say some of the things he couldn't."

In April 1989, the Browns announced that they would not offer a new contract to Danielson.

=== NFL career statistics ===
Danielson amassed 13,764 passing yards, 1,105 pass completions, and 81 touchdown passes in 101 games in the NFL.

Legend
**Bold**	Career high

==== Regular season ====
Year	Team	Games			Passing									Rushing					Sacks	
Year	Team	GP	GS	Record	Cmp	Att	Pct	Yds	Y/A	Lng	TD	Int	Rtg	Att	Yds	Avg	Lng	TD	Sck	Yds
1976	DET	1	0	0–0	0	0	0.0	0	0.0	0	0	0	0.0	0	0	0.0	0	0	0	0
1977	DET	13	2	1–1	42	100	42.0	445	4.5	61	1	5	38.1	7	62	**8.9**	16	0	9	64
1978	DET	**16**	11	6–5	199	351	56.7	2,294	6.5	47	**18**	**17**	73.5	22	93	4.2	25	0	25	237
1980	DET	**16**	**16**	**9–7**	244	**417**	58.5	**3,223**	7.7	**87**	13	11	82.4	**48**	**232**	4.8	33	2	**44**	**338**
1981	DET	6	4	2–2	56	96	58.3	784	8.2	45	3	5	73.4	9	23	2.6	11	2	12	84
1982	DET	8	5	2–3	100	197	50.8	1,343	6.8	70	10	14	60.1	23	92	4.0	16	0	19	145
1983	DET	10	0	0–0	59	113	52.2	720	6.4	54	7	4	78.0	6	8	1.3	8	0	8	68
1984	DET	15	14	3–10–1	**252**	410	61.5	3,076	7.5	77	17	15	83.1	41	218	5.3	**40**	**3**	41	335
1985	CLE	8	6	4–2	97	163	59.5	1,274	7.8	72	8	6	85.3	25	126	5.0	28	0	17	128
1987	CLE	6	1	1–0	25	33	**75.8**	281	**8.5**	23	4	0	**140.3**	1	0	0.0	0	0	2	4
1988	CLE	2	1	0–1	31	52	59.6	324	6.2	26	0	1	69.7	4	3	0.8	5	0	6	43
Career		101	60	28–31–1	1,105	1,932	57.2	13,764	7.1	87	81	78	76.6	186	857	4.6	40	7	183	1,446

==== Postseason ====
Year	Team	Games			Passing									Rushing					Sacks	
Year	Team	GP	GS	Record	Cmp	Att	Pct	Yds	Y/A	Lng	TD	Int	Rtg	Att	Yds	Avg	Lng	TD	Sck	Yds
1983	DET	**1**	**1**	0–1	**24**	**38**	**63.2**	**236**	**6.2**	**20**	0	**5**	**41.0**	**4**	**17**	**4.3**	**6**	0	**2**	**12**
Career		1	1	0–1	24	38	63.2	236	6.2	20	0	5	41.0	4	17	4.3	6	0	2	12

== Broadcasting career ==
In Cleveland, Danielson co-hosted a sports talk show while a member of the Browns. In January 1990, he was hired by WDIV-TV in Detroit as a sports reporter, substitute sports anchor, and pre-game host for Detroit Tigers games.

In the fall of 1990, Danielson joined ESPN as an analyst for the network's Saturday night college football games. Danielson noted at the time:

I felt I had a story to tell about football that the average fan doesn't see. . . . Once you get the opportunity to do what you want to do, it's up to you to demonstrate the skills that you have. That's how I succeeded in the NFL, and that's what happened with ESPN. I'm finally getting the chance to do what I really want to do – talk about the game I've loved since I was 10 years old.

He worked in that capacity for ESPN for several years, then switching to ABC Sports, where he remained through the 2005 season. In February 2006, he was hired as the lead college football analyst for CBS Sports. He partnered originally with Verne Lundquist (and later Brad Nessler) on the network's primary college football telecasts. Interviewed in 2012, Danielson described noted:

I go through our games, chart it, critique myself, get mad at myself. For me, it's tough to go through my game tapes. I don't know, maybe it's because I wasn't a big star in football, but I take it personal. When I don't point out something I should have, it can grind on me for days.

As of 2023, he had received six Sports Emmy Awards nominations for his work.

Danielson announced his plans to retire from broadcasting at the end of the 2025 college football season and will be replaced by Charles Davis. He called his final game on December 31, 2025, in the 2025 Sun Bowl between the Arizona State Sun Devils and Duke Blue Devils.

== Personal life ==
Danielson is married to wife Kristy with whom he has four children, Matt David Danielson, Kelly Danielson, Tracy Danielson, and Molly Danielson. The two met in college at Purdue, where Kristy's father, George King, was the head basketball coach and athletic director.

The Danielson family resided in Rochester Hills, Michigan and the children attended Rochester Adams High School. His son, Matt, played college football at Northwestern.

Danielson ran an importing and exporting business with former Lions teammate James Jones in the early 1990s. He has also invested in business ventures with former Browns teammate Bernie Kosar.
