= Steve Atkins =

American football player (born 1956)

No. 32, 38
- Position: Running back

Personal information
- Born: June 22, 1956 (age 70); Spotsylvania County, Virginia, U.S.
- Listed height: 6 ft 0 in (1.83 m)
- Listed weight: 216 lb (98 kg)

Career information
- High school: Spotsylvania
- College: Maryland
- NFL draft: 1979: 2nd round, 44th overall pick

Career history
- Green Bay Packers (1979–1981); Philadelphia Eagles (1981)

Awards and highlights
- First-team All-ACC (1978)

Career NFL statistics
- Rushing yards: 488
- Rushing average: 4
- Touchdowns: 3
- Stats at Pro Football Reference

Steve Atkins (born June 22, 1956) is an American former professional football player who was a running back in the National Football League (NFL).

== Early life ==
Atkins was born Steven Elwood Atkins in Spotsylvania County, Virginia.

== Football career ==
Atkins played at the collegiate level at the University of Maryland, College Park.

He was drafted by the Green Bay Packers in the second round of the 1979 NFL draft and played two seasons for the team before splitting the 1981 season with the Packers and the Philadelphia Eagles.
