= Mark Tuinei =

American football player (1960–1999)

No. 71
- Positions: Offensive tackle, center, defensive tackle

Personal information
- Born: March 31, 1960; Oceanside, California, U.S.
- Died: May 6, 1999 (aged 39); Plano, Texas, U.S.
- Listed height: 6 ft 5 in (1.96 m)
- Listed weight: 314 lb (142 kg)

Career information
- High school: Punahou School (Honolulu, Hawaii)
- College: Hawaiʻi
- NFL draft: 1983: undrafted

Career history
- Dallas Cowboys (1983–1997)

Awards and highlights
- 3× Super Bowl champion (XXVII, XXVIII, XXX); 2× Pro Bowl (1994, 1995)

Career NFL statistics
- Games played: 195
- Games started: 147
- Fumble recoveries: 5
- Stats at Pro Football Reference

Mark Pulemau Tuinei (March 31, 1960 – May 6, 1999) was an American professional football player who was an offensive tackle for the Dallas Cowboys of the National Football League (NFL). He played college football for the Hawaii Rainbow Warriors. Known as a "gentle giant", his career lasted for 15 years (1983–1997) and his ability to protect quarterback Troy Aikman and to run-block for running back Emmitt Smith helped them win Super Bowls in 1992, 1993, and 1995 and the NFC East Division in 1985 and 1992–96. He was also selected for the Pro Bowl in 1994 and 1995.

== Early life ==
Tuinei was born in Oceanside, California, and raised in Nānākuli, Hawaii. He attended Punahou School in Honolulu. He was named the Hawaii Prep Lineman of the Year as a senior, won the state shot put championship and was an All-Star basketball player on the same team as Barack Obama.

== College career ==
Tuinei played for two seasons at University of California, Los Angeles where he started at defensive tackle as a sophomore, finishing fifth on the team in tackles. The next year, he decided to drop out of the school before facing the possibility of being expelled after a fight incident.

As a junior, he transferred back home to the University of Hawaiʻi, but was suspended for the year, after being indicted on assault charges that led to spending three months in prison. He was nagged by injuries his senior year and played in only seven games, including 5 starts at defensive tackle.

In 2007, he was inducted into the Hawaii Sports Hall of Fame. In 2015, he was inducted into the Polynesian Hall of Fame.

== Professional career ==
Although he was selected by the Boston Breakers in the 19th round (227th overall) of the 1983 USFL draft, he opted to sign as an undrafted free agent with the Dallas Cowboys in 1983. He made the team as a backup defensive tackle.

Considered one of the strongest players on the team, in his first two years he played mostly on special teams and short yardage situations, while being a backup at both defensive end and defensive tackle.

In the 1985 preseason, the Cowboys offense needed help and like defensive tackles Blaine Nye and Pat Donovan before him, he was switched to play on the offensive line, backing up Tom Rafferty at center.

In 1986, he worked at all three offensive line positions until settling at offensive tackle. However injuries to Kevin Brooks and Don Smerek early in the season, forced him to split time between the defensive and offensive lines. In the fifth week against the Denver Broncos, he led the defensive line with six tackles while replacing an injured Randy White. In the next game, he was named the starting left tackle against the Washington Redskins and remained there for the rest of the season.

In 1987, he was progressing through his second season as the starting left tackle, when he sustained a left knee injury in the Thanksgiving game against the Minnesota Vikings, losing the last month on the injured reserve list. The next year he reinjured the same knee early in the season, but still saw action in 5 games before being put on injured reserve.

In 1989, he didn't miss a play in a game or a practice. In 1990, during a season that experienced a number of players being juggled around the offensive line, Tuinei remained a solid foundation at left tackle, by starting all 13 games he played, and missing 3 contests with a sprained right knee he suffered against the New York Jets.

In 1991, he suffered a groin injury that forced him to miss 4 games, returning to the starting lineup against the Houston Oilers, to help Emmitt Smith lead the NFL in rushing.

In 1992, he started the first 5 games, but injured his back lifting weights in the week leading up to the Kansas City Chiefs contest. He was forced to sit out the game, but was able to return against the Los Angeles Raiders, contributing to Smith earning his second consecutive NFL rushing championship.

In 1994, he suffered back spasms in the first quarter against the Washington Redskins, that required him to spend 2 nights in the hospital and miss the Arizona Cardinals game. He returned to the starting lineup against the Philadelphia Eagles. He helped the offensive line establish a new franchise record by allowing 20 sacks in a season, while being elected for his first Pro Bowl.

In 1995, he contributed to Smith winning his fourth rushing title, score an NFL record 25 rushing touchdowns and gain a club record 1,773 rushing yards. He received his second selection to the Pro Bowl, as part of a line that broke the team record by allowing just 18 sacks in a season.

The next year suffered a torn medial collateral ligament in his right knee in a preseason game against the New England Patriots, which eventually required offseason surgery. Despite the injury, he contributed to the offensive line leading the league in allowing the fewest sacks with 19. He missed playing time against the Atlanta Falcons after re-aggravating his injury in the first quarter. He only sat out the season finale against the Washington Redskins and returned for the playoffs. Knee problems ended his career after the 1997 season, when Larry Allen took over for him at left tackle.

"We just all loved the guy," said former Cowboys quarterback Roger Staubach. "He was just a gentle giant. He was just one of those unsung players that goes out and does their job. He was one of those kind of players every team needs. He was a role model for the NFL." He suffered knee injuries most of his career, yet he would play a total of 195 games, more than any other Cowboys offensive player ever. He also helped to protect Hall of Fame quarterback Troy Aikman and pave the way for Hall of Fame running back Smith to become the National Football League all-time leading rusher.

Tuinei was a key member of the Cowboys offensive line, helping the team win Super Bowl XXVII, XXVIII, and XXX, along with the NFC East Division in 1985 and from 1992 to 1996. His role in some of the greatest offensive lines in NFL history was detailed in the 2013 NFL Network's film A Football Life: "the Great Wall of Dallas".

On April 14, 1998, he was released in a salary-cap move, finishing tied with Ed "Too Tall" Jones and Bill Bates for the most seasons in a Cowboy uniform—with 15. He is considered to be one of the greatest offensive tackles in Cowboys franchise history.

== Death ==
In May 1999, Tuinei was found unconscious in his antique Ford car, and he was pronounced dead upon arrival at a hospital in the Dallas suburb of Plano. He had been planning to return to Punahou School to serve as the offensive line coach. The autopsy revealed that Tuinei died of a combination of heroin and a form of the drug ecstasy. His death was ruled an accidental overdose. Upon the release of the autopsy results, Plano police chief Bruce Glasscock was quoted alleging that it was Tuinei's first experience with heroin.

"What you had was a 39-year-old male, 6'5", in excess of 300 pounds, a healthy individual, took one shot of heroin and basically dropped dead as a result", Glasscock said during his press conference regarding Tuinei.

Tuinei got the heroin from four people who belonged to a drug ring. The four men were charged, tried and convicted for conspiracy to distribute heroin and cocaine. Jesus Carbajal received a life sentence. Julian Solis Perez and Andres Milan were sentenced to eleven-year prison terms, and Favian Ramos received a twelve-year sentence.

== Family and personal life ==
Mark's brother, Tom, was an All-WAC defensive tackle at the University of Hawaiʻi, before playing for the Detroit Lions and the Canadian Football League's Edmonton Eskimos. Another brother, Van, played defensive end in the National Football League. A cousin, Dan Saleaumua, was an All-Pro nose tackle in the NFL. A nephew Lavasier, played wide receiver in the Canadian Football League. Another nephew, Tumua Tuinei III, played defensive back at the University of Hawaiʻi at Mānoa.

In 1982, Mark Tuinei had a small role as a Samoan college student in the episode "Italian Ice" of the TV series Magnum, P.I.

At the time of his death, he was married to Pono Tuinei and had 2 children.
