= Derrel Luce =

American football player (born 1952)

- Luce in 1977

No. 58, 57
- Position: Linebacker

Personal information
- Born: September 29, 1952 (age 74); Lake Jackson, Texas, U.S.
- Listed height: 6 ft 3 in (1.91 m)
- Listed weight: 226 lb (103 kg)

Career information
- High school: Clute (TX) Brazoswood
- College: Baylor
- NFL draft: 1975: 7th round, 168th overall pick

Career history
- Baltimore Colts (1975–1978); Minnesota Vikings (1979–1980); Detroit Lions (1980)

Awards and highlights
- Second-team All-American (1974); First-team All-SWC (1974)

Career NFL statistics
- Games played: 85
- Starts: 21
- QB Sacks: 5
- Interceptions: 3
- Fumble recoveries: 5
- Stats at Pro Football Reference

Derrel Joe Luce (born September 29, 1952) is an American former professional football player who was a linebacker in the National Football League (NFL). He played college football for the Baylor Bears, earning second-team All-American honors 1974. He played six seasons in the NFL for the Baltimore Colts, Minnesota Vikings, and Detroit Lions.

Luce got his NFL opportunity in 1976 when starting linebacker Tom MacLeod was injured. Luce started all 14 games for the Colts during that season, registering 68 solo tackles and 4 assists, as well as the first two of his 3 career interceptions. He also saw action on special teams on the punt coverage unit, recording three more tackles.

He was released by the Colts on August 22, 1979, immediately ahead of the 1979 NFL season, and was claimed off waivers two days later by the Minnesota Vikings, for whom he saw action in all 16 games of the 1979 season. He made the Vikings roster again in 1980 but was released on October 1, after having appeared in four games. The Detroit Lions signed him two weeks later as a free agent and he appeared in the last 9 games of the season for the silver-and-blue.

Luce received a Bachelor of Arts degree in Geology from Baylor in 1975 and subsequently enrolled in Baylor Law School towards the end of his NFL career.
