= Mike Whited =

American football player (born 1958)

No. 74
- Position: Offensive tackle

Personal information
- Born: March 30, 1958 (age 68); Chico, California, U.S.
- Listed height: 6 ft 4 in (1.93 m)
- Listed weight: 250 lb (113 kg)

Career information
- High school: Thomas Downey (Modesto, California)
- College: Pacific
- NFL draft: 1980: undrafted

Career history
- Detroit Lions (1980); Arizona Wranglers (1983)

Career NFL statistics
- Games played: 16
- Games started: 2
- Stats at Pro Football Reference

Michael Douglas Whited (born March 30, 1958) is an American former professional football player who was a tackle for the Detroit Lions of the National Football League (NFL). He played college football for the Pacific Tigers. Whited also played for the Arizona Wranglers of the United States Football League (USFL).
