= Dave Simmons (linebacker, born 1957) =

American football player

No. 61, 63, 60, 57
- Position: Linebacker

Personal information
- Born: January 19, 1957 (age 69); Goldsboro, North Carolina, U.S.
- Listed height: 6 ft 4 in (1.93 m)
- Listed weight: 221 lb (100 kg)

Career information
- High school: Rosewood (Goldsboro)
- College: North Carolina
- NFL draft: 1979: 6th round, 153rd overall pick

Career history
- Green Bay Packers (1979); Detroit Lions (1980); Baltimore Colts (1982); Chicago Bears (1983); Houston Gamblers (1985); Arizona Outlaws (1985)

Career NFL statistics
- Fumble recoveries: 2
- Stats at Pro Football Reference

Dave Simmons (born January 19, 1957) is an American former professional football player who was a linebacker in the National Football League (NFL) and United States Football League (USFL). He played college football for the North Carolina Tar Heels. Simmons was selected by the Green Bay Packers in the sixth round of the 1979 NFL draft and played that season with the team. The following season, he was a member of the Detroit Lions. After a season away from the NFL, he played with the Baltimore Colts during the 1982 NFL season and the Chicago Bears during the 1983 NFL season. In the fall of 1984, Simmons signed with the defending USFL Champion Baltimore Stars but was traded to the Houston Gamblers for a draft choice during training camp in February 1985. Simmons made the opening day roster of the Gamblers, however, was deactivated for the first game at Los Angeles and two days later was waived. Three weeks later, Simmons signed with the Arizona Outlaws and played as a reserve linebacker for the remaining 15 games (starting 3).
