= Tom Turnure =

American football player (born 1957)

No. 55, 60
- Position: Offensive lineman

Personal information
- Born: July 9, 1957 (age 69); Seattle, Washington, U.S.
- Listed height: 6 ft 4 in (1.93 m)
- Listed weight: 250 lb (113 kg)

Career information
- High school: Roosevelt (Seattle, Washington)
- College: Washington
- NFL draft: 1980: 3rd round, 57th overall pick

Career history
- Detroit Lions (1980–1983); Michigan Panthers (1984); Oakland Invaders (1985); Detroit Lions (1985–1986)

Awards and highlights
- First-team All-Pac-10 (1979)

Career NFL statistics
- Games played: 63
- Games started: 0
- Stats at Pro Football Reference

Thomas William Turnure (born July 9, 1957) is an American former professional football player who was an offensive lineman in the National Football League (NFL). In college, Turnure played for the University of Washington and was named to the 1979 All-Pacific-10 Conference football team. Professionally, Turnure played for the Detroit Lions (1980–1983, 1985–1986) for six seasons.
