= James Hunter (American football) =

American football player (1954–2010)

No. 28
- Position: Cornerback

Personal information
- Born: March 8, 1954; Silsbee, Texas, U.S.
- Died: August 2, 2010 (aged 56); Allen Park, Michigan, U.S.
- Listed height: 6 ft 3 in (1.91 m)
- Listed weight: 195 lb (88 kg)

Career information
- High school: Silsbee
- College: Grambling State
- NFL draft: 1976: 1st round, 10th overall pick

Career history
- Detroit Lions (1976–1982)

Awards and highlights
- PFWA All-Rookie Team (1976); First-team All-American (1975)

Career NFL statistics
- Interceptions: 27
- Fumble recoveries: 5
- Defensive TDs: 1
- Stats at Pro Football Reference

James Edward Hunter (March 8, 1954 – August 2, 2010) was an American professional football player who was a cornerback for the Detroit Lions of the National Football League (NFL). Hunter was the 10th player picked in the 1976 NFL draft after playing for Eddie Robinson at Grambling. Hunter is seventh all-time for interceptions in Lions history and is still considered one of the greatest players to ever play at Grambling. His son, Javin Hunter, played for Notre Dame and was drafted by the Baltimore Ravens in 2002. His grandson, Jaden Ivey played basketball at Purdue University and was drafted by the Detroit Pistons in the 2022 NBA draft. Hunter also has a daughter, Marisa Hunter.

Nicknamed "Hound Dog" for his long-striding running ability, Hunter made an instant impact in the NFL. The 6-foot-3, 195-pound cornerback led the Lions with seven pass interceptions and was runner-up to future Pro Football Hall of Famer Mike Haynes as NFL Rookie Defensive Player of the Year. Hunter got his first start in 1976 at free safety, subbing for another Lions’ great, Dick Jauron, who had broken his leg. He shifted to left cornerback in 1977, playing alongside another future Pro Football Hall of Famer, Lem Barney. In his seven seasons with the Lions (1976–82), Hunter led the Lions in three seasons in pass interceptions (1976, ’77 and ’80) and had 27 career interceptions. He played in 86 Lions games before a neck injury sustained late in the 1982 season ended his career.

Hunter, Jimmy "Spiderman" Allen, and David Hill recorded a remake of Queen's hit "Another One Bites the Dust" in 1980.

On November 14, 2019, it was announced that Hunter would be part of the 2020 Black College Football Hall of Fame induction class. He was officially inducted during ceremonies held on February 22, 2020,

== Awards ==
- Inducted into African-American Sports Hall of Fame (1996)
- Inducted into Southwestern Athletic Conference Hall of Fame (SWAC) (1997)
- inducted into the Black College Football Hall of Fame (2020)
