= Eddie Cole (linebacker) =

American football player (born 1956)

No. 50
- Position: Linebacker

Personal information
- Born: December 16, 1956 (age 69); Clarkside, Mississippi, U.S.
- Listed height: 6 ft 2 in (1.88 m)
- Listed weight: 235 lb (107 kg)

Career information
- High school: Clarksdale
- College: Ole Miss
- NFL draft: 1979: 11th round, 302nd overall pick

Career history
- Detroit Lions (1979)
- Stats at Pro Football Reference

Edward Lee Cole (born December 16, 1956) is an American former professional football player who was a linebacker for the Detroit Lions of the National Football League (NFL). He played college football for the Ole Miss Rebels.
