= Tom Tuinei =

American football player (born 1958)

No. 71
- Position: Defensive tackle

Personal information
- Born: February 21, 1958 (age 68); Oceanside, California, U.S.
- Listed height: 6 ft 4 in (1.93 m)
- Listed weight: 250 lb (113 kg)

Career information
- High school: Waianae (HI)
- College: Hawaii
- NFL draft: 1980: 9th round, 223rd overall pick

Career history
- Detroit Lions (1980); Edmonton Eskimos (1982–1987)

Awards and highlights
- 2× Grey Cup champion (1982, 1987); WAC Newcomer of the Year (1979)

Career NFL statistics
- Games played: 12
- Stats at Pro Football Reference

Tumua Tuinei (born February 21, 1958) is an American former professional football player who was a defensive tackle in the National Football League (NFL) and Canadian Football League (CFL). He played college football for the Hawaii Rainbow Warriors. Tuinei played in the NFL for the Detroit Lions in 1980 and in the CFL for the Edmonton Eskimos from 1982 to 1987. His brother Mark Tuinei also played professionally.
