= Ken Fantetti =

American football player (born 1957)

No. 57
- Position: Linebacker

Personal information
- Born: April 7, 1957 (age 69); Toledo, Oregon, U.S.
- Listed height: 6 ft 2 in (1.88 m)
- Listed weight: 230 lb (104 kg)

Career information
- High school: Gresham (OR)
- College: Wyoming
- NFL draft: 1979: 2nd round, 37th overall pick

Career history
- Detroit Lions (1979–1985)

Awards and highlights
- First-team All-American (1978); WAC Lineman of the Year (1978)

Career NFL statistics
- Sacks: 3.5
- Interceptions: 6
- Fumble recoveries: 2
- Stats at Pro Football Reference

Kenneth Mark Fantetti (born April 7, 1957) is an American former professional football player who was a linebacker in the National Football League (NFL) for the Detroit Lions from 1979 through 1985. He played college football for the Wyoming Cowboys.

Fantetti was born in Toledo, Oregon, in 1957 and played college football at the University of Wyoming from 1975 to 1978. As a senior in 1978, he had 124 tackles, including 73 unassisted tackles, and was selected as an All-American by the Football Writers Association of America. He had 15 unassisted tackles and nine assists in a 1978 game against Utah. He was also selected as the Western Athletic Conference Defensive Player of the Year in 1978.

He was selected by the Detroit Lions in the second round (37th overall pick) of the 1979 NFL draft. At the time, Lions head coach Monte Clark called Fantetti "a deluxe hitter -- which means he's something special. He's an old fashioned, rough and tough, hard-nosed football player." Fantetti played in 95 games for the Lions from 1979 to 1985.

In 2008, Fantetti opened a barbecue restaurant called Big Ken's BBQ in Portland, Oregon.

He was inducted into the University of Wyoming Athletics Hall of Fame in 2003. Fantetti's biography at the Hall of Fame describes him as one of "greatest impact players" and "devastating linebackers" in Wyoming history.
