= Walt Williams (cornerback) =

American football player (born 1954)

No. 21, 44, 43
- Position: Cornerback

Personal information
- Born: July 10, 1954 (age 72); Bedford Hills, New York, U.S.
- Listed height: 6 ft 1 in (1.85 m)
- Listed weight: 185 lb (84 kg)

Career information
- College: New Mexico State
- NFL draft: 1977: 2nd round, 42nd overall pick

Career history
- Detroit Lions (1977–1980); Minnesota Vikings (1981–1982); Chicago Bears (1982-1983)

Career NFL statistics
- Interceptions: 4
- Fumble recoveries: 1
- Defensive TDs: 1
- Stats at Pro Football Reference

Walter Williams (born July 10, 1954) is an American former professional football player who was a cornerback in the National Football League (NFL) and restaurateur. He played college football for the New Mexico State Aggies.

Born in the South Bronx, N.Y., Williams and his five siblings became wards of the state at age 7. He lived in two children's shelters, spending most of his time at one in Westchester County, learning culinary arts and playing football.

After high school, he started hitchhiking to California but ended up in New Mexico. He attended New Mexico State University in Las Cruces, where he played football. He was a second round draft pick for the Detroit Lions in the 1970s. He moved on to the Minnesota Vikings and Chicago Bears, playing a total of eight years.

He played seven seasons for the Detroit Lions, the Minnesota Vikings, and the Chicago Bears. After retiring from football in the early 1980s, Williams started a real estate development company in New Mexico. When the market crashed, he lost about $480 million. He moved to Dallas and started a restaurant called Sweet Georgia Brown.
