= John Woodcock (American football) =

American football player (1954–1998)

No. 77, 90
- Position: Defensive tackle/end

Personal information
- Born: March 19, 1954; Eureka, California, U.S.
- Died: August 23, 1998 (aged 44); Fremont, California, U.S.
- Listed height: 6 ft 3 in (1.91 m)
- Listed weight: 246 lb (112 kg)

Career information
- High school: Washington (Fremont, California)
- College: Hawaii
- NFL draft: 1976: 3rd round, 76th overall pick

Career history
- Detroit Lions (1976–1980); San Diego Chargers (1981–1982)

Career NFL statistics
- Sacks: 27
- Fumble recoveries: 8
- Stats at Pro Football Reference

John Maurer Woodcock (March 19, 1954 – August 23, 1998) was an American professional football defensive lineman who played professionally in the National Football League (NFL).

== Early life ==
He attended Washington High School in Fremont, California.

== Career ==
Woodcock was a standout defensive tackle under Coach Larry Price at the University of Hawaii (1974–1975). He was a third-round selection in the 1976 NFL draft of the Detroit Lions and went on to play for the Lions (1976–1980) and the San Diego Chargers (1981–1982).

== Death ==
He died from a heart attack at his home in Fremont at the age of 44. The song "In Every Age" was dedicated to his memory by sacred music composer Janèt Sullivan Whitaker.
