= Tommie Ginn =

American football player (born 1958)

No. 66
- Positions: Center, guard

Personal information
- Born: January 25, 1958 (age 68); Scotia, California, U.S.
- Listed height: 6 ft 3 in (1.91 m)
- Listed weight: 253 lb (115 kg)

Career information
- High school: Berryville (Berryville, Arkansas)
- College: Arkansas
- NFL draft: 1980: 5th round, 120th overall pick

Career history
- Detroit Lions (1980–1981)

Awards and highlights
- PFWA All-Rookie Team (1980)

Career NFL statistics
- Games played: 27
- Games started: 5
- Stats at Pro Football Reference

Tommie Ginn (born January 25, 1958) is an American former professional football player who was a center for two seasons with the Detroit Lions of the National Football League (NFL).
