= Eddie Lewis (American football) =

American football player (born 1953)

No. 22, 48
- Position: Defensive back

Personal information
- Born: December 15, 1953 (age 72); Mobile, Alabama, U.S.
- Listed height: 6 ft 0 in (1.83 m)
- Listed weight: 177 lb (80 kg)

Career information
- High school: Toulminville (Mobile)
- College: Kansas
- NFL draft: 1976: 2nd round, 57th overall pick

Career history
- San Francisco 49ers (1976–1979); Detroit Lions (1979–1980)

Career NFL statistics
- Interceptions: 3
- Fumble recoveries: 2
- Sacks: 1
- Stats at Pro Football Reference

Edward Lee Lewis (born December 15, 1953) is an American former professional football player who was a defensive back in the National Football League (NFL). He played college football for the Kansas Jayhawks. Lewis was selected by the San Francisco 49ers in the second round of the 1976 NFL draft. He played five seasons for the 49ers from 1976 to 1979 and the Detroit Lions from 1979 to 1980.

Competing for the Kansas Jayhawks track and field team, Lewis won the 1974 NCAA Division I Outdoor Track and Field Championships in the 4 × 110 yard relay.
