= Ray Williams (American football) =

American football player (born 1958)

No. 30
- Position: Running back

Personal information
- Born: September 22, 1958 (age 68); Welch, West Virginia, U.S.
- Listed height: 5 ft 9 in (1.75 m)
- Listed weight: 170 lb (77 kg)

Career information
- High school: San Fernando (San Fernando, California)
- College: Washington State
- NFL draft: 1980: 12th round, 307th overall pick

Career history
- Detroit Lions (1980–1981)

Career NFL statistics
- Rushing yards: 17
- Rushing average: 8.5
- Total touchdowns: 3
- Stats at Pro Football Reference

Raymond Darrell Williams (born September 22, 1958) is an American former professional football player who was a running back for the Detroit Lions of the National Football League (NFL). He played college football for the Washington State Cougars.
