= John Arnold (American football) =

American football player (born 1955)

No. 47
- Position: Wide receiver

Personal information
- Born: October 5, 1955 (age 71); Shizuoka, Japan
- Listed height: 5 ft 10 in (1.78 m)
- Listed weight: 175 lb (79 kg)

Career information
- High school: Parkland (WA) Washington
- College: Wyoming
- NFL draft: 1979: undrafted

Career history
- Detroit Lions (1979–1980); Denver Gold (1984-1985)

Career NFL statistics
- Games: 17
- Punt returns: 47
- Kickoff returns: 32
- Stats at Pro Football Reference

John Richard Arnold (born October 5, 1955) is an American former professional football player who was a wide receiver in the National Football League (NFL) and United States Football League (USFL). He played college football for the Wyoming Cowboys and played in the NFL with the Detroit Lions in 1979 and 1980.

Arnold was born in Shizuoka, Japan, the son of an American serviceman and Japanese woman. Arnold played college football at the University of Wyoming. Before his junior season with the Cowboys, three fingers on his left hand were severed after an accident during his offseason job at a lumber processing plant in Seattle, Washington, on July 27, 1977. His fingers were sewed back on, but Arnold missed the 1977 season.

He signed a two-year contract with the Detroit Lions in the spring of 1979. He was released before the start of the regular season. By October 31, he was re-signed by the team after an injury to fellow wide receiver Luther Blue. He was waived by Detroit before the 1981 season began.

In March 1982, Arnold was awarded $400,000 in damages by a superior court for the injuries he sustained in 1977 that resulted in the loss of his fingers, with Arnold's attorneys arguing the injury cost the player a high spot in the National Football League Draft.
