= Wayne Smith (defensive back) =

American football player (born 1957)

No. 44, 41, 40
- Position: Cornerback

Personal information
- Born: May 9, 1957 (age 69); Chicago, Illinois, U.S.
- Listed height: 6 ft 0 in (1.83 m)
- Listed weight: 171 lb (78 kg)

Career information
- High school: Harper (Chicago)
- College: Wisconsin-La Crosse; Purdue
- NFL draft: 1980: 11th round, 278th overall pick

Career history
- Detroit Lions (1980–1982); St. Louis Cardinals (1982-1986); Indianapolis Colts (1987)*; Minnesota Vikings (1987)
- * Offseason or practice squad member only

Awards and highlights
- Second-team All-Big Ten (1979)

Career NFL statistics
- Interceptions: 10
- Fumble recoveries: 9
- Sacks: 2.5
- Stats at Pro Football Reference

Wayne Lester Smith (born May 9, 1957) is an American former professional football player who was a defensive back for eight seasons in the National Football League (NFL). A graduate of Chicago's Harper High School, he played college football for the Purdue Boilermakers and was an 11th round selection (278th overall pick) in the 1980 NFL draft by the Detroit Lions. He played for the Lions (1980–1982), St. Louis Cardinals (1982–1986), and Minnesota Vikings (1987).

Wayne has two daughters, Cha-Chi and Chasaty Smith. He is married to Toi Robertson-Smith.
