= Amos Fowler =

American football player (born 1956)

No. 65
- Positions: Center, guard

Personal information
- Born: February 11, 1956 (age 70); Pensacola, Florida, U.S.
- Listed height: 6 ft 3 in (1.91 m)
- Listed weight: 250 lb (113 kg)

Career information
- High school: Fort Walton Beach (FL)
- College: Southern Miss
- NFL draft: 1978: 5th round, 121st overall pick

Career history
- Detroit Lions (1978–1984)

Career NFL statistics
- Games played: 97
- Games started: 49
- Fumble recoveries: 6
- Stats at Pro Football Reference

Amos Emanuel Fowler (born February 11, 1956) is an American former professional football player who was a center for seven seasons with the Detroit Lions of the National Football League (NFL). He played college football for the Southern Miss Golden Eagles.
