= Jesse Thompson (American football) =

American football player (born 1956)

No. 84
- Position: Wide receiver

Personal information
- Born: March 12, 1956 (age 70); Merced, California, U.S.
- Listed height: 6 ft 0 in (1.83 m)
- Listed weight: 191 lb (87 kg)

Career information
- High school: Merced
- College: California
- NFL draft: 1978: 6th round, 165th overall pick

Career history
- Detroit Lions (1978–1980)

Career NFL statistics
- Games played: 22
- Receptions: 29
- Receiving yards: 312
- Receiving TDs: 4
- Stats at Pro Football Reference

Jesse Thompson III (born March 12, 1956) is an American former professional football player who was a wide receiver for the Detroit Lions of the National Football League (NFL). He played college football for the California Golden Bears.
