= Homer Elias =

American football player (1955–2001)

No. 61
- Position: Guard

Personal information
- Born: May 1, 1955; Fort Benning, Georgia, U.S.
- Died: October 3, 2001 (aged 46); Detroit, Michigan, U.S.
- Listed height: 6 ft 3 in (1.91 m)
- Listed weight: 255 lb (116 kg)

Career information
- College: Tennessee State
- NFL draft: 1978: 4th round, 107th overall pick

Career history
- Detroit Lions (1978–1984)

Awards and highlights
- PFWA All-Rookie Team (1978)

Career NFL statistics
- Games played: 96
- Games started: 87
- Fumble recoveries: 5
- Stats at Pro Football Reference

Homer Cary Elias (/iːˈlaɪəs/ ee-LY-əs; May 1, 1955 – October 3, 2001) was an American professional football player who was a guard for seven seasons with the Detroit Lions in the National Football League (NFL). After playing college football at Tennessee State University, Elias appeared in 96 career NFL games, with a 39 average.

He was a fourth-round selection (107th overall) in the 1978 NFL draft by the Detroit Lions which had acquired the pick along with Freddie Scott from the Baltimore Colts for Herb Orvis one day earlier on May 1, 1978.

Homer Elias died on October 3, 2001, of an apparent heart attack. He was 46 years old.
