= Karl Baldischwiler =

American football player (born 1956)

No. 76, 72
- Position: Tackle

Personal information
- Born: January 19, 1956 (age 70); Okmulgee, Oklahoma, U.S.
- Listed height: 6 ft 5 in (1.96 m)
- Listed weight: 265 lb (120 kg)

Career information
- High school: Okmulgee
- College: Oklahoma
- NFL draft: 1978: 7th round, 178th overall pick

Career history
- Detroit Lions (1978–1982); Baltimore/Indianapolis Colts (1983–1986)

Awards and highlights
- 2× National champion (1974, 1975); First-team All-Big Eight (1977)

Career NFL statistics
- Games played: 118
- Games started: 100
- Stats at Pro Football Reference

John Karl Baldischwiler (born January 19, 1956) is an American former professional football player who was an offensive tackle for nine seasons in the National Football League (NFL) from 1978 to 1986. He played college football for the Oklahoma Sooners.

Baldischwiler has a son (Matt) and a daughter (Elizabeth), both in their 20s.. He is currently a principal engineer at a civil engineering consulting firm in Oklahoma City.
