= Ken Callicutt =

American football player (born 1955)

No. 31
- Position: Running back

Personal information
- Born: August 20, 1955 (age 71); Chester, South Carolina, U.S.
- Listed height: 6 ft 0 in (1.83 m)
- Listed weight: 190 lb (86 kg)

Career information
- College: Clemson
- NFL draft: 1978: undrafted

Career history
- Detroit Lions (1978–1982)

Career NFL statistics
- Rushing yards: 6
- Rushing average: 2
- Receptions: 5
- Receiving yards: 59
- Stats at Pro Football Reference

Kenneth Byron Callicutt (born August 20, 1955) is an American former professional football player who was a running back for the Detroit Lions of the National Football League (NFL). He played college football for the Clemson Tigers before playing in the NFL for the Lions for four years.
