= James Harrell (American football) =

American football player and coach (born 1957)

No. 51, 58, 50
- Position: Linebacker

Personal information
- Born: July 19, 1957 (age 69); Tampa, Florida, U.S.
- Listed height: 6 ft 1 in (1.85 m)
- Listed weight: 224 lb (102 kg)

Career information
- High school: Chamberlain (Tampa)
- College: Florida
- NFL draft: 1979: undrafted

Career history

Playing
- Denver Broncos (1979)*; Detroit Lions (1979–1983); Tampa Bay Bandits (1984-1985); Detroit Lions (1985–1986); Kansas City Chiefs (1987)
- * Offseason or practice squad member only

Coaching
- Jesuit High School (1994–2004); Plant High School (2005–2008); Freedom High School (2009); Jesuit High School (2010–2012); Kentucky Christian University (2013–present)

Career NFL statistics
- Sacks: 2.5
- Interceptions: 1
- Fumbles recovered: 4
- Stats at Pro Football Reference

James Clarence Harrell, Jr. (born July 19, 1957) is an American former professional football player who was a linebacker for nine seasons in the National Football League (NFL) and the United States Football League (USFL) during the 1970s and 1980s. He played college football for the Florida Gators, and thereafter, he played for the Detroit Lions and Kansas City Chiefs of the NFL and the Tampa Bay Bandits of the USFL.

== Early life ==
Harrell was born in Tampa, Florida, in 1957. He attended Chamberlain High School in Tampa, and he played high school football for the Chamberlain Chiefs.

== College career ==
Harrell turned down athletic scholarships from smaller colleges; he wanted to play for a major college football program. He attended the University of Florida in Gainesville, Florida, where he played for coach Doug Dickey's Gators teams from 1975 to 1978. He was a walk-on who wanted to play linebacker, but Dickey discouraged it and said that the Gators needed more depth at strong safety, so Harrell set out to learn a position he had never played. He played for the Gators freshman team, and earned a scholarship at the end of his first season. When he returned for his second season he had beefed up from 185 pounds to 220, and Dickey asked him to move to defensive end. Still, he was not a starter, but he became a serious student and threw himself into his special teams play. As a senior in 1978, he finally became a principal back-up and saw significant game time.

Harrell returned to Gainesville during the NFL off-season and completed his bachelor's degree in public relations in 1984.

== Professional career ==
The Denver Broncos signed Harrell as an undrafted free agent in May 1979, but waived him before the start of the 1979 season. The Detroit Lions claimed him off waivers, and he played eight seasons for the Lions from 1979 to 1983 and from 1985 to 1986, and one season for the Kansas City Chiefs in 1987. He also played for the USFL's Tampa Bay Bandits from 1984 to 1985. During his two USFL seasons with the Bandits, he compiled three interceptions and 5.5 quarterback sacks.

During his eight NFL seasons, Harrell appeared in eighty-nine games and started thirty-two of them.

== Life after the NFL ==
In 2005, Harrell became the co-defensive coordinator for the Plant Panthers of Plant High School in Tampa, and in the next four years the Panthers won two Florida Class 4A state championships. In February 2009, Harrell became the head coach of the Freedom Patriots of Freedom High School in Tampa, and, in 2010, he accepted an offer to be the head coach of the Tampa Jesuit Tigers of Jesuit High School, a private Catholic preparatory school in Tampa. Harrell was previously an assistant coach at Jesuit for eleven seasons from 1994 to 2004.

== See also ==
- List of Detroit Lions players
- List of Florida Gators in the NFL draft
- List of University of Florida alumni
