= Jimmy Allen (American football) =

American football player (1952–2019)

No. 45, 40, 35
- Position: Defensive back

Personal information
- Born: March 6, 1952; Clearwater, Florida, U.S.
- Died: December 21, 2019 (aged 67)
- Listed height: 6 ft 2 in (1.88 m)
- Listed weight: 194 lb (88 kg)

Career information
- High school: Los Angeles (Los Angeles, California)
- College: UCLA
- NFL draft: 1974: 4th round, 100th overall pick

Career history
- Pittsburgh Steelers (1974–1977); Detroit Lions (1978–1981)

Awards and highlights
- 2× Super Bowl champion (IX, X); First-team All-American (1973); First-team All-Pac-8 (1973)

Career NFL statistics
- Interceptions: 31
- Fumble recoveries: 6
- Defensive touchdowns: 1
- Stats at Pro Football Reference

James Lee Allen (March 6, 1952 - December 21, 2019) was an American professional football player who was a defensive back in the National Football League (NFL). He played college football for the UCLA Bruins and was selected by the Pittsburgh Steelers in the fourth round of the 1974 NFL draft.

A 1970 graduate of Los Angeles High School, Allen played college football at Pierce College and the University of California, Los Angeles. He was selected by the Pittsburgh Steelers in their celebrated 1974 draft. Allen played for the Steelers for four seasons, where he was a member of their Super Bowls IX & X teams. He was traded to the Detroit Lions in 1978. His nickname during his playing career was "Spiderman." He was the lead singer on the Lions' 1980 recording of Another One Bites the Dust. Briefly homeless at one time, Allen lived in southern California. Allen was elected to the Pierce College Hall of Fame in 2012.
