= List of people with given name Martin =

Following is a list of people with the given name Martin:

Martin may refer to:

== Religious figures ==
- Pope Marinus I (also known as Pope Martin II), Pope (882–884)
- Pope Marinus II (also known as Pope Martin III) (died 946), Pope (942–946)
- Pope Martin I (died 655), saint and Pope (649–655)
- Pope Martin IV (c. 1210–1285), Pope (1281–1285), born Simon de Brion
- Pope Martin V (c. 1368–1431), Pope (1417–1431), born Odo Colona
- Martin of Braga (c. 520–580), archbishop of Braga
- Martin of Leon (c. 1130–1203), Spanish saint and Augustinian canon
- Saint Marinus (also known as Martin) (died c. 366), namesake of San Marino

== Kings and generals ==
- Martin I of Sicily (c. 1374–1409), King of Sicily, ruled 1390–1409
- Martin of Aragon (1356–1410), King of Sicily, ruled 1396–1410, also known as Martin II of Sicily, 1409–1410
- Martin (magister militum per Armeniam) (fl. 531–556), Byzantine Empire general

== A ==
- Martin Aagaard (1863–1913), Norwegian painter
- Martin Abildgaard (born 2002), Danish gymnast
- Martin Ahlgren (born 1975), Swedish cinematographer
- Martín de Álzaga (1755–1812), Spanish merchant and politician
- Martín de Álzaga (racing driver) (1901–1982), Argentine racing driver
- Martin Akakia (1497–1551), physician of King Francis I of France
- Martin Amlin (born 1953), American composer and pianist
- Martin Andanar (born 1974), Filipino news anchor, radio commentator and voice-over artist
- Martin Armiger (1949–2019), Australian musician, member of the rock band The Sports
- Martin Atkins (born 1959), English drummer
- Martin Axenrot (born 1979), drummer for Opeth

== B ==
- Martin Balasus (born 1986), German politician
- Martin Bartenstein (born 1953), Austrian businessman and politician
- Martín Begiristain (born 1965), Spanish footballer
- Martin Bieber (1900–1974), German general and Knight's Cross recipient
- Martin Birrane (1935–2018), Irish businessman and racing driver
- Martin Bobb-Semple (born 1998), English actor
- Martin Bonnet (born 1968), German engineer
- Martin Bormann (1900–1945), Nazi official, head of the Parteikanzlei
- Martin Bourboulon (born 1979), French film director and screenwriter
- Martin Bove, American politician
- Martin Breunig (born 1992), German basketball player
- Martin Bridson (born 1964), Manx mathematician
- Martin Brodeur (1972), Canadian ice hockey goaltender
- Martin Brudermüller (born 1961), German businessman, CEO of BASF
- Martin A. Brumbaugh (fl. 1940s), American statistician
- Martin Brundle (born 1959), British racing driver and commentator
- Martin Bryant (born 1967), Australian perpetrator of the 1996 Port Arthur massacre
- Martin Buber (1878–1965), Israeli philosopher, translator and educator
- Martin Bucer (1491–1551), Protestant reformer
- Martin Buehler, American electrical engineer

== C ==
- Martín Cáceres (born 1987), Uruguayan footballer
- Martin Cao (born 1993), Chinese racing driver
- Martin Cattalini (born 1973), Australian basketballer
- Martin Chivers (1945–2026), English footballer
- Martin Clark (disambiguation)
- Martin Clarke (footballer) (born 1987), Gaelic and Australian rules footballer
- Martin Clarke (journalist) (born 1964 or 1965), British journalist
- Marty Clarke (basketball) (born 1967), Australian basketball player and coach
- Martin Clunes (born 1961), British actor
- Martin L. Cody (born 1941), American ecologist
- Martin Compston (born 1984), Scottish actor and professional footballer
- Martin Cooper (disambiguation)
- Martin Conway (disambiguation)
- Martín Cortés (son of Malinche) (c. 1523–1595), first recorded Mexican Mestizo, son of Hernán Cortés and La Malinche

== D ==
- Martin Damm (born 1972), Czech tennis player
- Martin Davies (disambiguation)
- Martin Davis (disambiguation)
- Martín de Porres (1579–1639), Catholic patron saint of people of mixed race
- Martin del Rosario (born 1992), Filipino model and actor
- Martin Delavallée (born 2004), Belgian footballer
- Martin Chester Deming (1789–1851), American businessman and politician
- Martín Dihigo (1906–1971), Cuban baseball player
- Martin Donnelly (racing driver) (born 1964), British racing driver
- Martin Dunbar-Nasmith (1883–1965), English Royal Navy officer
- Martin Durham (1951–2022), British political scientist
- Martin Dzúr (1919–1985), Czechoslovak army general and defense minister (1968–1985)

== E ==
- Martin Eberts (born 1957), German diplomat
- Martin Ebner (born 1945), Swiss billionaire businessman
- Martin Edwards Park (born 2008), Canadian-Korean singer and producer
- Martin Erat (born 1981), Czech ice hockey player
- Martin Eriksson (born 1965), stage name E-Type (musician), Swedish musician
- Martin Eriksson (athlete) (born 1971), Swedish pole vaulter

== F ==
- Martin Fiennes, 22nd Baron Saye and Sele (born 1961), British venture capitalist and peer
- Martin Filipovski (born 1986), guitarist for the Macedonian rock band Next Time
- Martin Fillo (born 1986), Czech footballer
- Martin Fitzgerald (hurler) (born 1991), Irish hurler
- Martin Fitzgerald (politician) (1867–1927), Irish senator
- Martin Fourcade (born 1988), French biathlete
- Martin Fox (businessman), gambling operator and owner of the Tropicana Club in Havana, Cuba
- Martin S. Fox (1924–2020), American publisher
- Martin Freeman (born 1971), English actor
- Marty Friedman (born 1962), American guitarist
- Martin Frobisher (c. 1535–1594), English privateer, explorer and admiral

== G ==
- Martín García (disambiguation)
- Martin Gardner (1914–2010), American writer on mathematics, magic, science and puzzles
- Martin Garrix (born 1996), Dutch musician, DJ and record producer
- Marty Glickman (1917–2001), American athlete and radio announcer
- Martin Goodman (disambiguation)
- Martin Gore (born 1961), British singer and songwriter with Depeche Mode
- Martin Goulet Jr., Canadian racing driver
- Marty Grebb (1945–2020), American musician, member of The Buckinghams
- Martin Grohe (born 1967), German mathematician and computer scientist
- Martin Grossman (1965–2010), American murderer
- Martin Guerre (c. 1524–1560), French peasant who left his wife, child, and village and returned after an imposter had assumed his place

== H ==
- Martin Haese (born 1965), Australian politician
- Martin Hanngren (1880–1945), Swedish Army lieutenant general
- Martin Hansen (disambiguation)
- Martin Harris (swimmer) (born 1969), English backstroke swimmer
- Martin Häusling (born 1961), German politician
- Martin Hoberg Hedegaard (born 1992), Danish singer
- Martin Heggelund (born 1983), Danish para-cyclist
- Martin Heidegger (1889–1976), German philosopher
- Martin Heinrich (born 1971), American politician
- Martin Hellan (born 2003), Norwegian footballer
- Martin Hengel (1926–2009), German theologian
- Martin Hinteregger (born 1992), Austrian footballer
- Martin Horntveth (born 1977), Norwegian musician
- Martin Hurt (born 1984), Estonian footballer

== J ==
- Martín Jaite (born 1964), Argentine tennis player
- Martin Jarmond (born 1980), American college sports administrator and basketball player
- Martin Jarvis (actor) (born 1941), British-American voice actor
- Martin Jarvis (conductor) (born 1951), Australian conductor and lecturer in music
- Martin Christopher Jarvis (born 1970), known as Chris Jarvis (presenter), English actor, presenter and writer
- Martin Jensen (disambiguation)
- Martin Johnson (rugby union) (born 1970), English rugby union player
- Martin Jonsterhaug (born 2000), Norwegian politician

== K ==
- Martin Kaalma (born 1977), Estonian football goalkeeper
- Martin David Kahane (1932–1990), birth name of Jewish leader Rabbi Meir Kahane
- Martin Kastengren (1891–1972), Swedish diplomat
- Martin Klein (disambiguation)
- Martin Kennedy (disambiguation)
- Martin Luther King Jr. (1929–1968), American civil rights activist
- Martin Kippenberger (1953–1997), German painter
- Martin J. Klein (1924–2009), American science historian
- Martin Kližan (born 1989), Slovak tennis player
- Martin Kohlroser (1905–1967), German Waffen-SS commander during World War II
- Martin Konrad (born 1978), Austrian racing driver
- Martin Koopman (born 1956), Dutch footballer and football manager
- Martin Kratt (born 1965), American educational nature show host
- Martin Kukk (born 1987), Estonian politician
- Martin Kupper (born 1989), Estonian discus thrower
- Martin Kvamme (born 1975), Norwegian graphic designer and illustrator

== L ==
- Martin Landau (1928-2017), American actor
- Martin Landaluce (born 2006), Spanish tennis player
- Martin Lang (disambiguation)
- Martin Laurendeau (born 1964), Canadian tennis player
- Martin Lawrence (born 1965), American television and movie actor
- Martin Lee (tennis) (born 1978), British tennis player
- Martin van Leeuwen (born 1981), Dutch footballer
- Martin Lewis (financial journalist) (born 1972), English financial journalist and broadcaster
- Martin C. Libicki (born 1952), American academic
- Martin Lipp (1854–1923), Estonian poet
- Martin Loo (born 1988), Estonian cross-country mountain biker
- Martin Lopez (born 1978), Swedish-Uruguayan drummer for the death metal band Opeth
- Martin Lukeman (born 1985), English professional darts player
- Martin Luther (1483–1546), founder of Protestantism

== M ==
- Martin Magga (1953–2014), member of the National Parliament of the Solomon Islands
- Martin A. Maland (1846–1944), American businessman, farmer and politician
- Martin Mayhew (born 1965), American football player and executive
- Martin McGuinness (1950–2017), deputy First Minister of Northern Ireland and erstwhile member of the Provisional Irish Republican Army
- Martin Meehan (Irish republican) (1945–2007), Sinn Féin politician and erstwhile member of the Provisional Irish Republican Army
- Martín Méndez (born 1978), bass player for band Opeth
- Martin A. Meyer (1879–1923), American rabbi
- Martin Miller (disambiguation)
- Martin Mittag (born 1982), German politician
- Martín Mondragón (born 1953), Mexican long-distance runner
- Martin Moss (businessman) (1923–2007), British managing director of the London department store Woollands
- Martin Moss (American football) (born 1958), American football player
- Martin Müürsepp (born 1974), Estonian professional basketball player
- Martin Siebenbrunner (born 1968), Austrian photographer and entrepreneur
- Martin Urtel (1914–1989), German actor

== N ==
- Martin Nathell (born 1995), Swedish canoeist
- Martin Ndtoungou (born 1958), Cameroonian football coach
- Martin Nievera (born 1962), Filipino singer
- Martin Nordqvist (born 2003), Swedish freestyle skier
- Martin Nürenbach (died 1780), German acrobat, stage actor, dancer and equilibrist

== O ==
- Martin Ødegaard (born 1998), Norwegian footballer
- Martin Offiah (born 1966), British rugby league footballer
- Martin O'Hagan (1950–2001), Irish journalist
- Martin O'Malley (born 1963), Mayor of Baltimore and Governor of Maryland
- Martin O'Neill (disambiguation)
- Martín García Óñez de Loyola (1549–1598), Spanish Basque soldier and Royal Governor of Chile

== P ==
- Martin Paasoja (born 1993), Estonian basketball player
- Martin Padar (born 1979), Estonian judoka
- Martin Parr (1952–2025), British documentary photographer, photojournalist and photobook collector
- Martin Patching (1958–2023), English footballer
- Martin Perscheid (1966–2021), German cartoonist
- Martin Petrov (born 1979), Bulgarian footballer
- Martin Plowman (born 1987), British racing driver
- Martin Prakkat, Indian film director and producer

== R ==
- Martin Reed (born 1978), English footballer
- Martin Reeves (born c. 1977), aka "Krafty Kuts", British musician
- Martin Reim (born 1971), Estonian football midfielder
- Martín Ríos (several people)
- Martin Ritt (1914-1990), American director, producer, and actor
- Martin Ritter (1872-1947), Chairman of the Liechtenstein Provisional Executive Committee
- Martin Roach (born 1962), Canadian actor
- Marty Robbins (1925–1982), American singer-songwriter
- Martín Rodríguez (disambiguation)
- Martin Romualdez (born 1963), Filipino businessman, lawyer and politician
- Martin Roy (born 1974), Canadian racing driver
- Martin Ryle (1918–1984), English radio astronomer

== S ==
- Martin W. Sandler (born 1933), American author, historian, and television producer
- Martín Sastre (born 1976), Uruguayan artist
- Martin Sayer (1987–2023), Hong Kong tennis player
- Martin Schanche (born 1945), Norwegian racing driver and politician
- Martin Scharlemann (born 1948), American mathematician
- Martin Schenkel (1968–2003), Swiss actor and musician
- Martin Scherber (1907–1974), German composer
- Martin Schörner (born 1986), German politician
- Martin Schulz (born 1955), German politician
- Martin Scorsese (born 1942), American filmmaker
- Martin Šebestyán (born 1973), Czech politician
- Martin Seidenberg (born 1973), German business executive
- Martin Seiferth (born 1990), German basketball player
- Martin Semmelrogge (born 1955), German actor
- Martin Sheen (born 1940), American actor
- Martin Shkreli (born 1983), American financial executive and convicted criminal
- Martin Short (born 1950), Canadian-American comedian
- Martin Šmilňák (born 1973), Slovak politician
- Martin Silva (born 1952), Canadian politician and radio personality
- Martin Sinner (born 1968), German tennis player
- Martin Škrtel (born 1984), Slovak football defender
- Martin Solveig (born 1976), French DJ and record producer
- Martin St. Louis (born 1975), Canadian ice hockey player
- Martin Steele (born 1962), British middle-distance runner
- Martin Strel (born 1954), Slovenian marathon swimmer
- Martin Johnsrud Sundby (born 1984), Norwegian cross-country skier

== T ==
- Martin Taupau (born 1990), New Zealand rugby league footballer
- Martin Teffer (born 1965), Dutch volleyball player and coach
- Martin Tešovič (born 1974), Slovak weightlifter
- Martin Thaler, Austrian skeleton racer
- Martin Tomczyk (born 1981), German racing driver
- Martin Truex Jr. (born 1980), American racing driver
- Martin Truex Sr. (1958–2025), American racing driver
- Martin Tungevaag (born 1993), Norwegian DJ

== V ==
- Martin Van Buren (1782–1862), 8th president of the United States
- Martin van der Horst (born 1965), Dutch volleyball player
- Martin van Drunen (born 1966), Dutch death metal vocalist/musician
- Martín Vassallo Argüello (born 1980), Argentine tennis player
- Martin Vengadesan (born 1973), Malaysian writer/musician
- Martin Venhart, Slovak nuclear physicist and President of the Slovak Academy of Sciences
- Martin Verkerk (born 1978), Dutch tennis player
- Martin Viiask (born 1983), Estonian basketball player
- Martin Vincentz (born 1986), German politician
- Martín Vizcarra (born 1963), Peruvian politician and President of Peru
- Martin Vunk (born 1984), Estonian football midfielder

== W ==
- Martin Walsh (film editor) (born 1955), Academy Award-winning film editor
- Martin Gottfried Weiss (1905–1946), SS Commander of German concentration camps executed for war crimes
- Martin Weston (born 1959), English cricketer
- Martin Winterkorn (born 1947), German automobile manager
- Martin Wickramasinghe, MBE (1890-1976), Sri Lankan Author and Journalist.

== Y ==
- Martin Yan (born 1948), Hong Kong-American chef and food writer

== Z ==
- Martin Zijlstra (1944–2014), Dutch politician

== Other uses ==
- Martin (2024 film)
- Martin (TV series)

== Fictional characters ==
- Martin, the title character of the 2024 Indian film Martin
- Martin, the title Character of the 1977 film Martin
- Martin Chuzzlewit, from the novel by Charles Dickens
- Martin Crane, from the American sitcom Frasier
- Martín Fierro, Argentine gaucho in epic of the same name
- Martin Fitzgerald, in the crime drama Without a Trace
- Martin Fowler, from the English soap opera EastEnders
- Marvin the Martian, in Looney Tunes cartoons:
  - Melvin the Martian, a character in the 2000s American animated television series Loonatics Unleashed, voiced by Joe Alaskey
- Martin Payne, title character from the American sitcom Martin
- Martin Stein, from DC Comics
- Captain Martin Walker, protagonist of Spec Ops: The Line
