= 1982 Detroit Lions season =

NFL team season

- Head coach: Monte Clark
- Offensive coordinator: Ted Marchibroda
- Defensive coordinator: Maxie Baughan
- Home stadium: Pontiac Silverdome

Results
- Record: 4–5
- Division place: 8th NFC (would have been 4th in the NFC Central)
- Playoffs: Lost Wild Card Playoffs (at Redskins) 7–31
- All-Pros: 1: DT Doug English (1st team)
- Pro Bowlers: 3: T Keith Dorney; RB Billy Sims; DT Doug English

The 1982 Detroit Lions season was the 53rd season in franchise history. An NFL players strike shortened the regular season to nine games.

The NFL changed the playoff format due to the strike to allow the top eight teams in each conference to qualify. Because of this, the Lions qualified for their first postseason appearance since 1970, becoming one of only four teams to ever qualify for the playoffs despite having a losing record. The Lions and the 1982 Cleveland Browns are the only two teams with a losing record to qualify as wildcards.

The Lions lost to the Washington Redskins at RFK Stadium in the first round of the playoffs.

It would not be until 2010 when the Seattle Seahawks became the third team with a losing record to qualify for the playoffs (7–9), the first to do so in a 16-game season and the first to win a division title with a losing record. The Carolina Panthers in 2014 (7–8–1) and Washington in 2020 (7–9) have subsequently won their divisions and made the postseason with losing records. After the season, Ken Callicutt retired.

== Offseason ==
=== NFL draft ===
Round	Pick	Player	Position	College
1	15	Jimmy Williams	LB	Nebraska
2	42	Bobby Watkins	CB	Southwest Texas State
3	69	Steve Doig	LB	New Hampshire
4	96	Bruce McNorton	CB	Georgetown (KY)
5	127	William Graham	S	Texas
6	154	Mike Machurek	QB	Idaho State
7	175	Phil Bates	RB	Nebraska
7	187	Victor Simmons	WR	Oregon State
8	208	Martin Moss	DE	UCLA
9	231	Dan Wagoner	DB	Kansas
10	266	Roosevelt Barnes	LB	Purdue
11	292	Edward Lee	WR	South Carolina State
12	319	Ricky Porter	RB	Slippery Rock
12	326	Rob Rubick	TE	Grand Valley State

== Roster ==
Detroit Lions roster
Quarterbacks: 16 Gary Danielson; 17 Eric Hipple; 14 Mike Machurek; Running backs: 24 Dexter Bussey; 31 Ken Callicutt; 32 Rick Kane; 25 Horace King; 20 Billy Sims; Wide receivers: 47 Edward Lee; 83 Robbie Martin; 89 Tracy Porter; 87 Freddie Scott; 39 Leonard Thompson; Tight ends: 81 David Hill; 80 Ulysses Norris; 84 Rob Rubick	Offensive linemen: 76 Karl Baldischwiler T; 73 Russ Bolinger G; 72 Chris Dieterich T; 70 Keith Dorney T; 61 Homer Elias G; 65 Amos Fowler C; 55 Tom Turnure C; 67 Don Greco G; 64 Larry Lee G/C; Defensive linemen: 60 Al Baker DE; 74 Joe Ehrmann DT; 78 Doug English DT; 79 William Gay DT; 62 Curtis Green DE; 63 Martin Moss DE/DT; 75 Dave Pureifory DE	Linebackers: 54 Roosevelt Barnes OLB; 53 Garry Cobb OLB; 58 Steve Doig MLB; 57 Ken Fantetti MLB; 51 James Harrell OLB; 50 Terry Tautolo OLB; 52 Stan White OLB; Defensive backs: 40 Billy Cesare FS; 33 William Graham SS; 26 Hector Gray SS; 35 Alvin Hall FS; 43 Al Latimer CB; 29 Bruce McNorton CB; 34 Dan Wagoner CB/S; 27 Bobby Watkins CB; Special teams: 3 Eddie Murray K; 1 Tom Skladany P	Reserve lists: 68 Tommie Ginn G (IR); 28 James Hunter CB (IR); 86 Mark Nichols WR (IR); 23 Ray Oldham S (IR); 38 Vince Thompson RB (IR); 59 Jimmy Williams LB (IR); rookies in italics

== Regular season ==
=== Schedule ===
Week	Date	Opponent	Result	Record	Venue	Attendance
1	September 12	**Chicago Bears**	**W** 17–10	1–0	Pontiac Silverdome	71,337
2	September 19	at Los Angeles Rams	**W** 19–14	2–0	Anaheim Stadium	59,470
Player strike cancels seven games
3	November 21	at **Chicago Bears**	**L** 17–20	2–1	Soldier Field	71,337
4	November 25	New York Giants	**L** 6–13	2–2	Pontiac Silverdome	64,348
5	December 6	New York Jets	**L** 13–28	2–3	Pontiac Silverdome	79,361
6	December 12	at **Green Bay Packers**	**W** 30–10	3–3	Lambeau Field	51,875
7	December 19	**Minnesota Vikings**	**L** 31–34	3–4	Pontiac Silverdome	73,058
8	December 26	at **Tampa Bay Buccaneers**	**L** 21–23	3–5	Tampa Stadium	65,997
9	January 2	**Green Bay Packers**	**W** 27–24	4–5	Pontiac Silverdome	64,377
Note: Intra-division opponents are in **bold** text.

== Standings ==
NFC Central
	W	L	T	PCT	DIV	CONF	PF	PA	STK
^{(3)} Green Bay Packers	5	3	1	.611	1–2	4–2	226	169	L1
^{(4)} Minnesota Vikings	5	4	0	.556	3–1	4–1	158	178	W3
^{(7)} Tampa Bay Buccaneers	5	4	0	.556	2–1	3–3	158	178	W1
^{(8)} Detroit Lions	4	5	0	.444	3–3	4–4	181	176	W1
Chicago Bears	3	6	0	.333	1–3	2–5	141	174	L1

NFC
#	Team	W	L	T	PCT	PF	PA	STK
**Seeded postseason qualifiers**
1	Washington Redskins	8	1	0	.889	190	128	W4
2	Dallas Cowboys	6	3	0	.667	226	145	L2
3	Green Bay Packers	5	3	1	.611	226	169	L1
4 (Note: Minnesota (4–1), Atlanta (4–3), St. Louis (5–4), Tampa Bay (3–3) seeds were determined by best won-lost record in conference games.)	Minnesota Vikings	5	4	0	.556	187	198	W1
5	Atlanta Falcons	5	4	0	.556	183	199	L2
6	St. Louis Cardinals	5	4	0	.556	135	170	L1
7	Tampa Bay Buccaneers	5	4	0	.556	158	178	W3
8 (Note: Detroit finished ahead of New Orleans and the N.Y. Giants based on best conference record (4–4 to Saints’ 3–5 to Giants’ 3–5).)	Detroit Lions	4	5	0	.444	181	176	W1
**Did not qualify for the postseason**
9	New Orleans Saints	4	5	0	.444	129	160	W1
10	New York Giants	4	5	0	.444	164	160	W1
11 (Note: San Francisco finished ahead of Chicago, and Chicago finished ahead of Philadelphia, based on conference record (49ers’ 2–3 to Bears’ 2–5 to Eagles’ 1–5).)	San Francisco 49ers	3	6	0	.333	209	206	L1
12	Chicago Bears	3	6	0	.333	141	174	L1
13	Philadelphia Eagles	3	6	0	.333	191	195	L1
14	Los Angeles Rams	2	7	0	.222	200	250	W1
**Tiebreakers**

== Season summary ==
=== Week 12 ===
Week Twelve: New York Giants (0–3) at Detroit Lions (2–1)

Quarter	1	2	3	4	Total
**Giants**	0	0	6	7	**13**
Lions	3	3	0	0	**6**

at Pontiac Silverdome, Pontiac, Michigan

- Date: November 25, 1982
- Game time: 12:00 p.m. EST
- Game weather: Indoors (dome)
- Referee: Tom Dooley
- TV announcers (CBS): Pat Summerall and John Madden
- Pro-Football-Reference.com

Game information

**First quarter**

- DET – Eddie Murray 46-yard field goal. Lions 3–0. Drive:

**Second quarter**

- DET – Eddie Murray 44-yard field goal. Lions 6–0. Drive:

**Third quarter**

- NYG – Joe Danelo 34-yard field goal. Lions 6–3. Drive:
- NYG – Joe Danelo 40-yard field goal. Tie 6–6. Drive:

**Fourth quarter**

- NYG – Lawrence Taylor 97-yard interception return (Joe Danelo kick). Giants 13–7.

Top passers

- NYG – Scott Brunner – 12/28, 136 yards, 2 INT
- DET – Gary Danielson – 12/19, 125 yards, 3 INT

Top rushers

- NYG – Butch Woolfolk – 21 rushes, 87 yards
- DET – Billy Sims – 26 rushes, 114 yards

Top receivers

- NYG – Johnny Perkins – 5 receptions, 80 yards
- DET – Mark Nichols – 3 receptions, 49 yards

== Playoffs ==
Quarter	1	2	3	4	Total
Lions	0	0	7	0	**7**
**Redskins**	10	14	7	0	**31**

at RFK Stadium, Washington, D.C.

- Game time: 12:30 p.m. EST
- Game weather: 46 °F or 7.8 °C, cloudy
- Game attendance: 55,045
- Referee: Tom Dooley
- TV announcers (CBS): Dick Stockton and Roger Staubach

The Redskins jumped to a 24–0 lead en route to a 31–7 victory over the Lions.

== Records ==
Regular-season record

- First team with a losing record (4–5, .444) to qualify for the playoffs. Shared with Cleveland Browns
- Worst regular-season record (4–5, .444) to qualify for the playoffs. Shared with Cleveland Browns. Broken by the 2010 Seattle Seahawks and later matched by the 2020 Washington Football Team (7–9, .438).
