= 1983 Detroit Lions season =

NFL team season

- Owner: William Clay Ford Sr.
- Head coach: Monte Clark
- Offensive coordinator: Ted Marchibroda
- Defensive coordinator: Ed Beard
- Home stadium: Pontiac Silverdome

Results
- Record: 9–7
- Division place: 1st NFC Central
- Playoffs: Lost Divisional Playoffs (at 49ers) 23–24
- All-Pros: DT Doug English (2nd team)
- Pro Bowlers: DT Doug English

The 1983 Detroit Lions season was the 54th season in franchise history. Despite a 1–4 start, the Lions rallied to finish with a 9–7 record. They were able to rise to the top of a weak NFC Central (three of the other four teams went 8–8, and Tampa Bay tied for the NFL's worst record at 2–14), to claim their first division championship since 1957, made the playoffs in a non-strike season for the first time since 1970, and they would make the playoffs in consecutive seasons for the first time since playing for the NFL championship in 1952, 1953 and 1954. The Lions would not return to the postseason for another eight years and not do so in consecutive seasons until doing it three straight years from 1993 to 1995.

The offense ranked 15th in the NFL in points scored, leaving the defense to carry the load. The Lions’ defense turned out to be the second-best in the league in points allowed, keyed defensive tackle Doug English and his 13 sacks. English was the team's only Pro Bowler, though he also got some help from defensive end William Gay, who registered 13½ sacks of his own. In the NFC playoffs, the Lions lead the San Francisco 49ers late into the fourth quarter, until Joe Montana drove the 49ers down the field for a 14-yard touchdown pass to Freddie Solomon to give the 49ers a 24–23 lead. The Lions would have a chance to win the game, as Gary Danielson drove them into field goal range, but placekicker Eddie Murray missed a 44-yard field goal with five seconds remaining.

== Offseason ==
=== NFL draft ===
Round	Pick	Player	Position	School
1	13	James Jones	FB	Florida
2	40	Rich Strenger	OT	Michigan
3	67	Mike Cofer	LB	Tennessee
4	94	August Curley	LB	USC
5	115	Demetrious Johnson	S	Missouri
5	121	Steve Mott	C	Alabama
6	154	Todd Brown	WR	Nebraska
7	181	Mike Black	P	Arizona State
8	208	Bill Stapleton	DB	Washington
10	261	Dave Laube	G	Penn State
11	287	Ben Tate	RB	North Carolina Central
12	321	Jim Lane	C	Idaho State

== Roster ==
1983 Detroit Lions roster
Quarterbacks (QB): 16 Gary Danielson; 17 Eric Hipple; 14 Mike Machurek; Running backs (RB): 24 Dexter Bussey; 31 Ken Jenkins; 30 James Jones; 32 Rick Kane; 25 Horace King; 20 Billy Sims; 38 Vince Thompson; Wide receivers (WR): 89 Jeff Chadwick; 83 Robbie Martin; 86 Mark Nichols; 87 Freddie Scott; 39 Leonard Thompson; Tight ends (TE): 81 Reese McCall; 80 Ulysses Norris; 84 Rob Rubick	Offensive linemen (OL): 72 Chris Dieterich T; 70 Keith Dorney T; 61 Homer Elias G; 65 Amos Fowler C; 67 Don Greco G; 64 Larry Lee G; 52 Steve Mott C; 71 Rich Strenger T; 55 Tom Turnure C; Defensive linemen (DL): 66 Mike Cofer DE; 73 Mike Dawson DT; 78 Doug English DT; 74 Mike Fanning DT; 79 William Gay DE/DT; 62 Curtis Green DE; 63 Martin Moss DE/DT	Linebackers (LB): 54 Roosevelt Barnes OLB; 53 Garry Cobb OLB; 58 Steve Doig MLB; 57 Ken Fantetti MLB; 51 James Harrell OLB; 59 Jimmy Williams OLB; Defensive backs (DB): 33 William Graham SS; 35 Alvin Hall FS; 23 Maurice Harvey FS; 21 Demetrious Johnson SS; 29 Bruce McNorton CB; 34 Dan Wagoner CB; 27 Bobby Watkins CB; Special teams (ST): 11 Mike Black P; 3 Eddie Murray K	Reserve: 41 James Caver WR (IR); 50 August Curley LB (IR); 43 Al Latimer CB (IR); 82 Edward Lee WR (IR); Rookies in italics 49 active, 4 reserve

== Regular season ==
=== Schedule ===
Week	Date	Opponent	Result	Record	Attendance
1	September 4	at **Tampa Bay Buccaneers**	**W** 11–0	1–0	62,154
2	September 11	Cleveland Browns	**L** 31–26	1–1	60,095
3	September 18	Atlanta Falcons	**L** 30–14	1–2	54,622
4	September 25	at **Minnesota Vikings**	**L** 20–17	1–3	58,254
5	October 2	at Los Angeles Rams	**L** 21–10	1–4	49,403
6	October 9	**Green Bay Packers**	**W** 38–14	2–4	67,738
7	October 16	**Chicago Bears**	**W** 31–17	3–4	66,709
8	October 23	at Washington Redskins	**L** 38–17	3–5	43,189
9	October 30	at **Chicago Bears**	**W** 38–17	4–5	58,764
10	November 7	New York Giants	**W** 15–9	5–5	68,985
11	November 13	at Houston Oilers	**L** 27–17	5–6	40,660
12	November 20	at **Green Bay Packers**	**W** 23–20_{(OT)}	6–6	50,050
13	November 24	Pittsburgh Steelers	**W** 45–3	7–6	77,724
14	December 5	**Minnesota Vikings**	**W** 13–2	8–6	79,169
15	December 11	at Cincinnati Bengals	**L** 17–9	8–7	45,728
16	December 18	**Tampa Bay Buccaneers**	**W** 23–20	9–7	78,392
Note: Intra-divisional opponents are in **bold** text.

=== Game summaries ===
==== Week 1 ====
Team	1	2	3	4	Total
• Lions	5	0	3	3	11
Buccaneers	0	0	0	0	0

- Date: September 4
- Location: Tampa Stadium, Tampa, Florida
- Game start: 1:00 p.m.
- Game attendance: 62,154
- Game weather: 82 °F or 27.8 °C, wind 7 miles per hour (11 km/h; 6.1 kn)
- Referee: Gordon McCarter
- Television network: CBS

Scoring summary
Q1	DET	Safety, Jerry Golsteyn tackled by Doug English in end zone	DET 2–0
Q1	DET	Eddie Murray 29 yard field goal	DET 5–0
Q3	DET	Eddie Murray 48 yard field goal	DET 8–0
Q4	DET	Eddie Murray 38 yard field goal	DET 11–0

==== Week 11 at Oilers ====
Week Eleven: Detroit Lions (5–5) at Houston Oilers (0–10)

Quarter	1	2	3	4	Total
Lions	0	10	7	0	**17**
**Oilers**	3	7	14	3	**27**

at Houston Astrodome, Houston, Texas

- Date: November 13, 1983
- Game time: 1:00 p.m.
- Game weather: Indoors (dome)
- Game attendance: 40,660
- Referee: Bob Frederic
- Box Score, Box Score

Billy Sims, rather than be tackled during a rushing attempt, ran at, jumped, and, while fully airborne, kicked Oilers cornerback Steve Brown in the head.

Team	Category	Player	Statistics
Lions	Passing	Eric Hipple	17/29, 213 Yds, 3 INT
Lions	Rushing	Billy Sims	20 Rush, 105 Yds, TD
Lions	Receiving	Billy Sims	9 Rec, 90 Yds
Oilers	Passing	Oliver Luck	18/26, 189 Yds, 2 TD, INT
Oilers	Rushing	Earl Campbell	28 Rush, 107 Yds
Oilers	Receiving	Mike Renfro	7 Rec, 75 Yds

Scoring summary

Quarter	Time	Drive			Team	Scoring information	Score	
Quarter	Time	Plays	Yards	TOP	Team	Scoring information	DET	HOU
1	8:02				Oilers	47-yard field goal by Florian Kempf	0	3
2	12:48				Lions	Billy Sims 1-yard touchdown run, Eddie Murray kick good	7	3
2	3:48				Lions	35-yard field goal by Eddie Murray	10	3
2	0:50				Oilers	Mike McCloskey 13-yard touchdown reception from Oliver Luck, Florian Kempf kick good	10	10
3	10:25				Lions	James Jones 3-yard touchdown reception from Gary Danielson, Eddie Murray kick good	17	10
3	9:12				Oilers	Chris Dressel 13-yard touchdown reception from Oliver Luck, Florian Kempf kick good	17	17
3	1:01				Oilers	Larry Moriarty 4-yard touchdown run, Florian Kempf kick good	17	24
4	13:08				Oilers	21-yard field goal by Florian Kempf	17	27
"TOP" = time of possession. For other American football terms, see Glossary of American football.							17	27

=== Standings ===
NFC Central
	W	L	T	PCT	DIV	CONF	PF	PA	STK
Detroit Lions^{(3)}	9	7	0	.563	7–1	8–4	347	286	W1
Green Bay Packers	8	8	0	.500	4–4	6–6	429	439	L1
Chicago Bears	8	8	0	.500	4–4	7–7	311	301	W2
Minnesota Vikings	8	8	0	.500	4–4	4–8	316	348	W1
Tampa Bay Buccaneers	2	14	0	.125	1–7	1–11	241	380	L3

=== Postseason ===
NFC Divisional Playoff, San Francisco 49ers 24, Detroit Lions 23

Quarter	1	2	3	4	Total
Lions	3	6	0	14	**23**
**49ers**	7	7	3	7	**24**

at Candlestick Park, San Francisco

- Game time: 4:00 p.m. EST/1:00 p.m. PST
- Game weather: 59 °F or 15 °C, sunny
- Game attendance: 59,286
- Referee: Pat Haggerty
- TV announcers (CBS): Frank Glieber and Dick Vermeil
