= Martin Moss =

Martin Moss may refer to:

- Martin Moss (businessman), British managing director of London department store Woollands
- Martin Moss (American football), American football defensive end
