= List of Detroit Lions seasons =

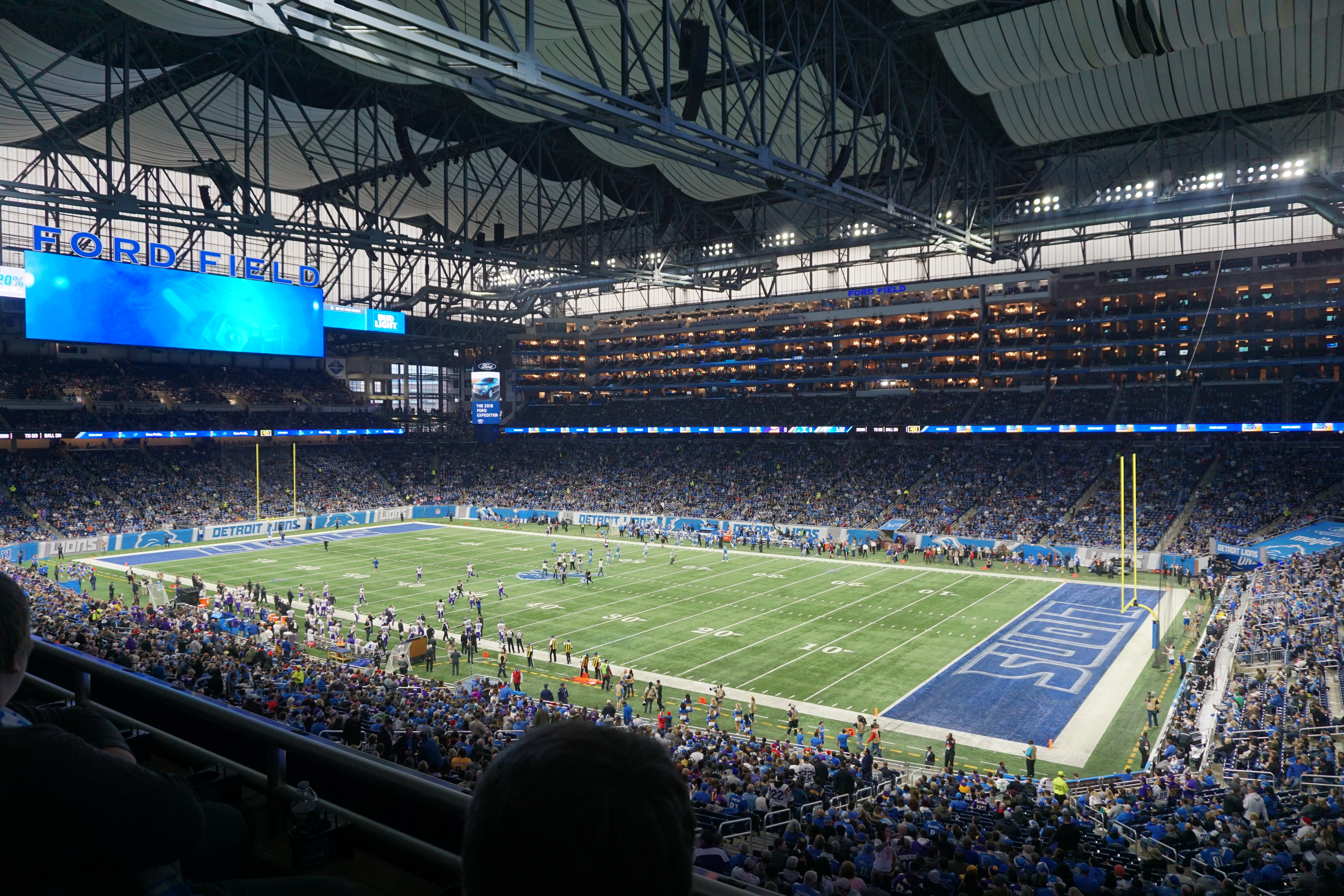
The Detroit Lions have played their home games at Ford Field since 2002.

The Detroit Lions are a professional American football team based in Detroit, Michigan. The Lions compete in the National Football League (NFL) as a member of the National Football Conference (NFC) North Division. The franchise was founded in Portsmouth, Ohio, as the Portsmouth Spartans in 1928 and joined the NFL on July 12, 1930. After being purchased by George A. Richards in 1934, the franchise was relocated to Detroit and renamed to the Detroit Lions in reference to the city's Major League Baseball (MLB) franchise, the Detroit Tigers. The team plays its home games at Ford Field in Downtown Detroit.

The Lions have won four NFL championships, all of which pre-date the existence of the Super Bowl. The Lions' four championships are tied for the tenth most total championships amongst all 32 NFL franchises; the last of these was in 1957, which gives the club the second-longest NFL championship drought behind the Arizona Cardinals. They are one of four current teams, and the only one in the NFC, to have never played in the Super Bowl. Two of these teams, the Jacksonville Jaguars and the Houston Texans, are expansion teams in the AFC that began play in 1995 and 2002 respectively. Additionally, the Lions have won only three post-season games since 1957. The Lions also lost an NFL-record nine consecutive playoff games from 1991 to 2023.

As of the end of the 2024 regular season, the Lions have an all-time record of 606 wins, 709 losses, and 34 ties in the regular season, with an additional 9 wins and 14 losses in the playoffs. The team has had 40 winning seasons, 49 losing seasons, and 6 seasons with as many wins as losses. The Lions were the first franchise to finish a full (non-strike shortened) regular season with no wins or ties, since the move to sixteen regular season games in 1978, going 0–16 during the 2008 NFL season.

== Seasons ==
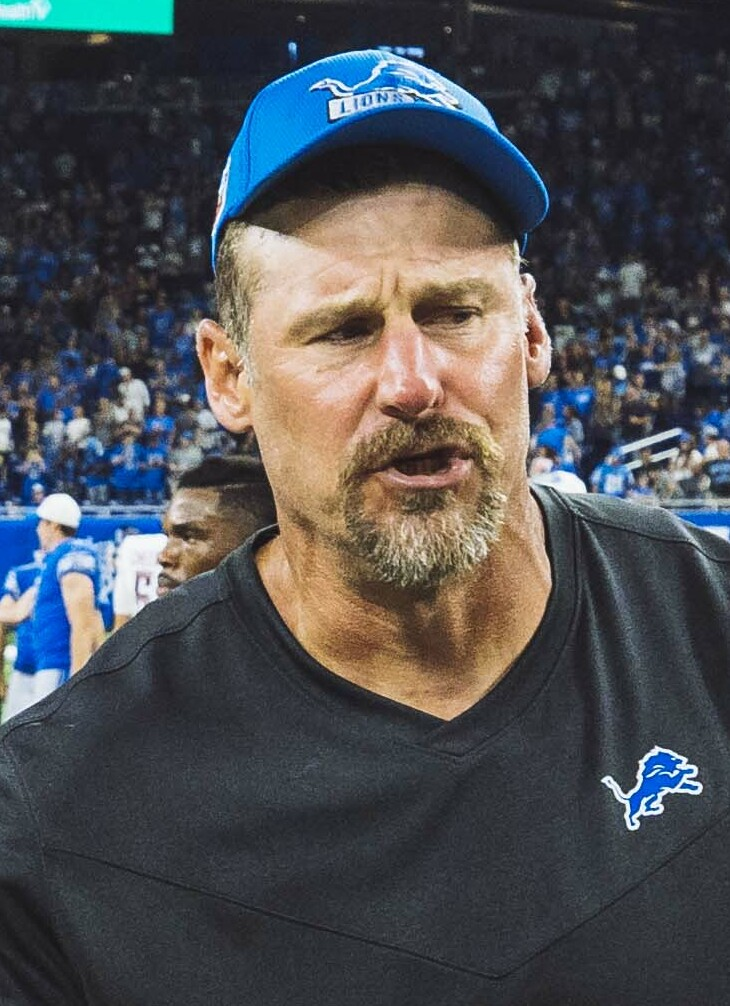
Lions head coach Dan Campbell played for the team during the 2006–2008 seasons and has been their head coach since 2021.

Legend
^{(#)}	The order of league championship won by the franchise
Finish	Final position in league, division, or conference
T-#	Finished tied in that position with one or more teams
Pct	The team's winning percentage for the season
^{†}	NFL champions (1920–1969)
^{‡}	Super Bowl champions (1970–present)
^{*}	Conference champions
^{^}	Division champions
^{§}	Wild Card berth
^{°}	One-game playoff berth

Detroit Lions record by season
Season	Team	League	Conference	Division	Regular season					Postseason results	Awards	Head coach	Refs
Season	Team	League	Conference	Division	Finish	W	L	T	Pct	Postseason results	Awards	Head coach	Refs
Portsmouth Spartans
1928	1928	None				9	3	2	.714			Walt Jean	
1929	1929	None				12	2	1	.833			Walt Jean	
1930	1930	NFL			8th	5	6	3	.464	The NFL did not hold playoff games until 1932		Hal Griffen	
1931	1931	NFL			2nd	11	3	0	.786	The NFL did not hold playoff games until 1932		George "Potsy" Clark	
1932	1932	NFL			3rd° (Note: Finished tied for first (by winning percentage) at 6–1–4; lost tiebreaker playoff game to the Bears, which dropped them to 3rd place (by winning percentage). The tiebreaker game was considered a regular season game, so 3rd place at 6–2–4 is the Spartans' final standing.)	6	2	4	.667	Lost Playoff Game (at Bears) 0–9		George "Potsy" Clark	
1933	1933	NFL		Western (Note: Prior to 1933, the NFL determined their league champions based on win–loss percentage. After a tie for first place in 1932, the NFL arranged an extra regular season game to determine the season's champion. Based on the success of this matchup, George Preston Marshall and George Halas put forth a proposal to determine the league's champion in a championship match at the end of each season. In 1933, the NFL divided teams into two divisions, with the division champions set to meet in the NFL Championship Game.)	2nd	6	5	0	.545			George "Potsy" Clark	
Detroit Lions
1934	1934	NFL		Western	2nd	10	3	0	.769			George "Potsy" Clark	
1935	1935	NFL^{†}		Western^{^}	1st^{^}	7	3	2	.667	Won NFL Championship ^{(1)} (Giants) 26–7		George "Potsy" Clark	(Note: In 1935, the NFL set the number of regular season games to 12. Prior to that, the NFL did not have a set number of games for teams to play.)
1936	1936	NFL		Western	3rd	8	4	0	.667			George "Potsy" Clark	
1937	1937	NFL		Western	T–2nd	7	4	0	.636			Dutch Clark	(Note: In 1937, the NFL lowered the number of regular season games, which had been 12 games since 1935, to 11.)
1938	1938	NFL		Western	2nd	7	4	0	.636			Dutch Clark	
1939	1939	NFL		Western	3rd	6	5	0	.545			Gus Henderson	
1940	1940	NFL		Western	3rd	5	5	1	.500			George "Potsy" Clark	
1941	1941	NFL		Western	3rd	4	6	1	.409			Bill Edwards	
1942	1942	NFL		Western	5th	0	11	0	.000			Bill Edwards (0–3) John Karcis (0–8)	
1943	1943	NFL		Western	3rd	3	6	1	.350			Gus Dorais	(Note: In 1943, the NFL again lowered the number of regular season games, which had been 11 games since 1937, to 10.)
1944	1944	NFL		Western	T–2nd	6	3	1	.650		Frank Sinkwich (MVP)	Gus Dorais	
1945	1945	NFL		Western	2nd	7	3	0	.700			Gus Dorais	
1946	1946	NFL		Western	5th	1	10	0	.091			Gus Dorais	(Note: In 1946, the NFL expanded its regular season schedule, which had been 10 games since 1943, to 11 games.)
1947	1947	NFL		Western	5th	3	9	0	.250			Gus Dorais	(Note: In 1947, the NFL expanded its regular season schedule, which had been 11 games since 1946, to 12 games.)
1948	1948	NFL		Western	5th	2	10	0	.167			Bo McMillin	
1949	1949	NFL		Western	4th	4	8	0	.333			Bo McMillin	
1950	1950	NFL	National (Note: In 1950, the NFL merged with the All-America Football Conference (AAFC) to become the "National-American Football League". Teams were no longer part of divisions, instead being placed into the newly created National and American conferences. The NFL reverted the name change roughly three months later.)		4th	6	6	0	.500			Bo McMillin	
1951	1951	NFL	National		T–2nd	7	4	1	.625			Buddy Parker	
1952	1952	NFL^{†}	National^{*}		T–1st°	9	3	0	.750	Won Conference Playoff (Rams) 31–21; Won NFL Championship ^{(2)} (at Browns) 17–7		Buddy Parker	
1953	1953	NFL^{†}	Western^{*} (Note: In 1953, the NFL renamed the American conference to the Eastern conference and the National conference to the Western conference. No teams changed conferences as a result of this.)		1st^{*}	10	2	0	.833	Won NFL Championship ^{(3)} (Browns) 17–16		Buddy Parker	
1954	1954	NFL	Western^{*}		1st^{*}	9	2	1	.792	Lost NFL Championship (at Browns) 10–56		Buddy Parker	
1955	1955	NFL	Western		6th	3	9	0	.250			Buddy Parker	
1956	1956	NFL	Western		2nd	9	3	0	.750			Buddy Parker	
1957	1957	NFL^{†}	Western^{*}		1st^{*}	8	4	0	.667	Won Conference Playoff (at 49ers) 31–27; Won NFL Championship ^{(4)} (Browns) 59–14	George Wilson (COY)	George Wilson	
1958	1958	NFL	Western		5th	4	7	1	.375			George Wilson	
1959	1959	NFL	Western		5th	3	8	1	.292			George Wilson	
1960	1960	NFL	Western		T–2nd^{°}	7	5	0	.583	Won Playoff Bowl (Note: The Playoff Bowl (played between 1960–1969) was a post-season exhibition game to determine third place.) (vs. Browns) 17–16		George Wilson	
1961	1961	NFL	Western		2nd^{°}	8	5	1	.607	Won Playoff Bowl (vs. Eagles) 38–10		George Wilson	(Note: In 1961, the NFL expanded its regular season schedule, which had been 12 games since 1947, to 14 games.)
1962	1962	NFL	Western		2nd^{°}	11	3	0	.786	Won Playoff Bowl (vs. Steelers) 17–10		George Wilson	
1963	1963	NFL	Western		T–4th	5	8	1	.393			George Wilson	
1964	1964	NFL	Western		4th	7	5	2	.571			George Wilson	
1965	1965	NFL	Western		6th	6	7	1	.464			Harry Gilmer	
1966	1966	NFL	Western		T–6th	4	9	1	.321			Harry Gilmer	
1967	1967	NFL	Western	Central (Note: In 1967, the NFL realigned teams from the existing two conferences into newly created divisions. The Eastern conference contained the Capitol and Century divisions while the Western conference contained the Central and Coastal divisions.)	3rd	5	7	2	.429		Lem Barney (DROY) Mel Farr (OROY)	Joe Schmidt	
1968	1968	NFL	Western	Central	4th	4	8	2	.357		Earl McCullouch (OROY)	Joe Schmidt	
1969	1969	NFL	Western	Central	2nd	9	4	1	.679			Joe Schmidt	
1970	1970	NFL	NFC (Note: In 1970, the NFL and American Football League (AFL) officially merged in the AFL–NFL merger to form one league with two conferences. All ten former AFL teams as well as Pittsburgh, Cleveland, and Baltimore from the pre-merger NFL joined the AFC; the other thirteen remaining NFL teams joined the NFC. Each of those two were divided into three divisions: East, Central, and West.)	Central	2nd^{§}	10	4	0	.714	Lost Divisional Playoffs (at Cowboys) 0–5		Joe Schmidt	
1971	1971	NFL	NFC	Central	2nd	7	6	1	.536			Joe Schmidt	
1972	1972	NFL	NFC	Central	2nd	8	5	1	.607			Joe Schmidt	
1973	1973	NFL	NFC	Central	2nd	6	7	1	.464			Don McCafferty	
1974	1974	NFL	NFC	Central	2nd	7	7	0	.500			Rick Forzano	
1975	1975	NFL	NFC	Central	2nd	7	7	0	.500			Rick Forzano	
1976	1976	NFL	NFC	Central	3rd	6	8	0	.429		Greg Landry (CBPOY)	Rick Forzano (1–3) Tommy Hudspeth (5–5)	
1977	1977	NFL	NFC	Central	3rd	6	8	0	.429			Tommy Hudspeth	
1978	1978	NFL	NFC	Central	3rd	7	9	0	.438		Al Baker (DROY)	Monte Clark	(Note: In 1978, the NFL expanded its regular season schedule, which had been 14 games since 1961, to 16 games.)
1979	1979	NFL	NFC	Central	5th	2	14	0	.125			Monte Clark	
1980	1980	NFL	NFC	Central	2nd	9	7	0	.563		Billy Sims (OROY)	Monte Clark	
1981	1981	NFL	NFC	Central	2nd	8	8	0	.500			Monte Clark	
1982	1982	NFL	NFC	None (Note: The 1982 season was shortened to nine games after a players' strike. The top eight teams in each conference advanced to the playoffs.)	8th^{§}	4	5	0	.444	Lost First Round Playoffs (at Redskins) 7–31		Monte Clark	
1983	1983	NFL	NFC	Central^{^}	1st^{^}	9	7	0	.563	Lost Divisional Playoffs (at 49ers) 23–24		Monte Clark	
1984	1984	NFL	NFC	Central	4th	4	11	1	.281			Monte Clark	
1985	1985	NFL	NFC	Central	4th	7	9	0	.438			Darryl Rogers	
1986	1986	NFL	NFC	Central	3rd	5	11	0	.313			Darryl Rogers	
1987	1987	NFL	NFC	Central	5th	4	11	0	.267			Darryl Rogers	(Note: The 1987 NFL strike caused the schedule to be reduced to 15 games.)
1988	1988	NFL	NFC	Central	4th	4	12	0	.250			Darryl Rogers (2–9) Wayne Fontes (2–3)	
1989	1989	NFL	NFC	Central	3rd	7	9	0	.438		Barry Sanders (OROY)	Wayne Fontes	
1990	1990	NFL	NFC	Central	3rd	6	10	0	.375			Wayne Fontes	
1991	1991	NFL	NFC	Central^{^}	1st^{^}	12	4	0	.750	Won Divisional Playoffs (Cowboys) 38–6; Lost NFC Championship (at Redskins) 10–41	Wayne Fontes (COY)	Wayne Fontes	
1992	1992	NFL	NFC	Central	5th	5	11	0	.313			Wayne Fontes	
1993	1993	NFL	NFC	Central^{^}	1st^{^}	10	6	0	.625	Lost Wild Card Playoffs (Packers) 24–28		Wayne Fontes	
1994	1994	NFL	NFC	Central	3rd^{§}	9	7	0	.563	Lost Wild Card Playoffs (at Packers) 12–16	Barry Sanders (OPOY)	Wayne Fontes	
1995	1995	NFL	NFC	Central	2nd^{§}	10	6	0	.625	Lost Wild Card Playoffs (at Eagles) 37–58		Wayne Fontes	
1996	1996	NFL	NFC	Central	5th	5	11	0	.313			Wayne Fontes	
1997	1997	NFL	NFC	Central	3rd^{§}	9	7	0	.563	Lost Wild Card Playoffs (at Buccaneers) 10–20	Barry Sanders (MVP, OPOY)	Bobby Ross	
1998	1998	NFL	NFC	Central	4th	5	11	0	.313			Bobby Ross	
1999	1999	NFL	NFC	Central	3rd^{§}	8	8	0	.500	Lost Wild Card Playoffs (at Redskins) 13–27		Bobby Ross	
2000	2000	NFL	NFC	Central	4th	9	7	0	.563			Bobby Ross (5–4) Gary Moeller (4–3)	
2001	2001	NFL	NFC	Central	5th	2	14	0	.125			Marty Mornhinweg	
2002	2002	NFL	NFC	North (Note: In 2002, the NFL realigned to create four divisions in both conferences with four teams in each division.)	4th	3	13	0	.188			Marty Mornhinweg	
2003	2003	NFL	NFC	North	4th	5	11	0	.313			Steve Mariucci	
2004	2004	NFL	NFC	North	3rd	6	10	0	.375			Steve Mariucci	
2005	2005	NFL	NFC	North	3rd	5	11	0	.313			Steve Mariucci (4–7) Dick Jauron (1–4)	
2006	2006	NFL	NFC	North	4th	3	13	0	.188			Rod Marinelli	
2007	2007	NFL	NFC	North	3rd	7	9	0	.438			Rod Marinelli	
2008	2008	NFL	NFC	North	4th	0	16	0	.000			Rod Marinelli	
2009	2009	NFL	NFC	North	4th	2	14	0	.125			Jim Schwartz	
2010	2010	NFL	NFC	North	3rd	6	10	0	.375		Ndamukong Suh (DROY)	Jim Schwartz	
2011	2011	NFL	NFC	North	2nd^{§}	10	6	0	.625	Lost Wild Card Playoffs (at Saints) 28–45	Matthew Stafford (CBPOY)	Jim Schwartz	
2012	2012	NFL	NFC	North	4th	4	12	0	.250			Jim Schwartz	
2013	2013	NFL	NFC	North	3rd	7	9	0	.438			Jim Schwartz	
2014	2014	NFL	NFC	North	2nd^{§}	11	5	0	.688	Lost Wild Card Playoffs (at Cowboys) 20–24		Jim Caldwell	
2015	2015	NFL	NFC	North	3rd	7	9	0	.438			Jim Caldwell	
2016	2016	NFL	NFC	North	2nd^{§}	9	7	0	.563	Lost Wild Card Playoffs (at Seahawks) 6–26		Jim Caldwell	
2017	2017	NFL	NFC	North	2nd	9	7	0	.563			Jim Caldwell	
2018	2018	NFL	NFC	North	4th	6	10	0	.375			Matt Patricia	
2019	2019	NFL	NFC	North	4th	3	12	1	.219			Matt Patricia	
2020	2020	NFL	NFC	North	4th	5	11	0	.313			Matt Patricia (4–7) Darrell Bevell (1–4)	
2021	2021	NFL	NFC	North	4th	3	13	1	.206			Dan Campbell	(Note: In 2021, the NFL expanded its regular season schedule, which had been 16 games since 1978, to 17 games.)
2022	2022	NFL	NFC	North	2nd	9	8	0	.529			Dan Campbell	
2023	2023	NFL	NFC	North^{^}	1st^{^}	12	5	0	.706	Won Wild Card Playoffs (Rams) 24–23; Won Divisional Playoffs (Buccaneers) 31–23; Lost NFC Championship (at 49ers) 31–34	Brad Holmes (EOY)	Dan Campbell	
2024	2024	NFL	NFC	North^{^}	1st^{^}	15	2	0	.882	Lost Divisional Playoffs (Commanders) 31–45	Brad Holmes (EOY)	Dan Campbell	
2025	2025	NFL	NFC	North	4th	9	8	0	.529			Dan Campbell	
Totals						615	717	34	.463	All-time NFL regular season record (1930–2025)			
Totals						9	15	—	.375	All-time NFL postseason record (1930–2025)			
Totals						624	732	34	.461	All-time NFL regular & postseason record (1930–2025)			

== See also ==
- History of the Detroit Lions
- List of Detroit Lions first-round draft picks
- List of Detroit Lions head coaches
