= Mittag =

Mittag is a surname. Notable people with the surname include:

- Anja Mittag (born 1985), German footballer
- Gösta Mittag-Leffler (1846–1927), Swedish mathematician
- Günter Mittag (1926–1994), German economist
- Martin Mittag (born 1982), German politician
- Susanne Mittag (born 1958), German politician
