= Bruce McNorton =

American football player (born 1959)

No. 29
- Position: Cornerback

Personal information
- Born: February 28, 1959 (age 67); Daytona Beach, Florida, U.S.
- Listed height: 5 ft 11 in (1.80 m)
- Listed weight: 175 lb (79 kg)

Career information
- High school: Spruce Creek (Port Orange, Florida)
- College: Georgetown (KY) (1978–1981)
- NFL draft: 1982: 4th round, 94th overall pick

Career history
- Detroit Lions (1982–1990); Miami Dolphins (1991)

Career NFL statistics
- Interceptions: 20
- Fumble recoveries: 6
- Sacks: 1
- Stats at Pro Football Reference

Bruce Edward McNorton (born February 28, 1959) is an American former professional football player who played cornerback for the Detroit Lions of the National Football League (NFL). He played college football at Georgetown College from 1978 to 1981.

== Early life and college ==
Bruce was born in Daytona Beach, Florida on February 28, 1959. Bruce attended high school at Spruce Creek High School in Port Orange, Florida. While there, he was an All-State football player.

Bruce was offered a football scholarship by one college – Georgetown College in Georgetown, Kentucky, an NAIA program. He spent 4 years at Georgetown, from 1978–1981, and still holds the records for kick return average and touchdowns in a season, both set in 1981. He has the most kickoff return yards in program history and is tied for the most kick return touchdowns. He is 2nd in interceptions with 17. He was named a Little All-American in 1981. After his senior season, he played in the Senior Bowl in Birmingham, Alabama. He graduated from Georgetown with a degree in Social Work in December 1981.

Bruce was inducted into the Georgetown College Athletic Hall of Fame in 2000 and the Kentucky Pro Football Hall of Fame in 2008.

== Detroit Lions ==
=== 1982 ===
Bruce was drafted by the Detroit Lions with the 96th overall pick in the 4th round of the 1982 NFL draft. Bruce was the first player drafted out of Georgetown College. He saw action in only 4 games his rookie season due to a hand injury that occurred in training camp. Bruce was on Injured Reserve until December 11. The Lions made the playoffs in 1982 with a record of 4–5. The season was shortened from 16 games to 9 due to a players strike after Week 2. Bruce played in the playoff game against the Washington Redskins on January 8, 1983. The Redskins won the game, 31–7, and eventually won Super Bowl XVII against the Miami Dolphins.

=== 1983 ===
Bruce had a breakout season in 1983, playing all 16 games and winning the starting position over Al Latimer in week 9 against the Chicago Bears. Bruce intercepted his first pass that week, and gathered 6 more the rest of the season, including 2 each against the New York Giants and Pittsburgh Steelers. He tied for 4th among NFC defenders in interceptions for the year. Bruce helped lead the Lions to the Central Division crown in 1983, with a 9–7 record. On December 31, 1983, the Lions were defeated in the NFC Divisional Round by the San Francisco 49ers 24–23. It would be the last playoff game that Bruce would play in the NFL.

=== 1984 ===
Bruce started all 16 games at right cornerback for the Lions in 1984, intercepting 2 passes and leading the team in passes defended with 8. Bruce was 8th on the team in tackles with 79. The Lions slumped in 1984, going 4–11–1, ahead of only the Minnesota Vikings in the Central Division.

=== 1985 ===
Bruce again started all 16 games for the Lions, who finished the season tied with Minnesota for 3rd place in the division at 7–9. He intercepted 2 passes in 1985, with 76 tackles.

=== 1986 ===
Bruce started every game for the third season in a row for the Lions, recording 65 tackles. His 4 interceptions were good enough for 2nd on the Lions. He posted his career-high in passes defended with 17. Bruce was a catalyst on the field, as he led the team in minutes played. In a win over the Houston Oilers, he intercepted a pass from Warren Moon on their final drive to seal the victory.

=== 1987 ===
Because of the owner’s lockout, Bruce’s streak of consecutive starts ended at 58. However, he started all 12 games he played in. He intercepted 3 passes for 20 yards in the season. His biggest game of the year was against the Kansas City Chiefs in Week 12. He recorded 11 tackles and a key interception in the 4th quarter. Despite his excellent game, the Chiefs triumphed over the Lions 27–20. The Lions were one of the worst teams in the NFL in 1987, finishing tied for last place in the division with a 4–11 record.

=== 1988 ===
Bruce recorded the largest tackles total of his career in 1988, with 105 total tackles, 87 of them solo. His career high was set in Week 10 against Minnesota, with 13 tackles. Once again, he started all 16 games on the season. This would be the last season he would accomplish this feat. Bruce had one interception on the year, in a Week 14 win against Green Bay. The Lions had a worse season despite his efforts, finishing the season at 4–12 in a tie with Green Bay for last place in the Central Division.

=== 1989 ===
Bruce played in 8 games in 1989, losing his starting role to Terry Tyler. In Week 4 against Pittsburgh, Bruce sacked Bubby Brister to record the only sack of his career. Bruce suffered a knee injury in practice after week 8, ending his season. He recorded 4 tackles and 2 passes defended, with no interceptions. With the addition of 1988 Heisman Trophy winner Barry Sanders, the Lions improved to 7–9 in 1989, but it wasn’t enough to make the playoffs.

=== 1990 ===
Bruce played in 12 games in 1990, with 8 starts. Terry Tyler resumed his starting role for the first two weeks of the season, with Bruce taking over from Weeks 3 to 10. Bruce had 10 tackles against Kansas City in Week 6. He lost the starting position to Ray Crockett against the Denver Broncos in Week 11. He was injured against the Chicago Bears the following week and placed on IR on December 7 for the last 4 games. He finished the season with 56 tackles and a 33-yard interception. Bruce received the Ed Block Courage Award at the end of the season. He was granted free agency on February 1, 1991.

== Miami Dolphins ==
Bruce signed with the Miami Dolphins on July 11, 1991. He was waived on July 20, and recalled 2 days later to be placed on Injured Reserve. He would remain on IR for the season. Bruce was placed on the unprotected list on February 1, 1992. On April 24, the Dolphins did not make a qualifying offer to Bruce, making him an unrestricted free agent.

=== Regular season ===
Year	Team	Games		Tackles				Interceptions						Fumbles			
Year	Team	GP	GS	Cmb	Solo	Ast	Sck	PD	Int	Yds	Avg	Lng	TD	FF	FR	Yds	TD
1982	DET	4	0	6	2	4	0.0	0	0	0	0.0	0	0	0	0	0	0
1983	DET	16	8	74	59	15	0.0	11	7	30	4.3	15	0	0	0	0	0
1984	DET	16	16	79	54	25	0.0	8	2	0	0.0	0	0	0	0	0	0
1985	DET	16	16	76	63	13	0.0	8	2	14	7.0	10	0	0	0	0	0
1986	DET	16	16	65	52	13	0.0	17	4	10	2.5	10	0	1	2	0	0
1987	DET	12	12	64	53	11	0.0	4	3	20	6.7	20	0	2	0	0	0
1988	DET	16	16	105	87	18	0.0	9	1	4	4.0	4	0	3	4	36	0
1989	DET	8	0	4	3	1	1.0	2	0	0	0.0	0	0	0	0	0	0
1990	DET	12	8	56	49	7	0.0	10	1	33	33.0	33	0	0	0	0	0
Career		116	92	528	422	106	1.0	69	20	111	5.6	33	0	6	6	36	0

== Post-playing career ==
After his playing career concluded, Bruce coached at Pontiac Northern High School, first as an assistant under coach Jon Brown, then became head coach from 1995–99. Bruce was also a guidance counselor at the school. In 2000, Bruce was hired by the Pittsburgh Steelers as a scout. He scouted for the Steelers until 2022. Bruce regularly covered the South region, especially the Daytona Beach area.

== Personal ==
Bruce has 3 children, Mykeisha, Brittany, whose husband is Calvin Johnson, a member of the Pro Football Hall of Fame, and Bruce, Jr. who also scouted in the NFL. He earned the nickname "Chili" in rookie training camp. He currently resides in Daytona Beach, where he runs his annual football clinic.
