= Martin Davies =

Martin Davies may refer to:

- Martin Davies (museum director) (1908–1975), British museum director and civil servant
- Martin Davies (law professor) (born 1957), professor of maritime law
- Martin Davies (writer) (born 1965), British author
- Martin Davies (footballer) (born 1974), Welsh footballer
- Martin Davies (philosopher) (born 1949), British philosopher

== See also ==
- Martin Davis (disambiguation)
