= Jane Bown =

English photographer (1925–2014)

Orson Welles, 1951

John Lennon, 1963

Jane Hope Bown CBE (13 March 1925 – 21 December 2014) was an English photographer who worked for The Observer newspaper from 1949. Her portraits, primarily photographed in black and white and using available light, received widespread critical acclaim and her work has been described by Lord Snowdon as "a kind of English Cartier-Bresson."

== Life and work ==
Bown was born in Eastnor, Herefordshire on 13 March 1925. She described her childhood as happy, brought up in Dorset by women whom she believed to be her aunts. Bown said she was upset to realise, at the age of twelve, that one of them was her mother and her birth was illegitimate. This discovery precipitated her into delinquent behaviour in her adolescence, and acting coldly towards her mother. Her father had been the over sixty year old Charles Wentworth Bell who had employed her mother as a nurse. She first worked as a chart corrector with the WRNS, which included a role in plotting the D-Day invasion, and this employment entitled her to an education grant. She then studied photography at Guildford School of Art under Ifor Thomas.

Bown began her career as a wedding portrait photographer until 1951, when Thomas put her in touch with Mechthild Nawiasky, a picture editor at The Observer. Nawiasky showed her portfolio to editor David Astor who was impressed and immediately commissioned her to photograph the philosopher Bertrand Russell.

Bown worked primarily in black-and-white and preferred to use available light. Until the early 1960s, she worked primarily with a Rolleiflex camera. Subsequently, Bown used a 35 mm Pentax SLR, before settling on the Olympus OM-1 camera, often using an 85 mm lens. She photographed hundreds of subjects, including Orson Welles, Samuel Beckett, Sir John Betjeman, Woody Allen, Cilla Black, Quentin Crisp, P. J. Harvey, John Lennon, Truman Capote, John Peel, the gangster Charlie Richardson, Field Marshal Sir Gerald Templer, Jarvis Cocker, Björk, Jayne Mansfield, Diana Dors, Henri Cartier-Bresson, Eve Arnold, Evelyn Waugh, Brassai and Margaret Thatcher. She took Queen Elizabeth II's eightieth birthday portrait.

Bown's extensive photojournalism output includes series on Hop Pickers, evictions of Greenham Common Women's Peace Camp, Butlin's holiday resort, the British Seaside, and in 2002, the Glastonbury festival. Her social documentary and photojournalism was mostly unseen before the release of her book Unknown Bown 1947–1967 (2007).

In 2007, her work from Greenham Common was selected by Val Williams and Susan Bright as part of How We Are: Photographing Britain, the first major survey of photography to be held at Tate Britain.

A documentary about Bown, Looking For Light (2014), directed by Luke Dodd and Michael Whyte, features Bown conversing about her life and interviews those she photographed and worked with, including Edna O'Brien, Lynn Barber and Richard Ashcroft.

In June 2014, Bown was awarded an honorary degree from the University for the Creative Arts.

== Private life ==
In 1954, Bown married the fashion retail executive Martin Moss. The couple had three children, Matthew, Louisa, and Hugo. Moss pre-deceased her in 2007.

On 21 December 2014, Bown died at the age of 89. Paying tribute to her work, Lord Snowdon described her as "a kind of English Cartier-Bresson" who produced "photography at its best. She doesn't rely on tricks or gimmicks, just simple, honest recording, but with a shrewd and intellectual eye."

== Awards ==
- 1985: Member of the Order of the British Empire (MBE)
- 1995: Commander of the Order of the British Empire (CBE)
- 2000: Honorary Fellowship of The Royal Photographic Society

== Exhibitions ==
- The Gentle Eye, National Portrait Gallery, London, 1980–1981
- Rock 1963–2003, September–October 2003, The Guardian Newsroom, London
- Jane Bown, February–April 2005, National Portrait Gallery, London
- Unknown Bown 1947–1967, Guardian Newsroom, London, 2007–2008
- How We Are: Photographing Britain, Tate Britain, 2007. With others. Included Bown's work from Greenham Common.
- Jane Bown: Exposures, December 2009 – April 2010, National Portrait Gallery, London
- Jane Bown: Play Shadow, November 2025 – April 2026, Newlands House Gallery, Petworth

== Publications ==
- The Gentle Eye (1980)
- Women of Consequence (1986)
- Men of Consequence (1987)
- The Singular Cat (1988)
- Pillars of the Church (1991)
- Observer (1996)
- Faces: The Creative Process Behind Great Portraits (2000)
- Rock 1963–2003 (2003)
- Unknown Bown 1947–1967 (2007)
- Exposures (2009)
- A Lifetime of Looking (2015)
- Jane Bown: Cats (2016)

== Collections ==
Bown's work is held in the following permanent collections:

- Palace of Westminster, London
- National Portrait Gallery, London
- Falmouth Art Gallery

== General references ==
- Tate Britain, 'How We Are: Photographing Britain' Press Release
- Tate Britain, 'How We Are: Photographing Britain', Guide to Room 5 – 'The Urge to Document 1970–1990' which included work on the 1984 Greenham Common evictions by Jane Bown
