= Newlands House Gallery =

Art gallery in Petworth, England

Newlands House Gallery is a British gallery of modern and contemporary art, photography and design located in Petworth, West Sussex.

== Background ==
The gallery occupies a 7,500 square feet (700 m^{2}) Grade II listed Georgian townhouse and adjacent coach house. The building was originally built for Dr. Newlands in the 18th century and was previously occupied by an antiques and interiors shop.

The gallery was opened in March 2020 by Simon de Pury. Comprising 12 rooms, the gallery stages exhibitions focused on great artists of the 20th century. It has also developed a community-focused programme that builds on the heritage of its location, and Petworth's reputation for excellence in music, literature and antiques. It is curated by Maya Binkin, and the building is owned by Nicola Jones.

== Past exhibitions ==
- Helmut Newton 100 (2020)
- Ron Arad 69 (2020–2021)
- From The Real: Liliane Tomasko and Sean Scully (2021)
- Joan Miró. La Gran Belleza (2021)
- Julian Opie: Collected Works/Works Collected (2021–2022)
- Frank Auerbach: Unseen (2022)
- Lee Miller & Picasso (2022–2023)
- Two Worlds Entwined: Annie Morris and Idris Khan (2023)
- Eve Arnold – To Know About Women (2023–2024)
- Nick Brandt – The Day May Break + SINK / RISE (2024)
- Leonora Carrington: Rebel Visionary (2024)
- Jane Bown: Play Shadow (2025–2026)
