= Martin Davis =

Martin Davis may refer to:

- Martin Davis (Australian footballer) (born 1936), Australian rules footballer
- Martin Davis (Jamaican footballer) (born 1996), Jamaican footballer
- Martin Davis (mathematician) (1928–2023), American mathematician
- Martin Davis (tennis) (born 1958), American former tennis player
- Martin Jay Davis (1937–2022), American astrologer, author and Olympic fencer
- Martin K. Davis (1843–1936), Union Army soldier during the American Civil War
- Martin S. Davis (1927–1999), Paramount Communications executive

== See also ==
- Martin Davies (disambiguation)
