= Martin Klein =

Martin Klein may refer to:

- Martin Klein (footballer) (born 1984), Czech international footballer
- Martin Klein (wrestler) (1884–1947), Estonian wrestler
- Martin Klein (engineer) (born 1941), American engineer and inventor
- Martin A. Klein, historian of the Atlantic slave trade
- Martin J. Klein (1924–2009), American science historian
- R. Martin Klein (born 1947), American voice actor
- Marty Klein, art professor
