= Martin Bonnet =

German engineer and professor (born 1968)

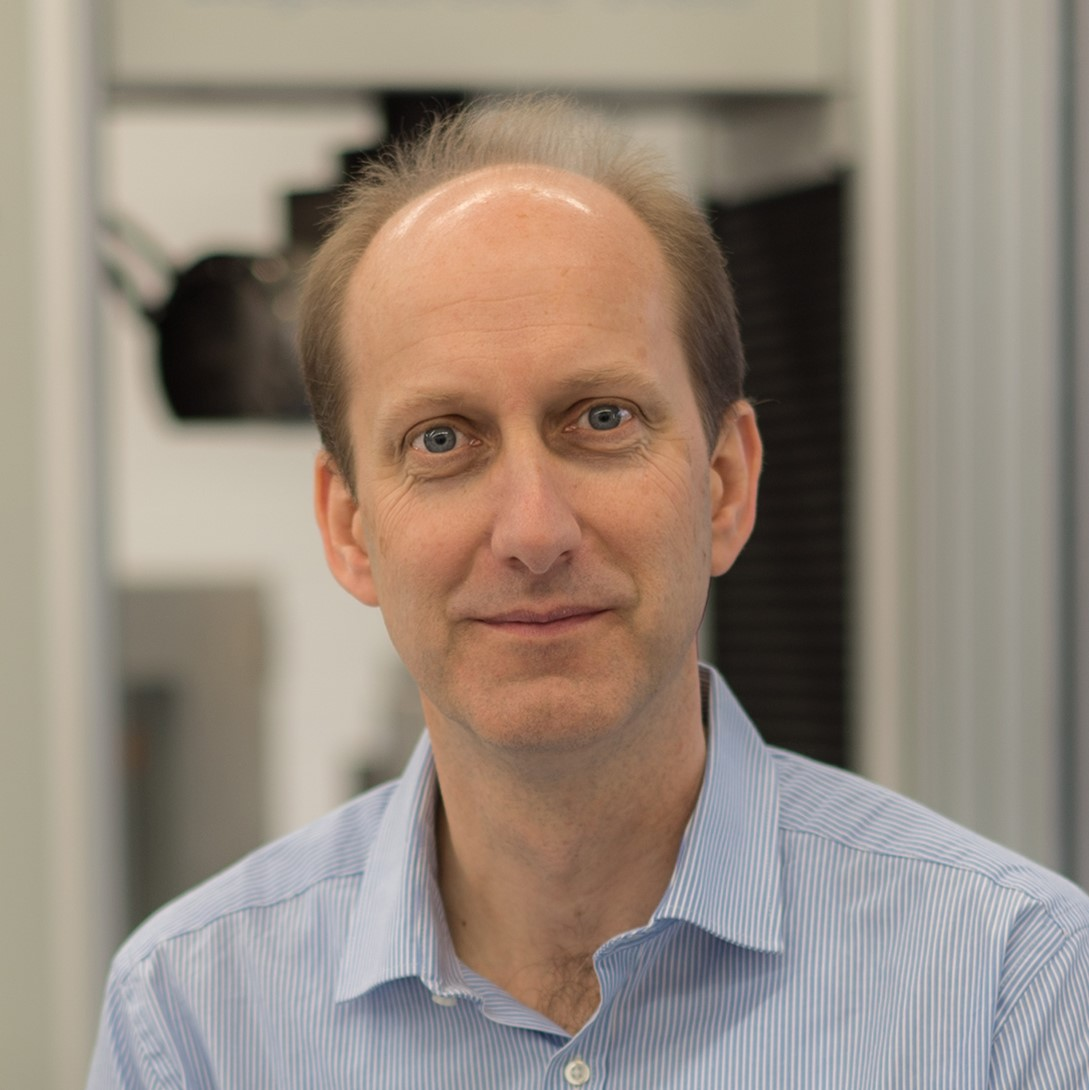
- Born: 8 December 1968 (age 57); Essen
- Education: Technical University of Dortmund
- Occupations: Engineer, university professor

Martin Bonnet (born 8 December 1968 in Essen) is a German engineer and university professor. He is managing director of the Institute for Applied Materials at the Cologne University of Applied Sciences where he also teaches materials science.

== Career ==
After graduating as an engineer at the Faculty of Chemical Engineering (today: Faculty of Chemistry and Chemical Biology) at the Technical University of Dortmund, Bonnet obtained his doctoral degree in 1999. Following his studies Bonnet worked as an executive in the field of research and development at the company Sika-Trocal.

After being appointed professor for materials science and polymer engineering in 2004 Bonnet manages the Institute for Applied Materials at the Faculty of Process Engineering, Energy and Mechanical Systems at the Cologne University of Applied Sciences as a director since 2009.

Since 2012 Bonnet is a visiting professor at the institute for Biomechanics and Orthopaedics at German Sports University Cologne. He also held visiting professorships at the German-Jordanian University in Jordan and the Beijing University of Chemical Technology in China. Bonnet is an active member of the resources' committee to the post-graduate institute of North Rhine-Westphalia (Graduierteninstitut NRW).

In 2016, Bonnet started his YouTube channel "Welt der Werkstoffe" which has reached more than 30,000 subscriptions and more than 4 million views. On the channel Bonnet publishes educational videos on the subject of materials science but also entertaining videos about the topic.

== Awards ==
- Professor of the year 2021 (2nd place in the category Engineering/Informatics)
- Winner of the state teaching award of the state of North Rhine-Westphalia 2019 in the category academic teaching
- Winner of the teaching award 2019 Cologne University of Applied Sciences, Gamification as a Serious Game in the mandatory module of the undergraduate class "Werkstofftechnik"
- Fellowship for innovations in digital academic teaching, awarded by the Stifterverband (Gamification as a Serious Game)
- Winner of the teaching award 2013, Cologne University of Applied Sciences (inverted-classroom concept)

== Publications ==
- Werkstoffkunde 1&2, M. Bonnet, 2021, Publisher: StudyHelp, ISBN 978-3947506705
- Wiley-Schnellkurs Werkstoffkunde, M. Bonnet, 2017 ISBN 9783527530236
- Kunststofftechnik, M. Bonnet, 3., überarb. u. erw. Aufl. 2016, Verlag: Springer Vieweg ISBN 978-3-658-13827-1
- Kunststofftechnik: Grundlagen, Verarbeitung, Werkstoffauswahl und Fallbeispiele, M. Bonnet, 2., überarb. u. erw. Aufl. 2014, XIII, Verlag: Springer Vieweg ISBN 978-3-658-03138-1
- Kunststoffe in der Ingenieuranwendung: verstehen und zuverlässig auswählen, M. Bonnet, 2009. XII Verlag: Vieweg+Teubner ISBN 9783834803498
- Flexidone – A New Class of Innovative PVC Plasticizers, M. Bonnet, H. Kaytan, Recent Advances in Plasticizers, Publisher: InTech, Published: March 21, 2012, Hg.: M. Luqman ISBN 978-953-51-0363-9
- Untersuchungen zum endothermen "Temperpeak" von zwei ausgesuchten Kunststoffen, M. Bonnet, K.-D. Rogausch, J. Petermann, "Anwenderseminar Dynamisch-Mechanische Analyse und Rheologie", ecomed Verlag, Landsberg 2000, 69–78, Hg.: H. Utschick, F. Soergel ISBN 3-609-68489-5
