= Martin O'Neill (disambiguation) =

Martin O'Neill (born 1952) is a retired footballer and current football manager.

Martin O'Neill may also refer to:

- Martin O'Neill, Baron O'Neill of Clackmannan (1945–2020), Scottish politician
- Martin O'Neill (footballer, born 1975), Scottish footballer
- Martin O'Neill (hurler) (born 1992), Irish hurler
- Martin O'Neill (philosopher), political philosopher
