= Martín Ríos =

Martín Ríos may refer to:

- Martín Ríos (footballer) (born 1977), Argentine footballer
- Martín Ríos (judoka) (born 1978), Argentine judoka
- Martín Ríos (murderer) (born 1979), Argentine murderer
- Martín Malagón Ríos (born 1964), Mexican politician
- Martin Rios (curler) (born 1981), Spanish-Swiss curler
