= Martin Davies (law professor) =

UK-born law professor

- Born: September 30, 1957
- Education: University of Oxford (BA, BCL, MA); Harvard University (LLM)

Martin J. Davies (born 30 September 1957) is a UK-born professor of maritime law and heads the Maritime Law Center at Tulane University Faculty of Law, New Orleans, where he is the Admiralty Law Institute Professor of Maritime Law. He is a graduate of Oxford University (B.A. in Jurisprudence, 1978; B.C.L. 1979; M.A. 1983) and Harvard University (LL.M., 1980), and serves on the editorial board of Lloyd's Maritime and Commercial Law Quarterly. He became a Titulary Member of the Comité Maritime International in 2019. In 2021, he was accepted for the award of the degree of Doctor of Civil Law (D.C.L.) at the University of Oxford, a degree to be awarded in 2022.
