= Martin Lang =

Martin Lang may refer to:

- Martin Lang (canoeist) (born 1968), German slalom canoeist
- Martin Lang (fencer) (born 1949), American fencer
- Martin Lang (rugby league) (born 1975), Australian rugby league footballer
