= Martin Hansen =

Martin Hansen may refer to:

- Martin Hansen (boxer) (1925–1999), Danish Olympic boxer
- Martin Hansen (footballer) (born 1990), Danish football goalkeeper
- Martin A. Hansen (1909–1955), Danish author
- Martin Haldbo Hansen (born 1969), Danish rower
- Martin Lundgaard Hansen (born 1972), Danish badminton player
- Martin Hansen, or Wunder (gamer) (born 1998), Danish professional gamer

== See also ==
- Martin Hanson (1923–1976), Australian politician
- Martin Hansson (born 1971), Swedish football referee
- Martin Hansson (skier) (born 1975), Swedish alpine skier
