= Martin A. Maland =

American politician (1846–1944)

Martin Austin Maland (August 23, 1846 – August 21, 1944) was an American businessman, farmer and politician.

Maland was born in Racine County, Wisconsin and then moved to Harmony Township, Fillmore County, Minnesota in 1857, with his parents.. He went to La Crosse Business College in La Crosse, Wisconsin, Luther College, in Decorah, Iowa, and Winona State University. Maland lived in Highland, Minnesota, in Fillmore County with his wife and family and was a farmer. He was also in with the banking business. Maland served in the Minnesota House of Representatives in 1885 and 1886 and in 1889 and 1890. In 1892, Maland moved to Rushford, Minnesota with his wife and family. He served on the Rushford School Board and on the Fillmore County Commission. Maland died at his home in Rushford, Minnesota and was buried in Rushford, Minnesota.
