= Martin Schörner =

German politician (born 1986)

Member of the Landtag of Hesse
- Incumbent
- Assumed office 1 August 2026

Personal details
- Born: 3 June 1986 (age 40)
- Party: Christian Democratic Union (since 2016)

Martin Schörner (born 3 June 1986) is a German politician serving as a member of the Landtag of Hesse since 2026. He has served as managing director of the Christian Democratic Union in Hersfeld-Rotenburg since 2018, and as managing director of the party in Werra-Meißner since 2020.
