= Dave Pureifory =

American football player (1949–2009)

No. 75, 68
- Positions: Defensive end, Defensive tackle

Personal information
- Born: July 12, 1949; Pensacola, Florida, U.S.
- Died: March 5, 2009 (aged 59); Ann Arbor, Michigan, U.S.
- Listed height: 6 ft 1 in (1.85 m)
- Listed weight: 260 lb (118 kg)

Career information
- College: Eastern Michigan
- NFL draft: 1972: 6th round, 142nd overall pick

Career history
- Green Bay Packers (1972–1977); Cincinnati Bengals (1978); Detroit Lions (1978–1982); Michigan Panthers (1984); Birmingham Stallions (1984–1985)

Awards and highlights
- 2× Second-team Little All-American (1970, 1971)

Career NFL statistics
- Sacks: 61
- Safeties: 1
- Fumble recoveries: 6
- Stats at Pro Football Reference

David Lee Pureifory (/ˈpjʊərɪfɔɪ/ PURE-ih-foy; July 12, 1949 – March 5, 2009), was an American professional football player who was a defensive end and defensive tackle for three teams in an 11-year career in the National Football League (NFL). He played college football for the Eastern Michigan University (EMU) Hurons (now known as the EMU Eagles). He had five sacks and a safety in a single December 1975 game. He was part of the Detroit Lions' "Silver Rush" defensive line (1978 to 1982).

== Early life ==
Pureifory was born on July 12, 1949, in Pensacola, Florida. He grew up in Ecorse, Michigan. He attended Ecorse High School. Pureifory played on the school's football team. His name was misspelled as Purifoy throughout his high school years. His older brother Willie Purefoy also attended Ecorse and would later be a college football teammate of Pureifory, after completing his military service. Willie spelled his surname Purefoy, rather than Pureifory; the difference being how the two brothers' names were spelled on their birth certificates.

== College career ==
Pureifory attended college at Eastern Michigan University (EMU), in Ypsilanti, Michigan, where he ultimately earned a master's degree in guidance and counseling. Pureifory played on the EMU Hurons (now Eagles) football team. The 6 ft 2 in (1.88) 220 lb (99.8 kg) Pureifory was a defensive tackle and/or defensive end as a freshman in 1968, leading the team in tackles-for-loss and second on the team in tackles. He recorded a safety, and was also the only EMU lineman to intercept a pass in 1968. The 1968 EMU team finished seventh in the final Associated Press (AP) poll of small colleges. The 225 lb (102.1 kg) Pureifory played tackle for the Hurons as a sophomore in 1969.

Pureifory was a defensive tackle in his junior (1970) and senior (1971) seasons, and EMU's team captain as a senior. He led the team in tackles-for-loss (25) again in 1970. The National Association of Intercollegiate Athletics (NAIA) selected him first-team on its 1970 Little All-America college football team. The American Football Coaches Association selected Pureifory first-team and/or second-team College Division All-America in 1970 and 1971. The Associated Press selected Pureifory second-team College Division All-America in 1970 and 1971 at tackle. EMU was undefeated during the regular season in 1971. The Hurons' defense, led by Pureifory, only allowed one touchdown in their final five games. EMU was invited to a post-season game for the first time in school history, but lost in the Pioneer Bowl to the Louisiana Tech Bulldogs, 14–3.

Pureifory was also a district champion in the shot put as a member of EMU's track team in 1969.

== Professional career ==
=== Green Bay Packers ===
Pureifory was selected in the sixth round of the 1972 NFL draft by the Green Bay Packers, 142nd overall. The Packers had obtained that draft pick from the Chicago Bears in a trade for veteran defensive back Bob Jeter. During Pureifory's six-year career with the Packers, he became known for not speaking with the media, as well as his improved play as a defensive lineman.

Pureifory was a reserve defensive end and special teams player as a rookie, appearing in all 14 Packers' games but not starting any. He injured his knee during a 1972 playoff game against the Washington Redskins. He had knee surgery at the end of December. In his second season (1973), Pureifory remained a reserve defensive end; appearing in 13 games and starting one game. He had one quarterback sack that season. In 1974, Pureifory started five games at right defensive tackle, with four sacks. Packers' defensive coordinator and defensive line coach Dave Hanner found Pureifory very coachable and an extremely hard worker; allowing Pureifory to improve tremendously in the tackle position.

During the 1975 preseason, Packers' head coach Bart Starr specifically identified Pureifory as one Packer who was "performing very well". Pureifory became a full-time starter at right defensive tackle for the Packers during the 1975 season, playing both at nose guard and in a conventional tackle position. He had 11 quarterback sacks, two fumble recoveries and a safety. He was known as an aggressive player, frequently jumping offsides, but also leading the team in sacks that season. Pureifory had nine sacks in the Packers last four or five games of 1975.

Pureifory had five sacks in a December 14, 1975 game against the Los Angeles Rams, one of which resulted in a safety when he tackled Rams' quarterback Ron Jaworski in the end zone. During the first two games of 1975, he filled in as a placekicker for injured kicker Chester Marcol, against the Detroit Lions and Denver Broncos. In four extra point attempts, Pureifory was successful twice. He also blocked a punt against the Broncos.

In 1976, Pureifory suffered a dislocated toe in late September and missed playing time during the season after that. He started only eight games that season for the Packers, with three sacks and one fumble recovery. In 1977, he started 12 games at right tackle for the Packers, and reportedly had six sacks and one fumble recovery that season. Other sources report him as having tied for the 1977 Packers' team lead with eight sacks.

=== Pittsburgh Steelers, New England Patriots, and Cincinnati Bengals ===
In early May 1978, the Packers traded Pureifory to the Pittsburgh Steelers for a fifth-round selection in a draft day trade. In late August 1978, the Steelers traded Pureifory to the New England Patriots for their 1979 sixth-round pick. The Patriots released him one week later, and he was picked up by the Cincinnati Bengals for the $100 waiver fee. He appeared in seven games for the Bengals, without any starts. The Bengals released Pureifory on October 17, 1978.

=== Detroit Lions ===
The Detroit Lions signed Pureifory as a free agent less than a week after his release by the Bengals. Pureifory moved from defensive tackle to defensive end when he came to Detroit, and was able to succeed in that new position under the tutelage of defensive line coach Floyd Peters. It was in Detroit where Pureifory saw his greatest success; starting every game in which he appeared from 1978 to 1982, until his NFL career was shortened by leg injuries.

In 1978, he started eight games at left defensive end for the Lions, with 3.5 sacks and one forced fumble. In 1979, he was the Lions' starting left defensive end in all 15 games in which he appeared, with 7.5 sacks, one forced fumble and one fumble recovery. In 1980, Pureifory was selected as Detroit's Most Valuable Defensive Player, starting all 16 games, with 6.5 sacks and one forced fumble. In 1981, he had a career-high 11.5 sacks in 15 starts at left defensive end, along with two forced fumbles. He was tied for sixth most sacks in the NFL that season.

In the strike-shortened 1982 NFL season, Pureifory had seven sacks in nine games; tied for ninth best in the NFL that season. He had ½ sack in the Lions' January 1983 loss to the Washington Redskins in the NFC wildcard playoff round; in what would be his last NFL game. Pureifory suffered with leg injuries in 1981 and 1982 that finally ended his NFL career. He failed a physical examination in July 1983, and never rejoined the Lions as an active player.

==== The "Silver Rush" ====
Pureifory was part of the Lions' "Silver Rush" defensive line under Floyd Peters. The Lions' line under Peters was originally labelled the "Silver Rush" in 1978, with Pureifory at left defensive end, John Woodcock at left defensive tackle, Doug English at right tackle and rookie Al "Bubba" Baker at right defensive end. The Lions had 55 quarterback sacks that season, second most in the NFL. In 1979, the Lions' defensive line included Pureifory, English, Baker and Dave Gallagher at left defensive tackle, on a defense that was 23rd in the NFL in points allowed, 11th in total yards allowed, and tied for eighth in sacks.

In 1980, Pureifory and Baker were the defensive ends, with William Gay at left defensive tackle and John Mendenhall at right defensive tackle on the Silver Rush line. The Lions were first in the NFL in fewest rushing yards allowed, third best in the NFL in fewest total yards allowed, sixth best in points allowed, and eighth best in quarterback sacks. In 1981 and 1982, the Silver Rush line included Pureifory, Gay, Baker and English. In 1981, the Lions were again first in fewest rushing yards allowed, tied for third in quarterback sacks, fourth in the NFL in fewest total yards allowed, and 13th in fewest points allowed. In 1982, the Lions were tied for third in the NFL in most sacks, fourth in fewest rushing yards allowed, ninth in fewest total yards allowed, and 14th in fewest points allowed.

In 63 starts for the Lions, Pureifory had 36 sacks, seven forced fumbles and two fumble recoveries.

=== World Football League ===
Despite his leg injuries, Pureifory later played with the Michigan Panthers and Birmingham Stallions of the United States Football League. In February 1984, the Panthers traded Pureifory to the Stallions for defensive back Mike Thomas.

== Legacy and honors ==
In describing Pureifory's playing days in Detroit, Lions' head coach Monte Clark said of Pureifory, ""Dave was an intense, tough guy . . . He was extremely quick, and that made him tough to block because he got off the ball so fast". Former Green Bay Packers teammate Lynn Dickey said "Dave had a motor that never stopped . . . I played with Dave for two years and I remember how hard he practiced. He was undersized, but very quick and strong. When everyone else was conserving energy in practice, Dave was still going fast. Every team has a guy like that".

In 1981 Pureifory was elected to Eastern Michigan’s Athletic Hall of Fame.

== Personal life and death ==
Pureifory was known throughout his long career for refusing to give media interviews, from his time with the Packers to playing with the Lions. In 1981, he gave a rare interview to Curt Sylvester of the Detroit Free Press, addressing his image as surly or difficult. He told Sylvester "I'm human. What makes me different than other people is that I don't like to hang around with a lot of other people". He counted three deep friendships as essential in his life, and considered himself fortunate to have found more than one true friend in life. The three included former Packers teammate Willie Buchanan, Lions' teammate Al Baker, and former schoolmate Da-I Ping who continued to live in Ypsilanti. He also considered coach Floyd Peters a loyal friend, and Lions' head coach Monte Clark found Pureifory dedicated and cooperative.

Pureifory died at age 59 on March 5, 2009, in Ypsilanti, Michigan. He was survived by his wife and two daughters. Some sources reported the cause of death was said to be from prostate cancer. His obituary at the time stated that he died of pancreatic cancer, and referenced donations being made to the Lustgarten Foundation for Pancreatic Cancer Research.
