= Martin Balasus =

German politician (born 1986)

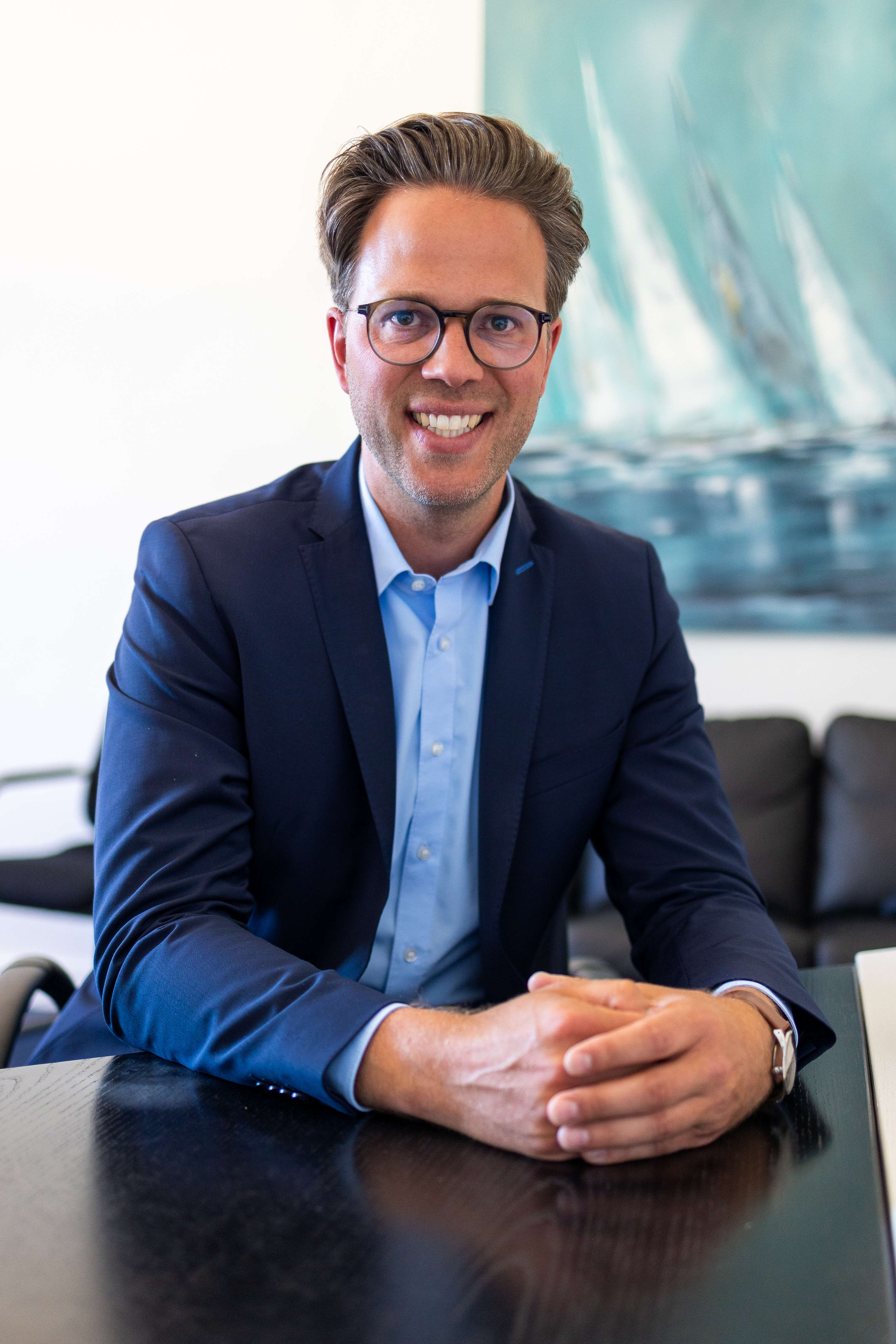
- Balasus in 2023

Member of the Landtag of Schleswig-Holstein
- Incumbent
- Assumed office 7 June 2022
- Preceded by: Barbara Ostmeier
- Constituency: Pinneberg-Elbmarschen

Personal details
- Born: 3 July 1986 (age 39)
- Party: Christian Democratic Union

Martin Balasus (born 3 July 1986) is a German politician serving as a member of the Landtag of Schleswig-Holstein since 2022. He has served as chairman of the Christian Democratic Union in Pinneberg since 2024.
