= Martin Siebenbrunner =

Austrian photographer and entrepreneur (born 1968)

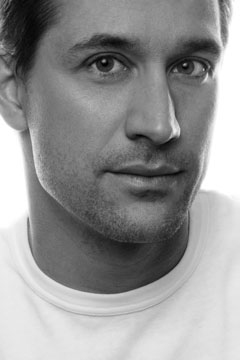
- Born: April 5, 1968; Bregenz, Austria
- Occupation: Photographer
- Website: http://www.martinsiebenbrunner.com

Martin Siebenbrunner (born April 5, 1968, in Bregenz) is an Austrian photographer and entrepreneur.

== Biography ==
Siebenbrunner finished his studies of industrial electronics at the Vienna University of Technology in 1993. One year earlier, beside his studies he founded SiTec – a software company, developing ticketing and reservation systems for cinemas and hotels.

The son of an Austrian family of photographers started 2006 to work as an independent photographer, focused on Glamour- and Fine-art photography. His first exhibition 'Nackt!' in the center of Vienna was widely recognized and helped him to an international breakthrough. Between 2011 and 2013 Martin Siebenbrunner was head of the picture desk of the German Penthouse magazine and signed responsible for a mayor part of covers and photo stories. He published his first Coffee table book 'Private Sessions' in 2014.

Beside a gold medal from the largest European association of photography – Fédération Internationale de l'Art Photographique (FIAP), he was also awarded with a "Gold medal of Excellence" at the Trirenberger Supercircuit.

Martin Siebenbrunner is based in Vienna and Palma de Mallorca.

== Work ==
Martin Siebenbrunners's work is published in several international magazines like FHM, GQ, Penthouse (USA), Volo Magazine (USA) as well as in photo journals i.a. Photographie, Fotospiegel, Fine Art Foto, Photographie Artistique.

He was features in various TV-shows. He shot the finalists in Austria's Next Topmodel and was part of Penthouse model casting, which was documented in RTL2-Exklusiv die Reportage.

== Exhibitions ==
- 2009: Exhibition: „Nackt!“, Vienna
- 2009: Exhibition: „Puppets and puppeteers“, Vienna
- 2010: Exhibition: „makel-los“, Vienna
- 2010: Exhibition: „Wir leben und arbeiten in Vienna“
- 2011: Exhibition: „Heartbeat“, Vienna
- 2011: Exhibition: „Freunde von art-com“
- 2011: Exhibition: „WEISS-SCHWARZ“, Vienna
- 2012: Exhibition: „SELECTED“, Stilwerk Vienna
- 2013: Exhibition: „Vienna Erotic II“, Vienna
- 2013: Exhibition: „Vienna Erotic & more“, Zürich
- 2014: Exhibition: „Private Sessions“, Vienna

== Literature ==
- Private Sessions, echomedia (ISBN 978-3902900814)
- Private Sessions Calendar 2015 (ISBN 978-3664050529)
- BOOBMANIA, Edition Skylight (ISBN 978-3037665855)
