= Vince Thompson =

American football player (born 1957)

No. 38
- Position: Running back

Personal information
- Born: February 21, 1957 (age 69); Trenton, New Jersey, U.S.
- Listed height: 6 ft 0 in (1.83 m)
- Listed weight: 230 lb (104 kg)

Career information
- High school: Woodrow Wilson HS (Levittown, PA)
- College: Villanova
- NFL draft: 1979: undrafted

Career history
- Denver Broncos (1979)*; Philadelphia Eagles (1980)*; Detroit Lions (1981–1984)
- * Offseason or practice squad member only

Awards and highlights
- Second-team All-East (1977)
- Stats at Pro Football Reference

Vincent Thompson (born February 21, 1957) is an American former football running back who played college football for Villanova from 1975 to 1978 and for the Detroit Lions of the National Football League (NFL) in 1981 and 1983. He led the NFL in 1981 with an average of 6.0 yards per carry.

== Early life ==
Thompson was born in Trenton, New Jersey, in 1957. He attended Woodrow Wilson High School (later renamed Harry S. Truman High School) in Levittown, Pennsylvania.

== Villanova ==
Thompson enrolled at Villanova University in Philadelphia, where he was a three-year starter for the Villanova Wildcats football team. As a sophomore in 1976, he was slowed by ankle problems, was healthy in fewer than eight games, but still gained 832 rushing yards on 197 carries, an average of 4.2 yards per carry. As a junior, he had his best season, tallying 977 rushing yards for the 1977 Villanova team. As a senior, he was slowed by a groin pull suffered during the preseason, and later by a hip problem. He still concluded his college career with 639 yards for the 1978 team. He was thrice selected as the team's most valuable player, and he concluded his college career as Villanova's all-time rushing leader with 2,522 yards. He held the Villanova record until October 2000 when Brian Westbrook passed him.

== Professional football ==
Thompson signed with the Denver Broncos as a free agent in May 1979. He missed significant time with a pulled hamstring and subsequently a pulled groin muscle. He was released in August 1979 before the start of the regular season.

In February 1980, Thompson signed as a free agent fullback with the Philadelphia Eagles. He sustained a sprained knee in the first week of camp with the Eagles and eventually recovered, but missed much of his practice time. He was cut by the Eagles in August.

Thompson signed with the Lions in May 1981 as part of the team's "Gong Show" open tryouts for free agents. During the 1981 season, he appeared in 13 games, gained 211 yards, and led the NFL in yards per carry with a 6.03-yard average. His average of 6.03 yards per carry also set a Lions club record for a rookie, breaking the mark of 5.88 set by Nick Pietrosante in 1959, and better than Barry Sanders' rookie mark of 5.25 yards per carry in 1989.

Thompson then missed the entire 1982 season with a pulled stomach muscle. He returned to the Lions in 1983 and gained 138 yards on 40 carries. He signed a further two-year contract with the Lions in January 1984. However, he suffered a career-ending ruptured Achilles tendon during training camp in July 1984.

== Later life and legacy ==
In 2006, Harry S. Truman High School established the Vince Thompson Award given each year to the football player who best demonstrates high athletic excellence. He has also been inducted into the Bucks County Sports Hall of Fame.
