= Alvin Hall (safety) =

American football player (born 1958)

No. 35
- Position: Safety

Personal information
- Born: August 12, 1958 (age 68); Dayton, Ohio, U.S.
- Listed height: 5 ft 10 in (1.78 m)
- Listed weight: 193 lb (88 kg)

Career information
- College: Miami (OH)
- NFL draft: 1980: undrafted

Career history
- Cleveland Browns (1980)*; Detroit Lions (1981–1987)
- * Offseason or practice squad member only

Career NFL statistics
- Interceptions: 7
- Sacks: 1
- Fumble recoveries: 7
- Stats at Pro Football Reference

Alvin Eugene Hall (born August 12, 1958) is an American former professional football player who was a safety for six seasons with the Detroit Lions of the National Football League (NFL). He played college football for the Miami RedHawks.

Hall played at Dayton Fairview High School in Dayton, Ohio. He led the Bulldogs basketball team as the point guard to the first City Conference title in 33 years and played safety on the football team winning their division one year.
