= Don Greco =

American football player (born 1959)

No. 67
- Position: Guard

Personal information
- Born: April 1, 1959 (age 67); St. Louis, Missouri, U.S.
- Listed height: 6 ft 3 in (1.91 m)
- Listed weight: 275 lb (125 kg)

Career information
- High school: Riverview Gardens (St. Louis, Missouri)
- College: Western Illinois
- NFL draft: 1981: 3rd round, 72nd overall pick

Career history
- Detroit Lions (1981–1985)

Career NFL statistics
- Games played: 45
- Games started: 38
- Fumble recoveries: 2
- Stats at Pro Football Reference

Donald Greco (born April 1, 1959) is an American former professional football player who was a guard in the National Football League (NFL). Greco was selected 72nd overall in the third round by the Detroit Lions out of Western Illinois University in the 1981 NFL draft. Greco was inducted into the Western Illinois University Hall of Fame in 2000. He was a two-time All-American, two-time team MVP, two-time All-Conference, and Conference Lineman of the Year. Greco was also nominated for the College Football Hall of Fame.

He was also the head coach of the Pattonville High School in Maryland Heights, Missouri varsity football team's first run at the state championship in 2001. He was the head coach of the Pattonville "Pirates" for 14 seasons. During that time, he led the Pirates to 13 district titles, four Suburban North Titles, eight Sectional Titles and three appearances in the state semifinals. Three of his teams finished the regular season undefeated. Greco's 2000 "Pirate" team made an appearance in the "Show Me Bowl", but fell short of a state crown. During his 14 seasons, he established the longest tenure and the winningest record in the history of the Pattonville Program, (119-45). The St. Louis Post-Dispatch, the St. Louis Rams and the National Football Foundation have named Greco "Coach of the Year". In 2001, he served as defensive coordinator for the River City Renegades of the Indoor Professional Football League. Greco has done work on local cable television as a color commentator for the, St. Louis "Believers" and "Rage" Indoor Football Teams. He is a member of the St. Louis Post-Dispatch "All Millennium Team", selected in December 1999. In 2011, Greco was inducted into the St. Louis Football Coaches Hall of Fame. He is a published author. He has written two books detailing the history of high school football in the St. Louis area.
