= Doug English =

American football player (born 1953)

No. 78
- Position: Defensive tackle

Personal information
- Born: August 25, 1953 (age 73); Dallas, Texas, U.S.
- Listed height: 6 ft 5 in (1.96 m)
- Listed weight: 255 lb (116 kg)

Career information
- High school: Bryan Adams (East Dallas, Texas)
- College: Texas
- NFL draft: 1975: 2nd round, 38th overall pick

Career history
- Detroit Lions (1975–1985)

Awards and highlights
- 2× First-team All-Pro (1982, 1983); 2× Second-team All-Pro (1981, 1984); 4× Pro Bowl (1978, 1981–1983); Detroit Lions 75th Anniversary Team; Detroit Lions All-Time Team; First-team All-American (1974); 2× First-team All-SWC (1973, 1974); Second-team All-SWC (1972); NFL records: Most career safeties: 4 (tied); Most safeties in a season: 2 (tied)

Career NFL statistics
- Sacks: 55.5
- Fumble recoveries: 9
- Games: 131
- Safeties: 4
- Stats at Pro Football Reference
- College Football Hall of Fame

Lowell Douglas English (born August 25, 1953) is an American former professional football player who was a defensive tackle for the Detroit Lions from 1975 to 1985 in the National Football League (NFL). He played college football for the Texas Longhorns. In 2011, he was inducted into the College Football Hall of Fame. As an NFL player, English was selected to play in the Pro Bowl four times and was a first- or second-team All-Pro selection four times. He is tied with three other players for the most safeties in NFL history (through 2025). After retiring from football and having a number of successful businesses, English founded and has been a key funder and fundraiser of the Lone Star Paralysis Foundation, in connection with seeking a cure and treatment for spinal cord injuries.

== Early life ==
English was born on August 25, 1953, in Dallas, Texas, to Lowell D. and Ann (Constantz) English. He was one of four children. Lowell English operated a service station in Highland Park, Texas, and in his sixties became a home builder and land developer.

English graduated from Bryan Adams High School, where he played both offensive and defensive tackle on the school's football team. As a senior in 1970, he was reported at 6 ft 4 in (1.93 m) 215 lb (97.5 kg), and 6 ft 4½ in (1.94 m) 219 lb (99.3 kg). This was the first year he was a regular starter on the football team. In 1970, he was an honorable mention high school All-American. He was an All-District 11 AAAA two-way tackle in 1970, helping the team to a 9–1 record.

== College career ==
English attended the University of Texas, which was the school that first, and most seriously, offered him a football scholarship. Because he only became a starter late in his high school career, English doubted his ability to make it as a player on the renowned Texas Longhorns football team. However, Texas defensive line coach Pat Patterson believed in English's ability, and was the key person recruiting him to play at Texas.

During his time at Texas, English added weight and developed his defensive line skills practicing against teammate Jerry Sisemore, a future College Football Hall of Fame offensive lineman. English played as a starting defensive tackle on the Longhorns' varsity football team in the Southwest Conference (SWC) from 1972 to 1974, averaging 10 tackles per game during his Texas career. He reportedly had 92 or 105 tackles in his senior season.

His first start came in the fourth game of his sophomore season against the No. 2 ranked Oklahoma Sooners. He was anxious and had doubts coming from the locker room toward the playing field. Coach Patterson met English in the tunnel before he got onto the field and said "This ain't no place for a timid man", and then walked away. English has stated that this is the best thing any coach had ever told him, and recalled of the experience, "Other than the birth of my first child, I don't think I've ever had such a revelation. Such a change of heart immediately". His nervousness passed and his mind cleared. Texas lost to Oklahoma, 27–0, their only loss that season; but English had 16 tackles in the game.

English helped lead the Longhorns to two Southwest Conference titles (1972 and 1973). In 1972, the Longhorns were ranked 3rd nationally by the Associated Press (AP), 14th in 1973, and 17th in 1974. The 1972 Longhorns team held opponents to 10 points or less in six of the team's 11 games that year, and went on to win the January 1, 1973 Cotton Bowl, 17–13. The 1973 Longhorns lost to the University of Nebraska in the January 1974 Cotton Bowl, with English having to leave the game in the first quarter with muscle spasms in his back.

The Associated Press selected English as a first-team All-SWC defensive tackle in 1973, as a junior. He was a first-team AP All-American and first-team All-SWC at defensive tackle in 1974, as a senior. English was second in the AP's voting for SWC Defensive Player of the Year, behind nose guard Louie Kelcher of the Southern Methodist University (SMU) Mustangs, who like English went on to play 10 years in the NFL; and who would one day become English's business partner. English was selected the Longhorns' Most Valuable Player in 1974. In 2011, he was inducted into the College Football Hall of Fame.

He was also a member of the Texas Cowboys while attending the University of Texas. He graduated in 1976, with a Bachelor of Arts degree in history.

== Professional career ==
=== Detroit Lions (1975 to 1979) ===
The Detroit Lions selected English in the second round of the 1975 NFL draft, 38th overall. In 1975, he was a reserve defensive tackle. Herb Orvis began the 1976 season as the Lions' starting left defensive tackle, but suffered a knee injury in the second game of the season. English replaced Orvis at left tackle and recovered a fumble in that game. English became the Lions' starting left defensive tackle; but started only five games before he too suffered a season-ending knee injury, during the Lions' seventh game of the season on October 24.

In 1977, English started all 14 games for the Lions at right defensive tackle. He had eight quarterback sacks, one safety and one fumble recovery. He also caused a key fumble by running back Tom Sullivan in an early October game against the Philadelphia Eagles, and his former Longhorns' teammate Jerry Sisemore (playing right guard for the Eagles).

Monte Clark became the Lions' head coach in April 1978. While finding most of his team out of shape, English was one of the few players Clark commended for outstanding effort, after bench pressing 420 lb (190.5 kg). English had a knee injury in 1978, but started 13 games at right defensive tackle that season. He reportedly had seven or eight sacks, and 57 unassisted tackles. He was also selected to the Pro Bowl for the first time; and United Press International (UPI) named him second-team All-NFC. In the Lions' 17–14 nationally televised victory over the Denver Broncos on Thanksgiving Day 1978, English sacked quarterback Craig Morton four times. He had been named a team captain that day, and received the game ball from coach Clark.

The 1978 Lions had 55 total sacks, second best in the NFL; and going into the 1979 season the 6 ft 5 in (1.96 m) 260 lb (117.9 kg) English was the leader of the defensive line. In 1979, he started all 16 Lions' games at right tackle. He had 6.5 sacks, three forced fumbles, two fumble recoveries and a safety. English led the Lions in tackles, with 122 tackles (90 solo). He was voted as the 1979 Lions' defensive most valuable player.

=== One season retirement (1980) ===
In August 1980, English sent a letter from Great Britain to Lions' head coach Monte Clark, that he was no longer going to play football; but rather would be pursuing business interests in the United States and overseas. Shortly after that, the Lions placed English on injured reserve. English later said that he had retired from football at age 26, before the 1980 season, because he had tired of the game and the Lions lack of success, and was experiencing a growing cynicism within himself about the nature of being a professional football player. He believed that the life of a professional football player hindered the player's development as an independent person, able to fend for themselves financially once their football career ended. English returned to his home in Austin, Texas and went into the oil business in the United states and abroad. He stayed in contact with the Lions throughout his retirement, however, and coach Clark made clear English could rejoin the team if he wanted to do so. By spring 1981, with the understanding he would continue in the oil business in the off seasons, English decided to return to the Lions. Clark did not blame English for taking time off, stating "You'll live a long time. But you won't play football forever".

Before his hiatus, in the first part of his career, English played because he had always played football, and his motivations came from himself. After returning from his hiatus, English said "When I took that year off and saw the forest for the trees, I changed. And what I learned was that football is not important. I thought it was important, and most people do think it's important. . . . It's what you do with that credibility – with the fame from playing and playing well. You have a tremendous bully pulpit. You now have more power than ever". For English, football was no longer an end in itself, but offered a platform from which he would be able to do important things with his life through the impact he could have on other people.

=== Detroit Lions (1981 to 1985) ===
English started 16 games at right tackle for the Lions in 1981. He tied Lions' right defensive end Al "Bubba" Baker with nine sacks, second only to left defensive end Dave Pureifory (11.5) on the Lions that season. English also had one forced fumble and three fumble recoveries. He was named to play in the Pro Bowl for the second time. The Newspaper Enterprise Association (NEA) and Pro Football Weekly selected English first-team All-Pro; and the Associated Press named him second-team All-Pro.

In the strike-shortened 1982 season, English started all nine Lions' games. He had 4.5 sacks, two forced fumbles and one fumble recovery. He was again selected to play in the Pro Bowl. The Associated Press named English first-team All-Pro, and the NEA named him second team All-Pro that season. The Lions made the playoffs for the first time in English's career, losing to the Washington Redskins, 31–7 in the wild card round. English sacked Washington quarterback Joe Theisman for an 11-yard loss in that game.

English's best season came in 1983, when he recorded 13 sacks and two safeties. He led the NFL in safeties and was tied for ninth in sacks. His safeties came in consecutive weeks in September against Jerry Golsteyn of the Tampa Bay Buccaneers (September 4), and Brian Sipe of the Cleveland Browns (September 11). English is one of only 19 NFL players to record two safeties in a single season (through 2025).

In 1983, English was selected to his third consecutive Pro Bowl since returning from retirement. The Pro Football Writers of America named his first-team All-Pro and the AP and NEA named his second-team All-Pro. In 1983, the Lions won the NFC Central Division title with a 9–7 record. This was the only season English played for a Lions' team with a winning record. The Lions lost to the San Francisco 49ers, 24–23, in the divisional round of the playoffs. English sacked future Hall of Fame quarterback Joe Montana in that game.

English started all 16 games as the Lions' right tackle in 1984. He had four forced fumbles, one fumble recovery and five sacks. The AP named him second-team All-Pro. In 1985, Clark was replaced as head coach by Darryl Rogers. Rogers and defensive coordinator Wayne Fontes moved English to nose tackle in the team's new 3–4 defensive alignment. English originally had a negative view of the 3–4 defense, and the "dronish" role it gave linemen in favor of allowing linebackers to make plays, but agreed to the move for the good of the team; and during training camp English felt invigorated by the defensive change.

English started all 10 games in which he appeared in 1985, with two sacks. He suffered a neck injury in the season's 10th game against the 1985 Chicago Bears, one of the best teams in NFL history. He experienced tingling and numbness during the game, but did not take himself out until the fourth quarter, because he did not want to "abandon ship" and leave the game while his team was losing. The injury was a ruptured disc in English's neck that ended his career at age 32. He underwent surgery to remove the disk, but in early 1986 the team doctor and English's surgeon recommended that English retire rather than risk more serious consequences by continuing to play; and so English announced his retirement in May 1986.

English finished his career with 55.5 sacks, unofficially, which places him ninth on the Lions’ all-time list (through 2025). He also is reported to have had 59 unofficial sacks. Sacks became an official statistic in 1982, and 25 of his sacks were official sacks. The AP named first-team All-Pro in 1982 and second-team three times (1981, 1983–84). He also went to four Pro Bowls (1979, 1982–84). English had four safeties throughout his career, tying him with Ted Hendricks, Jared Allen and Justin Houston for the most safeties in NFL history (through 2025).

=== The "Silver Rush" ===
In 1978, English was part of the Lions' "Silver Rush" defensive line under defensive line coach Floyd Peters. The Lions' line under Peters was originally labelled the "Silver Rush" in 1978, with English at right tackle, rookie Al "Bubba" Baker at right defensive end, John Woodcock at left defensive tackle, and Dave Pureifory at left defensive end. The Lions had 55 quarterback sacks that season, second most in the NFL. In 1979, the Lions' defensive line included English, Pureifory, Baker and Dave Gallagher at left defensive tackle, on a defense that was 23rd in the NFL in points allowed, 11th in total yards allowed, and tied for eighth in sacks.

After sitting out the 1980 season, English rejoined the Silver Rush. In 1981 and 1982, the Silver Rush line included English, Baker, Pureifory, and William Gay at left tackle. In 1981, the Lions were first in fewest rushing yards allowed, tied for third in quarterback sacks, fourth in the NFL in fewest total yards allowed, and 13th in fewest points allowed. In 1982, with Ed Khayat now defensive line coach, the Lions were tied for third in the NFL in most sacks, fourth in fewest rushing yards allowed, ninth in fewest total yards allowed, and 14th in fewest points allowed. By 1983, English was the only member of the original Silver Rush left on the Lions' starting defensive line. The 1983 Lions were second in the NFL in fewest points allowed, 11th in total yards allowed, and 13th in total sacks.

=== National Football League Players Association ===
During his career, English was active in the National Football League Players Association (NFLPA), and would travel to various American cities as a player representative. He also volunteered to work with children in NFLPA job corps camps and with children suffering difficulties in their lives.

== Legacy and honors ==
In 2011, English was inducted into the College Football Hall of Fame. In 2008, he was among 36 players selected to the Detroit Lions' 75th anniversary all-time team. In 1997, he was inducted into the Texas High School Football Hall of Fame. He was inducted into the University of Texas Athletics Hall of Fame in 1986. As a senior at the University of Texas, he received the George “Hook” McCullough Outstanding Football Player Award and the D. Harold Byrd Leadership Award. He was inducted into the Texas Sports Hall of Fame in 2014, and the Michigan Sports Hall of Fame in 2015.

English was admired for his character as a person. At the time of English's retirement, author and journalist Mitch Albom described how English was liked and admired by coaches, players and people from all walks of life for his personable, considerate and generous nature toward all the people he met, whatever their role in life; and for his kindness and the time he gave to suffering children. Lions' general manager Russ Thomas said of English "He's just one of the very class people who have a positive influence with any people he comes in contact with . . . I don't know if I could find words to explain what he meant to our program both on and off the field". With the new perspective he gained after his one-year retirement, when giving autographs to young people he would make the effort to ask them about their lives and speak to them about the importance of taking responsibility in life. He received a letter from the mother of one young man with whom he had this kind of interaction, telling English that the conversation had turned her son's life around; astounding English with the kind of positive impact he could have.

== Personal life ==
During his professional football career, English worked for National Bank Services, a company operated by former Heisman Trophy winner and retired Detroit Lion Steve Owens. By the time English retired himself, he owned a marketing firm, United Tenant Services, that was headquartered in Austin and operated in 16 cities. English became co-owner with Louie Kelcher, a former college rival with the SMU Mustangs, in the warehousing firm Pro Line Warehouse and Distribution. Later, English designed and created a piece of exercise equipment based on his experience unrolling bales of hay, and sold it through his company, PowerDrive Training Products. He also had a cattle ranch.

English was a sponsor of the Austin Golf Classic soon after his retirement, raising funds for the Muscular Dystrophy Association; and later this event came to raise funds for the Lone Star Paralysis Foundation. Among his friends in Texas was singer Willie Nelson.

Based upon his own injury experience with his cervical spine, and more serious spinal injuries to other people he knew, English founded and funded the Lone Star Paralysis Foundation (LSPF), of which he was also president of its board of directors. This foundation does research on curing and treating spinal cord injuries. In 2011, he was honored by the University Medical Center Brackenridge (UMCB) for LSPF's contributions that provided state-of-the-art medical equipment to UMCB's Brain & Spine Recovery Center, in its program to work on recovery for those with spinal injuries. In addition, LSPF raises money to purchase wheelchairs for those in need and to fund wheelchair sports leagues. Since its inception, the LSPF has raised over five million dollars. He was among the 2020–2024 honorees of the University of Texas at Austin, College of Natural Sciences, to receive the Distinguished Service Award.

English and his wife Claire have two children. When English's son Blake was in ninth grade, he told English that he wanted to stop playing defensive line in football and would rather join the school band. English said "I was a very relieved dad . . . I told him, 'Son, that means I’ll never have to take you to the hospital'".
