= William Gay (defensive lineman) =

American football player (born 1955)

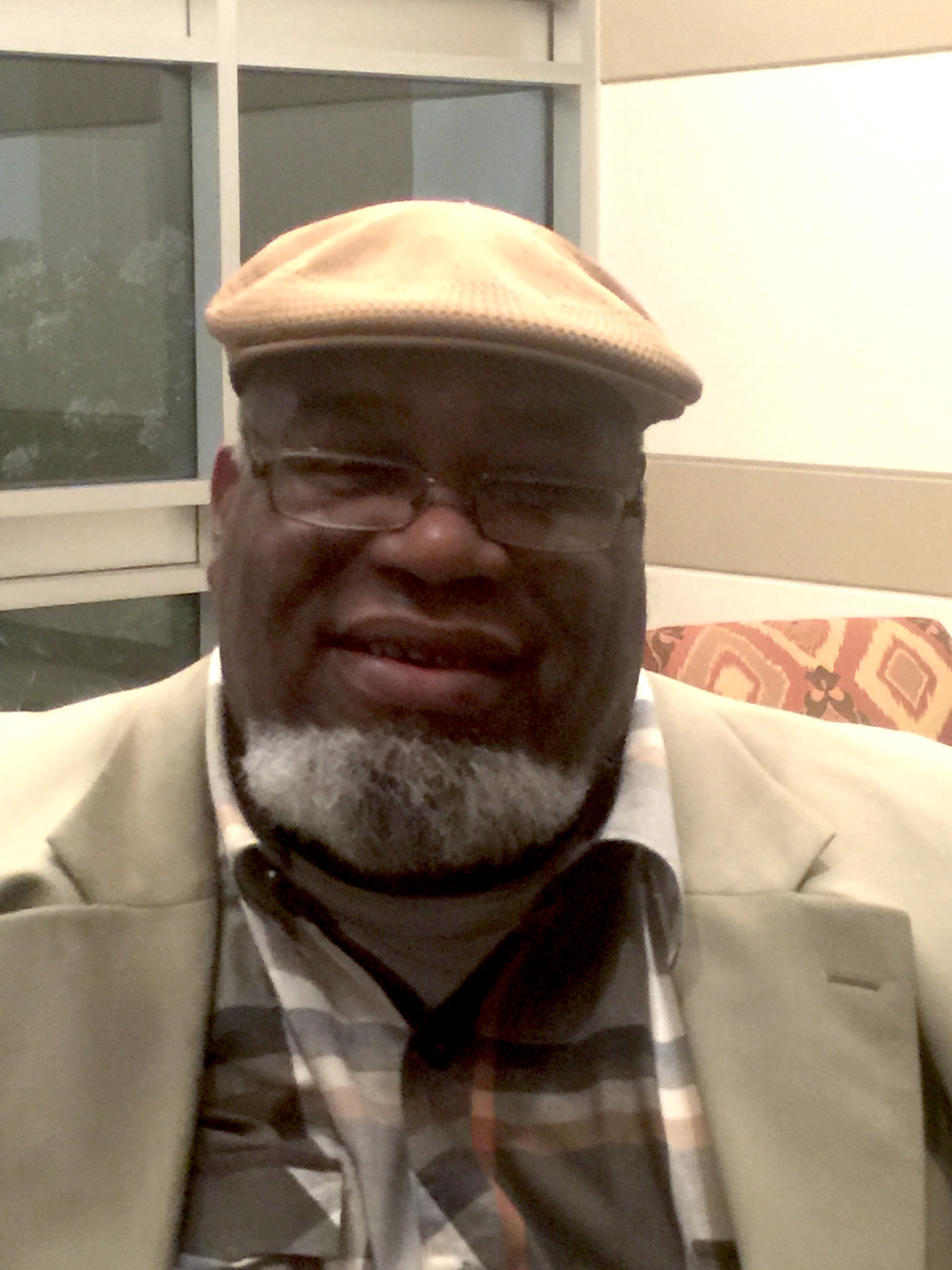
- Gay attending the GridIron Greats Hall of Fame 2015

No. 83, 79, 78
- Position: Defensive end

Personal information
- Born: May 28, 1955 (age 71); San Francisco, California, U.S.
- Listed height: 6 ft 5 in (1.96 m)
- Listed weight: 250 lb (113 kg)

Career information
- High school: Hoover (San Diego, California)
- College: Southern California
- NFL draft: 1978: 2nd round, 55th overall pick

Career history
- Detroit Lions (1978–1987); Minnesota Vikings (1988)

Awards and highlights
- 2× Second-team All-Pac-8 (1976, 1977)

Career NFL statistics
- Sacks: 60
- Interceptions: 2
- Games: 151
- Stats at Pro Football Reference

William Howard Gay (born May 28, 1955) is an American former professional football player who was a defensive end in the National Football League (NFL). He resides in Detroit, Michigan. Gay played in the NFL for the Detroit Lions (1978–1987) and the Minnesota Vikings (1988). He had 44.5 professional career quarterback sacks (60 unofficially). Gay was selected in the second round of the 1978 NFL draft by the Denver Broncos.

== Early life ==
Gay attended San Diego's Hoover High School, where he played football at defensive end and tight end.

== College career ==
Gay played college football at the University of Southern California. He transferred from San Diego City College. Gay was a member of 1976 Rose Bowl champion and 1975 Liberty Bowl champions. Gay was listed as the 1977 Consensus All American team.

== Professional career ==
=== Detroit Lions ===
Gay started his career as a tight end. The 6-foot-5-inch, 250-pounder was a second-round choice of the Denver Broncos in the 1978 draft. The Lions obtained him on August 14 of that year, in exchange for defensive back Charlie West and a 1979 sixth-round pick.

He ended his Lions career as a defensive end with what was, at the time, the second-highest sack total in franchise history – 5.5 in a game.

Gay rated number 89 of the top 100 Detroit Lions.

During the 1979 and 1980 seasons, Gay teamed with Al "Bubba" Baker, Doug English, Dave Pureifory, and John Woodcock to form the core of the Lions’ "Silver Rush" defensive line. Their 1978 squad recorded a team record 55 sacks, and their 1981 unit had 47, first and fifth, respectively, on the Lions’ all-time list.

=== Minnesota Vikings ===
Gay finished his career with the Minnesota Vikings in 1988.
