= Al Baker =

American gridiron football player (born 1956)

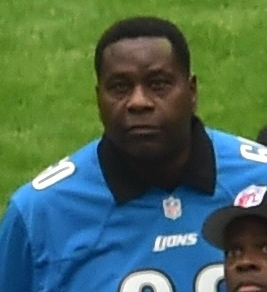
- Baker in 2014

No. 80, 60, 77
- Position: Defensive end

Personal information
- Born: December 9, 1956 (age 69); Jacksonville, Florida, U.S.
- Listed height: 6 ft 6 in (1.98 m)
- Listed weight: 260 lb (118 kg)

Career information
- High school: Weequahic (Newark, New Jersey)
- College: Colorado State
- NFL draft: 1978: 2nd round, 40th overall pick

Career history
- Detroit Lions (1978–1982); St. Louis Cardinals (1983–1986); Cleveland Browns (1987); Minnesota Vikings (1988); Cleveland Browns (1989–1990)

Awards and highlights
- NFL Defensive Rookie of the Year (1978); First-team All-Pro (1978); 3× Pro Bowl (1978–1980); 2× NFL sacks leader (1978, 1980); PFWA All-Rookie Team (1978); Detroit Lions 75th Anniversary Team; Detroit Lions All-Time Team; Unofficial NFL record: Most sacks in a season: 23 (Note: Tied with Myles Garrett)

Career NFL statistics
- Sacks: 131.0 (Note: 65.5 of his 131 career sacks are "official," since that category did not become official until 1982, Baker's fifth season))
- Interceptions: 4
- Fumble recoveries: 8
- Stats at Pro Football Reference

James Albert London Baker (born December 9, 1956), nicknamed "Bubba", is an American former professional football player who was a defensive end in the National Football League (NFL) from 1978 to 1990. He played college football for the Colorado State Rams. He was named to three Pro Bowls and was the NFL Defensive Rookie of the Year.

== Professional career ==
Baker, a graduate of Weequahic High School in Newark, New Jersey and Colorado State University, was selected in the second round of the 1978 NFL draft by the Detroit Lions. Listed as 6-6 and 250 pounds, he combined speed and strength.

He made his mark early as he recorded 23 sacks (an unofficial stat at that time) his rookie year, with five sacks in a single game against the Tampa Bay Buccaneers. He played for the Lions for five seasons, starting 66 of 67 games. In his last season with the Lions, 1982, when sacks became an official statistic, he totaled 8.5 in only nine games. He also had two career interceptions with the Lions. During his career with the Lions he unofficially totaled 75.5 sacks including a record 23 sacks in 1978, 16 in 1979, 18 in 1980 and 10 in 1981, which are the franchise's top three all-time, single-season sack efforts. It also ranks as one of the highest for the first five years of a player in football history. He was one of the anchors of the "Silver Rush", Detroit's defensive line from 1978 to 1982, which consisted of Baker, Doug English, William Gay, and Dave Pureifory; the group set the franchise record for sacks. In 2021, Baker was listed as the NFL's unofficial all-time single-season sack leader due to Pro Football Reference adding sack statistics from 1960 to 1981, the year before the stat became official. Baker recorded 23 sacks as a rookie in 1978 with the Detroit Lions, tying the official record of 23 sacks by Myles Garrett. He ranks among the NFL's career sack leaders, with 65.5 official and 131 unofficial sacks to make him one of 62 players in the "100 Sack Club".

A contract dispute had Baker sent to the St. Louis Cardinals in 1983. He had 13 sacks that season along with two interceptions. He had ten sacks the following year, had four in 1985 and then closed out 1986 with 10.5 sacks. In 1987, he was a reserve defense lineman for the Cleveland Browns, then served in the same position in 1988 for the Minnesota Vikings. He returned to the Browns as a starter for all 16 games of the 1989 season as well as for all nine games he played for the Browns in 1990, his final NFL season at age 34. When he retired, he had 130 sacks, sixth most in NFL history.

== Post-NFL career ==
Baker said in the NFL that he hoped to "play long enough to make a fortune in football. Then my son can be a doctor. He won't have to play this dumb game". Baker now lives with his family, including his wife of 34 years, Sabrina, in Avon, Ohio, a suburb of Cleveland, and he owned a restaurant called Bubba's Q World-famous Bar-B-Que & Catering in Avon, though the restaurant is no longer open.

He appeared on the ABC-TV show Shark Tank on December 6, 2013, in which investor and entrepreneur Daymond John agreed to invest $300,000 for a 30 percent share in Queen Ann Inc., the food company he and his children, Brittani and James, started. Part of the agreement was the licensing of Baker's patent for de-boning pork ribs. Bubba's-Q Boneless Baby Back Ribs have been sold at stores, online, and on QVC, and were featured on Good Morning America. In 2023, he spoke out about his perceived unfair treatment in the Shark Tank deal, for which he said he received only $659,653 in total, versus over $16 million in revenue, which had been promoted as one of the show's biggest successes. In a response, Daymond John stated that the Bakers' take, approximately 4% of revenue, came from the very thin profit margins of the food industry, and claimed that he had suffered a net loss on their arrangement. He later filed suit against the Bakers for their social media campaign, claiming that it had damaged his reputation and cost him speaking engagements.

A federal judge found that the Bakers had violated a 2019 settlement and in June granted John a preliminary injunction and restraining order against the Bakers, preventing them from publishing disparaging remarks about their business relationship, and requiring that they take down previously posted content. The injunction and restraining order were reviewed and became permanent in July.

== Awards and honors ==
- Three-time Pro Bowl selection
- 1978 NFL Defensive Rookie of the Year
- Cleveland Sports Hall of Fame (class of 2007)
- Six-time Cleveland Magazine Silver Spoon Award winner – Best Restaurant (for Bubba's Q)
