= Dan Wagoner =

American football player (1959–1997)

No. 34, 36
- Position: Defensive back

Personal information
- Born: December 12, 1959; High Point, North Carolina, U.S.
- Listed height: 5 ft 10 in (1.78 m)
- Listed weight: 180 lb (82 kg)

Career information
- High school: T. Wingate Andrews (High Point)
- College: Kansas
- NFL draft: 1982: 9th round, 231st overall pick

Career history
- Detroit Lions (1982–1984); Minnesota Vikings (1984); Atlanta Falcons (1985)

Career NFL statistics
- Fumble recoveries: 1
- Stats at Pro Football Reference

Daniel Wright Wagoner (born December 12, 1959) was an American professional football player who was a defensive back in the National Football League (NFL). He played for the Detroit Lions from 1982 to 1984, Minnesota Vikings in 1984, and Atlanta Falcons in 1985. He played college football for the Kansas Jayhawks.
