= Roosevelt Barnes (American football) =

American football and basketball player (born 1958)

No. 54
- Position: Linebacker

Personal information
- Born: August 3, 1958 (age 68); Fort Wayne, Indiana, U.S.
- Listed height: 6 ft 2 in (1.88 m)
- Listed weight: 224 lb (102 kg)

Career information
- High school: Wayne
- College: Purdue
- NFL draft: 1982: 10th round, 266th overall pick

Career history
- Detroit Lions (1982–1985); Indianapolis Colts (1986)*
- * Offseason or practice squad member only

Career NFL statistics
- Sacks: 1
- Interceptions: 3
- Fumble recoveries: 2
- Stats at Pro Football Reference

Roosevelt Barnes Jr. (born August 3, 1958) is an American former professional football player who was a linebacker for the Detroit Lions of the National Football League (NFL) and a current sports agent. He played three sports at Purdue University—football, basketball, and baseball. While he was most noted as a football player, he also enjoyed significant success in basketball, playing on Purdue's 1980 Final Four team. After retiring from professional football, in 1987 Barnes became a partner and contract advisor with Maximum Sports Management. He has negotiated contracts for Laveranues Coles, Walter Jones, Ray Lewis, Ndamukong Suh, Roman Oben, and Andre Wadsworth among others.

== High school ==
Barnes attended Wayne High School in Fort Wayne. As a junior, he led his team to the SAC conference title, and the Generals also won their first sectional championship. As a senior, the team repeated, winning the school's second sectional title.

As reported in the Wayne Generals 2009–10 Winter Athletic Program, Barnes' high-school career resulted in the following awards and Wayne High School accomplishments:

- Boys' Basketball Individual Records:
  - most career points scored (1304 points)
  - highest career scoring average (18.6ppg)
  - 2nd best career assists record (439 assists)
  - 2nd best single-season scoring record (509 points, 1975/76)
  - 3rd best single-season assists record (212 assists, 1975/76)
- Boys' Basketball Team Records:
  - best single-season team record (20–3, .870, 1976/77)
  - 2nd best single-season team record (20–6, .769, 1975/76)
  - highest single-season team offensive average (72.9ppg, 1976/77)
- Awards Received:
  - 3-time basketball All-SAC selection (1974/75, 1975/76, 1976/77)
  - Indiana basketball All-Star team selection (1976/77)

== College career ==
After his success in high school, Barnes attended Purdue University on a basketball scholarship. At Purdue, Barnes demonstrated his athletic diversity by playing on the varsity basketball (4 years), football (1 year) and baseball (1 year) teams. After Purdue, Barnes continued his football career as a 10th-round draft pick of the Detroit Lions in the 1982 NFL Draft.

== Personal life ==
Barnes has four children in all—three biological and one adopted. His adopted son, Caleb Swanigan (1997–2022), was a 1st-round NBA draft pick (26th overall) for the Portland Trail Blazers, and played basketball at Purdue. Barnes also serves as an AAU basketball coach.
