= Martin Moss (businessman) =

Martin Grenville Moss, CBE, (1923–2007) was managing director of now-demolished Knightsbridge department store Woollands for twelve years, turning Knightsbridge into a fashionable shopping location. Moss was educated at Lancing College, Sussex, and served during the Second World War as a fighter pilot. After the war, Moss married the photographer Jane Bown CBE and was promoted to managing director of Woollands in 1954. He is credited with reviving the store's fortunes. He was hailed for his achievements as "London's one-man wave of fashion" by the New York magazine Women's Wear Daily.

In 1966, Moss left Woollands to work as managing director for Simpsons in Piccadilly. He spent some time as chairman and chief executive of the US May Department Stores International. In 1985 he became director of the retail wing of the National Trust. He was a member of the Design Council from 1964 to 1975 and on the council of the Royal Society of Arts from 1977 to 1994.

In 1975, Moss was awarded the post of Commander of the Order of the British Empire for services to design and industry. He died on 17 November 2007.
