= Martin Mittag =

German politician (born 1982)

Member of the Landtag of Bavaria
- Incumbent
- Assumed office 5 November 2018
- Preceded by: Jürgen W. Heike
- Constituency: Coburg

Personal details
- Born: 3 March 1982 (age 44)
- Party: Christian Social Union (since 2001)

Martin Mittag (born 3 March 1982) is a German politician serving as a member of the Landtag of Bavaria since 2018. He has served as chairman of the Christian Social Union in Coburg since 2015. From 2014 to 2018, he served as mayor of Seßlach.
