= Steve Doig =

American football player (born 1960)

No. 58, 59
- Position: Linebacker

Personal information
- Born: March 28, 1960 (age 66); Melrose, Massachusetts, U.S.
- Listed height: 6 ft 2 in (1.88 m)
- Listed weight: 240 lb (109 kg)

Career information
- High school: North Reading (North Reading, Massachusetts)
- College: New Hampshire
- NFL draft: 1982: 3rd round, 69th overall pick

Career history
- Detroit Lions (1982–1984); New England Patriots (1986–1987); Los Angeles Raiders (1988)*
- * Offseason or practice squad member only

Career NFL statistics
- Fumble recoveries: 1
- Stats at Pro Football Reference

Stephen Gugel Doig (born March 28, 1960) is an American former professional football player in the National Football League (NFL) for the Detroit Lions from 1982 to 1984 and the New England Patriots from 1986 to 1987. He was selected by the Lions in the third round of the 1982 NFL draft out of the University of New Hampshire. While attending North Reading High School, he was also a hockey player.

Doig was the ECAC Player of the Year and Yankee Conference Player of the Year. He was the Defensive Captain in the Blue–Gray Bowl. He played in nine games for the Detroit Lions in 1982 and in nine games in 1983. Doig had 17 solo tackles and two assists in sixteen games for the Detroit Lions in 1984. He did not play professional football in 1985.

Doig was signed as a free agent by the New England Patriots in 1986 and played in five games, recorded 1 solo tackle and recovered a fumble by Andra Franklin on his kickoff return in the Patriots' 34–27 win over the Miami Dolphins on December 22, 1986. He played in one regular season game for the New England Patriots in the 1987 season and in their playoff game on January 4, 1987. He wore uniform #59 for the New England Patriots.
