= Al Latimer =

American football player (born 1957)

No. 29, 43
- Position: Cornerback

Personal information
- Born: October 14, 1957 (age 69); Winter Park, Florida, U.S.
- Listed height: 5 ft 11 in (1.80 m)
- Listed weight: 176 lb (80 kg)

Career information
- High school: Lyman (Longwood, Florida)
- College: Ferrum (1975–1976); Clemson (1977–1978)
- NFL draft: 1979: undrafted

Career history
- Philadelphia Eagles (1979–1980); Winnipeg Blue Bombers (1981)*; San Francisco 49ers (1980); Detroit Lions (1982–1984)
- * Offseason or practice squad member only

Career NFL statistics
- Interceptions: 1
- Fumble recoveries: 1
- Stats at Pro Football Reference

Albert Latimer (born October 14, 1957) is an American former professional football player who was a cornerback for four seasons in the National Football League (NFL) with the Philadelphia Eagles and Detroit Lions. He played college football for the Ferrum Panthers and Clemson Tigers.

== Early life ==
Albert Latimer was born on October 14, 1957, in Winter Park, Florida. He attended Lyman High School in Longwood, Florida.

== College career ==
Latimer first played college football at Ferrum College from 1975 to 1976 and was a two-year starter. He also participated in track and field at Ferrum. He then transferred to Clemson University and was a member of the Tigers from 1977 to 1978 and a letterman in 1978. Latimer was inducted into Ferrum College's athletics hall of fame in 2004.

== Professional career ==
After going undrafted in the 1979 NFL draft, Latimer signed with the Philadelphia Eagles on May 8, 1979. He played in 13 games for the Eagles during his rookie year in 1979 before being placed on injured reserve on November 28, 1979. He was placed on injured reserve again the next year on August 19, 1980, before being released on October 7, 1980.

Latimer was signed by the San Francisco 49ers on October 29, 1980. He did not appear in any games for the 49ers and was released on November 8, 1980.

Latimer was a member of the Winnipeg Blue Bombers of the Canadian Football League (CFL) in 1981. He was released in late June 1981, before the start of the 1981 CFL season.

Latimer signed with the Detroit Lions on July 5, 1982. He was placed on injured reserve on August 30. He was later activated on December 1 and played in four games, starting two, for the Lions during the 1982 season. He also started one playoff game that year. Latimer started the first eight games of the 1983 season, recording one interception, before being placed on injured reserve on October 27, 1983. He appeared in 15 games in 1984, recovering one fumble. Latimer was released by the Lions on August 22, 1985.
