= Martin Moss (American football) =

American football player (born 1958)

No. 63
- Position: Defensive end

Personal information
- Born: December 16, 1958 (age 67); San Diego, California, U.S.
- Listed height: 6 ft 4 in (1.93 m)
- Listed weight: 250 lb (113 kg)

Career information
- High school: Lincoln (San Diego)
- College: UCLA
- NFL draft: 1982: 8th round, 208th overall pick

Career history
- Detroit Lions (1982–1985)

Career NFL statistics
- Sacks: 0.5
- Stats at Pro Football Reference

Martin Moss (born December 16, 1958) is an American former professional football player who was a defensive end for the Detroit Lions of the National Football League (NFL) from 1982 to 1985. He played college football for the UCLA Bruins.
