= 1979 Cincinnati Bengals season =

NFL team season

- General manager: Paul Brown
- Head coach: Homer Rice
- Home stadium: Riverfront Stadium

Results
- Record: 4–12
- Division place: 4th AFC Central
- Playoffs: Did not qualify

The 1979 Cincinnati Bengals season was the franchise's 10th season in the National Football League, and the 12th overall. Fullback Pete Johnson powered his way to 15 touchdowns, but the Bengals struggled to their second straight 4–12 record. After the season, former Cleveland coach Forrest Gregg was named to replace Homer Rice as Bengals head coach. 1979 marked the end of an era, as the last remaining original Bengal, longtime center Bob Johnson, retired after 12 seasons, 2 in the AFL, and 10 in the NFL, all with the Bengals.

== Offseason ==
=== NFL draft ===
1979 Cincinnati Bengals draft
Round	Pick	Player	Position	College	Notes
1	3	Jack Thompson	Quarterback	Washington State	
1	12	Charles Alexander	Running back	LSU	
2	30	Dan Ross *	Tight end	Northeastern	
3	59	Barney Cotton	Guard	Nebraska	
4	84	Mike White	Defensive tackle	Albany State	
4	91	Vaughn Lusby	Defensive back	Arkansas	
5	113	Casey Merrill	Defensive end	UC Davis	
6	139	Steve Kreider	Wide receiver	Lehigh	
7	168	Max Montoya *	Guard	UCLA	
8	194	Howie Kurnick	Linebacker	Cincinnati	
9	223	Scott Burk	Defensive back	Oklahoma State	
10	250	Nathan Poole	Running back	Louisville	
11	278	Ken Bungarda	Offensive tackle	Missouri	
12	304	Jim Browner	Defensive back	Notre Dame	
Made roster * Made at least one Pro Bowl during career

== Personnel ==
=== Staff / Coaches ===
1979 Cincinnati Bengals staff
Front office: President – John Sawyer; General Manager – Paul Brown; Director of Player Personnel – Pete Brown; Head coaches: Head Coach – Homer Rice; Offensive coaches: Offensive Backfield – George Sefcik; Receivers – Boyd Dowler; Offensive Line – Mike McCormack	Defensive coaches: Defensive Coordinator/Linebackers – Howard Brinker; Defensive Line – Dick Modzelewski; Defensive Backfield – Charley Winner; Special teams coaches: Special Teams – Frank Gansz; Strength and conditioning: Strength – Kim Wood

=== Roster ===
1979 Cincinnati Bengals roster
Quarterbacks (QB): 14 Ken Anderson; 12 Jack Thompson; Running backs (RB): 40 Charles Alexander; 45 Archie Griffin; 46 Pete Johnson; 35 Nathan Poole; 22 Deacon Turner; Wide receivers (WR): 84 Don Bass; 85 Isaac Curtis; 86 Steve Kreider; 88 Mike Levenseller; Tight ends (TE): 81 Jim Corbett; 89 Dan Ross; 88 Rick Walker	Offensive linemen (OL): 74 Glenn Bujnoch G; 58 Blair Bush C; 70 Barney Cotton G; 66 Mark Donahue G; 76 Vernon Holland T; 54 Bob Johnson C; 62 Dave Lapham G/C; 65 Max Montoya G/T; 77 Mike Wilson T; Defensive linemen (DL): 79 Ross Browner DE; 67 Gary Burley DE; 73 Eddie Edwards DT; 72 Mack Mitchell DE; 63 Mike White DT; 75 Wilson Whitley DT	Linebackers (LB): 50 Glenn Cameron OLB; 52 Tom Dinkel OLB; 53 Bo Harris OLB; 59 Howard Kurnick OLB; 55 Jim LeClair MLB; 51 Tom Ruud OLB; Defensive backs (DB): 21 Jim Browner SS; 28 Scott Burk SS; 24 Marvin Cobb CB/S; 29 Vaughn Lusby CB; 44 Ray Griffin CB; 30 Dick Jauron FS; 32 Scott Perry FS; 13 Ken Riley CB; Special teams (ST): 10 Chris Bahr K; 87 Pat McInally P	Practice squad: None - Vacant; Reserve: 34 Louis Breeden CB (IR); 82 Billy Brooks WR (IR); 57 Reggie Williams LB (IR); Rookies in italics 45 active, 3 reserve, 0 practice squad

== Regular season ==
=== Schedule ===
Week	Date	Opponent	Result	Record	Venue	Attendance
1	September 2	at Denver Broncos	**L** 0–10	0–1	Mile High Stadium	74,788
2	September 9	at Buffalo Bills	**L** 24–51	0–2	Rich Stadium	43,504
3	September 16	New England Patriots	**L** 14–20	0–3	Riverfront Stadium	41,805
4	September 23	**Houston Oilers**	**L** 27–30	0–4	Riverfront Stadium	45,615
5	September 30	at Dallas Cowboys	**L** 13–38	0–5	Texas Stadium	63,179
6	October 7	Kansas City Chiefs	**L** 7–10	0–6	Riverfront Stadium	40,041
7	October 14	**Pittsburgh Steelers**	**W** 34–10	1–6	Riverfront Stadium	52,381
8	October 21	at **Cleveland Browns**	**L** 27–28	1–7	Cleveland Municipal Stadium	75,119
9	October 28	Philadelphia Eagles	**W** 37–13	2–7	Riverfront Stadium	42,036
10	November 4	at Baltimore Colts	**L** 28–38	2–8	Municipal Stadium	37,740
11	November 11	San Diego Chargers	**L** 24–26	2–9	Riverfront Stadium	40,782
12	November 18	at **Houston Oilers**	**L** 21–42	2–10	Astrodome	49,829
13	November 25	St. Louis Cardinals	**W** 34–28	3–10	Riverfront Stadium	25,103
14	December 2	at **Pittsburgh Steelers**	**L** 17–37	3–11	Three Rivers Stadium	46,521
15	December 9	at Washington Redskins	**L** 14–28	3–12	RFK Stadium	52,882
16	December 16	**Cleveland Browns**	**W** 16–12	4–12	Riverfront Stadium	42,183
Note: Intra-division opponents are in **bold** text.

=== Standings ===
AFC Central
	W	L	T	PCT	DIV	CONF	PF	PA	STK
^{(2)} Pittsburgh Steelers	12	4	0	.750	4–2	9–3	416	262	W1
^{(4)} Houston Oilers	11	5	0	.688	4–2	9–3	362	331	L1
Cleveland Browns	9	7	0	.563	2–4	6–6	359	352	L2
Cincinnati Bengals	4	12	0	.250	2–4	2–10	337	421	W1
