= Browner =

Browner is an English surname. Notable people with the surname include:

- Brandon Browner (born 1984), American football cornerback
- Carol Browner (born 1955), American environmentalist
- Joey Browner (1960–2026), American football safety
- Keith Browner (1962–2025), American football defensive end
- Keith Browner Jr. (born 1988), American football defensive end
- Ross Browner (1954–2022), American football defensive end
