= List of NFL players with chronic traumatic encephalopathy =

Chronic traumatic encephalopathy (CTE) is a degenerative brain disease linked to repeated head impacts. It has been found in 345 of 376 deceased former National Football League (NFL) players whose brains were donated for study, according to a 2023 report by the Boston University CTE Center — a self-selected group whose families often suspected symptoms before death. Among all former players who died between 2016 and 2021, at least one in four had CTE, though the true rate may be much higher. In comparison, a 2018 BU study of the general population found one CTE case in 164 autopsies, and the one person with CTE had played college football. The NFL acknowledged a link between playing American football and being diagnosed with CTE in 2016, after denying such a link for over a decade and arguing that players’ symptoms had other causes.

While much attention in the NFL has focused on limiting or treating concussions, the latest medical research indicates that the brain damage in CTE is caused by the cumulative impact of all collisions involving a player's head, which confirms what was generally known nearly a century ago but was then largely forgotten. The NFL has implemented rule changes to reduce collisions to the head and has sought to improve football helmet design. Critics respond that significant head trauma is inevitable for bigger, faster players in tackle football and that helmets are of limited use in preventing a player's brain from crashing into their skull, which is the cause of the brain damage that leads to CTE.

As more parents (including some NFL players) decide not to let their children play football, it remains to be seen whether football will eventually face a significant decline in popularity like boxing, which fell from prominence as the brain damage suffered by ex-boxers drew more public attention. As of 2023 football is the most-watched sport in the U.S. by a substantial margin while basketball is the most-played sport.

== CTE's effects on players ==
Although the symptoms of CTE can vary, it doesn't directly cause death but instead changes personality and behavior, making a person not feel like themselves anymore. Players with CTE can become isolated from their friends. Sometimes they become unable to tell a story, carry on a conversation, or recognize their loved ones. One former player later found to have CTE described having headaches that felt like ice picks hitting his brain.

Some former players with CTE suffer from memory loss and depression. Some players and those around them deal with their violent mood swings, rage, and paranoia. In some cases, damage to players' brains contributes to severe alcoholism leading to death. Two former NFL Man of the Year winners suffering from CTE symptoms have committed suicide by shooting themselves in the chest, with the intent of leaving their brains intact to be studied for the damage inflicted by football.

Heisman Trophy winner and former NFL All-Pro Bo Jackson said in a 2017 interview with USA Today that if he had known about the risks associated with CTE, he would never have played football, and he discourages his children from doing so. In late 2017, former running back Larry Johnson, who holds the NFL record for most rushing attempts in a season, reported having symptoms akin to Aaron Hernandez, including memory blanks, suicidal thoughts and thoughts of committing violent acts. Although there is no way to positively diagnose CTE before death, Johnson believes he is living with it.

The CEO of the Concussion Legacy Foundation states that "[l]ater stage CTE (stage 3 and 4) is associated with dementia, but early-stage CTE (stage 1 and 2) is more associated with what is called neurobehavioral dysregulation, which includes violent, impulsive, or explosive behavior, inappropriate behavior, aggression, rage, 'short fuse,' and lack of behavioral control."

Each year of playing tackle football increases a player's risk of developing CTE by 30 percent. Family members and friends frequently struggle to try and provide care for former players with CTE, while the NFL has been criticized for not following through on its limited promises and not using basic tests to identify dementia in former players for its legal settlement.

== List ==
=== Deceased players with CTE confirmed post-mortem ===
A common definitive test currently can be made only by examining the brain tissue of a deceased victim. In a 2023 study, 345 of 376 NFL players whose brains have been autopsied had CTE.

As the vast majority of deceased former players never have specialized autopsies done on their brains—the first such autopsy was not performed until 2002, and the families of most deceased players keep their autopsy results private—the following list shows a small fraction of NFL players who have had CTE. The age listed to the right of many players' names is when their CTE symptoms began, as indicated in the referenced sources, although in some cases symptoms could have begun earlier.

- Ray Abruzzese
- Phillip Adams – CTE symptoms began in his early 30s
- Kenneth Adamson
- George Andrie
- Mark Arneson – late 60s
- Rick Arrington
- Chuck Arrobio – early 70s
- George Atkinson
- George Atkinson III – 20s
- Maxie Baughan
- Terry Beasley
- Dave Behrman
- Jovan Belcher – mid 20s
- Al Bemiller – mid 70s
- Wes Bender – mid 40s
- Jeff Blackshear – mid 30s
- Forrest Blue – early 50s
- Dorian Boose – early 40s
- Daniel Brabham
- Colt Brennan – mid 30s
- Curtis Brown – 50s
- John Bruhin
- Nick Buoniconti – early 70s
- Lew Carpenter
- Howard Carson – late 50s
- Howard "Hopalong" Cassady – late 60s
- Ronnie Caveness
- Henry Childs
- Greg Clark – late 40s
- Daniel Colchico
- Paul Crane
- Lou Creekmur – early 50s
- Bobby Crespino – late 50s
- Chuck Crist
- Irv Cross – late 70s
- Doug Cunningham
- Art DeCarlo
- Willie Daniel – mid 60s
- George Darrah – late 60s
- Fred Dean
- Tom DeLeone
- Bill Demory
- Taylor Dever – mid 20s
- Conrad Dobler
- David Drachman – around 50
- Shane Dronett – mid 30s
- Dave Duerson – mid 40s
- Pete Duranko
- Ray Easterling – mid 40s
- Chris Eitzmann – late 30s
- Kevin Ellison – late 20s
- James Evans
- Mel Farr
- Grant Feasel
- Gene Felker
- Cullen Finnerty – late 20s
- Danny Fulton
- Frank Gifford
- Daren Gilbert
- Cookie Gilchrist – late 30s
- Nesby Glasgow
- John Grimsley – around 40
- Jason Hairston – mid 40s
- Darryl Hammond
- Carlton Haselrig – early 50s
- Rip Hawkins
- Steve Heimkreiter
- Chris Henry – mid 20s
- Aaron Hernandez – mid 20s
- Wally Hilgenberg
- John Hilton
- Glen Ray Hines – mid 30s
- Nate Hobgood-Chittick – early 40s
- Paul Hornung
- Jim Houston – early 50s
- Jim Hudson
- Claude Humphrey
- Gerry Huth
- Vincent Jackson – mid 30s
- Lionel James – mid 50s
- Darrius Johnson – early 50s
- John Henry Johnson – 50s
- Ron Johnson Sr.
- Vaughan Johnson – late 40s
- Terry Joyce
- Tom Keating
- Jim Kiick – mid 60s
- Marshawn Kneeland – mid 20s
- Bob Kuechenberg
- Frank LeMaster
- Bill Lenkaitis
- Greg Lens
- Terry Long – mid 40s
- Edward Lothamer – early 60s
- Jim Lynch
- Rob Lytle
- Charles Mackey – early 70s
- John Mackey – late 50s
- Greg Marx
- Ollie Matson
- Keith McCants
- Tommy McDonald
- Keli McGregor
- Tom McHale – mid 40s
- Kenny McKinley – early 20s
- Steve McMichael
- Fred McNeill – mid 40s
- Earl Morrall
- Larry Morris – mid 40s
- Mercury Morris
- Guy Morriss – early 60s
- Tommy Nobis
- Joe O'Malley
- Paul Oliver – late 20s
- Chuck Osborne – mid 30s
- Don Paul
- Ray Perkins – mid 70s
- Joe Perry – early 70s
- Richard Pickens
- Cyril Pinder
- Mike Pitts
- Mike Pyle
- Bob Riley
- Isiah Robertson
- Adrian Robinson – mid 20s
- Rocky Rosema
- Scott Ross – mid 30s
- Max Runager
- Tyler Sash – mid 20s
- Eric Scoggins
- Clyde Scott – 80s
- Jake Scott – late 60s
- Junior Seau – early 40s
- Bubba Smith
- Joey Smith Sr. – early 50s
- Steve Smith
- Robert Sowell
- Ken Stabler – mid 60s
- Jeff Staggs – mid 60s
- Bill Stanfill
- Justin Strzelczyk – mid 30s
- Jerry Sturm
- Pat Sullivan – mid 50s
- Mosi Tatupu
- Daniel Te'o-Nesheim – late 20s
- Demaryius Thomas – early 30s
- Bill Troup – early 60s
- Max Tuerk – mid 20s
- Kevin Turner – mid 40s
- Tommy Vaughn
- Frank Wainright – early 40s
- Fulton Walker – early 50s
- Andre Waters – mid 40s
- Cornell Webster
- Mike Webster – late 30s
- Jim Welch
- Ralph Wenzel – early 50s
- Charles White – mid 30s
- Jesse Whittenton
- John Wilbur
- Ben Williams – mid 30s
- Stanley Wilson Jr.
- Jeff Winans – early 50s
- Dennis Wirgowski – early 50s
- Willie Wood – late 60s
- Frank Wycheck – mid 30s
- Roger Zatkoff

=== Deceased players suspected of having had CTE ===
Included in the list are players diagnosed with amyotrophic lateral sclerosis (ALS) who were never tested post-mortem for CTE but whose history appears consistent with CTE. A typical diagnosis of ALS has primarily been based on the symptoms and signs the physician observes in the patient and a series of tests to rule out other diseases and therefore, prior to the discovery of CTE as a phenomenon in ex-American football players, many CTE cases were diagnosed as ALS. CTE has also been linked to increased rates of Parkinsonism. After CTE was first diagnosed in 2002 in the brain tissue of Mike Webster, brain donation for specialized autopsies to check for CTE have become more available.

A cohort mortality study run by the National Institute for Occupational Safety and Health (NIOSH) examined 3,349 NFL players who played at least five full seasons from 1959 to 1988. Findings showed that while NFL players lived longer than the average American male — although that could be due to the correlation between income and life expectancy in the U.S. — the risk of death associated with neurodegenerative disorders was about three times higher among the NFL cohort. The risk for death from Alzheimer's disease and ALS were about four times higher among the NFL cohort.

- Marion Barber III
- Al Bemiller
- Matt Blair
- Steve Bowman
- Timothy Brown
- Chris Brymer
- Dennis Byrd
- Dwight Clark
- Mike Curtis
- Tom Dempsey
- Jordan Devey
- Glenn Foster
- John Frechette
- Jesse Freitas Jr.
- Wayne Hawkins
- Dave Herman
- Gene Hickerson
- Dennis Homan
- Harry Jacobs
- Derrick Jensen
- Joe Kapp
- Steve Kiner
- Dave Kocourek
- Dick "Night Train" Lane
- Jim LeClair
- Tony Liscio
- David Lunceford
- Doug Martin
- Tom Matte
- Ralph Neely
- Dick Nolan
- Jim Norton
- Bill Pellington
- Jim Ringo
- Frank Ryan
- Gale Sayers
- Don Shinnick
- O.J. Simpson
- Aldon Smith
- Shevin Smith
- Art Spinney
- Milt Sunde
- Orlando Thomas
- Jim Tyrer
- David Walters
- Stanley Wilson Jr.

=== Living former players diagnosed with CTE or ALS or reporting symptoms consistent with CTE or ALS ===
These players have publicly acknowledged either having been diagnosed with likely CTE or having experienced symptoms, such as dementia or unusual memory loss, consistent with CTE but that could have other causes or CTE could be one of a combination of causes. For example, ex-players that have presented with symptoms late in life may have other forms of age-related dementia. In some cases, the player has received a diagnosis of ALS, but their symptoms are consistent with CTE.

Around 4,500 players brought multiple lawsuits against the NFL alleging that it had covered up a growing body of medical evidence about the preponderance of head-trauma related CTE in ex-NFL players, and some testimonials have come in that context.

At present, there is no definitive CTE test available for living people in 2026

. The age listed to the right of many players' names is when their symptoms that possibly indicate CTE began, as provided in the referenced sources, although in some cases symptoms could have begun earlier.

- Mike Adamle
- Justin Bannan – late 30s
- Brent Boyd
- Lance Briggs – mid 30s
- Antonio Brown
- George Buehler
- Artie Burns – early 20s
- Barney Bussey
- Harry Carson
- Wayne Clark
- Jarrod Cooper – mid 30s
- Tom Crabtree – late 20s
- Jay Cutler – late 30s
- Joe DeLamielleure
- Eric Dickerson
- Tony Dorsett – mid 50s
- Mark Duper
- Keilen Dykes – mid 30s
- Boomer Esiason
- Brett Favre – mid 40s
- David Fulcher – mid 40s
- Tony Gaiter – early 40s
- Charlie Garner – mid 40s
- Mark Gastineau – early 60s
- Steve Gleason
- Andrew Glover
- Tim Green – late 40s
- Everson Griffen – late 20s
- Dwight Harrison
- Robert Jackson
- Roger Jackson – late 50s
- Larry Johnson – late 30s
- Ted Johnson – mid 40s
- Derek Kennard – mid 50s
- Emmanuel King
- Bernie Kosar – late 30s
- Erik Kramer
- Fulton Kuykendall
- Lamar Lathon – mid 40s
- Dorsey Levens
- Jamal Lewis – early 30s
- Mark Maddox – late 40s
- Leonard Marshall
- Mike Martin – early 50s
- Ricardo McDonald
- Le'Ron McClain – mid 30s
- Jim McMahon – early 50s
- Joe Namath
- Michael Oher – early 30s
- Frank Orgel
- Dave Pear – 40s
- Gerald Perry
- William "The Refrigerator" Perry – late 50s
- Jim Plunkett
- Antwaan Randle El
- Howard Richards – mid 50s
- John Rienstra – mid 50s
- George Rogers
- Reggie Rucker – late 40s
- Mark Rypien – mid 50s
- Warren Sapp
- Art Schlichter – early 50s
- Tim Shaw – early 30s
- Sam Shields – late 20s
- Ryan Stewart – late 20s
- Tyronne Stowe – early 50s
- Darryl Talley
- Joe Thomas – early 30s
- Thurman Thomas – mid 40s
- Art Thoms
- Godwin Turk
- Kyle Turley – mid 30s
- Zack Walz – early 40s
- Ed White
- Mitch White
- Reggie Williams
- Kellen Winslow II
- Titus Young – late 20s

=== Former players listed as plaintiffs in lawsuits against the NFL for brain injuries suffered while playing ===
After multiple lawsuits and many years of litigation, the NFL and lawyers for around 4,500 former players (or their estates) announced a financial settlement of $765 million in 2013. The list below currently contains fewer than half of those players.

The NFL was heavily criticized when it became known that race norming, which assumed that black players started with lower cognitive levels than white players, was being used in determining whether players qualified for help in the initial years of the settlement. The parties to the settlement discontinued the use of race norming in June 2021.

More recently, many players and their families have complained of being unfairly denied benefits under the settlement. Although the settlement's terms require that the latest medical tests be used to diagnose mental impairment, basic imaging tests are not paid for, saving "the NFL tens of millions in medical costs alone". As one neuroradiologist said, “If you're trying to find dementia in the last 10 or 15 years and you're not using imaging, you're not really trying that hard.”

- Khalid Abdullah
- Robert Abraham
- Sid Abramowitz
- Bobby E. Abrams Jr.
- Ron Acks
- Tony Adams
- George Adams
- Henry Adams
- Keith Adams
- Robert Adams
- Scott Adams
- Vashone Adams
- Margene Adkins
- Louie Aguiar
- Chidi Ahanotu
- David Ahrens
- Samaji Akili
- Ethan Albright
- Arnold Ale
- Charles Alexander Jr.
- David Alexander
- Roc Alexander
- Vernest Alexander
- Eric Allen
- Dalva Allen
- Terry T. Allen
- James Althoff
- Martin Amsler
- Michael Andersen
- Alfred Anderson
- Donny Anderson
- Erick Anderson
- Fred Anderson
- Garry (Donny) Anderson
- Jamal Anderson
- Kim Anderson
- Ottis Anderson
- Richard Anderson
- Roger Anderson III
- Charles Anthony
- Cornelius Anthony
- Reidel Anthony
- Lionel Antoine
- Shellye Archambeau
- Jojuan Armour
- Harvey Armstrong
- Richard Arndt
- Mark Arneson
- Jon Arnett
- James Arnold
- Joseph Aska Jr.
- Peter Athas
- Mike Augustyniak
- William Austin
- Reginald Austin
- Robert Avellini
- John Avery
- Steve Baack
- Charlie Babb
- Robert Babich
- Curtis Baham
- Elmer Bailey
- Karsten Bailey
- Mario Bailey
- Robert Bailey
- William Bain
- Jame Baisleys Jr.
- Ralph Baker
- Brian Baldinger
- Gary Baldinger
- Richard Baldinger
- Sam Ball
- John Banaszak
- Fred Ray Banks
- Mike Banks
- Michael Bankston
- Warren Bankston
- Gary Barbaro
- Christopher Barber
- Roy Barker
- Jerome Barkum
- Kevan Barlow
- Reggie Barlow
- Allen Barnes
- Billy Ray Barnes
- Jeff Barnes
- Larry Barnes
- Lew Barnes
- Fred Barnett
- Timothy Barnett
- Lemuel Barney
- Steve Bartkowski
- James Barton
- Brian Baschnagel
- Idress Bashir
- Mike Bass
- Eric Bassey
- Larry Bates
- Patrick Bates
- Michael Batiste
- Marco Battaglia
- James Battle
- Steve Baumgartner
- Aaron Beasley
- Derrick Beasley
- Terry Beasley
- Doug Beaudoin
- Jeff Beaver
- Aubrey Beavers
- Brett Bech
- Kurt Becker
- Rogers Beckett
- Don Beebe
- Thomas Beer
- Monty Beisel
- Anthony Bell
- Billy Bell
- Robert Bell
- Bruce Bell
- Edward Bell
- Grantis Bell
- Ken Bell
- Nickolas Bell
- Rodney Bellinger
- Donnell Bennett
- Woody Bennett
- Charles Benson
- Mitchell Benson
- Troy Benson
- Pete Bercich
- Bob Berry
- Gary Berry
- Sean Berton
- Don Bessillieu
- Eric Beverly
- Richard Bielski
- Keith Biggers
- Guy Bingham
- Ryon Bingham
- Joseph Biscaha
- Bill Bishop
- Harold Bishop
- Ken Blackman
- Lyle Blackwood
- Lyle Blackwood Jr.
- Willie Blade
- Brian Blades
- Horatio Blades
- Robert Blanchard
- Scott Blanton
- Anthony Blaylock
- Michael Blazitz
- Phillip Bobo
- Joseph Bock
- Dominec Boddie
- Nicholas Bolkovac
- Andrew Bolton
- Ronald Bolton
- Scott Bolzan
- Vaughn Booker
- Ryan Boschetti
- Keith Bostic
- Michael Boulware
- Emil Boures
- Sam Bowers
- Charles Bowser
- Bobby Boyd
- Brent Boyd
- Gregory Boyd
- Greg Bracelin
- Ed Bradley
- Henry Bradley
- Otha Bradley
- Bill Bradley
- Kyle Brady
- Stephen Braggs
- Dennis Bragonier
- Daniel Brandenburg
- David Brandon
- Scot Brantley
- Melvin Bratton
- Robert Brazile
- Jeff Bregel
- John Brewer
- Greg Brewton
- Lamont Brightful
- Vincent Brisby
- Jerry Broadnax
- Vaughn Broadnax
- Timothy Broady
- John Brodie
- Kevin Brooks
- Michael Brooks
- James Brophy
- Luther Broughton
- Steven Broussard
- Aaron Brown
- Cedric Brown
- Chad Brown
- Charles Brown
- Curtis Brown
- Deauntae Brown
- Edward Brown
- Fakhir Brown
- Gregory Brown
- Joseph "Berry" Brown
- Lance Brown
- Lomas Brown
- Marc S. Brown
- Raymond Brown
- Reggie Brown
- Regilyn Brown
- Reginald Brown
- Robert L. Brown
- Robert Lee Brown
- Roger Brown
- Ronald Brown
- Terry Brown
- Keith Browner
- Ross Browner
- Lydia Brunet
- Bob Brunet
- Jeffrey Bryant
- Maurice Bryant
- Warren Bryant
- Miguel ("Mike") Bryce-Dingle
- Vince Buck
- Robert Buczkowski
- Ed Budde
- Dan Buenning
- Danny Buggs
- Drew Buie
- Rudolph Bukich
- Norman Bulaich
- Courtland Bullard
- Courtland Bullard Jr.
- Jarrod Bunch
- Jim Bundren
- James Burgess
- Randall William Burke
- Bobby Burnett
- Joe Burns
- Jeff Burris
- Derrick Burroughs
- Noah Burroughs
- Kenneth Burrow
- Blair Bush
- Andy Bushak
- Dexter Bussey
- Robert Butler
- Duane Butler
- Leroy Butler
- Michael Butler
- Raymond Butler
- Keith Byars
- Carl Byrum
- James Cadile
- William Cahill
- Kenneth Callicut
- Kenneth Callicutt
- Christopher Calloway
- Richard Camarillo
- Lamar Campbell
- Woody Campbell
- James Cannida
- John Cappelletti
- Joe Carmen
- Albert Carmichael
- Brett Carolan
- Joe Carollo
- Ronald Carpenter Jr.
- William Carr
- Roger Carr
- Alphonso Carreker
- Paul Carrington
- Travis Carroll
- Allen Carter
- Dale Carter
- Jonathan Carter
- Lavonya Carter
- Michael Carter
- Rubin Carter
- Virgil Carter
- Johndale Carty
- Melvin Carver
- Shante Carver
- Scott Case
- Richard Cash
- Tom Cassese
- Mark Catano
- Carmen Cavalli
- Mario Celotto
- Eugene Ceppetelli
- Gordon Ceresino
- Byron Chamberlain
- Chris Chambers
- Dionna Chambers
- Robert Chancey
- Lindsey Chapman
- John Charles
- Michael Cheever
- Darrin Chiaverini
- Mark Chmura
- Jason Chorak
- Herbert Christopher
- Earl Christy
- Greg Christy
- Jeff Christy
- Eugene Chung
- Vinny Ciurciu
- Darryl Clack
- Allan V. Clark
- Gail Clark
- Jamal Clark
- Kenneth Clark
- Mario Clark
- Randy Clark
- Reginald Clark
- Stephen Clark
- Vincent Clark
- Wayne Clark
- Kenneth Clarke
- Raymond Clayborn
- Felipe Claybrooks
- Harvey Clayton
- Cam Cleeland
- Anthony Cline Sr.
- Tony F. Cline Jr.
- Jonathan Clinkscale
- Michael Cloud
- Ben Coates
- Tony Coats
- Garry Cobb
- Marvin Cobb
- Joe Cocozzo
- Sherman Cocroft
- Ron Coder
- Gail Cogdill
- Daniel Colchico
- Larry Cole
- Lincoln Coleman Jr.
- Roderick Coleman
- Cosey Coleman
- Anthony Collins
- Calvin Collins
- Frank Collins
- Glen Collins
- Mark Collins
- Mo Collins
- Shawn Collins
- Ben Colman
- James Colvin
- Chuck Commiskey
- Glen Condren
- Mike Connelly
- John Connon
- Scott Conover
- John Contoulis
- Edward Cooke
- William Cooke
- Robert Cooksey
- Robert Coons
- Chris Cooper
- Deke Cooper
- Earl Cooper
- Jarrod Cooper
- Mark Cooper
- Obadiah Cooper
- Danny Copeland
- Horace Copeland
- Gowdy Cornell
- Frank Cornish III
- Quentin Coryatt
- Doug Cosbie
- Marcia Cosma
- Dave Costa
- Paul Costa
- Mark Cotney
- James Cotton
- Marcus Cotton
- Terry Cousin
- James Covert
- Anthony Covington
- Arthur Cox
- Tom Cox
- Eric Crabtree
- Francisco Craig
- Neal Craig
- Vernon Crawford
- Joe Cribbs
- Henri Crockett
- Keaton Cromartie
- Pete Cronan
- Cleveland Crosby
- Ronald Crosby
- David Crossan
- Charles Crow
- Lindon Crow
- Harry Crump
- Bob Cryder
- James Culbreath
- Curley Culp
- Brad Culpepper
- Carl Cunningham
- Michael Curcio
- William Curran
- Craig Curry
- Eric Curry
- George Curry
- Tom Curtis
- Randy Cuthbert
- Dave D'Addio
- Antico Dalton
- Lional Dalton
- Mike D'Amato
- William Daniel
- Chartric Darby
- Matt Darby
- Trey Darilek
- Don Davey
- Kenneth Davidson
- Al Davis
- Dexter Davis
- Elgin Davis
- John Davis Jr.
- Johnnie Lee Davis
- Johnny Davis
- Kenneth Davis
- Michael "Tony" Davis
- Mitchell Davis
- Oliver Davis
- Ronald Davis
- Russell Davis
- Thabiti Davis
- Troy Davis
- Tyrone Davis
- Wallace Davis
- Wendell Davis
- Fred Dean
- Vernon Dean
- Joe DeLamielleure
- Greg DeLong
- Robert Delpino
- Bob Demarco
- John Demarie
- Glenn Derby
- Brian Deroo
- Chuck Detwiler
- Anthony Dickerson
- Kenneth Dickerson Sr.
- Curtis Dickey
- Scott Dierking
- Christian Dieterich
- Stacey Dillard
- Bucky Dilts
- Gennaro DiNapoli
- Adrian Dingle
- Robert Dirico
- Corey Dixon
- Ernest Dixon
- Floyd Dixon
- Hanford Dixon
- Herbert Dobbins
- Conrad Dobler
- Kirk Dodge
- Jason Doering
- Stephen Doig
- Christopher Doleman
- Jeff Donaldson
- Doug Donley
- Michael Donohoe
- Coy Donohue
- Thomas Donquail
- Matthew Dorsett
- Tony Dorsett
- Eric Dorsey
- Reggie Doss
- David Douglas
- Maurice Douglass
- Rome Douglas
- Scott Dragos
- Troy Drayton
- Doug Dressler
- Shane Dronett
- James Druckenmiller
- Mark Duda
- A.J. Duhe
- Chris Duliban
- Jonathan Dumbauld
- James Brian Duncan
- Jamie Duncan
- Kenneth Dunek
- Leonard Dunlap
- London Dunlap
- Reggie Dupard
- Mark Duper
- Billy Joe Dupree
- Marcus Dupree
- Pete Duranko
- Sandy Durko
- Dusty Dvoracek
- Robin Earl
- Kenny Easley
- A Doug Easlick
- Ray Easterling (deceased)
- Irvin Eatman
- Chad Eaton
- Scott Eaton
- Tracey Eaton
- John Ebersole
- Brad Edelman
- Kalimba Edwards
- Chris Edmonds
- Marc Edwards
- Mario Edwards
- Robert Edwards
- Timothy Edwards Jr.
- Tyrone Edwards
- Ronald Egloff
- Chuck Ehin
- Gary Ellerson
- Craig Ellis
- Edward Ellis
- Ken Ellis
- Ray Ellis
- Richard Ellis
- Dave Elmendorf
- Jimbo Elrod
- Bert Emanuel
- Derek Engler
- Phil Epps
- Paul Ernster
- Michael Esposito
- Lawrence Estes
- Gregory Evans
- Larry Evans
- Michael Evans
- Kevin Everett
- Major Everett
- Steve Everitt
- Nuu Faaola
- Jim Fahnhorst
- Terry Fair
- Ken Fantetti
- Mel Farr Jr.
- Michael Farr
- Trev Faulk
- Jeff Faulkner
- Gerald Feehery
- Rick Fenney
- Joe Ferguson
- Keith Ferguson
- Bill Ferrario
- Brad Fichtel
- Ascotti (Scott) Fields
- Edgar Fields
- Mark Fields
- Dan Fike
- Matter Finkes
- Jim Finn
- Levar Fisher
- John Fitzgerald
- Jim Flanigan
- Flint Fleming
- Steve Foley
- Lee Folkins
- Bernard Ford
- Brad Ford
- Jay Foreman
- Fred Forsberg
- Elliot Fortune
- Barry Foster
- Roy Foster
- Elbert Foules
- Jamal Fountaine
- John Fourcade
- Ryan Fowler
- Tim Fox
- Bobby Franklin
- Byron Franklin Sr.
- Jane Frederickson
- Rob Frederickson
- Solomon Freelon
- Lorenzo Freeman
- Mike Freeman
- Phillip Freeman
- Rockne Freitas
- William Frizzell
- David Fulcher
- Mike Fuller
- Darrell Fullington
- Frenchy Fuqua
- Dominic Furio
- Anthony Furjanic
- Michael Thomas Furrey
- Oronde Gadsden
- Derrick Gaffney
- Lawrence Gagner
- George Gaiser
- Scott Galbraith
- Duane Galloway
- Scott Galyon
- Mike Gann
- Mark Garalczyk
- Frank Garcia
- James Garcia
- Talman Gardner
- Thomas Garlick
- Kelvin Garmon
- Kevin Garrett
- Walt Garrison
- Percell Gaskins
- Jim Gatziolis
- Akbar Gbaja-Biamila
- Jumpy Geathers
- Kenneth Geddes
- Chris Gedney
- Mitchell Geier
- Chris Geile
- Dennis Gentry
- Jammi German
- Ronnie Ghent
- Antonio Gibson
- Ernest Gibson
- Jimmie Giles
- Darrel Gill
- Hubert Ginn
- Reggie Gipson
- Bob Gladieux
- Brian Glasgow
- Lamarr Glenn
- Andrew Glover
- Randall Godfrey
- Leo Goeas
- Brad Goebel
- George Goeddeke
- Jack Golden
- Austin Gonsoulin
- Chris Goode
- Conrad Goode
- Kerry Goode
- Robert Hunter Goodwin
- Tom Goosby
- Jeff Gossett
- Leonard Gotshalk
- Kurt Gouveia
- Cornell Gowdy
- Jim Grabowski
- Randy Gradishar
- Neil Graff
- William Graham
- Darryl Grant
- Bob Grant
- Marsharne Graves
- Rory Graves
- Carlton Gray
- Melvin Gray
- Terry Gray
- David Grayson
- Donald Greco
- Donnie Green
- Woody Green
- George ("Tiger") Greene
- Guy Green
- Hugh Green
- Jacob Green
- Jacquez Green
- Jarvis Green
- Paul Green
- Roy Green
- Victor Green
- Willie Green
- Kenneth Greene
- Carl Greenwood
- David Greenwood
- Curtis Greer
- Robert Gregor
- James Grier
- Frank Griffin
- Jeff Griffin
- John Griffin
- Keith Griffin
- Ray Griffin
- Howard Griffith
- Billy Griggs
- Al Gross
- Jake Grove
- Paul Gruber
- Bob Grupp
- Eric Guliford
- Mike Guman
- Mark Gunn
- Keith Guthrie
- Myron Guyton
- Adam Haayer
- Dale Hackbart
- Drew Haddad
- Michael Haddix
- Samuel Haddix
- David Hadley
- Britt Hager
- Kris Haines
- John Haines
- Carl Hairston
- James Lamont Hall
- Ronald Hall
- Ronnie Haliburton
- Ron Hallstrom
- Darren Hambrick
- Troy Hambrick
- Keith Hamilton
- Ruffin Hamilton
- Steven Hamilton
- Gary Hammond
- Jermaine Hampton
- Rodney Hampton
- Anthony Hancock
- Kevin Hancock
- Charley Hannah
- Terry Hanratty
- Chet Hanulak
- Bobby Harden
- Mike Harden
- Arnell Hardison
- William Hardison
- Cedrick Hardman
- Terry Hardy
- Anthony Hargain
- James Hargrove
- Andy Harmon
- Clarence Harmon Jr.
- Dennis Harrah
- Charley Harraway
- James Harrell
- Al Harris
- Cliff Harris
- Duriel Harris
- Elroy Harris Jr.
- Joe Harris
- Kevin Harris
- Kwame Harris
- Leonard Harris
- Marques Harris
- Robert Harris
- Sean Harris
- Dwight Harrison
- Lloyd Harrison
- Jeff Hart
- Greg Hartle
- Frank Hartley
- Len Hauss
- Sam Havrilak
- Chilton Hawkins
- Wayne Hawkins
- Brandon Hayes
- Frederick Hayes
- Frederick R. Hayes
- Michael Haynes
- Harold Hays
- Herman Heard
- Garrison Hearst
- Johnny Hector
- Patrick Heenan
- Craig Heimburger
- Ron Heller
- Dale Hellestrae
- Keith Henderson
- Reuben Henderson
- Thomas "Hollywood" Henderson
- Wyatt Henderson
- Thomas Hendricks
- Brian Henesey
- Edgar Henke
- Charley Hennigan
- Terry Hermeling
- Steven Herndon
- Don Herrmann
- Bruce Herron
- Ronald Hester
- Ralph Heywood
- John Hicks
- Lamarcus Hicks
- Victor Hicks
- Darrell Hill
- David Hill
- Demetrius Hill
- Efrem Hill
- Eric Hill
- J. D. Hill
- Kahlil Hill
- Kent Hill
- Lonzell Hill
- Marcus Hill
- Raion Hill
- Sean Hill
- Bryan Hinkle
- Michael Hinnant
- Eddie Hinton
- Terry Hoage
- Michael Hoban
- Stephen Hobbs
- Liffort Hobley
- Lincoln Hodgdon
- Floyd Hodge
- Sedrick Hodge
- William Hoggard
- Kelly Holcomb
- Stephen Holden
- Eric Holle
- Joey Hollenbeck
- Brian Holloway
- Rodney Holman
- Bruce Holmes
- Jerry Holmes
- Joseph Holmes
- Leroy Holt Jr.
- Samuel Horner III
- James Hood
- Fair Hooker
- Bryan Hooks
- Tam Hopkins
- Wes Hopkins
- Mike Horan
- Don Horn
- Joe Horn
- Robert Horn
- Ron Hornsby
- Ethan Horton
- Jason Horton
- Jeff Hostetler
- James Hough
- John Wesley Houser Jr.
- Artis Houston
- Dana Howard
- Paul Howard
- Todd Howard
- Delles Howell
- Chuck Howley
- Bill Howton
- Chris Hudson
- Ken Huff
- David Hughes
- Tyrone Hughes
- Michael Hull
- Corey Hulsey
- David Humm
- Leonard Humphries
- Ricky Hunley
- Daniel Hunter Jr.
- Patrick Hunter
- Bill Hurley
- Maurice Hurst
- Scott Hutchinson
- Martin Imhof
- Rene Ingoglia
- Brian Ingram
- Byron Ingram
- Darryl Ingram
- Jerry Inman
- Joseph Iorio
- Gerald Irons Sr.
- Sedrick Irvin
- Darrell Irvin
- Heath Irwin
- Raghib Ismail
- Chris Jackie
- Brad Jackson
- Calvin Jackson
- Clarence "Jazz" Jackson
- Dexter Jackson
- Harold Jackson
- Jeffrey P. Jackson
- James Jackson
- Melvin Jackson Jr.
- Michael Jackson
- Rich "Tombstone" Jackson
- Rickey Jackson
- Scott Jackson
- Vestee Jackson
- Harry Jacobs
- Kendyl Jacox
- Roland James
- George Jamison
- John Janata
- Ernie Janet
- Bruce Jarvis
- Leon "Ray" Jarvis
- Jim Jeffcoat
- Dameian Jeffries
- Noel Jenke
- Kenneth Jenkins
- Alfred Jenkins
- Izel Jenkins
- Ronney Jenkins
- Melvin Jenkins
- Alred Jenkins
- Keith Jennings
- John Jennings
- Russell Jensen
- Jerry Jensen
- Jim C. Jensen
- Jim D. Jensen
- Ron Jessie
- Anthony (Tony) Jeter
- Thomas Jeter
- James (Jim) Bowman
- Jim Jodat
- Akili Johnson
- Albert Johnson III
- Alex Dexter Johnson
- Allen Johnson
- Anthony Johnson
- Chris W. Johnson
- Jack Johnson
- Jarrod Johnson
- John Johnson
- Kermit Johnson
- Kevin Johnson
- Larry Johnson Sr.
- Marty Johnson
- Mitchell Johnson
- Olrick Johnson
- Rob Johnson
- Sidney Johnson
- Todd Johnson
- Troy Johnson
- Trumaine Johnson
- Undra Johnson
- Vaughn Johnson
- Joseph Johnston
- Aaron Jones
- Anthony Jones
- Broderick Jones
- Clinton Jones
- Darrel Earl Jones
- Daryll Jones
- Donald Jones
- Douglas C. Jones
- Ernest Jones
- Gary Jones
- George Jones
- James Jones
- Jeffrey Jones
- Kenneth Jones
- Kirk Cameron Jones
- Larry Jones
- Markeysia Jones
- Marvin Jones
- Michael L. Jones
- Selwyn Jones
- Steve Jones
- Victor Jones
- Willie Jones
- Leander Jordan
- Lee Roy Jordan
- Richard Jordan
- David Jordon
- Keith Joseph
- Matt Joyce
- Seth Joyner
- William Judson
- William Judson
- Kerry Justin
- Sydney Justin
- Isaiah Kacyvenski
- Mark Kafentzis
- Salaam-El Kamal Ali
- Larry Kaminski
- Carl Kammerer
- Rick Kane
- Joe Kapp
- Ted Karras Sr.
- Alex Karras
- Steve Keese
- Percy Keith
- Ernie Kellermann
- Leroy Kelly
- Robert Kelly III
- Todd Kelly
- Derek Kennard
- Allan Kennedy
- Lincoln Kennedy
- Rex Kern
- Wade Key
- Cedric Killings
- Bruce Kimball
- Steve Kiner
- Angelo King
- Ed King
- Horace King
- Kenny King
- Lamar King
- Linden King
- Shawn King
- Stephen King
- Kelly Kirchbaum
- Randall Kirk
- Louis Kirouac
- Michael Kiselak
- Jim Kitts
- Bruce Klostermann
- Gary Knafelc
- Bryan Knight
- David Knight
- Roger Knight
- Sammy Knight
- Tommy Knight
- Pete Koch
- Dave Kocourek
- Robert Kohrs
- John Kompara
- Mark Koncar
- Scott Kooistra
- Jeff Kopp
- Ken Kortas
- Steve Korte
- Scott Kowalkowski
- Merv Krakau
- Joe Krakoski
- Joseph Krakoski
- Kyle Kramer
- Bob Kratch
- Daniel Kratzer
- Paul Krause
- Dave Krieg
- Robert Kroll
- Charlie Krueger
- Rudy Kuechenberg
- Ralph Kurek
- Fulton Kuykendall
- Ted Kwalick
- Paul Laaveg
- Greg LaFleur
- Bruce Laird
- Greg Landry
- Robert Landsee
- Eric Lane
- MacArthur Lane
- Paul Lane
- Gene Lang
- Kenard Lang
- Le-Lo Lang
- Jevon Langford
- Ken Lanier
- Dan Larose
- Bill Larson
- Greg Larson
- Pete Larson
- William (Bill) Laskey
- JJ Lasley
- Derrick Lassic
- Lamar Lathon
- Don Latimer
- Paul Latzke
- Robert Lavette Jr.
- Henry Lawrence
- Pete Lazetich
- Edward P. Lee
- Keith Lee
- Burnie Legette
- Tyrone Legette
- Brad Legget
- Teddy Lehman
- Ashley Lelie
- Frank LeMaster
- Greg Lens
- A.D. Lester
- Otis Leverette
- Dorsey Levens
- Bill Lewis
- D. D. Lewis
- David Lewis
- Davis R. Lewis
- Derrick Lewis
- Eddie Lewis
- Frank Lewis
- Gregory Lewis
- Jamal Lewis
- Kevin Lewis
- Thomas Lewis
- Samuel Lilly
- Bob Lilly
- Scott Lindsay
- Larry Linne
- Ronnie Lippett
- Tony Liscio
- Floyd Little
- Greg Lloyd
- Frank Lockett
- Scott Lockwood
- Marc Logan
- Chip Lohmiller
- Jacqueline London
- David Long
- Tom Lopienski
- Zechariah Lord
- Ed Lothamer
- Andre Lott
- Thomas Lott
- Ronald Lou
- Tom Louderback
- Warren Loving
- David Lucas Jr.
- Nicolas Luchey
- Kai Ludwig
- Bill Lueck
- Steve Luke
- Bob Lurtsema
- Michael Lush
- Fran Lynch
- Don Macek
- Mark Maddox
- Reno Mahe
- Don Majkowski
- Van Malone
- Tony Mandarich
- William H. Mandley
- Wade Manning
- Tim Manoa
- Donald Manoukian
- Todd Marinovich
- Fred Marion
- Mitchell Marrow
- Curt Marsh
- Anthony Marshall
- Leonard Marshall
- Cecil Martin
- Douglas Martin
- Emanuel Martin
- Eric Martin
- Jamar Martin
- Matt Martin
- Rod Martin
- Anthony Martin
- Lonnie Marts Jr.
- Michael Mason
- Tommy Mason
- Billy Masters
- William Matan
- Ira Matthews
- Shane Matthews
- Vernon Maxwell
- Deems May
- Mark May
- Alonzo Mayes
- Frederick Mazurek
- Gene McArthur
- Kevin McArthur
- Gerald McBurrows
- Michael McCaffrey
- Reese McCall
- Don McCauley
- Dewey McClain
- Brent McClanahan
- Kenneth McClendan
- Tommy McCleskey
- Hurvin McCormack
- Mike McCoy
- Fred McCrary
- Gregory McCrary
- George McCullough Jr.
- Ron McDole
- David Michael McDonald
- Tommy McDonald
- Bubba McDowell
- Leonard "Bubba" McDowell Jr.
- Antonio McGee
- Ben McGee
- Dell McGee
- Tony McGee
- Mark McGrath
- Don McIlhenny
- Jeff McIntyre
- Reggie McKenzie
- Seth McKinney
- Steve McKinney
- Dennis McKnight
- Ted McKnight
- Tim McKyer
- Dana McLemore
- Kevin McLeod
- Kevin McLeod
- Dexter McCleon
- Donald McIlhenny
- Jim McMahon
- Don McNeal
- Fred McNeill
- Rod McSwain
- Michael Meade
- Karl Mecklenburg
- Bob Meeks
- Lance Mehl
- Jon Melander
- Chuck Mercein
- Richard Mercier
- Rondorick Merkerson
- Jim Merlo
- Mike Merriweather
- Aaron Merz
- Dale Messer
- Terrance Metcalf
- Terry Metcalf
- Rich Miano
- John Michels
- Bobby Micho
- Frank Middleton
- Ron Middleton
- Jermaine Miles
- Bryan Millard
- Anthony Miller
- Brett Miller
- Bronzell Miller
- Caleb Miller
- Calvin Miller
- Charles E. Miller
- Cleophus "Cleo" Miller
- Danny Miller
- Carl Miller
- Robert Miller
- Robert T. Miller
- Claudie Minor Jr.
- Travis Minor
- Kory Minor
- Aaron Mitchell
- Carlence Mitchell
- Darrell Mitchell
- Lyvonia A. Mitchell
- Mel Mitchell
- Pete Mitchell
- Shannon Mitchell
- Singor Mobley
- Art Monk
- Matthew Monoger
- Anthony Montgomery
- James Montgomery
- Marv Montgomery
- Ty Montgomery
- Peter Monty
- Michael Moody
- Alvin Moore
- Dave Moore
- Derland Moore
- Jerald Moore
- Otis Moore Jr.
- Stevon Moore
- Zeke Moore
- Emery Moorehead
- Stanley Morgan
- Thomas Moriarty
- Bryan Morris
- Randall Morris
- Fred Morrison
- David Morton
- Michael Morton
- Michael Mosley
- Zefross Moss
- Ronald Moten
- Zeke Mowatt
- Edwin Mulitalo
- Mark Murphy
- Calvin Murray
- Michael Myers
- Toby Myles
- Chip Myrtle
- Tom Nütten
- Gern Nagler
- Ricky Nattiel
- Omar Nazel
- Leon Neal
- Larry Ned
- Ralph Neely
- Robert Neff
- John Neidert
- Billy Neighbors
- Curtis Nelson
- Darrin Nelson
- Steve Nelson
- Doug Nettles
- Keith Neubert
- Ryan Neufeld
- Tom Newberry
- Michael Newell
- Bob Newland
- Anthony Newman
- Antonio Newson
- Robert Newton
- Mark Nichols
- Jack Nix
- Frederick Nixon
- Jeff Nixon
- Tommy Nobis
- Brian Noble
- Danny Noonan
- Karl Noonan
- Keith Nord
- Joe Norman
- Josh Norman
- Jerry Norton
- Jeff Novak
- Brent Novoselsky
- Frank Nunley
- Jeremy Nunley
- Matt O'Dwyer
- Brian O'Neal
- McDonald Oden
- Chris Oldham
- Hubie Oliver
- Brock Olivo
- Harold Olson
- Dave Osborn
- Scot Osborne
- Willie Oshodin
- Gus Otto
- Bob Otto
- John Outlaw
- Charles Owens
- Joe Owens
- Morris Owens
- R.C. Owens
- Richard Owens
- Terry Owens
- Ken Oxendine
- Gary Padjen
- Mike Pagel
- Joseph Pagliei
- Thida Paing
- David Palmer
- Richard Palmer
- Sterling Palmer
- Chris Pane
- Irv Pankey
- Joe Panos
- Ezekiel Parker
- Frank Parker
- Sirr Parker
- Brent Parkinson
- Don Parrish
- Richard Parson Jr.
- Patrick Pass
- Dan Pastorini
- Jerome Pathon
- Garin Patrick
- Roosevelt Patterson
- Mark Pattison
- Reginald Payne
- Eddie Payton
- Dave Pear
- Jayice Pearson
- Preston Pearson
- Erric Pegram
- Tupe Peko
- Bob Pellegrini
- Robert Penchion
- Christopher Penn
- John Pergine
- Antonio Perkins
- Ralph Perretta
- Brett Perriman
- Ed Perry
- Vernon Perry
- Christian Peter
- Kurt Petersen
- Jason Phillips
- Joe Phillips
- Charles Philyaw
- Lou Piccone
- Steve Pierce
- Mike Pike
- Jerrell Pippens
- Steve Pisarkiewicz
- Mike Pitts
- Dave Pivec
- Scott Player
- Art Plunkett
- Kris Pollack
- Frank Pollard
- Tommy Polley
- Keith Ponder
- David Pool
- Bob Poole
- Keith Poole
- Daryl Porter
- Ron Porter
- Myron Pottios
- Roosevelt Potts
- Craig Powell
- Karl Powe
- Marvin Powell
- Warren Powers
- Eugene Prebola
- Roell Preston
- Ray Preston
- Dave Preston
- Derek Price
- Anthony Prior
- Ron Pritchard
- Stanley Pritchett Jr.
- Wesley Pritchett
- Joe Profit
- Robert Prout
- Greg Pruitt
- James Pruitt
- Mickey Pruitt
- Michael Pucillo
- Jethro Pugh
- Brad Quast
- Richard Quast
- Bill Rademacher
- Wayne Radloff
- Randy Ragon
- Wali Rainer
- Mike Raines
- Gregory Randall
- Ervin Randle
- Thomas C. Randolph, II
- Saleem Rasheed
- Terry Ray
- Corey Raymond
- Rick Razzano, Sr.
- Gary Reasons
- Ken Reaves
- David Recher
- Jamaica Rector
- Rudy Redmond
- Clarence Reece
- Willis J. Reed
- John Reeves Jr.
- Kenneth Reeves
- Brandon Register
- Mike Reichenbach
- Lamont Reid
- Johnny Rembert
- Leonard Renfro
- Melvin Renfro
- Glenn Ressler
- Alan Reuber Jr.
- Fuad Reveiz
- Derrick S. Reynolds
- Jacoby Rhinehart
- Kris Richard
- John Richards
- Bucky Richardson
- Gloster Richardson
- Mike C. Richardson
- Mike Richardson
- Robert Richardson Jr.
- David Richie
- Thomas Ricketts Jr.
- Joseph Righetti
- Karon Riley
- Constantin Ritzmann
- Donald Rives
- Randy Robbins
- James Roberson
- Greg Roberts
- Walter Roberts
- William Roberts
- Bernard Robertson
- Jamal Robertson
- James E. Robbins
- Edward Robinson Jr.
- Jerry Robinson
- Mark Robinson
- Brian Roche
- Paul Rochester
- Michael Rockwood
- Rodrick Rodgers
- George Rogers
- John E. Rogers
- Kendrick Rogers
- Reggie Rogers
- Samuel Rogers
- Len Rohde
- Johnny Roland
- Donald Rolle
- Dave Roller
- John Roman
- Jim Romano
- Brett Romberg
- Tag Rome
- Andre Rone
- Dedrick Roper
- Scott Ross
- James Rouke
- Lee Rouson
- John Rowser
- Rob Rubick
- Todd Rucci
- Reggie Rucker
- Council Rudolph
- Jerry Rush
- Michael Rusinek
- Leonard Russell
- Reynard Rutherford
- Johnny Rutledge
- Frank Ryan
- Sean Ryan
- Mark Rypien
- Paul Ryzek
- Roderick Saddler
- Len St. Jean
- Sean Salisbury
- Clarence Sanders
- Michael Sandusky
- Rick Sanford
- O.J. Santiago
- Patrick Sapp
- Theron Sapp
- Kevin Sargent
- John Sawyer
- Noel Scarlett
- Mike Schad
- Dick Schafrath
- Michael Schneck
- Mike Schnitker
- Matt Schobel
- Ken Schroy
- Steve Schubert
- Gregg Schumacher
- Brad Scioli
- Clarence Scott
- Leon Searcy
- Mark Seay
- Michael Seidman
- Robert Selby
- Andrew Selfridge
- Muhammad Shamsiddeen
- Carver Shannon
- Dennis Shaw
- Curtis Shearer
- Chris Shelling
- Daimon Shelton
- Thomas Sherman
- Timothy Sherwin
- Paul Shields
- Billy Shields
- Sanders Shiver
- Roy Shivers
- Roger Shoals
- Charles Shonta
- Les Shy
- Michael Siani
- Ricky Siglar
- Ed Simmons
- King Simmons
- Sam Simmons
- Ed Simonini
- Keith Sims
- David Sims
- Nate Singleton
- Daryle Skaugstad
- Douglas Skene
- Tom Skladany
- John Skorupan
- Tavaris Slaughter
- TJ Slaughter
- David Sloan
- Jessie Small
- Torrance Small
- Fred Smerlas
- Ben Smith
- Carl D. Smith
- Charlie Smith
- Dave Smith
- Dennis Smith
- Fernando Smith
- Franky L. Smith
- Gordon Smith
- Irvin Smith
- James Smith
- Jerry Smith
- John Smith
- John H. Smith
- John T. Smith
- Lance Smith
- Philip Smith
- Rico Smith
- Russ Smith
- Tony Smith
- Jeff Smith
- Thomas L. Smith Jr.
- Timothy L. Smith
- Zuriel Smith
- Fred Smoot
- Jack Snow
- Jesse Solomon
- Ron Solt
- Michael Sommer
- Tom Sorensen
- Phillippi Sparks
- Armegis Spearman
- Ernest Spears
- Jimmy Spencer
- Maurice Spencer
- Greg Spires
- Jack Squirek
- Richard Stachon
- Walter Stanley
- Tony Stargell
- Ralph Staten Jr.
- Joel Steed
- Glen Steele
- James Steffen
- Rich Stephens
- Richard Stevens
- Santo Stephens
- Andrew Stewart
- James Stewart
- Ryan Stewart
- Arthur Still
- Shyrone Stith
- Ralph Stockemer
- Terry Stoepel
- Bryan Stoltenberg
- Dwight Stone
- Michael Stonebreaker
- William Story
- Tyronne Stowe
- Mike Strachan
- Arthur Stringer
- Michael Stromberg
- James Strong Jr.
- Danny Stubbs
- Pat Studstill
- Robert Suci
- Lee Suggs
- Shafer Suggs
- Daniel Sullivan
- John Sullivan
- James Summers
- Kywin Supernaw
- Patrick Surtain
- Ed Sutter
- Ryan Sutter
- Eric Sutton
- Reggie Sutton
- Terrell Sutton
- Bill Swain
- Reggie Swinton
- Patrick Swoopes
- Jeff Sydner
- Joseph Taffoni
- Joseph Tafoya
- Diron Talbert
- Don Talbert
- Barron Tanner
- Maa Tanuvasa
- Jack Tatum
- Terry Tausch
- Eugene Taylor
- Gregory Taylor
- Jay Taylor
- Roger Taylor
- Willie Taylor
- Larry Tearry
- Larry Tharpe
- R.C. Thielemann
- Anthony Thomas
- Charles Thomas
- Chuck Thomas
- Earl Thomas
- Joseph E. Thomas
- Kevin Thomas
- Lamar Thomas
- Lavale Thomas
- Rodell Thomas
- Rodney Thomas
- Anthony Thompson
- David Thompson
- Ernest Thompson
- Woody Thompson
- Vince Thomson
- Sidney Thorton
- Steve Thurlow
- John Tice
- Lewis Tilman
- Travares Tillman
- Mick Tingelhoff
- Glen Titensor
- Love James Tolbert
- Jeffrey Tootle
- Thomas Toth
- Stephen Towle
- Richard Trapp
- Dennis Tripp
- Jeremiah Trotter
- Billy Truax
- Don Trull
- Jerry Tubbs
- Robert Tucker
- Ryan Tucker
- Wendell Tucker
- Jessie Tuggle
- Godwin Turk
- Kyle Turley
- John Turner
- Kevin Turner
- Odessa Turner
- Maurice Tyler
- Wendell Tyler
- Eric Unverzagt
- Zack Valentine
- Bruce Van Dyke
- Billy Van Heusen
- Keith Van Horne
- Phil Vandersea
- James VanWagner
- Frank Varrichione
- Jon Vaughn
- Clarence Vaughn
- Alan Veingrad
- Patrick Venzke
- Clarence Verdin
- Kevin Verdugo
- Phil Villapiano
- Justin Vincent
- George Visger
- Stu Voigt
- Joan Wakeley
- Mark Walczak
- Kerwin Waldroup
- Bruce Walker
- Jackie Walker
- Jeffrey Walker
- Jeffrey L. Walker
- Malcolm Walker
- Sammy Walker
- Anthony Walker Jr.
- Wayne Walker
- Larry Wallace
- Roger Wallace
- Steve Wallace
- Chris Walsh
- Ward W. Walsh
- Ken Walter
- Zack Walz
- Dedric Ward
- Curt Warner
- Alvin Washington
- Brian Washington
- Dave Washington Jr.
- Joe Washington
- Mike Washington
- David Wasick
- Charlie Waters
- Lawrence Watkins
- Ira Watley
- Frank Wattelet II
- Theodore Watts
- Robert Weathers
- Cephus Weatherspoon
- Charles Weaver
- Jed Weaver
- Larry Webster
- Nate Webster
- Floyd Wedderburn
- Michael Weddington
- Bert Weidner
- Jonathan Welsh
- Tom Welter
- Ralph Wenzel
- Derek West
- Ed West
- Larry Whigham
- David M. White
- Edward White
- James Curtis White
- Lonnie White
- Mitch White
- Patrick White
- Randy White
- Russell White
- Willie Whitehead
- James Whitley
- Kevin Whitley
- Arthur Whittington
- J.R. Wilburn
- James Wilder
- Eddie Wiliams
- Reggie Wilkes
- Gerald Willhite
- Kevin Willhite
- Brent Williams
- Calvin Williams
- Chris Williams
- Darryl Williams
- Derwin Williams
- James Williams
- Joel Williams
- John L. Williams
- John M. Williams
- Kendall Williams
- Michael C. Williams
- Newton Williams
- Randal Williams
- Scott Williams
- Fred Williamson
- Mitch Willis
- James Willis
- Donald Wilson
- Eddie Wilson
- Jerry Wilson
- Quincy Wilson
- Reinard Wilson
- Steve Wilson
- Troy Wilson
- Brandon Winey
- Dennis Winston
- Dennis Wirgowski
- Cory Withrow
- Joe Wolf
- Mike Wood
- Ken Woodard
- Shawn Wooden
- Richard Woodley
- Jerry Woods
- Larry Woods
- Robert Woods
- Marv Woodson
- Roscoe Word Jr.
- Darrly T. Wren
- Eric Wright
- Felix Wright
- Rayfield Wright
- Steve Wright
- Terry Wright
- Toby L. Wright
- Torrey Wright
- Renaldo Wynn
- Jimmy Wyrick
- James Yarbrough
- Jeff Yeates
- Garo Yepremian
- Maurice Youmans
- Adrian Young
- Michael Young
- Richard Young
- Frank Youso
- Steve Zabel
- Carl Zander
- Emanuel Zanders
- Connie Zelenick
- Paul Zukauskas

== See also ==
- Chronic traumatic encephalopathy in sports
- Concussion – 2015 film by Peter Landesman
- Concussions in American football – Risk of concussion from playing American football
- Health issues in American football
- Helmet-to-helmet collision – Dangerous contact in gridiron football
- League of Denial – 2013 book
- National Football League controversies
- The Hit (Chuck Bednarik) – Famous 1960 moment in football
