= Dennis Wirgowski =

American football player (1947–2014)

No. 70, 75, 85
- Position: Defensive end

Personal information
- Born: September 20, 1947; Bay City, Michigan, U.S.
- Died: January 25, 2014 (aged 66); Kawkawlin, Michigan, U.S.
- Listed height: 6 ft 5 in (1.96 m)
- Listed weight: 257 lb (117 kg)

Career information
- High school: Bay City (MI) Central
- College: Purdue
- NFL draft: 1970: 9th round, 212th overall pick

Career history
- Boston/New England Patriots (1970–1972); Philadelphia Eagles (1973)

Career NFL statistics
- Games played: 50
- Interceptions: 1
- Stats at Pro Football Reference

Dennis Wirgowski (September 20, 1947 – January 25, 2014) was an American professional football player who played defensive end. He played high school football at Bay City High School and college football at Purdue University. He played professionally in the National Football League (NFL) for the Boston Patriots (later the New England Patriots) and the Philadelphia Eagles.

Dennis was diagnosed with Stage 2-3 Chronic Traumatic Encephalopathy at the VA-BU-CLF Brain Bank. He is one of at least 345 NFL players to be diagnosed after death with this disease, which is caused by repeated hits to the head.
