= George Washington Carver High School (Columbus, Georgia) =

Location
- 3100 8th Street; Columbus, Georgia; U.S. 32.4598°N 84.9456°W

Information
- Type: Public
- School district: Muscogee County
- Principal: Christopher Lindsey
- Teaching staff: 57.60 (FTE)
- Enrollment: 903 (2023-2024)
- Student to teacher ratio: 15.68
- Colors: Maroon and columbia blue
- Nickname: Tigers
- Website: website

George Washington Carver High School is a public secondary school in Columbus, Georgia. It served as the high school for black students until the public schools were integrated. A 2009 tax amendment provided funds to rebuild the school, which reopened in 2012.

== History ==
=== Integration ===
In 1963, the Muscogee County School District formed a special committee on desegregation. In September of that year, the school board approved a freedom of choice plan which would integrate one grade each year. In January 1964, the NAACP filed a lawsuit Lockett v. the Board of Education of Muscogee School District asserting that the district maintained an inferior school system for negroes. Superintendent Dr. William Henry Shaw testified that segregation was a "long and universal custom" and that abandoning it would "injure the feelings and physical well-being of the children." Nevertheless, in September 1968, the MCSD ruled that all grades were to be integrated through freedom of choice. When the federal court case U. S. v. Jefferson County Board of Education ruled that teaching staffs must also be integrated, the district agreed to assign at least two teachers who would be in the racial minority at every school. Both teachers and students considered the goal of this time period to be more focused on survival than on education. By 1970, under the freedom of choice plan, 27 of 67 schools in the district remained completely segregated. Most of the white schools employed only the mandated two black teachers, but many of the black schools employed more white teachers. Under the threat of a cutoff of $1.8 million in federal funds, the school district integrated the schools in 1971, resulting in a 70% white student population at Carver. Pictures of George Washington Carver were removed to soothe white students. In 1997 federal jurisdiction over the school district ended.

== Notable people ==
- Brentson Buckner, professional football player, professional football coach
- Isaiah Crowell, professional football player
- Wallace Davis, professional football player, coached at Carver
- Roderick Hood, professional football player
- Chris Hubbard, professional football player
- Jarvis Jones, professional football player
- Dell McGee, professional football player coached at Carver
- Syke Pachino, rapper and musician
- Ruby Sales, civil rights campaigner
- Jasper Sanks, football player
- Antonio Watts, college football player
- Gabe Wright, professional football player
