= Jarvis Jones =

American football player (born 1989)

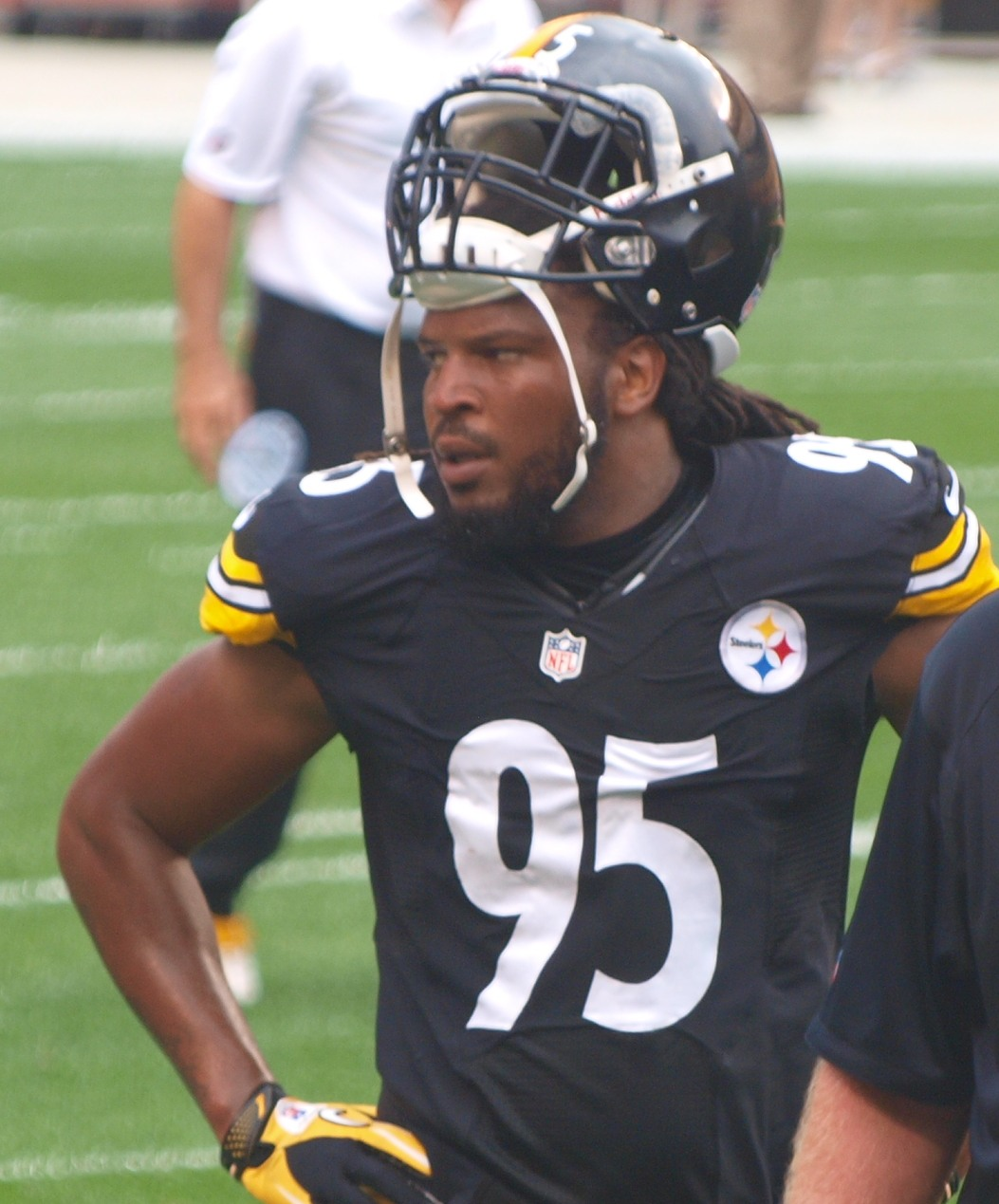
- Jones with the Pittsburgh Steelers in 2013

No. 95, 93
- Position: Linebacker

Personal information
- Born: October 13, 1989 (age 37); Lumpkin, Georgia, U.S.
- Listed height: 6 ft 2 in (1.88 m)
- Listed weight: 248 lb (112 kg)

Career information
- High school: G.W. Carver (Columbus, Georgia)
- College: USC (2009); Georgia (2010–2012)
- NFL draft: 2013: 1st round, 17th overall pick

Career history

Playing
- Pittsburgh Steelers (2013–2016); Arizona Cardinals (2017)*
- * Offseason or practice squad member only

Coaching
- G.W. Carver (Columbus, Georgia) (2025–present) Head coach

Awards and highlights
- Jack Lambert Trophy (2012); 2× Consensus All-American (2011, 2012); 2× First-team All-SEC (2011, 2012); SEC Defensive Player of the Year (2012)

Career NFL statistics
- Total tackles: 130
- Sacks: 6.0
- Forced fumbles: 4
- Fumble recoveries: 3
- Interceptions: 2
- Stats at Pro Football Reference

Jarvis Jerrell Jones (born October 13, 1989) is an American former professional football player who was a linebacker in the National Football League (NFL). He played college football for the Georgia Bulldogs and was recognized as a consensus All-American twice. He was selected by the Pittsburgh Steelers in the first round of the 2013 NFL draft, playing for them for four seasons before retiring following a short stint with the Arizona Cardinals in 2017. Since 2025, Johnson has served as the head football coach of George Washington Carver High School in Columbus, Georgia.

== Early life ==
Jones was born in Columbus, Georgia, and grew up in Lumpkin and Richland, Georgia. He attended Carver High School in Columbus, where he led his high school football team to a state title in 2007, and was rated as a four-star recruit by Rivals.com. In addition to playing football, he was an all-state basketball player. He was ranked the 59th best high school prospect by ESPN. He played in the 2009 U.S. Army All-American Bowl.

== College career ==
Jones attended University of Southern California (USC) for his freshman year in 2009, during which he saw action as a special teams and backup player for the USC Trojans Football team. In the first eight games, he recorded 13 tackles, including 1.5 tackles for loss. During the game against Oregon, Jones suffered a neck injury. He was later diagnosed with spinal stenosis and the USC medical staff would not clear him to play for the team again.

After the USC medical staff would not allow Jones to practice in the spring of 2010, Jones asked for and was granted a release to transfer. His high school coach contacted Georgia, Auburn, and Florida State to discuss the possibility with the teams' coaches. After meeting with Georgia Bulldogs defensive coordinator Todd Grantham, Jones underwent medical testing by the Georgia staff and was cleared to play football for the University of Georgia. He would have to redshirt during the 2010 season in compliance with NCAA transfer rules.

Jones started every game in the 2011 season, recording a career-high 4 sacks against Florida on October 29. He posted 70 total tackles including 19.5 for a loss, 13.5 sacks (which led the SEC), 2 forced fumbles and 26 quarterback hurries. He was recognized as a consensus first-team All-American, having been named to the first-teams of ESPN, the American Football Coaches Association, the Football Writers Association of America, and the Walter Camp Football Foundation.

On January 13, 2012, head coach Mark Richt announced that Jones would return for his senior year. In 12 games, Jones recorded 85 tackles (52 solo), 24.5 tackles-for-loss (best in NCAA), 14.5 sacks, one interception, seven forced fumbles and two fumbles recovered. He missed the games against Kentucky and Florida Atlantic, but played an integral role in wins over Missouri and Florida. Jones was named an AFCA First-team All-American and the Southeastern Conference Defensive Player of the Year by the Associated Press and voted The 2012 Premier Player of College Football by sports fans. On January 4, 2013, Jones declared for the NFL draft.

== Professional career ==
Pre-draft measurables
Height	Weight	Arm length	Hand span	40-yard dash	10-yard split	20-yard split	20-yard shuttle	Three-cone drill	Vertical jump	Broad jump	Bench press
6 ft 2 3/8 in (1.89 m)	245 lb (111 kg)	33 in (0.84 m)	9 1/8 in (0.23 m)	4.88 s	1.66 s	2.79 s	4.71 s	7.46 s	30 1/2 in (0.77 m)	9 ft 3 in (2.82 m)	20 reps
All values from NFL Combine and the Georgia Bulldog's pro day.

=== Pittsburgh Steelers ===
==== 2013 ====
The Pittsburgh Steelers selected Jones in the first round (17th overall) in the 2013 NFL draft. Sports Illustrated analyst Andy Benoit praised the pick in The Fifth Down blog. He signed a four-year deal worth $8.705 million with a $4.7 million signing bonus.

He began competing for a position at right outside linebacker with starter Jason Worilds and Terence Garvin. At the beginning of the season he was used as a back-up and rotated with Worilds. On September 8, 2013, he played in his first career game and recorded 2 solo tackles against the Tennessee Titans. The following week on September 16, he received his first start in place of Worilds and racked up a total of 8 tackles. The next four games he started in place of Worilds until Week 7. On October 29, 2013, head coach Mike Tomlin announced that Jones would be benched following the team's Week 8 loss against the Oakland Raiders.

On November 10, 2013, he got his first career sack in a 23–10 victory over the Buffalo Bills. Jones came in to replace starting left outside linebacker LaMarr Woodley for the next three games, after he went down with an injury in Week 10. When the Steelers played the Browns during the last game of the 2013 season, he had a season-high 9 total tackles, 8 solo tackles, and a pass deflection. He finished his rookie season with 40 total tackles, 30 solo tackles, a sack, and 4 pass deflections in 14 games and 8 starts.

==== 2014 ====
Jones began the 2014 season as the Steelers' starting right outside linebacker after the departure of LaMarr Woodley. On September 7, 2014, during the season opener against the Cleveland Browns, he had 6 tackles and registered his first sack of the year, matching his sack total from the year before (1). Over the first 3 games he had 14 tackles and 2 sacks.

On September 21, 2014, on Sunday Night Football against the Carolina Panthers, Jones suffered a cluttered wrist after forcing Cam Newton to fumble and left the game after recording his first career forced fumble and 2 tackles. Jones underwent wrist surgery the very next day and was placed on the injured/designated for return list. To replace Jones, the Steelers signed James Harrison on September 23.

In his first game back from his injury he had 3 tackles and a solo tackle in a Week 14 win over the Cincinnati Bengals. On January 3, 2015, after the Steelers finished atop the AFC North with an 11–5 record, Jones played in his first career postseason game as the Steelers' lost to the Baltimore Ravens, 17–30. He finished his second season with 18 total tackles, a career-high 2 sacks, and a forced fumble.

==== 2015 ====
Jones played in 15 games, all starts, for the team during the 2015 season, totaling fifteen solo tackles, fourteen tackle assists, two sacks, three pass breakups, one interception, and one forced fumble.

==== 2016 ====
On May 2, 2016, the Steelers declined the fifth-year option on Jones, making him a free agent after the 2016 season. He played in 14 games, had 42 combined tackles, 29 solo tackles, 13 tackle assists, 1 sack, 3 pass breakups, 1 interception, and 2 forced fumbles.

In week 10, after the Steelers 35-30 loss to the Cowboys, he was replaced by James Harrison in the starting lineup for Week 11 against the Cleveland Browns.

Jones recorded 6 sacks throughout his career with the Steelers. However, he struggled to develop into an effective pass rusher and live up to expectations as a first-round draft pick. He has been labeled as a "bust" by fans and other media outlets following his performance with the team. The selection of Jones has been labeled as the Steelers worst draft pick by Pro Football Focus dating back to 2006.

=== Arizona Cardinals ===
On March 14, 2017, Jones signed with the Arizona Cardinals. On September 2, 2017, the Cardinals released Jones with an injury settlement.

== NFL career statistics ==
Legend
**Bold**	Career high

=== Regular season ===
Year	Team	Games		Tackles					Interceptions					Fumbles			
Year	Team	GP	GS	Cmb	Solo	Ast	Sck	TFL	Int	Yds	TD	Lng	PD	FF	FR	Yds	TD
2013	PIT	14	8	41	**31**	10	1.0	**4**	0	0	0	0	**4**	0	0	0	0
2014	PIT	7	3	18	9	9	**2.0**	2	0	0	0	0	0	1	0	0	0
2015	PIT	**15**	**15**	29	15	**14**	**2.0**	1	**1**	5	0	5	2	1	**2**	0	0
2016	PIT	14	9	**42**	29	13	1.0	**4**	**1**	**20**	0	**20**	3	**2**	1	0	0
		50	35	130	84	46	6.0	11	2	25	0	20	9	4	3	0	0

=== Playoffs ===
Year	Team	Games		Tackles					Interceptions					Fumbles			
Year	Team	GP	GS	Cmb	Solo	Ast	Sck	TFL	Int	Yds	TD	Lng	PD	FF	FR	Yds	TD
2014	PIT	1	0	0	0	0	0.0	0	0	0	0	0	0	0	0	0	0
2015	PIT	2	**2**	**9**	**5**	4	**1.0**	0	0	0	0	0	**1**	**1**	0	0	0
2016	PIT	**3**	0	6	1	**5**	0.0	0	0	0	0	0	**1**	0	0	0	0
		6	2	15	6	9	1.0	0	0	0	0	0	2	1	0	0	0

== Personal life ==
His older brother, Darcell Kitchens, was murdered outside of a bar in Richland, Georgia, on January 9, 2005. Jones signed an endorsement deal for Subway just days before he was selected. He later unveiled a statue bust of himself along with other Subway sandwiches, following in the footsteps of quarterback Robert Griffin III. In 2019, he returned to the University of Georgia and graduated with a degree in Human Development and Family Science.

=== Coaching ===
In May 2025, Jones was named head football coach at George Washington Carver High School in Columbus, Georgia. In his first year as head coach, he led the team to a 15–0 record, winning the GHSA Class AA state championship with a 24–7 victory over the Hapeville Charter Career Academy Hornets.
