= Ralph Wenzel (guard) =

American football player (1943–2012)

No. 62, 54
- Position: Guard

Personal information
- Born: March 13, 1943; San Mateo, California, U.S.
- Died: June 18, 2012 (aged 69); San Mateo, California, U.S.
- Listed height: 6 ft 2 in (1.88 m)
- Listed weight: 250 lb (113 kg)

Career information
- High school: Cubberley (Palo Alto, California)
- College: San Jose State (1962-1963); San Diego State (1964-1965)
- NFL draft: 1966: 11th round, 168th overall pick

Career history
- Green Bay Packers (1966)*; Cleveland Browns (1966)*; Atlanta Falcons (1966)*; Pittsburgh Steelers (1966–1970); Miami Dolphins (1971); San Diego Chargers (1972–1973); St. Louis Cardinals (1974)
- * Offseason or practice squad member only

Career NFL statistics
- Games played: 71
- Games started: 2
- Fumble recoveries: 1
- Stats at Pro Football Reference

Ralph Richard Wenzel (March 14, 1943 – June 18, 2012) was an American professional football player who was a guard for seven seasons for the Pittsburgh Steelers and San Diego Chargers.

== Early onset of dementia ==
Wenzel's name gained notoriety in late 2009, when Wenzel's wife, Dr. Eleanor Perfetto, testified on Wenzel's dementia. Perfetto testified that Wenzel's football career probably had a causal effect with his dementia.

Wenzel was later confirmed to have chronic traumatic encephalopathy(CTE). He is one of at least 345 NFL players to be diagnosed after death with chronic traumatic encephalopathy (CTE), which is caused by repeated hits to the head.
