= Greg Lens =

American football player (1945–2009)

No. 72
- Position: Defensive tackle

Personal information
- Born: March 11, 1945; Marshall, Minnesota, U.S.
- Died: November 18, 2009 (aged 64); San Antonio, Texas, U.S.
- Listed height: 6 ft 5 in (1.96 m)
- Listed weight: 261 lb (118 kg)

Career information
- High school: Central Catholic (MN)
- College: Trinity (TX)
- NFL draft: 1970: 4th round, 86th overall pick

Career history
- St. Louis Cardinals (1970)*; Atlanta Falcons (1970–1971); Buffalo Bills (1972)*; New York Stars (1974); Charlotte Hornets (1974–1975)
- * Offseason or practice squad member only

Career NFL statistics
- Games: 21
- Stats at Pro Football Reference

Gregory Joseph Lens (March 11, 1945 – November 18, 2009) was an American professional football defensive tackle.

== Early life ==
Lens was born in Marshall, Minnesota, in 1945 and attended Central Catholic High School in Marshall. After high school, he spent two years in the U.S. Army as a tank driver at Fort Leonard Wood in Missouri and Fort Hood in Texas. He also played service football while in the Army.

After completing his military service, Lens played college football at Trinity University in San Antonio.

== Professional football ==
Lens was selected by the St. Louis Cardinals in the fourth round (86th overall pick) of the 1970 NFL draft. He appeared in 21 games for the Atlanta Falcons, 14 of them as a starter, during the 1970 and 1971 seasons. He also played for the New York Stars and Charlotte Hornets of the World Football League during the 1974 and 1975 seasons.

== Later life ==
Lens would worked as a football coach, athletic director, and teacher in south Texas high schools, including La Pryor, Premont and Poteet. He was inducted into the Trinity University Hall of Fame in 2007. He died in 2009. He is one of at least 345 NFL players to be diagnosed after death with chronic traumatic encephalopathy (CTE), which is caused by repeated hits to the head.
