= Wallace Davis =

American football player

Wallace Davis (Born circa 1944) was a former professional American football player who was signed by the Atlanta Falcons. Davis never appeared in a game and was only on the practice squad. In college, he played for the Lincoln University. After retiring from the NFL, he was the head football coach at Carver High School in Columbus, Georgia, where he also coached track and field. He was one of around 4500 players who successfully sued the NFL for concussion-related injuries in the case Anderson v. NFL.

== See also ==
- List of NFL players with chronic traumatic encephalopathy
