= Ray Easterling =

American football player (1949–2012)

No. 32
- Position: Safety

Personal information
- Born: September 3, 1949; Richmond, Virginia, U.S.
- Died: April 19, 2012 (aged 62); Richmond, Virginia, U.S.
- Listed height: 6 ft 0 in (1.83 m)
- Listed weight: 195 lb (88 kg)

Career information
- High school: Collegiate School
- College: Richmond
- NFL draft: 1972: 9th round, 223rd overall pick

Career history
- Atlanta Falcons (1972–1979)

Career NFL statistics
- Interceptions: 13
- Fumble recoveries: 6
- Sacks: 2.5
- Stats at Pro Football Reference

Charles Ray Easterling (September 3, 1949 – April 19, 2012) was an American professional football safety in the National Football League (NFL). He graduated from the University of Richmond in 1972 and was drafted by the Atlanta Falcons in the ninth round of the 1972 NFL draft.

== Career ==
Ray Easterling played 8 seasons for the Atlanta Falcons as a free safety, strong safety and occasional kickoff returner. He retired after the 1979 season, having appeared in 83 games and recording 13 interceptions and 6 fumble recoveries.

== Legal ==
In 2011, along with several other NFL players, including two-time Super Bowl champion Jim McMahon, Easterling filed a federal lawsuit in Philadelphia, against the NFL over its handling of concussion-related injuries. Unlike a similar suit filed in Los Angeles a month earlier, this suit is the first to seek class-action status and potentially include many other players. Attorney Larry E. Coben, representing the plaintiffs, stated, "The big issue, for us, is they were told for decades to lead with their heads. The NFL would never admit that there's any correlation (to later health problems)."

== Death ==
Easterling died on April 19, 2012, at the age of 62. His death was ruled a suicide. Easterling had clinical depression resulting from dementia having "lost the ability to focus, organise his thoughts and relate to people", with the dementia itself the result of the lifetime of head injuries during Easterling's career.

On July 27, 2012, Easterling's autopsy report was released. The autopsy by the medical examiner in Richmond, VA found signs "consistent with the findings of chronic traumatic encephalopathy" (CTE), a progressive degenerative disease that can be caused by concussions and has been linked to multiple blows to the head. The examiner determined that it was the underlying major condition that accounted for Easterling's difficulties. He was one of at least 345 NFL players to be diagnosed after death with this disease.

Easterling's wife of 36 years, Mary Ann Easterling, stated that she would fight to continue the lawsuit despite her husband's death, and will urge the league to establish a fund for players like her husband who suffered traumatic brain injuries from their playing days.
