= Western Reserve High School (Warren, Ohio) =

- Warren Western Reserve Raiders logo

Location
- 200 Loveless Avenue NW; Warren, (Trumbull County), Ohio 44485; United States

Information
- School type: Public
- Opened: 1966
- Closed: 1990 (as a high school) c. 2000s (as a junior high school)
- School district: Warren City School District
- Grades: 9–12
- Colors: Black and gold
- Nickname: Raiders
- Demolished: 2011

Western Reserve High School (also referred to as Warren Western Reserve High School) was a public high school located in Warren, Ohio, United States. It was one of two high schools in the Warren City School District. Athletic teams were known as the Raiders. Western Reserve opened in 1966 and was in operation until 1990, due to budget constraints and declining enrollment. The former high school consolidated with Warren G. Harding as a result. The high school was later used as a junior high school until sometime in the early 2000s when it was permanently closed. The high school was demolished in 2011.

== History ==
As the city of Warrens population grew in the 1950s and 60s along with a residential expansion on the city's south side, the city was in need of a second high school. Warren Western Reserve High School was built in 1966 on Loveless Avenue.

Warren's population declined in the 1980s, along with the high school facing budget constraints, Western Reserve decided to consolidate with neighboring Warren G. Harding High School in 1990. The building was used as a junior high school until sometime in the early 2000s when it was permanently closed. As part of the Warren City Schools redistricting process in the late 2000s, the school district shuttered and demolished all their junior high schools, including the former high school in 2011.

A memorial site for the former high school was dedicated in July 2022 called Raider Pride Park, on the Warren G. Harding High School campus. The project began in 2010, with t-shirt sales of the original Western Reserve logo and other fundraising events helped build the memorial.

== Athletics ==
Warren Western Reserve High School's athletic teams were known as the Raiders. Western Reserve participated in three high school athletic conferences within its 24 years of existence, including the Northeast Ohio Conference from 1970 until 1977, the original Steel Valley Conference from 1980 until 1985 and the All-American Athletic Conference from 1986, until their consolidation with Warren G. Harding in 1990.

Warren Western Reserve maintained a longstanding football rivalry with cross-town Warren G. Harding High School. The rivalry began with the opening of Western Reserve in 1966. Games between the Raiders and Warren Harding Panthers became among the most attended high school contests in Ohio, with crowds frequently ranging from 14,000 to 15,000 spectators at Mollenkopf Stadium. The rivalry coincided with success for football in Warren. Warren Harding captured Associated Press poll state championship in 1971 and the Ohio High School Athletic Association Division I state championship in 1974, while Western Reserve captured the first ever OHSAA state football championship in 1972, which fueled debate over supremacy within the city. The rivalry concluded following the 1989 season, after Western Reserve consolidated with Warren G. Harding following the 1989–1990 school year. Warren G. Harding retired its Panther mascot and inherited the Western Reserve Raider mascot following their consolidation.

Warren Western Reserve actively holds an OHSAA Division I state championship game record with Cardinal Mooney High School, for 2nd most attended state championship game with 29,720 fans in attendance.

The Warren Western Reserve Raiders were the first Ohio high school football team to win a state championship for in the state playoffs format, which the OHSAA introduced in 1972.

=== State championships ===
- Football – 1972

=== Associated Press poll winners ===
- Boys basketball – 1983
- Football – 1973

== Notable alumni ==
- Aaron Brown – former professional football player in the National Football League (NFL)
- Ross Browner – former professional football player in the National Football League (NFL)
- Keith Browner – former professional football player in the National Football League (NFL)
- Jim Browner – former professional football player in the National Football League (NFL)
- Joey Browner – former professional football player in the National Football League (NFL)
- LeShun Daniels Sr. – former professional football player in the National Football League (NFL)
