= Howard Kurnick =

American football player (born 1957)

No. 59
- Position: Linebacker

Personal information
- Born: May 13, 1957 (age 69); Cleveland, Ohio
- Listed height: 6 ft 2 in (1.88 m)
- Listed weight: 219 lb (99 kg)

Career information
- High school: South
- College: Cincinnati
- NFL draft: 1979: 8th round, 194th overall pick

Career history
- Cincinnati Bengals (1979–1980)
- Stats at Pro Football Reference

Howard Raymond Kurnick (born May 13, 1957) is an American former professional football player who was a linebacker for the Cincinnati Bengals of the National Football League (NFL). He played college football for the University of Cincinnati.
