= Joey Browner =

American football player (1960–2026)

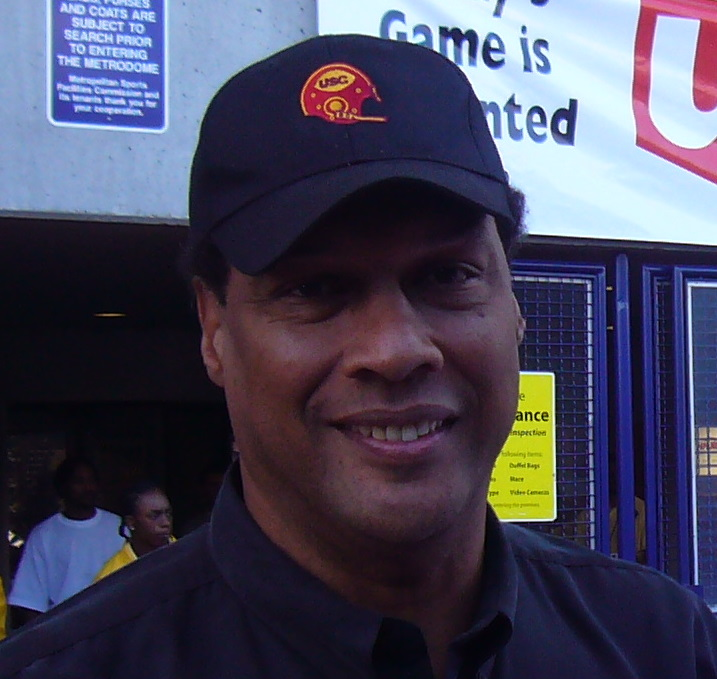
- Browner in 2007

No. 47
- Position: Safety

Personal information
- Born: May 15, 1960; Warren, Ohio, U.S.
- Died: March 28, 2026 (aged 65)
- Listed height: 6 ft 2 in (1.88 m)
- Listed weight: 221 lb (100 kg)

Career information
- High school: Western Reserve (Warren); Southwest (Atlanta, Georgia)
- College: USC (1979–1982)
- NFL draft: 1983: 1st round, 19th overall pick

Career history
- Minnesota Vikings (1983–1991); Tampa Bay Buccaneers (1992)

Awards and highlights
- 4× First-team All-Pro (1987–1990); 6× Pro Bowl (1985–1990); NFL 1980s All-Decade Team; Minnesota Vikings Ring of Honor; 50 Greatest Vikings; Minnesota Vikings 40th Anniversary Team; Minnesota Vikings All-Mall of America Field Team; Third-team All-American (1982); First-team All-Pac-10 (1982); Second-team All-Pac-10 (1981)

Career NFL statistics
- Interceptions: 37
- Interception yards: 465
- Fumble recoveries: 17
- Sacks: 9.5
- Total touchdowns: 4
- Stats at Pro Football Reference

Joey Matthew Browner (May 15, 1960 – March 28, 2026) was an American professional football player who was a safety in the National Football League (NFL) for the Minnesota Vikings from 1983 to 1991 and for the Tampa Bay Buccaneers in 1992. Browner played college football for the USC Trojans.

== Early life ==
Browner attended Western Reserve High in Warren, Ohio, for two years but moved for his junior and senior seasons to Atlanta, Georgia, where he attended Southwest High. He was an All State defensive lineman as a junior, played basketball with future NBA forward Gerald Wilkins, and ran track and field, qualifying twice for the Ohio State meet.

As a senior, Browner had 120 unassisted tackles and three interceptions, earning Parade All-American Honors as well as the Georgia class 3A lineman of the year. Browner was also named Atlanta Area Player of the Year. After high school, it was generally believed that Browner would follow his three brothers to Notre Dame, but he instead decided on the University of Southern California.

== College career ==
At USC, Browner was the team's Most Valuable Player in 1982. Other members of the Trojan defensive backfield included Dennis Smith, Hall of Famer Ronnie Lott, and future Los Angeles Rams head coach Jeff Fisher. Browner also played with Anthony Muñoz, Marcus Allen, Charles White, and Paul McDonald. He was also selected to the first-team All-Pac-10, first-team All-Coast. Browner notched 243 total tackles, nine interceptions, 40 passes defended, seven fumble recoveries, and three touchdown returns in his collegiate career.

His USC teams compiled a 36–8–1 mark. He played in one Rose Bowl Game and one Fiesta Bowl.

== Professional career ==
Browner, a safety, was selected 19th overall in the first round of the 1983 NFL draft by the Minnesota Vikings.

An outstanding defensive player and tackler, Browner was selected to six Pro Bowls (1985–1990) while playing with the Minnesota Vikings. He finished his career with the Tampa Bay Buccaneers in 1992. Browner was a four-time member of the John Madden "All-Madden Team".

While with the Vikings, Browner travelled to China with the NFL players association in 1988, to Germany with the 1989 USO Tour, and to Paris to kick off the French Federation of American Football Annual Championship game in 1991.

Browner amassed over 1,100 total tackles, caused 18 fumbles, and recovered 16 of them; he also led the Vikings in nine defensive categories over his NFL career.

Browner holds the NFL Pro Bowl record with three fumble recoveries returned for touchdowns. He had 40 interceptions in his career for 505 total yards, including the playoffs.

The Minnesota Vikings placed Browner in the team's Ring of Honor in October 2013 during a Sunday night football game against the Packers. He became the 21st overall selection into the Minnesota Vikings Ring of Honor that night.

In 2019, the Professional Football Researchers Association named Browner to the PFRA Hall of Very Good Class of 2019.

== Personal life and death ==
Browner's family has produced six NFL players: brothers Ross Browner (Cincinnati Bengals & Green Bay Packers), Jim Browner (Cincinnati Bengals), and Keith Browner all played in the NFL, as did Ross's son Max Starks (Pittsburgh Steelers) and Keith's son, Keith Browner, Jr. (Houston Texans). The Chicago White Sox selected Browner's next eldest brother, Willard, as a pitcher, and he served as the starting tailback for Notre Dame with late brother Ross's teams. His youngest and late brother, Gerald, played at the University of Georgia.

Browner was a member of the 1980s all-star all-decade team, of the NFL Gridiron Legends team, along with former Viking teammate Cris Carter and the PAC-12 all-century team, also on the EA Sports game, NFL Street 2. Joey Browner was enshrined into the African-American Hall of Fame in 2004 for his work in radio sports broadcasting with his longtime friend Rich Perez in Las Vegas and Hawaii.

He was nominated for Pro Football Hall of Fame selection nine times. Browner is the 21st member of the Ring of Honor and the 17th player in Minnesota Vikings history. He was inducted into the "All-Mall of America Field Team" in 2013, which signified the best players who played for the Vikings during their years at the Metrodome/Mall of America Field.

Browner died on March 28, 2026, at the age of 65. Former Vikings teammate Steve Jordan said after his death: "God blessed Joey with phenomenal talent and a big heart to love people and be a beacon of positivity. Truly, he will be missed."
