= Vaughn Lusby =

American football player (born 1956)

No. 29
- Position: Defensive back

Personal information
- Born: August 23, 1956 (age 70); Fort Polk, Louisiana, U.S.
- Listed height: 5 ft 10 in (1.78 m)
- Listed weight: 178 lb (81 kg)

Career information
- High school: MacArthur (Lawton, Oklahoma)
- College: Arkansas
- NFL draft: 1979: 4th round, 91st overall pick

Career history
- Cincinnati Bengals (1979); Chicago Bears (1980)

Awards and highlights
- 2× First-team All-SWC (1977, 1978)
- Stats at Pro Football Reference

Vaughn Lusby (born August 23, 1956) is an American former professional football player who was a defensive back in the National Football League (NFL). He played college football for the Arkansas Razorbacks. Lusby played in the NFL for the Cincinnati Bengals in 1979 and for the Chicago Bears in 1980.
