= Scott Burk =

American football player (born 1956)

No. 28
- Position: Defensive back

Personal information
- Born: August 2, 1956 (age 70); Houston, Texas, U.S.
- Listed height: 6 ft 2 in (1.88 m)
- Listed weight: 193 lb (88 kg)

Career information
- High school: Cherry Creek
- College: Oklahoma State
- NFL draft: 1979: 9th round, 223rd overall pick

Career history
- Cincinnati Bengals (1979)

Career NFL statistics
- Fumble recoveries: 1
- Stats at Pro Football Reference

Marshall Scott Burk (born August 2, 1956) is an American former professional football player who was a defensive back for the Cincinnati Bengals of the National Football League (NFL). He played college football for the Oklahoma State Cowboys.
