= Aaron Brown (linebacker, born 1956) =

American gridiron football player (born 1956)

No. 52, 55, 90, 91
- Position: Linebacker

Personal information
- Born: January 13, 1956 (age 70); Warren, Ohio, U.S.
- Listed height: 6 ft 2 in (1.88 m)
- Listed weight: 235 lb (107 kg)

Career information
- High school: Western Reserve (Warren)
- College: Ohio State
- NFL draft: 1978: 10th round, 252nd overall pick

Career history
- Tampa Bay Buccaneers (1978–1980); Winnipeg Blue Bombers (1982–1984); Cleveland Browns (1985)*; Philadelphia Eagles (1985); Atlanta Falcons (1986–1987); Winnipeg Blue Bombers (1988)
- * Offseason or practice squad member only

Awards and highlights
- 2× Grey Cup champion (1984, 1988); CFL All-Star (1984); CFL West All-Star (1984); First-team All-American (1977); 2× First-team All-Big Ten (1976, 1977); Second-team All-Big Ten (1975)

Career NFL statistics
- Sacks: 1
- Interceptions: 1
- Fumble recoveries: 3
- Stats at Pro Football Reference

Aaron Cedric Brown (born January 13, 1956) is an American former professional football player who was a linebacker for six seasons in the National Football League (NFL) with the Tampa Bay Buccaneers, Philadelphia Eagles, and Atlanta Falcons. He played college football for the Ohio State Buckeyes. He also played four years in the Canadian Football League (CFL) with the Winnipeg Blue Bombers, winning the Grey Cup in 1984 and 1988.

== Early life ==
Aaron Brown was born January 13, 1956, in Warren, Ohio. Aaron attended Western Reserve High School.

== College career ==
After graduation, Aaron joined the Ohio State Buckeyes. He was a 3-year starter from 1974 to 1977, and currently ranked 15th all-time in career tackles at 314, as well as 10th all time in tackles for loss at 181. He was inducted into the Ohio State Buckeyes Hall of Fame in 2021.

== Professional career ==
=== Tampa Bay Buccaneers ===
Aaron was selected in tenth round with the 252nd overall pick in the 1978 NFL Draft to the Tampa Bay Buccaneers.

In 1978, Aaron recorded just 1 interception in a week 2 game vs Detroit, his only stat his entire rookie season. Aaron appeared in all 16 games while starting in none. In 1979, Aaron appeared in 12 games and started just 1, with a forced fumble and fumble recovery and recorded his first career sack. He recorded another forced fumble and recovery in 1980. Aaron was released on August 24, 1981.

=== Cleveland Browns ===
Aaron was signed by Browns on May 6, 1985, he was later released prior to the start of the season on September 2, 1985

=== Winnipeg Blue Bombers ===
On October 4, 1982, Aaron was signed to the Winnipeg Blue Bombers in the Canadian Football League (CFL). He was released by the Blue Bombers in 1984 and came back to the team after being let go by the Falcons in 1986. He played for the Blue Bombers until 1989. During his time with the Blue Bombers, he recorded a touchdown, 7 interceptions, and 15 sacks and won 2 Grey Cups in 1984 and 1988 as well as a CFL All-Star selection in 1984.

=== Philadelphia Eagles ===
Aaron signed with the Eagles on September 19, 1985. He appeared in 7 games. On November 4, 1985, the Eagles released him.

=== Atlanta Falcons ===
Aaron signed with the Eagles on February 10, 1986, where he played for 2 seasons, appearing in 22 total games and starting in one. He recorded just one fumble recovery. This was Brown's last appearance in the NFL.
