= Jim Browner =

American football player (1955–2024)

No. 21
- Position: Defensive back

Personal information
- Born: December 4, 1955; Warren, Ohio, U.S.
- Died: March 6, 2024 (aged 68); Atlanta, Georgia, U.S.
- Listed height: 6 ft 1 in (1.85 m)
- Listed weight: 209 lb (95 kg)

Career information
- High school: Western Reserve (OH)
- College: Notre Dame
- NFL draft: 1979: 12th round, 304th overall pick

Career history
- Cincinnati Bengals (1979–1980)

Awards and highlights
- National champion (1977)

Career NFL statistics
- Interceptions: 1
- Fumble recoveries: 2
- Stats at Pro Football Reference

Jimmie Lee Browner (December 4, 1955 – March 6, 2024) was an American former professional football player who was a defensive back for the Cincinnati Bengals of the National Football League (NFL). He played college football for the Notre Dame Fighting Irish.

== Personal life ==
Jim Browner was born December 4, 1955, in Warren, Ohio. Browner is the brother of Ross, Joey, and Keith Browner, who also played in the NFL. Browner attended Western Reserve High School, helping his team win the first Ohio High School Athletic Association football state championship in state history.

Browner died on March 6, 2024, in Atlanta, Georgia at the age of 68.

== College career ==
Browner attended Notre Dame after graduation. He began his college career as a running back, rushing for 394 yards and two touchdowns in 9 games during his freshman season in 1975.

In 1976, Browner switched to defensive back, he played in 42 total games in his college career, recording 5 total interceptions, one of which he returned for a touchdown in 1978. Browner was a part of the 1977 National Championship team.

== Professional career ==
=== Cincinnati Bengals ===
Browner declared for the 1979 NFL draft, he was selected 304th overall by the Cincinnati Bengals. Browner appeared in all 16 games and started six during his rookie season. Browner recorded one interception that he took back for 15 yards, one forced fumble and two fumble recoveries.

Browner was released prior to the start of his second season in early November 1980. He was resigned by the Bengals shortly after his release, appearing in only two games and recording no stats. Browner was released again in late November 1980. Browner never appeared in another NFL game again.
