= Keith Browner Jr. =

American football player (born 1988)

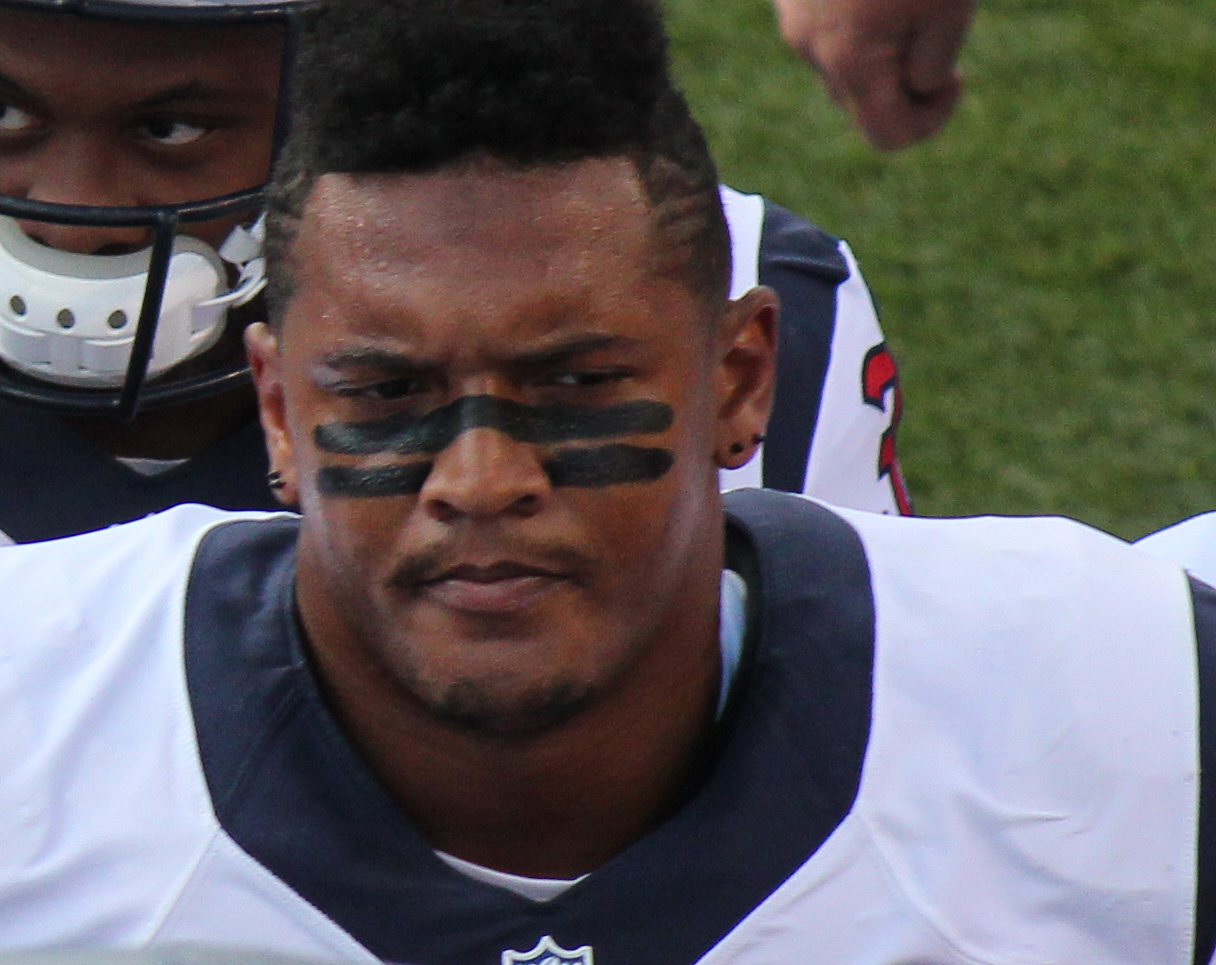
- Browner with the Houston Texans in 2014

No. 98
- Position: Defensive end

Personal information
- Born: April 7, 1988 (age 38); Tampa, Florida, U.S.
- Listed height: 6 ft 5 in (1.96 m)
- Listed weight: 288 lb (131 kg)

Career information
- High school: Susan Miller Dorsey (Los Angeles, California)
- College: California
- NFL draft: 2011: undrafted

Career history
- Houston Texans (2012−2014); Chicago Bears (2016)*
- * Offseason or practice squad member only
- Stats at Pro Football Reference

Keith Tellus Browner, Jr. (born April 7, 1988) is an American former professional football player who was a defensive end in the National Football League (NFL). He signed with Houston Texans in 2012 and Chicago Bears in 2016. He played college football for the California Golden Bears.

== Early life ==
Browner Jr. attended Dorsey High School in Los Angeles, California. Browner Jr. was selected to the SuperPrep All-Far West team. Browner Jr. was ranked as the No. 22 prospect among defensive ends and also was ranked as the 78th prospect among defensive ends in the state of California according to Rivals.com. He was ranked as the 44th defensive end by scout.com.

College recruiting
| Name | Hometown | School | Height | Weight | 40^{‡} | Commit date |
|---|---|---|---|---|---|---|
| Keith Browner Jr. Defensive end | Los Angeles, California | Dorsey High School | 6 ft 5 in (1.96 m) | 275 lb (125 kg) | 4.6 | Dec 2, 2005 |
| Keith Browner Jr. Defensive end | Recruit ratings: Scout: Rivals: | | | | | |
Overall recruit ranking: Scout: 44 (DE) Rivals: 28 (DE), 78 (CAL)
‡ Refers to 40-yard dash; Note: In many cases, Scout, Rivals, 247Sports, On3, and ESPN may conflict in their listings of height, weight and 40 time.; In these cases, the average was taken. ESPN grades are on a 100-point scale.; Sources: "California Football Commitments". Rivals.; "2006 California Football Recruiting Commits". Scout.; "Scout.com Team Recruiting Rankings". Scout.; "2006 Team Ranking". Rivals.com.

== College career ==
He played college football at the University of California, Berkeley. He finished Golden Bears career with 37 tackles, four sacks, four pass deflections and two forced fumbles.

== Professional career ==
Pre-draft measurables
| Height | Weight | 40-yard dash | 10-yard split | 20-yard split | 20-yard shuttle | Three-cone drill | Vertical jump | Broad jump | Bench press |
|---|---|---|---|---|---|---|---|---|---|
| 6 ft 4 3/4 in (1.95 m) | 266 lb (121 kg) | 4.99 s | 1.77 s | 2.90 s | 4.53 s | 7.48 s | 28.0 in (0.71 m) | 8 ft 8 in (2.64 m) | 18 reps |
All values from Pro Day

=== Houston Texans ===
In 2012, Browner Jr. signed with the Houston Texans. On August 31, he was released. On October 29, 2012, he was signed to the practice squad. He was signed to the 53-man active squad of the Texans on December 12, 2014. He was released from the Texans on May 15, 2015.

=== Chicago Bears ===
Browner signed a futures contract with the Chicago Bears on January 11, 2016. On August 28, 2016, Browner was waived by the Bears.

== Personal life ==
He is the son of former NFL linebacker Keith Browner and the nephew of former NFL defensive end Ross Browner and former six time Pro Bowl safety Joey Browner who played for the Minnesota Vikings from 1983–1991 and the Tampa Bay Buccaneers in 1992. He is the cousin of Pittsburgh Steelers offensive tackle Max Starks.
