= Keith Browner =

American football player (1962–2025)

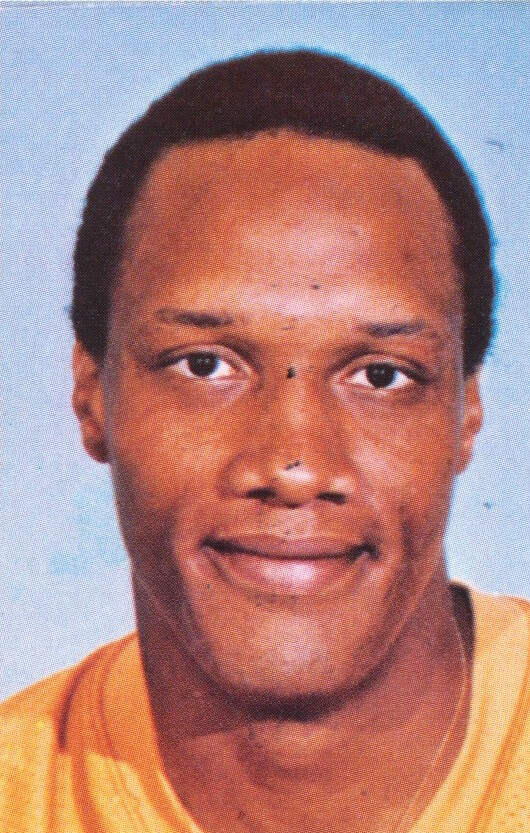
- Browner with the Tampa Bay Buccaneers, 1984

No. 57, 51, 59, 81, 53
- Position: Linebacker

Personal information
- Born: January 24, 1962; Warren, Ohio, U.S.
- Died: November 4, 2025 (aged 63); San Leandro, California, U.S.
- Listed height: 6 ft 6 in (1.98 m)
- Listed weight: 245 lb (111 kg)

Career information
- High school: Western Reserve (Warren); Southwest (Atlanta, Georgia)
- College: USC
- NFL draft: 1984: 2nd round, 30th overall pick

Career history
- Tampa Bay Buccaneers (1984–1986); San Francisco 49ers (1987); Los Angeles Raiders (1987); San Diego Chargers (1988); Toronto Argonauts (1990); Pittsburgh Gladiators/Tampa Bay Storm (1990–1993); Shreveport Pirates (1994); Charlotte Rage (1996); Arizona Rattlers (1997)

Awards and highlights
- 3× ArenaBowl champion (1991, 1993, 1997); PFWA All-Rookie Team (1984); Second-team All-Arena (1990); AFL All Star (1993); 2× Second-team All-Pac-10 (1982, 1983)

Career NFL statistics
- Sacks: 10.5
- Fumble recoveries: 5
- Interceptions: 4
- Stats at Pro Football Reference
- Stats at ArenaFan.com

Keith Tellus Browner Sr. (January 24, 1962 – November 4, 2025) was an American professional football linebacker in the National Football League (NFL). He played college football for the USC Trojans. He was the father of Keith Browner Jr., who became an NFL defensive end.

== Personal life ==
Browner was born on January 24, 1962, in Warren, Ohio, where he attended Western Reserve High School. Before his senior year, he moved to Atlanta, where he went to Southwest High.

The Browner family has been referred to as a "tremendous" football family, with all of Browner's brothers playing in the NFL. His eldest brother Ross Browner played for the Cincinnati Bengals in the NFL, and was inducted into the College Football Hall of Fame in 1999. Jim Browner also played with the Bengals after going to Notre Dame. Willard and Gerald Browner both exclusively played in college, while Joey Browner also played at USC before going to the Minnesota Vikings.

Keith's son, Keith Browner Jr., was a defensive end and linebacker who played for the University of California, Berkeley, and later played in the NFL. Keith's eldest daughter, Keicha, was a national synchronized swimmer and standout athlete in multiple sports in high school. Keith's nephew, Rylan Browner (son of Ross Browner), played football for the University of Arizona and Max Starks (Ross' biological son) is a two-time Super Bowl Champion who played with the Pittsburgh Steelers.

After retiring from football, Browner became an assistant coach in high school football while living in Stockton. He died on November 4, 2025, at the age of 63.

== College career ==
Browner played linebacker at the University of Southern California. He was referred to frequently in passing as a star player from the team. Browner was named to the All-Pac-10 team twice during his college career. Before the NFL draft, word spread that Browner was "inconsistent" and "didn't hustle," a trait that lead him to be a volatile prospect.

== Professional career ==
Browner was selected by the Tampa Bay Buccaneers with the 30th overall pick in the second round of the 1984 NFL draft. This pick was called the "worst choice of the day" by Chicago Bears scout Jim Parmer. At the end of his first season, he was named to the 1984 PFWA All-Rookie Team. Browner played in an era of intense struggle for the Buccaneers, with the team only winning ten games during Browner's three seasons. The team and Browner failed to see eye to eye, with Browner saying the team had a "losing attitude" while he was suspended for 3 days during his final season with the team due to his "chronic tardiness."

The Buccaneers traded Browner to the San Francisco 49ers for a 1988 sixth round draft pick. He was released by the 49ers in September before being resigned as a replacement. He spent only two more weeks with the team before being traded to the Los Angeles Raiders.

Browner was signed as a free agent by the San Diego Chargers on April 13, 1988. He was set to be used as both a linebacker and defensive lineman. After butting heads with all three of his past teams, initially spirits were high going into Browner's first season with the Chargers. However, on September 1, 1989, Browner was suspended for thirty days following a positive test for steroid use. He had previously started at defensive end during the 1988 season. Browner protested the suspension, referring to the test as faulty.

After being released by the Chargers, Browner spent time in the Canadian Football League. He spent time with the Toronto Argonauts before joining the Arena Football League (AFL). While playing in the AFL, Browner attempted to sign with the British Columbia Lions to no avail. He also spent the 1994 season with the Shreveport Pirates before being waived in May 1995.

Browner played with the Tampa Bay Storm of the AFL for three seasons, including while they were known as the Pittsburgh Gladiators. He also spent time with the Charlotte Rage in 1996 and the Arizona Rattlers in 1997. Browner was named to the second 1990 All-Arena Team team with the Gladiators and the 1993 All-Star team with the Storm.
