= Ross Browner =

American football player (1954–2022)

No. 79
- Position: Defensive end

Personal information
- Born: March 22, 1954; Warren, Ohio, U.S.
- Died: January 4, 2022 (aged 67); Nashville, Tennessee, U.S.
- Listed height: 6 ft 3 in (1.91 m)
- Listed weight: 262 lb (119 kg)

Career information
- High school: Western Reserve (Warren)
- College: Notre Dame (1973, 1975–1977)
- NFL draft: 1978: 1st round, 8th overall pick

Career history
- Cincinnati Bengals (1978–1985); Houston Gamblers (1985); Cincinnati Bengals (1985–1986); Green Bay Packers (1987)

Awards and highlights
- PFWA NFL All-Rookie Team (1978); Cincinnati Bengals 40th Anniversary Team; 2× National champion (1973, 1977); 2× Unanimous All-American (1976, 1977); Maxwell Award (1977); Lombardi Award (1977); Outland Trophy (1976); 2× UPI Lineman of the Year (1976, 1977)

Career NFL statistics
- Sacks: 62.5
- Safeties: 1
- Fumble recoveries: 10
- Interceptions: 1
- Stats at Pro Football Reference
- College Football Hall of Fame

Ross Dean Browner (March 22, 1954 – January 4, 2022) was an American professional football defensive end who played for ten seasons in the National Football League (NFL), mainly for the Cincinnati Bengals. He played college football for the Notre Dame Fighting Irish and was selected by the Bengals in the first round (eighth overall) of the 1978 NFL draft.

== Early life ==
Browner was born on March 22, 1954, in Warren, Ohio, where he also grew up. As a child he was primarily interested in swimming and diving, before concentrating on football. He attended Warren Western Reserve High School and during his senior year he was named first-team AAA (big school) all-state defensive end.

== College career ==
Ross Browner was one of the most decorated defensive players in the history of college football. At the University of Notre Dame he was a four-year starter at defensive end in 1973 and 1975–77. He was a unanimous All-America his junior and senior seasons of 1976 and 1977. In 1976, he won the Outland trophy as the nation's best interior or defensive lineman; also in 1976, United Press International named him Lineman of the Year. He won the Lombardi Trophy as the nation's best lineman and the Maxwell Award as the nation's best player and again won the UPI Lineman of the Year Award, the only player ever to win it twice. In the decade of the 1970s, Browner was the only lineman who won the Maxwell. In 1977, he also placed fifth in voting for the Heisman Trophy. During his senior year in college, he was featured on the cover of Sports Illustrated with the subheading of "Notre Dame's Peerless Ross Browner."

Notre Dame had a 39–7 record in his time that covered 11–0 in 1973, 8–3 in 1975, 9–3 in 1976, and 11–1 in 1977. Notre Dame won National Championships in 1973 and 1977. His career statistics record 340 tackles, a school record; ten deflected passes, two blocked kicks. He also scored a touchdown and two safeties. Browner was inducted into the College Football Hall of Fame in 1999.

== Professional career ==
He was the first-round draft pick in the 1978 NFL draft for the Cincinnati Bengals. Voted the team's Most Valuable Player in 1978, he played nine seasons for the Bengals. He set the Super Bowl record for tackles by a defensive lineman in Super Bowl XVI. In 1985, he jumped to the Houston Gamblers of the USFL, but returned the same season to the Bengals. Browner played one season (1987) with the Green Bay Packers before retiring.

== Later life and death ==
After retiring, Browner lived for several years in Mason, Ohio, and worked in sports entertainment, the cleaning industry, insurance, mortgages, and business development. He latterly worked in real estate and lived in Nashville, Tennessee.

Browner was the father of former Pittsburgh Steelers offensive tackle Max Starks and former University of Arizona player Rylan Browner. Ross' brothers are former NFL players Jim Browner, Keith Browner and Joey Browner. His nephew, Keith Browner, Jr., played for the Houston Texans.

He died of complications from COVID-19 on January 4, 2022, at the age of 67.
