= 2019 Minnesota Vikings season =

59th season in franchise history

- Owner: Zygi Wilf
- General manager: Rick Spielman
- Head coach: Mike Zimmer
- Offensive coordinator: Kevin Stefanski
- Defensive coordinator: George Edwards
- Home stadium: U.S. Bank Stadium

Results
- Record: 10–6
- Division place: 2nd NFC North
- Playoffs: Won Wild Card Playoffs (at Saints) 26–20 (OT); Lost Divisional Playoffs (at 49ers) 10–27
- All-Pros: LB Eric Kendricks (1st team)
- Pro Bowlers: 8: QB Kirk Cousins; RB Dalvin Cook; FB C. J. Ham; DE Danielle Hunter; DE Everson Griffen; ILB Eric Kendricks; CB Xavier Rhodes; SS Harrison Smith

Uniform
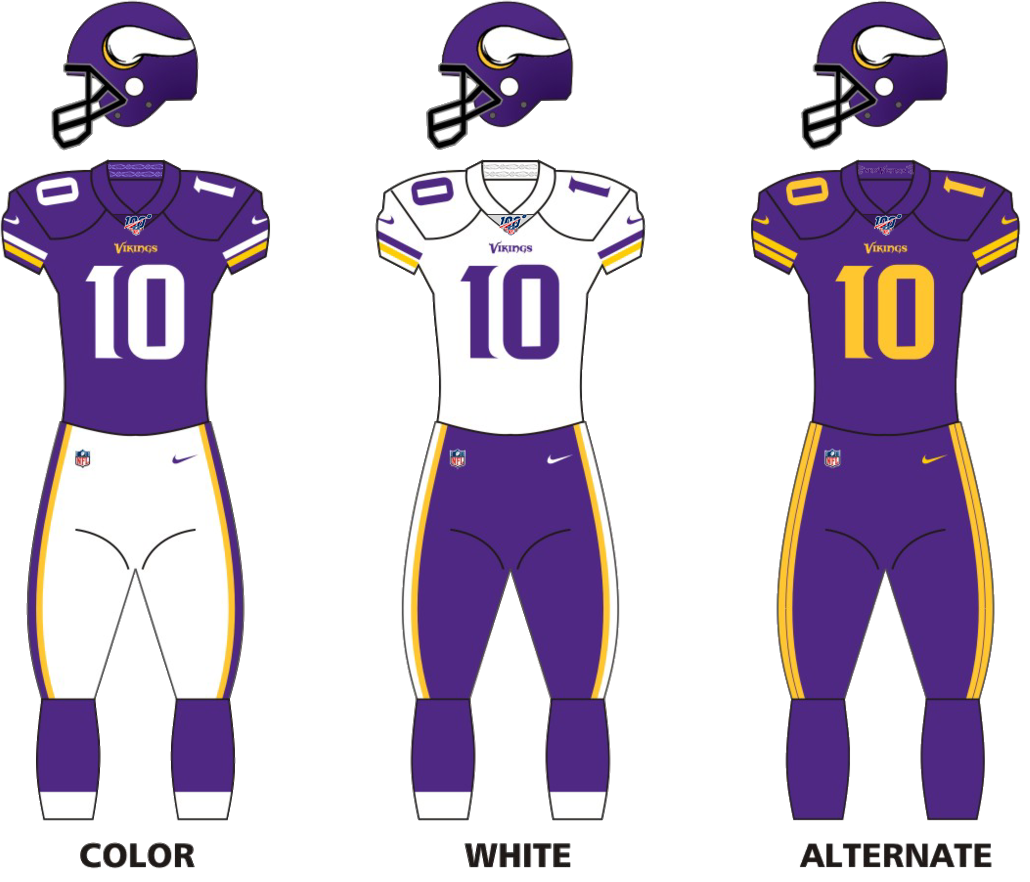

The 2019 season was the Minnesota Vikings' 59th in the National Football League (NFL), their fourth playing home games at U.S. Bank Stadium, and their sixth under head coach Mike Zimmer. They improved on their 8–7–1 campaign from 2018 with a Week 14 win over the Detroit Lions, and returned to the playoffs following a one-year absence after the Los Angeles Rams lost to the San Francisco 49ers in Week 16. That week, the Vikings were eliminated from contention for the NFC North division title, losing 23–10 to the Green Bay Packers. They defeated their Rival New Orleans Saints 26–20 in overtime in the Wild Card round but lost 27–10 to the eventual NFC champion San Francisco 49ers in the Divisional Round. As of the 2025 season, this remains the Vikings most recent season with a playoff victory.

== Draft ==
2019 Minnesota Vikings draft selections
Round	Selection	Player name	Position	College	Notes
1	18	Garrett Bradbury	C	NC State	
2	50	Irv Smith Jr.	TE	Alabama	
3	81	Traded to the Detroit Lions (Note: The Vikings traded a third-round selection (81st overall) to the Detroit Lions in exchange for third- and sixth-round selections (88th and 204th overall).)			
3	88	Traded to the Seattle Seahawks (Note: The Vikings traded third- and sixth-round selections (88th and 209th overall) to the Seattle Seahawks in exchange for third- and fifth-round selections (92nd and 159th overall).)			From Eagles via Lions
3	92	Traded to the New York Jets (Note: The Vikings traded a third-round selection (92nd overall) to the New York Jets in exchange for third- and seventh-round selections (93rd and 217th overall).)			From Chiefs via Seahawks
3	93	Traded to the Baltimore Ravens (Note: The Vikings traded a third-round selection (93rd overall) to the Baltimore Ravens in exchange for a third-round selection and two sixth-round selections (102nd, 191st and 193rd overall).)			From Saints via Jets
3	102	Alexander Mattison	RB	Boise State	Compensatory selection; From Ravens
4	114	Dru Samia	G	Oklahoma	From Packers via Seahawks (Note: The Vikings traded fourth- and sixth-round selections (120th and 204th overall) to the Seattle Seahawks in exchange for a fourth-round selection (114th overall).)
4	120	Traded to the Seattle Seahawks			
5	156	Traded to the Denver Broncos (Note: The Vikings traded their fifth-round selection (156th overall) to the Denver Broncos in exchange for a 2018 seventh-round selection (225th overall) and QB Trevor Siemian.)			
5	159	Traded to the New England Patriots (Note: The Vikings traded a fifth-round selection (159th overall) to the New England Patriots in exchange for fifth- and seventh-round selections (162nd and 239th overall).)			From Seahawks
5	162	Cameron Smith	LB	USC	From Bears via Patriots, Rams and Patriots
6	190	Armon Watts	DT	Arkansas	
6	191	Marcus Epps	S	Wyoming	From Titans via Ravens
6	193	Oli Udoh	OT	Elon	From Ravens
6	204	Traded to the Seattle Seahawks			From Patriots via Lions
6	209	Traded to the Seattle Seahawks			Compensatory selection
7	217	Kris Boyd	CB	Texas	From Jets
7	232	Traded to the New York Giants (Note: The Vikings traded a seventh-round selection (232nd overall) to the New York Giants in exchange for C Brett Jones.)			
7	239	Dillon Mitchell	WR	Oregon	From Eagles via Patriots
7	247	Bisi Johnson	WR	Colorado State	Compensatory selection
7	250	Austin Cutting	LS	Air Force	Compensatory selection

2019 Minnesota Vikings undrafted free agents
Name	Position	College
Micah Abernathy	S	Tennessee
Khari Blasingame	FB	Vanderbilt
Jake Browning	QB	Washington
Davion Davis	WR	Sam Houston State
Brandon Dillon	TE	Marian
Alexander Hollins	WR	Eastern Illinois
John Keenoy	C	Western Michigan
Nate Meadors	CB	UCLA
Tito Odenigbo	DT	Miami (FL)
Anree Saint-Amour	DE	Georgia Tech

Notes

- The Vikings were awarded three compensatory selections at the NFL's annual spring owners' meetings. They received one additional selection in the sixth round and two in the seventh round, compensating for the losses of Teddy Bridgewater, Tramaine Brock and Shamar Stephen.

Draft trades

== Staff ==
2019 Minnesota Vikings staff
Front office: Owner/chairman – Zygi Wilf; Owner/president – Mark Wilf; Owner/vice chairman – Leonard Wilf; General manager – Rick Spielman; Vice president of player personnel/assistant general manager – George Paton; Executive vice president of football operations – Rob Brzezinski; Consultant – Bud Grant; Head coaches: Head coach – Mike Zimmer; Assistant head coach/offensive advisor – Gary Kubiak; Offensive coaches: Offensive coordinator – Kevin Stefanski; Quarterbacks – Klint Kubiak; Running backs – Kennedy Polamalu; Wide receivers – Drew Petzing; Tight ends – Brian Pariani; Run game coordinator/offensive line – Rick Dennison; Assistant offensive line – Andrew Janocko; Offensive quality control – Christian Jones; Offensive quality control – AC Patterson	Defensive coaches: Defensive coordinator – George Edwards; Defensive line – Andre Patterson; Assistant defensive line – Robert Rodriguez; Linebackers – Adam Zimmer; Defensive backs – Jerry Gray; Defensive assistant/assistant defensive backs – Jeff Howard; Defensive quality control – Nick Rallis; Special teams coaches: Special teams coordinator – Marwan Maalouf; Assistant special teams – Ryan Ficken; Kicking consultant – Nate Kaeding; Strength and conditioning: Head strength and conditioning – Mark Uyeyama; Assistant strength and conditioning – Derik Keyes; Assistant strength and conditioning – Chaz Mahle

== Roster ==
2019 Minnesota Vikings roster
Quarterbacks (QB): 8 Kirk Cousins; 4 Sean Mannion; Running backs (RB): 31 Ameer Abdullah; 23 Mike Boone; 33 Dalvin Cook; 30 C. J. Ham FB; 25 Alexander Mattison; Wide receivers (WR): 14 Stefon Diggs; 15 Alexander Hollins; 81 Bisi Johnson; 19 Adam Thielen; 11 Laquon Treadwell; Tight ends (TE): 83 Tyler Conklin; 82 Kyle Rudolph; 84 Irv Smith Jr.	Offensive linemen (OL): 56 Garrett Bradbury C; 76 Aviante Collins T; 78 Dakota Dozier G; 65 Pat Elflein G; 69 Rashod Hill T; 64 Josh Kline G; 75 Brian O'Neill T; 71 Riley Reiff T; 73 Dru Samia G; 74 Oli Udoh T; Defensive linemen (DL): 97 Everson Griffen DE; 92 Jalyn Holmes DE; 99 Danielle Hunter DE; 94 Jaleel Johnson DT; 98 Linval Joseph DT; 51 Hercules Mata'afa DE; 95 Ifeadi Odenigbo DE; 93 Shamar Stephen DT; 96 Armon Watts DT; 91 Stephen Weatherly DE	Linebackers (LB): 55 Anthony Barr OLB; 40 Kentrell Brothers MLB; 54 Eric Kendricks MLB; 59 Cameron Smith OLB; 50 Eric Wilson OLB; Defensive backs (DB): 20 Mackensie Alexander CB; 38 Kris Boyd CB; 41 Anthony Harris FS; 24 Holton Hill CB; 21 Mike Hughes CB; 27 Jayron Kearse SS; 29 Xavier Rhodes CB; 34 Andrew Sendejo FS; 22 Harrison Smith SS; 26 Trae Waynes CB; Special teams (ST): 5 Dan Bailey K; 2 Britton Colquitt P; 58 Austin Cutting LS	Practice squad: 35 Tony Brooks-James RB; 3 Jake Browning QB; 43 Reshard Cliett OLB; 16 Davion Davis WR; 86 Brandon Dillon TE; 32 Mark Fields CB; 90 Stacy Keely DE; 52 John Keenoy C; 44 Nate Meadors SS; 17 Dillon Mitchell WR; Reserve: 12 Chad Beebe WR (IR); 42 Ben Gedeon OLB (IR); 61 Brett Jones C (IR/DFR); 89 David Morgan TE (PUP); Rookies in italics 53 active, 4 reserve, 10 practice squad

== Preseason ==
=== Schedule ===
The Vikings' preliminary preseason schedule was announced on April 9, with exact dates and times finalized on April 17.

Week	Date	Opponent	Result	Record	Venue	Attendance	NFL.com recap
1	August 9	at New Orleans Saints	W 34–25	1–0	Mercedes-Benz Superdome	73,018	Recap
2	August 18	Seattle Seahawks	W 25–19	2–0	U.S. Bank Stadium	66,636	Recap
3	August 24	Arizona Cardinals	W 20–9	3–0	U.S. Bank Stadium	66,698	Recap
4	August 29	at Buffalo Bills	L 23–27	3–1	New Era Field	57,765	Recap

=== Game summaries ===
==== Week 1: at New Orleans Saints ====
Week 1: Minnesota Vikings at New Orleans Saints – Game summary

Quarter	1	2	3	4	Total
Vikings	7	7	13	7	34
Saints	3	9	3	10	25

at Mercedes-Benz Superdome, New Orleans, Louisiana

- Date: August 9
- Game time: 7:00 p.m. CDT
- Game weather: None (indoor stadium)
- Game attendance: 73,018
- Referee: Clay Martin (19)
- TV: KMSP
- Recap, Game Book

Game information

First quarter

- MIN – Alexander Mattison 1-yard pass from Kirk Cousins (Dan Bailey kick), 10:38. Vikings 7–0. Drive: 8 plays, 76 yards, 4:22.
- NO – Wil Lutz 27-yard field goal, 2:26. Vikings 7–3. Drive: 14 plays, 55 yards, 8:12.

Second quarter

- NO – Wil Lutz 52-yard field goal, 9:58. Vikings 7–6. Drive: 12 plays, 59 yards, 5:53.
- MIN – Bisi Johnson 18-yard pass from Sean Mannion (Dan Bailey kick), 6:07. Vikings 14–6. Drive: 7 plays, 76 yards, 3:51.
- NO – Dan Arnold 18-yard pass from Teddy Bridgewater (pass failed), 0:44. Vikings 14–12. Drive: 6 plays, 79 yards, 1:02.

Third quarter

- MIN – Nate Meadors 30-yard interception return (Dan Bailey kick), 12:13. Vikings 21–12.
- NO – Wil Lutz 26-yard field goal, 6:38. Vikings 21–15. Drive: 11 plays, 68 yards, 5:35.
- MIN – Khari Blasingame 2-yard pass from Kyle Sloter (run failed), 3:54. Vikings 27–15. Drive: 6 plays, 72 yards, 2:44.

Fourth quarter

- NO – Wil Lutz 42-yard field goal, 14:55. Vikings 27–18. Drive: 9 plays, 25 yards, 3:59.
- NO – Lil'Jordan Humphrey 33-yard pass from Taysom Hill (Wil Lutz kick), 8:44. Vikings 27–25. Drive: 5 plays, 83 yards, 2:12.
- MIN – Mike Boone 64-yard run (Dan Bailey kick), 7:09. Vikings 34–25. Drive: 4 plays, 75 yards, 1:35.

Top passers

- MIN – Sean Mannion – 7/13, 102 yards, TD
- NO – Teddy Bridgewater – 14/19, 134 yards, TD

Top rushers

- MIN – Mike Boone – 4 rushes, 70 yards, TD
- NO – Taysom Hill – 6 rushes, 45 yards

Top receivers

- MIN – Tyler Conklin – 2 receptions, 56 yards
- NO – Lil'Jordan Humphrey – 2 receptions, 42 yards, TD

==== Week 2: vs. Seattle Seahawks ====
Week 2: Seattle Seahawks at Minnesota Vikings – Game summary

Quarter	1	2	3	4	Total
Seahawks	0	10	3	6	19
Vikings	3	7	7	8	25

at U.S. Bank Stadium, Minneapolis, Minnesota

- Date: August 18
- Game time: 7:00 p.m. CDT
- Game weather: None (indoor stadium)
- Game attendance: 66,636
- Referee: Jerome Boger (23)
- TV: Fox
- Recap, Game Book

Game information

First quarter

- MIN – Dan Bailey 24-yard field goal, 2:03. Vikings 3–0. Drive: 7 plays, 84 yards, 4:15.

Second quarter

- SEA – Jason Myers 33-yard field goal, 11:34. Tied 3–3. Drive: 12 plays, 60 yards, 5:29.
- SEA – DeShawn Shead 88-yard interception return (Jason Myers kick), 5:48. Seahawks 10–3.
- MIN – Irv Smith Jr. 3-yard pass from Sean Mannion (Dan Bailey kick), 1:05. Tied 10–10. Drive: 7 plays, 63 yards, 0:43.

Third quarter

- SEA – Jason Myers 52-yard field goal, 8:58. Seahawks 13–10. Drive: 5 plays, 38 yards, 1:02.
- MIN – Brandon Zylstra 4-yard pass from Kyle Sloter (Kaare Vedvik kick), 2:29. Vikings 17–13. Drive: 11 plays, 73 yards, 6:29.

Fourth quarter

- SEA – Jason Myers 27-yard field goal, 12:16. Vikings 17–16. Drive: 11 plays, 61 yards, 5:13.
- MIN – Khari Blasingame 1-yard run (Mike Boone run), 5:10. Vikings 25–16. Drive: 12 plays, 84 yards, 7:06.
- SEA – Jason Myers 20-yard field goal, 3:12. Vikings 25–19. Drive: 10 plays, 57 yards, 1:58.

Top passers

- SEA – Russell Wilson – 6/9, 82 yards
- MIN – Kyle Sloter – 11/13, 116 yards, TD

Top rushers

- SEA – Chris Carson – 5 rushes, 25 yards
- MIN – Mike Boone – 21 rushes, 66 yards

Top receivers

- SEA – Jaron Brown – 2 receptions, 52 yards
- MIN – Laquon Treadwell – 4 receptions, 47 yards

==== Week 3: vs. Arizona Cardinals ====
Week 3: Arizona Cardinals at Minnesota Vikings – Game summary

Quarter	1	2	3	4	Total
Cardinals	3	6	0	0	9
Vikings	7	0	0	13	20

at U.S. Bank Stadium, Minneapolis, Minnesota

- Date: August 24
- Game time: 12:00 p.m. CDT
- Game weather: None (indoor stadium)
- Game attendance: 66,698
- Referee: Walt Anderson (66)
- TV: KMSP/NFLN
- Recap, Game Book

Game information

First quarter

- ARI – Zane Gonzalez 32-yard field goal, 7:52. Cardinals 3–0. Drive: 8 plays, 54 yards, 3:26.
- MIN – Dalvin Cook 85-yard run (Kaare Vedvik kick), 7:10. Vikings 7–3. Drive: 1 play, 75 yards, 0:42.

Second quarter

- ARI – Zane Gonzalez 38-yard field goal, 13:12. Vikings 7–6. Drive: 12 plays, 55 yards, 5:33.
- ARI – Zane Gonzalez 47-yard field goal, 5:10. Cardinals 9–7. Drive: 12 plays, 46 yards, 6:43.

Third quarter

- No scoring plays.

Fourth quarter

- MIN – Mike Boone 7-yard run (pass failed), 8:20. Vikings 13–9. Drive: 6 plays, 80 yards, 2:43.
- MIN – Khari Blasingame 15-yard pass from Kyle Sloter (Kaare Vedvik kick), 0:50. Vikings 20–9. Drive: 14 plays, 86 yards, 6:08.

Top passers

- ARI – Brett Hundley – 15/25, 165 yards
- MIN – Kyle Sloter – 6/7, 102 yards, TD

Top rushers

- ARI – David Johnson – 9 rushes, 34 yards
- MIN – Dalvin Cook – 2 rushes, 88 yards, TD

Top receivers

- ARI – KeeSean Johnson – 7 receptions, 85 yards
- MIN – Bisi Johnson – 3 receptions, 52 yards

==== Week 4: at Buffalo Bills ====
Week 4: Minnesota Vikings at Buffalo Bills – Game summary

Quarter	1	2	3	4	Total
Vikings	7	3	3	10	23
Bills	3	0	3	21	27

at New Era Field, Orchard Park, New York

- Date: August 29
- Game time: 7:30 p.m. EDT/6:30 p.m. CDT
- Game weather: Sunny, 72 °F (22 °C)
- Game attendance: 57,765
- Referee: Shawn Smith (14)
- TV: KMSP
- Recap, Game Book

Game information

First quarter

- MIN – Ameer Abdullah 15-yard pass from Kyle Sloter (Kaare Vedvik kick), 5:57. Vikings 7–0. Drive: 8 plays, 47 yards, 4:22.
- BUF – Steven Hauschka 54-yard field goal, 1:05. Vikings 7–3. Drive: 10 plays, 39 yards, 4:52.

Second quarter

- MIN – Kaare Vedvik 27-yard field goal, 0:43. Vikings 10–3. Drive: 16 plays, 71 yards, 4:58.

Third quarter

- BUF – Chase McLaughlin 54-yard field goal, 8:58. Vikings 10–6. Drive: 12 plays, 40 yards, 6:02.
- MIN – Dan Bailey 54-yard field goal, 5:40. Vikings 13–6. Drive: 7 plays, 39 yards, 3:18.

Fourth quarter

- MIN – De'Angelo Henderson 3-yard run (Dan Bailey kick), 10:17. Vikings 20–6. Drive: 14 plays, 80 yards, 8:35.
- MIN – Dan Bailey 43-yard field goal, 7:41. Vikings 23–6. Drive: 4 plays, −8 yards, 1:46.
- BUF – Tyree Jackson 6-yard run (Chase McLaughlin kick), 3:53. Vikings 23–13. Drive: 12 plays, 75 yards, 3:48.
- BUF – Marcus Murphy 79-yard punt return (Chase McLaughlin kick), 3:21. Vikings 23–20.
- BUF – David Sills 8-yard pass from Tyree Jackson (Chase McLaughlin kick), 0:08. Bills 27–23. Drive: 6 plays, 57 yards, 0:53.

Top passers

- MIN – Kyle Sloter – 16/24, 163 yards, TD, INT
- BUF – Tyree Jackson – 22/33, 175 yards, TD

Top rushers

- MIN – De'Angelo Henderson – 16 rushes, 59 yards, TD
- BUF – Tyree Jackson – 8 rushes, 78 yards, TD

Top receivers

- MIN – Brandon Dillon – 5 receptions, 48 yards
- BUF – Ray-Ray McCloud – 5 receptions, 48 yards

== Regular season ==
=== Schedule ===
Week	Date	Opponent	Result	Record	Venue	Attendance	NFL.com recap
1	September 8	Atlanta Falcons	**W** 28–12	1–0	U.S. Bank Stadium	66,714	Recap
2	September 15	at **Green Bay Packers**	**L** 16–21	1–1	Lambeau Field	78,416	Recap
3	September 22	Oakland Raiders	**W** 34–14	2–1	U.S. Bank Stadium	66,738	Recap
4	September 29	at **Chicago Bears**	**L** 6–16	2–2	Soldier Field	62,131	Recap
5	October 6	at New York Giants	**W** 28–10	3–2	MetLife Stadium	75,041	Recap
6	October 13	Philadelphia Eagles	**W** 38–20	4–2	U.S. Bank Stadium	66,837	Recap
7	October 20	at **Detroit Lions**	**W** 42–30	5–2	Ford Field	60,314	Recap
8	October 24	Washington Redskins	**W** 19–9	6–2	U.S. Bank Stadium	66,776	Recap
9	November 3	at Kansas City Chiefs	**L** 23–26	6–3	Arrowhead Stadium	73,615	Recap
10	November 10	at Dallas Cowboys	**W** 28–24	7–3	AT&T Stadium	91,188	Recap
11	November 17	Denver Broncos	**W** 27–23	8–3	U.S. Bank Stadium	66,883	Recap
12	Bye						
13	December 2	at Seattle Seahawks	**L** 30–37	8–4	CenturyLink Field	69,080	Recap
14	December 8	**Detroit Lions**	**W** 20–7	9–4	U.S. Bank Stadium	66,776	Recap
15	December 15	at Los Angeles Chargers	**W** 39–10	10–4	Dignity Health Sports Park	25,446	Recap
16	December 23	**Green Bay Packers**	**L** 10–23	10–5	U.S. Bank Stadium	67,157	Recap
17	December 29	**Chicago Bears**	**L** 19–21	10–6	U.S. Bank Stadium	66,913	Recap

Note: Intra-division opponents are in bold text.

=== Game summaries ===
==== Week 1: vs. Atlanta Falcons ====
Week 1: Atlanta Falcons at Minnesota Vikings – Game summary

Quarter	1	2	3	4	Total
Falcons	0	0	0	12	**12**
**Vikings**	14	7	7	0	**28**

at U.S. Bank Stadium, Minneapolis, Minnesota

- Date: September 8
- Game time: 12:00 p.m. CDT
- Game weather: None (indoor stadium)
- Game attendance: 66,714
- Referee: Bill Vinovich (52)
- TV announcers (Fox): Thom Brennaman, Chris Spielman and Shannon Spake
- Recap, Game Book

Game information

**First quarter**

- MIN – Adam Thielen 23-yard pass from Kirk Cousins (Dan Bailey kick), 11:50. Vikings 7–0. **Drive: 2 plays, 21 yards, 1:03.**
- MIN – Dalvin Cook 19-yard run (Dan Bailey kick), 8:22. Vikings 14–0. **Drive: 4 plays, 41 yards, 1:33.**

**Second quarter**

- MIN – Kirk Cousins 1-yard run (Dan Bailey kick), 4:40. Vikings 21–0. **Drive: 10 plays, 79 yards, 5:41.**

**Third quarter**

- MIN – Dalvin Cook 7-yard run (Dan Bailey kick), 0:29. Vikings 28–0. **Drive: 6 plays, 80 yards, 2:39.**

**Fourth quarter**

- ATL – Calvin Ridley 20-yard pass from Matt Ryan (pass failed), 9:19. Vikings 28–6. **Drive: 8 plays, 66 yards, 3:16.**
- ATL – Julio Jones 2-yard pass from Matt Ryan (pass failed), 1:05. Vikings 28–12. **Drive: 12 plays, 71 yards, 3:23.**

**Top passers**

- ATL – Matt Ryan – 33/46, 304 yards, 2 TD, 2 INT
- MIN – Kirk Cousins – 8/10, 98 yards, TD

**Top rushers**

- ATL – Ito Smith – 6 rushes, 31 yards
- MIN – Dalvin Cook – 21 rushes, 111 yards, 2 TD

**Top receivers**

- ATL – Austin Hooper – 9 receptions, 77 yards
- MIN – Adam Thielen – 3 receptions, 43 yards, TD

==== Week 2: at Green Bay Packers ====
Week 2: Minnesota Vikings at Green Bay Packers – Game summary

Quarter	1	2	3	4	Total
Vikings	0	10	6	0	**16**
**Packers**	14	7	0	0	**21**

at Lambeau Field, Green Bay, Wisconsin

- Date: September 15
- Game time: 12:00 p.m. CDT
- Game weather: Cloudy, 72 °F (22 °C)
- Game attendance: 78,416
- Referee: John Hussey (35)
- TV announcers (Fox): Chris Myers, Daryl Johnston and Laura Okmin
- Recap, Game Book

Game information

**First quarter**

- GB – Jamaal Williams 15-yard pass from Aaron Rodgers (Mason Crosby kick), 12:50. Packers 7–0. **Drive: 4 plays, 75 yards, 2:10.**
- GB – Geronimo Allison 12-yard pass from Aaron Rodgers (Mason Crosby kick), 3:18. Packers 14–0. **Drive: 11 plays, 63 yards, 5:58.**

**Second quarter**

- GB – Aaron Jones 2-yard run (Mason Crosby kick), 14:16. Packers 21–0. **Drive: 4 plays, 33 yards, 2:00.**
- MIN – Dalvin Cook 75-yard run (Dan Bailey kick), 14:00. Packers 21–7. **Drive: 2 plays, 75 yards, 0:16.**
- MIN – Dan Bailey 31-yard field goal, 0:51. Packers 21–10. **Drive: 6 plays, 60 yards, 0:42.**

**Third quarter**

- MIN – Stefon Diggs 45-yard pass from Kirk Cousins (kick blocked), 9:12. Packers 21–16. **Drive: 3 plays, 42 yards, 0:55.**

**Fourth quarter**

- No scoring plays.

**Top passers**

- MIN – Kirk Cousins – 14/32, 230 yards, TD, 2 INT
- GB – Aaron Rodgers – 22/34, 209 yards, 2 TD

**Top rushers**

- MIN – Dalvin Cook – 20 rushes, 154 yards, TD
- GB – Aaron Jones – 23 rushes, 116 yards, TD

**Top receivers**

- MIN – Adam Thielen – 5 receptions, 75 yards
- GB – Davante Adams – 7 receptions, 106 yards

==== Week 3: vs. Oakland Raiders ====
Week 3: Oakland Raiders at Minnesota Vikings – Game summary

Quarter	1	2	3	4	Total
Raiders	0	7	0	7	**14**
**Vikings**	7	14	7	6	**34**

at U.S. Bank Stadium, Minneapolis, Minnesota

- Date: September 22
- Game time: 12:00 p.m. CDT
- Game weather: None (indoor stadium)
- Game attendance: 66,738
- Referee: Jerome Boger (23)
- TV announcers (Fox): Dick Stockton, Mark Schlereth and Jennifer Hale
- Recap, Game Book

Game information

**First quarter**

- MIN – Adam Thielen 35-yard pass from Kirk Cousins (Dan Bailey kick), 11:21. Vikings 7–0. **Drive: 6 plays, 76 yards, 3:39.**

**Second quarter**

- MIN – Dalvin Cook 1-yard run (Dan Bailey kick), 14:55. Vikings 14–0. **Drive: 12 plays, 79 yards, 5:25.**
- MIN – Adam Thielen 1-yard run (Dan Bailey kick), 11:06. Vikings 21–0. **Drive: 6 plays, 30 yards, 3:07.**
- OAK – J. J. Nelson 29-yard pass from Derek Carr (Daniel Carlson kick), 7:26. Vikings 21–7. **Drive: 7 plays, 75 yards, 3:40.**

**Third quarter**

- MIN – Alexander Mattison 10-yard run (Dan Bailey kick), 7:28. Vikings 28–7. **Drive: 10 plays, 92 yards, 5:25.**

**Fourth quarter**

- MIN – Dan Bailey 50-yard field goal, 14:55. Vikings 31–7. **Drive: 6 plays, 30 yards, 3:19.**
- MIN – Dan Bailey 24-yard field goal, 3:45. Vikings 34–7. **Drive: 7 plays, 53 yards, 4:44.**
- OAK – Tyrell Williams 11-yard pass from Derek Carr (Daniel Carlson kick), 1:23. Vikings 34–14. **Drive: 8 plays, 75 yards, 2:22.**

**Top passers**

- OAK – Derek Carr – 27/34, 242 yards, 2 TD, INT
- MIN – Kirk Cousins – 15/21, 174 yards, TD

**Top rushers**

- OAK – Josh Jacobs – 10 rushes, 44 yards
- MIN – Dalvin Cook – 16 rushes, 110 yards, TD

**Top receivers**

- OAK – Darren Waller – 13 receptions, 134 yards
- MIN – Irv Smith Jr. – 3 receptions, 60 yards

The Vikings earned their 500th win as a franchise, with an overall record of 500–427–11 at that point.

==== Week 4: at Chicago Bears ====
Week 4: Minnesota Vikings at Chicago Bears – Game summary

Quarter	1	2	3	4	Total
Vikings	0	0	0	6	**6**
**Bears**	7	3	6	0	**16**

at Soldier Field, Chicago, Illinois

- Date: September 29
- Game time: 3:25 p.m. CDT
- Game weather: Cloudy, 67 °F (19 °C)
- Game attendance: 62,131
- Referee: Brad Allen (122)
- TV announcers (CBS): Jim Nantz, Tony Romo and Tracy Wolfson
- Recap, Game Book

Game information

**First quarter**

- CHI – Tarik Cohen 10-yard pass from Chase Daniel (Eddy Piñeiro kick), 7:44. Bears 7–0. **Drive: 14 plays, 75 yards, 7:16.**

**Second quarter**

- CHI – Eddy Piñeiro 25-yard field goal, 0:00. Bears 10–0. **Drive: 16 plays, 72 yards, 6:36.**

**Third quarter**

- CHI – Eddy Piñeiro 38-yard field goal, 12:47. Bears 13–0. **Drive: 4 plays, −4 yards, 2:07.**
- CHI – Eddy Piñeiro 30-yard field goal, 3:04. Bears 16–0. **Drive: 9 plays, 67 yards, 4:59.**

**Fourth quarter**

- MIN – Dalvin Cook 2-yard run (pass failed), 2:58. Bears 16–6. **Drive: 13 plays, 92 yards, 4:08.**

**Top passers**

- MIN – Kirk Cousins – 27/36, 233 yards
- CHI – Chase Daniel – 22/30, 195 yards, TD

**Top rushers**

- MIN – Dalvin Cook – 14 rushes, 35 yards, TD
- CHI – David Montgomery – 21 rushes, 53 yards

**Top receivers**

- MIN – Stefon Diggs – 7 receptions, 108 yards
- CHI – Allen Robinson – 7 receptions, 77 yards

==== Week 5: at New York Giants ====
Week 5: Minnesota Vikings at New York Giants – Game summary

Quarter	1	2	3	4	Total
**Vikings**	3	15	7	3	**28**
Giants	0	7	3	0	**10**

at MetLife Stadium, East Rutherford, New Jersey

- Date: October 6
- Game time: 1:00 p.m. EDT/12:00 p.m. CDT
- Game weather: Cloudy, 66 °F (19 °C)
- Game attendance: 75,041
- Referee: Clete Blakeman (34)
- TV announcers (Fox): Sam Rosen, Charles Davis and Pam Oliver
- Recap, Game Book

Game information

**First quarter**

- MIN – Dan Bailey 31-yard field goal, 8:46. Vikings 3–0. **Drive: 11 plays, 62 yards, 6:14.**

**Second quarter**

- MIN – Adam Thielen 15-yard pass from Kirk Cousins (Dan Bailey kick), 14:55. Vikings 10–0. **Drive: 11 plays, 98 yards, 5:46.**
- NYG – Darius Slayton 35-yard pass from Daniel Jones (Aldrick Rosas kick), 12:08. Vikings 10–7. **Drive: 5 plays, 50 yards, 2:47.**
- MIN – Dan Bailey 48-yard field goal, 7:51. Vikings 13–7. **Drive: 8 plays, 45 yards, 4:17.**
- MIN – Jon Hilliman tackled in the end zone by Anthony Barr for a safety, 2:09. Vikings 15–7.
- MIN – Dan Bailey 32-yard field goal, 0:47. Vikings 18–7. **Drive: 9 plays, 49 yards, 1:22.**

**Third quarter**

- NYG – Aldrick Rosas 32-yard field goal, 7:35. Vikings 18–10. **Drive: 15 plays, 61 yards, 7:25.**
- MIN – Adam Thielen 9-yard pass from Kirk Cousins (Dan Bailey kick), 4:52. Vikings 25–10. **Drive: 5 plays, 67 yards, 2:43.**

**Fourth quarter**

- MIN – Dan Bailey 45-yard field goal, 4:09. Vikings 28–10. **Drive: 9 plays, 46 yards, 4:52.**

**Top passers**

- MIN – Kirk Cousins – 22/27, 306 yards, 2 TD
- NYG – Daniel Jones – 21/38, 182 yards, TD, INT

**Top rushers**

- MIN – Dalvin Cook – 21 rushes, 132 yards
- NYG – Jon Hilliman – 9 rushes, 20 yards

**Top receivers**

- MIN – Adam Thielen – 7 receptions, 130 yards, 2 TD
- NYG – Darius Slayton – 4 receptions, 62 yards, TD

==== Week 6: vs. Philadelphia Eagles ====
Week 6: Philadelphia Eagles at Minnesota Vikings – Game summary

Quarter	1	2	3	4	Total
Eagles	0	10	10	0	**20**
**Vikings**	10	14	7	7	**38**

at U.S. Bank Stadium, Minneapolis, Minnesota

- Date: October 13
- Game time: 12:00 p.m. CDT
- Game weather: None (indoor stadium)
- Game attendance: 66,837
- Referee: Scott Novak (1)
- TV announcers (Fox): Kenny Albert, Charles Davis and Pam Oliver
- Recap, Game Book

Game information

**First quarter**

- MIN – Adam Thielen 6-yard pass from Kirk Cousins (Dan Bailey kick), 7:43. Vikings 7–0. **Drive: 13 plays, 75 yards, 7:17.**
- MIN – Dan Bailey 39-yard field goal, 1:54. Vikings 10–0. **Drive: 9 plays, 35 yards, 3:36.**

**Second quarter**

- PHI – Jake Elliott 53-yard field goal, 12:10. Vikings 10–3. **Drive: 10 plays, 40 yards, 4:44.**
- MIN – Stefon Diggs 62-yard pass from Kirk Cousins (Dan Bailey kick), 11:39. Vikings 17–3. **Drive: 2 plays, 75 yards, 0:31.**
- MIN – Stefon Diggs 51-yard pass from Kirk Cousins (Dan Bailey kick), 9:31. Vikings 24–3. **Drive: 1 play, 51 yards, 0:08.**
- PHI – Miles Sanders 32-yard pass from Carson Wentz (Jake Elliott kick), 7:02. Vikings 24–10. **Drive: 5 plays, 75 yards, 2:29.**

**Third quarter**

- PHI – Alshon Jeffery 3-yard pass from Carson Wentz (Jake Elliott kick), 12:11. Vikings 24–17. **Drive: 6 plays, 75 yards, 2:49.**
- PHI – Jake Elliott 40-yard field goal, 6:19. Vikings 24–20. **Drive: 5 plays, 33 yards, 2:44.**
- MIN – Stefon Diggs 11-yard pass from Kirk Cousins (Dan Bailey kick), 1:16. Vikings 31–20. **Drive: 9 plays, 75 yards, 5:03.**

**Fourth quarter**

- MIN – Dalvin Cook 1-yard run (Dan Bailey kick), 8:17. Vikings 38–20. **Drive: 8 plays, 88 yards, 4:44.**

**Top passers**

- PHI – Carson Wentz – 26/40, 306 yards, 2 TD, INT
- MIN – Kirk Cousins – 22/29, 333 yards, 4 TD, INT

**Top rushers**

- PHI – Jordan Howard – 13 rushes, 49 yards
- MIN – Alexander Mattison – 14 rushes, 63 yards

**Top receivers**

- PHI – Miles Sanders – 3 receptions, 86 yards, TD
- MIN – Stefon Diggs – 7 receptions, 167 yards, 3 TD

==== Week 7: at Detroit Lions ====
Week 7: Minnesota Vikings at Detroit Lions – Game summary

Quarter	1	2	3	4	Total
**Vikings**	7	14	7	14	**42**
Lions	14	7	3	6	**30**

at Ford Field, Detroit, Michigan

- Date: October 20
- Game time: 1:00 p.m. EDT/12:00 p.m. CDT
- Game weather: None (indoor stadium)
- Game attendance: 60,314
- Referee: Brad Rogers (126)
- TV announcers (Fox): Brandon Gaudin, Chris Spielman and Shannon Spake
- Recap, Game Book

Game information

**First quarter**

- DET – Marvin Jones 16-yard pass from Matthew Stafford (Matt Prater kick), 7:34. Lions 7–0. **Drive: 7 plays, 77 yards, 3:03.**
- MIN – Adam Thielen 25-yard pass from Kirk Cousins (Dan Bailey kick), 5:14. Tied 7–7. **Drive: 5 plays, 73 yards, 2:20.**
- DET – Marvin Jones 3-yard pass from Matthew Stafford (Matt Prater kick), 0:13. Lions 14–7. **Drive: 9 plays, 75 yards, 5:01.**

**Second quarter**

- MIN – Bisi Johnson 1-yard pass from Kirk Cousins (Dan Bailey kick), 12:39. Tied 14–14. **Drive: 8 plays, 61 yards, 2:34.**
- MIN – Dalvin Cook 8-yard run (Dan Bailey kick), 3:26. Vikings 21–14. **Drive: 15 plays, 97 yards, 7:19.**
- DET – Marvin Jones 10-yard pass from Matthew Stafford (Matt Prater kick), 0:02. Tied 21–21. **Drive: 11 plays, 75 yards, 3:24.**

**Third quarter**

- MIN – C. J. Ham 5-yard pass from Kirk Cousins (Dan Bailey kick), 9:02. Vikings 28–21. **Drive: 12 plays, 75 yards, 5:58.**
- DET – Matt Prater 46-yard field goal, 3:22. Vikings 28–24. **Drive: 7 plays, 60 yards, 3:01.**

**Fourth quarter**

- MIN – Kyle Rudolph 15-yard pass from Kirk Cousins (Dan Bailey kick), 5:40. Vikings 35–24. **Drive: 6 plays, 59 yards, 3:12.**
- DET – Marvin Jones 2-yard pass from Matthew Stafford (pass failed), 3:05. Vikings 35–30. **Drive: 10 plays, 75 yards, 2:35.**
- MIN – Dalvin Cook 4-yard run (Dan Bailey kick), 1:55. Vikings 42–30. **Drive: 4 plays, 75 yards, 1:10.**

**Top passers**

- MIN – Kirk Cousins – 24/34, 337 yards, 4 TD
- DET – Matthew Stafford – 30/45, 364 yards, 4 TD, INT

**Top rushers**

- MIN – Dalvin Cook – 25 rushes, 142 yards, 2 TD
- DET – J. D. McKissic – 5 rushes, 29 yards

**Top receivers**

- MIN – Stefon Diggs – 7 receptions, 142 yards
- DET – Danny Amendola – 8 receptions, 105 yards

==== Week 8: vs. Washington Redskins ====
Week 8: Washington Redskins at Minnesota Vikings – Game summary

Quarter	1	2	3	4	Total
Redskins	0	6	3	0	**9**
**Vikings**	3	10	3	3	**19**

at U.S. Bank Stadium, Minneapolis, Minnesota

- Date: October 24
- Game time: 7:20 p.m. CDT
- Game weather: None (indoor stadium)
- Game attendance: 66,776
- Referee: Carl Cheffers (51)
- TV announcers (Fox/NFLN/Amazon Prime): Joe Buck, Troy Aikman, Erin Andrews and Kristina Pink
- Recap, Game Book

Game information

**First quarter**

- MIN – Dan Bailey 50-yard field goal, 5:20. Vikings 3–0. **Drive: 8 plays, 14 yards, 3:37.**

**Second quarter**

- WAS – Dustin Hopkins 21-yard field goal, 14:00. Tied 3–3. **Drive: 13 plays, 72 yards, 6:20.**
- MIN – Dan Bailey 29-yard field goal, 7:26. Vikings 6–3. **Drive: 10 plays, 64 yards, 6:34.**
- WAS – Dustin Hopkins 30-yard field goal, 1:57. Tied 6–6. **Drive: 11 plays, 63 yards, 5:29.**
- MIN – Dalvin Cook 4-yard run (Dan Bailey kick), 0:07. Vikings 13–6. **Drive: 7 plays, 75 yards, 1:50.**

**Third quarter**

- MIN – Dan Bailey 27-yard field goal, 8:33. Vikings 16–6. **Drive: 10 plays, 82 yards, 4:50.**
- WAS – Dustin Hopkins 43-yard field goal, 5:11. Vikings 16–9. **Drive: 6 plays, 50 yards, 3:22.**

**Fourth quarter**

- MIN – Dan Bailey 40-yard field goal, 10:36. Vikings 19–9. **Drive: 12 plays, 59 yards, 6:23.**

**Top passers**

- WAS – Case Keenum – 12/16, 130 yards
- MIN – Kirk Cousins – 23/26, 285 yards

**Top rushers**

- WAS – Adrian Peterson – 14 rushes, 76 yards
- MIN – Dalvin Cook – 23 rushes, 98 yards, TD

**Top receivers**

- WAS – Terry McLaurin – 4 receptions, 39 yards
- MIN – Stefon Diggs – 7 receptions, 143 yards

==== Week 9: at Kansas City Chiefs ====
Week 9: Minnesota Vikings at Kansas City Chiefs – Game summary

Quarter	1	2	3	4	Total
Vikings	7	3	6	7	**23**
**Chiefs**	7	3	10	6	**26**

at Arrowhead Stadium, Kansas City, Missouri

- Date: November 3
- Game time: 12:00 p.m. CST
- Game weather: Sunny, 54 °F (12 °C)
- Game attendance: 73,615
- Referee: Alex Kemp (55)
- TV announcers (Fox): Kevin Burkhardt, Charles Davis and Pam Oliver
- Recap, Game Book

Game information

**First quarter**

- KC – Tyreek Hill 40-yard pass from Matt Moore (Harrison Butker kick), 8:21. Chiefs 7–0. 'Drive: 7 plays, 67 yards
- MIN – Bisi Johnson 4-yard pass from Kirk Cousins (Dan Bailey kick), 2:50. Tied 7–7. **Drive: 12 plays, 75 yards, 5:31.**

**Second quarter**

- KC – Harrison Butker 24-yard field goal, 4:34. Chiefs 10–7. **Drive: 17 plays, 85 yards, 8:56.**
- MIN – Dan Bailey 29-yard field goal, 0:06. Tied 10–10. **Drive: 12 plays, 57 yards, 1:36.**

**Third quarter**

- MIN – Ameer Abdullah 16-yard pass from Kirk Cousins (kick failed, wide left), 11:51. Vikings 16–10. **Drive: 5 plays, 38 yards, 3:01.**
- KC – Damien Williams 91-yard run (Harrison Butker kick), 6:13. Chiefs 17–16. **Drive: 2 plays, 97 yards, 0:48.**
- KC – Harrison Butker 45-yard field goal, 0:30. Chiefs 20–16. **Drive: 7 plays, 39 yards, 2:58.**

**Fourth quarter**

- MIN – Kyle Rudolph 3-yard pass from Kirk Cousins (Dan Bailey kick), 10:59. Vikings 23–20. **Drive: 11 plays, 75 yards, 4:31.**
- KC – Harrison Butker 54-yard field goal, 2:30. Tied 23–23. **Drive: 8 plays, 38 yards, 4:05.**
- KC – Harrison Butker 44-yard field goal, 0:00. Chiefs 26–23. **Drive: 5 plays, 19 yards, 1:47.**

**Top passers**

- MIN – Kirk Cousins – 19/38, 220 yards, 3 TD
- KC – Matt Moore – 25/35, 275 yards, TD

**Top rushers**

- MIN – Dalvin Cook – 21 rushes, 71 yards
- KC – Damien Williams – 12 rushes, 125 yards, TD

**Top receivers**

- MIN – Laquon Treadwell – 3 receptions, 58 yards
- KC – Tyreek Hill – 6 receptions, 140 yards, TD

==== Week 10: at Dallas Cowboys ====
Week 10: Minnesota Vikings at Dallas Cowboys – Game summary

Quarter	1	2	3	4	Total
**Vikings**	14	3	11	0	**28**
Cowboys	0	14	7	3	**24**

at AT&T Stadium, Arlington, Texas

- Date: November 10
- Game time: 7:20 p.m. CST
- Game weather: Clear, 67 °F (19 °C) (retractable roof open)
- Game attendance: 91,188
- Referee: Shawn Hochuli (83)
- TV announcers (NBC): Al Michaels, Cris Collinsworth, Michele Tafoya and Terry McAulay
- Recap, Game Book

Game information

**First quarter**

- MIN – Kyle Rudolph 1-yard pass from Kirk Cousins (Dan Bailey kick), 9:25. Vikings 7–0. **Drive: 5 plays, 53 yards, 2:38.**
- MIN – Kyle Rudolph 1-yard pass from Kirk Cousins (Dan Bailey kick), 0:32. Vikings 14–0. **Drive: 13 plays, 90 yards, 6:19.**

**Second quarter**

- DAL – Michael Gallup 23-yard pass from Dak Prescott (Brett Maher kick), 8:08. Vikings 14–7. **Drive: 5 plays, 48 yards, 2:32.**
- DAL – Randall Cobb 22-yard pass from Dak Prescott (Brett Maher kick), 1:54. Tied 14–14. **Drive: 11 plays, 83 yards, 4:39.**
- MIN – Dan Bailey 26-yard field goal, 0:00. Vikings 17–14. **Drive: 9 plays, 67 yards, 1:54.**

**Third quarter**

- MIN – Dan Bailey 27-yard field goal, 9:38. Vikings 20–14. **Drive: 12 plays, 66 yards, 5:22.**
- DAL – Amari Cooper 12-yard pass from Dak Prescott (Brett Maher kick), 7:01. Cowboys 21–20. **Drive: 7 plays, 75 yards, 2:37.**
- MIN – Dalvin Cook 2-yard run (Kirk Cousins–Kyle Rudolph pass), 0:02. Vikings 28–21. **Drive: 13 plays, 75 yards, 6:59.**

**Fourth quarter**

- DAL – Brett Maher 23-yard field goal, 10:00. Vikings 28–24. **Drive: 13 plays, 70 yards, 5:02.**

**Top passers**

- MIN – Kirk Cousins – 23/32, 220 yards, 2 TD
- DAL – Dak Prescott – 28/46, 397 yards, 3 TD, INT

**Top rushers**

- MIN – Dalvin Cook – 26 rushes, 97 yards, TD
- DAL – Ezekiel Elliott – 20 rushes, 47 yards

**Top receivers**

- MIN – Dalvin Cook – 7 receptions, 86 yards
- DAL – Amari Cooper – 11 receptions, 147 yards, TD

==== Week 11: vs. Denver Broncos ====
Week 11: Denver Broncos at Minnesota Vikings – Game summary

Quarter	1	2	3	4	Total
Broncos	10	10	3	0	**23**
**Vikings**	0	0	7	20	**27**

at U.S. Bank Stadium, Minneapolis, Minnesota

- Date: November 17
- Game time: 12:00 p.m. CST
- Game weather: None (indoor stadium)
- Game attendance: 66,883
- Referee: Clay Martin (19)
- TV announcers (CBS): Kevin Harlan, Rich Gannon and Jay Feely
- Recap, Game Book

Game information

**First quarter**

- DEN – Brandon McManus 47-yard field goal, 11:32. Broncos 3–0. **Drive: 6 plays, 46 yards, 3:28.**
- DEN – Troy Fumagalli 3-yard pass from Brandon Allen (Brandon McManus kick), 4:39. Broncos 10–0. **Drive: 6 plays, 90 yards, 2:23.**

**Second quarter**

- DEN – Andy Janovich 1-yard run (Brandon McManus kick), 12:21. Broncos 17–0. **Drive: 10 plays, 69 yards, 5:06.**
- DEN – Brandon McManus 29-yard field goal, 1:06. Broncos 20–0. **Drive: 4 plays, 6 yards, 1:34.**

**Third quarter**

- MIN – Irv Smith Jr. 10-yard pass from Kirk Cousins (Dan Bailey kick), 11:29. Broncos 20–7. **Drive: 9 plays, 75 yards, 3:31.**
- DEN – Brandon McManus 41-yard field goal, 4:23. Broncos 23–7. **Drive: 12 plays, 52 yards, 7:06.**

**Fourth quarter**

- MIN – Dalvin Cook 3-yard run (pass failed), 13:25. Broncos 23–13. **Drive: 18 plays, 75 yards, 5:58.**
- MIN – Stefon Diggs 54-yard pass from Kirk Cousins (Dan Bailey kick), 10:21. Broncos 23–20. **Drive: 3 plays, 62 yards, 0:35.**
- MIN – Kyle Rudolph 32-yard pass from Kirk Cousins (Dan Bailey kick), 6:01. Vikings 27–23. **Drive: 5 plays, 67 yards, 2:14.**

**Top passers**

- DEN – Brandon Allen – 17/39, 240 yards, TD, INT
- MIN – Kirk Cousins – 29/35, 319 yards, 3 TD

**Top rushers**

- DEN – Phillip Lindsay – 16 rushes, 67 yards
- MIN – Dalvin Cook – 11 rushes, 26 yards, TD

**Top receivers**

- DEN – Courtland Sutton – 5 receptions, 113 yards
- MIN – Stefon Diggs – 5 receptions, 121 yards, TD

==== Week 13: at Seattle Seahawks ====
Week 13: Minnesota Vikings at Seattle Seahawks – Game summary

Quarter	1	2	3	4	Total
Vikings	7	10	0	13	**30**
**Seahawks**	7	3	17	10	**37**

at CenturyLink Field, Seattle, Washington

- Date: December 2
- Game time: 7:15 p.m. CST/5:15 p.m. PST
- Game weather: Clear, 51 °F (11 °C)
- Game attendance: 69,080
- Referee: Clete Blakeman (34)
- TV announcers (ESPN): Joe Tessitore, Booger McFarland, Lisa Salters and John Parry
- Recap, Game Book

Game information

**First quarter**

- MIN – Dalvin Cook 2-yard run (Dan Bailey kick), 8:12. Vikings 7–0. **Drive: 6 plays, 83 yards, 3:31.**
- SEA – Chris Carson 1-yard run (Jason Myers kick), 0:11. Tied 7–7. **Drive: 14 plays, 75 yards, 8:01.**

**Second quarter**

- MIN – Anthony Harris 20-yard interception return (Dan Bailey kick), 5:09. Vikings 14–7.
- SEA – Jason Myers 29-yard field goal, 0:58. Vikings 14–10. **Drive: 10 plays, 62 yards, 4:11.**
- MIN – Dan Bailey 47-yard field goal, 0:00. Vikings 17–10. **Drive: 8 plays, 46 yards, 0:58.**

**Third quarter**

- SEA – Rashaad Penny 1-yard run (Jason Myers kick), 9:02. Tied 17–17. **Drive: 9 plays, 71 yards, 4:20.**
- SEA – Jason Myers 29-yard field goal, 5:46. Seahawks 20–17. **Drive: 7 plays, 15 yards, 3:04.**
- SEA – David Moore 60-yard pass from Russell Wilson (Jason Myers kick), 0:05. Seahawks 27–17. **Drive: 5 plays, 76 yards, 2:54.**

**Fourth quarter**

- SEA – Rashaad Penny 13-yard pass from Russell Wilson (Jason Myers kick), 13:30. Seahawks 34–17. **Drive: 3 plays, 25 yards, 1:25.**
- MIN – Laquon Treadwell 58-yard pass from Kirk Cousins (Dan Bailey kick), 12:49. Seahawks 34–24. **Drive: 3 plays, 75 yards, 0:41.**
- MIN – Kyle Rudolph 3-yard pass from Kirk Cousins (Dan Bailey kick), 7:14. Seahawks 34–30. **Drive: 8 plays, 72 yards, 2:20.**
- SEA – Jason Myers 36-yard field goal, 0:21. Seahawks 37–30. **Drive: 7 plays, 24 yards, 2:06.**

**Top passers**

- MIN – Kirk Cousins – 22/38, 276 yards, 2 TD, INT
- SEA – Russell Wilson – 21/31, 240 yards, 2 TD, INT

**Top rushers**

- MIN – Dalvin Cook – 9 rushes, 29 yards, TD
- SEA – Chris Carson – 23 rushes, 102 yards, TD

**Top receivers**

- MIN – Laquon Treadwell – 1 reception, 58 yards, TD
- SEA – DK Metcalf – 6 receptions, 75 yards

==== Week 14: vs. Detroit Lions ====
Week 14: Detroit Lions at Minnesota Vikings – Game summary

Quarter	1	2	3	4	Total
Lions	0	0	0	7	**7**
**Vikings**	7	10	0	3	**20**

at U.S. Bank Stadium, Minneapolis, Minnesota

- Date: December 8
- Game time: 12:00 p.m. CST
- Game weather: None (indoor stadium)
- Game attendance: 66,776
- Referee: Walt Anderson (66)
- TV announcers (Fox): Thom Brennaman, Chris Spielman and Shannon Spake
- Recap, Game Book

Game information

**First quarter**

- MIN – Bisi Johnson 9-yard pass from Kirk Cousins (Dan Bailey kick), 5:47. Vikings 7–0. **Drive: 10 plays, 82 yards, 4:40.**

**Second quarter**

- MIN – Dan Bailey 27-yard field goal, 4:42. Vikings 10–0. **Drive: 9 plays, 56 yards, 5:12.**
- MIN – Dalvin Cook 3-yard run (Dan Bailey kick), 0:20. Vikings 17–0. **Drive: 6 plays, 65 yards, 0:46.**

**Third quarter**

- No scoring plays.

**Fourth quarter**

- MIN – Dan Bailey 50-yard field goal, 14:55. Vikings 20–0. **Drive: 9 plays, 32 yards, 4:29.**
- DET – Kenny Golladay 10-yard pass from David Blough (Matt Prater kick), 2:09. Vikings 20–7. **Drive: 12 plays, 75 yards, 3:30.**

**Top passers**

- DET – David Blough – 24/40, 205 yards, TD, 2 INT
- MIN – Kirk Cousins – 24/30, 242 yards, TD

**Top rushers**

- DET – Bo Scarbrough – 19 rushes, 65 yards
- MIN – Dalvin Cook – 18 rushes, 62 yards, TD

**Top receivers**

- DET – Kenny Golladay – 6 receptions, 58 yards, TD
- MIN – Stefon Diggs – 6 receptions, 92 yards

==== Week 15: at Los Angeles Chargers ====
Week 15: Minnesota Vikings at Los Angeles Chargers – Game summary

Quarter	1	2	3	4	Total
**Vikings**	6	13	6	14	**39**
Chargers	3	7	0	0	**10**

at Dignity Health Sports Park, Carson, California

- Date: December 15
- Game time: 3:05 p.m. CST/1:05 p.m. PST
- Game weather: Sunny, 64 °F (18 °C)
- Game attendance: 25,446
- Referee: Ronald Torbert (62)
- TV announcers (CBS): Greg Gumbel, Trent Green and Melanie Collins
- Recap, Game Book

Game information

**First quarter**

- MIN – Irv Smith Jr. 1-yard pass from Kirk Cousins (kick failed, hit right upright), 9:10. Vikings 6–0. **Drive: 10 plays, 75 yards, 5:50.**
- LAC – Michael Badgley 41-yard field goal, 4:35. Vikings 6–3. **Drive: 10 plays, 62 yards, 4:35.**

**Second quarter**

- MIN – Dan Bailey 26-yard field goal, 14:57. Vikings 9–3. **Drive: 4 plays, 4 yards, 1:29.**
- LAC – Mike Williams 2-yard pass from Philip Rivers (Michael Badgley kick), 8:42. Chargers 10–9. **Drive: 10 plays, 75 yards, 6:15.**
- MIN – Dan Bailey 44-yard field goal, 4:17. Vikings 12–10. **Drive: 10 plays, 49 yards, 4:25.**
- MIN – Ifeadi Odenigbo 56-yard fumble return (Dan Bailey kick), 0:07. Vikings 19–10.

**Third quarter**

- MIN – Dan Bailey 38-yard field goal, 12:37. Vikings 22–10. **Drive: 4 plays, 6 yards, 2:12.**
- MIN – Dan Bailey 27-yard field goal, 7:06. Vikings 25–10. **Drive: 7 plays, 32 yards, 4:03.**

**Fourth quarter**

- MIN – Mike Boone 8-yard run (Dan Bailey kick), 10:25. Vikings 32–10. **Drive: 7 plays, 85 yards, 4:30.**
- MIN – Mike Boone 2-yard run (Dan Bailey kick), 8:45. Vikings 39–10. **Drive: 3 plays, 10 yards, 1:32.**

**Top passers**

- MIN – Kirk Cousins – 19/25, 207 yards, TD, INT
- LAC – Philip Rivers – 28/39, 307 yards, TD, 3 INT

**Top rushers**

- MIN – Mike Boone – 13 rushes, 56 yards, 2 TD
- LAC – Melvin Gordon – 7 rushes, 28 yards

**Top receivers**

- MIN – Stefon Diggs – 4 receptions, 76 yards
- LAC – Keenan Allen – 9 receptions, 99 yards

==== Week 16: vs. Green Bay Packers ====
Week 16: Green Bay Packers at Minnesota Vikings – Game summary

Quarter	1	2	3	4	Total
**Packers**	3	6	8	6	**23**
Vikings	3	7	0	0	**10**

at U.S. Bank Stadium, Minneapolis, Minnesota

- Date: December 23
- Game time: 7:15 p.m. CST
- Game weather: None (indoor stadium)
- Game attendance: 67,157
- Referee: Bill Vinovich (52)
- TV announcers (ESPN): Joe Tessitore, Booger McFarland, Lisa Salters and John Parry
- Preview, Game Book

Game information

**First quarter**

- MIN – Dan Bailey 23-yard field goal, 13:11. Vikings 3–0. **Drive: 4 plays, 5 yards, 0:49.**
- GB – Mason Crosby 42-yard field goal, 2:00. Tied 3–3. **Drive: 9 plays, 49 yards, 4:04.**

**Second quarter**

- MIN – Stefon Diggs 21-yard pass from Kirk Cousins (Dan Bailey kick), 13:33. Vikings 10–3. **Drive: 3 plays, 26 yards, 1:19.**
- GB – Mason Crosby 33-yard field goal, 7:00. Vikings 10–6. **Drive: 13 plays, 60 yards, 6:33.**
- GB – Mason Crosby 19-yard field goal, 0:00. Vikings 10–9. **Drive: 8 plays, 54 yards, 0:55.**

**Third quarter**

- GB – Aaron Jones 12-yard run (Aaron Rodgers–Geronimo Allison pass), 2:03. Packers 17–10. **Drive: 8 plays, 53 yards, 5:09.**

**Fourth quarter**

- GB – Aaron Jones 56-yard run (kick failed, wide right), 5:51. Packers 23–10. **Drive: 3 plays, 75 yards, 1:49.**

**Top passers**

- GB – Aaron Rodgers – 26/40, 216 yards, INT
- MIN – Kirk Cousins – 16/31, 122 yards, TD, INT

**Top rushers**

- GB – Aaron Jones – 23 rushes, 154 yards, 2 TD
- MIN – Mike Boone – 11 rushes, 28 yards

**Top receivers**

- GB – Davante Adams – 13 receptions, 116 yards
- MIN – Stefon Diggs – 3 receptions, 57 yards, TD

==== Week 17: vs. Chicago Bears ====
Week 17: Chicago Bears at Minnesota Vikings – Game summary

Quarter	1	2	3	4	Total
**Bears**	6	5	7	3	**21**
Vikings	0	6	0	13	**19**

at U.S. Bank Stadium, Minneapolis, Minnesota

- Date: December 29
- Game time: 12:00 p.m. CST
- Game weather: None (indoor stadium)
- Game attendance: 66,913
- Referee: John Hussey (35)
- TV announcers (Fox): Dick Stockton, Mark Schlereth and Jennifer Hale
- Recap, Game Book

Game information

**First quarter**

- CHI – Eddy Piñeiro 26-yard field goal, 7:41. Bears 3–0. **Drive: 12 plays, 69 yards, 6:34.**
- CHI – Eddy Piñeiro 33-yard field goal, 0:44. Bears 6–0. **Drive: 10 plays, 24 yards, 5:33.**

**Second quarter**

- MIN – Dan Bailey 37-yard field goal, 9:17. Bears 6–3. **Drive: 14 plays, 56 yards, 6:27.**
- CHI – Mike Boone tackled in the end zone by Nick Kwiatkoski for a safety, 6:03. Bears 8–3.
- CHI – Eddy Piñeiro 34-yard field goal, 1:51. Bears 11–3. **Drive: 9 plays, 51 yards, 4:12.**
- MIN – Dan Bailey 38-yard field goal, 0:00. Bears 11–6. **Drive: 6 plays, 55 yards, 1:51.**

**Third quarter**

- CHI – David Montgomery 14-yard run (Eddy Piñeiro kick), 9:49. Bears 18–6. **Drive: 9 plays, 75 yards, 5:11.**

**Fourth quarter**

- MIN – Mike Boone 1-yard run (Dan Bailey kick), 14:13. Bears 18–13. **Drive: 8 plays, 43 yards, 3:47.**
- MIN – Dan Bailey 39-yard field goal, 8:54. Bears 18–16. **Drive: 9 plays, 59 yards, 4:20.**
- MIN – Dan Bailey 34-yard field goal, 4:53. Vikings 19–18. **Drive: 4 plays, 7 yards, 1:27.**
- CHI – Eddy Piñeiro 22-yard field goal, 0:10. Bears 21–19. **Drive: 15 plays, 71 yards, 4:43.**

**Top passers**

- CHI – Mitchell Trubisky – 26/37, 207 yards
- MIN – Sean Mannion – 12/21, 126 yards, 2 INT

**Top rushers**

- CHI – David Montgomery – 23 rushes, 113 yards, TD
- MIN – Mike Boone – 17 rushes, 148 yards, TD

**Top receivers**

- CHI – Allen Robinson – 9 receptions, 71 yards
- MIN – Alexander Hollins – 2 receptions, 46 yards

=== Standings ===
==== Division ====
NFC North
	W	L	T	PCT	DIV	CONF	PF	PA	STK
^{(2)} Green Bay Packers	13	3	0	.813	6–0	10–2	376	313	W5
^{(6)} Minnesota Vikings	10	6	0	.625	2–4	7–5	407	303	L2
Chicago Bears	8	8	0	.500	4–2	7–5	280	298	W1
Detroit Lions	3	12	1	.219	0–6	2–9–1	341	423	L9

==== Conference ====
NFC
#	Team	Division	W	L	T	PCT	DIV	CONF	SOS	SOV	STK
**Division leaders**
1 (Note: San Francisco finished ahead of Green Bay and New Orleans based on head-to-head sweep, claiming the No. 1 seed.)	San Francisco 49ers	West	13	3	0	.813	5–1	10–2	.504	.466	W2
2 (Note: Green Bay claimed the No. 2 seed over New Orleans based on conference record.)	Green Bay Packers	North	13	3	0	.813	6–0	10–2	.453	.428	W5
3	New Orleans Saints	South	13	3	0	.813	5–1	9–3	.486	.459	W3
4	Philadelphia Eagles	East	9	7	0	.563	5–1	7–5	.455	.417	W4
**Wild Cards**
5	Seattle Seahawks	West	11	5	0	.688	3–3	8–4	.531	.463	L2
6	Minnesota Vikings	North	10	6	0	.625	2–4	7–5	.477	.356	L2
**Did not qualify for the postseason**
7	Los Angeles Rams	West	9	7	0	.563	3–3	7–5	.535	.438	W1
8 (Note: Chicago finished ahead of Dallas based on head-to-head victory.)	Chicago Bears	North	8	8	0	.500	4–2	7–5	.508	.383	W1
9	Dallas Cowboys	East	8	8	0	.500	5–1	7–5	.479	.316	W1
10 (Note: Atlanta finished ahead of Tampa Bay based on division record.)	Atlanta Falcons	South	7	9	0	.438	4–2	6–6	.545	.518	W4
11	Tampa Bay Buccaneers	South	7	9	0	.438	2–4	5–7	.500	.384	L2
12	Arizona Cardinals	West	5	10	1	.344	1–5	3–8–1	.529	.375	L1
13	Carolina Panthers	South	5	11	0	.313	1–5	2–10	.549	.469	L8
14	New York Giants	East	4	12	0	.250	2–4	3–9	.473	.281	L1
15	Detroit Lions	North	3	12	1	.219	0–6	2–9–1	.506	.375	L9
16	Washington Redskins	East	3	13	0	.188	0–6	2–10	.502	.281	L4
**Tiebreakers** (Note: When breaking ties for three or more teams under the NFL's rules, they are first broken within divisions, then comparing only the highest-ranked remaining team from each division.)

== Postseason ==
=== Schedule ===
Round	Date	Opponent (seed)	Result	Record	Venue	Attendance	NFL.com recap
Wild Card	January 5, 2020	at New Orleans Saints (3)	W 26–20 (OT)	1–0	Mercedes-Benz Superdome	73,038	Recap
Divisional	January 11, 2020	at San Francisco 49ers (1)	L 10–27	1–1	Levi's Stadium	71,649	Recap

=== Game summaries ===
==== NFC Wild Card Playoffs: at (3) New Orleans Saints ====
NFC Wild Card Playoffs: (6) Minnesota Vikings at (3) New Orleans Saints – Game summary

Quarter	1	2	3	4	OT	Total
Vikings	3	10	7	0	6	26
Saints	3	7	0	10	0	20

at Mercedes-Benz Superdome, New Orleans, Louisiana

- Date: January 5, 2020
- Game time: 12:05 p.m. CST
- Game weather: None (indoor stadium)
- Game attendance: 73,038
- Referee: Carl Cheffers (51)
- TV announcers (Fox): Joe Buck, Troy Aikman, Erin Andrews and Chris Myers
- Recap, Game Book

Game information

First quarter

- NO – Wil Lutz 29-yard field goal, 9:52. Saints 3–0. Drive: 8 plays, 26 yards, 4:18.
- MIN – Dan Bailey 43-yard field goal, 4:05. Tied 3–3. Drive: 11 plays, 50 yards, 5:47.

Second quarter

- NO – Alvin Kamara 4-yard run (Wil Lutz kick), 9:18. Saints 10–3. Drive: 4 plays, 70 yards, 2:12.
- MIN – Dan Bailey 21-yard field goal, 2:54. Saints 10–6. Drive: 13 plays, 72 yards, 6:24.
- MIN – Dalvin Cook 5-yard run (Dan Bailey kick), 0:23. Vikings 13–10. Drive: 7 plays, 45 yards, 1:40.

Third quarter

- MIN – Dalvin Cook 1-yard run (Dan Bailey kick), 3:23. Vikings 20–10. Drive: 8 plays, 64 yards, 3:37.

Fourth quarter

- NO – Taysom Hill 20-yard pass from Drew Brees (Wil Lutz kick), 10:31. Vikings 20–17. Drive: 8 plays, 85 yards, 4:22.
- NO – Wil Lutz 49-yard field goal, 0:02. Tied 20–20. Drive: 7 plays, 39 yards, 1:53.

Overtime

- MIN – Kyle Rudolph 4-yard pass from Kirk Cousins, 10:40. Vikings 26–20. Drive: 9 plays, 75 yards, 4:20.

Top passers

- MIN – Kirk Cousins – 19/31, 242 yards, TD
- NO – Drew Brees – 26/33, 208 yards, TD, INT

Top rushers

- MIN – Dalvin Cook – 28 rushes, 94 yards, 2 TD
- NO – Taysom Hill – 4 rushes, 50 yards

Top receivers

- MIN – Adam Thielen – 7 receptions, 129 yards
- NO – Michael Thomas – 7 receptions, 70 yards

With a 20-10 lead entering the fourth quarter, the Saints managed to tie the game, and send it into overtime, making it the first time since the 2009 NFC Championship Game that the Vikings played in a playoff game that went into overtime. Coincidentally, it was also a road game against the Saints. It was also the second Wild Card game of the postseason to go into overtime. The Vikings got the ball first, and Kirk Cousins threw a pass to Adam Thielen for a 43-yard gain, which set them on the New Orleans 2-yard line. After losing two yards on the next two plays, Cousins found Kyle Rudolph at the back of the endzone for a 4-yard touchdown to win the game.

With this, the Vikings won their first playoff game on the road since their 31–17 victory over the Green Bay Packers in the 2004 Wild Card Round. As of 2025, this was the last time that the Vikings won a playoff game.

==== NFC Divisional Playoffs: at (1) San Francisco 49ers ====
NFC Divisional Playoffs: (6) Minnesota Vikings at (1) San Francisco 49ers – Game summary

Quarter	1	2	3	4	Total
Vikings	7	3	0	0	10
49ers	7	7	10	3	27

at Levi's Stadium, Santa Clara, California

- Date: January 11, 2020
- Game time: 3:35 p.m. CST/1:35 p.m. PST
- Game weather: Partly cloudy, 56 °F (13 °C)
- Game attendance: 71,649
- Referee: Walt Anderson (66)
- TV announcers (NBC): Al Michaels, Cris Collinsworth, Michele Tafoya and Terry McAulay
- Recap, Game Book

Game information

First quarter

- SF – Kendrick Bourne 3-yard pass from Jimmy Garoppolo (Robbie Gould kick), 9:30. 49ers 7–0. Drive: 8 plays, 61 yards, 4:11.
- MIN – Stefon Diggs 41-yard pass from Kirk Cousins (Dan Bailey kick), 5:23. Tied 7–7. Drive: 7 plays, 79 yards, 4:07.

Second quarter

- SF – Tevin Coleman 1-yard run (Robbie Gould kick), 7:10. 49ers 14–7. Drive: 10 plays, 53 yards, 5:35.
- MIN – Dan Bailey 39-yard field goal, 0:31. 49ers 14–10. Drive: 6 plays, 8 yards, 2:10.

Third quarter

- SF – Robbie Gould 35-yard field goal, 10:42. 49ers 17–10. Drive: 9 plays, 46 yards, 4:18.
- SF – Tevin Coleman 2-yard run (Robbie Gould kick), 4:54. 49ers 24–10. Drive: 8 plays, 44 yards, 4:55.

Fourth quarter

- SF – Robbie Gould 21-yard field goal, 14:13. 49ers 27–10. Drive: 4 plays, 7 yards, 1:52.

Top passers

- MIN – Kirk Cousins – 21/29, 172 yards, TD, INT
- SF – Jimmy Garoppolo – 11/19, 131 yards, TD, INT

Top rushers

- MIN – Dalvin Cook – 9 rushes, 18 yards
- SF – Tevin Coleman – 22 rushes, 105 yards, 2 TD

Top receivers

- MIN – Stefon Diggs – 2 receptions, 57 yards, TD
- SF – Deebo Samuel – 3 receptions, 42 yards

== Statistics ==
=== Team leaders ===
Category	Player(s)	Total
Passing yards	Kirk Cousins	3,603
Passing touchdowns	Kirk Cousins	26
Rushing yards	Dalvin Cook	1,135
Rushing touchdowns	Dalvin Cook	13
Receptions	Stefon Diggs	63
Receiving yards	Stefon Diggs	1,130
Receiving touchdowns	Adam Thielen	6
Points	Dan Bailey	121
Kickoff return yards	Ameer Abdullah	325
Punt return yards	Mike Hughes	104
Tackles	Eric Kendricks	110
Sacks	Danielle Hunter	14.5
Interceptions	Anthony Harris	6
Forced fumbles	Danielle Hunter; Harrison Smith	3

Source: Minnesota Vikings' official website

=== League rankings ===
Category	Total yards	Yards per game	NFL rank (out of 32)
Passing offense	2,314	231.4	17th
Rushing offense	1,530	153.0	3rd
Total offense	3,844	384.4	8th
Passing defense	2,419	241.9	18th
Rushing defense	912	91.2	7th
Total defense	3,331	333.1	13th

Source: NFL.com

== Pro Bowl ==
Three Vikings players were selected for the 2020 Pro Bowl when the initial rosters were announced on December 18, 2019: running back Dalvin Cook, safety Harrison Smith and defensive end Danielle Hunter. It was Smith's fifth Pro Bowl and Hunter's second, while Cook made his Pro Bowl debut. With the withdrawal of several NFC players, including San Francisco 49ers fullback Kyle Juszczyk, defensive end Nick Bosa and cornerback Richard Sherman, Green Bay Packers quarterback Aaron Rodgers, and Chicago Bears linebacker Khalil Mack, several Vikings were added to the roster for the Pro Bowl: fullback C. J. Ham, defensive end Everson Griffen, cornerback Xavier Rhodes, quarterback Kirk Cousins and linebacker Eric Kendricks. It was a first Pro Bowl appearance for Ham and Kendricks, a second for Cousins, a third for Rhodes and a fourth for Griffen.
