= Irv Smith Jr. =

American football player (born 1998)

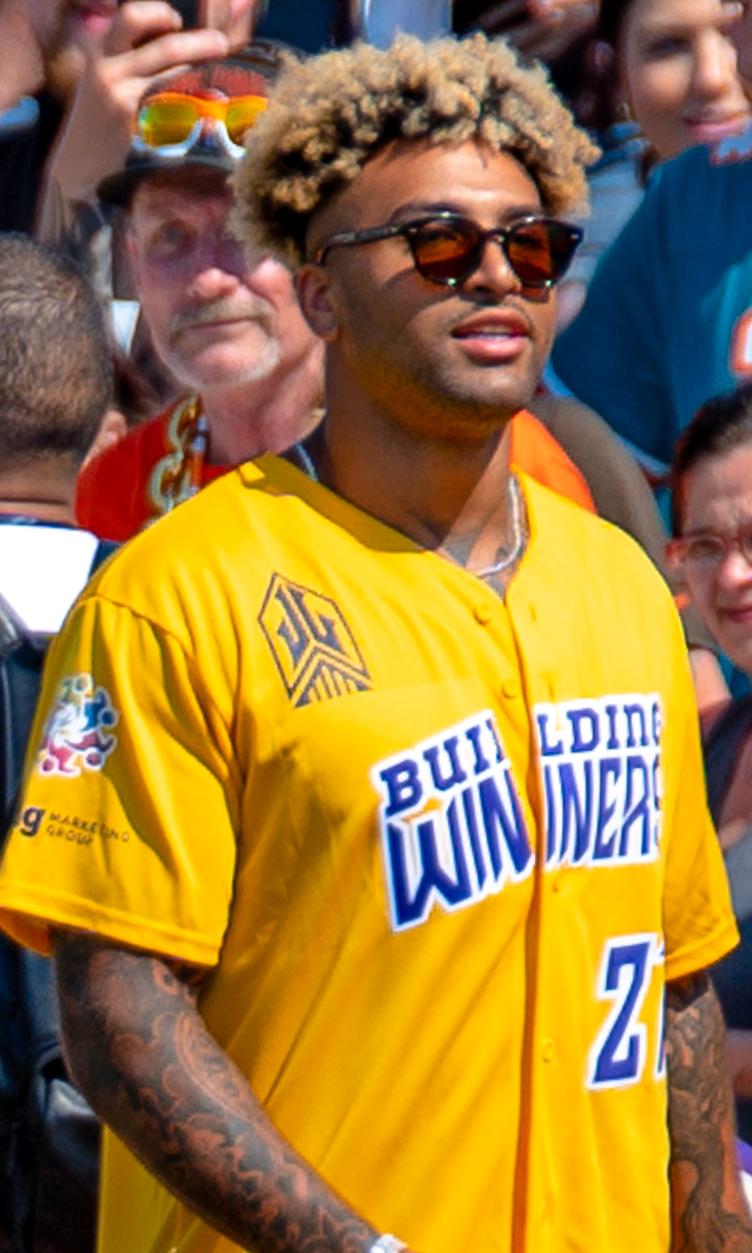
- Smith in 2021

Profile
- Position: Tight end

Personal information
- Born: August 9, 1998 (age 28); New Orleans, Louisiana, U.S.
- Listed height: 6 ft 2 in (1.88 m)
- Listed weight: 240 lb (109 kg)

Career information
- High school: Brother Martin (New Orleans)
- College: Alabama (2016–2018)
- NFL draft: 2019: 2nd round, 50th overall pick

Career history
- Minnesota Vikings (2019–2022); Cincinnati Bengals (2023); Kansas City Chiefs (2024)*; Houston Texans (2024–2025)
- * Offseason or practice squad member only

Awards and highlights
- CFP national champion (2017); Second-team All-SEC (2018)

Career NFL statistics
- Receptions: 109
- Receiving yards: 973
- Receiving touchdowns: 10
- Stats at Pro Football Reference

Irvin Martin Smith Jr. (born August 9, 1998) is an American professional football tight end. He played college football for the Alabama Crimson Tide and was selected in the second round of the 2019 NFL draft by the Minnesota Vikings. He also played for the Cincinnati Bengals and the Kansas City Chiefs.

== Early life ==
Smith was born in New Orleans, Louisiana on August 9, 1998. Shortly after being born, he moved to Arizona where he spent the first 14 years of his life. Smith moved back to New Orleans at age 14 and attended Brother Martin High School in New Orleans, Louisiana, where he played high school football. As a senior, he had 31 receptions for 558 yards and four touchdowns. He originally committed to Texas A&M University to play college football, but changed to the University of Alabama.

== College career ==
After not recording a reception as a true freshman at Alabama in 2016, Smith had 14 receptions for 128 yards and three touchdowns over 14 games as a sophomore in 2017. He returned to Alabama as a starter in 2018. On January 11, 2019, Smith announced that he would declare for the 2019 NFL draft.

=== College statistics ===
Season	Team	GP	Rec	Yds	Avg	TD
2017	Alabama	9	14	128	9.1	3
2018	Alabama	15	44	710	16.1	7
Career		24	58	838	14.4	10

== Professional career ==
Pre-draft measurables
Height	Weight	Arm length	Hand span	40-yard dash	10-yard split	20-yard split	20-yard shuttle	Three-cone drill	Vertical jump	Broad jump	Bench press
6 ft 2 3/8 in (1.89 m)	242 lb (110 kg)	31 1/2 in (0.80 m)	9 1/2 in (0.24 m)	4.63 s	1.68 s	2.74 s	4.33 s	7.32 s	32.5 in (0.83 m)	9 ft 2 in (2.79 m)	19 reps
All values from NFL Combine

=== Minnesota Vikings ===
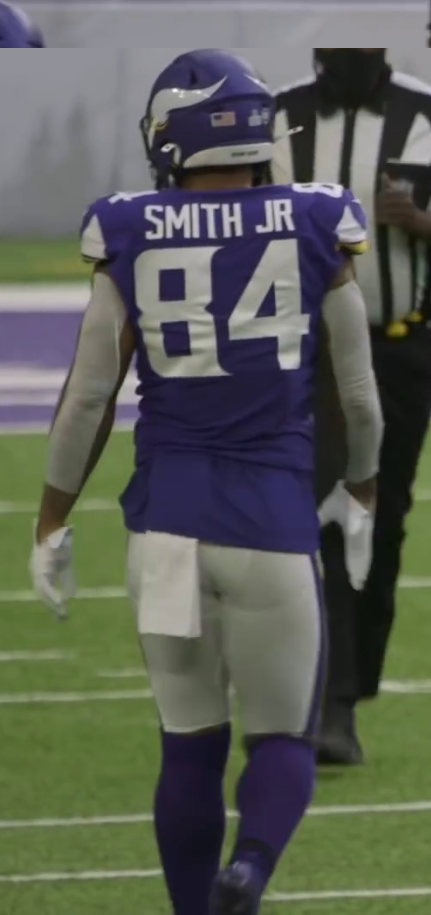
Smith Jr. in 2020

==== 2019 ====
Smith was drafted by the Minnesota Vikings in the second round with the 50th overall pick in the 2019 NFL Draft. Smith made his NFL debut in Week 1 against the Atlanta Falcons but did not record any meaningful statistics. He recorded his first reception in the next game against the Green Bay Packers. He recorded a season-high and team-leading 60 receiving yards on three receptions against the Oakland Raiders in the following game. He scored his first touchdown in Week 11 against the Denver Broncos on a 10-yard reception from Kirk Cousins. Overall, as a rookie, he appeared in all 16 games and started six. He recorded 36 receptions for 311 receiving yards and two receiving touchdowns.

==== 2020 ====
In Week 9, against the Detroit Lions, Smith had two receiving touchdowns in the same game for his first multi-touchdown game as a professional. In Week 16 against the New Orleans Saints on Christmas Day, Smith had two receiving touchdowns during the 52–33 loss. He finished the 2020 season with 30 receptions for 365 receiving yards and five receiving touchdowns in 13 games and seven starts.

==== 2021 ====
On September 1, 2021, it was revealed that Smith underwent surgery to repair a torn meniscus, which prevented him from playing for the entire 2021 season. He was placed on injured reserve that same day.

==== 2022 ====
On November 1, 2022, Smith was placed on injured reserve after suffering an ankle injury in the Week 8 win over the Arizona Cardinals. In the 2022 season, Smith had 25 receptions for 182 receiving yards and two receiving touchdowns in eight games and one start. He was activated on January 7, 2023. During the Vikings' Wild Card Round loss to the New York Giants, Smith had a receiving touchdown.

=== Cincinnati Bengals ===
On March 30, 2023, Smith signed a one-year, $1.75 million deal with the Cincinnati Bengals. He was named the starting tight end on the depth chart to begin the season. Smith suffered a hamstring injury during the Bengals' Week 3 win against the Los Angeles Rams.

He caught his first touchdown pass of the season in Week 9 against the Buffalo Bills. He appeared in 12 games in the 2023 season. He had 18 receptions for 115 yards and a touchdown.

=== Kansas City Chiefs ===
Smith signed with the Kansas City Chiefs on March 14, 2024. He was released by the Chiefs on August 27 as part of final roster cuts.

=== Houston Texans ===
On September 18, 2024, Smith was signed to the Houston Texans practice squad. He was promoted to the active roster on December 20.

On April 21, 2025, Smith re-signed with the Texans on a one-year contract. He was released from injured reserve on September 29.

=== Louisville Kings ===
On January 14, 2026, Smith was selected by the Louisville Kings of the United Football League (UFL).

== Personal life ==
Smith's father, Irv Sr., played tight end in the NFL for nine seasons.

== Career NFL statistics ==
=== Regular season ===
Year	Team	Games		Receiving						Fumbles	
Year	Team	GP	GS	Tgt	Rec	Yds	Avg	Lng	TD	Fum	Lost
2019	MIN	16	7	47	36	311	8.6	29	2	1	0
2020	MIN	13	7	43	30	365	12.2	36	5	0	0
2021	MIN	DNP									
2022	MIN	8	1	36	25	182	7.3	17	2	1	1
2023	CIN	12	6	26	18	115	6.4	14	1	1	1
Career		49	21	152	109	973	8.9	36	10	3	2

=== Postseason ===
Year	Team	Games		Receiving						Fumbles	
Year	Team	GP	GS	Tgt	Rec	Yds	Avg	Lng	TD	Fum	Lost
2019	MIN	2	1	3	3	39	13.0	21	0	0	0
2022	MIN	1	0	2	1	3	3.0	3	1	0	0
Career		3	1	5	4	42	8.0	21	1	0	0
