= Stefon Diggs =

American football player (born 1993)

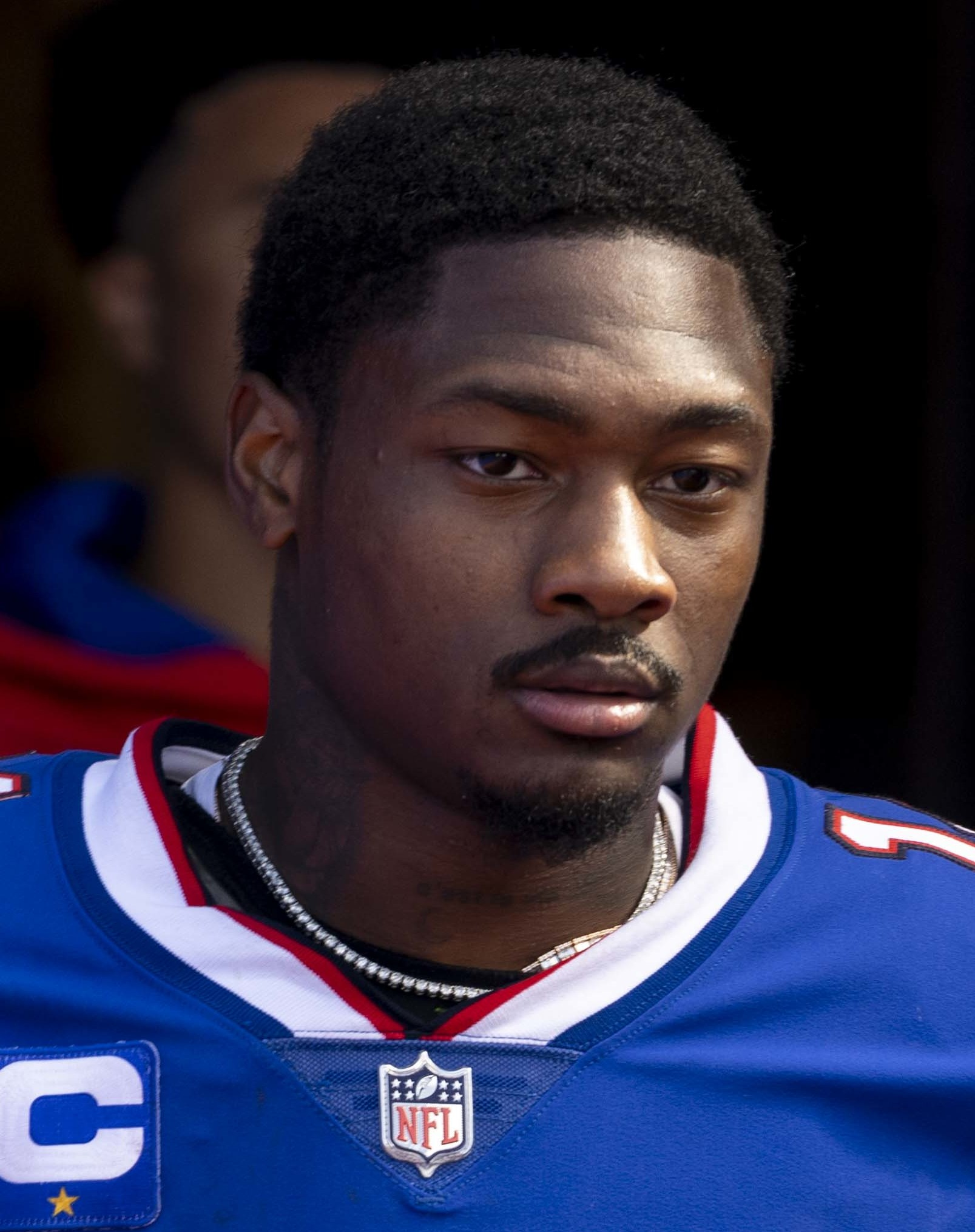
- Diggs with the Buffalo Bills in 2021

No. 3 – Washington Commanders
- Position: Wide receiver
- Roster status: Active

Personal information
- Born: November 29, 1993 (age 32); Gaithersburg, Maryland, U.S.
- Listed height: 6 ft 0 in (1.83 m)
- Listed weight: 191 lb (87 kg)

Career information
- High school: Good Counsel (Olney, Maryland)
- College: Maryland (2012–2014)
- NFL draft: 2015: 5th round, 146th overall pick

Career history
- Minnesota Vikings (2015–2019); Buffalo Bills (2020–2023); Houston Texans (2024); New England Patriots (2025); Washington Commanders (2026–present)

Awards and highlights
- First-team All-Pro (2020); Second-team All-Pro (2022); 4× Pro Bowl (2020–2023); NFL receptions leader (2020); NFL receiving yards leader (2020); PFWA All-Rookie Team (2015); Second-team All-Big Ten (2014)

Career NFL statistics as of Week 10, 2026
- Receptions: 978
- Receiving yards: 11,890
- Receiving touchdowns: 80
- Stats at Pro Football Reference

Stefon Marsean Diggs (born November 29, 1993) is an American professional football wide receiver for the Washington Commanders of the National Football League (NFL). Diggs played college football for the Maryland Terrapins and was selected by the Minnesota Vikings in the fifth round of the 2015 NFL draft. He became part of a receiving tandem with the Vikings alongside Adam Thielen, with his highlights including catching the "Minneapolis Miracle" pass during the 2017–18 NFL playoffs.

The following offseason, Diggs received a 5-year extension before being traded to the Buffalo Bills in 2020. With the Bills, he became the fastest receiver to surpass 100 catches with his new team and broke Eric Moulds's franchise record for receiving yards in a season. Diggs led all NFL receivers in 2020 with 127 receptions and 1,535 receiving yards. He has also played for the Houston Texans and New England Patriots, appearing in Super Bowl LX with the latter.

== Early life ==
Diggs attended Our Lady of Good Counsel High School in Montgomery County, Maryland, where he played football and ran track. He recorded 810 yards receiving with 23 touchdowns as a junior in 2010, and was runner-up for the Gatorade Maryland Player of the Year. As a senior, he recorded 770 yards receiving and 8 touchdowns, and racked up 277 rushing yards and three more touchdowns on the ground; he also saw time on defense, recording 31.5 tackles, 5.5 tackles for loss, and 1 sack. In recognition of his efforts, he was a first team All-metro selection at wide receiver by The Washington Post and All-county selection by the Montgomery Gazette. Following his senior season, he was named MVP of the U.S. Army All-American Junior Combine in 2011 and was invited to play in the 2012 U.S. Army All-American Bowl.

In track and field, Diggs competed as a sprinter. In 2011, he placed 7th in the 100-meter dash in the prelims of the Bill Carver T&F Classic with a time of 12.00 seconds and helped lead his 4 × 200 m team to a third-place finish with a time of 1:32.10 minutes. The members of that relay consisted of fellow NFL players Kendall Fuller, Blake Countess, and a National Champion 400m sprinter Sean Sutton. As a senior, he recorded a personal-best time of 22.30 seconds in the 200-meter dash at the Darius Ray Invitational and ran a third leg on the 4 × 100 m squad, helping the Falcons earn a second-place finish with a time of 43.50 seconds. He was also timed at 4.43 seconds in the 40-yard dash.

A consensus five-star college recruit, Diggs was viewed as one of the best players in the nation. He was considered the second-best wide receiver recruit in the nation and was rated as the No.1 recruit in the state of Maryland by Rivals.com. He was ranked as the No. 13 prospect in the nation and the No. 3 athlete in the class of 2012 by ESPN.com. Scout.com rated him as the No. 2 wide receiver prospect in the nation. Diggs chose to stay close to home and committed to the University of Maryland on February 10, 2012. He also had scholarship offers from Florida, USC, Cal, Ohio State, and Auburn, among others.

== College career ==
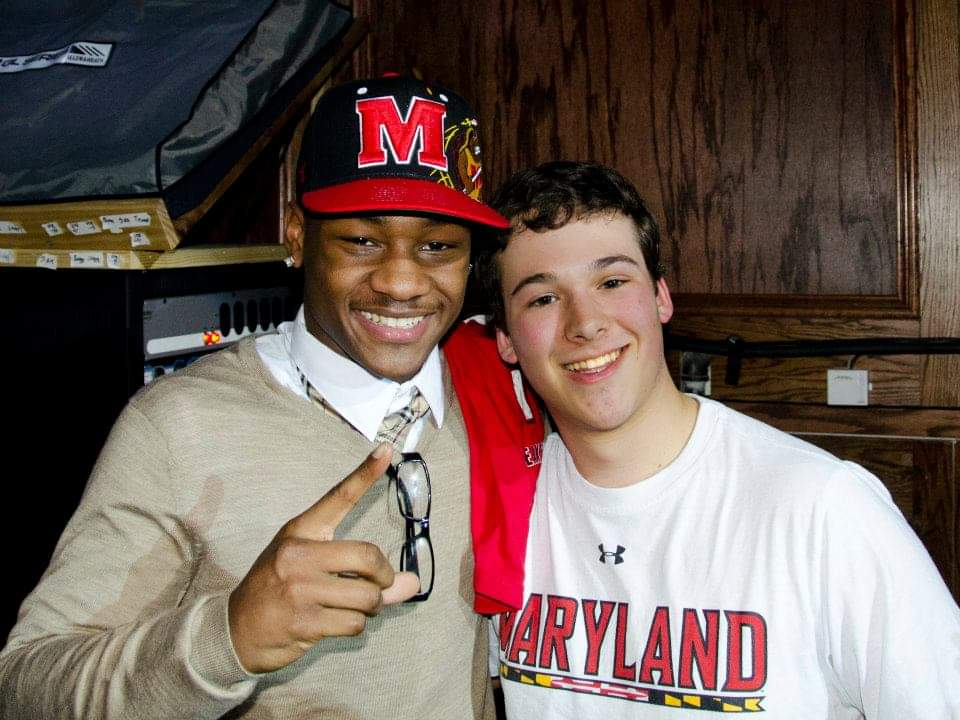
Diggs with a fan after committing to Maryland

Diggs accepted an athletic scholarship to attend the University of Maryland in College Park, where he played on coach Randy Edsall's Maryland Terrapins football team from 2012 to 2014.

=== Freshman season (2012) ===
As a true freshman in 2012, Diggs played in 11 of Maryland's 12 games at wide receiver and on special teams, missing just one game, due to an ankle injury. He ranked second in the Atlantic Coast Conference (ACC) and eighth nationally with 172.4 all-purpose yards per game, while his 1,896 all-purpose yards were the second most in a single season in school history, trailing only Torrey Smith, who posted 2,192 yards in 2009. He ranked fifth in the conference in receiving yards (77.1/game), second in kick return average (28.5), and fifth in punt return average (10.0). He led the team in receptions (54), receiving yards (848), and touchdown receptions (6). In his first collegiate game against William & Mary, he caught three passes for 30 yards and returned three punts for a total of 50 yards. He totaled 223 all-purpose yards, which came on 57 receiving yards, 68 yards on five punt returns and 98 yards on three kickoff returns against Connecticut. For his performance against West Virginia, he received ACC Rookie of the Week honors after posting 201 all-purpose yards, including three receptions for 113 yards and two touchdowns, 63 yards on three kickoff returns and 25 yards on four punt returns. He started at wide receiver vs. Wake Forest, and recorded a second straight 100-yard receiving game with 105 yards on five receptions; his 63-yard reception in the fourth quarter was the longest by a Terp for the season and set up the game-winning touchdown by Justus Pickett. He earned ACC Rookie of the Week honors for his play. Against Virginia, he caught four passes for 89 yards (including a long of 60 yards) and totaled 147 yards on three kickoff returns (one for a 100-yard touchdown), recording 239 all-purpose yards and earning ACC Specialist of the Week honors. He totaled 152 yards on a season-high 11 receptions, including a 66-yard touchdown against Boston College, earning ACC Rookie of the Week for the third time. He recorded eight catches for 82 yards at North Carolina, had four kick returns for 146 yards, including a 99-yard touchdown return to open the second half. He also completed his first career pass for an eight-yard touchdown at the end of the first half. He finished second to Miami's Duke Johnson in the ACC Freshman of the Year voting.

=== Sophomore season (2013) ===
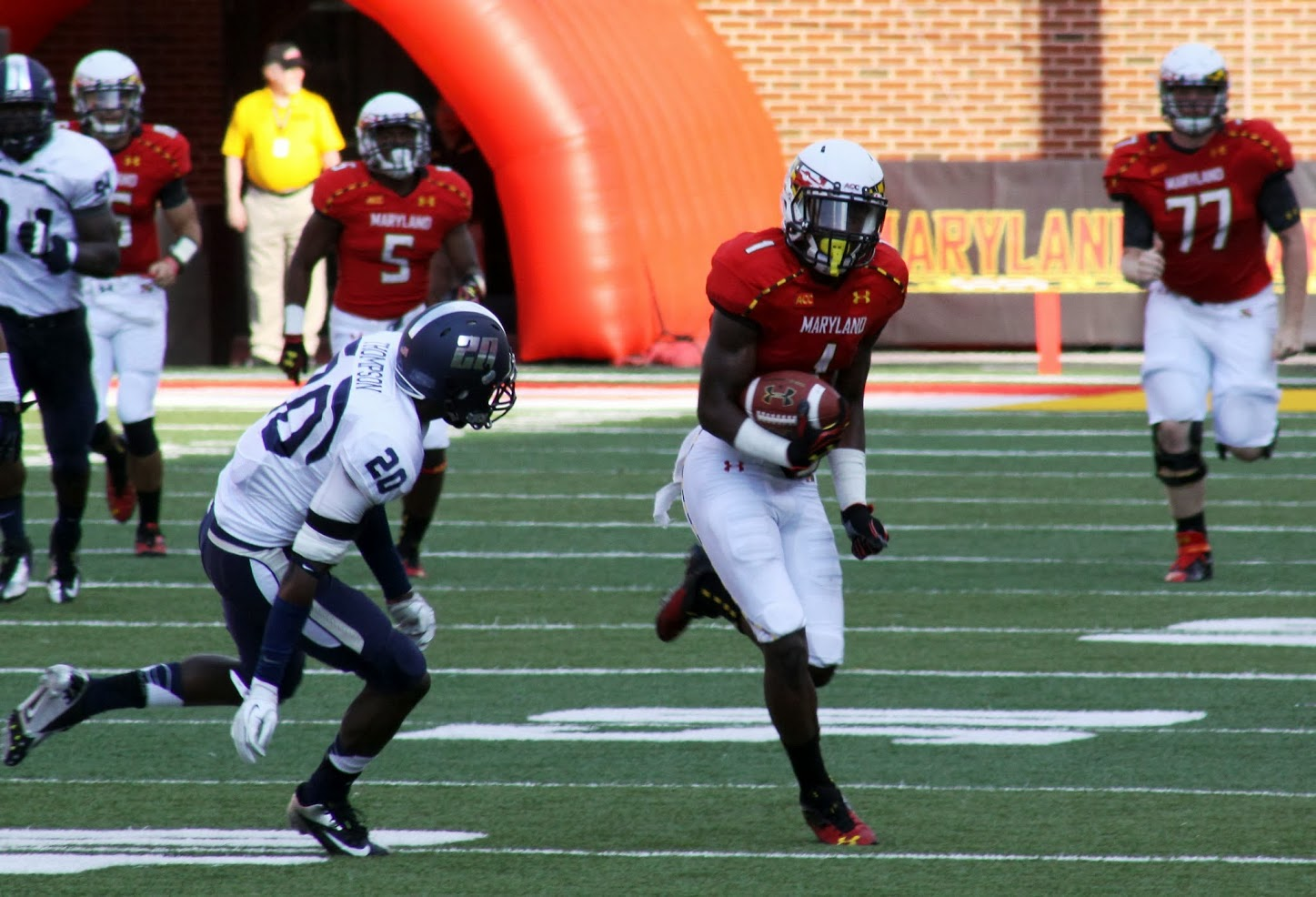
Diggs in a game against the Old Dominion Monarchs in 2013

As a sophomore in 2013, Diggs played in only seven games, missing the final six games of the season after suffering a season-ending injury at Wake Forest. He was an honorable mention All-ACC selection by the media and coaches despite the injury. He began his sophomore campaign with an impressive game against FIU, recording 98 yards receiving and one touchdown and 70 return yards on three kickoffs. His impressive play carried over against Old Dominion by recording a career-best 179 yards receiving and a touchdown, earning ACC Receiver of the Week honors for his play. He had 110 receiving yards and a touchdown against Connecticut. However, in Maryland's 34–10 loss to Wake Forest, Diggs broke his right fibula, ending his season. In that game, Diggs managed to pull in eight catches for 67 yards. For the season, he hauled in 34 passes for 587 yards and 3 touchdowns.

=== Junior season (2014) ===
As a junior, in his final season at Maryland, Diggs played in 10 games but again missed games due to injury. He earned second team All-Big Ten Conference honors from the coaches and was named an honorable mention All-Big Ten honoree by the media. He led the team in receptions with 62, receiving yards with 792 and receiving touchdowns with five all in ten games. He had three 100-yard receiving games for the season, which tied for fourth in the conference. He hauled in five balls for 127 yards, including a 77-yard touchdown (the longest touchdown reception of his career) against West Virginia on September 13. He brought in six catches for 112 yards and a touchdown at Indiana. He posted a team-high seven catches for 52 yards and a score against Ohio State. He tallied a team-high nine receptions for 130 yards and took a short screen pass 53 yards for a touchdown against Iowa. He missed the Michigan State game due to suspension and the final two games due to a lacerated kidney. In his first game since suffering a lacerated kidney on November 1, Diggs was one of the few bright spots during Maryland's 45–21 loss to Stanford; he had 10 catches for 138 yards, including a 26-yard catch-and-run that helped set up the Terps's first touchdown.

== Professional career ==
=== Pre-draft ===
After his junior season, Diggs decided to forgo his senior season and entered the 2015 NFL draft.

External videos
- Diggs' NFL Combine workout
- Diggs gets drafted by Minnesota

Pre-draft measurables
Height	Weight	Arm length	Hand span	Wingspan	40-yard dash	10-yard split	20-yard split	20-yard shuttle	Three-cone drill	Vertical jump	Broad jump	Bench press
6 ft 0 in (1.83 m)	195 lb (88 kg)	31 1/4 in (0.79 m)	10 in (0.25 m)	6 ft 3 3/4 in (1.92 m)	4.46 s	1.53 s	2.58 s	4.11 s	7.03 s	35 in (0.89 m)	9 ft 7 in (2.92 m)	11 reps
All values from NFL Combine, short shuttle and bench from Pro Day

Diggs (6 ft 0 in (1.83 m), 195 pounds (88 kg)) ran the 40-yard dash in 4.46 seconds at the 2015 NFL Combine and stood on those numbers at his Pro Day. He ran the 20-yard shuttle in 4.11 seconds and also had a 60-yard long shuttle time of 11.46 seconds.

=== Minnesota Vikings ===
==== 2015 season ====
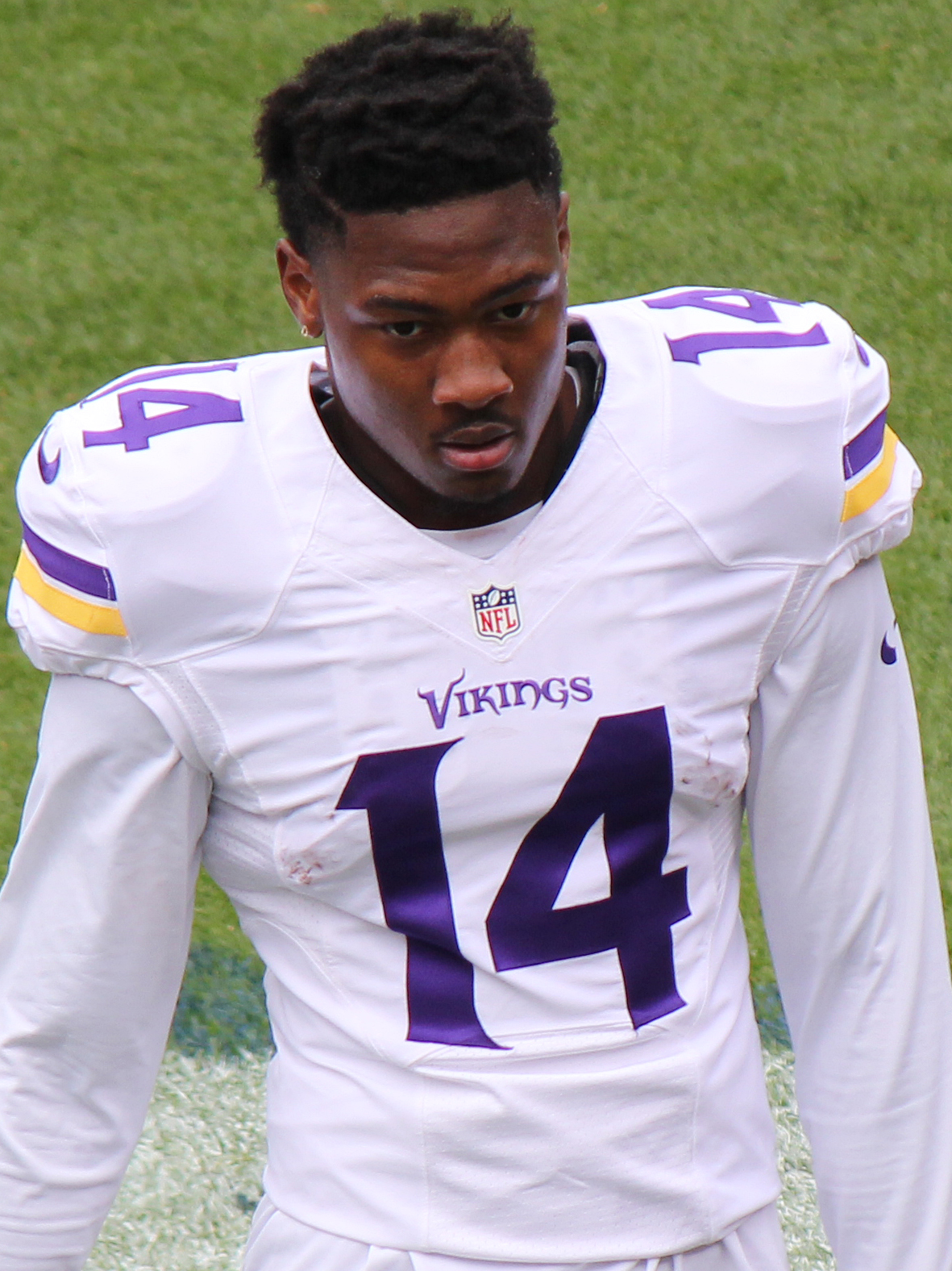
Diggs with the Minnesota Vikings in 2015

Diggs was selected in the fifth round with the 146th overall pick by the Minnesota Vikings in the 2015 NFL draft. He signed a four-year, $2.5 million deal that included a guaranteed $227,000 signing bonus. Diggs was inactive during the Vikings's first three games of the season. He got his first chance to play in Week 4 against the Denver Broncos because of injuries to receivers Charles Johnson and Jarius Wright and responded with six catches on ten targets and a team-high 87 yards in Minnesota's 23–20 loss at Denver. In his first career start against the Kansas City Chiefs in Week 6, Diggs took full advantage to become the first Vikings's receiver since Week 14 in the previous season to record a 100-yard game, finishing with seven catches for 129 yards, including a 30-yard reception on a crucial third-down. Diggs officially received the starting wide receiver role, opposite that of teammate Mike Wallace, against the Detroit Lions in Week 7. Diggs put up his second straight 100-yard game, hauling in six passes for 108 yards; in the third quarter, Diggs beat veteran cornerback Rashean Mathis with a double move then laid out to make a highlight-reel 36-yard touchdown catch in the end zone, the first of his NFL career. Since Randy Moss in 1998, Diggs was the first Vikings rookie to record consecutive 100-yard games, and 80 or more receiving yards in his first three games. In the Vikings's 23–20 win over the Chicago Bears in Week 8, Diggs recorded his fourth consecutive game with at least five catches and 80 yards. On a crucial third-down play with only 2:00 left, Diggs caught a short pass from Teddy Bridgewater at the 30-yard line, then he spun around cornerback Sherrick McManis and turned upfield over his right shoulder with open space in front of him. He shook a defender at the five-yard line and dove past another into the end zone, tying the game 20–20. Diggs wound up being the Vikings's leading receiver, hauling in six catches for 95 yards and a 40-yard touchdown. Diggs's yardage over four games ranks him second among all NFL players in their first four career games since 1960, behind only Anquan Boldin's 464 yards in 2003.

In Week 9, Diggs led the team in receptions (3) and yards (42) and recovered a fumble by Adrian Peterson in the Vikings's overtime win over the St. Louis Rams. Diggs recorded two receptions for 46 yards in the Vikings week 10 win over the Oakland Raiders. In the Vikings's loss to Green Bay in Week 11, Diggs topped the 50-yard receiving mark for the first time in three weeks, recording six receptions for 66 yards. In Week 12, against the Atlanta Falcons, Diggs recorded four receptions for 31 yards. During the game, he had an unsportsmanlike conduct penalty due to his celebration of spinning the ball into Falcons's safety Charles Godfrey after his 16-yard reception in converting a 3rd & 8. After a quiet six-game streak, Diggs re-emerged in Week 15 against the Chicago Bears; he hauled in three receptions for 55 yards with a career-high two touchdowns that helped the Vikings defeat the Bears 38–17. He caught his first of the day in Minnesota's first drive on a 15-yard pass in the back-left corner of the end zone from Bridgewater for a 7–0 lead. On his second score, Bridgewater found him on a short crossing pattern across the middle on third down and Diggs accelerated towards the sidelines, juked one defender and carried another on his back for seven yards to complete a 33-yard catch and run that put the Vikings up 24–7. On January 19, 2016, Diggs was named to the Pro Football Writers of America's (PFWA) 2015 NFL All-Rookie team. Despite being inactive for the first three games of the 2015 campaign, Diggs led the Vikings in receptions with 52 and receiving yards with 720 yards including 13 receptions of 20+ yards. It was the 2nd-most receiving yardage by a rookie that year behind Raiders's wideout Amari Cooper (1,070).

==== 2016 season ====
In the season opening game at the Tennessee Titans on September 11, Diggs led the Vikings with seven catches for 103 yards on nine targets. Despite being listed as the team's No. 2 wide receiver behind Charles Johnson, Diggs still led the team in targets, receptions, and yards as the Vikings were forced to throw more than expected with the Titans bottling up the running game. In Week 2, Diggs posted another stellar performance against the Packers on Sunday Night Football. With the Packers stacking the box to stop the running game, Diggs exploited man-to-man coverage from second-year cornerback Damarious Randall and became the focal point of the offense, playing a key role in the Vikings's 17–14 win over the Packers as he finished the game with career-highs in both catches with nine and receiving yards with 182. This game was Sam Bradford's first as a Viking, and the team's first in the new U.S. Bank Stadium. He was named NFC Offensive Player of the Week, becoming the ninth different Viking to earn NFC Player of the Week honors under head coach Mike Zimmer. Combining his 182 yards with his 103-yard performance at Tennessee in Week 1, Diggs became only the third receiver in team history to have back-to-back 100-plus-yard games in the first two games of the season, joining Gene Washington (152 and 172 in 1969) and Cris Carter (121 and 107 in 1997). After Week 2, Diggs was the leader in receiving yards in the NFL. In the Vikings's overtime loss against the Lions in Week 9, Diggs set a personal-best with 13 catches for 80 yards, which passed Randy Moss and Percy Harvin (10 apiece) for receptions against the Lions. His 13 receptions also set a team record for most receptions in a November game and ranks third all-time behind Rickey Young (15) and Cris Carter (14). Diggs was part of a receiving duo, along with Adam Thielen, that became the first pair of Vikings wide receivers with 900 yards each since Randy Moss and Cris Carter accomplished that back in 2000. Diggs finished the season with 84 receptions on 111 targets for 903 yards and three touchdowns. His 75% catch rate ranked fifth among NFL wide receivers in 2016.

==== 2017 season ====
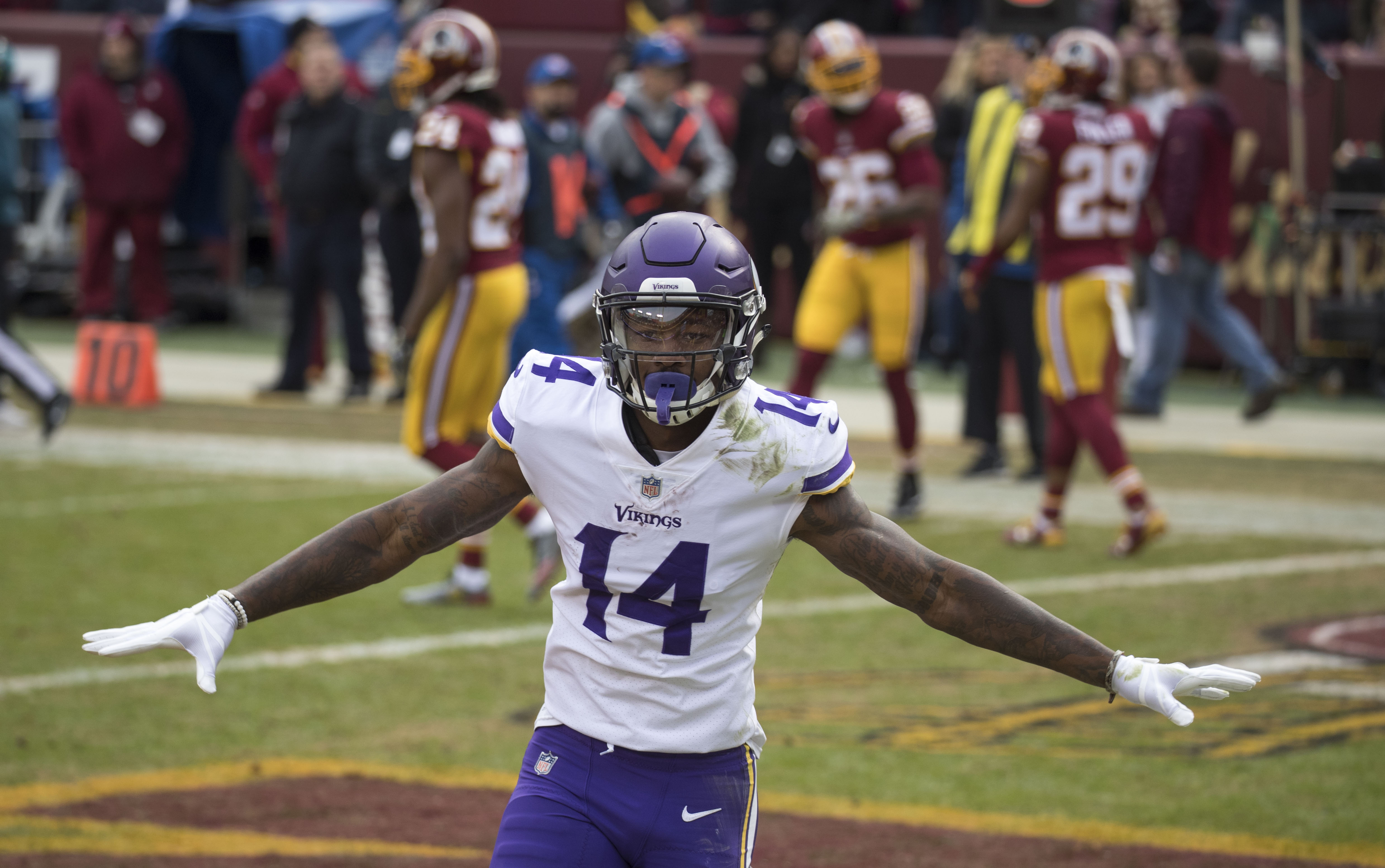
Diggs following a touchdown catch against the Washington Redskins, 2017

On September 11, 2017, in the season opener against the New Orleans Saints on Monday Night Football, Diggs caught seven receptions for 93 yards and two touchdowns. During Week 3 against the Tampa Bay Buccaneers, Diggs posted an impressive performance with 173 receiving yards and two touchdowns as the Vikings won by a score of 34–17. With 98 more yards in a Week 4 loss to the Lions, he led the NFL in receiving yards. In the Week 5 victory against the Bears, Diggs recorded a single catch for four yards, leaving the field early with a groin injury. The groin injury sidelined Diggs for both the Week 6 victory against the Packers and the Week 7 matchup against the Baltimore Ravens. Even after missing two straight games, Diggs remained 13th on the list for receiving yards. In 14 starts, Diggs finished with 849 receiving yards and eight touchdowns.

The Vikings finished the 2017 season with a 13–3 record, clinching the NFC North division and a bye in the first round of the playoffs. In the NFC divisional round against the Saints, Diggs finished with 137 receiving yards and a touchdown. With only 10 seconds remaining in the fourth quarter, Diggs made the winning play with a 61-yard touchdown, giving the Vikings a dramatic 29–24 win, dubbed the "Minneapolis Miracle". In the NFC Championship against the Philadelphia Eagles, he had eight receptions for 70 yards in the 38–7 loss. He was ranked 65th on the NFL Top 100 Players of 2018.

==== 2018 season ====
On July 31, 2018, Diggs signed a five-year, $72 million contract extension with the Vikings through the 2023 season. During Week 1, Diggs caught Kirk Cousins's first touchdown pass as a Viking in a 24–16 win over the San Francisco 49ers. In Week 2, a 29–29 tie against the Packers, Diggs recorded nine receptions for 128 yards and two touchdowns, one of which was a career-long 75-yard touchdown. In Week 4, he had 11 receptions for 123 receiving yards in a 38–31 loss to the Los Angeles Rams. In Week 11, Diggs had 13 catches for 126 yards and a touchdown in a 25–20 loss to the Bears. He finished the 2018 season with 102 receptions for 1,021 yards and nine touchdowns. Diggs and Adam Thielen gave the Vikings their first pair of 1,000+ yard receivers since Moss and Carter in 2000. He was ranked 73rd by his fellow players on the NFL Top 100 Players of 2019.

==== 2019 season ====
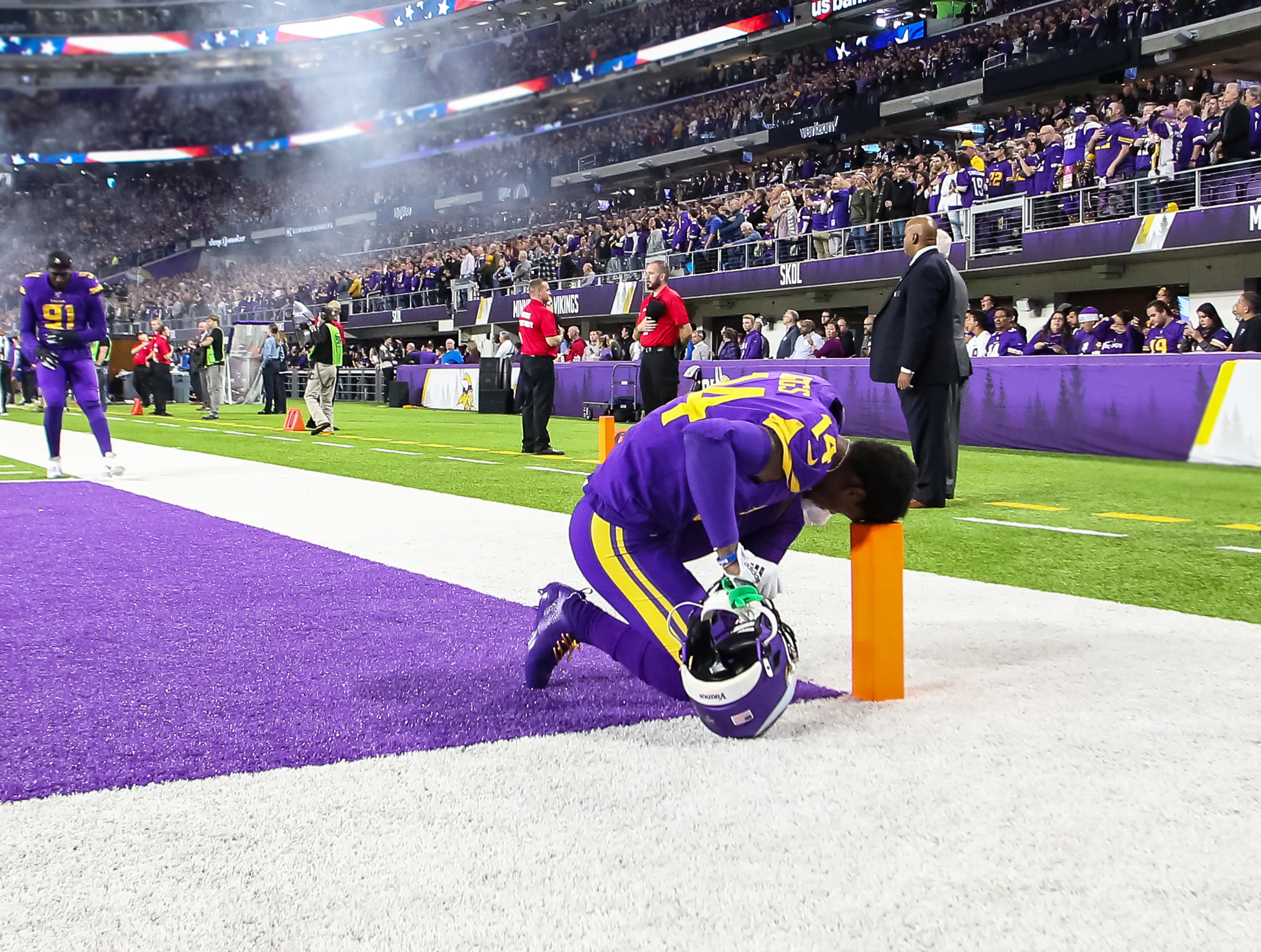
Diggs before a game in 2019

In Week 2 against the Packers, Diggs caught one pass for a 49-yard touchdown as the Vikings lost 21–16. In Week 4 against the Bears, Diggs caught seven passes for 108 yards in the 16–6 loss. During the Week 6 38–20 win over the Eagles, Diggs caught seven passes for an NFL-best 167 yards and career-best three touchdowns, becoming the first Viking to accomplish the feat since Marcus Robinson in 2005. During Week 7 against the Lions, Diggs caught seven passes for 143 receiving yards as the Vikings won 42–30. Against the Redskins in Week 8, Diggs caught seven passes for 143 receiving yards for the second straight week and a lost fumble as the Vikings won 19–9. During Week 11 against the Broncos, Diggs finished with five receptions for 121 yards, including a 54-yard touchdown. Trailing 0–20 towards halftime, the Vikings came back and narrowly won 27–23. Diggs finished the 2019 season with 63 receptions for 1,130 receiving yards and six receiving touchdowns. He was ranked 54th by his fellow players on the NFL Top 100 Players of 2020.

In the Divisional Round of the playoffs against the 49ers, Diggs caught two passes for 57 yards, including a 41-yard touchdown reception, during the 27–10 loss.

=== Buffalo Bills ===
==== 2020 season ====
On March 20, 2020, the Vikings traded Diggs and their seventh-round draft pick to the Buffalo Bills for their first, fifth, and sixth-round picks in the 2020 NFL draft, in addition to a fourth-round pick in the 2021 NFL draft. He quickly developed a rapport with Bills quarterback Josh Allen. In his debut with the team on September 13 against the New York Jets, Diggs caught eight passes for 86 yards as the Bills won 27–17. In Week 2 against the Miami Dolphins, Diggs finished with eight catches for 153 yards and his first touchdown as a Bill during the 31–28 win. In Week 4 against the Las Vegas Raiders, he had six receptions for 115 yards in the 30–23 victory. In Week 9 against the Seattle Seahawks, Diggs recorded nine catches for 118 yards during the 44–34 win. In Week 10 against the Arizona Cardinals, Diggs recorded ten catches for 93 yards and a 21-yard touchdown catch with 34 seconds left in the game to give Buffalo a late lead; however, the Bills lost the game 32–30 due to the Hail Murray.

During Buffalo's Week 13 primetime matchup with the 49ers, Diggs caught ten passes on ten targets for 92 yards, surpassing the 1,000-yard receiving mark for the third consecutive season during Buffalo's 34–24 victory. The following week, on Sunday Night Football against the Pittsburgh Steelers, Diggs caught ten passes (his fourth such game on the year), for 130 yards and a touchdown during the Bills's 26–15 win. He tied Eric Moulds for the franchise record in receptions during a single season with exactly 100. He also became the quickest player in NFL history to reach 100 catches in a single season with a new franchise. In Week 15 against the Broncos, Diggs recorded 11 catches for 147 yards during the 48–19 win. In Week 16, Diggs had nine catches for 145 yards and three touchdowns in a 38–9 win over the New England Patriots on Monday Night Football, breaking Eric Moulds's franchise record for receiving yards in a single season. His efforts earned him the AFC Offensive Player of the Week award. For the 2020 season, Diggs tallied 127 receptions and 1,535 yards, both marks leading the NFL, and eight touchdowns. Diggs earned his first Pro Bowl honor of his career and was voted First Team on the Associated Press's All-Pro Team.

In the Wild Card Round of the playoffs against the Indianapolis Colts, Diggs recorded six catches for 128 yards and a touchdown during the 27–24 win. In the Divisional Round of the playoffs against the Ravens, Diggs recorded eight catches for 106 yards and a touchdown during the 17–3 win. In the AFC Championship against the Chiefs, Diggs, playing with a torn oblique, recorded six catches for 77 yards during the 38–24 loss. Following the loss, Diggs notably stayed behind to watch the Chiefs celebrate their conference championship win, which was captured in a notable photograph. He later explained that he stayed behind to "embrace the moment, take it in as it [was]" and motivate himself to perform better the following year.

For his play that year, Diggs was ranked 11th by his fellow players on the NFL Top 100 Players of 2021.

==== 2021 season ====
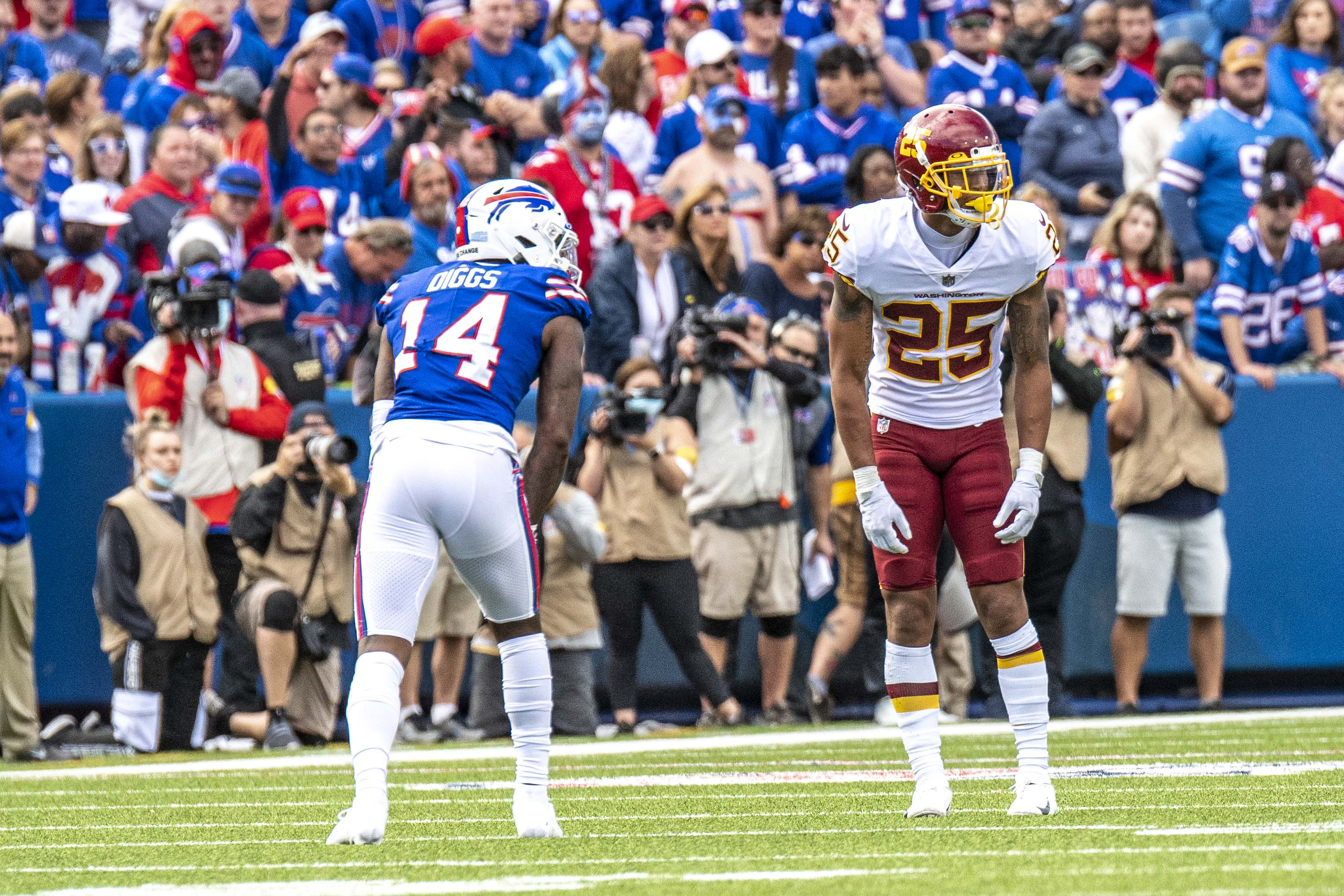
Diggs lining up against Benjamin St-Juste of the Washington Football Team in 2021

During the offseason, the Bills signed veteran receiver Emmanuel Sanders to complement Diggs in the passing game. Diggs recorded his first game of the season with over 100 receiving yards in week 4 against the Houston Texans. He surpassed this total with 162 yards and a touchdown on eight catches during a Week 10 win over the Jets. Diggs was named to the Pro Bowl for the second consecutive year, finishing the season with 1,225 receiving yards and a career-high 10 touchdowns. He was ranked 26th by his fellow players on the NFL Top 100 Players of 2022.

==== 2022 season ====
On April 6, 2022, Diggs signed a four-year, $96 million contract extension with the Bills through the 2027 season. In Week 1 against the Rams, Diggs caught eight passes for 122 yards, and had a 53-yard touchdown in the fourth quarter in the 31–10 win. In Week 2, against the Titans, Diggs had 12 receptions for 148 yards and three touchdowns in the 41–7 victory. In Week 5, against the Steelers, he had eight receptions for 102 yards and a touchdown in the 38–3 victory. In Week 6, against the Chiefs, he had ten receptions for 148 yards and one touchdown in the 24–20 victory.

In his first meeting against his former team, Diggs caught 12 passes for 128 yards in the Bills 33–30 overtime loss to the Vikings in Week 10. He then recorded touchdown receptions in back-to-back games, including a go-ahead touchdown against the Lions with less than three minutes remaining in the game. He caught a 36-yard pass from Josh Allen two-and-a-half minutes later on Buffalo's ensuing drive to help set up a Tyler Bass game-winning field goal. Diggs finished the 2022 season with 1,429 receiving yards and a career-high 11 touchdowns on 108 receptions. However, much of that production had occurred in the first nine games of the season, with 985 yards and seven touchdowns on 72 receptions accrued in that period. He was named as a Pro Bowler for the third consecutive season. During the Bills's Divisional Round playoff loss to the Cincinnati Bengals, Diggs was seen on the telecast visibly upset while talking with Allen on the sidelines during the fourth quarter and quickly left the locker room after the game. He later attributed his outburst to the events of that season. He was ranked 16th by his fellow players on the NFL Top 100 Players of 2023.

==== 2023 season ====
Diggs started off the 2023 season with at least 100 receiving yards in five of his first six games. Against the Dolphins in Week 4, Diggs recorded six receptions for 120 yards and three touchdowns in the 48–20 victory. He earned a fourth consecutive Pro Bowl nomination. In the 2023 season, Diggs finished with 107 receptions for 1,183 yards and eight touchdowns, though his production trailed off towards the end of the year, coinciding with the Bills's re-emphasis on their rushing attack. During the AFC Divisional Round playoffs against the Chiefs, Diggs dropped two passes, including a 64-yard pass from Josh Allen, as the Bills narrowly lost 27–24. He was ranked 56th by his fellow players on the NFL Top 100 Players of 2024.

=== Houston Texans ===
On April 3, 2024, Diggs, along with a sixth-round selection in the 2024 NFL draft and a fifth-round selection in the 2025 NFL draft, was traded to the Houston Texans in exchange for a second-round selection originally acquired from the Minnesota Vikings in the 2025 NFL draft. NFL insider Ian Rapoport reported that the Texans restructured Diggs's four-year contract extension from the Bills in 2022 with two years remaining into a one-year, $22.52 million deal.

In his Texans debut, Diggs had 33 receiving yards with two receiving touchdowns in a 29–27 win over the Indianapolis Colts. In the game, he went over 10,000 career receiving yards. In Week 4 against the Jacksonville Jaguars, Diggs scored his first career rushing touchdown. On October 27, in Week 8 against the Colts, Diggs suffered a non-contact injury to his knee and did not return. It was later revealed to be a torn ACL, ruling him out for the remainder of the season. He finished the 2024 season with 47 receptions for 496 yards and three touchdowns.

=== New England Patriots ===
On March 28, 2025, Diggs signed a three-year, $63.5 million contract with the New England Patriots. In May 2025, a video of Diggs with women on a yacht, holding a pink substance, surfaced online and sparked media attention. Patriots head coach Mike Vrabel announced that the team would start an investigation. In June 2025, Diggs responded to the incident saying that he had a good conversation with coach Vrabel and that he would like to keep his personal life private.

Diggs made his Patriots debut on September 7 against the Las Vegas Raiders. He had 57 yards on 6 receptions as the Patriots lost to the Raiders, 13–20. Diggs' first road game against the Bills since departing the team came in a Week 5 Sunday Night Football divisional matchup. Playing on the road, the Patriots upset the Bills 23–20 as Diggs caught 10 receptions for 146 yards. Diggs also became the first Patriot receiver to record consecutive 100 receiving yards games in the same season since Julian Edelman in 2019. In Week 8 against the Cleveland Browns, Diggs caught his first touchdown as a Patriot in the 32–13 win and finished the game with 3 receptions for 14 yards. In Week 16 against the Baltimore Ravens, Diggs recorded nine receptions for 138 yards, including a crucial fourth down conversion in the game-winning drive in the 28–24 win to help the Patriots secure their first playoff berth since 2021. He finished the 2025 season as the Patriots' leading receiver with 85 receptions for 1,013 yards and four touchdowns, becoming the first Patriots receiver to record at least 1,000 receiving yards in a single season since Julian Edelman in 2019.

In the Divisional Round against his former team the Houston Texans, Diggs recorded four receptions for 40 yards and one touchdown in the 28–16 win, advancing to his second AFC Championship game and third conference championship game overall. In the AFC Championship against the Denver Broncos, Diggs recorded five receptions for 17 yards in the 10–7 win, advancing to Super Bowl LX and his first Super Bowl appearance in his career. However, the Patriots left Super Bowl LX with a 13–29 loss to the Seattle Seahawks. Diggs had three receptions for 37 yards in the game.

On March 4, 2026, the Patriots informed Diggs that he would be released at the start of the new league year. On March 11, he was officially released.

=== Washington Commanders ===
On August 7, 2026, Diggs signed a one-year contract worth up to $12 million with the Washington Commanders.

== Career statistics ==
Legend
	Led the league
**Bold**	Career high

=== NFL ===
==== Regular season ====
Year	Team	Games		Receiving						Rushing					Fumbles	
Year	Team	GP	GS	Tgt	Rec	Yds	Y/R	Lng	TD	Att	Yds	Y/A	Lng	TD	Fum	Lost
2015	MIN	13	9	84	52	720	13.8	40	4	3	13	4.3	10	0	2	0
2016	MIN	13	11	112	84	903	10.8	46	3	3	10	3.3	12	0	0	0
2017	MIN	14	14	95	64	849	13.3	59	8	8	13	1.6	9	0	0	0
2018	MIN	15	14	149	102	1,021	10.0	**75**	9	**10**	**62**	6.2	20	0	0	0
2019	MIN	15	15	94	63	1,130	**17.9**	66	6	5	61	**12.2**	**27**	0	**4**	**3**
2020	BUF	16	15	**166**	**127**	**1,535**	12.1	55	8	1	1	1.0	1	0	0	0
2021	BUF	17	17	164	103	1,225	11.9	61	10	0	0	0.0	0	0	1	0
2022	BUF	16	16	154	108	1,429	13.2	53	**11**	1	−3	−3.0	−3	0	1	0
2023	BUF	17	17	160	107	1,183	11.1	55	8	1	5	5.0	5	0	2	1
2024	HOU	8	8	64	47	496	10.6	49	3	3	8	2.7	6	**1**	0	0
2025	NE	17	17	102	85	1,013	11.9	34	4	0	0	0.0	0	0	0	0
2026	WAS	8	2	59	36	386	10.7	42	6	0	0	0.0	0	0	0	0
Career		169	155	1,403	978	11,890	12.2	75	80	35	170	4.9	27	1	10	4

==== Postseason ====
Year	Team	Games		Receiving						Rushing					Fumbles	
Year	Team	GP	GS	Tgt	Rec	Yds	Y/R	Lng	TD	Att	Yds	Y/A	Lng	TD	Fum	Lost
2015	MIN	1	1	6	4	26	6.5	9	0	1	6	6.0	6	0	0	0
2017	MIN	2	2	22	14	207	14.8	**61**	1	0	0	0.0	0	0	0	0
2019	MIN	2	2	8	4	76	**19.0**	41	1	**2**	**8**	4.0	6	0	0	0
2020	BUF	3	2	**31**	**20**	**311**	15.6	36	**2**	0	0	0.0	0	0	0	0
2021	BUF	2	2	10	6	67	11.2	45	0	0	0	0.0	0	0	0	0
2022	BUF	2	2	19	11	149	13.5	53	0	0	0	0.0	0	0	0	0
2023	BUF	2	2	17	10	73	7.3	15	0	1	7	**7.0**	**7**	0	**1**	0
2024	HOU	0	0	Did not play due to injury												
2025	NE	4	3	20	14	110	7.9	26	1	0	0	0.0	0	0	0	0
Career		18	16	133	83	1,019	12.3	61	5	4	21	5.3	7	0	1	0

=== College ===
Season	Team	Receiving				Rushing				Kick return				Punt return			
Season	Team	Rec	Yds	Avg	TD	Att	Yds	Avg	TD	Ret	Yds	Avg	TD	Ret	Yds	Avg	TD
2012	Maryland	54	**848**	15.7	**6**	**20**	**114**	5.7	0	**25**	**713**	**28.5**	**2**	**22**	**221**	**10.0**	0
2013	Maryland	34	587	**17.3**	3	7	45	**6.4**	0	12	281	23.4	0	2	−1	−0.5	0
2014	Maryland	62	792	12.8	5	5	28	5.6	0	20	478	23.9	0	0	0	0	0
Total		150	2,227	14.8	14	32	187	5.8	0	57	1,472	25.8	2	24	220	9.2	0

== Personal life ==
Diggs's younger brother Trevon is a cornerback in the NFL. Diggs's father died in January 2008, leaving Diggs, who was 14 at the time, to take more responsibility as a father figure for his younger brothers, which is why he ultimately chose to stay close to home when deciding on a college. Darez, Stefon's other younger brother, played college football for the UAB Blazers.

Diggs has six children; his first daughter, whose mother's identity has not been publicly confirmed, was born in 2016. In October 2024, Diggs was rumored to be in a relationship with rapper Cardi B. His second daughter was born in April 2025 with model Aileen Lopera. On June 1, 2025, Diggs and Cardi B publicly confirmed their relationship in an Instagram post. On September 17, Cardi B announced that she was pregnant with her fourth child, her first with Diggs. In November 2025, Cardi B gave birth to their son. Diggs and Cardi B later split in February 2026.

Diggs appeared as himself in the American Dad! episode "Nasty Christmas" in December 2024, a show of which he has been a longtime fan.

=== Legal issues ===
In October 2025, it was revealed that Diggs' ex-girlfriend Mulan Hernandez had filed a civil lawsuit against him on April 7, 2025 in a Texas court which alleged that he tried to prevent her from reporting that he had physically abused her on at least one occasion on June 7, 2024, with the lawsuit still remaining active at this point in time. Hernandez's lawsuit was filed two months after Diggs filed a separate lawsuit which accused her of extortion.

==== Assault criminal case ====
On December 30, 2025, media reports revealed that Diggs was accused of strangulation and assault and battery stemming from a pay dispute with his personal chef on December 2, 2025. Diggs's chef claims that he struck her in the face and then tried to strangle her by placing her in a headlock with the "crook of his elbow around her neck." Initially declining to press charges, she later changed her mind and filed charges on December 22, and Diggs was arrested. After the alleged assault, the victim claims she terminated her employment with Diggs and left his residence, where she had been staying. On December 9, 2025, she returned to Diggs's residence to retrieve property. When she asked about her overdue wages, Diggs referred her to his personal assistant, who told her she had to sign a non-disclosure agreement to get paid. She refused to sign the document. The victim filed a police report, making the allegations against Diggs on December 16, 2025. Diggs's lawyer later released a statement saying that Diggs "categorically denies these allegations". Diggs was scheduled for a January 23, 2026 arraignment, two days ahead of the AFC Championship Game, but it was later postponed to February 13, 2026, five days after Super Bowl LX. On February 13, 2026, Diggs was arraigned at Dedham District Court in Dedham, Massachusetts, entering a plea of not guilty to felony strangulation or suffocation and misdemeanor assault and battery charges. Diggs was then scheduled to return to court on April 1, 2026 for a pre-trial hearing.

On May 4, 2026, Diggs' trial for the assault charge began at the Norfolk County District Court in Dedham, Massachusetts with the start of jury selection. Diggs appeared in person at Norfolk County District Court shortly before jury selection got underway. The next day, a jury found Diggs not guilty of felony strangulation as well as the assault and battery charges.

== See also ==
- List of NFL annual receiving yards leaders
- List of NFL annual receptions leaders
- List of NFL career receiving yards leaders
