= Nate Meadors =

American football player (born 1997)

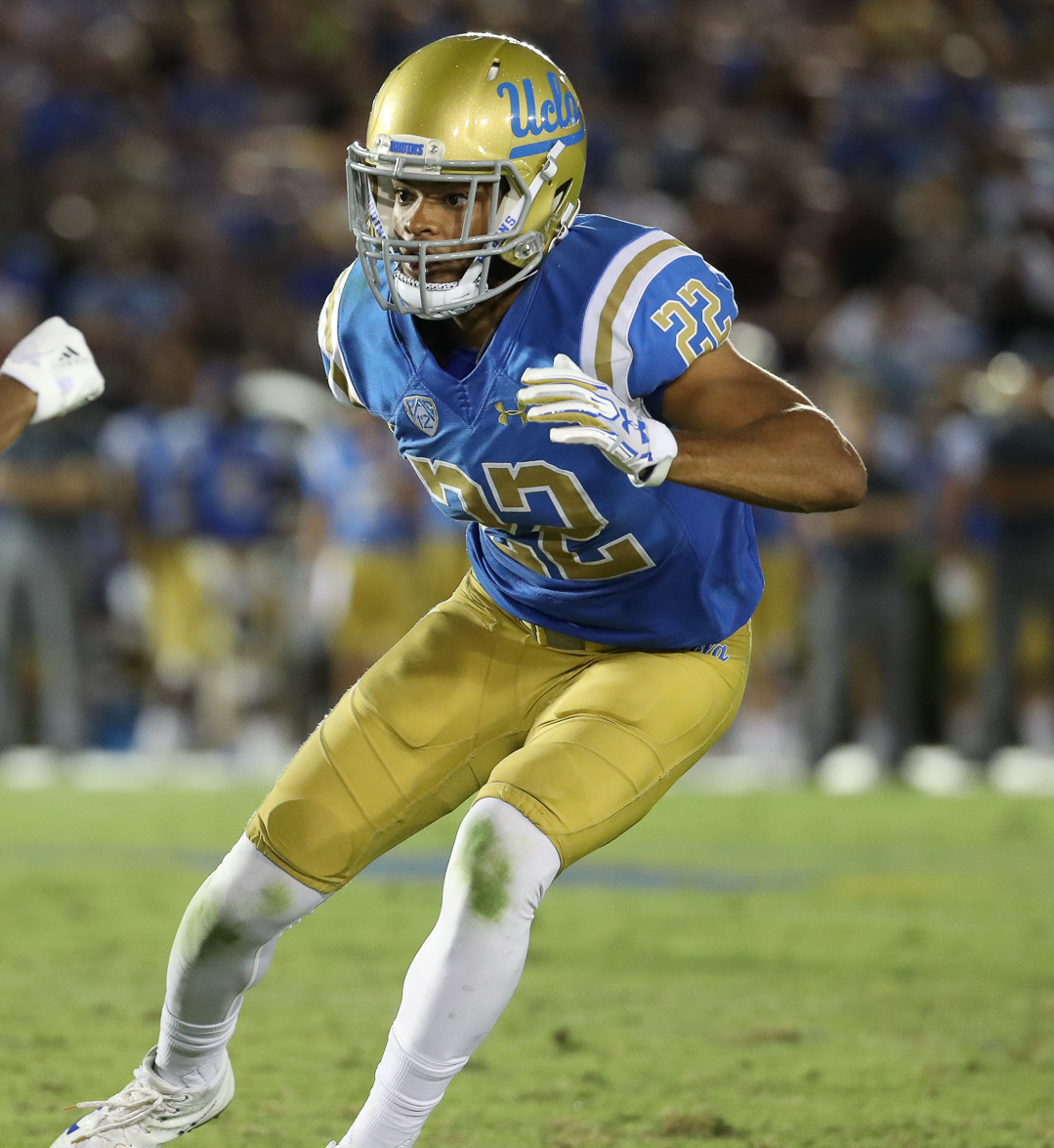
- Meadors with UCLA in 2017

No. 22 – Orlando Storm
- Position: Safety
- Roster status: Active

Personal information
- Born: February 13, 1997 (age 29); San Bernardino, California, U.S.
- Listed height: 5 ft 11 in (1.80 m)
- Listed weight: 195 lb (88 kg)

Career information
- High school: San Gorgonio (San Bernardino, California)
- College: UCLA
- NFL draft: 2019: undrafted

Career history
- Minnesota Vikings (2019–2020); Jacksonville Jaguars (2020); Philadelphia Eagles (2021)*; Cleveland Browns (2021)*; New York Giants (2022)*; Tennessee Titans (2022)*; St. Louis Battlehawks (2023); Cleveland Browns (2023)*; Pittsburgh Steelers (2023)*; St. Louis Battlehawks (2025); Orlando Storm (2026–present)
- * Offseason or practice squad member only

Career NFL statistics as of 2023
- Total tackles: 2
- Stats at Pro Football Reference

Nathan Malik Meadors (born February 13, 1997) is an American professional football safety for the Orlando Storm of the United Football League (UFL). He played college football at UCLA.

== Early life ==
Meadors was born and grew up in San Bernardino, California, and attended San Gorgonio High School. He was San Gorgonio's starting quarterback as a senior and was named All-CIF Inland Division after passing for 1,481 yards and 22 touchdowns with four interceptions while also rushing for 1,971 yards and 26 touchdowns.

== College career ==
Meadors played four seasons for the UCLA Bruins. Meadors led the Bruins with nine passes broken up and had 55 tackles and an interception, which he returned for a touchdown, in his junior season. As a senior, he recorded 37 tackles, three passes defended, two tackles for loss, one sack and one interception in 10 games played. Meadors finished his collegiate career with 149 tackles, 22 passes broken up and three interceptions in 42 games played (30 starts).

== Professional career ==
Pre-draft measurables
Height	Weight	Arm length	Hand span	Wingspan	40-yard dash	10-yard split	20-yard split	20-yard shuttle	Three-cone drill	Vertical jump	Broad jump	Bench press
5 ft 11 1/4 in (1.81 m)	196 lb (89 kg)	30 3/4 in (0.78 m)	8 3/4 in (0.22 m)	6 ft 3 in (1.91 m)	4.52 s	1.57 s	2.64 s	4.18 s	6.97 s	37.0 in (0.94 m)	9 ft 11 in (3.02 m)	15 reps
All values from Pro Day

=== Minnesota Vikings ===
Meadors signed with the Minnesota Vikings as an undrafted free agent on April 29, 2019. He was waived by the team during final roster cuts on August 31, but was re-signed to the team's practice squad the next day. Meadors was promoted to the active roster on September 12. Meadors made his NFL debut on September 15, in a 21–16 loss against the Green Bay Packers. He was waived on September 28, and was re-signed to the practice squad.

Meadors was promoted to the active roster on January 10, 2020. Meadors was waived by the Vikings during final roster cuts on September 5, and was re–signed to the practice squad the next day. He was promoted to the active roster on September 12. Meadors was waived on September 18 and re-signed to the practice squad on September 22. He was released by the team on September 28.

=== Jacksonville Jaguars ===
On October 19, 2020, Meadors was signed to the Jacksonville Jaguars' practice squad. He was elevated to the active roster on December 5 for the team's week 13 game against the Minnesota Vikings, and reverted to the practice squad after the game.

Meadors signed a reserve/future contract with Jacksonville on January 4, 2021. He was waived by the Jaguars on May 4.

=== Philadelphia Eagles ===
On May 14, 2021, Meadors signed with the Philadelphia Eagles. He was waived/injured by the team on August 4, and placed on injured reserve. Meadors was released by the Eagles on August 13.

=== Cleveland Browns (first stint) ===
Meadors was signed to the Cleveland Browns' practice squad on November 9, 2021. The Browns signed Meadors to a reserve/futures contract on January 10, 2022. He was waived by Cleveland on August 3.

=== New York Giants ===
On August 4, 2022, Meadors was claimed off waivers by the New York Giants. He was waived by New York on August 30, and was re–signed to the practice squad the next day. On September 1, Meadors was released by the Giants.

=== Tennessee Titans ===
Meadors signed with the Tennessee Titans on their practice squad on January 2, 2023.

=== St. Louis Battlehawks ===
The St. Louis BattleHawks selected Meadors in the fourth round of the 2023 XFL Supplemental Draft on January 1, 2023, He was released from his contract on August 12.

=== Cleveland Browns (second stint) ===
On August 13, 2023, Meadors was signed by the Cleveland Browns. On August 27, Meadors was released by the Browns.

=== Pittsburgh Steelers ===
On December 11, 2023, Meadors signed a letter of intent with the St. Louis Battlehawks. He then signed with the Pittsburgh Steelers practice squad on December 27. Meadors was released by Pittsburgh on January 9, 2024. He signed a reserve/future contract with the Steelers on February 2. Meadors was waived/injured by the team on August 8. He was released again on August 19.

=== St. Louis Battlehawks (second stint) ===
On December 9, 2024, Meadors re-signed with the St. Louis Battlehawks of the United Football League (UFL).

=== Orlando Storm ===
On January 13, 2026, Meadors was selected by the Orlando Storm in the 2026 UFL Draft.
