= Austin Cutting =

American football player (born 1996)

No. 58
- Position: Long snapper

Personal information
- Born: October 27, 1996 (age 30); Palmdale, California, U.S.
- Listed height: 6 ft 3 in (1.91 m)
- Listed weight: 245 lb (111 kg)

Career information
- High school: Central (Fort Worth, Texas)
- College: Air Force
- NFL draft: 2019: 7th round, 250th overall pick

Career history
- Minnesota Vikings (2019–2020)

Career NFL statistics
- Games played: 25
- Total tackles: 1
- Stats at Pro Football Reference

Austin Cutting (born October 27, 1996) is an American former professional football player who was a long snapper in the National Football League (NFL). He played college football for the Air Force Falcons and was selected by the Minnesota Vikings in the seventh round of the 2019 NFL draft.

== Professional career ==
Cutting was selected by the Minnesota Vikings in the seventh round (250th overall) of the 2019 NFL draft. There had been precedent, such as Joe Cardona of the 2015 NFL draft, for military school graduates to be allowed to defer their 24-month service policy, but the United States Secretary of Defense rescinded the policy in 2017 to allow military service academy student-athlete graduates to delay their assignments to explore professional sports opportunities. In June 2019, US President Donald Trump requested that a policy be established to facilitate athletic pursuits and Cutting was the first to sign a professional contract following the new policy.

Cutting was placed on the reserve/COVID-19 list by the team on November 10, 2020, and activated four days later. He was waived on December 1, 2020.
