= 2014 Minnesota Vikings season =

54th season in franchise history

- Owner: Zygi Wilf
- General manager: Rick Spielman
- Head coach: Mike Zimmer
- Home stadium: TCF Bank Stadium

Results
- Record: 7–9
- Division place: 3rd NFC North
- Playoffs: Did not qualify
- Pro Bowlers: None

Uniform
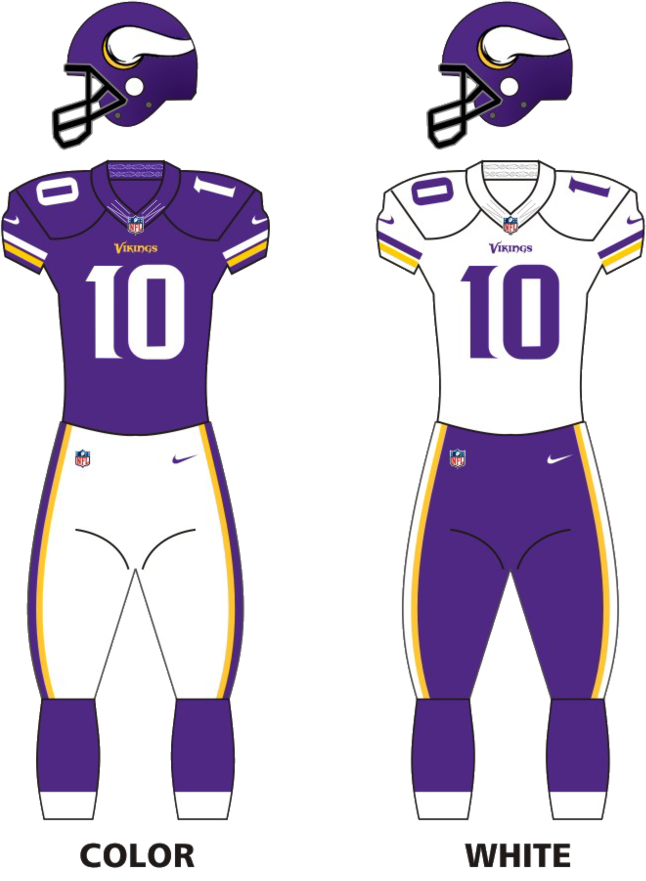

The 2014 season was the Minnesota Vikings' 54th in the National Football League (NFL) and their first under head coach Mike Zimmer. It was the first of two seasons in which the Vikings played at the outdoor TCF Bank Stadium on the campus of the University of Minnesota. Construction of U.S. Bank Stadium began on the site of the team's former home, the Hubert H. Humphrey Metrodome, with a target of opening for the 2016 season. The opening day roster did not feature Kevin Williams for the first time since 2002, and Jared Allen for the first time since 2007; they both left in free agency.

Though the Vikings were eliminated from postseason contention after a loss to the Detroit Lions in Week 15, they improved on 2013's 5–10–1 record, which saw them go through a quarterback carousel and one of the worst defenses in the league that year, and arguably in Vikings' history.

== Offseason ==
=== 2014 draft ===
| Pro Bowler |

2014 Minnesota Vikings Draft
| Draft order | | Player name | Position | College | Contract | Notes |
| Round | Overall | Player name | Position | College | Contract | Notes |
|---|---|---|---|---|---|---|
| 1 | 8 | Traded to the Cleveland Browns (Note: The Vikings traded their original first-round selection (8th overall) to the Cleveland Browns in exchange for the Browns' fifth-round selection (145th overall) and the first-round selection they had received from the Buffalo Bills.) | | | | |
| 1 | 9 | Anthony Barr | Linebacker | UCLA | 4 years, $12.74 million | from Bills via Browns |
| 1 | 32 | Teddy Bridgewater | Quarterback | Louisville | 4 years, $7.59 million | from Seahawks (Note: The Vikings traded their second- and fourth-round selections (40th and 108th overall) to the Seattle Seahawks in exchange for Seattle's first-round selection (32nd overall).) |
| 2 | 40 | Traded to the Seattle Seahawks | | | | |
| 3 | 72 | Scott Crichton | Defensive end | Oregon State | 4 years, $3 million | |
| 3 | 96 | Jerick McKinnon | Running back | Georgia Southern | 4 years, $2.75 million | from Seahawks (Note: The Vikings traded WR Percy Harvin to the Seattle Seahawks in exchange for Seattle's third-round selection.) |
| 4 | 108 | Traded to the Seattle Seahawks | | | | |
| 5 | 145 | David Yankey | Guard | Stanford | 4 years, $2.43 million | from Browns |
| 5 | 148 | Traded to the Carolina Panthers (Note: The Vikings traded their original fifth-round selection (148th overall) to the Carolina Panthers in exchange for the Panthers' fifth-round selection (168th overall) and the seventh-round selection they acquired from the New York Giants (225th overall).) | | | | |
| 5 | 168 | Traded to the Atlanta Falcons (Note: The Vikings traded the fifth-round selection they received from the Panthers to the Atlanta Falcons in exchange for Atlanta's sixth- and seventh-round selections (182nd and 220th overall).) | | | | from Panthers |
| 6 | 182 | Antone Exum | Cornerback | Virginia Tech | 4 years, $2.34 million | from Falcons |
| 6 | 184 | Kendall James | Cornerback | Maine | 4 years, $2.33 million | |
| 7 | 220 | Shamar Stephen | Defensive tackle | UConn | 4 years, $2.29 million | from Falcons |
| 7 | 223 | Brandon Watts | Linebacker | Georgia Tech | 4 years, $2.28 million | |
| 7 | 225 | Jabari Price | Cornerback | North Carolina | 4 years, $2.28 million | from Giants via Panthers |

Draft trades

=== Roster changes ===
Re-signings
| Date | Player name | Position | Contract terms |
|---|---|---|---|
| December 30, 2013 | Adam Thielen | WR | 2 years / $930,000^{[RFC]} |
| March 7, 2014 | Marcus Sherels | CB | 2 years / $2.2 million |
| March 11, 2014 | Matt Cassel | QB | 2 years / $10 million |
| March 11, 2014 | Everson Griffen | DE | 5 years / $42.5 million |
| March 12, 2014 | Joe Berger | G | 1 year / $985,000 |
| March 14, 2014 | Jerome Simpson | WR | 1 year / $1 million |
| March 15, 2014 | Charlie Johnson | G | 2 years / $5 million |
| April 7, 2014 | Matt Asiata | RB | 1 year / $570,000 |
| August 31, 2014 | Joe Banyard | RB | ^{[PS]} |
| August 31, 2014 | Kain Colter | WR | ^{[PS]} |
| August 31, 2014 | Isame Faciane | DT | ^{[PS]} |
| August 31, 2014 | Chase Ford | TE | ^{[PS]} |
| August 31, 2014 | Zac Kerin | C | ^{[PS]} |
| August 31, 2014 | Justin Trattou | DE | ^{[PS]} |
| September 2, 2014 | Austin Wentworth | OT | ^{[PS]} |
| September 16, 2014 | Zach Line | FB | ^{[PS]} |
| October 7, 2014 | Donte Foster | WR | ^{[PS]} |
| October 7, 2014 | Chandler Harnish | QB | ^{[PS]} |
| November 12, 2014 | Ryan Otten | TE | ^{[PS]} |
| November 18, 2014 | Dominique Williams | RB | ^{[PS]} |

^{^[RFC]} Denotes this is a reserve/future contract.
^{^[PS]}Denotes a signing to the Practice Squad.

Departures
| Date | Player name | Position | Note | New team |
|---|---|---|---|---|
| February 7, 2014 | Erin Henderson | MLB | Released | |
| March 5, 2014 | John Carlson | TE | Released | Arizona Cardinals |
| March 6, 2014 | Greg Childs | WR | Released | Toronto Argonauts (CFL) |
| March 6, 2014 | Letroy Guion | DE | Released | Green Bay Packers |
| March 11, 2014 | Desmond Bishop | LB | UFA | Arizona Cardinals |
| March 11, 2014 | Marvin Mitchell | LB | UFA | |
| March 12, 2014 | Toby Gerhart | RB | UFA | Jacksonville Jaguars |
| March 14, 2014 | Chris Cook | CB | UFA | San Francisco 49ers |
| March 21, 2014 | Joe Webb | QB/WR | UFA | Carolina Panthers |
| March 26, 2014 | Jared Allen | DE | UFA | Chicago Bears |
| April 16, 2014 | Josh Freeman | QB | UFA | New York Giants |
| June 16, 2014 | Kevin Williams | DT | UFA | Seattle Seahawks |
| August 25, 2014 | Robert Steeples | CB | Released | Kansas City Chiefs |
| August 30, 2014 | Jeff Baca | G | Released | Cincinnati Bengals |
| August 30, 2014 | Chase Baker | DT | Released | |
| September 8, 2014 | Jamarca Sanford | FS | Injury settlement | Washington Redskins |
| September 18, 2014 | Jerome Simpson | WR | Released | San Francisco 49ers (2015) |
| October 2, 2014 | Rodney Smith | WR | Released | Cleveland Browns |

Additions
| Date | Player name | Position | Previous team | Contract terms |
|---|---|---|---|---|
| January 3, 2014 | Josh Samuda | G | Miami Dolphins (2012) | 1 year / $495,000 ^{[RFC]} |
| March 12, 2014 | Jasper Brinkley | MLB | Arizona Cardinals | 1 year / $830,000 |
| March 12, 2014 | Linval Joseph | DT | New York Giants | 5 years / $31.5 million |
| March 13, 2014 | Captain Munnerlyn | CB | Carolina Panthers | 3 years / $14.25 million |
| March 20, 2014 | Tom Johnson | DT | New Orleans Saints | 1 year / $845,000 |
| March 21, 2014 | Corey Wootton | DE | Chicago Bears | 1 year / $1.5 million |
| March 27, 2014 | Vladimir Ducasse | G | New York Jets | 1 year / $795,000 |
| April 8, 2014 | Lestar Jean | WR | Houston Texans | 1 year / $635,000 |
| May 13, 2014 | Antonio Richardson | OT | Tennessee | Undrafted FA |
| May 19, 2014 | Dom DeCicco | LB | Chicago Bears | |
| August 31, 2014 | Mike Harris | OT | San Diego Chargers | |
| September 9, 2014 | Josh Kaddu | LB | Philadelphia Eagles | ^{[PS]} |
| September 20, 2014 | Charles Johnson | WR | Cleveland Browns | |
| November 3, 2014 | Pat Devlin | QB | Miami Dolphins | ^{[PS]} |
| December 6, 2014 | Ahmad Dixon | S | Miami Dolphins | |
| December 10, 2014 | Carter Bykowski | OT | San Francisco 49ers | |
| December 17, 2014 | Jordan McCray | G | Green Bay Packers | ^{[PS]} |
| December 24, 2014 | Justin Anderson | LB | New York Giants | ^{[PS]} |
| December 24, 2014 | Henry Josey | RB | Jacksonville Jaguars | |

Signed and released players
| Date signed | Player name | Position | Previous team | Contract terms | Date released |
|---|---|---|---|---|---|
| December 30, 2013 | Brandon Bishop | S | Minnesota Vikings (re-signed) | 2 years / $930,000^{[RFC]} | August 25, 2014 |
| December 30, 2013 | Kip Edwards | CB | Minnesota Vikings (re-signed) | 2 years / $930,000^{[RFC]} | June 2, 2014 |
| December 30, 2013 | Kevin Murphy | OT | Minnesota Vikings (re-signed) | 2 years / $930,000^{[RFC]} | August 25, 2014 |
| December 30, 2013 | Spencer Nealy | DE | Minnesota Vikings (re-signed) | 2 years / $930,000^{[RFC]} | July 23, 2014 |
| December 30, 2013 | Bradley Randle | RB | Minnesota Vikings (re-signed) | 2 years / $930,000^{[RFC]} | May 13, 2014 |
| January 3, 2014 | Kamar Jorden | WR | Calgary Stampeders (CFL) | 2 years / $930,000^{[RFC]} | August 25, 2014 |
| January 22, 2014 | Kheeston Randall | DT | Cincinnati Bengals | 2 years / $1.08 million | August 25, 2014 |
| February 11, 2014 | Simoni Lawrence | LB | Hamilton Tiger-Cats (CFL) | 3 years / $1.54 million | May 13, 2014 |
| March 10, 2014 | Larry Dean | LB | Minnesota Vikings (re-signed) | 2 years / $2 million | August 31, 2014 |
| March 13, 2014 | Fred Evans | DT | Minnesota Vikings (re-signed) | 1 year / $1 million | August 30, 2014 |
| March 14, 2014 | Derek Cox | CB | San Diego Chargers | 1 year / $780,000 | August 25, 2014 |
| April 15, 2014 | Terrell Manning | OLB | San Diego Chargers | 1 year / $570,000 | May 13, 2014 |
| April 15, 2014 | Allen Reisner | TE | Jacksonville Jaguars | 1 year / $645,000 | August 30, 2014 |
| April 17, 2014 | Kurt Coleman | FS | Philadelphia Eagles | 1 year / $900,000 | August 30, 2014 |
| May 13, 2014 | Conor Boffeli | G | Iowa | Undrafted free agents | May 19, 2014 |
| May 13, 2014 | Pierce Burton | OT | Ole Miss | Undrafted free agents | August 25, 2014 |
| May 13, 2014 | Kain Colter | WR | Northwestern | Undrafted free agents | August 30, 2014 |
| May 13, 2014 | Rakim Cox | DE | Villanova | Undrafted free agents | August 4, 2014 |
| May 13, 2014 | Isame Faciane | DT | FIU | Undrafted free agents | August 30, 2014 |
| May 13, 2014 | Donte Foster | WR | Ohio | Undrafted free agents | August 30, 2014 |
| May 13, 2014 | Matt Hall | OT | Belhaven | Undrafted free agents | July 25, 2014 |
| May 13, 2014 | Zac Kerin | C | Toledo | Undrafted free agents | August 30, 2014 |
| May 13, 2014 | A.C. Leonard | TE | Tennessee State | Undrafted free agents | August 6, 2014 |
| May 13, 2014 | Erik Lora | WR | Eastern Illinois | Undrafted free agents | August 25, 2014 |
| May 13, 2014 | Travis Partridge | QB | Missouri Western | Undrafted free agents | May 19, 2014 |
| May 13, 2014 | Tyler Scott | DE | Northwestern | Undrafted free agents | August 25, 2014 |
| May 13, 2014 | Jake Snyder | DE | Virginia | Undrafted free agents | August 25, 2014 |
| May 13, 2014 | Dominique Williams | RB | Wagner | Undrafted free agents | August 30, 2014 |
| May 16, 2014 | Austin Wentworth | OT | Fresno State | Undrafted free agents | August 31, 2014 |
| May 19, 2014 | Mike Zimmer | LB | Jacksonville Jaguars | | August 30, 2014 |
| June 2, 2014 | Julian Posey | CB | Cleveland Browns | | August 30, 2014 |
| June 13, 2014 | Josh Cooper | WR | Cleveland Browns | | July 25, 2014 |
| July 23, 2014 | Michael Higgins | TE | New Orleans Saints | | August 26, 2014 |
| July 25, 2014 | Andy Cruse | WR | Houston Texans | | August 25, 2014 |
| July 25, 2014 | Ty Walker | WR | Seattle Seahawks | | August 25, 2014 |
| August 4, 2014 | Chris Crocker | SS | Cincinnati Bengals | | August 30, 2014 |
| August 10, 2014 | Kory Sperry | TE | Arizona Cardinals | | August 25, 2014 |
| August 18, 2014 | Justin Jackson | LB | Detroit Lions | | August 30, 2014 |
| August 31, 2014 | Donte Foster | WR | Minnesota Vikings | ^{[PS]} | September 29, 2014 |
| August 31, 2014 | Kendall James | CB | Minnesota Vikings | ^{[PS]} | September 2, 2014 |
| August 31, 2014 | Mike Remmers | OT | Minnesota Vikings | ^{[PS]} | September 3, 2014 |
| August 31, 2014 | MarQueis Gray | TE | Cleveland Browns | ^{[PS]} | November 19, 2014 |
| September 1, 2014 | Chris Greenwood | CB | Detroit Lions | ^{[PS]} | December 17, 2014 |
| September 3, 2014 | Ahmad Dixon | SS | Dallas Cowboys | ^{[PS]} | September 8, 2014 |
| September 24, 2014 | McLeod Bethel-Thompson | QB | New England Patriots | ^{[PS]} | October 7, 2014 |
| September 24, 2014 | Ryan Otten | TE | Cincinnati Bengals | ^{[PS]} | November 3, 2014 |
| September 29, 2014 | Chandler Harnish | QB | Indianapolis Colts | ^{[PS]} | October 3, 2014 |
| October 7, 2014 | Pierre Warren | S | New Orleans Saints | ^{[PS]} | November 18, 2014 |
| November 3, 2014 | RaShaun Allen | TE | Seattle Seahawks | ^{[PS]} | November 11, 2014 |
| November 19, 2014 | Ben Tate | RB | Cleveland Browns | | December 23, 2014 |
| November 25, 2014 | J'Marcus Webb | OT | Minnesota Vikings | | December 16, 2014 |

== Staff ==
2014 Minnesota Vikings staff
| Front office: Owner/chairman – Zygi Wilf; Owner/president – Mark Wilf; Owner/vice chairman – Leonard Wilf; General manager – Rick Spielman; Vice president of football operations – Rob Brzezinski; Assistant general manager – George Paton; Director of college scouting – Jamaal Stephenson; Director of pro scouting – Ryan Monnens; Head coaches: Head coach – Mike Zimmer; Offensive coaches: Offensive coordinator – Norv Turner; Quarterbacks – Scott Turner; Running backs – Kirby Wilson; Wide receivers – George Stewart; Assistant wide receivers/offensive quality control – Klint Kubiak; Tight ends – Kevin Stefanski; Offensive line – Jeff Davidson; Assistant offensive line – Hank Fraley | Defensive coaches: Defensive coordinator – George Edwards; Defensive line – Andre Patterson; Assistant defensive line – Robb Akey; Linebackers – Adam Zimmer; Defensive backs – Jerry Gray; Defensive assistant/defensive backs – Jonathan Gannon; Defensive assistant – Jeff Howard; Special teams coaches: Special teams coordinator – Mike Priefer; Assistant special teams – Ryan Ficken; Strength and conditioning: Head athletic trainer – Eric Sugarman; Head strength and conditioning – Evan Marcus; Assistant strength and conditioning – Jeff Hurd |

== Roster ==
2014 Minnesota Vikings roster
| Quarterbacks (QB): 5 Teddy Bridgewater; 7 Christian Ponder; Running backs (RB): 44 Matt Asiata; 23 Joe Banyard; 42 Jerome Felton FB; 33 Henry Josey; 48 Zach Line FB; Wide receivers (WR): 15 Greg Jennings; 12 Charles Johnson; 84 Cordarrelle Patterson; 19 Adam Thielen; 17 Jarius Wright; Tight ends (TE): 85 Rhett Ellison; 86 Chase Ford; 82 Kyle Rudolph | Offensive linemen (OL): 61 Joe Berger C/G; 60 Carter Bykowski T; 62 Vladimir Ducasse G; 79 Michael Harris T; 74 Charlie Johnson G; 75 Matt Kalil T; 65 John Sullivan C; 72 Austin Wentworth G; 66 David Yankey G; Defensive linemen (DL): 95 Scott Crichton DE; 73 Sharrif Floyd DT; 97 Everson Griffen DE; 92 Tom Johnson DT; 98 Linval Joseph DT; 96 Brian Robison DE; 93 Shamar Stephen DT; 94 Justin Trattou DE; 99 Corey Wootton DE | Linebackers (LB): 54 Jasper Brinkley MLB; 57 Audie Cole; 52 Chad Greenway OLB; 50 Gerald Hodges OLB; 51 Josh Kaddu OLB; 58 Brandon Watts OLB; Defensive backs (DB): 36 Robert Blanton SS; 26 Ahmad Dixon FS; 32 Antone Exum SS; 24 Captain Munnerlyn CB; 27 Shaun Prater CB; 39 Jabari Price CB; 29 Xavier Rhodes CB; 21 Josh Robinson CB; 34 Andrew Sendejo S; 35 Marcus Sherels CB; 22 Harrison Smith FS; Special teams (ST): 18 Jeff Locke P; 46 Cullen Loeffler LS; 3 Blair Walsh K | Practice squad: 59 Justin Anderson LB; 13 Kain Colter WR; 6 Pat Devlin QB; 76 Isame Faciane DT; 11 Donte Foster WR; 67 Zac Kerin G; 64 Jordan McCray C; 89 Ryan Otten TE; 20 Dominique Williams RB; Reserve: 55 Anthony Barr OLB (IR); 16 Matt Cassel QB (IR); 49 Dom DeCicco OLB (IR); 63 Brandon Fusco G (IR); 71 Phil Loadholt T (IR); 56 Michael Mauti MLB (IR); 31 Jerick McKinnon RB (IR); 28 Adrian Peterson RB (Susp.); 78 Antonio Richardson T (IR); 64 Josh Samuda G (IR); Rookies in italics 53 active, 10 reserve, 9 practice squad |

== Preseason ==
=== Schedule ===
| Week | Date | Opponent | Result | Record | Venue | Attendance | NFL.com recap |
|---|---|---|---|---|---|---|---|
| 1 | August 8 | Oakland Raiders | W 10–6 | 1–0 | TCF Bank Stadium | 51,752 | Recap |
| 2 | August 16 | Arizona Cardinals | W 30–28 | 2–0 | TCF Bank Stadium | 51,763 | Recap |
| 3 | August 23 | at Kansas City Chiefs | W 30–12 | 3–0 | Arrowhead Stadium | 73,442 | Recap |
| 4 | August 28 | at Tennessee Titans | W 19–3 | 4–0 | LP Field | 69,143 | Recap |

=== Game summaries ===
==== Week 1: vs. Oakland Raiders ====
Preseason Week 1: Oakland Raiders at Minnesota Vikings – Game summary

| Quarter | 1 | 2 | 3 | 4 | Total |
|---|---|---|---|---|---|
| Raiders | 0 | 0 | 0 | 6 | 6 |
| Vikings | 10 | 0 | 0 | 0 | 10 |

at TCF Bank Stadium, Minneapolis, Minnesota

- Date: August 8
- Game time: 7:00 p.m. CDT
- Game weather: Clear, 80 °F (27 °C)
- Game attendance: 51,752
- Referee: Gene Steratore (114)
- TV: KARE-11
- Recap, Game Book

Game information

First quarter

- MIN – Matt Asiata 1-yard run (Blair Walsh kick), 8:27. Vikings 7–0. Drive: 10 plays, 70 yards, 5:28.
- MIN – Blair Walsh 30-yard field goal, 0:54. Vikings 10–0. Drive: 10 plays, 42 yards, 5:28.

Second quarter

- No scoring plays.

Third quarter

- No scoring plays.

Fourth quarter

- OAK – Matt McGloin 10-yard run (pass failed), 1:25. Vikings 10–6. Drive: 9 plays, 56 yards, 2:32.

Top passers

- OAK – Matt McGloin – 11/18, 90 yards
- MIN – Matt Cassel – 5/6, 62 yards

Top rushers

- OAK – Latavius Murray – 7 rushes, 28 yards
- MIN – Jerick McKinnon – 12 rushes, 45 yards

Top receivers

- OAK – Brice Butler – 4 rec, 44 yards
- MIN – Cordarrelle Patterson – 3 rec, 38 yards

Coming off a season in which the Vikings let almost every team score at least 20 points on them (including the preseason), the Vikings showcased a defense that held the Raiders to a single digit score and kept them scoreless until the last 90 seconds of the 4th quarter, when they eventually scored a touchdown. This was the first time the Vikings' defense held any team to a single digit score since week 16 of the 2012 season. Rookie Anthony Barr recorded half a sack, and Kurt Coleman intercepted Raiders quarterback Derek Carr once.

On the offense, Matt Cassel started and shined on his sole drive, leading the team down the field, where Matt Asiata scored the Vikings' only touchdown of the game from a yard out. After Cassel's drive, rookie quarterback Teddy Bridgewater entered the game and played a few drives, completing 6 of 13 pass attempts for 49 yards, getting sacked twice, and fumbling once (fellow Viking Matt Kalil recovered the fumble). The Vikings got a field goal on the second drive. Shortly after the half, the signal calling was turned to Christian Ponder, who managed a pair of first-down passes of 17 and 15 yards early on, but produced little thereafter.

==== Week 2: vs. Arizona Cardinals ====
Preseason Week 2: Arizona Cardinals at Minnesota Vikings – Game summary

| Quarter | 1 | 2 | 3 | 4 | Total |
|---|---|---|---|---|---|
| Cardinals | 7 | 7 | 7 | 7 | 28 |
| Vikings | 3 | 10 | 0 | 17 | 30 |

at TCF Bank Stadium, Minneapolis, Minnesota

- Date: August 16
- Game time: 7:30 p.m. CDT
- Game weather: Partly cloudy, 85 °F (29 °C)
- Game attendance: 51,763
- Referee: Craig Wrolstad (4)
- TV: KARE-11
- Recap, Game Book

Game information

First quarter

- ARI – Jonathan Dwyer 1-yard run (Jay Feely kick), 9:36. Cardinals 7–0. Drive: 9 plays, 93 yards, 3:26.
- MIN – Blair Walsh 21-yard field goal, 2:01. Cardinals 7–3. Drive: 13 plays, 65 yards, 7:35.

Second quarter

- MIN – Matt Cassel 51-yard pass to Kyle Rudolph (Blair Walsh kick), 14:25. Vikings 10–7. Drive: 2 plays, 62 yards, 0:35.
- ARI – Drew Stanton 1-yard pass to Darren Fells (Jay Feely kick), 3:05. Cardinals 14–10. Drive: 11 plays, 59 yards, 6:07.
- MIN – Blair Walsh 34-yard field goal, 0:50. Cardinals 14–13. Drive: 7 plays, 35 yards, 2:15.

Third quarter

- ARI – Robert Hughes 2-yard run (Jay Feely kick), 4:54. Cardinals 21–13. Drive: 19 plays, 80 yards, 10:06.

Fourth quarter

- MIN – Blair Walsh 21-yard field goal, 14:53. Cardinals 21–16. Drive: 9 plays, 89 yards, 5:01.
- MIN – Teddy Bridgewater 3-yard pass to Allen Reisner (Bridgewater–Wright pass), 7:57. Vikings 24–21. Drive: 10 plays, 68 yards, 4:55.
- ARI – Zach Bauman 6-yard fumble recovery (Jay Feely kick), 1:11. Cardinals 28–24. Drive: 5 plays, 49 yards, 0:38.
- MIN – Teddy Bridgewater 2-yard pass to Rodney Smith (kick failed), 0:18. Vikings 30-28. Drive: 7 plays, 83 yards, 0:53.

Top passers

- ARI – Carson Palmer – 4/8, 91 yards
- MIN – Teddy Bridgewater – 16/20, 177 yards, 2 TD

Top rushers

- ARI – Robert Hughes – 9 rushes, 26 yards, TD
- MIN – Joe Banyard – 6 rushes, 64 yards

Top receivers

- ARI – Jaron Brown – 2 rec, 86 yards
- MIN – Kyle Rudolph – 4 rec, 89 yards, TD

The Vikings faced a Cardinals team that shut the Texans out 32–0 in week 1. The Cardinals strained the Vikings' defense, but the offense, headed by Matt Cassel in the first half, was able to keep pace with their scoring to see the Vikings trailing 14–13 at halftime. The Vikings switched to Teddy Bridgewater after the half, and the rookie quarterback orchestrated a pair of drives that put the Vikings back in the lead 24–21. A few drives later, the Vikings' defense would end up being penalized three straight times, allowing the Cardinals to score a touchdown through a botched snap that was recovered by the Cardinals and run into the end zone. The Vikings were given the ball with around a minute to score. Bridgewater led the Vikings down field in comeback fashion to score the game-winner with a pass to Rodney Smith, sealing another preseason victory for the Vikings.

==== Week 3: at Kansas City Chiefs ====
Preseason Week 3: Minnesota Vikings at Kansas City Chiefs – Game summary

| Quarter | 1 | 2 | 3 | 4 | Total |
|---|---|---|---|---|---|
| Vikings | 7 | 3 | 17 | 3 | 30 |
| Chiefs | 2 | 3 | 0 | 7 | 12 |

at Arrowhead Stadium, Kansas City, Missouri

- Date: August 23
- Game time: 7:00 p.m. CDT
- Game weather: Sunny, 97 °F (36 °C)
- Game attendance: 73,442
- Referee: Walt Coleman (65)
- TV: KARE-11
- Recap, Game Book

Game information

First quarter

- MIN – Matt Cassel 53-yard pass to Cordarrelle Patterson (Blair Walsh kick), 9:56. Vikings 7–0. Drive: 5 plays, 97 yards, 2:55.
- KC – Matt Cassel fumble forced by Jaye Howard out of bounds in end zone for a safety, 3:42. Vikings 7–2.

Second quarter

- KC – Cairo Santos 21-yard field goal, 2:59. Vikings 7–5. Drive: 14 plays, 77 yards, 7:43.
- MIN – Blair Walsh 41-yard field goal, 1:07. Vikings 10–5. Drive: 5 plays, 30 yards, 0:29.

Third quarter

- MIN – Blair Walsh 32-yard field goal, 4:40. Vikings 13–5. Drive: 9 plays, 49 yards, 4:33.
- MIN – Teddy Bridgewater 8-yard pass to Allen Reisner (Blair Walsh kick), 2:08. Vikings 20–5. Drive: 3 plays, 8 yards, 0:55.
- MIN – Teddy Bridgewater 5-yard pass to Allen Reisner (Blair Walsh kick), 0:24. Vikings 27–5. Drive: 1 play, 5 yards, 0:05.

Fourth quarter

- MIN – Blair Walsh 28-yard field goal, 4:16. Vikings 30–5. Drive: 11 plays, 73 yards, 5:45.
- KC – Tyler Bray 1-yard pass to Albert Wilson (Cairo Santos kick), 0:25. Vikings 30–12. Drive: 9 plays, 80 yards, 3:51.

Top passers

- MIN – Matt Cassel – 9/17, 152 yards, TD
- KC – Alex Smith – 14/24, 140 yards

Top rushers

- MIN – Matt Asiata – 11 rushes, 48 yards
- KC – Cyrus Gray – 5 rushes, 31 yards

Top receivers

- MIN – Cordarrelle Patterson – 3 rec, 71 yards, TD
- KC – Travis Kelce – 4 rec, 49 yards

The Vikings traveled to Kansas City to play against Matt Cassel's former team. The defense played remarkably well, with Captain Munnerlyn, Chad Greenway and Shaun Prater each recording an interception. The Vikings' defense managed to hold the Chiefs to five points for a majority of the game until they got a touchdown in the final minute for a total of 12. For the third game running, Cassel was the starting quarterback and he played the majority of this game; he gained 152 passing yards with a touchdown pass to Cordarrelle Patterson, and threw a pick, the Vikings' only turnover of their preseason. Bridgewater also saw a little action; though he made few pass attempts, he gained 40 passing yards and made two touchdown passes to Allen Reisner.

==== Week 4: at Tennessee Titans ====
Preseason Week 4: Minnesota Vikings at Tennessee Titans – Game summary

| Quarter | 1 | 2 | 3 | 4 | Total |
|---|---|---|---|---|---|
| Vikings | 7 | 9 | 3 | 0 | 19 |
| Titans | 0 | 0 | 0 | 3 | 3 |

at LP Field, Nashville, Tennessee

- Date: August 28
- Game time: 7:00 p.m. CDT
- Game weather: Cloudy, 80 °F (27 °C)
- Game attendance: 69,143
- Referee: Clete Blakeman (34)
- TV: KARE-11
- Recap, Game Book

Game information

First quarter

- MIN – Teddy Bridgewater 3-yard pass to Adam Thielen (Blair Walsh kick), 8:54. Vikings 7–0. Drive: 12 plays, 80 yards, 6:06.

Second quarter

- MIN – Blair Walsh 45-yard field goal, 13:26. Vikings 10–0. Drive: 15 plays, 51 yards, 6:49.
- MIN – Blair Walsh 22-yard field goal, 5:03. Vikings 13–0. Drive: 9 plays, 60 yards, 4:23.
- MIN – Blair Walsh 35-yard field goal, 1:38. Vikings 16–0. Drive: 7 plays, 22 yards, 2:30.

Third quarter

- MIN – Blair Walsh 30-yard field goal, 2:40. Vikings 19–0. Drive: 14 plays, 68 yards, 8:17.

Fourth quarter

- TEN – Maikon Bonani 29-yard field goal, 7:08. Vikings 19–3. Drive: 15 plays, 69 yards, 7:43.

Top passers

- MIN – Christian Ponder – 12/15, 121 yards
- TEN – Zach Mettenberger – 12/17, 154 yards

Top rushers

- MIN – Joe Banyard – 18 rushes, 111 yards
- TEN – Antonio Andrews – 13 rushes, 78 yards

Top receivers

- MIN – Allen Reisner – 4 rec, 33 yards
- TEN – Justin Hunter – 2 rec, 53 yards

The Vikings traveled to Tennessee to face the Titans in the preseason finale. The Vikings' defense excelled in keeping the Titans to a minimal score, and recorded a strip sack by Corey Wootton and an interception by Julian Posey. Teddy Bridgewater was the starter for this game, and led the Vikings to score 10 points in their first two drives. Christian Ponder then took over for the rest of the game, leading three more scoring drives, though he and the offense were unable to score any touchdowns.

== Regular season ==
=== Schedule ===
| Week | Date | Opponent | Result | Record | Venue | Attendance | NFL.com recap |
|---|---|---|---|---|---|---|---|
| 1 | September 7 | at St. Louis Rams | W 34–6 | 1–0 | Edward Jones Dome | 55,919 | Recap |
| 2 | September 14 | New England Patriots | L 7–30 | 1–1 | TCF Bank Stadium | 52,350 | Recap |
| 3 | September 21 | at New Orleans Saints | L 9–20 | 1–2 | Mercedes-Benz Superdome | 73,005 | Recap |
| 4 | September 28 | Atlanta Falcons | W 41–28 | 2–2 | TCF Bank Stadium | 52,173 | Recap |
| 5 | October 2 | at Green Bay Packers | L 10–42 | 2–3 | Lambeau Field | 78,054 | Recap |
| 6 | October 12 | Detroit Lions | L 3–17 | 2–4 | TCF Bank Stadium | 52,213 | Recap |
| 7 | October 19 | at Buffalo Bills | L 16–17 | 2–5 | Ralph Wilson Stadium | 68,477 | Recap |
| 8 | October 26 | at Tampa Bay Buccaneers | W 19–13 (OT) | 3–5 | Raymond James Stadium | 56,577 | Recap |
| 9 | November 2 | Washington Redskins | W 29–26 | 4–5 | TCF Bank Stadium | 52,252 | Recap |
| 10 | Bye | | | | | | |
| 11 | November 16 | at Chicago Bears | L 13–21 | 4–6 | Soldier Field | 61,792 | Recap |
| 12 | November 23 | Green Bay Packers | L 21–24 | 4–7 | TCF Bank Stadium | 52,386 | Recap |
| 13 | November 30 | Carolina Panthers | W 31–13 | 5–7 | TCF Bank Stadium | 52,016 | Recap |
| 14 | December 7 | New York Jets | W 30–24 (OT) | 6–7 | TCF Bank Stadium | 52,152 | Recap |
| 15 | December 14 | at Detroit Lions | L 14–16 | 6–8 | Ford Field | 62,490 | Recap |
| 16 | December 21 | at Miami Dolphins | L 35–37 | 6–9 | Sun Life Stadium | 66,203 | Recap |
| 17 | December 28 | Chicago Bears | W 13–9 | 7–9 | TCF Bank Stadium | 52,364 | Recap |

Note: Division rivals are marked with bold text.

=== Game summaries ===
==== Week 1: at St. Louis Rams ====
Week 1: Minnesota Vikings at St. Louis Rams – Game summary

| Quarter | 1 | 2 | 3 | 4 | Total |
|---|---|---|---|---|---|
| Vikings | 3 | 10 | 7 | 14 | 34 |
| Rams | 0 | 0 | 3 | 3 | 6 |

at Edward Jones Dome, St. Louis, Missouri

- Date: September 7
- Game time: 12:00 p.m. CDT
- Game weather: None (indoor stadium)
- Game attendance: 55,919
- Referee: Ed Hochuli (85)
- TV announcers (Fox): Dick Stockton, Kirk Morrison and Kristina Pink
- Recap, Game Book

Game information

First quarter

- MIN – Blair Walsh 52-yard field goal, 9:37. Vikings 3–0. Drive: 11 plays, 56 yards, 5:23.

Second quarter

- MIN – Blair Walsh 46-yard field goal, 14:16. Vikings 6–0. Drive: 5 plays, 32 yards, 1:53.
- MIN – Greg Jennings 8-yard pass from Matt Cassel (Blair Walsh kick), 0:21. Vikings 13–0. Drive: 4 plays, 35 yards, 0:48.

Third quarter

- STL – Greg Zuerlein 56-yard field goal, 10:11. Vikings 13–3. Drive: 9 plays, 42 yards, 4:49.
- MIN – Cordarrelle Patterson 67-yard run (Blair Walsh kick), 1:54. Vikings 20–3. Drive: 1 play, 67 yards, 0:14.

Fourth quarter

- MIN – Kyle Rudolph 7-yard pass from Matt Cassel (Blair Walsh kick), 6:27. Vikings 27–3. Drive: 9 plays, 70 yards, 5:23.
- MIN – Harrison Smith 81-yard interception return (Blair Walsh kick), 2:57. Vikings 34–3.
- STL – Greg Zuerlein 46-yard field goal, 1:31. Vikings 34–6. Drive: 8 plays, 52 yards, 1:26.

Top passers

- MIN – Matt Cassel – 17/25, 170 yards, 2 TD
- STL – Austin Davis – 16/23, 192 yards

Top rushers

- MIN – Cordarrelle Patterson – 3 rushes, 102 yards, TD
- STL – Zac Stacy – 11 rushes, 43 yards

Top receivers

- MIN – Greg Jennings – 6 receptions, 58 yards, TD
- STL – Brian Quick – 7 receptions, 99 yards

The Vikings opened their season on the road against the St. Louis Rams and took the lead in the first half with a field goal in each quarter from 52 yards and 46 yards, respectively, from third-year kicker Blair Walsh and an eight-yard touchdown pass from Matt Cassel to Greg Jennings with 21 seconds left in the half, set up by an interception from Josh Robinson at the Rams' 35-yard line. The Rams struck back early in the third quarter with a field goal from Greg Zuerlein before Vikings wide receiver Cordarrelle Patterson made the play of the game with a 67-yard touchdown run. The Vikings secured the game late in the fourth quarter as TE Kyle Rudolph connected with Cassel on a seven-yard touchdown pass, while Rudolph's former Notre Dame teammate Harrison Smith took an interception 81 yards for the Vikings' fourth touchdown of the game. Zuerlein added another field goal late in the game to make the final score 34–6 to the Vikings, their first road victory since week 16 of the 2012 season against the Houston Texans.

==== Week 2: vs. New England Patriots ====
Week 2: New England Patriots at Minnesota Vikings – Game summary

| Quarter | 1 | 2 | 3 | 4 | Total |
|---|---|---|---|---|---|
| Patriots | 10 | 14 | 3 | 3 | 30 |
| Vikings | 7 | 0 | 0 | 0 | 7 |

at TCF Bank Stadium, Minneapolis, Minnesota

- Date: September 14
- Game time: 12:00 p.m. CDT
- Game weather: Partly cloudy, 58 °F (14 °C)
- Game attendance: 52,350
- Referee: Tony Corrente (99)
- TV announcers (CBS): Ian Eagle, Dan Fouts and Jenny Dell
- Recap, Game Book

Game information

First quarter

- MIN – Matt Asiata 25-yard pass from Matt Cassel (Blair Walsh kick), 10:54. Vikings 7–0. Drive: 7 plays, 80 yards, 4:06.
- NE – Stevan Ridley 1-yard run (Stephen Gostkowski kick), 6:14. Tied 7–7. Drive: 2 plays, 1 yard, 0:43.
- NE – Stephen Gostkowski 48-yard field goal, 0:32. Patriots 10–7. Drive: 10 plays, 40 yards, 4:11.

Second quarter

- NE – Julian Edelman 9-yard pass from Tom Brady (Stephen Gostkowski kick), 9:30. Patriots 17–7. Drive: 7 plays, 61 yards, 4:00.
- NE – Chandler Jones 58-yard return of blocked field goal (Stephen Gostkowski kick), 0:09. Patriots 24–7.

Third quarter

- NE – Stephen Gostkowski 47-yard field goal, 8:32. Patriots 27–7. Drive: 5 plays, 17 yards, 1:10.

Fourth quarter

- NE – Stephen Gostkowski 27-yard field goal, 14:57. Patriots 30–7. Drive: 11 plays, 46 yards, 6:49.

Top passers

- NE – Tom Brady – 15/22, 149 yards, TD
- MIN – Matt Cassel – 19/36, 202 yards, TD, 4 INT

Top rushers

- NE – Stevan Ridley – 25 rushes, 101 yards, TD
- MIN – Matt Asiata – 13 rushes, 36 yards

Top receivers

- NE – Julian Edelman – 6 receptions, 81 yards, TD
- MIN – Cordarrelle Patterson – 4 receptions, 56 yards

The Vikings began their opening home game of the season without Adrian Peterson, who was deactivated after being charged with negligent injury of a child for allegedly beating his four-year-old son with a tree branch. He was replaced in the starting lineup by Matt Asiata, who got the Vikings off to a good start with a 25-yard touchdown reception from Matt Cassel on the game's opening possession. The defense then forced the Patriots into a three-and-out, only for Cassel to throw an interception attempting to find Jarius Wright deep downfield. Devin McCourty returned the ball 60 yards to the Minnesota 1-yard line, and two plays later, Stevan Ridley ran in to tie the scores. A second interception early in the second quarter resulted in another scoring drive for New England, as Tom Brady connected with Julian Edelman on a nine-yard TD catch. As the first half drew to a close, the Vikings drove downfield to give Blair Walsh a 48-yard field goal attempt with 19 seconds on the clock; however, Patriots DE Chandler Jones was able to burst through the Minnesota offensive line and block the kick before scooping up the ball and returning it 58 yards for the Patriots' third TD of the half.

After the break, Cassel threw another two interceptions, one in each quarter, with the first resulting in a 47-yard Stephen Gostkowski field goal. The second occurred with six minutes left in the game, and the Patriots were able to hang onto possession until the two-minute warning before turning the ball over on downs at the Minnesota 19-yard line. Aided by two pass interference penalties, Cassel led the Vikings down the field and thought he had managed to cut into the New England lead with a 16-yard pass to Greg Jennings with 41 seconds to play, only for Jennings to be ruled out of bounds before gaining possession of the ball. Cassel was then sacked for a 14-yard loss on the next play and the game finished as a 30–7 Patriots win.

==== Week 3: at New Orleans Saints ====
Week 3: Minnesota Vikings at New Orleans Saints – Game summary

| Quarter | 1 | 2 | 3 | 4 | Total |
|---|---|---|---|---|---|
| Vikings | 0 | 6 | 3 | 0 | 9 |
| Saints | 13 | 0 | 0 | 7 | 20 |

at Mercedes-Benz Superdome, New Orleans, Louisiana

- Date: September 21
- Game time: 12:00 p.m. CDT
- Game weather: None (indoor stadium)
- Game attendance: 73,005
- Referee: Walt Anderson (66)
- TV announcers (Fox): Chris Myers, Ronde Barber and Jennifer Hale
- Recap, Game Book

Game information

First quarter

- NO – Pierre Thomas 1-yard run (Shayne Graham kick), 9:36. Saints 7–0. Drive: 11 plays, 80 yards, 5:24.
- NO – Josh Hill 34-yard pass from Drew Brees (kick blocked), 4:50. Saints 13–0. Drive: 7 plays, 82 yards, 3:39.

Second quarter

- MIN – Blair Walsh 25-yard field goal, 14:06. Saints 13–3. Drive: 13 plays, 71 yards, 5:44.
- MIN – Blair Walsh 30-yard field goal, 6:28. Saints 13–6. Drive: 10 plays, 51 yards, 5:47.

Third quarter

- MIN – Blair Walsh 40-yard field goal, 10:20. Saints 13–9. Drive: 10 plays, 43 yards, 4:40.

Fourth quarter

- NO – Marques Colston 18-yard pass from Drew Brees (Shayne Graham kick), 12:22. Saints 20–9. Drive: 12 plays, 90 yards, 5:28.

Top passers

- MIN – Teddy Bridgewater – 12/20, 150 yards
- NO – Drew Brees – 27/35, 293 yards, 2 TD

Top rushers

- MIN – Matt Asiata – 12 rushes, 35 yards
- NO – Khiry Robinson – 18 rushes, 69 yards

Top receivers

- MIN – Greg Jennings – 5 receptions, 70 yards
- NO – Brandin Cooks – 8 receptions, 74 yards

After initially stating that Adrian Peterson would return to the active roster for their Week 3 game at New Orleans, the Vikings later placed the running back on the inactive list indefinitely, pending the outcome of the court case against him. Despite coming into the game at 0–3, the Saints started well, scoring two touchdowns on their first two drives, although DE Everson Griffen was able to block the extra point attempt on the second. The Vikings responded to going 13–0 down with two field goals from 25 and 30 yards respectively, but an injury to Matt Cassel meant a debut for rookie QB Teddy Bridgewater.

K Blair Walsh hit a 40-yard field goal to open the second half for the Vikings, but New Orleans closed the game out with an 18-yard touchdown pass from Drew Brees to Marques Colston early in the fourth quarter. They were aided on the drive by a penalty for unnecessary roughness against CB Captain Munnerlyn for a tackle on Brees, but many thought that Brees should also have been penalized for his reaction and the penalties offset. Regardless, the Vikings were forced to punt on their next possession and the Saints were able to run out the clock for a 20–9 win.

==== Week 4: vs. Atlanta Falcons ====
Week 4: Atlanta Falcons at Minnesota Vikings – Game summary

| Quarter | 1 | 2 | 3 | 4 | Total |
|---|---|---|---|---|---|
| Falcons | 7 | 7 | 14 | 0 | 28 |
| Vikings | 14 | 10 | 3 | 14 | 41 |

at TCF Bank Stadium, Minneapolis, Minnesota

- Date: September 28
- Game time: 3:25 p.m. CDT
- Game weather: Partly cloudy, 82 °F (28 °C)
- Game attendance: 52,173
- Referee: Ron Torbert (62)
- TV announcers (Fox): Chris Myers, Ronde Barber and Jennifer Hale
- Recap, Game Book

Game information

First quarter

- MIN – Matt Asiata 3-yard run (Blair Walsh kick), 9:27. Vikings 7–0. Drive: 8 plays, 73 yards, 5:24.
- ATL – Roddy White 24-yard pass from Matt Ryan (Matt Bryant kick), 3:56. Tied 7–7. Drive: 11 plays, 80 yards, 5:31.
- MIN – Matt Asiata 6-yard run (Blair Walsh kick), 1:31. Vikings 14–7. Drive: 5 plays, 53 yards, 2:25.

Second quarter

- ATL – Patrick DiMarco 1-yard pass from Matt Ryan (Matt Bryant kick), 5:56. Tied 14–14. Drive: 13 plays, 61 yards, 5:26.
- MIN – Teddy Bridgewater 13-yard run (Blair Walsh kick), 1:59. Vikings 21–14. Drive: 9 plays, 80 yards, 3:57.
- MIN – Blair Walsh 18-yard field goal, 0:02. Vikings 24–14. Drive: 10 plays, 84 yards, 1:23.

Third quarter

- MIN – Blair Walsh 41-yard field goal, 10:40. Vikings 27–14. Drive: 8 plays, 43 yards, 4:20.
- ATL – Devin Hester 36-yard pass from Matt Ryan (Matt Bryant kick), 7:19. Vikings 27–21. Drive: 7 plays, 80 yards, 3:21.
- ATL – Antone Smith 48-yard run (Matt Bryant kick), 1:31. Falcons 28–27. Drive: 4 plays, 63 yards, 1:16.

Fourth quarter

- MIN – Matt Asiata 1-yard run (Teddy Bridgewater–Rhett Ellison pass), 10:50. Vikings 35–28. Drive: 9 plays, 78 yards, 3:51.
- MIN – Blair Walsh 55-yard field goal, 3:38. Vikings 38–28. Drive: 5 plays, 18 yards, 2:51.
- MIN – Blair Walsh 33-yard field goal, 1:14. Vikings 41–28. Drive: 7 plays, 15 yards, 2:11.

Top passers

- ATL – Matt Ryan – 25/41, 298 yards, 3 TD
- MIN – Teddy Bridgewater – 19/30, 317 yards

Top rushers

- ATL – Antone Smith – 4 rushes, 62 yards
- MIN – Jerick McKinnon – 18 rushes, 135 yards

Top receivers

- ATL – Julio Jones – 6 receptions, 82 yards
- MIN – Jarius Wright – 8 receptions, 132 yards

Having lost Matt Cassel for the season, the Vikings gave Teddy Bridgewater his first career start at home to the Falcons in week 4, but it was running back Matt Asiata who opened the scoring with a 3-yard touchdown run. Roddy White leveled the scores with a 24-yard catch from Matt Ryan, but a 49-yard kickoff return from Cordarrelle Patterson set the Vikings up with a short field on the next drive, which Asiata finished with a 6-yard run to restore Minnesota's seven-point lead. Steven Jackson thought he had tied the scores again on a 3-yard run with six minutes to go in the half, only for the touchdown call to be overturned on review; however, Ryan was able to find FB Patrick DiMarco in the flat on the next play. However, Bridgewater himself restored Minnesota's advantage on the ensuing possession, capping an 80-yard drive with a 13-yard touchdown run as the game entered its first two-minute warning. After forcing Atlanta into a quick three-and-out, Bridgewater led the Vikings downfield to the brink of another touchdown, but a lack of time meant they had to settle for an 18-yard Blair Walsh field goal to give them a 24–14 lead at the half.

Walsh scored another field goal on the opening drive of the second half, but long touchdowns for Devin Hester and Antone Smith gave the Falcons a one-point lead going into the fourth quarter. Those would prove to be Atlanta's last points of the game as Asiata picked up his third TD run early in the fourth quarter, with Bridgewater adding two points with a pass to Rhett Ellison. Bridgewater was injured on that drive, meaning that third-string QB Christian Ponder came in for his first appearance of the season. However, his job was simply to hand the ball off to rookie running back Jerick McKinnon, who set up a 55-yard field goal attempt for Walsh. An interception by Harrison Smith led to another field goal from 33 yards, before Josh Robinson closed the game out with another interception.

==== Week 5: at Green Bay Packers ====
Week 5: Minnesota Vikings at Green Bay Packers – Game summary

| Quarter | 1 | 2 | 3 | 4 | Total |
|---|---|---|---|---|---|
| Vikings | 0 | 0 | 0 | 10 | 10 |
| Packers | 14 | 14 | 14 | 0 | 42 |

at Lambeau Field, Green Bay, Wisconsin

- Date: October 2
- Game time: 7:30 p.m. CDT
- Game weather: Rain, 62 °F (17 °C)
- Game attendance: 78,054
- Referee: Brad Allen (122)
- TV announcers (CBS/NFLN): Jim Nantz, Phil Simms and Tracy Wolfson
- Recap, Game Book

Game information

First quarter

- GB – Randall Cobb 8-yard pass from Aaron Rodgers (Mason Crosby kick), 9:39. Packers 7–0. Drive: 4 plays, 61 yards, 2:04.
- GB – Jordy Nelson 66-yard pass from Aaron Rodgers (Mason Crosby kick), 5:18. Packers 14–0. Drive: 4 plays, 81 yards, 1:32.

Second quarter

- GB – Julius Peppers 49-yard interception return (Mason Crosby kick), 6:51. Packers 21–0.
- GB – Davante Adams 11-yard pass from Aaron Rodgers (Mason Crosby kick), 4:51. Packers 28–0. Drive: 3 plays, 20 yards, 1:15.

Third quarter

- GB – Eddie Lacy 11-yard run (Mason Crosby kick), 10:33. Packers 35–0. Drive: 6 plays, 70 yards, 2:59.
- GB – Eddie Lacy 10-yard run (Mason Crosby kick), 3:42. Packers 42–0. Drive: 7 plays, 52 yards, 4:49.

Fourth quarter

- MIN – Christian Ponder 6-yard run (Blair Walsh kick), 14:54. Packers 42–7. Drive: 7 plays, 62 yards, 3:48.
- MIN – Blair Walsh 26-yard field goal, 10:07. Packers 42–10. Drive: 7 plays, 22 yards, 3:13.

Top passers

- MIN – Christian Ponder – 22/44, 222 yards
- GB – Aaron Rodgers – 12/17, 156 yards, 3 TD

Top rushers

- MIN – Matt Asiata – 15 rushes, 72 yards
- GB – Eddie Lacy – 13 rushes, 105 yards, 2 TD

Top receivers

- MIN – Adam Thielen – 4 receptions, 57 yards
- GB – Jordy Nelson – 1 reception, 66 yards, TD

With only four days between games, Teddy Bridgewater had insufficient time to recover from the injury he picked up in week 4 and Christian Ponder made his first start since week 12 of the 2013 season. The Vikings defense forced Green Bay to punt on the first possession of the game, but soon kicked the ball back to the Packers, allowing Eddie Lacy's running to set up an 8-yard touchdown pass from Aaron Rodgers to Randall Cobb. The Vikings' ensuing possession again ended with a punt, and Rodgers punished them with a 66-yard TD pass to Jordy Nelson. The teams traded possession as the game moved into the second quarter, until Ponder threw the ball directly to Packers DE Julius Peppers, who returned the interception 49 yards for his team's third TD of the game. Two plays later, Ponder was picked off again, this time by LB Jamari Lattimore, leaving a short field for Rodgers to work into before throwing an 11-yard TD pass to WR Davante Adams.

The second half began in much the same vein, as the Packers forced a Vikings punt on the first possession before marching downfield to set Lacy up for an 11-yard scoring run. The running back went into the end zone again at the end of the Packers' next possession with a 10-yard run, giving the home team a 42–0 lead. CB Marcus Sherels returned the ensuing kickoff 46 yards, and Ponder was able to pass downfield to the Green Bay 6-yard line, from where he ran into the end zone for the Vikings' first points of the game. Three plays later, Harrison Smith picked off a pass from Matt Flynn at the Green Bay 30-yard line, but the Vikings were unable to get into the end zone despite the short field and had to settle for a 26-yard Blair Walsh field goal. As the game drew to a close, the Vikings regained possession and drove down to the Packers' 8-yard line, only to be denied on 4th-and-goal, allowing Green Bay to end the game with a kneeldown.

==== Week 6: vs. Detroit Lions ====
Week 6: Detroit Lions at Minnesota Vikings – Game summary

| Quarter | 1 | 2 | 3 | 4 | Total |
|---|---|---|---|---|---|
| Lions | 7 | 3 | 0 | 7 | 17 |
| Vikings | 0 | 0 | 0 | 3 | 3 |

at TCF Bank Stadium, Minneapolis, Minnesota

- Date: October 12
- Game time: 12:00 p.m. CDT
- Game weather: Sunny, 53 °F (12 °C)
- Game attendance: 52,213
- Referee: John Parry (132)
- TV announcers (Fox): Mike Goldberg, Brendon Ayanbadejo and Peter Schrager
- Recap, Game Book

Game information

First quarter

- DET – Theo Riddick 9-yard pass from Matthew Stafford (Matt Prater kick), 11:06. Lions 7–0. Drive: 7 plays, 80 yards, 3:54.

Second quarter

- DET – Matt Prater 52-yard field goal, 0:07. Lions 10–0. Drive: 5 plays, 17 yards, 0:38.

Third quarter

- No scoring plays.

Fourth quarter

- DET – Joique Bell 1-yard run (Matt Prater kick), 11:44. Lions 17–0. Drive: 14 plays, 60 yards, 7:54.
- MIN – Blair Walsh 40-yard field goal, 4:53. Lions 17–3. Drive: 11 plays, 45 yards, 4:21.

Top passers

- DET – Matthew Stafford – 19/33, 185 yards, TD
- MIN – Teddy Bridgewater – 23/37, 188 yards

Top rushers

- DET – Joique Bell – 18 rushes, 74 yards, TD
- MIN – Jerick McKinnon – 11 rushes, 40 yards

Top receivers

- DET – Theo Riddick – 5 receptions, 75 yards, TD
- MIN – Jerick McKinnon – 6 receptions, 42 yards

The Vikings were defeated at home by the Lions 17-3. This game, while not broadcast nationally, gained widespread attention due to play by play announcer Mike Goldberg's commentating style, which was received quite negatively due to his botching of several plays and getting players and coaches names wrong. As it turned out, this would be the only game Goldberg ever broadcast on FOX. He was originally going to broadcast the Vikings next game at Buffalo, but he was replaced by Tim Brando instead.

==== Week 7: at Buffalo Bills ====
Week 7: Minnesota Vikings at Buffalo Bills – Game summary

| Quarter | 1 | 2 | 3 | 4 | Total |
|---|---|---|---|---|---|
| Vikings | 3 | 10 | 0 | 3 | 16 |
| Bills | 0 | 10 | 0 | 7 | 17 |

at Ralph Wilson Stadium, Orchard Park, New York

- Date: October 19
- Game time: 1:00 p.m. EDT/12:00 p.m. CDT
- Game weather: Cloudy, 41 °F (5 °C)
- Game attendance: 68,477
- Referee: Ed Hochuli (85)
- TV announcers (Fox): Tim Brando, Brendon Ayanbadejo and Peter Schrager
- Recap, Game Book

Game information

First quarter

- MIN – Blair Walsh 40-yard field goal, 1:50. Vikings 3–0. Drive: 4 plays, 5 yards, 1:59.

Second quarter

- BUF – Sammy Watkins 26-yard pass from Kyle Orton (Dan Carpenter kick), 9:23. Bills 7–3. Drive: 1 play, 26 yards, 0:05.
- MIN – Cordarrelle Patterson 4-yard pass from Teddy Bridgewater (Blair Walsh kick), 6:17. Vikings 10–7. Drive: 5 plays, 60 yards, 3:06.
- BUF – Dan Carpenter 31-yard field goal, 4:01. Tied 10–10. Drive: 6 plays, 66 yards, 2:16.
- MIN – Blair Walsh 55-yard field goal, 0:15. Vikings 13–10. Drive: 5 plays, 22 yards, 1:04.

Third quarter

- No scoring plays.

Fourth quarter

- MIN – Blair Walsh 33-yard field goal, 11:45. Vikings 16–10. Drive: 12 plays, 36 yards, 5:43.
- BUF – Sammy Watkins 2-yard pass from Kyle Orton (Dan Carpenter kick), 0:01. Bills 17–16. Drive: 15 plays, 80 yards, 3:06.

Top passers

- MIN – Teddy Bridgewater – 15/26, 157 yards, TD
- BUF – Kyle Orton – 31/43, 283 yards, 2 TD

Top rushers

- MIN – Jerick McKinnon – 19 rushes, 103 yards
- BUF – C. J. Spiller – 1 rush, 53 yards

Top receivers

- MIN – Greg Jennings – 6 receptions, 77 yards
- BUF – Sammy Watkins – 9 receptions, 122 yards, 2 TD

==== Week 8: at Tampa Bay Buccaneers ====
Week 8: Minnesota Vikings at Tampa Bay Buccaneers – Game summary

| Quarter | 1 | 2 | 3 | 4 | OT | Total |
|---|---|---|---|---|---|---|
| Vikings | 0 | 3 | 7 | 3 | 6 | 19 |
| Buccaneers | 0 | 0 | 0 | 13 | 0 | 13 |

at Raymond James Stadium, Tampa, Florida

- Date: October 26
- Game time: 1:00 p.m. EDT/12:00 p.m. CDT
- Game weather: Sunny, 77 °F (25 °C)
- Game attendance: 56,577
- Referee: Craig Wrolstad (4)
- TV announcers (Fox): Justin Kutcher, David Diehl and Laura Okmin
- Recap, Game Book

Game information

First quarter

- No scoring plays.

Second quarter

- MIN – Blair Walsh 46-yard field goal, 0:00. Vikings 3–0. Drive: 5 plays, 38 yards, 0:59.

Third quarter

- MIN – Greg Jennings 17-yard pass from Teddy Bridgewater (Blair Walsh kick), 7:09. Vikings 10–0. Drive: 6 plays, 63 yards, 3:09.

Fourth quarter

- TB – Patrick Murray 54-yard field goal, 14:12. Vikings 10–3. Drive: 5 plays, 15 yards, 1:27.
- TB – Patrick Murray 45-yard field goal, 7:19. Vikings 10–6. Drive: 7 plays, 53 yards, 3:44.
- TB – Austin Seferian-Jenkins 7-yard pass from Mike Glennon (Patrick Murray kick), 2:02. Tampa Bay 13–10. Drive: 9 plays, 71 yards, 3:38.
- MIN – Blair Walsh 38-yard field goal, 0:00. Tied 13–13. Drive: 9 plays, 61 yards, 2:02.

Overtime

- MIN – Anthony Barr 27-yard fumble return, 14:43. Vikings 19–13.

Top passers

- MIN – Teddy Bridgewater – 24/42, 241 yards, TD
- TB – Mike Glennon – 19/28, 171 yards, TD

Top rushers

- MIN – Jerick McKinnon – 16 rushes, 83 yards
- TB – Doug Martin – 10 rushes, 27 yards

Top receivers

- MIN – Cordarrelle Patterson – 6 receptions, 86 yards
- TB – Mike Evans – 4 receptions, 78 yards

==== Week 9: vs. Washington Redskins ====
Week 9: Washington Redskins at Minnesota Vikings – Game summary

| Quarter | 1 | 2 | 3 | 4 | Total |
|---|---|---|---|---|---|
| Redskins | 3 | 7 | 10 | 6 | 26 |
| Vikings | 0 | 7 | 7 | 15 | 29 |

at TCF Bank Stadium, Minneapolis, Minnesota

- Date: November 2
- Game time: 12:00 p.m. CST
- Game weather: Sunny, 50 °F (10 °C)
- Game attendance: 52,252
- Referee: Gene Steratore (114)
- TV announcers (Fox): Chris Myers, Ronde Barber and Jennifer Hale
- Recap, Game Book

Game information

First quarter

- WAS – Kai Forbath 36-yard field goal, 6:16. Redskins 3–0. Drive: 13 plays, 62 yards, 7:49.

Second quarter

- WAS – Alfred Morris 14-yard run, 14:46. Redskins 10–0. Drive: 6 plays, 91 yards, 2:22.
- MIN – Chase Ford 20-yard pass from Teddy Bridgewater (Blair Walsh kick), 0:36. Redskins 10–7. Drive: 4 plays, 46 yards, 0:23.

Third quarter

- MIN – Matt Asiata 1-yard run (Blair Walsh kick), 10:44. Vikings 14–10. Drive: 6 plays, 56 yards, 2:15.
- WAS – DeSean Jackson 13-yard pass from Robert Griffin III (Kai Forbath kick), 7:23. Redskins 17–14. Drive: 7 plays, 56 yards, 3:21.
- WAS – Kai Forbath 26-yard field goal, 1:57. Redskins 20–14. Drive: 9 plays, 43 yards, 3:26.

Fourth quarter

- MIN – Matt Asiata 7-yard run (Blair Walsh kick), 13:00. Vikings 21–20. Drive: 10 plays, 76 yards, 3:57.
- WAS – Alfred Morris 2-yard run (run failed), 9:01. Redskins 26–21. Drive: 8 plays, 80 yards, 3:59.
- MIN – Matt Asiata 1-yard run (Matt Asiata run), 3:27. Vikings 29–26. Drive: 12 plays, 73 yards, 5:34.

Top passers

- WAS – Robert Griffin III – 18/28, 251 yards, TD
- MIN – Teddy Bridgewater – 26/42, 268 yards, TD

Top rushers

- WAS – Alfred Morris – 19 rushes, 92 yards, 2 TD
- MIN – Jerick McKinnon – 14 rushes, 54 yards

Top receivers

- WAS – DeSean Jackson – 4 receptions, 120 yards, TD
- MIN – Greg Jennings – 6 receptions, 76 yards

With the close win over the Redskins, the Vikings improved to 4–5. Teddy Bridgewater's third win as a starting rookie quarterback breaks the franchise record (two wins) shared by both Fran Tarkenton and Christian Ponder.

==== Week 10: Bye ====
The Vikings took their bye week in week 10, along with the Texans, Colts, Patriots, Chargers and Redskins.

==== Week 11: at Chicago Bears ====
Week 11: Minnesota Vikings at Chicago Bears – Game summary

| Quarter | 1 | 2 | 3 | 4 | Total |
|---|---|---|---|---|---|
| Vikings | 10 | 0 | 0 | 3 | 13 |
| Bears | 0 | 14 | 0 | 7 | 21 |

at Soldier Field, Chicago, Illinois

- Date: November 16
- Game time: 12:00 p.m. CST
- Game weather: Cloudy, flurries, 31 °F (−1 °C)
- Game attendance: 61,792
- Referee: Ron Torbert (62)
- TV announcers (CBS): Kevin Harlan, Rich Gannon and Stacey Dales
- Recap, Game Book

Game information

First quarter

- MIN – Blair Walsh 50-yard field goal, 11:21. Vikings 3–0. Drive: 7 plays, 39 yards, 3:39.
- MIN – Rhett Ellison 7-yard pass from Teddy Bridgewater (Blair Walsh kick), 3:16. Vikings 10–0. Drive: 5 plays, 63 yards, 2:46.

Second quarter

- CHI – Alshon Jeffery 27-yard pass from Jay Cutler (Robbie Gould kick), 13:06. Vikings 10–7. Drive: 10 plays, 81 yards, 5:10.
- CHI – Brandon Marshall 44-yard pass from Jay Cutler (Robbie Gould kick), 2:49. Bears 14–10. Drive: 4 plays, 73 yards, 1:47.

Third quarter

- No scoring plays.

Fourth quarter

- CHI – Brandon Marshall 4-yard pass from Jay Cutler (Robbie Gould kick), 8:51. Bears 21–10. Drive: 16 plays, 72 yards, 7:35.
- MIN – Blair Walsh 26-yard field goal, 4:04. Bears 21–13. Drive: 9 plays, 52 yards, 4:47.

Top passers

- MIN – Teddy Bridgewater – 18/28, 158 yards, TD
- CHI – Jay Cutler – 31/43, 330 yards, 3 TD

Top rushers

- MIN – Andrew Sendejo – 1 rush, 48 yards
- CHI – Matt Forté – 26 rushes, 117 yards

Top receivers

- MIN – Charles Johnson – 6 receptions, 87 yards
- CHI – Alshon Jeffery – 11 receptions, 135 yards, TD

==== Week 12: vs. Green Bay Packers ====
Week 12: Green Bay Packers at Minnesota Vikings – Game summary

| Quarter | 1 | 2 | 3 | 4 | Total |
|---|---|---|---|---|---|
| Packers | 7 | 7 | 3 | 7 | 24 |
| Vikings | 0 | 10 | 3 | 8 | 21 |

at TCF Bank Stadium, Minneapolis, Minnesota

- Date: November 23
- Game time: 12:00 p.m. CST
- Game weather: Cloudy, 49 °F (9 °C)
- Game attendance: 52,386
- Referee: Clete Blakeman (34)
- TV announcers (Fox): Kenny Albert, Daryl Johnston and Tony Siragusa
- Recap, Game Book

Game information

First quarter

- GB – Eddie Lacy 7-run (Mason Crosby kick), 1:34. Packers 7–0. Drive: 6 plays, 54 yards, 3:10.

Second quarter

- MIN – Charles Johnson 22-yard pass from Teddy Bridgewater (Blair Walsh kick), 11:06. Tied 7–7. Drive: 14 plays, 74 yards, 5:28.
- GB – Richard Rodgers 1-yard pass from Aaron Rodgers (Mason Crosby kick), 5:23. Packers 14–7. Drive: 4 plays, 53 yards, 1:59.
- MIN – Blair Walsh 39-yard field goal, 0:16. Packers 14–10. Drive: 11 plays, 42 yards, 5:07.

Third quarter

- MIN – Blair Walsh 51-yard field goal, 6:42. Packers 14–13. Drive: 7 plays, 17 yards, 1:53.
- GB – Mason Crosby 48-yard field goal, 2:41. Packers 17–13. Drive: 9 plays, 50 yards, 4:01.

Fourth quarter

- GB – Eddie Lacy 10-yard pass from Aaron Rodgers (Mason Crosby kick), 8:34. Packers 24–13. Drive: 11 plays, 87 yards, 6:18.
- MIN – Greg Jennings 5-yard pass from Teddy Bridgewater (Teddy Bridgewater to Charles Johnson pass), 3:23. Packers 24–21. Drive: 13 plays, 79 yards, 5:11.

Top passers

- GB – Aaron Rodgers – 19/29, 209 yards, 2 TD
- MIN – Teddy Bridgewater – 21/37, 210 yards, 2 TD

Top rushers

- GB – Eddie Lacy – 25 rushes, 125 yards, TD
- MIN – Jerick McKinnon – 15 rushes, 54 yards

Top receivers

- GB – Jordy Nelson – 8 receptions, 68 yards
- MIN – Charles Johnson – 3 receptions, 52 yards, TD

==== Week 13: vs. Carolina Panthers ====
Week 13: Carolina Panthers at Minnesota Vikings – Game summary

| Quarter | 1 | 2 | 3 | 4 | Total |
|---|---|---|---|---|---|
| Panthers | 3 | 3 | 7 | 0 | 13 |
| Vikings | 14 | 14 | 0 | 3 | 31 |

at TCF Bank Stadium, Minneapolis, Minnesota

- Date: November 30
- Game time: 12:00 p.m. CST
- Game weather: Sunny, 12 °F (−11 °C)
- Game attendance: 52,016
- Referee: Brad Allen (122)
- TV announcers (Fox): Chris Myers, Ronde Barber and Jennifer Hale
- Recap, Game Book

Game information

First quarter

- MIN – Kyle Rudolph 4-yard pass from Teddy Bridgewater (Blair Walsh kick), 9:41. Vikings 7–0. Drive: 6 plays, 45 yards, 3:07.
- MIN – Adam Thielen 30-yard return of blocked punt (Blair Walsh kick), 7:00. Vikings 14–0.
- CAR – Graham Gano 30-yard field goal, 0:37. Vikings 14–3. Drive: 14 plays, 68 yards, 6:23.

Second quarter

- MIN – Everson Griffen 43-yard return of blocked punt (Blair Walsh kick), 9:35. Vikings 21–3.
- CAR – Graham Gano 35-yard field goal, 3:28. Vikings 21–6. Drive: 12 plays, 63 yards, 6:07.
- MIN – Greg Jennings 17-yard pass from Teddy Bridgewater (Blair Walsh kick), 0:16. Vikings 28–6. Drive: 11 plays, 80 yards, 3:12.

Third quarter

- CAR – Philly Brown 32-yard pass from Cam Newton (Graham Gano kick), 9:15. Vikings 28–13. Drive: 8 plays, 80 yards, 4:13.

Fourth quarter

- MIN – Blair Walsh 39-yard field goal, 8:55. Vikings 31–13. Drive: 6 plays, 19 yards, 3:25.

Top passers

- CAR – Cam Newton – 18/35, 194 yards, TD
- MIN – Teddy Bridgewater – 15/21, 138 yards, 2 TD

Top rushers

- CAR – Jonathan Stewart – 12 rushes, 85 yards
- MIN – Jerick McKinnon – 14 rushes, 52 yards

Top receivers

- CAR – Greg Olsen – 5 receptions, 59 yards
- MIN – Greg Jennings – 5 receptions, 45 yards, TD

==== Week 14: vs. New York Jets ====
Week 14: New York Jets at Minnesota Vikings – Game summary

| Quarter | 1 | 2 | 3 | 4 | OT | Total |
|---|---|---|---|---|---|---|
| Jets | 12 | 3 | 3 | 6 | 0 | 24 |
| Vikings | 14 | 7 | 0 | 3 | 6 | 30 |

at TCF Bank Stadium, Minneapolis, Minnesota

- Date: December 7
- Game time: 12:00 p.m. CST
- Game weather: Cloudy, 32 °F (0 °C)
- Game attendance: 52,152
- Referee: Jerome Boger (23)
- TV announcers (CBS): Spero Dedes and Solomon Wilcots
- Recap, Game Book

Game information

First quarter

- MIN – Gerald Hodges 27-yard interception return (Blair Walsh kick), 14:54. Vikings 7–0.
- NYJ – Sheldon Richardson sack for safety, 10:12. Vikings 7–2.
- NYJ – Percy Harvin 35-yard pass from Geno Smith (Nick Folk kick), 7:35. Jets 9–7. Drive: 5 plays, 65 yards, 2:37.
- MIN – Charles Johnson 56-yard pass from Teddy Bridgewater (Blair Walsh kick), 5:43. Vikings 14–9. Drive: 4 plays, 70 yards, 1:42.
- NYJ – Nick Folk 36-yard field goal, 2:28. Vikings 14–12. Drive: 6 plays, 17 yards, 3:25.

Second quarter

- MIN – Jerome Felton 0-yard fumble recovery (Blair Walsh kick), 13:44. Vikings 21–12. Drive: 7 plays, 58 yards, 3:56.
- NYJ – Nick Folk 33-yard field goal, 0:17. Vikings 21–15. Drive: 12 plays, 50 yards, 3:30.

Third quarter

- NYJ – Nick Folk 22-yard field goal, 12:24. Vikings 21–18. Drive: 6 plays, 22 yards, 2:32.

Fourth quarter

- NYJ – Nick Folk 24-yard field goal, 14:15. Tied 21–21. Drive: 11 plays, 65 yards, 5:48.
- MIN – Blair Walsh 20-yard field goal, 5:28. Vikings 24–21. Drive: 7 plays, 45 yards, 3:12.
- NYJ – Nick Folk 44-yard field goal, 0:23. Tied 24–24. Drive: 9 plays, 45 yards, 2:44.

Overtime

- MIN – Jarius Wright 87-yard pass from Teddy Bridgewater, 10:35. Vikings 30–24. Drive: 3 plays, 92 yards, 1:39.

Top passers

- NYJ – Geno Smith – 18/29, 254 yards, TD
- MIN – Teddy Bridgewater – 19/27, 309 yards, 2 TD

Top rushers

- NYJ – Chris Ivory – 16 rushes, 73 yards
- MIN – Matt Asiata – 19 rushes, 54 yards

Top receivers

- NYJ – Percy Harvin – 6 receptions, 124 yards, TD
- MIN – Jarius Wright – 4 receptions, 123 yards, TD

With the overtime win, the Vikings improve to 6–7 and have therefore improved on last year's record.

==== Week 15: at Detroit Lions ====
Week 15: Minnesota Vikings at Detroit Lions – Game summary

| Quarter | 1 | 2 | 3 | 4 | Total |
|---|---|---|---|---|---|
| Vikings | 7 | 7 | 0 | 0 | 14 |
| Lions | 0 | 10 | 3 | 3 | 16 |

at Ford Field, Detroit, Michigan

- Date: December 14
- Game time: 4:25 p.m. EST/3:25 p.m. CST
- Game weather: None (indoor stadium)
- Game attendance: 62,490
- Referee: Pete Morelli (135)
- TV announcers (Fox): Chris Myers, Ronde Barber and Jennifer Hale
- Recap, Game Book

Game information

First quarter

- MIN – Matt Asiata 2-yard run (Blair Walsh kick), 0:16. Vikings 7–0. Drive: 10 plays, 84 yards, 5:09.

Second quarter

- MIN – Greg Jennings 8-yard pass from Teddy Bridgewater (Blair Walsh kick), 10:05. Vikings 14–0. Drive: 7 plays, 75 yards, 3:53.
- DET – Golden Tate 7-yard pass from Matthew Stafford (Matt Prater kick), 3:42. Vikings 14–7. Drive: 2 plays, 11 yards, 0:45.
- DET – Matt Prater 29-yard field goal, 0:00. Vikings 14–10. Drive: 7 plays, 21 yards, 3:00.

Third quarter

- DET – Matt Prater 30-yard field goal, 3:45. Vikings 14–13. Drive: 13 plays, 74 yards, 7:19.

Fourth quarter

- DET – Matt Prater 33-yard field goal, 3:38. Lions 16–14. Drive: 10 plays, 65 yards, 4:05.

Top passers

- MIN – Teddy Bridgewater – 31/41, 315 yards, TD
- DET – Matthew Stafford – 17/28, 153 yards, TD

Top rushers

- MIN – Matt Asiata – 11 rushes, 36 yards, TD
- DET – Joique Bell – 15 rushes, 62 yards

Top receivers

- MIN – Charles Johnson – 5 receptions, 72 yards
- DET – Calvin Johnson – 6 receptions, 53 yards

The loss resulted in the Vikings being officially eliminated from playoff contention.

==== Week 16: at Miami Dolphins ====
Week 16: Minnesota Vikings at Miami Dolphins – Game summary

| Quarter | 1 | 2 | 3 | 4 | Total |
|---|---|---|---|---|---|
| Vikings | 7 | 10 | 0 | 18 | 35 |
| Dolphins | 0 | 7 | 7 | 23 | 37 |

at Sun Life Stadium, Miami Gardens, Florida

- Date: December 21
- Game time: 1:00 p.m. EST/12:00 p.m. CST
- Game weather: Partly cloudy, 80 °F (27 °C)
- Game attendance: 66,203
- Referee: Tony Corrente (99)
- TV announcers (Fox): Kenny Albert, Daryl Johnston and Tony Siragusa
- Recap, Game Book

Game information

First quarter

- MIN – Matt Asiata 1-yard run (Blair Walsh kick), 4:23. Vikings 7–0. Drive: 10 plays, 54 yards, 5:36.

Second quarter

- MIN – Greg Jennings 21-yard pass from Teddy Bridgewater (Blair Walsh kick), 11:34. Vikings 14–0. Drive: 3 plays, 23 yards, 0:49.
- MIA – Dion Sims 14-yard pass from Ryan Tannehill (Caleb Sturgis kick), 4:53. Vikings 14–7. Drive: 12 plays, 92 yards, 6:41.
- MIN – Blair Walsh 18-yard field goal, 0:02. Vikings 17–7. Drive: 10 plays, 86 yards, 1:04.

Third quarter

- MIA – Mike Wallace 16-yard pass from Ryan Tannehill (Caleb Sturgis kick), 8:29. Vikings 17–14. Drive: 6 plays, 80 yards, 4:03.

Fourth quarter

- MIA – Lamar Miller 1-yard run (Caleb Sturgis kick), 14:57. Dolphins 21–17. Drive: 9 plays, 64 yards, 3:39.
- MIN – Blair Walsh 33-yard field goal, 9:52. Dolphins 21–20. Drive: 9 plays, 64 yards, 5:05.
- MIA – Mike Wallace 7-yard pass from Ryan Tannehill (Caleb Sturgis kick), 6:39. Dolphins 28–20. Drive: 8 plays, 80 yards, 3:13.
- MIN – Jarius Wright 8-yard pass from Teddy Bridgewater (Matt Asiata run), 4:46. Tied 28–28. Drive: 5 plays, 60 yards, 1:53.
- MIN – Matt Asiata 5-yard run (Blair Walsh kick), 4:35. Vikings 35–28. Drive: 1 play, 5 yards, 0:05.
- MIA – Damien Williams 3-yard pass from Ryan Tannehill (Caleb Sturgis kick), 1:11. Tied 35–35. Drive: 11 plays, 80 yards, 3:24.
- MIA – Punt blocked by Terrence Fede out of bounds of end zone for a safety, 0:41. Dolphins 37–35.

Top passers

- MIN – Teddy Bridgewater – 19/26, 259 yards, 2 TD
- MIA – Ryan Tannehill – 35/47, 398 yards, 4 TD

Top rushers

- MIN – Matt Asiata – 16 rushes, 58 yards, 2 TD
- MIA – Lamar Miller – 19 rushes, 92 yards, TD

Top receivers

- MIN – Greg Jennings – 3 receptions, 56 yards, TD
- MIA – Charles Clay – 6 receptions, 114 yards

==== Week 17: vs. Chicago Bears ====
Week 17: Chicago Bears at Minnesota Vikings – Game summary

| Quarter | 1 | 2 | 3 | 4 | Total |
|---|---|---|---|---|---|
| Bears | 0 | 3 | 3 | 3 | 9 |
| Vikings | 3 | 0 | 7 | 3 | 13 |

at TCF Bank Stadium, Minneapolis, Minnesota

- Date: December 28
- Game time: 12:00 p.m. CST
- Game weather: Cloudy, 15 °F (−9 °C)
- Game attendance: 52,364
- Referee: Jeff Triplette (42)
- TV announcers (Fox): Dick Stockton, Brady Quinn and Kristina Pink
- Recap, Game Book

Game information

First quarter

- MIN – Blair Walsh 37-yard field goal, 4:59. Vikings 3–0. Drive: 13 plays, 61 yards, 5:25.

Second quarter

- CHI – Jay Feely 48-yard field goal, 0:55. Tied 3–3. Drive: 9 plays, 42 yards, 2:53.

Third quarter

- CHI – Jay Feely 25-yard field goal, 13:05. Bears 6–3. Drive: 4 plays, 2 yards, 1:40.
- MIN – Adam Thielen 44-yard pass from Teddy Bridgewater (Blair Walsh kick), 10:53. Vikings 10–6. Drive: 6 plays, 80 yards, 2:12.

Fourth quarter

- MIN – Blair Walsh 44-yard field goal, 11:29. Vikings 13–6. Drive: 5 plays, 27 yards, 2:29.
- CHI – Jay Feely 35-yard field goal, 8:53. Vikings 13–9. Drive: 8 plays, 18 yards, 2:36.

Top passers

- CHI – Jay Cutler – 23/36, 172 yards
- MIN – Teddy Bridgewater – 17/25, 209 yards, TD

Top rushers

- CHI – Matt Forté – 17 rushes, 51 yards
- MIN – Matt Asiata – 19 rushes, 91 yards

Top receivers

- CHI – Martellus Bennett – 8 receptions, 59 yards
- MIN – Adam Thielen – 3 receptions, 68 yards, TD

=== Standings ===
==== Division ====
NFC North
| | W | L | T | PCT | DIV | CONF | PF | PA | STK |
|---|---|---|---|---|---|---|---|---|---|
| ^{(2)} Green Bay Packers | 12 | 4 | 0 | .750 | 5–1 | 9–3 | 486 | 348 | W2 |
| ^{(6)} Detroit Lions | 11 | 5 | 0 | .688 | 5–1 | 9–3 | 321 | 282 | L1 |
| Minnesota Vikings | 7 | 9 | 0 | .438 | 1–5 | 6–6 | 325 | 343 | W1 |
| Chicago Bears | 5 | 11 | 0 | .313 | 1–5 | 4–8 | 319 | 442 | L5 |

==== Conference ====
NFC
| # | Team | Division | W | L | T | PCT | DIV | CONF | SOS | SOV | STK |
|---|---|---|---|---|---|---|---|---|---|---|---|
Division leaders
| 1 (Note: Seattle, Green Bay and Dallas were ranked in seeds 1–3 based on conference record.) | Seattle Seahawks | West | 12 | 4 | 0 | .750 | 5–1 | 10–2 | .525 | .513 | W6 |
| 2 | Green Bay Packers | North | 12 | 4 | 0 | .750 | 5–1 | 9–3 | .482 | .440 | W2 |
| 3 | Dallas Cowboys | East | 12 | 4 | 0 | .750 | 4–2 | 8–4 | .445 | .422 | W4 |
| 4 | Carolina Panthers | South | 7 | 8 | 1 | .469 | 4–2 | 6–6 | .490 | .357 | W4 |
Wild Cards
| 5 (Note: Arizona defeated Detroit head-to-head (Week 11, 14–6).) | Arizona Cardinals | West | 11 | 5 | 0 | .688 | 3–3 | 8–4 | .523 | .477 | L2 |
| 6 | Detroit Lions | North | 11 | 5 | 0 | .688 | 5–1 | 9–3 | .471 | .392 | L1 |
Did not qualify for the postseason
| 7 | Philadelphia Eagles | East | 10 | 6 | 0 | .625 | 4–2 | 6–6 | .490 | .416 | W1 |
| 8 | San Francisco 49ers | West | 8 | 8 | 0 | .500 | 2–4 | 7–5 | .527 | .508 | W1 |
| 9 (Note: New Orleans defeated Minnesota head-to-head (Week 3, 20–9).) | New Orleans Saints | South | 7 | 9 | 0 | .438 | 3–3 | 6–6 | .486 | .415 | W1 |
| 10 | Minnesota Vikings | North | 7 | 9 | 0 | .438 | 1–5 | 6–6 | .475 | .308 | W1 |
| 11 (Note: The NY Giants defeated both Atlanta and St. Louis head-to-head (Atlanta: Week 5, 30–20; St. Louis: Week 16, 37–27), while Atlanta finished ahead of St. Louis based on conference record.) | New York Giants | East | 6 | 10 | 0 | .375 | 2–4 | 4–8 | .512 | .323 | L1 |
| 12 | Atlanta Falcons | South | 6 | 10 | 0 | .375 | 5–1 | 6–6 | .482 | .380 | L1 |
| 13 | St. Louis Rams | West | 6 | 10 | 0 | .375 | 2–4 | 4–8 | .531 | .427 | L3 |
| 14 | Chicago Bears | North | 5 | 11 | 0 | .313 | 1–5 | 4–8 | .529 | .338 | L5 |
| 15 | Washington Redskins | East | 4 | 12 | 0 | .250 | 2–4 | 2–10 | .496 | .422 | L1 |
| 16 | Tampa Bay Buccaneers | South | 2 | 14 | 0 | .125 | 0–6 | 1–11 | .486 | .469 | L6 |
Tiebreakers (Note: When breaking ties for three or more teams under the NFL's rules, they are first broken within divisions, then comparing only the highest-ranked remaining team from each division.)

== Statistics ==
=== Team leaders ===
| Category | Player(s) | Value |
|---|---|---|
| Passing yards | Teddy Bridgewater | 2,919 |
| Passing touchdowns | Teddy Bridgewater | 14 |
| Rushing yards | Matt Asiata | 570 |
| Rushing touchdowns | Matt Asiata | 9 |
| Receptions | Greg Jennings | 59 |
| Receiving yards | Greg Jennings | 742 |
| Receiving touchdowns | Greg Jennings | 6 |
| Points | Blair Walsh | 107 |
| Kickoff return yards | Cordarrelle Patterson | 871 |
| Punt return yards | Marcus Sherels | 297 |
| Tackles | Robert Blanton | 106 |
| Sacks | Everson Griffen | 12 |
| Interceptions | Harrison Smith | 5 |
| Forced fumbles | Anthony Barr | 2 |

Source for this section: Minnesota Vikings' official website.

=== League rankings ===
| Category | Total yards | Yards per game | NFL rank (out of 32) |
|---|---|---|---|
| Passing offense | 3,244 | 202.8 | 28th |
| Rushing offense | 1,804 | 112.8 | 14th |
| Total offense | 5,048 | 315.5 | 27th |
| Passing defense | 3,572 | 223.3 | 7th |
| Rushing defense | 1,943 | 121.4 | 25th |
| Total defense | 5,515 | 344.7 | 14th |

Source for this section: NFL.com.
