= 2014 East–West Shrine Game =

- All–Star Bowl Game
| East Team | West Team |
| 23 | 13 |
| Head coach: Jerry Glanville | Head coach: Romeo Crennel |
| | 1 | 2 | 3 | 4 | Total |
|---|---|---|---|---|---|
| East | 3 | 10 | 3 | 7 | 23 |
| West | 3 | 3 | 7 | 0 | 13 |
- Date: January 18, 2014
- Season: 2013
- Stadium: Tropicana Field
- Location: St. Petersburg, Florida
- MVP: Jimmy Garoppolo (QB, Eastern Illinois) & Ethan Westbrooks (DE, West Texas A&M)
- Attendance: 19,500

United States TV coverage
- Network: NFL Network

The 2014 East–West Shrine Game, the 89th staging of the all-star college football exhibition game, was held on January 18, 2014, at 4:00 p.m. EST, and featured NCAA Division I Football Bowl Subdivision players and a few select invitees from Canadian university football. The game featured more than 100 players from the 2013 college football season, and prospects for the 2014 draft of the professional National Football League (NFL). In the week prior to the game, scouts from all 32 NFL teams attended. The game was held in St. Petersburg, Florida, at Tropicana Field, and benefits Shriners Hospitals for Children.

== Players ==
=== East Team ===
==== Offense ====
| No. | Name | Position | Height/Weight | School |
|---|---|---|---|---|
| 24 | Zach Bauman | RB | 5-10/200 | Northern Arizona |
| 82 | Alex Bayer | TE | 6-4/253 | Bowling Green |
| 52 | Justin Britt | OT | 6-6/315 | Missouri |
| 71 | Kyle Bryant | OT | 6-7/320 | Youngstown State |
| 66 | Laurent Duvernay-Tardif | OT | 6-5/315 | McGill (Canada) |
| 74 | Chris Elkins | C | 6-4/300 | Youngstown State |
| 72 | Matt Feiler | OT | 6-7/325 | Bloomsburg |
| 73 | Zach Fulton | OG | 6-5/323 | Tennessee |
| 80 | Jeremy Gallon | WR | 5-8/187 | Michigan |
| 11 | Jimmy Garoppolo | QB | 6-3/222 | Eastern Illinois |
| 8 | Crockett Gillmore | TE | 6-6/245 | Colorado State |
| 76 | Matt Hall | OT | 6-10/320 | Belhaven (MS) |
| 52 | Donald Hawkins | OT | 6-5/310 | Texas |
| 84 | Matt Hazel | WR | 6-3/190 | Coastal Carolina |
| 1 | Allen Hurns | WR | 6-3/195 | Miami (FL) |
| 18 | Blake Jackson | TE | 6-3/235 | Oklahoma State |
| 67 | Zac Kerin | C | 6-5/300 | Toledo |
| 85 | Ja-Mes Logan | WR | 6-3/193 | Mississippi |
| 88 | Erik Lora | WR | 5-11/190 | Eastern Illinois |
| 59 | Antwan Lowery | OG | 6-4/305 | Rutgers |
| 6 | Jordan Lynch | QB | 6-0/216 | Northern Illinois |
| 9 | Jeff Mathews | QB | 6-4/229 | Cornell |
| 20 | Rajion Neal | RB | 5-10/212 | Tennessee |
| 27 | LaDarius Perkins | RB | 5-10/190 | Mississippi State |
| 64 | James Stone | C | 6-3/302 | Tennessee |
| 63 | John Urschel | OG | 6-3/308 | Penn State |

==== Defense ====
| No. | Name | Position | HT/WT | School |
|---|---|---|---|---|
| 21 | Ricardo Allen | CB | 5-9/186 | Purdue |
| 10 | Tre Boston | S | 6-1/190 | North Carolina |
| 13 | Xavius Boyd | LB | 6-2/243 | Western Kentucky |
| 96 | Jason Bromley | DL | 6-4/293 | Syracuse |
| 2 | Preston Brown | LB | 6-2/255 | Louisville |
| 22 | T. J. Carrie | CB | 6-0/212 | Ohio |
| 40 | Glenn Carson | LB | 6-3/235 | Penn State |
| 98 | Will Clarke | DL | 6-7/273 | West Virginia |
| 26 | Ross Cockrell | CB | 6-0/190 | Duke |
| 3 | Pierre Desir | CB | 6-2/210 | Lindenwood |
| 15 | Phillip Gaines | CB | 6-1/185 | Rice |
| 90 | Bruce Gaston | DL | 6-2/305 | Purdue |
| 23 | Andre Hal | CB | 6-0/185 | Vanderbilt |
| 4 | Andrew Jackson | LB | 6-1/257 | Western Kentucky |
| 46 | Derrell Johnson | LB | 6-2/263 | East Carolina |
| 94 | Zach Kerr | DL | 6-2/310 | Delaware |
| 34 | DeDe Lattimore | LB | 6-1/237 | South Florida |
| 5 | Nevin Lawson | CB | 5-10/186 | Utah State |
| 17 | A. J. Marshall | S | 6-0/190 | Wake Forest |
| 26 | Demonte McAllister | DL | 6-2/290 | Florida State |
| 41 | Johnny Millard | LB | 6-3/240 | Cal Poly |
| 53 | Cody Peterson | LB | 6-3/228 | Navy |
| 56 | Garrison Smith | DL | 6-3/297 | Georgia |
| 29 | Hakeem Smith | S | 6-2/199 | Louisville |
| 12 | Dezmen Southward | S | 6-2/214 | Wisconsin |
| 14 | Jemea Thomas | S | 5-10/195 | Georgia Tech |
| 99 | Ethan Westbrooks | DL | 6-4/263 | West Texas A&M |
| 57 | Kerry Wynn | DL | 6-5/270 | Richmond |

==== Specialists ====
| No. | Name | Position | HT/WT | School |
|---|---|---|---|---|
| 16 | Zach Hocker | K | 6-0/182 | Arkansas |
| 30 | Steven Clark | P | 6-5/232 | Auburn |

=== West Team ===
==== Offense ====
| No. | Name | Position | Height/Weight | School |
|---|---|---|---|---|
| 83 | Ted Bolser | TE | 6-6/255 | Indiana |
| 2 | John Brown | WR | 5-11/170 | Pitt State (KS) |
| 68 | Chris Burnette | OG | 6-2/312 | Georgia |
| 24 | Brennan Clay | RB | 5-11/198 | Oklahoma |
| 79 | Dakota Dozier | OG | 6-4/291 | Furman |
| 18 | Quincy Enunwa | WR | 6-2/225 | Nebraska |
| 63 | Dillon Farrell | OG | 6-5/290 | New Mexico |
| 20 | Timothy Flanders | RB | 5-9/210 | Sam Houston State |
| 82 | Kaneakua Friel | TE | 6-5/250 | BYU |
| 77 | Kevin Graf | OT | 6-6/304 | USC |
| 75 | Ryan Groy | OG | 6-5/320 | Wisconsin |
| 64 | Gabe Ikard | C | 6-3/290 | Oklahoma |
| 89 | Chandler Jones | WR | 5-11/175 | San Jose State |
| 81 | Seantavius Jones | WR | 6-3/200 | Valdosta State |
| 7 | T. J. Jones | WR | 5-11/190 | Notre Dame |
| 76 | Danny Kistler | OT | 6-8/315 | Montana |
| 37 | Anthony LaCoste | RB | 5-10/205 | Air Force |
| 18 | Patrick Laird | WR | 6-3/219 | Army |
| 78 | Charles Leno | OT | 6-4/295 | Boise State |
| 31 | Ben Malena | RB | 5-9/195 | Texas A&M |
| 48 | Jordan Najvar | TE | 6-6/255 | Baylor |
| 17 | Keith Price | QB | 6-1/202 | Washington |
| 6 | Bernard Reedy | WR | 5-9/175 | Toledo |
| 11 | Tommy Rees | QB | 6-1/215 | Notre Dame |
| 71 | Jeremiah Sirles | OT | 6-6/312 | Nebraska |
| 10 | Keith Wenning | QB | 6-3/220 | Ball State |
| 72 | Austin Wentworth | OG | 6-5/300 | Fresno State |
| 58 | Khalil Wilkes | C | 6-3/290 | Stanford |

==== Defense ====
| No. | Name | Position | HT/WT | School |
|---|---|---|---|---|
| 97 | Beau Allen | DL | 6-3/334 | Wisconsin |
| 56 | Shaquil Barrett | LB | 6-2/250 | Colorado State |
| 22 | Bené Benwikere | CB | 6-0/192 | San Jose State |
| 44 | Max Bullough | LB | 6-3/245 | Michigan State |
| 23 | Carrington Byndom | CB | 6-0/180 | Texas |
| 3 | Alden Darby | S | 5-11/195 | Arizona State |
| 40 | Nate Dreiling | LB | 6-4/226 | Pitt State (KS) |
| 70 | Justin Ellis | DL | 6-2/357 | Louisiana Tech |
| 32 | E. J. Gaines | CB | 5-11/195 | Missouri |
| 95 | Evan Gill | DL | 6-3/291 | Manitoba (Canada) |
| 98 | Derrick Hopkins | DL | 6-0/311 | Virginia Tech |
| 12 | Bennett Jackson | CB | 6-0/195 | Notre Dame |
| 42 | Devon Kennard | LB | 6-3/255 | USC |
| 8 | Daytawion Lowe | S | 5-11/205 | Oklahoma State |
| 93 | Cassius Marsh | DL | 6-4/268 | UCLA |
| 90 | Josh Mauro | DL | 6-6/275 | Stanford |
| 92 | Zach Moore | DL | 6-6/285 | Concordia (MN) |
| 27 | Stephen Obeng-Agyapong | S | 5-10/205 | Penn State |
| 1 | Sean Parker | S | 5-10/195 | Washington |
| 16 | Rashaad Reynolds | CB | 5-11/186 | Oregon State |
| 5 | Shaquille Richardson | CB | 6-1/188 | Arizona |
| 55 | Prince Shembo | LB | 6-1/250 | Notre Dame |
| 9 | Daniel Sorensen | S | 6-2/208 | BYU |
| 41 | Tyler Starr | LB | 6-5/250 | South Dakota |
| 96 | Chidera Uzo-Diribe | DL | 6-3/250 | Colorado |
| 21 | Brock Vereen | S | 6-0/202 | Minnesota |
| 99 | Larry Webster III | DL | 6-7/250 | Bloomsburg |
| 25 | Marcus Williams | CB | 5-11/192 | North Dakota State |

==== Specialists ====
| No. | Name | Position | HT/WT | School |
|---|---|---|---|---|
| 4 | Anthony Fera | K | 6-2/208 | Texas |
| 15 | Richie Leone | P | 6-3/215 | Houston |

== Game summary ==
=== Scoring summary ===
Scoring summary

| Quarter | Time | Drive | | | Team | Scoring information | Score | |
| Quarter | Time | Plays | Yards | TOP | Team | Scoring information | East | West |
|---|---|---|---|---|---|---|---|---|
| 1 | 13:17 | 4 | 9 | 1:04 | East | 31-yard field goal by Zach Hocker | 3 | 0 |
| 1 | 6:47 | 12 | 61 | 6:19 | West | 34-yard field goal by Anthony Fera | 3 | 3 |
| 2 | 14:17 | 5 | 8 | 2:36 | West | 37-yard field goal by Anthony Fera | 3 | 6 |
| 2 | 2:45 | 9 | 48 | 3:46 | East | 34-yard field goal by Zach Hocker | 6 | 6 |
| 2 | 0:12 | 7 | 66 | 0:47 | East | Matt Hazel 1-yard touchdown run, Zach Hocker kick good | 13 | 6 |
| 3 | 9:24 | 5 | 49 | 3:12 | West | Bernard Reedy 20-yard touchdown reception from Keith Price, Anthony Fera kick good | 13 | 13 |
| 4 | 11:16 | 7 | 30 | 4:11 | East | 57-yard field goal by Zach Hocker | 16 | 13 |
| 4 | 9:38 | | | | East | Fumble recovery returned 0 yards for touchdown by Nevin Lawson, Zach Hocker kick good | 23 | 13 |
| "TOP" = time of possession. For other American football terms, see Glossary of American football. | | | | | | | 23 | 13 |

=== Statistics ===
| Statistics | East | West |
|---|---|---|
| First downs | 11 | 15 |
| Total offense, plays - yards | 52-225 | 62-240 |
| Rushes-yards (net) | 23-85 | 25-61 |
| Passing yards (net) | 140 | 179 |
| Passes, Comp-Att-Int | 15-26-3 | 19-36-2 |
| Time of Possession | 26:45 | 33:15 |
