= Antonio Richardson =

American football player (born 1992)

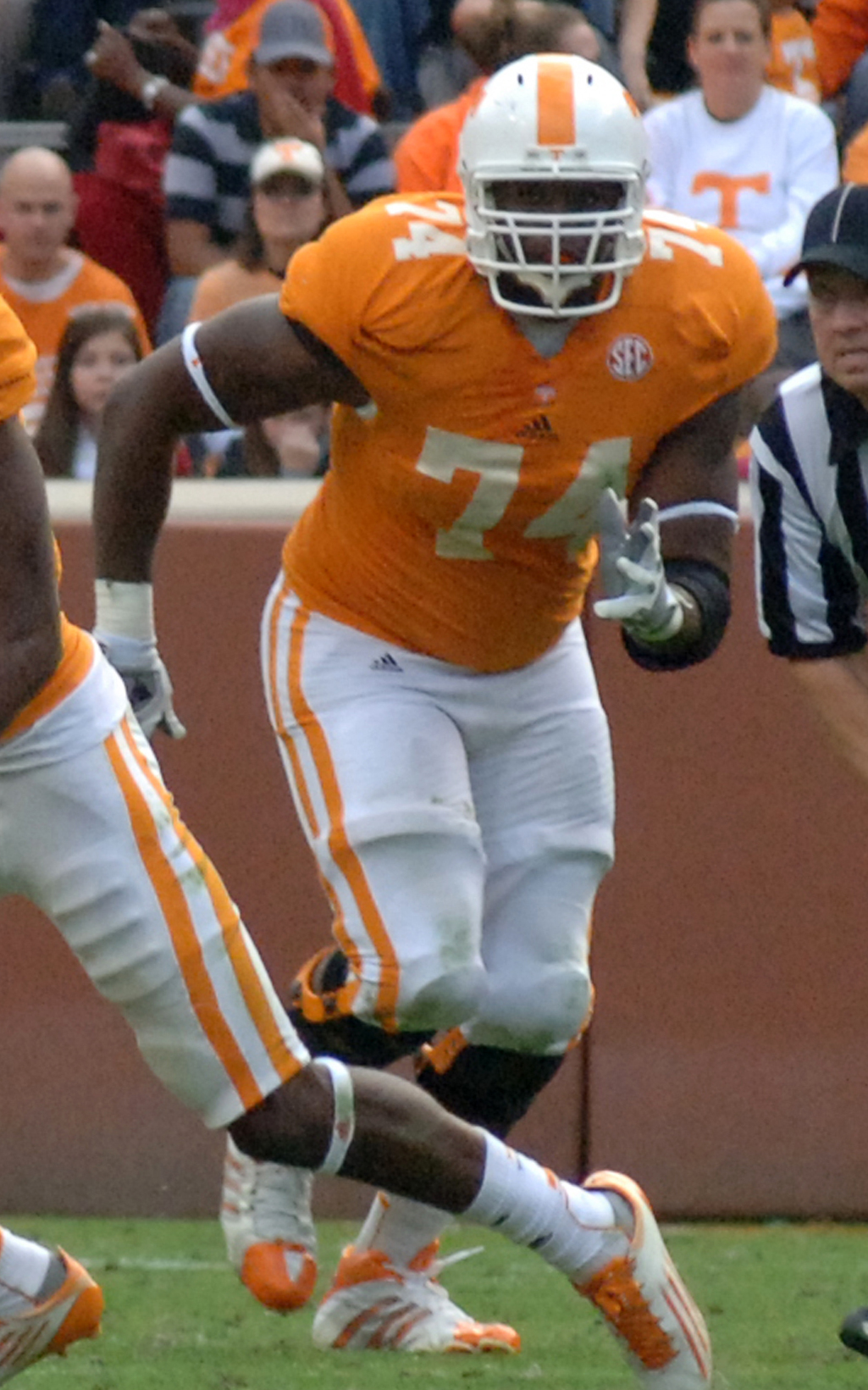
- Richardson with Tennessee in 2012

No. 78
- Position: Offensive tackle

Personal information
- Born: February 24, 1992 (age 34); Mt. Pleasant, Tennessee
- Listed height: 6 ft 6 in (1.98 m)
- Listed weight: 336 lb (152 kg)

Career information
- High school: Nashville (TN) Pearl Cohn
- College: Tennessee
- NFL draft: 2014: undrafted

Career history
- Minnesota Vikings (2014)

Awards and highlights
- Second-team All-SEC (2012, 2013)
- Stats at Pro Football Reference

Antonio James "Tiny" Richardson (born February 24, 1992) is an American former football offensive tackle for the Minnesota Vikings of the National Football League (NFL). He played college football at Tennessee.

== Early life ==
Richardson spent most of his childhood in Mount Pleasant, Tennessee, before moving to Nashville when he was 15. He played high school football and competed in track at Ensworth, a Nashville private school, from 2008 to 2010. During his junior year in 2009, he led an offensive line that did not give up any sacks. Midway through his senior season in 2010, Richardson transferred to Nashville's Pearl-Cohn High School for academic reasons. Due to TSSAA rules, he was ineligible to play for Pearl-Cohn. During his career at Ensworth, Richardson registered 60 pancake blocks.

In track & field, Richardson was one of the state's top performers in the throwing events. At the 2010 Scott Hartman Meet, he placed 4th in the shot put, with a throw of 15.06 meters. He won the discus throw event at the 2010 TSSAA D-II Middle Sectional Championships, recording a top-throw of 49.26 meters.

In spite of missing part of his senior year, Richardson was a consensus four-star prospect. He was rated by Rivals as the top overall prospect in Tennessee, and the seventh-best offensive tackle in the nation. He played in the 2011 U.S. Army All-American Bowl.

== College career ==
Richardson committed to play at Tennessee on February 2, 2011, one of the Vols' highest-rated recruits that year. He played in 12 games as a backup during his freshman year in 2011, including a few snaps as an extra fullback in Tennessee's games against Vanderbilt and Kentucky. As a sophomore in 2012 he started all 12 games at left tackle. He was widely praised for his performance against All-American defensive end Jadeveon Clowney in Tennessee's 38–35 loss to South Carolina. Richardson largely contained Clowney until late in the game, when Clowney managed to elude him and force a game-saving fumble. Richardson was named to the All-SEC Second Team by the Associated Press at the end of the season.

At the start of his junior campaign in 2013, Richardson was named to the Coaches' Preseason All-SEC team, and was placed on the Outland Trophy watch list. He started in all twelve games for the Vols in the 2013 season, helping the Vols' backfield accumulate 2,261 rushing yards, the most for the school since 2004. He was again named second-team All-SEC at the end of the season.

On December 6, 2013, Richardson announced that he would forgo his senior season and enter the 2014 NFL draft.

== Professional career ==
Prior to the NFL combine, Richardson was thought of possibly being a late first or early second round pick, but the majority of NFL draft experts and scouts gave him a second or third round projection. Richardson was one of four Tennessee offensive linemen to attend the NFL Scouting Combine in Indianapolis, Indiana, along with Zach Fulton, James Stone, and Ja'Wuan James. While running drills, NFL draft analyst Charles Davis stated, "Something doesn’t look right, he doesn’t look totally healthy." This was a cause for concern and Richardson plummeted down draft boards. Davis later commented, "I wasn’t trying to denigrate the kid. He just didn’t look right." and stated he received no pleasure in being right. His combine performance was panned by critics who deemed him to be too slow and many speculated past knee injury remained an ongoing issue. Although injury rumors persisted, Richardson only gave up two sacks during his junior season, started all 12 games at left tackle in the SEC, and was a year removed from his knee surgery. NFL analyst Daniel Jeremiah stated Richardson's junior year film carried the grade of a fifth round prospect and he had issues with run blocking. On April 2, 2014, he attended Tennessee's pro day, along with Zach Fulton, Ja'Wuan James, James Stone, Daniel McCullers, Jacques Smith, Rajion Neal, Michael Palardy, and seven other prospects. He opted to stand on his combine numbers and only performed positional drills for scouts and representatives from all 32 NFL Teams, that included Seattle Seahawks' offensive line coach Tom Cable. At the conclusion of the pre-draft process, Richardson was projected as a second to third round pick by draft experts and scouts. He was ranked the eighth best offensive tackle prospect in the draft by NFLDraftScout.com.

Pre-draft measurables
Height	Weight	Arm length	Hand span	40-yard dash	10-yard split	20-yard shuttle	Three-cone drill	Vertical jump	Broad jump	Bench press
6 ft 6 in (1.98 m)	336 lb (152 kg)	35 in (0.89 m)	10 1/4 in (0.26 m)	5.30 s	1.81 s	5.06 s	8.02 s	31 in (0.79 m)	9 ft 4 in (2.84 m)	36 reps
20-ss, 3-cone, Broad and Vert Jump from Tennessee Pro Day; All other values from NFL Combine

Due to continued rumors about health concerns, Richardson ended up going undrafted in the 2014 NFL draft. On May 10, 2014, the Minnesota Vikings signed Richardson to a three-year, $1.54 million contract with a signing bonus of $10,000. He stated he went undrafted due to teams determining he was too much of a risk with past knee problems.

Throughout training camp, Richardson competed for a roster spot against Phil Loadholt, Mike Remmers, Kevin Murphy, Matt Hall, and Austin Wentworth. Head coach Mike Zimmer stated Richardson was doing a pretty good job at right tackle. Offensive tackle Phil Loadholt mentored Richardson throughout OTA's and camp.

During the preseason, the Minnesota Vikings placed Richardson on injured reserve after it was determined he would have to undergo surgery on both of his knees. On May 7, 2015, the Minnesota Vikings waived Richardson prior to the beginning of fall camp. On May 13, 2015, Richardson officially announced his retirement from professional football.
