= Antone Exum =

American football player and musician (born 1991)

- Exum with the San Francisco 49ers in 2018

No. 32, 40, 38
- Position: Safety

Personal information
- Born: February 27, 1991 (age 35); Richmond, Virginia, U.S.
- Listed height: 6 ft 0 in (1.83 m)
- Listed weight: 219 lb (99 kg)

Career information
- High school: Deep Run (Glen Allen, Virginia)
- College: Virginia Tech
- NFL draft: 2014: 6th round, 182nd overall pick

Career history
- Minnesota Vikings (2014–2017); San Francisco 49ers (2017–2019)

Awards and highlights
- Second-team All-ACC (2012)

Career NFL statistics
- Total tackles: 64
- Forced fumbles: 2
- Fumble recoveries: 3
- Pass deflections: 7
- Interceptions: 1
- Defensive touchdowns: 1
- Stats at Pro Football Reference

Antone Chavez Exum Jr. (born February 27, 1991), also known mononymously as Exum, is an American musician and former professional football safety. He played college football at Virginia Tech, and was selected by the Minnesota Vikings in the sixth round of the 2014 NFL draft.

== Early life ==
Exum attended Deep Run High School in Glen Allen, Virginia, where he participated in football, basketball and track. In 2008, he was named first-team All-region and was a first-team selection for the Richmond Times-Dispatch All-Metro defensive team. As a junior, he threw for 860 yards and rushed for 658 yards, scoring 25 total touchdowns, while also adding 20 tackles and three interceptions as a defensive back. He accounted for 2,357 all-purpose yards and 30 total touchdowns in his senior season, including six on returns.

He also lettered in basketball and track at Deep Run. In 2009, he earned first-place finishes in both the 100 meters (11.50s) and 200 meters (23.53s) at the Douglas Freeman Meet. He also posted a personal-best time of 23.16 seconds in the 200-meter dash at the district meet, where he placed sixth.

Considered a three-star recruit by Rivals.com, Exum was listed as the 38th best athlete prospect of his class and the No. 14 player in the state. He was rated the No. 16 prospect in Virginia by The Roanoke Times. He was rated the No. 42 athlete prospect nationally by both ESPN.com and Scouts Inc. He was also ranked the No. 69 quarterback prospect in the nation by Scout.com.

== College career ==
Exum attended Virginia Tech from 2009 to 2013. In 2009, he redshirted as a true freshman. In 2010, Exum played in all 14 games, starting five. He played at free safety, but moved around a lot in the Hokies nickel defense. He recorded 45 tackles and had a team-high nine pass breakups for the season. In 2011, he was an honorable mention All-ACC selection at safety, after he led the team with 89 tackles, while adding five tackles for loss, 1.5 sacks and an interception. He also had 10 pass breakups, two quarterback hurries, two forced fumbles and a fumble recovery. In 2012, Exum was moved to cornerback in spring practice. He started all 13 games, recording 48 tackles, including 1.5 for loss and led the team with five interceptions. He also had 16 pass break-ups, 21 passes defended, two forced fumbles and a fumble recovery. He capped off his season with an MVP performance in the 2012 Russell Athletic Bowl vs Rutgers, and was also named second-team All-ACC.

In January 2013, Exum suffered a torn ACL and lateral meniscus of his right knee during a pick-up basketball game. Before his injury, he was widely considered to be one of the best shutdown players of the season. Especially considering he had 5 interceptions and 16 pass break-ups, and 21 passes defended in his first year at the cornerback position. He missed the team's spring practice and fall camp due to the injury, but was cleared to play on October 1 by surgeon Dr. James Andrews, just under nine months after his initial diagnosis. Despite being cleared to play, Exum opted not to dress the next two games, but returned to start the next three games before spraining his ankle which caused him to miss the rest of the season, including the Sun Bowl vs. UCLA. Exum and his highly touted NFL prospect teammate, Kyle Fuller, also missed the Sun Bowl.

== Professional career ==
Pre-draft measurables
Height	Weight	Arm length	Hand span	40-yard dash	10-yard split	20-yard split	20-yard shuttle	Three-cone drill	Vertical jump	Broad jump	Bench press
6 ft 0 in (1.83 m)	213 lb (97 kg)	33 1/2 in (0.85 m)	9 3/8 in (0.24 m)	4.58 s	1.58 s	2.68 s	4.13 s	7.01 s	35 in (0.89 m)	9 ft 11 in (3.02 m)	17 reps
All values from NFL Combine and Pro Day

=== Minnesota Vikings ===
==== 2014 season ====
After trading down twice from 148th and 168th, the Minnesota Vikings selected Exum in the sixth round (182nd overall) of the 2014 NFL draft. Many analysts stated that, had he stayed healthy all year, he most likely would have been a 1st–2nd round pick. Exum became the first safety drafted by the Vikings since the club selected Harrison Smith 29th overall in the 2012 NFL draft. He was also the highest selected defensive back of the 3 picked by the Vikings in the 2014 NFL draft.

Exum played in 15 games (the 2nd most by a Vikings rookie behind DT Shamar Stephen) with no starts during his rookie campaign, contributing heavily on special teams. He was tied for 5th on the team with 7 special teams tackles, compiling 3 of them in the final 4 games of the season. He finished the season with 6 tackles (4 solo).

==== 2015 season ====
Exum was one of just two Vikings defenders to play every snap (64) in the 20–10 win over the Atlanta Falcons in Week 12, and he had a strong day in his first career start (Harrison Smith was inactive with a knee injury) as the Vikings contained wide receiver Julio Jones and the Falcons' fifth-ranked pass offense. Exum gave up only 16 yards in two passes targeted for him, knifed in to stop Tevin Coleman for a four-yard loss at the goal line and recovered Anthony Barr's forced fumble on Coleman's 46-yard run. Exum ended the game with three tackles (one for loss) and a fumble recovery. In Minnesota's Week 13 loss against the Seattle Seahawks Exum tackled Seahawks running back Thomas Rawls to force his first career fumble in the NFL.

==== 2016 season ====
Exum was waived/injured by the Vikings on August 30, 2016. He was then placed on injured reserve after clearing waivers.

==== 2017 season ====
After an injury in mini-camp, Exum went into the 2017 training camp healthy, and spent the first week of practice as a nickel corner after spending his first few seasons as a safety. He was waived by the Vikings on September 16, 2017.

=== San Francisco 49ers ===
On November 7, 2017, Exum signed with the San Francisco 49ers.

On June 6, 2018, Exum re-signed with the 49ers. He was released on September 1, 2018, and was re-signed again on September 3, 2018. In Week 4 against Philip Rivers and the Los Angeles Chargers, Exum recorded his first career interception and touchdown.

On March 14, 2019, Exum re-signed with the 49ers.

On August 31, 2019, Exum was released but re-signed the next day. He was released on October 2, 2019. He was re-signed on December 4, 2019. On January 1, 2020, Exum was waived by the 49ers.

== Career statistics ==
=== NFL ===
Regular season statistics				Tackles					Interceptions						Fumbles		
Season	Team	GP	GS	Comb	Total	Ast	Sck	Sfty	PDef	Int	Yds	Avg	Lng	TDs	FF	FR	FR YDS
2014	MIN	15	0	6	4	2	0.0	--	0	0	0	0.0	0	0	0	0	0
2015	MIN	12	2	13	12	1	0.0	--	0	0	0	0.0	0	0	1	1	0
2016	MIN	0	0	did not play due to injury													
2017	SF	2	1	3	2	1	0.0	--	0	0	0	0	0	0	0	0	0
2018	SF	15	7	40	34	6	1.0	--	3	1	32	32.0	32T	1	1	0	0
2019	SF	7	0	2	1	1	0.0	--	0	0	0	0.0	0	0	0	0	0
Career		51	12	64	53	11	1.0	0	7	1	32	32.0	32T	1	2	1	0

=== College ===
Regular season statistics				Tackles					Interceptions						Fumbles		
Season	Team	GP	GS	Comb	Total	Ast	Sck	Sfty	PDef	Int	Yds	Avg	Lng	TDs	FF	FR	FR YDS
2010	Virginia Tech	14	5	45	28	17	0.0	--	9	0	0	0.0	0	0	1	0	0
2011	Virginia Tech	14	14	89	43	46	1.5	--	11	1	36	36.0	36	0	2	1	0
2012	Virginia Tech	13	13	48	35	13	0.0	--	21	5	44	8.8	32	0	2	1	0
2013	Virginia Tech	3	3	4	4	0	0.0	--	1	0	0	0.0	0	0	0	0	0
Totals		44	35	186	110	76	1.5	0	42	6	80	13.3	36	0	5	2	0

== Music career ==
After an injury ended his 2016 season with the Minnesota Vikings, Exum started recording songs. He began collaborating with Norwegian producer Erik Samkopf in 2018. Exum's music is described as "surreal pop" by The Guardian.

His track Arrest The Dancer debuted on the Matt Wilkinson Show on May 6, 2021.
