= Robert Blanton =

American football player (born 1989)

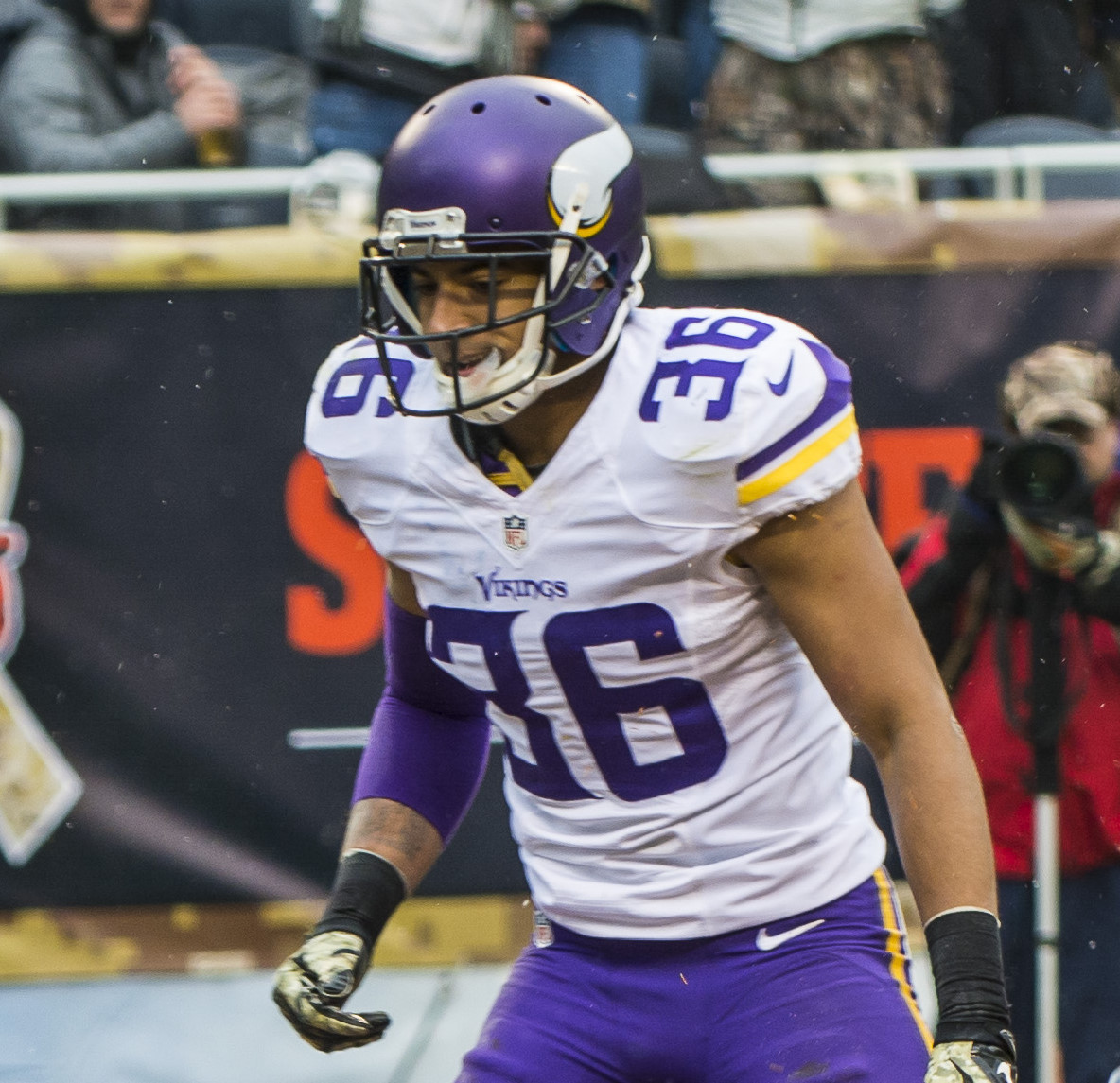
- Blanton with the Minnesota Vikings in 2014

New Orleans Saints
- Title: Defensive assistant

Personal information
- Born: September 7, 1989 (age 37); Clackamas, Oregon, U.S.
- Listed height: 6 ft 1 in (1.85 m)
- Listed weight: 200 lb (91 kg)

Career information
- Position: Safety (No. 36, 26, 29)
- High school: David W. Butler (Matthews, North Carolina)
- College: Notre Dame (2008–2011)
- NFL draft: 2012: 5th round, 139th overall pick

Career history

Playing
- Minnesota Vikings (2012–2015); Buffalo Bills (2016); Dallas Cowboys (2017)*; Buffalo Bills (2017)
- * Offseason or practice squad member only

Coaching
- Miami (OH) (2022–2024) Safeties coach & Pass game coordinator; New Orleans Saints (2025–present) Assistant defensive backs coach

Career NFL statistics
- Total tackles: 252
- Fumble recoveries: 1
- Pass deflections: 5
- Interceptions: 1
- Stats at Pro Football Reference

Robert Jack Blanton (born September 7, 1989) is an American former professional football safety and coach who currently serves as a defensive assistant for the New Orleans Saints of the National Football League (NFL). He played college football for the Notre Dame Fighting Irish and was selected by the Minnesota Vikings in the fifth round of the 2012 NFL draft.

== Early life ==
Born in Clackamas Oregon, Blanton attended David W. Butler High School in Matthews, North Carolina. He was named second-team All-state as a sophomore after recording 126 tackles, six interceptions, 10 pass breakups, causing six fumbles and blocking six kicks. He was one of 11 players from the state of North Carolina selected to the All-Southern team by The Orlando Sentinel. He was named to the Super Southern 100 list by The Atlanta Journal-Constitution as one of 10 cornerbacks. As a junior, he totaled 147 tackles, 12 pass breakups and seven interceptions in 15 games played. He also caught four passes for 86 yards. He was named first-team All-state in 2006 and 2007 by the Associated Press. As senior in 2007, he tallied 94 tackles, five interceptions and blocked six kicks, helping the Bulldogs reach the second round of Class 4AA playoffs and earning Defensive Player of the Year honors by The Charlotte Observer. He was one of five finalists for the Glenn Davis Award, a national award based on community service, academics and athletic accomplishment. He was selected for the 2008 U.S. Army All-American Bowl in San Antonio, Texas, where he played both cornerback and safety. He also played in the Shrine Bowl of the Carolinas.

Blanton also participated in basketball and track & field at Butler. He ran hurdles and was a jumper, surpassing 6.40 meters (21 feet) in the long jump and clearing 2.01 meters (6 feet, 7 inches) in the high jump. As a senior in 2008, he recorded a personal-best time of 7.62 seconds in the 55m hurdles. At the NCHSAA 4A State Meet, he placed 4th in the 110m hurdles with a time of 14.47 seconds and 7th in the 300m hurdles with a time of 38.73 seconds.

Considered a four-star recruit by Rivals.com, Blanton was rated as the top cover safety in nation, the 22nd best safety in the country and the seventh-best prospect in the state of North Carolina. He was also rated as the 15th-best cornerback in the country and the third-best player in his state by Scout.com.

== College career ==
Blanton attended the University of Notre Dame between 2008 and 2011. Playing in 50 games, 26 in which he started, he amassed a total of 194 tackles, including 19.5 for loss, 2.5 sacks, 23 pass deflections, and eight interceptions, returning one for a touchdown.

== Professional career ==
Pre-draft measurables
Height	Weight	Arm length	Hand span	Wingspan	40-yard dash	10-yard split	20-yard split	20-yard shuttle	Three-cone drill	Vertical jump	Broad jump	Bench press
6 ft 0 3/4 in (1.85 m)	208 lb (94 kg)	31 1/4 in (0.79 m)	9 1/8 in (0.23 m)	6 ft 4 1/8 in (1.93 m)	4.52 s	1.55 s	2.53 s	3.97 s	6.71 s	34 in (0.86 m)	9 ft 8 in (2.95 m)	12 reps
All values from NFL Combine and Pro Day

=== Minnesota Vikings ===
Blanton was selected by the Minnesota Vikings with the fourth pick of the fifth round (139th overall) of the 2012 NFL draft. On May 22, 2012, Blanton signed with the Vikings.

In 2014, Blanton had the best season of his career, leading the team in tackles with 106, while also forcing one fumble and intercepting one pass, as well as recording 3 pass deflections.

In 2015, Blanton looked to compete with Antone Exum and Andrew Sendejo for the starting job at strong safety.

=== Buffalo Bills ===
On March 18, 2016, Blanton signed a one-year contract with the Buffalo Bills worth $840,000 with $80,000 guaranteed. He suffered a foot injury in Week 11 and was placed on injured reserve on November 26.

=== Dallas Cowboys ===
On April 20, 2017, Blanton signed with the Dallas Cowboys. He was released by the Cowboys on September 2.

=== Buffalo Bills (second stint) ===
On September 20, 2017, Blanton signed with the Bills. He was released by the team on October 3.

== Coaching career ==
On March 3, 2025, the New Orleans Saints hired Blanton to serve as a defensive assistant.

== Personal life ==
At Butler, Blanton was recognized as Carolina Panthers Community Captain for his outstanding performance in classroom and in community. He was a member of Butler honor roll and a first lieutenant in Butler's JROTC program, receiving an JROTC Scholastic Award. He served as a coach for an 11-12-year-old football team at Youth Football Club of Mint Hill. He was spokesperson for Butler High's D.R.E.A.M. Team (Daring to Role-model Excellence as Athletic Mentors) and was one of only 12 hand-selected members.
