= Shamar Stephen =

American football player (born 1991)

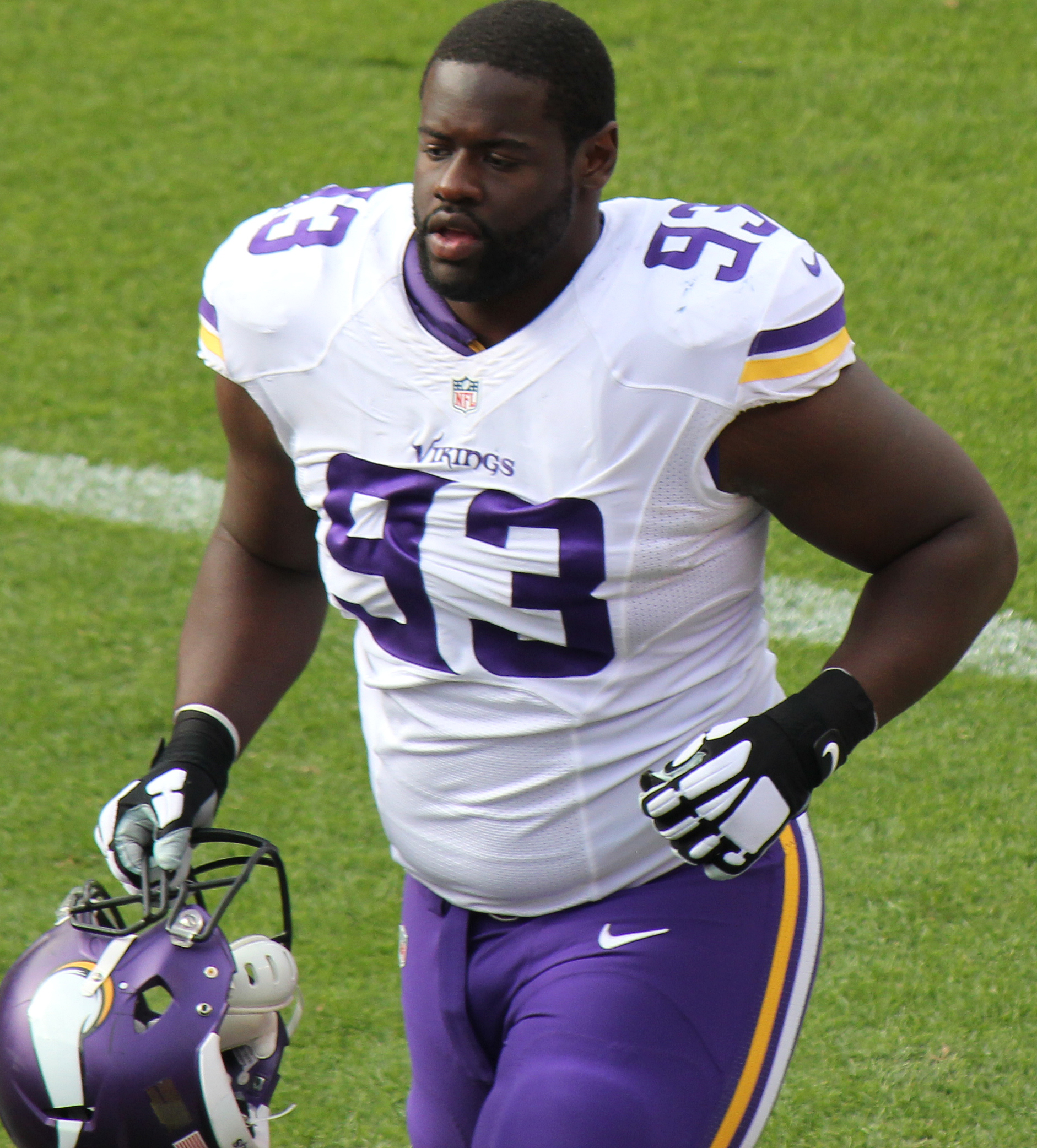
- Stephen with the Minnesota Vikings in 2015

No. 93, 98, 99
- Position: Defensive end

Personal information
- Born: February 25, 1991 (age 35); Brookville, New York, U.S.
- Listed height: 6 ft 5 in (1.96 m)
- Listed weight: 309 lb (140 kg)

Career information
- High school: Long Island Lutheran (Brookville)
- College: UConn
- NFL draft: 2014: 7th round, 220th overall pick

Career history
- Minnesota Vikings (2014–2017); Seattle Seahawks (2018); Minnesota Vikings (2019–2020); Denver Broncos (2021)

Awards and highlights
- Second-team All-AAC (2013)

Career NFL statistics
- Total tackles: 207
- Sacks: 4.5
- Forced fumbles: 1
- Fumble recoveries: 3
- Stats at Pro Football Reference

Shamar Irvin Stephen (/ˈstɛfən/ STEF-ən; born February 25, 1991) is an American former professional football player who was a defensive end in the National Football League (NFL). He played college football for the UConn Huskies. He was selected by the Minnesota Vikings in the seventh round of the 2014 NFL draft. He also played for the Seattle Seahawks and Denver Broncos.

== Early life ==
Stephen attended Long Island Lutheran Middle and High School in Brookville, New York, where he was a two-sport standout playing football and basketball. As a sophomore, he played both on defense and offense and compiled 9 tackles and a sack while also rushing for 91 yards on 18 carries (5.1 avg.) and a touchdown. As a junior, he started every game at defensive tackle and recorded 41 tackles and 7 sacks. While serving as the team captain in his senior season, he earned All-American Lutheran Team honors after finishing his final prep year with 57 tackles and 12.0 sacks along with 2 blocked kicks, helping lead the Crusaders to a 7–2 record. In basketball, he was teammates with current Detroit Pistons player Tobias Harris as a sophomore.

== College career ==
Stephen played college football for the Connecticut Huskies from 2009 to 2013, where he was named a team captain prior to his senior season and also winning team MVP following the season. He was selected to the All-American Athletic Conference Second Team also in his senior season. Stephen was selected and participated in the 2014 Senior Bowl following the season at Connecticut.

== Professional career ==
Pre-draft measurables
Height	Weight	Arm length	Hand span	40-yard dash	10-yard split	20-yard split	20-yard shuttle	Three-cone drill	Vertical jump	Broad jump	Bench press
6 ft 4 7/8 in (1.95 m)	309 lb (140 kg)	33 1/8 in (0.84 m)	10 in (0.25 m)	5.25 s	1.83 s	3.02 s	4.89 s	7.81 s	30.5 in (0.77 m)	8 ft 7 in (2.62 m)	25 reps
All values from NFL Combine and Pro Day

=== Minnesota Vikings ===
==== 2014 season ====
Stephen was selected by the Minnesota Vikings in the seventh round (220th overall pick) of the 2014 NFL draft, becoming the first player from the University of Connecticut drafted by the team since running back Vince Clements in 1971.

Stephen enjoyed a solid rookie season, with only first-round linebacker Anthony Barr being more productive among Vikings' rookie defenders. In the preseason, he received first-team snaps at nose tackle and lined up in both the nose and three-technique spots. He played 42 snaps against the Arizona Cardinals in Week 2, getting the second-most playing time of any Vikings defender. Stephen played in all 16 regular season games, the only Vikings rookie to do so, and started three times. He made his professional debut in the Vikings' season opener against the St. Louis Rams on September 7, 2014, notching two total tackles. He started his second career game against the Panthers in Week 13 and notched a career-best 10 tackles, with five solo stops. In the loss at Miami in Week 16, he had a season-high four quarterback hurries. On November 23, he made his first career start against the Green Bay Packers, replacing Sharrif Floyd at defensive tackle and matching his then career-best with four tackles in the game.

==== 2015 season ====
In his second season, Stephen played in the first five games of the season for the Vikings. In Week 2, he recovered his first career fumble against the Detroit Lions after he fell on a Theo Riddick fumble forced by safety Harrison Smith. The following week, he had season-highs in defensive snaps with 20 and tackles with two against the San Diego Chargers.

On October 18, 2015, Stephen suffered a season-ending toe injury against the Kansas City Chiefs in Week 6 and was carted off the field. The Vikings would go on to place him on injured reserve on October 20, 2015.

==== 2016–2017 seasons ====
In 2016, Stephen started all 16 games, recording a career-high 39 tackles.

In 2017, Stephen was moved to a reserve role, starting only one game in 15 games played, recording 28 tackles.

=== Seattle Seahawks ===
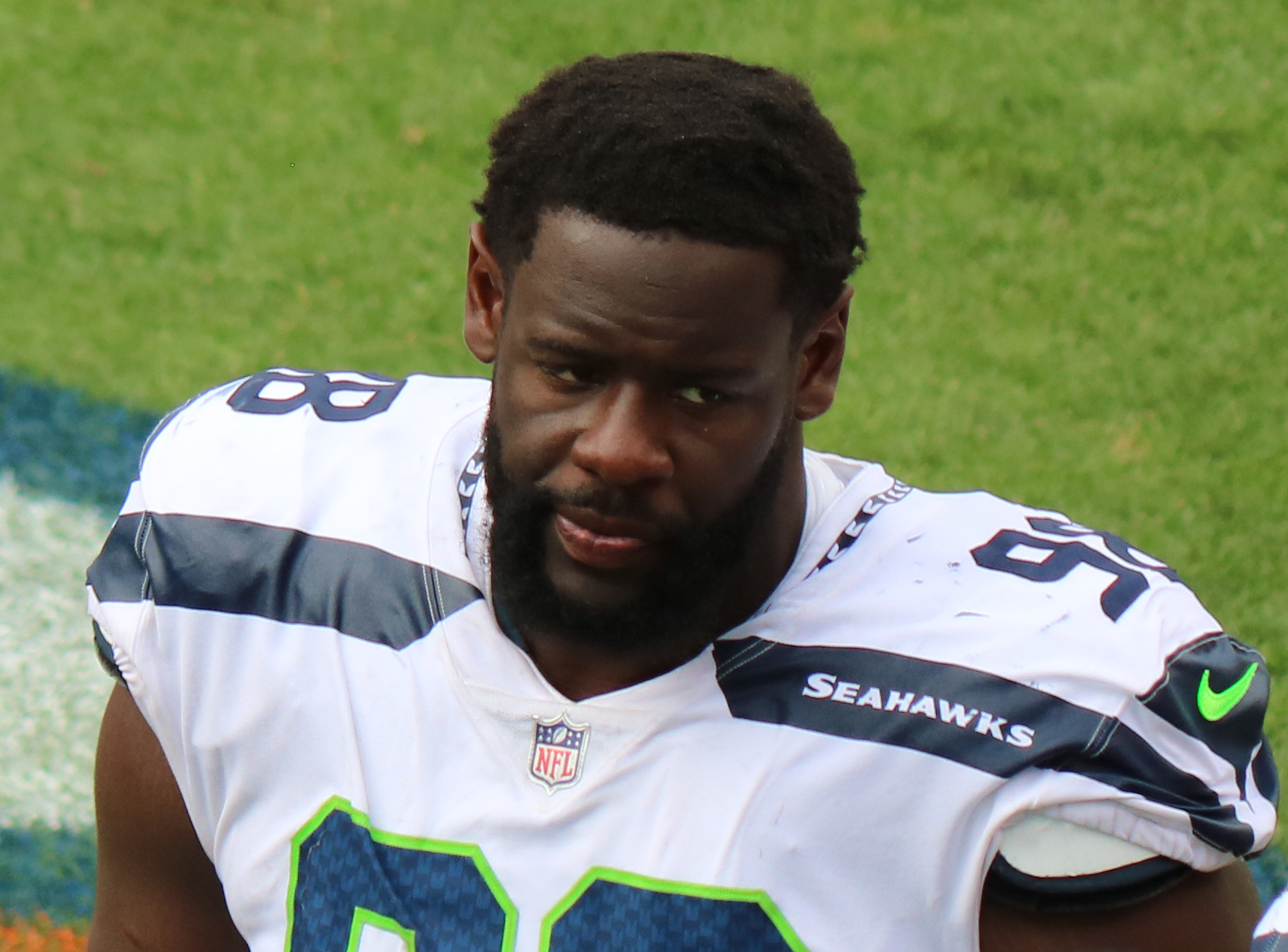
Stephen with the Seahawks in 2018

On March 24, 2018, Stephen signed with the Seattle Seahawks.

=== Return to Minnesota ===
On March 13, 2019, Stephen returned to the Vikings, signing a three-year, $12.45 million contract. In week 4 against the Chicago Bears, Stephen recorded his first sack of his second tenure with the Vikings on Chase Daniel in the 16–6 loss.

Stephen was released on March 16, 2021.

=== Denver Broncos ===
Stephen signed a one-year contract with the Denver Broncos on April 8, 2021.

== Career statistics ==
=== NFL ===
Season		Games		Tackles					Interceptions						Fumbles		
Season	Team	GP	GS	Comb	Total	Ast	Sck	Sfty	PDef	Int	Yds	Avg	Lng	TDs	FF	FR	Yds
2014	Minnesota Vikings	16	3	23	13	10	0.0	--	0	0	0	0.0	0	0	0	0	0
2015	Minnesota Vikings	5	0	2	1	1	0.0	--	0	0	0	0.0	0	0	0	1	0
2016	Minnesota Vikings	16	16	38	16	22	0.0	--	0	0	0	0.0	0	0	0	1	0
2017	Minnesota Vikings	15	1	27	8	19	1.0	--	0	0	0	0.0	0	0	0	0	0
2018	Seattle Seahawks	15	14	22	8	14	2.0	--	0	0	0	0.0	0	0	0	0	0
2019	Minnesota Vikings	15	15	20	14	6	1.0	--	3	0	0	0.0	0	0	0	1	1
2020	Minnesota Vikings	16	16	32	18	14	0.5	--	0	0	0	0.0	0	0	0	0	0
2021	Denver Broncos	17	0	32	10	22	0.0	--	2	0	0	0.0	0	0	0	0	0
Career stats		115	65	196	88	108	4.5	--	5	0	0	0.0	0	0	0	3	1

=== College ===
Regular season statistics				Tackles					Interceptions						Fumbles		
Season	Team	GP	GS	Comb	Total	Ast	Sck	Tfl	PDef	Int	Yds	Avg	Lng	TDs	FF	FR	FR YDS
2010	Connecticut	12	7	27	13	14	2.0	4.0	0	0	0	0.0	0	0	0	0	0
2011	Connecticut	12	12	17	7	10	0.0	1.0	1	0	0	0.0	0	0	0	0	0
2012	Connecticut	12	10	26	14	12	0.0	2.0	4	0	0	0.0	0	0	0	0	0
2013	Connecticut	12	12	60	21	39	3.0	10.0	1	0	0	0.0	0	0	0	0	0
Career stats		48	41	130	55	75	5.0	17.0	6	0	0	0.0	0	0	0	0	0
