= Brandon Watts =

American football player (born 1991)

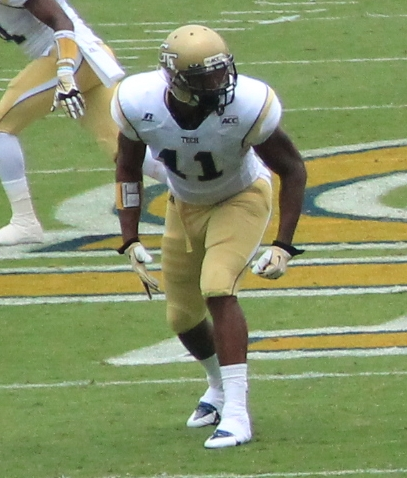
- Watts with the Georgia Tech Yellow Jackets in 2013

No. 58
- Position: Linebacker

Personal information
- Born: January 21, 1991 (age 35); Tennille, Georgia, U.S.
- Listed height: 6 ft 3 in (1.91 m)
- Listed weight: 272 lb (123 kg)

Career information
- High school: Washington County (Sandersville, Georgia)
- College: Georgia Tech
- NFL draft: 2014: 7th round, 223rd overall pick

Career history
- Minnesota Vikings (2014–2015); Miami Dolphins (2016–2017)*; Atlanta Legends (2019)
- * Offseason or practice squad member only

Career NFL statistics
- Total tackles: 8
- Forced fumbles: 2
- Stats at Pro Football Reference

Brandon Watts (born January 21, 1991) is an American former professional football player who was a linebacker in the National Football League (NFL). He played college football for the Georgia Tech Yellow Jackets. He was selected by the Minnesota Vikings in the seventh round of the 2014 NFL draft.

== Early life ==
Watts attended Washington County High School in Sandersville, Georgia, where he earned four varsity letters in football, playing quarterback and safety, and served two years as a team captain. As a senior in 2008, he recorded 86 tackles (nine for loss) and three interceptions on defense, as well as three rushing touchdowns as a quarterback, despite only playing in eight games because of a torn labrum in the shoulder. He was an honorable mention All-State (GHSA), was named to the Augusta Chronicle All-Georgia Team, was named Region 3AAA Defensive Player of the Year and was a first-team All-Middle Georgia. He also ran track and field all four years as a sprinter and played basketball for two seasons.

Regarded as a three-star recruit by Rivals.com, Watts was listed as the 68th-best player in the state of Georgia. He committed to Georgia Tech on March 19, 2008. He also had scholarship offers from Auburn and Georgia.

== College career ==
Watts attended Georgia Institute of Technology, where he played for the Georgia Tech Yellow Jackets football team from 2009 to 2013. He was productive in his two years as a starter, collecting 143 total tackles in 26 games.

In 2012, Watts played a majority of the snaps on defense and recorded 77 tackles.

Watts finished his senior season after coming back from an injury with 66 total tackles (42 solo), and 3.5 tackles for loss. He added an interception, a pass break-up, a forced fumble and 2.5 sacks.

== Professional career ==
=== Pre-draft ===
Pre-draft measurables
Height	Weight	40-yard dash	10-yard split	20-yard split	20-yard shuttle	Three-cone drill	Vertical jump	Broad jump	Bench press
6 ft 0 in (1.83 m)	225 lb (102 kg)	4.41 s	1.51 s	2.55 s	4.21 s	6.89 s	37.5 in (0.95 m)	10 ft 2 in (3.10 m)	16 reps
All values from Pro Day

At his Pro Day, Watts stood out with a 4.41 40-yard dash, 37.5 inches (0.95 m) vertical jump, and 10 ft 3 in (3.12 m) broad jump, which would have all been near the top at this position at the combine. He also posted a 6.89-second three-cone drill.

=== Minnesota Vikings ===
Watts was selected in the seventh round with the 223rd overall pick in the 2014 NFL draft by the Minnesota Vikings. He signed a 4-year, $2,282,448 contract, including a $62,448 signing bonus guaranteed, and an average annual salary of $570,612. On September 3, 2016, he was released by the Vikings as part of final roster cuts.

=== Miami Dolphins ===
Watts was signed to the Miami Dolphins practice squad on September 6, 2016. He signed a reserve/future contract with the Dolphins on January 10, 2017. He was waived on September 2, 2017.

=== Atlanta Legends ===
On August 17, 2018, Watts signed with Atlanta Legends of the Alliance of American Football for the 2019 season. The league ceased operations in April 2019.
