= Rakim Cox =

American gridiron football player (born 1991)

No. 77
- Position: Defensive end

Personal information
- Born: February 12, 1991 (age 35); San Diego, California
- Listed height: 6 ft 4 in (1.93 m)
- Listed weight: 260 lb (118 kg)

Career information
- High school: San Diego (CA)
- College: Villanova
- NFL draft: 2014: undrafted

Career history
- Minnesota Vikings (2014)*; Miami Dolphins (2014)*; Carolina Panthers (2015–2016)*; Saskatchewan Roughriders (2017); Edmonton Eskimos (2018); Toronto Argonauts (2018); Columbus Destroyers (2019)
- * Offseason or practice squad member only
- Stats at Pro Football Reference
- Stats at CFL.ca

Rakim Cox (born February 12, 1991) is a former NFL defensive end. He played college football at Villanova University and signed with the Minnesota Vikings as an undrafted free agent in 2014.

== Early life ==
Cox attended San Diego High School where he was Athlete of the Year and selected All-League first-team in 2008 & 2009.

== Professional career ==
=== Minnesota Vikings ===
On May 11, 2014, Cox signed with the Minnesota Vikings as undrafted free agent following the conclusion of the 2014 NFL draft.

=== Miami Dolphins ===
On August 18, 2014, Cox signed with the Miami Dolphins.

=== Carolina Panthers ===
On May 11, 2015, Cox signed with the Carolina Panthers. On September 5, 2015, he was released by the Panthers. On September 7, 2015, Cox was signed to the Panthers' practice squad.

On February 7, 2016, Cox's Panthers played in Super Bowl 50. In the game, the Panthers fell to the Denver Broncos by a score of 24–10.

On August 30, 2016, Cox was placed on injured reserve. He was waived from injured reserve on September 6, 2016.

He participated in The Spring League in 2017.

=== Saskatchewan Roughriders ===
He was signed to the Saskatchewan Roughriders' practice squad on September 26, 2017.

=== Edmonton Eskimos ===
In 2018, Cox signed with the Edmonton Eskimos, playing in 3 games.

=== Toronto Argonauts ===
On August 31, 2018, Cox signed a practice roster agreement with the Toronto Argonauts.

=== Columbus Destroyers ===
Cox was assigned to the Columbus Destroyers of the Arena Football League on July 9, 2019.

=== Cologne Crocodiles ===
The Cologne Crocodiles of the German Football League announced on January 18, 2020, that they signed Cox for the 2020 season.
