= Matt Hall (American football) =

American football player (born 1990)

No. 73, 75
- Position: Tackle

Personal information
- Born: April 24, 1990 (age 36); Yell County, Arkansas
- Listed height: 6 ft 9 in (2.06 m)
- Listed weight: 324 lb (147 kg)

Career information
- High school: Russellville (AR)
- College: Belhaven
- NFL draft: 2014: undrafted

Career history
- Minnesota Vikings (2014)*; Indianapolis Colts (2014); Denver Broncos (2015)*
- * Offseason or practice squad member only
- Stats at Pro Football Reference

Matthew Hall (born April 24, 1990) is an American former football tackle. He played college football for Belhaven University.

== Professional career ==
Pre-draft measurables
Height	Weight	40-yard dash	Broad jump	Bench press
6 ft 9 1/8 in (2.06 m)	324 lb (147 kg)	5.48 s	8 ft 5 in (2.57 m)	32 reps
All values from Belhaven Pro Day

Hall signed with the Minnesota Vikings as an undrafted free agent on May 10, 2014. Hall was released on July 25 and signed with the Colts on July 27. He was waived with a triceps tear on August 30, and reverted to their injured reserve after going unclaimed. Hall was waived by the Colts on May 4, 2015.

On August 10, 2015, Hall was claimed off of waivers by the Denver Broncos, but elected to retire rather than report to the team.

== Personal life ==
Hall is now an Arkansas State Trooper. He graduated Troop School 2023-B. After Troop School he was assigned to Troop K.
