= Austin Wentworth =

American football player (born 1990)

No. 72
- Position: Offensive guard

Personal information
- Born: May 10, 1990 (age 36); Sacramento, California, U.S.
- Listed height: 6 ft 5 in (1.96 m)
- Listed weight: 303 lb (137 kg)

Career information
- High school: Whitney (Rocklin, California)
- College: Fresno State
- NFL draft: 2014: undrafted

Career history
- Minnesota Vikings (2014–2015)

Awards and highlights
- First-team All-MWC (2013)

Career NFL statistics
- Games played: 7
- Stats at Pro Football Reference

Austin Wentworth (born May 10, 1990) is an American former professional football player who was an offensive guard for one season with the Minnesota Vikings of the National Football League (NFL). He played college football for the Fresno State Bulldogs football and attended Whitney High School in Rocklin, California.

== Early life ==
Wentworth played high school football for the Whitney High School Wildcats. He earned Pioneer Valley League lineman of the year as the Wildcats finished with an 11–2 record, was named First-team All-PVC twice, first-team All-metro, first-team All-state, Whitney High School Athlete of the Year and played in the KCRA3 All-Star Classic. He also lettered in track & field as a thrower in the shot put (47-11 or 14.62m) and the discus (131-5 or 40.13m).

== College career ==
Wentworth played for the Bulldogs at California State University, Fresno, from 2010 to 2013. He was redshirted in 2009. He was named Sports Illustrated honorable mention All-American following his senior season. He was a two-time 1st-Team All-Mountain West selection and finished his career with 43 starts, including 42 consecutive.

== Professional career ==
Wentworth signed with the Minnesota Vikings on May 11, 2014, after going undrafted in the 2014 NFL draft. He was released by the Vikings on August 31 and re-signed to the team on September 2, 2014. He made his NFL debut on October 26, 2014, against the Tampa Bay Buccaneers. Wentworth was released by the Vikings on May 7, 2015.

On May 13, 2015, it was reported that he was retiring due to blood clots in his leg. After surgery, he lost the muscle in his left leg that controlled the up function of his foot and will have to wear a brace for the rest of his life.
