= Mike Hughes (American football) =

American football player (born 1997)

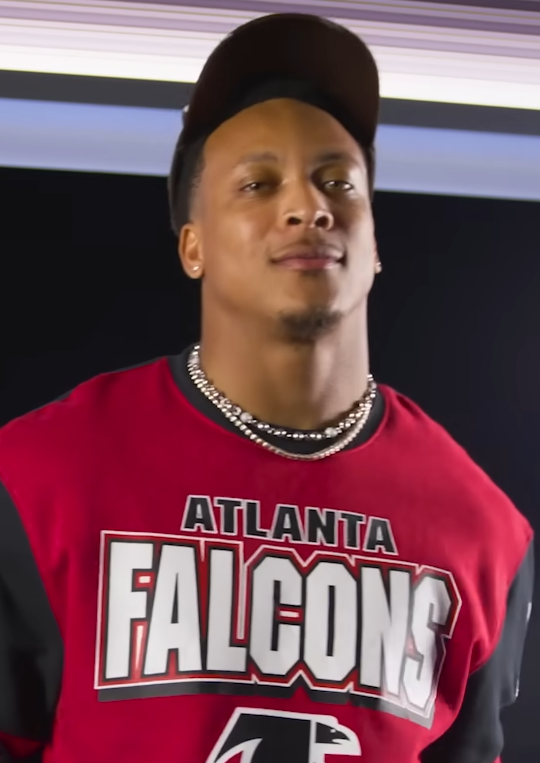
- Hughes in 2023

No. 21 – Atlanta Falcons
- Position: Cornerback
- Roster status: Active

Personal information
- Born: February 11, 1997 (age 29); New Bern, North Carolina, U.S.
- Listed height: 5 ft 10 in (1.78 m)
- Listed weight: 190 lb (86 kg)

Career information
- High school: New Bern
- College: North Carolina (2015); Garden City CC (2016); UCF (2017)
- NFL draft: 2018: 1st round, 30th overall pick

Career history
- Minnesota Vikings (2018–2020); Kansas City Chiefs (2021); Detroit Lions (2022); Atlanta Falcons (2023–present)

Awards and highlights
- Colley Matrix national champion (2017); AAC Fifth Anniversary Team (2018); Second-team All-American (2017); First-team All-AAC (2017)

Career NFL statistics as of Week 5, 2026
- Total tackles: 341
- Forced fumbles: 7
- Fumble recoveries: 4
- Pass deflections: 37
- Interceptions: 4
- Defensive touchdowns: 2
- Stats at Pro Football Reference

Mike Hughes (born February 11, 1997) is an American professional football cornerback for the Atlanta Falcons of the National Football League (NFL). He played college football for the North Carolina Tar Heels before transferring to Garden City Community College and later to UCF. He was selected by the Minnesota Vikings in the first round of the 2018 NFL draft.

== Early life ==
Hughes attended New Bern High School, where he lettered in football, track & field, and basketball. Hughes played quarterback at New Bern. As a senior in 2014, Hughes passed for 1,263 yards and 10 touchdowns and also rushed for 1,355 yards and 22 more touchdowns, guiding his team to an undefeated season and an NCHSAA 4A state championship. He was named to the all-state team and played in the Shrine Bowl of the Carolinas. Hughes was ranked the No. 3 cornerback in North Carolina and committed to the University of North Carolina to play college football.

== College career ==
Hughes played one year at North Carolina in 2015. In October 2015, he was suspended along with M. J. Stewart, and was charged with misdemeanor assault charges from an altercation that had occurred earlier that month. He left the team after the season and transferred to Garden City Community College, where he spent a year.

In 2017, Hughes transferred to the University of Central Florida (UCF) and participated in UCF's undefeated 2017 season which ended in UCF being named National Champions by the Colley Matrix poll. Hughes made headlines with his game-sealing 95-yard kickoff return in the November 24, 2017, War on I–4 game against the South Florida Bulls, with Orlando Sentinel writer Shannon Green remarking that the play saved the undefeated season for the Knights.

Hughes left UCF after one season, deciding to forgo his senior year and enter the 2018 NFL draft.

== Professional career ==
=== Pre-draft ===
ESPN draft analyst Jeff Legwold ranked him as the second best cornerback prospect (10th overall). NFL analyst Mike Mayock ranked Hughes third among all cornerbacks in the draft. Sports Illustrated listed Hughes as the third best cornerback (23rd overall) on their big board. Former NFL executive Gil Brandt had Hughes as the fourth best cornerback (31st overall). Matt Miller of Bleacher Report ranked Hughes as the fifth best cornerback (26th overall) in the draft.

External videos
- Hughes' NFL Combine workout

Pre-draft measurables
Height	Weight	Arm length	Hand span	Wingspan	40-yard dash	10-yard split	20-yard split	20-yard shuttle	Three-cone drill	Vertical jump	Broad jump	Bench press
5 ft 10 1/8 in (1.78 m)	189 lb (86 kg)	30 7/8 in (0.78 m)	8 3/4 in (0.22 m)	6 ft 1 in (1.85 m)	4.53 s	1.59 s	2.68 s	4.13 s	6.70 s	35.5 in (0.90 m)	10 ft 7 in (3.23 m)	20 reps
All values from NFL Combine

=== Minnesota Vikings ===
==== 2018 ====
The Minnesota Vikings selected Hughes in the first round (30th overall) of the 2018 NFL draft. He was the third cornerback drafted in 2018, after Denzel Ward (4th overall) and Jaire Alexander (18th overall).

External videos
- Vikings select Mike Hughes No. 30

On July 19, 2018, the Minnesota Vikings signed Hughes to a four–year, $9.86 million rookie contract that included $8.20 million guaranteed upon signing and an initial signing bonus of $5.25 million.

Throughout training camp, he competed for the role at starting nickelback against Mackensie Alexander under defensive coordinator George Edwards. He was also a possible candidate to be the No. 2 starting cornerback along with Trae Waynes. Head coach Mike Zimmer named him a backup to begin the season, behind Xavier Rhodes, Trae Waynes, and Mackensie Alexander.

During the Vikings' third preseason game, cornerback Mackensie Alexander suffered an ankle injury and was inactive for Week 1. Hughes was subsequently promoted to the third cornerback for their season-opener. On September 9, 2018, Hughes made his professional regular season debut in the Minnesota Vikings' home-opener against the San Francisco 49ers and made three solo tackles, a season-high three pass deflections, forced a fumble, and had his first career interception on Jimmy Garoppolo to wide receiver Kendrick Bourne and returned it 28–yards for the first touchdown of his career, as the Vikings won 16–24. in the Vikings' 24–16 season-opening win over the San Francisco 49ers. In Week 4, Hughes earned his first career start at nickelback and collected a season-high eight solo tackles during a 31–38 loss at the Los Angeles Rams. On October 14, 2018, Hughes had one solo tackle before exiting during the fourth quarter of the Vikings' 27–17 victory against the Arizona Cardinals after suffering a torn ACL. On October 16, 2018, the Vikings officially placed him on injured reserve and corroborated he would undergo surgery to repair his torn ACL and would remain inactive for the remaining ten games (Weeks 7–17) of the 2018 NFL season. He completed his rookie season with 21 combined tackles (18 solo), three pass deflections, one forced fumble, one fumble recovery, one interception, and a touchdown in six games and two starts.

==== 2019 ====
Due to his injury, Hughes could not physically participate in training camp as he was still in the process of recovering from his torn ACL and subsequent surgery. The Vikings signed free agent Bene Benwikere in his absence. He remained inactive for the first two games of the regular season and was listed as the fourth cornerback on the depth chart, behind Xavier Rhodes, Trae Waynes, and Mackensie Alexander.

In Week 5, Hughes recorded three solo tackles and set a season-high with three pass deflections during a 28–10 victory at the New York Giants. In Week 10, he collected a season-high seven solo tackles and made two pass deflections during a 28–24 win at the Dallas Cowboys. On December 15, 2019, Hughes made four solo tackles, had two pass deflections, and made his only interception of the season on a pass thrown by Philip Rivers to wide receiver Mike Williams during a 39–10 win at the Los Angeles Chargers. In Week 17, Hughes started in place of Mackensie Alexander as he was inactive due to a knee injury and subsequently made two solo tackles during a 19–21 loss against the Chicago Bears. Head coach Mike Zimmer announced that Hughes had injured his neck during the game. On January 3, 2020, the Minnesota Vikings placed him on injured reserve after it was discovered he had sustained a broken vertebrae. He finished the season with 45 combined tackles (39 solo), nine passes defensed, two forced fumbles, and an interception in 14 games and three starts. He was also responsible for three fumbles on punt returns. He received an overall grade of 58.7 from Pro Football Focus in 2019, which ranked 78th among 119 qualifying cornerbacks.

==== 2020 ====
During the off-season, the Minnesota Vikings lost all three of their starting cornerbacks following the departures of Xavier Rhodes, Trae Waynes, and Mackensie Alexander. In correspondence to their loss of their top three cornerbacks, the Vikings selected Jeff Gladney in the first round (30th overall) of the 2020 NFL draft. They also saw the departure of defensive coordinator George Edwards and appointed Adam Zimmer and Andre Patterson co-defensive coordinators in his place. Heading into his first training camp, Hughes competed for a starting job against Jeff Gladney, Holton Hill, and Cameron Dantzler. Head coach Mike Zimmer named Hughes the No. 1 starting cornerback to begin the season and paired him with Cameron Dantzler.

On September 13, 2020, Hughes started in the Minnesota Vikings' home-opener against the Green Bay Packers and had a season-high seven combined tackles (four solo) during a 34–43 loss. He was sidelined for two games (Weeks 3–4) after re-aggravating his neck injury. On October 30, 2020, the Vikings placed Hughes on injured reserve due to his reoccurring neck injury and he remained inactive for the last ten games (Weeks 8–17) of the 2020 NFL season. He ended the season with only 13 combined tackles (nine solo) and one pass deflection in four games and two starts.

On May 3, 2021, the Minnesota Vikings declined to exercise the fifth year option on Hughes' rookie contract making him an unrestricted free agent following the 2021 season.

=== Kansas City Chiefs ===
On May 13, 2021, the Kansas City Chiefs acquired Hughes and a 2022 seventh-round (233rd overall) in a trade with the Minnesota Vikings in return for a sixth-round pick in the 2022 NFL Draft. Throughout training camp, he competed for a roster spot as a backup cornerback and the role as the starting nickelback against Deandre Baker, Rashad Fenton, BoPete Keyes, and Marlon Character. Head coach Andy Reid named him the starting nickelback to begin the regular season and listed him as the third cornerback on the depth chart behind starting cornerbacks Charvarius Ward and L'Jarius Sneed.

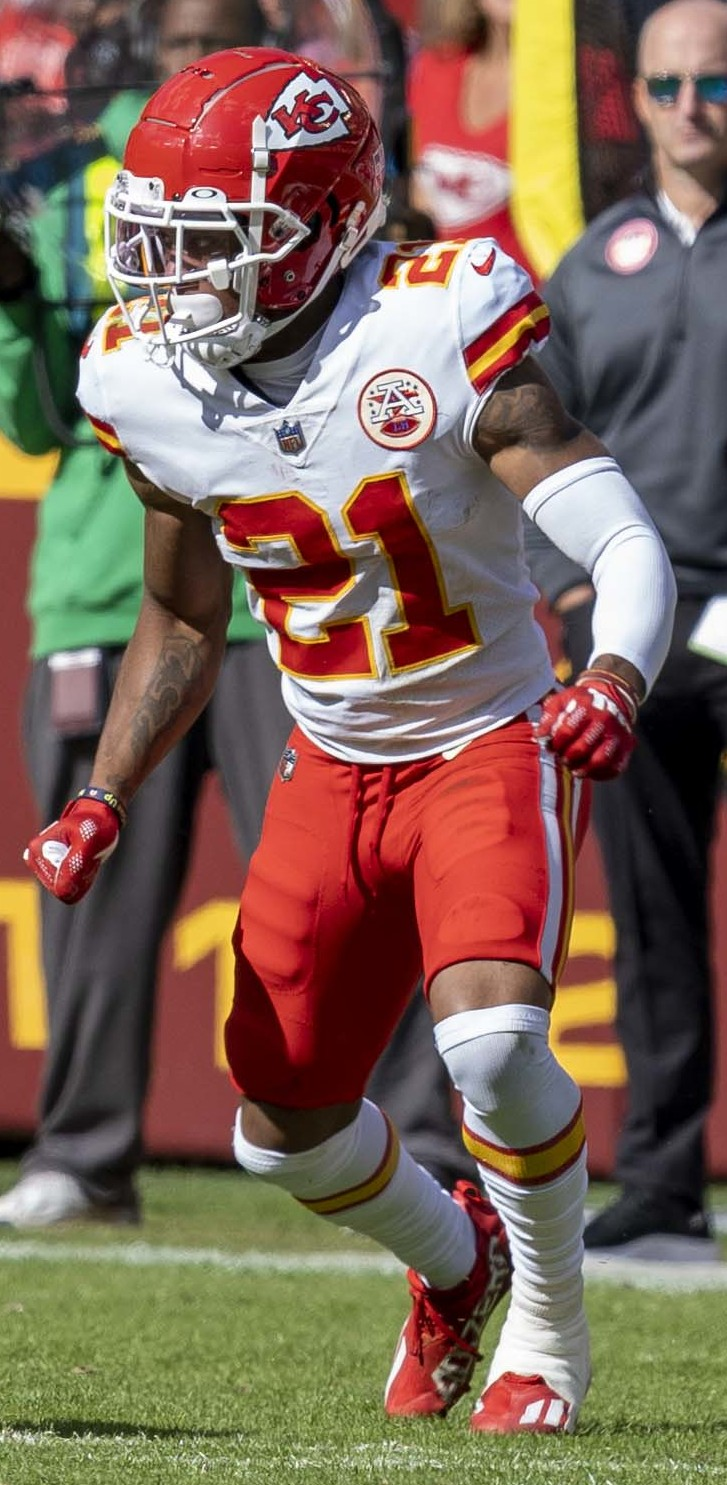
Hughes with the Chiefs in 2021

On September 19, 2021, Hughes started in the Kansas City Chiefs' home-opener against the Cleveland Browns and made two solo tackles, one pass deflection, and secured their 33–29 victory by intercepting a pass by Baker Mayfield to tight end Harrison Bryant with 70 seconds left in the game. On October 23, 2021, Hughes collected a season-high ten combined tackles (nine solo), one pass deflection, and a forced fumble during a 42–20 victory at the Philadelphia Eagles. In Week 14, Hughes had a breakout game recording nine combined tackles (eight solo), two forced fumbles, and recovered a fumble by running back Josh Jacobs for a 23–yard touchdown return during a 48–9 win at the Las Vegas Raiders. His performance earned him the AFC Defensive Player of the Week. He finished the 2021 NFL season with a total of 47 combined tackles (40 solo), six pass deflections, three forced fumbles, one fumble recovery, an interception, and one touchdown in 17 games and five starts. He received an overall grade of 72.9 from Pro Football Focus in 2021.

=== Detroit Lions ===
On March 21, 2022, the Detroit Lions signed Hughes to a one–year, $2.25 million contract that included $1.00 million guaranteed upon signing and an initial signing bonus of $575,000.

Throughout training camp, he competed to be a starting cornerback against Jeff Okudah, Amani Oruwariye, and Will Harris. He also competed against A. J. Parker to be the primary nickelback. Head coach Dan Campbell named him the starting nickelback and listed him as the third cornerback on the depth chart to begin the season, behind starting cornerbacks Amani Oruwariye and Jeff Okudah.

On September 18, 2022, Hughes collected a season-high eight combined tackles (five solo) during a 36–24 win against the Washington Commanders. He was inactive for the Lions' 27–31 loss against the Miami Dolphins in Week 8 due to a knee injury. He finished the 2022 NFL season with 51 combined tackles (35 solo) and one pass deflection in 16 games and six starts. He received an overall grade of 59.9 from Pro Football Focus in 2022, which ranked 75th among 118 qualifying cornerbacks.

=== Atlanta Falcons ===
==== 2023 ====
On March 20, 2023, the Atlanta Falcons signed Hughes a two–year, $7.00 million contract that included $3.24 million guaranteed upon signing and an initial signing bonus of $1.50 million.

Throughout training camp, he competed to be the No. 2 starting cornerback against Jeff Okudah, Dee Alford, and Tre Flowers. He was also a possible candidate at starting nickelback, competing for the role against Clark Phillips III and Dee Alford.Hughes sustained a hip flexor during the preseason and subsequently remained inactive for the Falcons' 24–10 victory against the Carolina Panthers during their home-opener. Upon his return, head coach Arthur Smith named him a backup as the fifth cornerback on the depth chart to begin the season, behind A. J. Terrell, Jeff Okudah, Tre Flowers, and Dee Alford. He was also listed as a backup at nickelback. In Week 4, Hughes collected a season-high five combined tackles (three solo) as the Falcons lost 7–23 at the Jacksonville Jaguars. He was sidelined for the Falcons' 13–8 victory at the New York Jets due to a hand injury. He finished the 2023 NFL season with only 21 combined tackles (14 solo) and one pass deflection in 15 games and four starts. Pro Football Focus had him finish the season with an overall grade of 51.8 in 2023.

==== 2024 ====
Throughout training camp, he competed to be the No. 2 starting cornerback against Clark Phillips III Kevin King, and Antonio Hamilton under the Falcons' new defensive coordinator Jimmy Lake. Head coach Raheem Morris named him a starting cornerback to begin the season and paired him with A. J. Terrell.

On September 8, 2024, Hughes started in the Atlanta Falcons' home-opener against the Pittsburgh Steelers and set a season-high with seven solo tackles during a 10–18 loss. He was inactive for two games (Weeks 11 and 13) after injuring his neck. In Week 16, Hughes made six combined tackles (two solo) and set a season-high with two pass deflections during a 34–7 win against the New York Giants. He finished the 2024 NFL season with a career-high 66 combined tackles (51 solo) and six pass deflections in 15 games and 15 starts. He received an overall grade of 71.9 from Pro Football Focus in 2024, which ranked 34th among 222 qualifying cornerbacks.

==== 2025 ====
On March 13, 2025, the Atlanta Falcons signed Hughes to a three–year, $18.00 million contract extension that included $9.64 million guaranteed upon signing and a signing bonus of $5.00 million. He started 12 games for Atlanta, recording one interception, seven pass deflections, and 51 combined tackles. On January 1, 2026, Hughes was placed on season-ending injured reserve due to an ankle injury suffered in Week 15 against the Tampa Bay Buccaneers.

== NFL career statistics ==
Legend
**Bold**	Career high

=== Regular season ===
Year	Team	Games		Tackles					Interceptions						Fumbles					
Year	Team	GP	GS	Cmb	Solo	Ast	TFL	Sck	PD	Int	Yds	Avg	Lng	TD	FF	FR	Yds	Avg	Lng	TD
2018	MIN	6	2	22	19	3	1	0.0	3	**1**	**28**	**28.0**	**28**	**1**	1	1	0	0.0	0	0
2019	MIN	14	3	45	39	6	1	0.0	**9**	**1**	0	0.0	0	0	2	**2**	0	0.0	0	0
2020	MIN	4	2	13	9	4	0	0.0	1	0	0	0.0	0	0	0	0	0	0.0	0	0
2021	KC	17	5	47	40	7	0	0.0	6	**1**	0	0.0	0	0	**4**	1	**23**	**23.0**	**23**	**1**
2022	DET	16	6	51	35	**16**	3	0.0	1	0	0	0.0	0	0	0	0	0	0.0	0	0
2023	ATL	15	4	21	14	7	2	0.0	1	0	0	0.0	0	0	0	0	0	0.0	0	0
2024	ATL	15	15	**66**	**51**	15	**4**	0.0	6	0	0	0.0	0	0	0	0	0	0.0	0	0
2025	ATL	12	12	51	40	11	2	0.0	7	**1**	6	6.0	6	0	0	0	0	0.0	0	0
2026	ATL	5	5	25	17	8	1	0.0	3	0	0	0.0	0	0	0	0	0	0.0	0	0
Career		104	54	341	264	78	14	0.0	37	4	34	8.5	28	1	7	4	23	5.8	23	1

=== Postseason ===
Year	Team	Games		Tackles					Interceptions						Fumbles					
Year	Team	GP	GS	Cmb	Solo	Ast	TfL	Sck	PD	Int	Yds	Avg	Lng	TD	FF	FR	Yds	Avg	Lng	TD
2021	KC	3	1	5	3	2	0	0.0	0	0	0	0.0	0	0	0	0	0	0.0	0	0
Career		3	1	5	3	2	0	0.0	0	0	0	0.0	0	0	0	0	0	0.0	0	0
