= Xavier Rhodes =

American football player (born 1990)

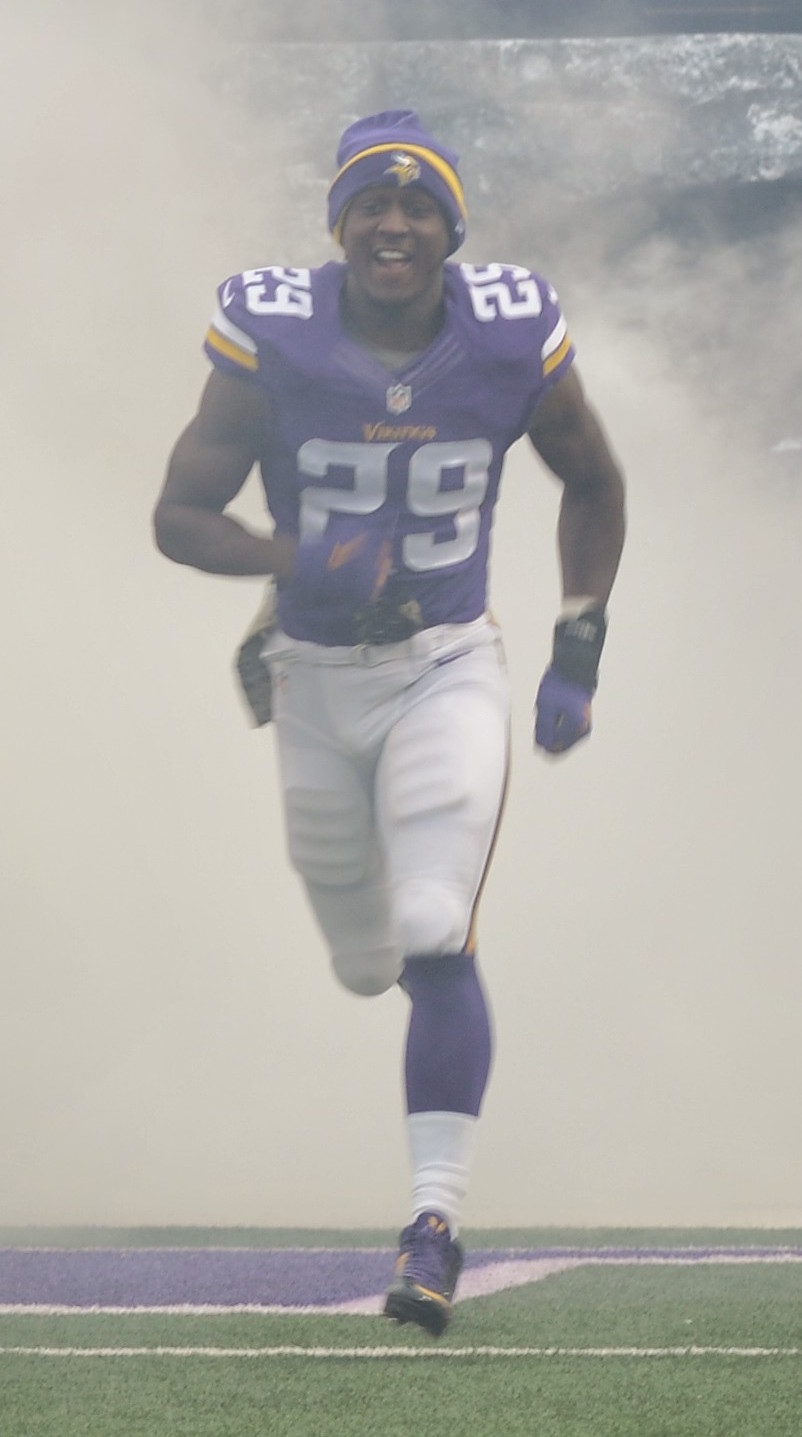
- Rhodes with the Minnesota Vikings in 2014

No. 29, 27, 39
- Position: Cornerback

Personal information
- Born: June 19, 1990 (age 36); Miami, Florida, U.S.
- Listed height: 6 ft 1 in (1.85 m)
- Listed weight: 210 lb (95 kg)

Career information
- High school: Miami Norland (Miami Gardens, Florida)
- College: Florida State (2009–2012)
- NFL draft: 2013: 1st round, 25th overall pick

Career history
- Minnesota Vikings (2013–2019); Indianapolis Colts (2020–2021); Buffalo Bills (2022); Dallas Cowboys (2022)

Awards and highlights
- First-team All-Pro (2017) (Note: Selected as a cornerback); Second-team All-Pro (2017) (Note: Selected as a defensive back); 3× Pro Bowl (2016, 2017, 2019); ACC Defensive Rookie of the Year (2010); First-team All-ACC (2012); Second-team All-ACC (2010)

Career NFL statistics
- Tackles: 457
- Forced fumbles: 3
- Fumble recoveries: 1
- Pass deflections: 92
- Interceptions: 13
- Defensive touchdowns: 2
- Stats at Pro Football Reference

Xavier Rhodes (born June 19, 1990) is an American former professional football player who was a cornerback in the National Football League (NFL). He played college football for the Florida State Seminoles, and was selected by the Minnesota Vikings in the first round of the 2013 NFL draft. With the Vikings, Rhodes made three Pro Bowls and was a first-team All-Pro selection.

== Early life ==
Rhodes attended Miami Norland High School in Miami Gardens, Florida, where he was a two-sport star in football and track. He played as a wide receiver, running back, and defensive back for the Miami Norland Vikings football team. As a junior, he recorded more than 1,000 all-purpose yards. In his senior year, he led his school in both rushing and receiving, and earning a spot on the Miami Herald All-Dade team on both the offensive and defensive side of the ball. He played in the 12th annual Nike South Florida All-Star game. He was honored as 6A FSWA first-team All-state selection, and a first-team All-Dade County athlete.

Rhodes also excelled in track & field at Norland. In his first season of track in 2007, he posted a personal-best time of 48.60 seconds in the 400-meter dash. At the 2008 Sam Burley Hall of Fame Meet, he earned a third-place finish in the 200-meter dash event with a time of 22.25 seconds. As a senior, he qualified for the state finals in the 100-meter dash after running a career-best time of 10.70 seconds in the prelims of the regional championship.

Regarded as a three-star recruit by Rivals.com, Rhodes was listed as the No. 75 wide receiver and the No. 91 prospect in the state of Florida. He chose FSU over scholarship offers from West Virginia, Auburn, and Florida International.

== College career ==
Rhodes received an athletic scholarship to attend Florida State University, where he played for coach Jimbo Fisher's Florida State Seminoles football team from 2009 to 2012. He started 38 of 43 games in the secondary in his distinguished college career.

=== 2009 season ===
As a freshman in 2009, Rhodes played in only two games against Boston College and Georgia Tech on special teams before suffering a hand injury that sidelined him for the rest of the season. He was granted a medical redshirt, preserving him another year of college eligibility.

=== 2010 season ===
In 2010, Rhodes started all 14 games at the boundary cornerback position and emerged as a promising young star for FSU's vastly improved defense. He used his physical attributes to record 12 pass breakups and four interceptions, good for a share of the team lead. His pass breakups and 16 passes defended led all freshmen nationally. He was credited with three pass breakups in pivotal Atlantic Division wins over Boston College and Clemson. He intercepted a pass in the end zone against the Tigers which proved to swing the momentum in the Seminoles' 16–13 victory. His previous interceptions came against BYU and NC State. A sure tackler, the Miami native ranked seventh on the team with 58 stops and his 49 solo tackles ranked fourth. Rhodes's ability to play close to the line of scrimmage in coverage enabled him to collect 3.5 tackles for loss on the season and two sacks. He recovered the first two fumbles of his career in FSU's home finale against Florida in a 31–7 rout. He was named one of the top newcomers on defense at the annual Florida State football banquet. In all, he recorded 54 tackles, four interceptions, and two sacks. He was named the ACC Defensive Rookie of the Year and was a consensus freshman All-American. He earned National Defensive Freshman of the Year honors from Collegefootballnews.com.

=== 2011 season ===
In his redshirt sophomore season in 2011, Rhodes started as part of a three-man cornerback rotation with Mike Harris and Greg Reid. He made five tackles at Clemson, at Wake Forest, and Duke. Against Maryland, Rhodes tallied a season-high six tackles. He intercepted his first pass of the season against NC State. He finished with four tackles in the win over Notre Dame in the 2011 Champs Sports Bowl. He registered 43 stops (36 solo) on the season with 1.5 tackles for loss, one interception, and five pass-breakups for the season. He was selected as the Mr. Dependable Skill Award winner at the team's annual banquet.

=== 2012 ===
For his junior season in 2012, Rhodes was named to preseason watchlists for the Bednarik Award and Nagurski Trophy. He was also the only player from the ACC to be named a semifinalist for the Thorpe Award. He defended 10 passes on the season, placing 11th in the ACC and leading all FSU players, while his three interceptions tied for 8th and also tied for the team lead, leading this to earn first-team All-ACC honors. He also added seven pass break-ups which tied for third on the team. He recorded 39 tackles (27 unassisted) and 2.0 tackles for loss. His third interception and eighth career pick came in the ACC Championship Game versus Georgia Tech. The two other picks came against Murray State and at USF. He forced and recovered a fumble in the Orange Bowl against Northern Illinois. He registered a season-high seven tackles at NC State. He anchored an FSU secondary that held nine of the top 10 receivers in the ACC at the time they faced them to a combined 22 catches for 244 yards. In the last 12 games, he was targeted 47 times and allowed just 13 completions for 88 yards with two interceptions and seven pass break-ups. He helped Florida State's defense lead the nation in yards allowed per play (3.86), rank second nationally in total defense (254.14 ypg) and rank in the top six nationally in scoring defense (14.71 ppg), rushing defense (92.29 ypg), pass defense (161.86 ypg), pass efficiency defense (95.43) and opponent three-and-outs (6.29 per game). He earned the Mr. Dependable Skill Award at the team's annual banquet for the second straight year.

Shortly after FSU's 31–10 victory over Northern Illinois in the 2013 Orange Bowl, Rhodes announced his decision to forgo his final year of collegiate eligibility, entering the 2013 NFL draft. "I did all I could in college. If I was to come back, I don't think my status would be getting any better," said Rhodes.

== Professional career ==
=== Pre-draft ===
Coming out of Florida State, Rhodes was projected as a first-round selection in the 2013 NFL draft by Sports Illustrated.

External videos
- Xavier Rhodes' NFL Combine Workout
- Xavier Rhodes' 40-yard dash

Pre-draft measurables
Height	Weight	Arm length	Hand span	Wingspan	40-yard dash	10-yard split	20-yard split	20-yard shuttle	Three-cone drill	Vertical jump	Broad jump	Bench press
6 ft 1 1/2 in (1.87 m)	210 lb (95 kg)	33 3/4 in (0.86 m)	9 in (0.23 m)	6 ft 7 1/8 in (2.01 m)	4.43 s	1.58 s	2.59 s	4.65 s	7.29 s	40.5 in (1.03 m)	11 ft 0 in (3.35 m)	14 reps
All values from NFL Combine/Pro Day

=== Minnesota Vikings ===
==== 2013 ====
The Minnesota Vikings selected Rhodes in the first round (25th overall) of the 2013 NFL draft. The pick used to select him was acquired from the Seattle Seahawks in a trade for Percy Harvin. He was the fourth cornerback selected in 2013 and was the highest selected defensive back from Florida State since Antonio Cromartie was taken 19th overall by the San Diego Chargers in the 2006 NFL draft.

External videos
- Vikings draft Xavier Rhodes 25th overall
- NFL Draft Profile: Xavier Rhodes

On July 13, 2013, the Vikings signed Rhodes to a four–year, $7.80 million contract that includes $6.33 million guaranteed and a signing bonus of $4.05 million.

Rhodes began training camp slated as a starting cornerback, but saw competition for the role from Josh Robinson. Head coach Leslie Frazier named Rhodes the third cornerback on the depth chart, behind veterans Chris Cook and Josh Robinson. He was also selected to be the starting nickelback in nickel and dime packages.

He made his professional regular season debut and first career start in the Minnesota Vikings' season-opener at the Detroit Lions and recorded three solo tackles in their 34–24 loss. Rhodes made his first career tackle on wide receiver Calvin Johnson after a seven-yard reception in the second quarter. On October 27, 2013, Rhodes recorded a season-high seven solo tackles during a 44–31 loss to the Green Bay Packers. In Week 12, Rhodes earned his first start as an outside cornerback after Josh Robinson sustained a fractured sternum the previous week and was expected to be sidelined for a month. Rhodes recorded a season-high four pass deflections and made four solo tackles during a 26–26 tie at the Green Bay Packers. On December 8, 2013, Rhodes made three solo tackles and three pass deflections before exiting the Vikings' 29–26 loss at the Baltimore Ravens after sustaining an ankle injury. He was sidelined for the last three games of the season (Weeks 15–17). On December 30, 2013, it was announced that the Minnesota Vikings fired head coach Leslie Frazier after finishing fourth in the NFC North with a 5–10–1 record. He finished his rookie season in 2013 with 48 combined tackles (41 solo) and ten pass deflections in 13 games and six starts.

==== 2014 ====
Rhodes entered training camp slated as one of the starting outside cornerbacks. Head coach Mike Zimmer officially named Rhodes the starter to begin the regular season, along with Captain Munnerlyn.

In Week 4, he tied a career-high with four pass deflections and made five combined tackles in the Vikings' 41–28 victory over the Atlanta Falcons. On November 16, 2014, Rhodes collected four combined tackles, broke up a pass, and made his first career interception off a pass by Jay Cutler during a 21–13 loss at the Chicago Bears in Week 11. In Week 16, Rhodes collected a season-high five solo tackles in the Vikings' 37–35 loss at the Miami Dolphins. He finished the season with 49 combined tackles (39 solo), a career-high 18 pass deflections, and an interception in 16 games and 16 starts. His 18 pass deflections led the Vikings' defense and finished third among all players in the league. The Minnesota Vikings finished with a 7–9 record, but were able to improve to seventh overall in pass defense after finishing 31st the previous season.

==== 2015 ====
The Minnesota Vikings acquired Terence Newman and 2015 first-round pick Trae Waynes in 2015. Defensive coordinator George Edwards named Rhodes the No. 1 starting cornerback, opposite Terence Newman, to begin the regular season.

He started the Minnesota Vikings' season-opener at the San Francisco 49ers and collected a season-high seven solo tackles in their 20–3 loss. On January 3, 2016, Rhodes made three solo tackles, a pass deflection, and intercepted a pass by Aaron Rodgers during a 20–13 victory at the Green Bay Packers. He finished the 2015 season with a career-high 58 combined tackles (55 solo), ten pass deflections, and an interception in 16 games and 16 starts.

The Minnesota Vikings finished their second season under head coach Mike Zimmer with an 11–5 record and first in the NFC North. On January 10, 2016, Rhodes started in his first career playoff game and recorded four solo tackles and two pass deflections during a 10–9 loss to the Seattle Seahawks in the NFC Wild Card Round.

==== 2016 ====
On May 2, 2016, the Minnesota Vikings opted to exercise the fifth–year, $8.02 million option on Rhodes' rookie contract. Throughout training camp, he competed against Terence Newman, Trae Waynes, and rookie Mackensie Alexander for a role as a starting cornerback. Head coach Mike Zimmer retained Xavier Rhodes and Terence Newman as the starting cornerbacks to begin the regular season.

While preparing to play in the season-opener against the Tennessee Titans, Rhodes sustained a knee injury while stretching on the field. His injury sidelined him for the first two games (Weeks 1–2) of the season. On October 3, 2016, Rhodes recorded two solo tackles, broke up two passes, and intercepted quarterback Eli Manning during a 24–10 victory against the New York Giants on Monday Night Football. He was a key part of the secondary that held Odell Beckham Jr. to only five receptions for 23–yards. In Week 11, Rhodes recorded three combined tackles (two solo), made two pass deflections, set a season-high with interceptions on passes by quarterback Carson Palmer, and returned one for his first career touchdown as the Vikings defeated the Arizona Cardinals 30–24. He scored the first touchdown of his career in the second quarter after he picked off a pass thrown by Carson Palmer that was intended for wide receiver John Brown in the endzone and returned it 100–yards to score a touchdown. His performance earned him NFC Defensive Player of the Week. On December 20, 2016, Rhodes was voted to the 2017 Pro Bowl, marking the first of his career. In Week 16, Rhodes collected a season-high seven combined tackles (six solo) during a 38–25 loss at the Green Bay Packers. He finished the season with 52 combined tackles (44 solo), 11 pass deflections, five interceptions, and one touchdown in 14 games and 14 starts.

The Minnesota Vikings were unable to qualify for the playoffs after finishing third in their division with an 8–8 record. Rhodes was ranked the 66th best player in the NFL on the NFL Top 100 Players of 2017.

==== 2017 ====
On July 30, 2017, the Minnesota Vikings signed Rhodes to a five–year, $70.10 million extension that includes $32.80 million guaranteed upon signing and an initial signing bonus of $12.00 million. Head coach Mike Zimmer named Rhodes and Trae Waynes the starting cornerbacks to start the regular season.

In Week 6, he recorded two solo tackles, made one pass deflection, and picked off a pass thrown by Brett Hundley to wide receiver Geronimo Allison as the Vikings defeated the Green Bay Packers 23–10. On November 23, 2017, Rhodes set a season-high with five solo tackles, made two pass deflections, and intercepted a pass by Matthew Stafford during a 30–23 victory at the Detroit Lions. The following week, he tied his season-high of five solo tackles in the Vikings' 14–9 victory at the Atlanta Falcons in Week 13. On December 19, 2017, it was announced that Rhodes was voted to the 2018 Pro Bowl. He finished the 2017 season with 56 combined tackles (44 solo), ten pass deflections, and two interceptions in 16 games and 16 starts. He was named as a first team All-Pro.

The Minnesota Vikings finished atop the NFC North with a 13–3 record and received a first round bye. On January 14, 2018, Rhodes recorded two solo tackles and two pass deflections during the Vikings' 29–24 win against the New Orleans Saints in the NFC Divisional Round. The Vikings were eliminated from the playoffs the following week after losing 38–7 at the Philadelphia Eagles in the NFC Championship Game. He was ranked 55th on the NFL Top 100 Players of 2018.

==== 2018 ====
He entered training camp slated as a starting cornerback, but received competition from 2018 first-round pick (30th overall) Mike Hughes. Head coach Mike Zimmer named Rhodes the No. 1 starting cornerback to begin the season, alongside Trae Waynes. On September 9, 2018, Rhodes started in the Minnesota Vikings' home-opener against the San Francisco 49ers and made two solo tackles, a pass deflection, and made his only interception of the season on a pass by Jimmy Garoppolo to wide receiver Dante Pettis during a 24–16 victory. The following week, he set a season-high with eight solo tackles during a 29–29 overtime tie at the Green Bay Packers in Week 2. He was inactive as the Vikings lost 20–30 to the New Orleans Saints in Week 8 after injuring his foot. He was also inactive during a 10–24 loss against the Chicago Bears in Week 17 due to a hamstring injury. He finished the 2018 NFL season with a total of 47 combined tackles (41 solo), one interception, and seven passes defended in 14 games and 14 starts.

==== 2019 ====
He returned as the Minnesota Vikings' No. 1 starting cornerback, alongside Trae Waynes, to begin the regular season for the third season in-a-row. In Week 4, he set a season-high with eight combined tackles (seven solo) and recorded one pass deflection during a 6–16 loss at the Chicago Bears. On December 2, 2019, Rhodes set a new season-high with eight solo tackles as the Vikings lost 30–37 at the Seattle Seahawks. He finished the 2019 NFL season with a total of 63 combined tackles (54 solo), six passes defended, and one forced fumble in 15 games and 15 starts. He was named to the Pro Bowl.

On March 13, 2020, the Minnesota Vikings released Rhodes after seven seasons.

=== Indianapolis Colts ===
On March 30, 2020, the Indianapolis Colts signed Rhodes to a one–year, $4.77 million contract that includes $3.75 million guaranteed. He entered training camp as the projected as a starting cornerback following the departure of Quincy Wilson. Head coach Frank Reich named Rhodes the No. 1 starting cornerback on the depth chart to begin the season, alongside Rock Ya-Sin and nickelback Kenny Moore II.

On September 27, 2020, Rhodes made one solo tackle, two pass deflections, tied his career-high of two interceptions, and returned one for his second career touchdown on pass attempts thrown by Sam Darnold as the Colts defeated the New York Jets 36–7. He scored his touchdown on a pick-six during the games opening drive, intercepting a pass by Sam Darnold to wide receiver Lawrence Cager and returned it 44–yards to score the second touchdown of his career. His performance in Week 3 earned him the AFC Defensive Player of the Week. In Week 6, he recorded three solo tackles and set a season-high with three pass deflections during a 31–27 win against the Cincinnati Bengals. In Week 15, Rhodes set a season-high with seven solo tackles as the Colts defeated the Houston Texans 27–20. He started all 16 games throughout the 2020 NFL season and finished with a total of 42 combined tackles (35 solo), 12 passes defended, two interceptions, and one touchdown.

On March 24, 2021, the Indianapolis Colts re-signed Rhodes to a one–year contract extension. He returned as the Colts' No. 1 starting cornerback to begin the season, alongside Rock Ya-Sin and nickelback Kenny Moore II. Due to a calf injury he was inactive for the first two games (Weeks 1–2) of the season. On October 24, 2021, Rhodes made four combined tackles (three solo), set a season-high with two pass deflections, and had his only interception of the season on a pass by Jimmy Garoppolo to wide receiver Deebo Samuel during a 30–18 victory at the San Francisco 49ers. He re-injured his calf and would subsequently be sidelined as the Colts defeated the Jacksonville Jaguars 23–17 in Week 10. In Week 12, he set a season-high with five combined tackles (four solo) and recorded a pass deflection during a 31–38 loss to the Tampa Bay Buccaneers. He was unable to appear in the Colts' 11–26 loss at the Jacksonville Jaguars in Week 18 after injuring his hamstring. He completed the 2021 NFL season with a total of 39 combined tackles (32 solo), seven passes defensed and one interception in 13 games and 13 starts.

=== Buffalo Bills ===
On September 28, 2022, the Buffalo Bills signed Rhodes to their practice squad. On November 26, the Bills promoted him to the active roster. Rhodes was released by Buffalo on January 4, 2023.

=== Dallas Cowboys ===
On January 7, 2023, the Dallas Cowboys signed Rhodes to their practice squad. On January 16, Rhodes was elevated to the active roster and made his Cowboys debut against the Tampa Bay Buccaneers in the NFC Wild Card Round. On January 21, the Cowboys elevated Rhodes to the active roster from the practice squad. On January 30, Dallas officially released Rhodes.

== Career statistics ==
=== NFL ===
Year	Team	Games		Tackles				Interceptions						Fumbles	
Year	Team	GP	GS	Cmb	Solo	Ast	Sck	PD	Int	Yds	Avg	Lng	TD	FF	FR
2013	MIN	13	6	48	41	7	0.0	10	0	0	0.0	0	0	1	0
2014	MIN	16	16	48	39	9	0.0	18	1	0	0.0	0	0	0	0
2015	MIN	16	16	58	55	3	0.0	11	1	0	0.0	0	0	0	0
2016	MIN	14	14	52	44	8	0.0	11	5	133	26.6	100	1	1	0
2017	MIN	16	16	56	44	12	0.0	10	2	23	11.5	21	0	0	0
2018	MIN	14	14	47	41	6	0.0	7	1	3	3.0	3	0	0	0
2019	MIN	15	15	63	54	9	0.0	6	0	0	0.0	0	0	1	0
2020	IND	16	16	42	35	7	0.0	12	2	44	22.0	44	1	0	0
2021	IND	13	13	39	32	7	0.0	7	1	4	4.0	4	0	0	1
2022	BUF	2	1	4	3	1	0.0	0	0	0	0.0	0	0	0	0
Career		135	127	457	388	69	0.0	92	13	203	15.9	100	2	3	1

=== College ===
Season	Team	Games		Tackles				Interceptions						Fumbles	
Season	Team	GP	GS	Cmb	Solo	Ast	Sck	PD	Int	Yds	Avg	Lng	TD	FF	FR
2010	Florida State	14	14	58	49	9	2.0	16	4	40	10.0	23	0	1	0
2011	Florida State	13	13	43	36	7	0.0	5	1	0	0.0	0	0	0	0
2012	Florida State	14	14	39	27	12	0.0	10	3	14	4.7	14	0	0	0
Career		43	43	140	112	28	2.0	31	8	54	6.8	23	0	1	0

== Career highlights ==
=== Awards and honors ===
NFL

- First-team All-Pro (2017) (Note: Selected as a cornerback)
- Second-team All-Pro (2017) (Note: Selected as a defensive back)
- 3× Pro Bowl (2016, 2017, 2019)
- 2× NFL Top 100 — 66th (2017), 55th (2018)

College

- ACC Defensive Rookie of the Year (2010)
- First-team All-ACC (2012)
- Second-team All-ACC (2010)

=== Minnesota Vikings franchise records ===
- Most passes defended by a rookie: 10 (2013)
- Longest interception return: 100 yards (2016)
