= Terence Newman =

American football player (born 1978)

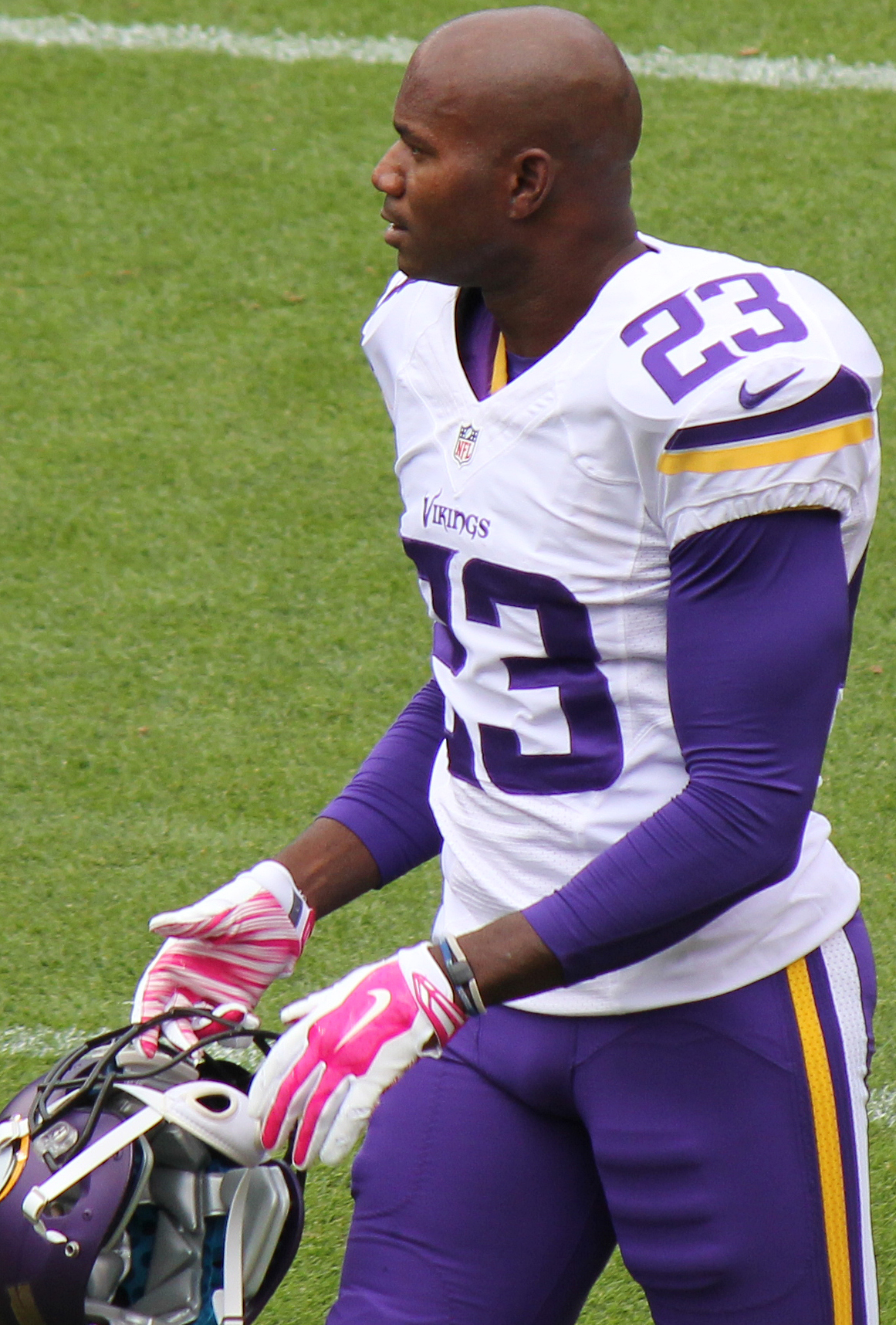
- Newman with the Minnesota Vikings in 2015

No. 41, 23
- Position: Cornerback

Personal information
- Born: September 4, 1978 (age 48); Salina, Kansas, U.S.
- Listed height: 5 ft 10 in (1.78 m)
- Listed weight: 197 lb (89 kg)

Career information
- High school: Salina Central
- College: Kansas State (1998–2002)
- NFL draft: 2003: 1st round, 5th overall pick

Career history

Playing
- Dallas Cowboys (2003–2011); Cincinnati Bengals (2012–2014); Minnesota Vikings (2015–2017)

Coaching
- Minnesota Vikings (2018) Nickel / Defensive backs coach

Awards and highlights
- 2 × Pro Bowl (2007, 2009); PFWA All-Rookie Team (2003); Jim Thorpe Award (2002); Unanimous All-American (2002); Big 12 Defensive Player of the Year (2002); First-team All-Big 12 (2002); Second-team All-Big 12 (2001); Kansas State Hall of Fame (2018)

Career NFL statistics
- Total tackles: 876
- Forced fumbles: 8
- Fumble recoveries: 7
- Pass deflections: 184
- Interceptions: 42
- Touchdowns: 5
- Stats at Pro Football Reference
- College Football Hall of Fame

Terence Newman (born September 4, 1978) is an American former professional football player who was a cornerback for 15 seasons in the National Football League (NFL) for the Dallas Cowboys, Cincinnati Bengals, and Minnesota Vikings. He played college football for the Kansas State Wildcats, earning unanimous All-American recognition. He was selected by the Cowboys with the fifth overall pick in the 2003 NFL draft.

== Early life ==
A native of Salina, Kansas, Newman attended Salina High School Central, where he lettered as a junior and senior in football, three times in track & field and basketball and once in baseball for the Mustangs. As a senior in football, he had 10 receptions for 251 yards and three touchdowns playing as a wide receiver on offense, while also making 45 tackles, five interceptions and five PBUs on the defensive side. In addition, he also returned 13 punts for 271 yards (20.9 avg.), two of them for touchdowns. He was an All-Class 5A selection by the Topeka Capital Journal and Wichita Eagle. He was listed as one of the top 20 recruits in the state of Kansas by First Down Recruiting and was a PrepStar All-Region selection.

Apart from football, Newman was also an outstanding track & field performer with times of 10.36 seconds in the 100-meter dash and 21.6 seconds in the 200-meter dash entering his senior season.

== College career ==
Newman attended Kansas State University, where he played as a defensive back for head coach Bill Snyder's Kansas State Wildcats football from 1998 to 2002. His first two seasons he was a backup, until he became a starter and a second-team Big 12 selection as a junior. During his college career, he was also a special teams returner (second player in team history to score on a kickoff and punt return in the same season) and was used sparingly as a wide receiver. He was also a member of the Wildcats track & field team.

He redshirted his first year in 1998, and then went on to play from 1999 to 2002.

=== Freshman year ===
Still a developing backup defensive back in his second year, Newman saw action in all 11 games as a freshman in 1999. He became an outstanding special teams player, returning a 73-yard kickoff against Baylor. He snagged his first career interception in a 66–0 win over Missouri. He had an impressive spring game with 10 tackles, two passes broken up and an interception that he returned 18 yards.

=== Sophomore year ===
Newman played in all 14 games as a sophomore in 2000. He recorded a career-high five tackles, including career-high three solos vs. Louisiana Tech in his first career start. He scored a touchdown on a 16-yard blocked-punt against Oklahoma.

In track & field, Newman Finished third in the 60-meter dash (6.76s) at the Big 12 Indoor Track & Field Championships, but posted a season-best of 6.72 seconds in the prelims, that rank 2nd all-time behind football teammate Aaron Lockett. He had a season-best time of 21.34 seconds in the 200-meter dash, and was a member of the Wildcats' 4 × 100 m relay team that placed fifth at Big 12 Championships.

=== Junior year ===
As a junior in 2001, Newman was a second team All-Big 12 selection by the coaches, Dallas Morning News, Fort Worth Star-Telegram and Waco Tribune-Herald, and also an honorable mention All-Big 12 selection by the Associated Press (AP). He was named one of 10 semifinalists for the Jim Thorpe Award, given to the top defensive back of the year. He shared the Most Improved Defensive Player award with Terry Pierce. He started all 11 games at cornerback, and was just one of eight Wildcats to start all 11 games at the same position. He ranked fifth in the Big 12 and 16th in the nation in passes defended with 19. He was tabbed as coaches' Special Teams Player of the Game three times (USC, Texas A&M and Louisiana Tech). He ranked fifth on the team with 51 total tackles, including 44 solo stops, led the team with 14 PBUs and two blocked kicks and was third with three interceptions. He had an impressive all-around day against Oklahoma, picking off two passes and defending seven more to go with six solo tackles, leading this to be named the Defensive Player of the Game by the Kansas State coaches. He tied a season-high with seven tackles and blocked his second kick of the season vs. Nebraska. Against Missouri, he got his third interception of the season and also added three other PBUs and five tackles. Newman also server ad a kick returner, and ranks second behind Aaron Lockett in returns, yards and average, totalling 211 yards on nine kickoffs with a 23.4 yards per return average. He also tallied a season-best 81 return yards on two carries against Missouri.

In track & field, Newman was just one of two athletes to represent Kansas State's men's team at the NCAA Indoor Nationals, where he finished 15th in the 60 meters. He set a pair of school records for the Wildcats at the 2001 Big 12 Indoor Track and Field Championships, running a 6.67 in the 60-meter dash semifinals to break the old mark of 6.69 set in 1999 by football teammate Aaron Lockett, while also setting Kansas State's indoor 200-meter dash record with a time of 21.17 seconds. He earned NCAA Outdoor All-American honors in the 100 meters after finishing 12th in a time of 10.49 seconds at the 2001 NCAA Outdoor T&F Championships. He was the Big 12 Outdoor Champion in 100-meter dash with a mark of 10.29 seconds, and set a new school record with a 10.22 mark in qualifying for that event.

=== Senior year ===
As a senior in 2002, Newman recorded 54 tackles, five interceptions and 14 pass deflections. He was a first-team All-Big 12 selection, as well as the Big 12 Conference Defensive Player of the Year and a unanimous All-American. He also won the Jim Thorpe Award as the nation's best defensive back, and was a finalist for the Bronko Nagurski Trophy as the nation's best defensive player.

In track & field, Newman defended his Big 12 Outdoor Championship in the 100 meters with a win at Missouri (10.34s). He reached the NCAA semifinals in the 100 m, but did not make the final rounds. He broke his own outdoor school record in the 100-meter dash after clocking a 10.20 at the Jim Click Shootout in his first outdoor meet of the year. He collected his first All-America honor by finishing fifth in the 60 meters at the NCAA Indoor Championship with a time of 6.67 seconds. He was the Big 12 Indoor Champion in the 60-meter dash, clocking a 6.65 in the finals after posting a school-record 6.62 in the prelims. He finished second in the 200 meters at the Big 12s with an NCAA provisional time of 21.42. He also won the 60 meters in 6.70 seconds at the KSU Open, his only regular-season appearance.

=== After college ===
On January 14, 2026, Newman was inducted into the College Football Hall of Fame.

== Professional career ==
Pre-draft measurables
| Height | Weight | Arm length | Hand span | 40-yard dash | 10-yard split | 20-yard split | 20-yard shuttle | Three-cone drill | Vertical jump | Broad jump | Bench press |
|---|---|---|---|---|---|---|---|---|---|---|---|
| 5 ft 10 3/8 in (1.79 m) | 189 lb (86 kg) | 31 3/8 in (0.80 m) | 8 3/4 in (0.22 m) | 4.37 s | 1.56 s | 2.61 s | 3.83 s | 6.88 s | 41.0 in (1.04 m) | 11 ft 4 in (3.45 m) | 10 reps |
All values from NFL Combine

=== Dallas Cowboys ===
The Dallas Cowboys selected Newman in the first round (fifth overall) of the 2003 NFL draft. As the fifth overall pick, Newman became Kansas State's highest draft pick in school history, surpassing Clarence Scott who was drafted 14th overall by the Cleveland Browns in the 1971 NFL draft. He entered the league as a 25-year-old rookie.

==== 2003 ====
On July 24, 2003, the Dallas Cowboys signed Newman to a six–year, $18.41 million contract that includes a signing bonus of $13 million. The contract is worth up to $33 million with incentives and includes a seventh–year option.

He entered training camp slated as the No. 2 starting cornerback following the departure of Bryant Westbrook. Head coach Bill Parcells named him as the No. 2 starting cornerback to begin the season, alongside Mario Edwards.

On September 7, 2003, Newman made his professional regular season debut and earned his first career start in the Dallas Cowboys' home-opener against the Atlanta Falcons and recorded five solo tackles and made one pass deflection during their 27–13 loss. In Week 2, Newman made five solo tackles, set a career-high with four pass deflections, and made his first career interception on a pass attempt by Kerry Collins to tight end Jeremy Shockey during a 35–32 victory at the New York Giants. In Week 5, he recorded five solo tackles, made one pass deflection, and had his first career sack on quarterback Jeff Blake in the Cowboys' 26–7 win against the Arizona Cardinals. In Week 13, he made a season-high seven solo tackles and had a fumble recovery as the Cowboys lost 40–21 to the Miami Dolphins. On December 14, 2003, Newman recorded five combined tackles (three solo), made three pass deflections, and set a career-high with three interceptions on passes thrown by Tim Hasselbeck during a 27–0 victory at the Washington Redskins. He tied the franchise record for most interceptions in a single game. He started in all 16 games throughout the 2003 NFL season and finished with a total of 76 combined tackles (66 solo), 14 pass deflections, four interceptions, and a sack.

The Dallas Cowboys finished second in the NFC East with a 10–6 record and received a wildcard berth. On January 3, 2004, Newman started his first career playoff game and recorded five solo tackles in the Cowboys' 29–10 loss at the Carolina Panthers in the NFC Wildcard Game.

==== 2004 ====
He entered training camp slated as the No. 1 cornerback on the depth chart. Head coach Bill Parcells officially named him the No. 1 starting cornerback to begin the regular season and paired him with Pete Hunter. Due to injuries, Newman was paired with multiple different cornerbacks throughout the season, including Pete Hunter (3), Lance Frazier (8), Tyrone Williams (2), and Jacques Reeves (1).

In Week 6, Newman collected a season-high 12 combined tackles (11 solo) during a 24–20 loss against the Pittsburgh Steelers. On December 26, 2004, he made three solo tackles, two pass deflections, and an interception in the Cowboys' 13–10 victory against the Washington Redskins in Week 16. He finished the season with 68 combined tackles (64 solo), 15 pass deflections, and four interceptions in 16 games and 16 starts. He also returned two punts for 13-yards.

Newman with the Cowboys in 2009.

==== 2005 ====
Defensive coordinator Mike Zimmer retained Newman as the No. 1 cornerback to begin the regular season, alongside Anthony Henry. In Week 2, Newman collected five solo tackles, broke up a pass, and made an interception during a 14–13 loss to the Washington Redskins. In Week 10, he made four combined tackles and a season-high three pass deflections in the Cowboys' 21–20 victory at the Philadelphia Eagles. On January 1, 2006, Newman collected a season-high six solo tackles during a 20–10 loss to the St. Louis Rams in Week 17. He finished the 2005 season with 59 combined tackles (56 solo), 14 passes defensed, three interceptions, and a sack in 16 games and 16 starts. Newman did not give up a single touchdown reception in coverage throughout the 2005 regular season and also had ten punt returns for 55-yards (5.50 YPR).

==== 2006 ====
Head coach Bill Parcells retained Newman and Anthony Henry as the starting cornerback duo in 2006. In Week 7, he collected a season-high six solo tackles, a pass deflection, and an interception in the Cowboys' 36–22 loss to the New York Giants. On December 10, 2006, Newman recorded a season-high seven combined tackles and a pass deflection during a 42–17 loss to the New Orleans Saints in Week 14. On December 31, 2006, Newman had two solo tackles and two punt returns for 56-yards and a touchdown in a 39–31 loss to the Detroit Lions in Week 17. He returned a punt for a 56-yard touchdown in the third quarter to mark the first score of his career. Newman completed the season with 63 combined tackles (53 solo), 11 pass deflections, and an interception in 16 games and 16 starts. Newman also had 20 punt returns for 202 return yards (10.1 YPR) and a touchdown.

==== 2007 ====
On January 23, 2007, head coach Bill Parcells announced his retirement from coaching after the Cowboys finished with a 9–7 record in 2006 and were defeated 21–20 by the Seattle Seahawks in the NFC Wildcard Game due to a fumbled snap on a rain slicked field by Tony Romo during an extra point. New head coach Wade Phillips officially named Newman and Anthony Henry the starting cornerbacks to begin the season, with Jacques Reeves filling in for Newman during his absence.

Newman developed plantar fasciitis in his foot during the preseason and was inactive for the rest of the preseason and the first two regular season games (Weeks 1–2). On October 8, 2007, Newman recorded five combined tackles, a pass deflection, and an interception during the Cowboys' 25–24 comeback victory at the Buffalo Bills in Week 5. Newman made a key interception off a pass deflection by teammate DeMarcus Ware. Ware deflected a pass by quarterback Trent Edwards and Newman returned it for a 70-yard gain in the fourth quarter to set up a touchdown pass by Tony Romo as the Cowboys were down 24–16. The Cowboys defeated the Bills after a last second 37-yard field goal by Nick Folk and advanced to a 5–0 record. On December 19, 2007, it was announced that Newman was named to the 2008 Pro Bowl as part of the NFC team. Newman finished the season with 50 combined tackles (44 solo), 13 passes defensed, four interceptions, three forced fumbles, and a touchdown in 13 games and 11 starts.

==== 2008 ====
On March 20, 2008, the Dallas Cowboys signed Newman to a six-year, $50.20 million contract that included $22.50 million guaranteed and a signing bonus of $12 million.

Newman entered training camp slated as the No. 1 cornerback, but was unable to participate due to a groin injury. He was replaced by newly-acquired free agent Adam Jones and rookie first round draft pick Mike Jenkins. He was inactive for the Cowboys' season-opening victory in Cleveland. Newman aggravated his groin injury and missed the next five games (Week 5–9). On October 10, Newman underwent sports hernia surgery. He returned in Week 12 and recorded a season-high seven combined tackles, two pass deflections, and an interception during a 14–10 victory in Washington. On December 14, Newman collected six combined tackles, two pass deflections, and intercepted two of Eli Manning's passes in the Cowboys' 20–8 victory over the New York Giants in Week 15. He completed the 2008 season with 37 combined tackles (32 solo), 11 pass deflections, and four interceptions in ten games, all of which he started.

==== 2009 ====
Head coach Wade Phillips retained Newman as the No. 1 starting cornerback to start the 2009 regular season, alongside Mike Jenkins. He started in the Dallas Cowboys' season-opener at the Tampa Bay Buccaneers and recorded a season-high nine combined tackles in their 34–21 victory. On September 28, 2009, Newman collected four combined tackles, two pass deflections, and returned an interception during a 21–7 victory in Week 3. He intercepted a pass by Jake Delhomme and returned for a 27-yard touchdown in the fourth quarter. Newman completed the 2009 season with 57 combined tackles (52 solo), a career-high 18 pass deflections, three interceptions, and a touchdown in 16 games and 16 starts.

The Dallas Cowboys finished atop The NFC East with an 11–5 record. The Cowboys went on to defeat the Philadelphia Eagles 24–17 in the NFC Wildcard Game and reached the NFC Divisional Round. On January 17, 2010, Newman started in the NFC Divisional Round and recorded eight combined tackles during a 34–3 loss at the Minnesota Vikings. On January 20, 2010, Newman was named to the 2010 Pro Bowl after Dominique Rodgers-Cromartie sustained an injury.

==== 2010 ====
Newman and Jenkins returned as the starting cornerbacks to begin the 2010 season. On October 25, 2010, Newman made six solo tackles, two pass deflections, and an interception during a 41–35 loss at the New York Giants in Week 5. He intercepted a pass by Eli Manning and sustained a rib injury during the 30-yard return. He reportedly played through the injury for the remainder of the season. On November 9, 2010, the Dallas Cowboys fired head coach Wade Phillips after they fell to a 1–7 record. Offensive coordinator Jason Garrett was named the interim head coach for the remainder of the season. On November 25, 2010, Newman recorded a season-high eight solo tackles and a pass deflection in the Cowboys' 30–27 loss to the New Orleans Saints in Week 12. In Week 17, Newman made six solo tackles, two pass deflections, and intercepted two pass attempts by quarterback Kevin Kolb during a 14–13 victory at the Philadelphia Eagles. He finished the season with a career-high 79 combined tackles (77 solo), nine pass deflections, and a career-high five interceptions in 16 games and 16 starts. Pro Football Focus ranked him 86th among 100 qualifying cornerbacks in 2010.

==== 2011 ====
On August 3, 2011, Newman sustained a groin injury during practice and was forced to miss the entire preseason and first two regular season games (Weeks 1–2). Due to his injury, head coach Jason Garrett named Mike Jenkins and Orlando Scandrick the starting cornerbacks to begin the regular season. In Week 8, Newman recorded a season-high six solo tackles during a 34–7 loss to the Philadelphia Eagles. On November 13, 2011, Newman made three combined tackles, two pass deflections, intercepted two passes by Ryan Fitzpatrick, and returned one for a touchdown in the Cowboys' 44–7 victory against the Buffalo Bills in Week 10. He completed the 2011 season with 53 combined tackles (45 solo), 11 pass deflections, three interceptions, and a touchdown in 14 games and 14 starts. Newman was ranked 97th among the 109 qualifying cornerbacks in 2011 by Pro Football Focus.

==== 2012 ====
On March 13, 2012, the Dallas Cowboys released Newman in a salary cap related decision that freed up $4 to $6 million in cap space.

=== Cincinnati Bengals ===
On April 11, 2012, the Cincinnati Bengals signed Newman to a one-year, $825,000 contract with $150,000 guaranteed. The signing reunited him with former Cowboys defensive coordinator Mike Zimmer, who he played under from 2003–2006.

Throughout training camp, he competed for a job as a starting cornerback against Leon Hall, Jason Allen, Dre Kirkpatrick, Nate Clements, and Adam Jones. All six players were former first round picks from 2001 to 2012. Head coach Marvin Lewis named Newman the third cornerback on the depth chart and first-team nickelback to begin the season, behind Leon Hall and Nate Clements.

On September 16, 2012, Newman collected a season-high ten combined tackles (eight solo) during a 34–27 win against the Cleveland Browns in Week 2. In Week 6, he tied his season-high of ten combined tackles (seven solo) in the Bengals' 34–24 loss at the Cleveland Browns. On November 4, 2012, Newman made four combined tackles, a season-high four pass deflections, and intercepted two passes by Peyton Manning during a 31–23 loss to the Denver Broncos in Week 9. He was inactive for the Bengals' Week 17 victory against the Baltimore Ravens due to a groin injury. Newman finished the 2012 season with 75 tackles (53 solo), ten passes defensed (led the team), two interceptions, a forced fumble, and two fumble recoveries in 15 games and 15 starts.

==== 2013 ====
Newman became an unrestricted free agent after having a productive season in 2012 and attended a private meeting with the Oakland Raiders where he received a contract offer. On April 1, 2013, the Cincinnati Bengals re-signed Newman to a two-year, $5 million contract with $1.40 million guaranteed.

Newman entered training camp slated as a starting cornerback after the Bengals opted to not re-sign Nate Clements. Head coach Marvin Lewis officially named Newman and Leon Hall the starting cornerbacks to begin the regular season, ahead of Dre Kirkpatrick and Adam Jones. In Week 3, Newman recorded a season-high six solo tackles, a pass deflection, and an interception during a 34–30 victory against the Green Bay Packers. He was inactive for three games (Weeks 15–17) after spraining his MCL in Week 14. He completed the season with 52 combined tackles (45 solo), 11 pass deflections, and two interceptions in 13 games and 13 starts.

==== 2014 ====
Newman entered camp slated as a starting cornerback, but saw minor competition for his job from Adam Jones, Dre Kirkpatrick, and 2014 first round draft pick Darqueze Dennard. Head coach Marvin Lewis opted to retain Newman and Leon Hall as the starting cornerbacks to begin the 2014 regular season.

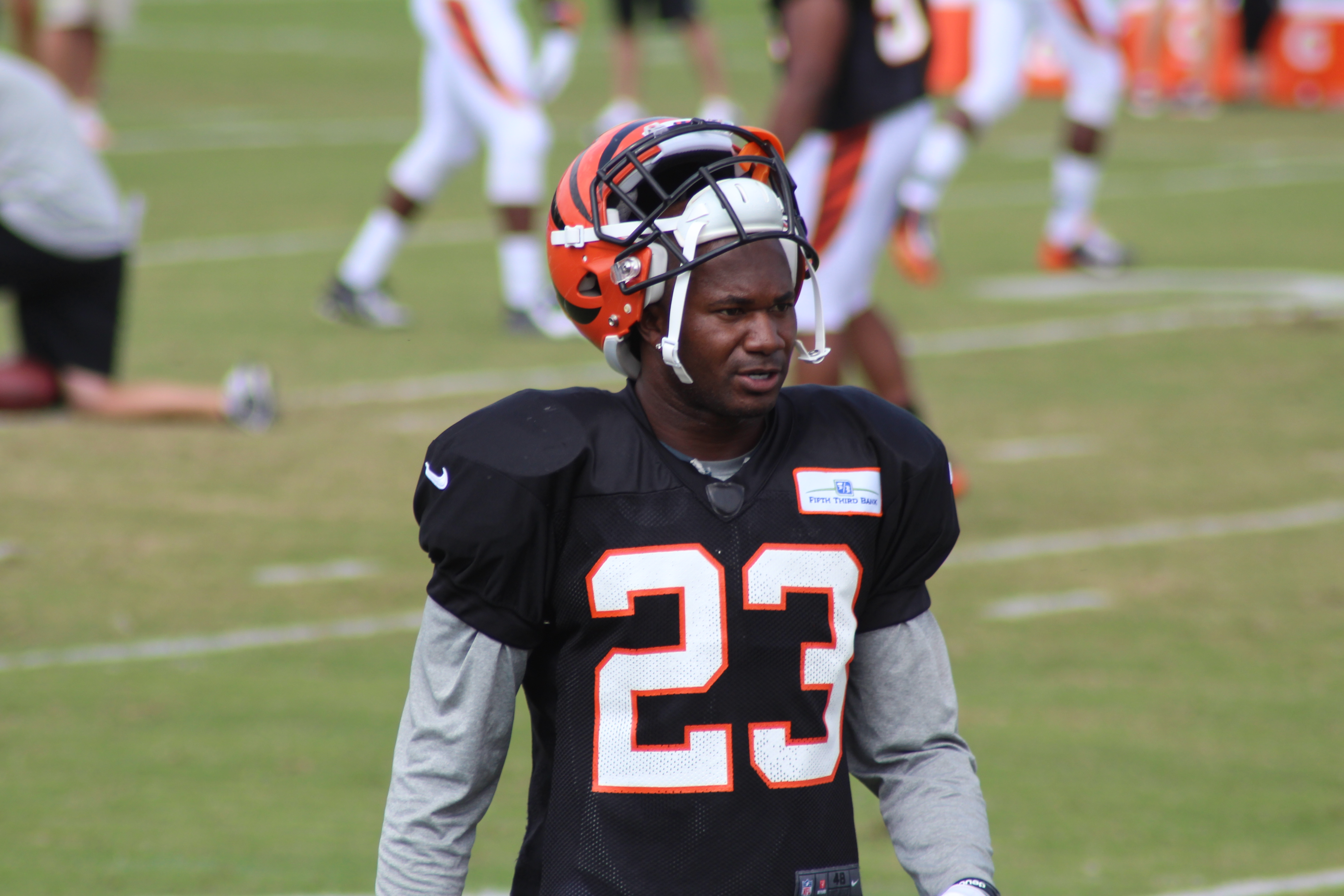
Newman at training camp with the Bengals in 2014

In Week 2, Newman collected a season-high 11 combined tackles (eight solo) and three pass deflections during a 24–10 victory against the Atlanta Falcons. In Week 10, he made five combined tackles before exiting in the third quarter of the Bengals' 24–3 loss to the Cleveland Browns. Newman injured his chest during the game and was inactive for the Bengals' Week 11 victory at the Cleveland Browns. Newman was also sidelined for the Bengals' Week 15 victory at the New Orleans Saints. He started in Week 16, but went on to be sidelined for a Week 17 loss at the Pittsburgh Steelers during their season finale. He completed the 2014 season with 72 combined tackles (48 solo), 14 pass deflections, and an interception in 13 games and 13 starts. Newman earned the 56th highest overall grade among 108 qualified cornerbacks from Pro Football Focus in 2014.

The Cincinnati Bengals finished second in the AFC North with a 10–5–1 record and clinched a wildcard berth. On January 4, 2015, Newman started in the AFC Wildcard Game and recorded three solo tackles and a pass deflection during a 26–10 loss to the Indianapolis Colts. This was his last appearance with the Cincinnati Bengals.

=== Minnesota Vikings ===
On March 27, 2015, the Minnesota Vikings signed Newman to a one-year, $2.50 million contract with $750,000 guaranteed. He selected to join the Vikings and reunite with head coach Mike Zimmer. Newman played under Zimmer with three different teams, including the Dallas Cowboys (2003–2006), Cincinnati Bengals (2012–2014), and Minnesota Vikings.

Throughout training camp, Newman competed for a job as a starting cornerback against Captain Munnerlyn and 2015 rookie first round pick Trae Waynes. Head coach Mike Zimmer named Newman a starting cornerback to begin the regular season, along with Xavier Rhodes.

Newman made his Minnesota Vikings' regular season debut in their season-opener at the San Francisco 49ers and recorded seven solo tackles in their 20–3 loss. On November 15, 2015, Newman recorded four combined tackles, a career-high five pass deflections, and made two interceptions during a 30–14 victory at the Oakland Raiders in Week 10. He intercepted his second pass of the day off a touchdown pass attempt by quarterback Derek Carr that was originally intended for wide receiver Andre Holmes in the endzone and secured it for a touchback in the fourth quarter as the Vikings led 23–14. The pick sealed their victory and earned him the NFC Defensive Player of the Week award. Newman also earned the distinction of being the second player in league history to have multiple interceptions in a single game after the age of 37. Newman finished the 2015 season with 62 combined tackles (52 solo), 12 passes defensed, and three interceptions in 16 games and 16 starts.

==== 2016 ====
On March 18, 2016, the Minnesota Vikings signed Newman to a $2.50 million contract with $1.10 million guaranteed.

During training camp, Newman competed against Trae Waynes to keep his role as a starting cornerback. Defensive coordinator George Edwards retained Newman and Xavier Rhodes as the starting cornerback duo to begin the regular season. Waynes filled in at starter for the first two games due to a knee injury to Xavier Rhodes. Newman became the second oldest active defensive player in the league in 2016 after the retirement of Charles Woodson during the offseason. The only defensive player in the league older than Newman was Pittsburgh Steelers' linebacker James Harrison who was four months older. He started in the Minnesota Vikings' season-opener at the Tennessee Titans and recorded a season-high seven combined tackles during a 25–16 victory. In Week 10, Newman began rotating with Trae Waynes and started in two of the last seven games. Newman was inactive for the Vikings' Week 12 loss at the Detroit Lions after injuring his neck the previous week. He ended the 2016 season with 38 combined tackles (33 solo), eight passes defended, and an interception in 15 games and ten starts He earned an overall grade of 86.4 and was ranked ninth among qualified cornerbacks from Pro Football Focus in 2016.

==== 2017 ====
On March 15, 2017, the Minnesota Vikings re-signed Newman to a one-year, $3.25 million contract that includes $1.50 guaranteed and a signing bonus of $500,000.

During training camp, Newman competed against Mackensie Alexander to be the first-team nickelback after it was left vacant due to the departure of Captain Munnerlyn. Head coach Mike Zimmer named Newman the third cornerback on the depth chart and first-team nickelback to begin the season, behind Xavier Rhodes and Trae Waynes. On October 15, 2017, Newman recorded a season-high five combined tackles during a 23–10 win against the Green Bay Packers in Week 6. In Week 15, he made a solo tackle, a season-high two pass deflections, and an interception during a 34–7 win against the Cincinnati Bengals. He finished his 2017 campaign with 35 combined tackles (25 solo), five passes defended, and an interception in 16 games and seven starts.

The Minnesota Vikings finished atop the NFC North with a 13–3 record, clinching a first round bye and home-field advantage. They reached the NFC Championship Game after defeating the New Orleans Saints 29–24 in the NFC Divisional Round. On January 21, 2018, Newman started in the NFC Championship Game and record four solo tackles in the Vikings' 38–7 loss to the Philadelphia Eagles.

==== 2018 ====
On April 30, 2018, the Minnesota Vikings signed Newman to a one-year, $1.10 million contract.

On September 1, 2018, Newman announced his retirement from the NFL, and immediately joined the Vikings coaching staff.

The Vikings waived Newman from their reserve/retired list on January 7, 2020, and worked him out later that week. He was not signed to a contract.

== NFL career statistics ==
=== Regular season ===
| Year | Team | Games | | Tackles | | | | Fumbles | | | Interceptions | | | | | |
| Year | Team | GP | GS | Cmb | Solo | Ast | Sck | FF | FR | Yds | Int | Yds | Avg | Lng | TD | PD |
|---|---|---|---|---|---|---|---|---|---|---|---|---|---|---|---|---|
| 2003 | DAL | 16 | 16 | 76 | 66 | 10 | 1.0 | 0 | 1 | 0 | 4 | 23 | 5.8 | 25 | 0 | 21 |
| 2004 | DAL | 16 | 16 | 68 | 64 | 4 | 0.0 | 2 | 0 | 0 | 4 | 31 | 7.8 | 21 | 0 | 15 |
| 2005 | DAL | 16 | 16 | 59 | 56 | 3 | 1.0 | 1 | 1 | 0 | 3 | 16 | 5.3 | 12 | 0 | 17 |
| 2006 | DAL | 16 | 16 | 63 | 53 | 10 | 0.0 | 0 | 0 | 0 | 1 | 12 | 12.0 | 12 | 0 | 12 |
| 2007 | DAL | 13 | 11 | 50 | 44 | 6 | 0.0 | 1 | 0 | 0 | 4 | 129 | 32.2 | 70 | 1 | 13 |
| 2008 | DAL | 10 | 10 | 37 | 32 | 5 | 0.0 | 0 | 1 | 0 | 4 | 2 | 0.5 | 2 | 0 | 11 |
| 2009 | DAL | 16 | 16 | 57 | 52 | 5 | 0.0 | 3 | 0 | 0 | 3 | 36 | 12.0 | 27 | 1 | 18 |
| 2010 | DAL | 16 | 16 | 79 | 77 | 2 | 0.0 | 0 | 1 | 1 | 5 | 16 | 3.2 | 30 | 0 | 9 |
| 2011 | DAL | 14 | 14 | 53 | 45 | 8 | 0.0 | 0 | 1 | 7 | 4 | 80 | 20.0 | 43 | 1 | 8 |
| 2012 | CIN | 15 | 15 | 75 | 53 | 22 | 0.0 | 0 | 2 | 8 | 2 | 0 | 0.0 | 0 | 0 | 10 |
| 2013 | CIN | 13 | 13 | 52 | 45 | 7 | 0.0 | 0 | 1 | 58 | 2 | 8 | 4.0 | 9 | 0 | 11 |
| 2014 | CIN | 13 | 13 | 72 | 48 | 24 | 0.0 | 0 | 0 | 0 | 1 | 3 | 3.0 | 3 | 0 | 14 |
| 2015 | MIN | 16 | 16 | 62 | 52 | 10 | 0.0 | 0 | 0 | 0 | 3 | 4 | 1.3 | 4 | 0 | 12 |
| 2016 | MIN | 15 | 10 | 38 | 33 | 5 | 0.0 | 0 | 0 | 0 | 1 | 0 | 0.0 | 0 | 0 | 8 |
| 2017 | MIN | 16 | 7 | 35 | 25 | 10 | 0.0 | 0 | 0 | 0 | 1 | 3 | 3.0 | 3 | 0 | 5 |
| Career | | 221 | 205 | 876 | 745 | 131 | 2.0 | 6 | 11 | 74 | 42 | 363 | 8.6 | 70 | 3 | 184 |

=== NFL records ===
- One of two cornerbacks to have 2 INT's in a single game at the age of 37: Deion Sanders, 2004

== Coaching career ==
On September 1, 2018, Newman retired from football to join the Vikings coaching staff. In 2020 he worked out for the Vikings, eyeing a possible comeback as a player, but was not signed.
