= Mackensie Alexander =

American football player (born 1993)

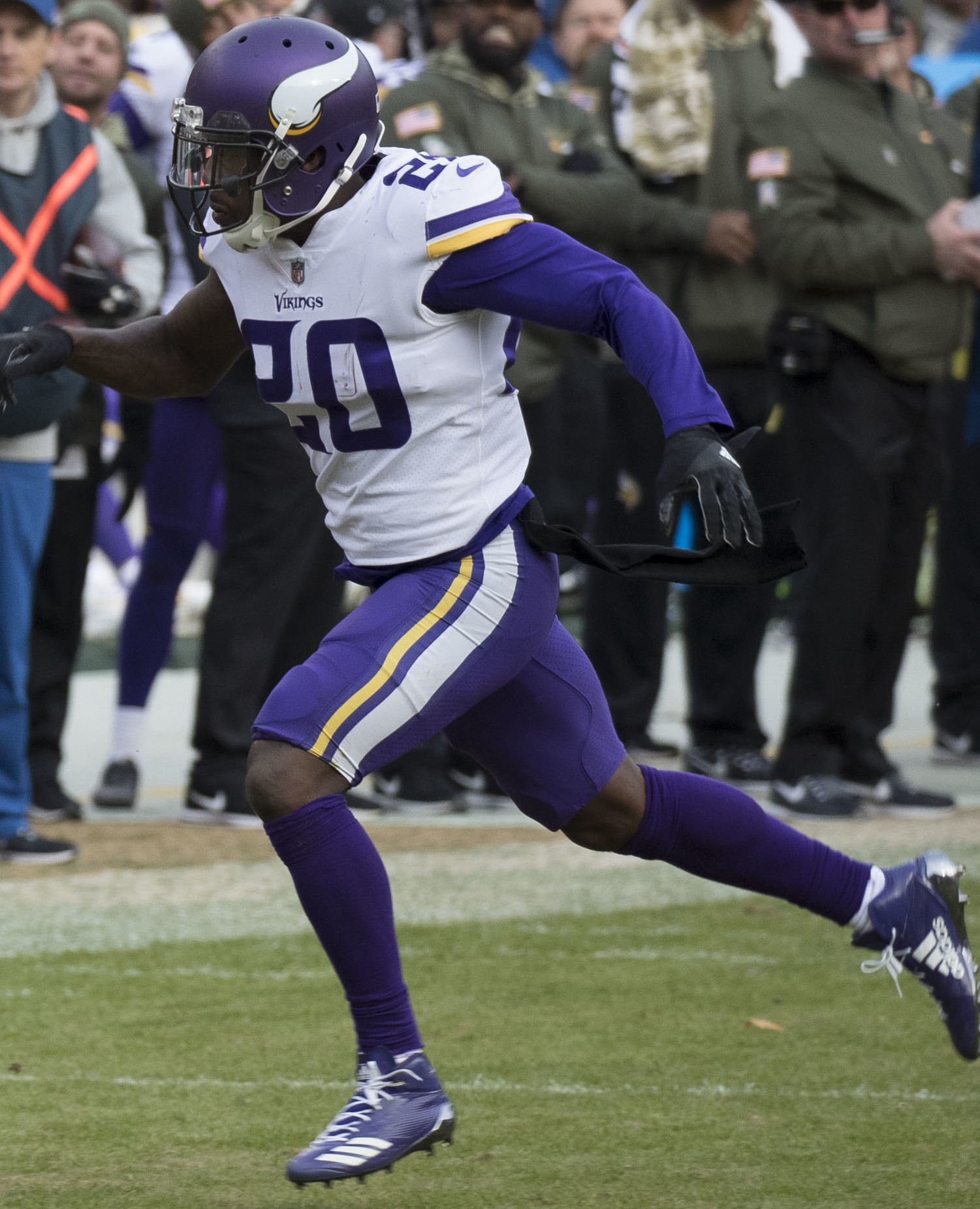
- Alexander with the Minnesota Vikings in 2017

No. 20, 21, 24, 34, 36
- Position: Cornerback

Personal information
- Born: November 12, 1993 (age 33); Naples, Florida, U.S.
- Listed height: 5 ft 10 in (1.78 m)
- Listed weight: 192 lb (87 kg)

Career information
- High school: Immokalee (Immokalee, Florida)
- College: Clemson (2013–2015)
- NFL draft: 2016: 2nd round, 54th overall pick

Career history
- Minnesota Vikings (2016–2019); Cincinnati Bengals (2020); Minnesota Vikings (2021); Miami Dolphins (2022)*; Dallas Cowboys (2022)*
- * Offseason or practice squad member only

Awards and highlights
- Third-team All-American (2015); Freshman All-American (2014); First-team All-ACC (2015)

Career NFL statistics
- Total tackles: 202
- Sacks: 4.5
- Pass deflections: 32
- Interceptions: 3
- Stats at Pro Football Reference

Mackensie Alexander (born November 12, 1993) is an American former professional football player who was a cornerback in the National Football League (NFL). He played college football for the Clemson Tigers. After redshirting his freshman season, he became a key role player on the Tigers' defense his second season, earning Freshman All-American honors. Entering his sophomore season, he was a key part of the Tigers' defense, which was ranked among the best in all of college football. Alexander was selected by the Minnesota Vikings in the second round of the 2016 NFL draft. He has also played for the Cincinnati Bengals.

== Early life ==
Alexander was born along with his identical twin brother Mackenro in Naples, Florida, to Haitian parents Jean and Marie Alexandre (their children's surname is spelled differently than theirs). He attended Immokalee High School. As a senior in 2012, he compiled 42 tackles and three interceptions, helping lead the Indians to an 11–4 mark and a berth in the Florida 5A title game, which they lost, 21–20, to Tallahassee Godby. He was an all-state selection as a senior in 2012 after he had 51 tackles, four interceptions, caused two fumbles and recovered one. During his career with the Indians, Alexander totalled 139 tackles and 10 interceptions. Following his senior season, he was selected to play in the U.S. Army All-American Bowl in San Antonio, Texas.

In addition to football, Alexander also wrestled for the Indians and ran track. In wrestling, he was ranked 11th in the state of Florida in his weight class as a senior. In track & field, he competed as a sprinter and owned a personal-best time of 10.8 seconds in the 100-meter dash. For the outdoor team in 2012, he ran a career-best time of 50.39 seconds in the 400-meter dash on his way to a first-place finish at the Collier County Athletic Championships. As a senior in 2012, he took gold in the 200-meter dash with a time of 22.44 seconds at the Bear Run Invitational.

Regarded as a four-star recruit by Rivals.com, Alexander was viewed as the 7th best defensive back prospect in the nation, the 8th best player in the state of Florida and the 42nd best recruit in the nation. He was rated by ESPN as a five-star recruit and was rated as the fourth best overall player in the nation, as well as the second best defensive back in the nation and the No. 2 player in Florida. Scout.com described Alexander as "an ultra confident, big-mouthed player that wants to shut down no. 1 wide receivers and is capable of understanding the mental game better than any other prospect in his class". Alexander committed to Clemson University to play college football in National Signing Day, becoming one of the most highly sought-after recruits in Clemson history and the highest-ranked Tiger signee since Da'Quan Bowers was No. 1 in the class of 2008.

College recruiting
Name	Hometown	School	Height	Weight	40^{‡}	Commit date
Mackensie Alexander; CB	Immokalee, Florida	Immokalee High School	5 ft 11 in (1.80 m)	175 lb (79 kg)	4.5	Nov 9, 2012
Mackensie Alexander; CB	Recruit ratings: Scout: Rivals:					
Overall recruit ranking: Scout: 7 (CB); 71 (national) Rivals: 7 (CB); 8 (FL); 42 (national)
‡ Refers to 40-yard dash; Note: In many cases, Scout, Rivals, 247Sports, On3, and ESPN may conflict in their listings of height, weight and 40 time.; In these cases, the average was taken. ESPN grades are on a 100-point scale.; Sources: "2013 Clemson Football Commitment List". Rivals.; "2013 Clemson College Football Team Recruiting Prospects". Scout.; "Scout.com Team Recruiting Rankings". Scout.; "2013 Team Ranking". Rivals.com.

== College career ==
Initially slated to be in the mix in 2013, Alexander suffered a groin injury in the preseason and therefore was granted a medical red-shirt. Once Alexander got on the field, opponents found out why he was rated so highly coming out of high school. In 2014, he was named Freshman All-American and received honorable mention All-Atlantic Coast Conference (ACC) honors as a full-time starter. As a redshirt sophomore in 2015, he earned third-team All-American and first-team All-Conference honors. He finished his collegiate career at Clemson with 44 total tackles (33 solo), 4 of them for loss of yards, 11 pass deflections and one fumble recovery.

=== Freshman season (2014) ===
As the first (redshirt) freshman cornerback to start all 13 games for the Tigers, Alexander posted 21 tackles, two of them for loss, batted down six passes and recovered one fumble in 766 snaps, which were the most snaps in school history by a freshman and the tenth most in school history by a cornerback. Opposing team's quarterbacks threw a total of 57 passes at receivers covered by Alexander, and just 20 of them were completed, with two touchdowns, none of them over the final nine games of the season. For his outstanding season efforts, Alexander was named Freshman All-American and earned honorable mention All-ACC honors.

=== Sophomore season (2015) ===
Alexander returned as a starter in 2015. In the preseason, Alexander was named to the Bednarik and Thorpe Award watch lists, as well as to the preseason third-team All-American by Athlon. Alexander had a stellar season for a Tigers team that went 14–1 and made it to the National Championship game in Phoenix, Arizona, earning All-ACC honors after shutting down every receiver he faced. He didn't give up a single 100-yard receiver or a passing touchdown during the season. He injured his hamstring against Oklahoma in the College Football Playoff Semifinal and tried to play through the injury against Alabama, but he aggravated it in the first half and didn't return.

On January 13, 2016, Alexander announced that he would forgo the rest of his eligibility in college and declare for the upcoming NFL draft. "It was a tough decision, very difficult," Alexander said. "I enjoyed my college experience. It was fun and something I've been really enjoying, competing with my friend, my brothers. You grow a bond in college. This was definitely something I've been enjoying. We've had great coaching. I talked to my parents. I've had a great career and I want to keep getting better and chase greatness. I feel I did everything I could in college. I made a bunch of plays to help my team."

=== Statistics ===
Regular season statistics				Tackles					Interceptions						Fumbles		
Season	Team	GP	GS	Comb	Total	Ast	Sck	Tfl	PDef	Int	Yds	Avg	Lng	TDs	FF	FR	FR YDS
2014	Clemson	10	10	21	15	6	0.0	2.0	6	0	0	0.0	0	0	0	1	0
2015	Clemson	13	13	23	18	5	0.0	2.0	5	0	0	0.0	0	0	0	0	0
Totals		23	23	44	33	11	0.0	4.0	11	0	0	0.0	0	0	0	1	0

== Professional career ==
=== Pre-draft ===
On January 13, 2016, Alexander announced his decision to forgo his remaining eligibility and enter the 2016 NFL draft. Alexander attended the NFL Scouting Combine in Indianapolis, but did not perform the majority of combine drills due to a hamstring injury. Alexander performed 11 reps on the bench press at the combine and met with team representatives and scouts. On March 10, 2016, Alexander participated at Clemson's pro day and was one of multiple highly valued prospects to perform for scouts and team representatives. Four NFL head coaches attended, including Marvin Lewis (Cincinnati Bengals), Chuck Pagano (Indianapolis Colts), Rex Ryan (Buffalo Bills), and Mike Tomlin (Pittsburgh Steelers).

External videos
- Alexander "I'm the best corner in this draft!"
- Alexander's NFL Combine workout

Alexander attended pre-draft visits with the Steelers, New York Jets, New Orleans Saints, Tennessee Titans, Colts, Detroit Lions, San Diego Chargers, and Los Angeles Rams. He also had a private workout with the Carolina Panthers and Minnesota Vikings. At the conclusion of the pre-draft process, Alexander was projected to be a late first round or second round pick by NFL draft experts and scouts. He was ranked as the third best cornerback prospect in the draft by Sports Illustrated, was ranked the third best cornerback by DraftScout.com, and was ranked the seventh best cornerback by NFL analyst Mike Mayock.

Pre-draft measurables
Height	Weight	Arm length	Hand span	40-yard dash	10-yard split	20-yard split	20-yard shuttle	Three-cone drill	Vertical jump	Broad jump	Bench press
5 ft 10 3/8 in (1.79 m)	190 lb (86 kg)	31 3/8 in (0.80 m)	9 1/8 in (0.23 m)	4.47 s	1.56 s	2.63 s	4.21 s	7.18 s	37 1/2 in (0.95 m)	10 ft 1 in (3.07 m)	11 reps
All values from Clemson's Pro Day /NFL Combine

=== Minnesota Vikings (first stint) ===
==== 2016 ====
The Vikings selected Alexander in the second round with the 54th overall pick in the 2016 NFL draft. Alexander was the seventh cornerback drafted in 2016. Mike Renner of Pro Football Focus (PFF) ranked the Vikings' selection of Alexander as the fifth best in the 2016 NFL draft.

External videos
- Vikings draft Mackensie Alexander 54th overall

On May 5, 2016, the Vikings signed Alexander to a four-year, $4.31 million contract that includes $1.98 million guaranteed and a signing bonus of $1.33 million.

Alexander joined a deep cornerback group that included Xavier Rhodes, Terence Newman, Trae Waynes, and Captain Munnerlyn. Throughout training camp, he competed to be the first-team nickelback against Munnerlyn. Head coach Mike Zimmer named Alexander the fifth cornerback on the Vikings' depth chart to begin the regular season, behind Rhodes, Newman, Munnerlyn, and Waynes.

He made his professional regular season debut in the Vikings' season-opening 25–16 victory at the Titans. In Week 10, Alexander collected a season-high three combined tackles during a 26–20 loss at the Washington Redskins. Alexander was inactive for the Vikings' Week 13 loss against the Dallas Cowboys due to a groin injury. On December 23, 2016, the Vikings placed Alexander on injured reserve due to an abdominal injury. He finished his rookie season in 2016 with five combined tackles (three solo) in 13 games and zero starts and primarily played on special teams.

==== 2017 ====
Alexander entered training camp slated as the first-team nickelback after Captain Munnerlyn departed for the Panthers during free agency. Head coach Mike Zimmer named Alexander the first-team nickelback to begin the regular season. He was also named the fourth cornerback on the depth chart behind Xavier Rhodes, Trae Waynes, and Terence Newman.

Alexander was inactive for the Vikings' Week 7 win against the Baltimore Ravens due to a hip injury. On November 12, 2017, Alexander recorded a season-high three solo tackles, two pass deflections, and made his first career interception during a 38–30 victory at the Redskins in Week 10. Alexander made his first career interception off a pass by Redskins' quarterback Kirk Cousins, that was originally intended for wide receiver Jamison Crowder, and returned it for a ten-yard gain in the second quarter. He was also sidelined during a Week 15 victory against the Cincinnati Bengals due to a rib injury. He finished the season with 17 combined tackles (13 solo), six pass deflections, and one interception in 14 games and zero starts.

The Vikings finished first in the NFC North with a 13–3 record and earned a first round bye. On January 14, 2018, Alexander appeared in his first career playoff game and made one tackle and one pass deflection during a 29–24 victory against the Saints in the NFC Divisional Round. The following week, the Vikings were eliminated from the playoffs after a 38–7 loss at the Philadelphia Eagles who were the eventual Super Bowl LII Champions.

==== 2018 ====
Alexander returned as the first-team nickelback under third-year defensive coordinator George Edwards. Alexander was inactive for the Vikings' season-opening victory against the San Francisco 49ers after injuring his ankle in the second preseason game. On September 16, 2018, Alexander earned his first career start and collected a season-high seven solo tackles and made his first career sack during a 29–29 tie at the Green Bay Packers in Week 2. Alexander sacked Packers quarterback Aaron Rodgers for a seven-yard loss during overtime.

==== 2019 ====
Alexander entered the 2019 season as the Vikings slot cornerback. He played in 13 games with four starts, recording 38 tackles, 0.5 sacks, five passes defensed and an interception. He was placed on injured reserve on January 10, 2020.

=== Cincinnati Bengals ===
On March 30, 2020, Alexander signed a one-year, $4 million contract with the Cincinnati Bengals.

On August 26, 2020, Alexander was arrested in Florida, while searching for his missing father. He was charged with battery against the last person to see his father, who was later found unharmed. The charges against Alexander were dropped in January 2021.

Alexander was placed on the reserve/COVID-19 list by the team on November 7, 2020, and was activated on November 11. In Week 15 against the Steelers on Monday Night Football, Alexander recorded his first interception as a Bengal off a pass thrown by Ben Roethlisberger during the 27–17 win.

=== Minnesota Vikings (second stint) ===
On March 29, 2021, Alexander signed with the Minnesota Vikings. He appeared in all 16 games for Minnesota (including five starts).

=== Miami Dolphins ===
On August 15, 2022, Alexander signed with the Miami Dolphins. On August 23, Alexander was placed on injured reserve. On September 1, he was released by Miami with an injury settlement.

=== Dallas Cowboys ===
On December 6, 2022, Alexander was signed to the practice squad of the Dallas Cowboys, to provide depth after cornerback Anthony Brown was lost for the season with a torn Achilles. Alexander was reunited with Clemson teammate and Vikings teammate Jayron Kearse upon signing with the Cowboys. On December 23, he was promoted to the active roster. On January 19, 2023, Alexander was placed on the injured reserve list. On January 30, he was released by the Cowboys.
