= Trae Waynes =

American football player (born 1992)

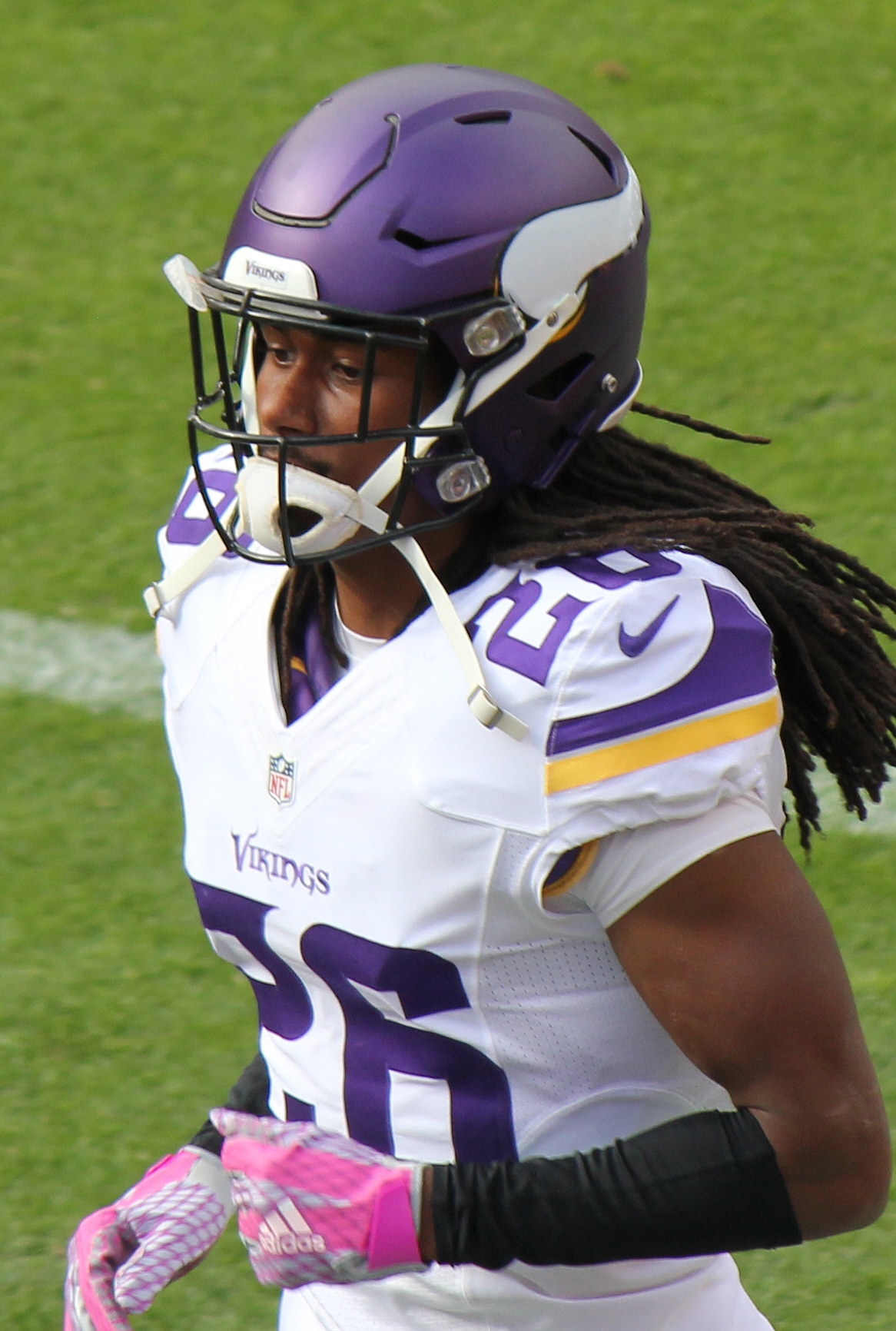
- Waynes with the Minnesota Vikings in 2015

No. 26
- Position: Cornerback

Personal information
- Born: July 25, 1992 (age 34); Kenosha, Wisconsin, U.S.
- Listed height: 6 ft 0 in (1.83 m)
- Listed weight: 190 lb (86 kg)

Career information
- High school: Bradford (Kenosha)
- College: Michigan State (2011–2014)
- NFL draft: 2015: 1st round, 11th overall pick

Career history
- Minnesota Vikings (2015–2019); Cincinnati Bengals (2020–2021)

Awards and highlights
- First-team All-Big Ten (2014)

Career NFL statistics
- Total tackles: 259
- Sacks: 1.0
- Pass deflections: 43
- Interceptions: 7
- Forced fumbles: 2
- Fumble recoveries: 1
- Stats at Pro Football Reference

Trae Waynes (born July 25, 1992) is an American former professional football player who was a cornerback in the National Football League (NFL). He played college football for the Michigan State Spartans. He was selected by the Minnesota Vikings in the first round, 11th overall of the 2015 NFL draft. He also spent time with the Cincinnati Bengals.

== Early life ==
Waynes attended Harborside Academy but played for Mary D. Bradford High School in Kenosha, Wisconsin, because Harborside Academy doesn't have sports where he was teammate and best friend of running back Melvin Gordon, who would eventually be selected four spots after Waynes in the 2015 NFL draft. At Bradford, Waynes was a multi-sport athlete in football, baseball and track. In football, Waynes was named first-team All-Southeast Conference as a junior in 2010. As a senior, he broke his fibula and tore ligaments in his ankle, but still managed to record 38 tackles, two interceptions and four pass break-ups, earning first-team All-state and All-region selections by the Wisconsin Football Coaches Association. In baseball, Waynes earned first-team All-county honors as an outfielder as a junior in 2010 after leading the Red Devils in home runs (3) and finishing second in batting average (.452, 28-of-62). In addition, he also produced eight doubles and three triples while being caught stealing only once in 26 attempts.

Waynes was also a standout track & field athlete. In 2010, he won the county indoor track championship in the 60-yard and 220-yard dashes and recorded the fastest 40-yard dash time (4.37 s) at the Midwest Ultimate 100 Camp. In 2011, he finished third in the 100m (10.85 s) at the Division I State T&F Championships, and recorded a career-best time of 10.75 seconds in the 100-meter dash at the SEC Outdoor Conference Meet, where he placed first. He also contributed as a member of the 4 × 100m and 4 × 200-meter relay squads, with bests of 42.26 seconds and 1:28.98 minutes.

Considered a three-star recruit by ESPN.com, Waynes was listed as the No. 94 safety in the nation in 2011. He was rated the No. 72 cornerback and No. 94 safety in the nation by Scouts Inc. He was listed among the Midwest's top prospects by SuperPrep at No. 67. He was also rated among Wisconsin's top high school seniors by Rivals.com as the No. 14. Waynes chose Michigan State over scholarship offers from Illinois, Iowa State, and Wisconsin, among others.

== College career ==
=== 2011–2013 ===
Waynes attended Michigan State University from 2011 to 2014, where he was a three-year letterwinner and a two-year starter at cornerback. He was redshirted as a true freshman in 2011 after suffering a season-ending injury when he broke his fibula and tore ligaments in his knee as a senior in high school.

As a redshirt freshman in 2012, Waynes earned his first letter as he appeared in nine games, primarily on special teams and as a backup. In the 2012 Buffalo Wild Wings Bowl game against TCU, he played a majority of the snaps at cornerback and tallied a season-high three tackles; he was also credited with a half sack for a loss of 1 yard against the Horned Frogs. Waynes finished his freshman season with 5 tackles, including two solo.

As a redshirt sophomore in 2013, Waynes started all 14 games at field cornerback for the Spartans, recording a career-high 50 tackles (1.5 for loss), five pass deflections and three interceptions. For his season efforts, Waynes was an honorable mention All-Big Ten Conference pick by the coaches and media, was named to the CollegeFootballNews.com All-Sophomore Team (second team) and received MSU's Tommy Love Award (most improved player on defense). In the Spartans 2013 Big Ten Football Championship Game win against No. 2 Ohio State, he was credited with four stops. In the 2014 Rose Bowl game against No. 5 Stanford, he recorded his third interception of the season and tallied three tackles, helping Michigan State win their first Rose Bowl since 1988.

=== 2014 ===
Waynes returned for his junior season in 2014, starting all 13 games at boundary corner. He ranked sixth on the team with 46 tackles, including two tackles-for-loss and one sack for a loss of 4 yards. His career-high eight pass break-ups ranked him second on the team, while his three interceptions were good for a tie at second. In Week 5, he led the secondary in a victory over No. 19 Nebraska as he posted career-highs in interceptions (2), tackles (7) and pass break-ups (2). On September 6, he had a solid game against No. 3 Oregon with four tackles and a pass break-up. He was credited with a career-high two tackles for loss (9 yards), including a 4-yard sack, and a broken-up a pass at Indiana in Week 7. On November 22, he was selected Spartan Defensive Player of the Week after limiting Rutgers' wide receiver Leonte Carroo to just one catch for 6 yards while recording three tackles; Carroo entered the game ranked second in the Big Ten, averaging 93.3 receiving yards per game. In Waynes's final game as a Spartan, he registered three tackles and a pass break-up in the Cotton Bowl Classic win over #4 Baylor.

His junior season honors included being named second-team All-American by Walter Camp Football Foundation, Sporting News and Athlon Sports, third-team All-American from the Associated Press (AP), Phil Steele and SI.com (honorable mention). He was also a first-team All-Big Ten selection by the coaches and the media, becoming MSU's third first-team All-Big Ten cornerback under head coach Mark Dantonio. Waynes was one of 15 semifinalists for the Jim Thorpe Award (nation's top defensive back) and was the defensive recipient of MSU's Jim Adams Award (unsung hero).

Waynes collected 101 tackles, six interceptions and 13 pass deflections in 36 career games with the Spartans, including 27 consecutive starts.

== Professional career ==
=== Pre-draft ===
Following his junior season, Waynes entered the 2015 NFL Draft. Waynes was considered one of the top cornerbacks of the 2015 class, together with Marcus Peters. In most mock drafts, he was projected to be a top 10 pick. Waynes shined at the 2015 NFL Combine, where he posted the top 40-yard dash time among defensive backs and the second fastest overall (4.31 seconds); that time placed him tied for seventh-fastest among cornerbacks at the combine since 2003. He also finished tied for fourth on the bench press with 19 reps. At his Pro Day, he re-tried the 20-yard shuttle and responded with a 4.18 time.

External videos
- Waynes' NFL Combine workout
- Waynes gets drafted by Minnesota

Pre-draft measurables
Height	Weight	Arm length	Hand span	40-yard dash	10-yard split	20-yard split	20-yard shuttle	Three-cone drill	Vertical jump	Broad jump	Bench press
6 ft 0 1/8 in (1.83 m)	186 lb (84 kg)	31 in (0.79 m)	8 1/4 in (0.21 m)	4.31 s	1.53 s	2.55 s	4.18 s	7.06 s	38 in (0.97 m)	10 ft 2 in (3.10 m)	19 reps
All values from NFL Combine, 20-yard shuttle from Pro Day

=== Minnesota Vikings ===
==== 2015 ====
The Minnesota Vikings selected Waynes in the first round (11th overall) of the 2015 NFL draft. Waynes was the first cornerback drafted in 2015 and became the Vikings' highest drafted cornerback in franchise history, surpassing 1994 first round pick (18th overall) Dewayne Washington.

On May 7, 2015, the Vikings signed Waynes to a fully guaranteed four-year, $12.94 million contract that includes a signing bonus of $7.67 million.

Throughout training camp, Waynes competed against Captain Munnerlyn, Terence Newman, and Josh Robinson to be a starting cornerback. Head coach Mike Zimmer named Waynes the fourth cornerback on the depth chart to begin the regular season, behind Xavier Rhodes, Newman, and Munnerlyn.

He made his professional regular season debut in the Vikings' season-opening 20–3 loss at the San Francisco 49ers. In Week 9, he recorded four solo tackles and made a season-high two pass deflections during a 21–18 win against the St. Louis Rams. Waynes was inactive for the Vikings' Week 12 loss at the Atlanta Falcons due to an ankle injury. On December 10, 2015, Waynes earned his first career start as a nickelback after Terence Newman was moved to safety due to multiple injuries. Waynes finished the 23–20 loss at the Arizona Cardinals with a season-high five solo tackles and one pass deflection. Waynes finished his rookie season in 2015 with 30 combined tackles (26 solo) and four pass deflections in 15 games and one start. According to Pioneer Press Vikings beat reporter Chris Tomasson, Waynes was the least-used rookie of Minnesota's 18 first-round picks since 2000, except linebacker Chad Greenway, who missed his 2006 rookie season due to a knee injury.

The Vikings finished first in the NFC North with an 11–5 record and earned a playoff berth. On January 10, 2016, Waynes appeared in his first career playoff game and recorded three combined tackles, made two pass deflections, and an interception as the Vikings lost 10–9 to the Seattle Seahawks in the NFC Wildcard Game. Waynes was thrust into a pivotal pass defense role during the second half after veteran cornerback Terence Newman suffered an ankle injury. On the Seahawks' first series of the third quarter, quarterback Russell Wilson promptly targeted Waynes and attempted a deep pass to rookie wide receiver Tyler Lockett, but it was broken up by Waynes. Five plays later on a fourth-and-three situation, Waynes intercepted Wilson at the Vikings' 22-yard line after the ball was tipped by a Seahawks' tight end.

==== 2016 ====
During training camp, Waynes competed to be a starting cornerback against Newman, Munnerlyn, and rookie Mackensie Alexander. Zimmer named Waynes the third cornerback on the depth chart to start the regular season, behind Rhodes and Terence Newman.

Waynes was inserted as the No. 1 cornerback for the first two regular season games after Rhodes sustained a hamstring injury during pre-game warmups against the Titans. He started in the Vikings' season-opener at the Tennessee Titans and collected a season-high ten solo tackles during their 25–16 victory. The following week, Waynes was moved to nickelback and replaced at outside cornerback by Alexander after drawing consecutive penalties in the third quarter and struggling to cover wide receiver Jordy Nelson. Waynes finished the Vikings' 17–14 win against the Green Bay Packers with four solo tackles, one pass deflection, and an interception. His interception off a pass by Packers' quarterback Aaron Rodgers was the first interception in U.S. Bank Stadium. On December 11, 2016, Waynes recorded one tackle and broke up a pass before exiting in the third quarter of the Vikings' 25–16 win at the Jacksonville Jaguars due to a concussion. The following week, Waynes remained in concussion protocol and was inactive for their Week 15 loss against the Indianapolis Colts. In Week 17, he recorded two solo tackles, made a season-high three pass deflections, and made one interception during a 38–10 victory against the Chicago Bears. He finished the season with 50 combined tackles (42 solo), 11 pass deflections, and three interceptions in 15 games and eight starts.

==== 2017 ====
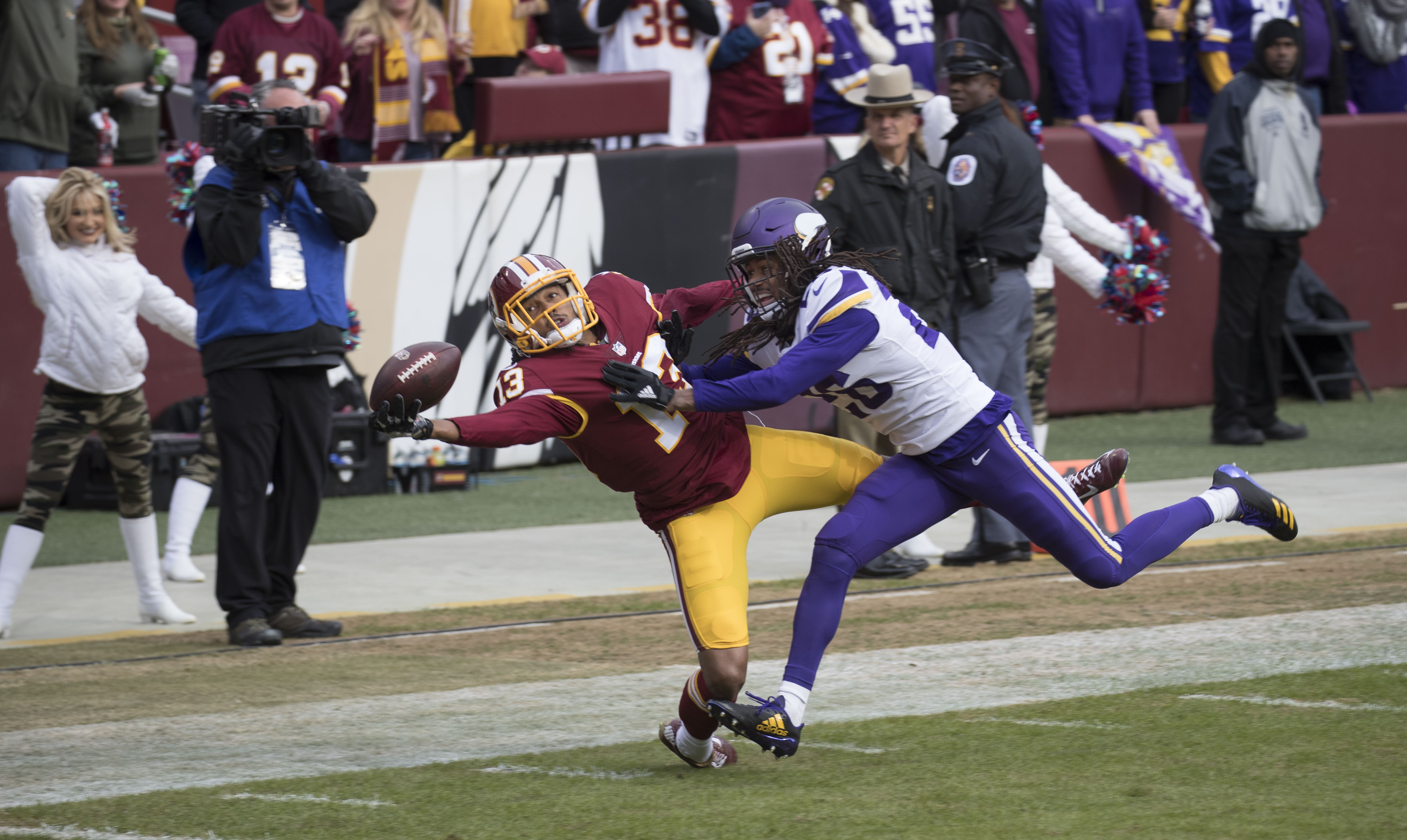
Waynes (right) defending Maurice Harris in 2017

Waynes entered training camp slated as a starting cornerback. Zimmer retained Waynes and Rhodes as the starting cornerback tandem to begin the regular season. He started in the Vikings' season-opener against the New Orleans Saints and collected a season-high 11 combined tackles (nine solo) during a 29–19 victory. On December 23, 2017, Waynes recorded three solo tackles, made a pass deflection, and made his first career sack during a 16–0 win at the Green Bay Packers in Week 16. Waynes sacked Packers' quarterback Brett Hundley for a four-yard loss in the third quarter. Waynes started in all 16 games in 2017 and recorded 65 combined tackles (57 solo), 11 pass deflections, two interceptions, and one sack. Waynes received an overall grade of 79.1 from Pro Football Focus in 2017. His grade was ranked 52nd among all qualifying cornerbacks in 2017.

The Vikings finished the season first in the NFC North with a 13–3 record and earned a first round bye. On January 14, 2018, Waynes started his first career playoff game and recorded four solo tackles and broke up one pass during a 29–24 win against the New Orleans Saints in the NFC Divisional Round. The following week, he made three combined tackles and broke up a pass as the Vikings were eliminated from the playoffs after a 38–7 loss at the Philadelphia Eagles in the NFC Championship Game.

==== 2018 ====
On April 30, 2018, the Vikings exercised the fifth-year, $9.06 million option on Waynes' rookie contract. Defensive coordinator George Edwards retained Waynes and Rhodes as the starting cornerback tandem entering training camp. Zimmer officially named Waynes and Rhodes the starters to begin the regular season, alongside safeties Harrison Smith and Andrew Sendejo.

Waynes was inactive for the Vikings' Week 5 victory at the Eagles after spraining his ankle the previous week. In Week 7, Waynes recorded three combined tackles, made a career-high four pass deflections, and intercepted a pass by Jets' quarterback Sam Darnold during a 37–17 win at the New York Jets.

==== 2019 ====
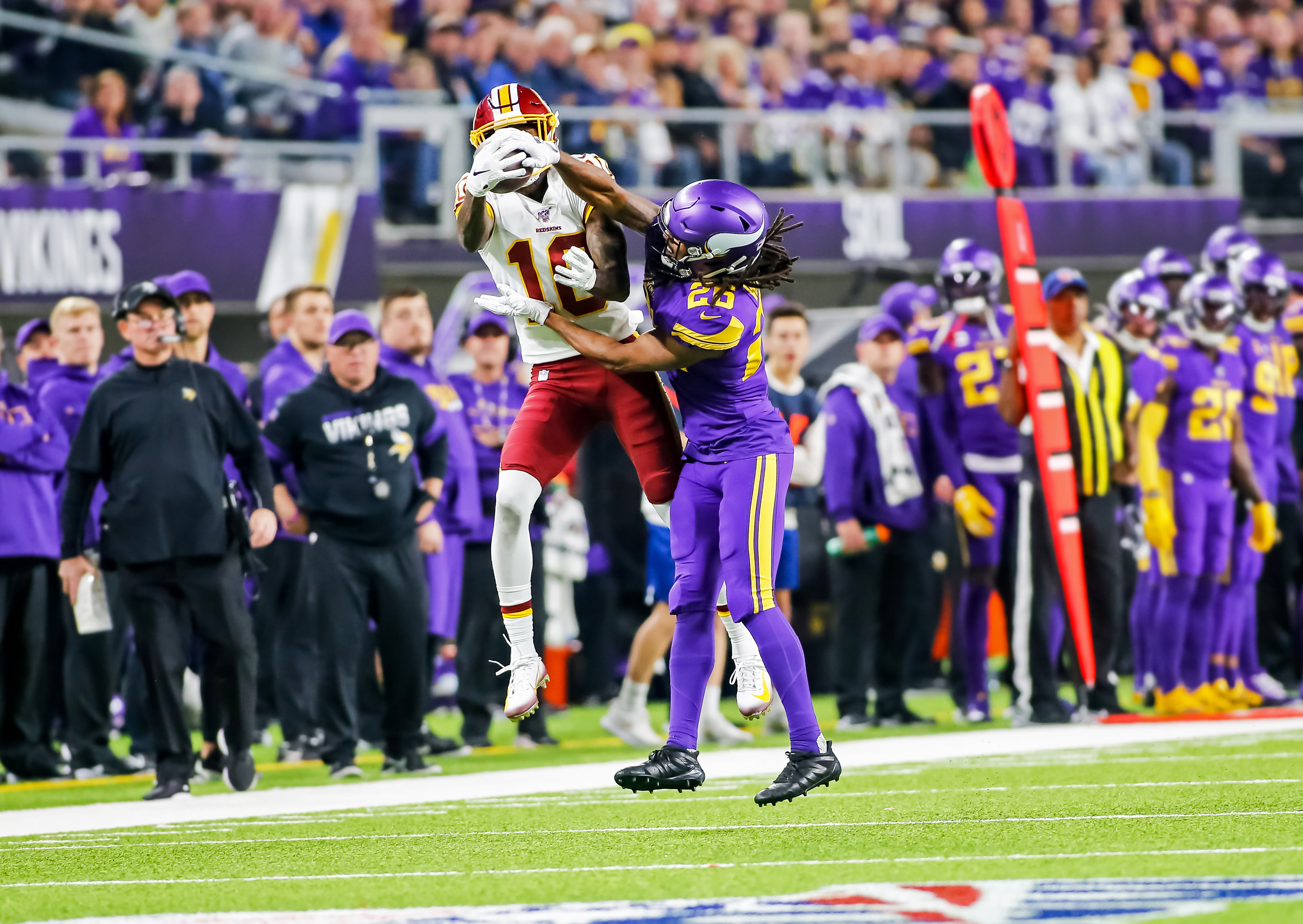
Waynes in a game against the Washington Redskins

In week 7 against the Detroit Lions, Waynes recorded his first interception of the season off Matthew Stafford in the 42–30 win.

=== Cincinnati Bengals ===
On March 27, 2020, Waynes signed a three-year, $42 million contract with the Cincinnati Bengals. On September 7, he was placed on injured reserve with a pectoral injury. He was moved to the reserve/COVID-19 list on November 6, 2020, and activated from the list back to injured reserve on November 18.

After missing the first three games with a hamstring injury, he made his Bengals debut in Week 4 of the 2021 season. He started the next two games before re-injuring the hamstring injury in Week 5. He was placed on injured reserve on October 12. He was activated on December 18. Waynes remained on the roster and active throughout the Bengals' playoff run and in Super Bowl LVI, though only playing very few select special teams snaps.

On March 21, 2022, Waynes was released by the Bengals. In a June 20 interview, Waynes noted that he was no longer interested in continuing his NFL career, saying 'In my head, I'm done.'

== Career statistics ==
=== NFL ===
Year	Team	Games		Tackles				Interceptions						Fumbles		
Year	Team	GP	GS	Cmb	Solo	Ast	Sck	PD	Int	Yds	Avg	Lng	TD	FF	FR	Yds
2015	MIN	15	1	30	26	4	0.0	4	0	0	0.0	0	0	0	0	0
2016	MIN	15	8	50	42	8	0.0	11	3	4	1.3	4	0	0	0	0
2017	MIN	16	16	65	57	8	1.0	11	2	21	10.5	18	0	0	0	0
2018	MIN	14	14	44	34	10	0.0	8	1	24	24.0	24	0	0	0	0
2019	MIN	14	14	58	56	2	0.0	8	1	0	0.0	0	0	2	1	20
2020	CIN	DNP														
2021	CIN	5	4	12	11	1	0.0	1	0	0	0.0	0	0	0	0	0
Totals		79	57	259	226	33	1.0	43	7	49	7.0	24	0	2	1	20

=== College ===
Season	Team	Games		Tackles				Interceptions						Fumbles		
Season	Team	GP	GS	Cmb	Solo	Ast	Sck	PD	Int	Yds	Avg	Lng	TD	FF	FR	Yds
2012	Michigan State	9	1	5	2	3	0.5	0	0	0	0.0	0	0	0	0	0
2013	Michigan State	14	14	50	35	15	2.0	5	3	11	3.7	11	0	0	1	0
2014	Michigan State	12	12	46	34	12	1.5	8	3	0	0.0	0	0	0	1	0
Totals		35	27	101	71	30	4.0	13	6	11	1.8	11	0	0	2	0
