= Mike Zimmer =

American football coach (born 1956)

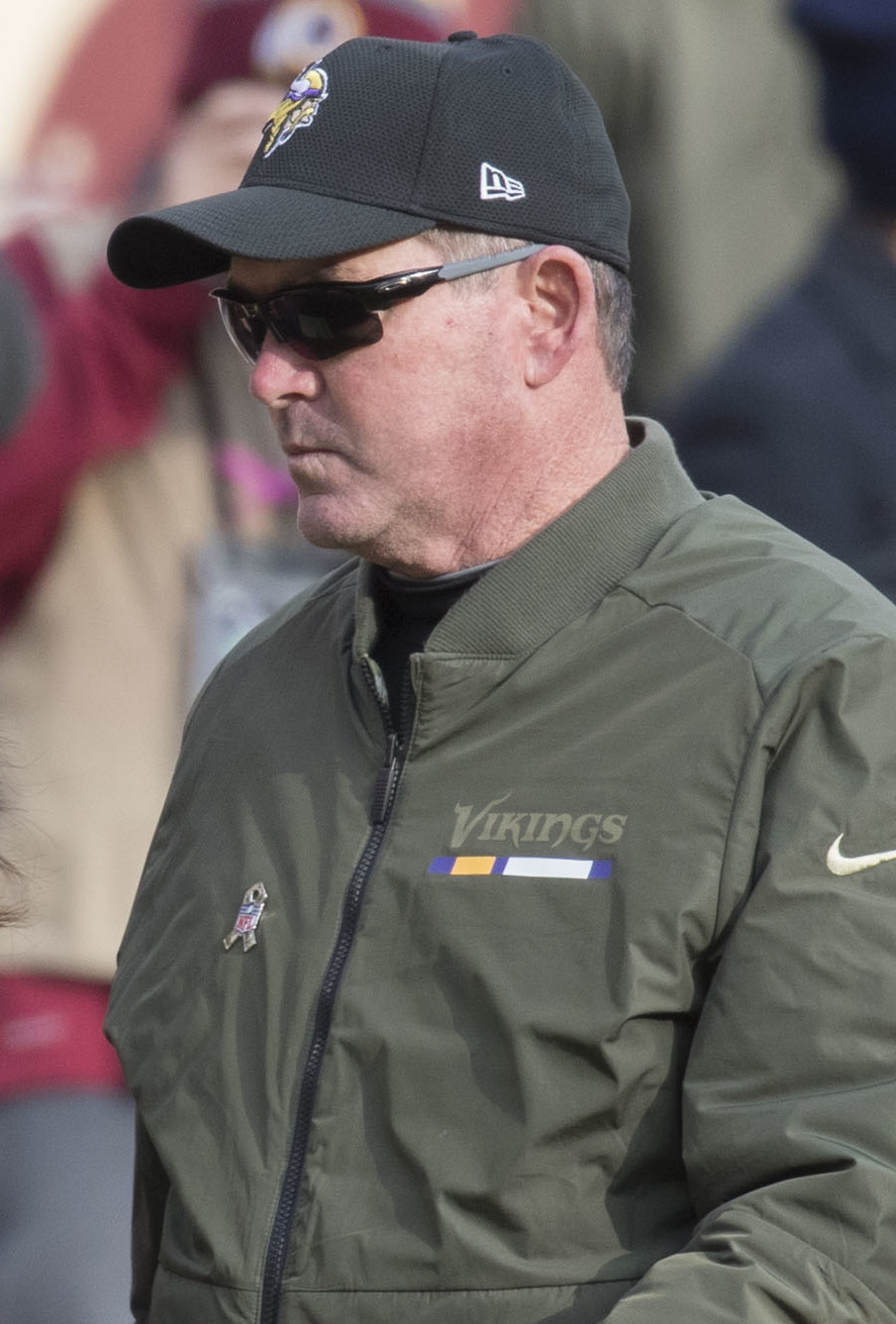
- Zimmer with the Minnesota Vikings in 2017

Personal information
- Born: June 5, 1956 (age 70); Peoria, Illinois, U.S.

Career information
- High school: Lockport Township (Lockport, Illinois)
- College: Illinois State

Career history
- Missouri (1979–1980) Defensive assistant; Weber State (1981–1988); Inside linebackers coach (1981–1984); Defensive backs coach (1985–1988); Washington State (1989–1993) Defensive coordinator; Dallas Cowboys (1994–2006); Defensive assistant/nickel (1994); Defensive backs coach (1995–1999); Defensive coordinator (2000–2006); Atlanta Falcons (2007) Defensive coordinator; Cincinnati Bengals (2008–2013) Defensive coordinator; Minnesota Vikings (2014–2021) Head coach; Jackson State (2022) Analyst/consultant; Colorado (2023) Analyst/consultant; Dallas Cowboys (2024) Defensive coordinator

Awards and highlights
- Super Bowl champion (XXX); NFL Assistant Coach of the Year (2009); George Halas Award (2010)

Head coaching record
- Regular season: 72–56–1 (.562)
- Postseason: 2–3 (.400)
- Career: 74–59–1 (.556)
- Coaching profile at Pro Football Reference

Michael Zimmer (born June 5, 1956) is an American football coach. He began his NFL career as a defensive assistant with the Dallas Cowboys in 1994, where he helped the team win Super Bowl XXX in January 1996.

After positions as defensive coordinator for the Atlanta Falcons (2007) and Cincinnati Bengals (2008–2013), and head coach of the Minnesota Vikings (2014–2021), Zimmer returned to Dallas in 2024 as the team's defensive coordinator. He has earned a reputation for developing top-ranked defenses and fostering strong team performance.

== Playing career ==
In high school, Zimmer was a successful multi-sport athlete who earned all-conference honors in football (1972–73), baseball, and wrestling at Lockport Township High School in Lockport, Illinois. He enrolled at Illinois State University, majoring in physical education. Zimmer played quarterback in 1974, but he redshirted the following year and moved to linebacker in 1976 after breaking his thumb. A neck injury prematurely ended Zimmer's playing career that same year. His college teammates were positively influenced by his constantly "up" attitude, especially during hot August pre-season double workouts. Zimmer backed up quarterback Bob Lopez in 1974, who later went on to set many of Illinois State's passing records.

== Coaching career ==
=== College ===
Zimmer's first coaching job was as a part-time defensive assistant at the University of Missouri from 1979 to 1980. He then coached at Weber State College from 1981 to 1988, serving as the inside linebackers coach from 1981 to 1984, the defensive backs coach from 1985 to 1988, and the defensive coordinator from 1983 to 1988. From 1989 to 1993, Zimmer served as the defensive coordinator and defensive backs coach for the Washington State Cougars. In 1993, the Cougars defense ranked eighth in the nation in total defense and second in rushing defense.

=== National Football League ===
==== Dallas Cowboys (first stint) ====
Zimmer joined the Dallas Cowboys in 1994 as an assistant coach of the nickel defense under Barry Switzer. He was promoted to defensive backs coach the following year and served in that capacity before being promoted to defensive coordinator in 2000. The 2003 Dallas Cowboys' defense gave up the fewest yards in the NFL while running an aggressive, speedy 4–3 defense. Despite the Cowboys' problems over the years, Zimmer survived several coaching changes (Switzer, Chan Gailey, Dave Campo, Bill Parcells) and was rumored to have been a candidate for the head coaching job at the University of Nebraska (circa 2003). In 2005, he implemented the 3–4 defense favored by head coach Bill Parcells, although Zimmer had no prior experience with it.

==== Atlanta Falcons ====
When Bobby Petrino was hired to coach the Atlanta Falcons early in 2007, Mike Zimmer agreed to become the new defensive coordinator in Atlanta. Zimmer coached in Atlanta for only one season after Petrino left the Falcons for the University of Arkansas after 13 games. Zimmer has been very outspoken against Petrino after Petrino's unexpected departure from Atlanta in 2007.

==== Cincinnati Bengals ====
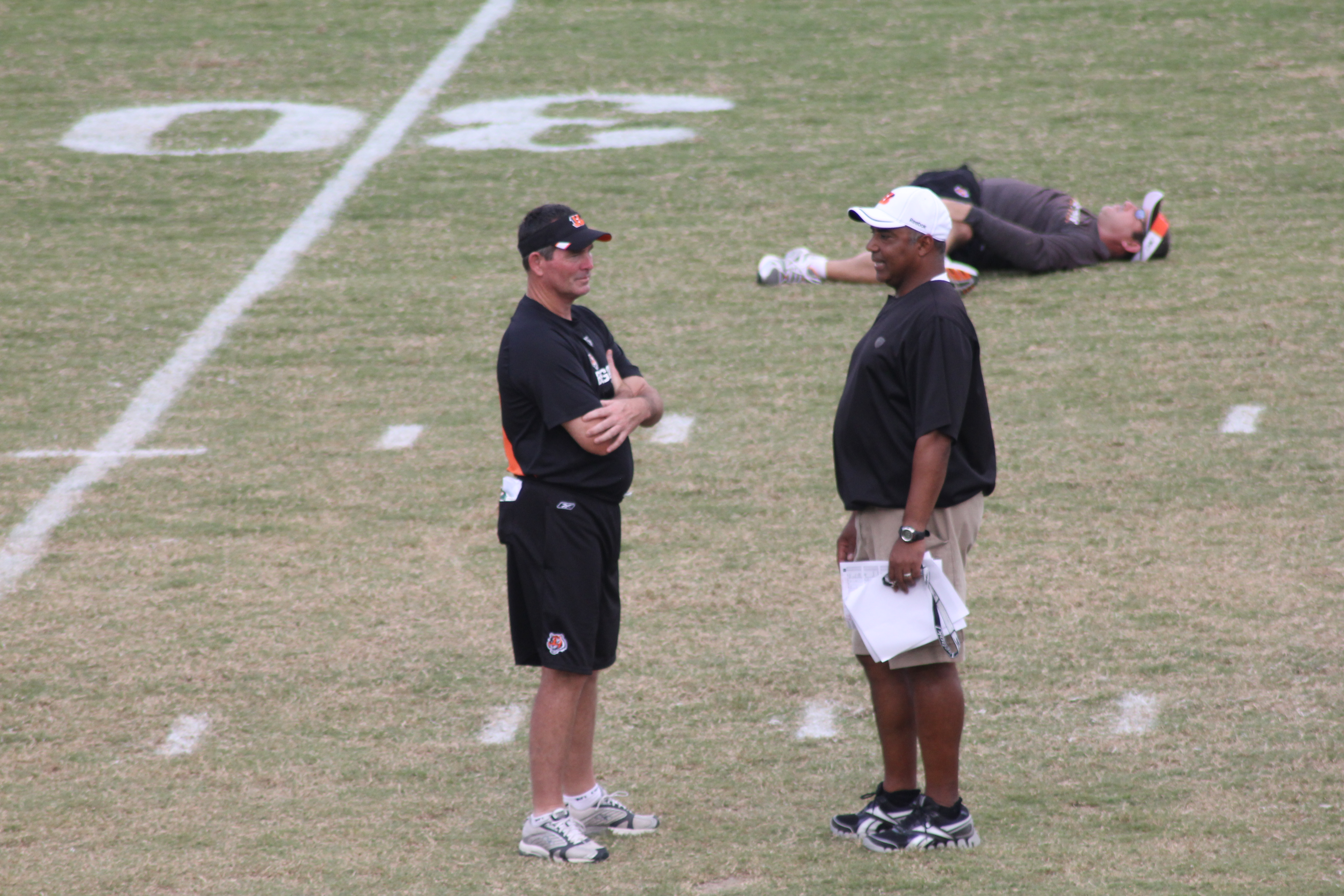
Zimmer with Bengals head coach Marvin Lewis in 2011

Zimmer was named the defensive coordinator for the Cincinnati Bengals on January 15, 2008. In 2009, Zimmer earned NFL Assistant Coach of the Year honors from Pro Football Weekly/Pro Football Writers and from CBSSports.com, after guiding the Bengals to the fourth-ranked defense in the league. In 2011, the Bengals defense finished with in total yards and in points allowed.

In 2012, the Bengals defense finished sixth in total yards and eighth in points allowed, prompting the Cleveland Browns to interview Zimmer for their head-coaching vacancy. The Browns eventually hired former offensive coordinator Rob Chudzinski on January 11, 2013.

==== Minnesota Vikings ====
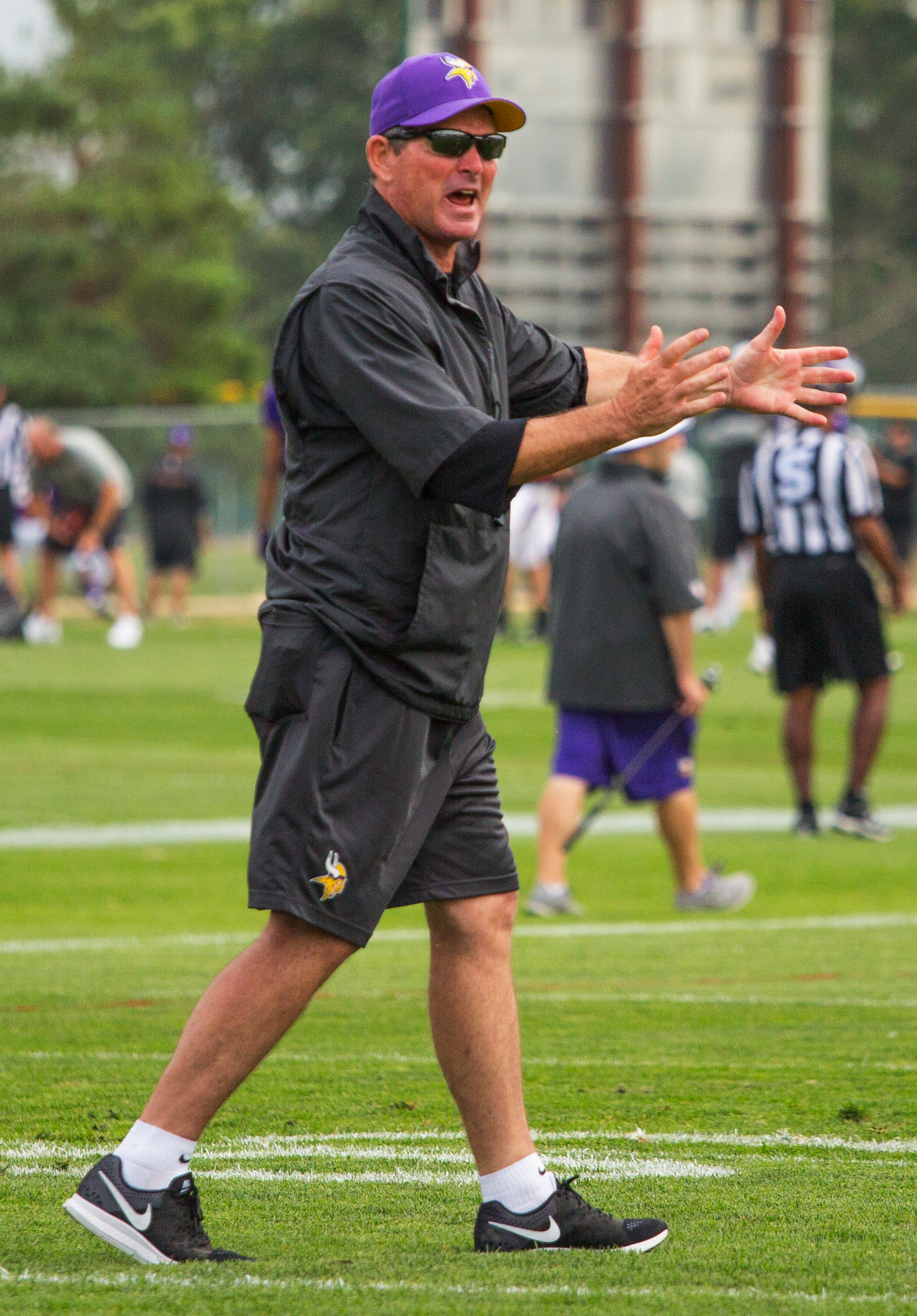
Zimmer in 2014

On January 15, 2014, Zimmer earned his first head-coaching position when the Minnesota Vikings hired him to replace Leslie Frazier. Zimmer was the ninth head coach in Vikings history.

Zimmer earned his first win as the Vikings' head coach on September 7, 2014, against the St. Louis Rams, with a score of 34–6. He ended his first year with a 7–9 record, an improvement over the team's 2013 record of 5–10–1, and the best record for a first-year head coach in the Minnesota Vikings franchise since Dennis Green in 1992.

In 2015, Zimmer improved on his 2014 record by ending the season with a record of 11–5 and winning the NFC North, ending Green Bay's streak of four consecutive division titles and giving the Vikings their first since 2009. At TCF Bank Stadium, the Vikings lost the wild-card playoff round to the Seattle Seahawks 10–9 while playing in subzero temperatures and the third-coldest game in NFL history.

On July 28, 2016, Zimmer signed a contract extension with the Vikings.

Zimmer suffered a detached retina during the October 31, 2016, Monday Night Football game against the Chicago Bears. On a windy night at Soldier Field, the edge of Zimmer's play card, which was laminated, blew into his eye. Zimmer underwent emergency eye surgery on November 30, forcing him to miss the Vikings' Thursday Night Football game against the Dallas Cowboys. Special teams coach Mike Priefer served as interim coach for the game. Zimmer finished the 2016 NFL season with a record of 8–8 and the Vikings failed to make the playoffs.

In 2017, Zimmer led the Vikings to one of the greatest seasons in franchise history. The Vikings finished 13–3, tallying the seventh-best regular season record in franchise history in terms of win percentage, and the second-best 16-game regular season record in franchise history. Only the 1998 Vikings hold a better record, at 15–1. In the playoffs, the 2017 Vikings beat the New Orleans Saints in the divisional round with a last-second touchdown pass from Case Keenum to Stefon Diggs, which became known as the "Minneapolis Miracle". They then lost the NFC Championship game to the eventual Super Bowl champion Philadelphia Eagles.

On September 9, 2018, Zimmer became the fourth head coach in Minnesota Vikings history to get 40 wins. The Vikings finished the 2018 season with a record of 8–7–1 and failed to make the playoffs after losing a "win-and-in" game to the Chicago Bears during the final week of the season.

On February 27, 2019, the Vikings exercised their option to keep Zimmer through 2020. On October 24, 2019, Zimmer became just the third coach to surpass 52 franchise wins, surpassing Jerry Burns; trailing only Dennis Green (97) and longtime coach Bud Grant (158).

The Vikings were able to return to the postseason in 2019. After upsetting the New Orleans Saints in the wild-card round, winning 26–20 in overtime, Minnesota fell to the top-seeded San Francisco 49ers in the divisional round, 27–10.

In late July 2020, Zimmer signed a three-year contract extension.

Hampered by injuries and opt-outs by many starting defensive players (including defensive end Danielle Hunter missing the entire 2020 season with a neck injury and new free-agent acquisition Michael Pierce opting out of the season due to COVID-19), the Vikings suffered a "down year" with a 7–9 record in 2020, missing the playoffs and finishing third in the NFC North. This was Zimmer's first losing season as a head coach since 2014.

The 2021 season produced similar results to the 2020 campaign finishing with an 8–9 record. On January 10, 2022, Zimmer was fired as head coach of the Vikings, ending his eight-year tenure with the team. Zimmer finished his tenure with the Vikings with a 74–59–1 (.556) record, which includes a 2–3 (.400) playoff record.

==== Dallas Cowboys (second stint) ====
On February 12, 2024, Zimmer was hired by the Dallas Cowboys to be their defensive coordinator for a second time, now under head coach Mike McCarthy, to replace Dan Quinn, who left to become head coach for the Washington Commanders.

On January 26, 2025, it was announced that Zimmer would not return to Dallas in 2025, and would likely retire.

== Head coaching record ==
Team	Year	Regular season					Postseason			
Team	Year	Won	Lost	Ties	Win %	Finish	Won	Lost	Win %	Result
MIN	2014	7	9	0	.438	3rd in NFC North	—	—	—	—
MIN	2015	11	5	0	.688	1st in NFC North	0	1	.000	Lost to Seattle Seahawks in NFC Wild Card Game
MIN	2016	8	8	0	.500	3rd in NFC North	—	—	—	—
MIN	2017	13	3	0	.813	1st in NFC North	1	1	.500	Lost to Philadelphia Eagles in NFC Championship Game
MIN	2018	8	7	1	.531	2nd in NFC North	—	—	—	—
MIN	2019	10	6	0	.625	2nd in NFC North	1	1	.500	Lost to San Francisco 49ers in NFC Divisional Game
MIN	2020	7	9	0	.438	3rd in NFC North	—	—	—	—
MIN	2021	8	9	0	.471	2nd in NFC North	—	—	—	—
Total		72	56	1	.562		2	3	.400	

- Before Week 13 of the 2016 season against the Dallas Cowboys, Zimmer had emergency eye surgery and was unable to coach the Vikings that week.

== Personal life ==
Zimmer is the son of former NFL player and coach, Bill Zimmer, who died on August 12, 2015, at age 84. His wife, Vikki, died unexpectedly at their Ohio home on October 8, 2009. Three days later, Zimmer was awarded the game ball by Bengals head coach Marvin Lewis after the team's 17–14 victory over the Baltimore Ravens.

Zimmer has three children: Adam, Corri, and Marki. Adam was a coach and served as an assistant linebackers coach with the New Orleans Saints during their Super Bowl winning season. Adam died unexpectedly on October 31, 2022.
