= 2015 Minnesota Vikings season =

55th season in franchise history

- Owner: Zygi Wilf
- General manager: Rick Spielman
- Head coach: Mike Zimmer
- Offensive coordinator: Norv Turner
- Defensive coordinator: George Edwards
- Home stadium: TCF Bank Stadium

Results
- Record: 11–5
- Division place: 1st NFC North
- Playoffs: Lost Wild Card Playoffs (vs. Seahawks) 9–10
- All-Pros: 2: RB Adrian Peterson (1st team); KR Cordarrelle Patterson (2nd team)
- Pro Bowlers: 5: QB Teddy Bridgewater; RB Adrian Peterson; DE Everson Griffen; OLB Anthony Barr; FS Harrison Smith

Uniform
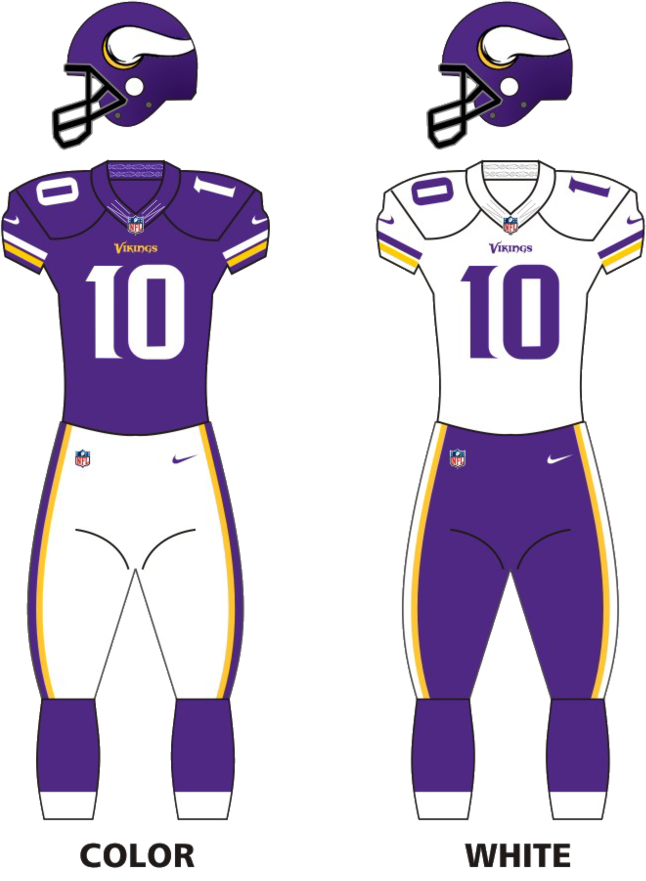

The 2015 season was the Minnesota Vikings' 55th season in the National Football League (NFL) and their second under head coach Mike Zimmer. It marked the last season in which the Vikings played their home games at the University of Minnesota's on-campus TCF Bank Stadium, before moving into U.S. Bank Stadium, which opened in July 2016, located on the site of the now-demolished Hubert H. Humphrey Metrodome.

The Vikings improved on their 7–9 record from 2014 and clinched a playoff berth for the first time since 2012. They also won their first NFC North title since 2009 with a Week 17 victory at the Packers. As a result, they hosted the Seattle Seahawks in the wild card round of the 2015–16 NFL playoffs, but lost 10–9 after kicker Blair Walsh missed a potential game-winning 27-yard field goal in the final seconds.

== Offseason ==
=== 2015 draft ===
Pro Bowler

2015 Minnesota Vikings Draft
Draft order		Player name	Position	College	Contract	Notes
Round	Selection	Player name	Position	College	Contract	Notes
1	11	Trae Waynes	CB	Michigan State	4 years / $12.944 million	
2	45	Eric Kendricks	LB	UCLA	4 years / $5.156 million	
3	76	Traded to the Kansas City Chiefs (Note: The Vikings traded their third-round selection (76th overall) to the Kansas City Chiefs in exchange for Kansas City's third- and sixth-round selections (80th and 193rd overall).)				
3	80	Traded to the Detroit Lions (Note: The Vikings traded the third-round selection they received from Kansas City (80th overall) to the Detroit Lions in exchange for Detroit's third-round selection and the fifth-round selection they received from Chicago via Denver (88th and 143rd overall).)				from Chiefs
3	88	Danielle Hunter	DE	LSU	4 years / $3.077 million	from Lions
4	110	T. J. Clemmings	OT	Pittsburgh	4 years / $2.804 million	
5	137	Traded to the Atlanta Falcons (Note: The Vikings traded the fifth-round selection they received from Tampa Bay via Buffalo (137th overall) to the Atlanta Falcons in exchange for Atlanta's fifth- and sixth-round selections (146th and 185th overall).)				from Buccaneers via Bills (Note: The Vikings traded their sixth-round selection (187th overall) and QB Matt Cassel to the Buffalo Bills in exchange for the fifth-round selection Buffalo received from Tampa Bay (137th overall) and a 2016 seventh-round selection (240th overall).)
5	143	MyCole Pruitt	TE	Southern Illinois	4 years / $2.51 million	from Lions via Broncos and Bears
5	146	Stefon Diggs	WR	Maryland	4 years / $2.5 million	from Falcons
5	149	Traded to the Miami Dolphins (Note: The Vikings traded their fifth-round selection (149th overall) to the Miami Dolphins in exchange for the seventh-round selection Miami received from San Francisco (232nd overall) and WR Mike Wallace.)				
6	185	Tyrus Thompson	OT	Oklahoma	4 years / $2.4 million	from Falcons
6	187	Traded to the Buffalo Bills				
6	193	B. J. Dubose	DE	Louisville	4 years / $2.399 million	from Chiefs
7	228	Austin Shepherd	OT	Alabama	4 years / $2.349 million	
7	232	Edmond Robinson	OLB	Newberry	4 years / $2.34 million	from 49ers via Dolphins

=== Roster changes ===
Re-signings
Date	Player name	Position	Contract terms
March 8, 2015	Tom Johnson	DE	3 years / $7 million
March 10, 2015	Matt Asiata	RB	1 year / $800,000
March 11, 2015	Joe Berger	C	2 years / $2.155 million
March 11, 2015	Cullen Loeffler	LS	1 year / $1.05 million
March 17, 2015	Mike Harris	OT	1 year / $1.542 million
July 4, 2015	John Sullivan	C	3 years / $16.7 million
July 26, 2015	Blair Walsh	K	4 year / $14 million

Departures
Date	Player name	Position	Note	New team
February 27, 2015	Charlie Johnson	G	Released	
March 10, 2015	Matt Cassel	QB	Traded	Buffalo Bills
March 10, 2015	Jerome Felton	FB	UFA	Buffalo Bills
March 13, 2015	Christian Ponder	QB	UFA	Oakland Raiders
March 14, 2015	Jasper Brinkley	ILB	UFA	Dallas Cowboys
March 14, 2015	Greg Jennings	WR	Released	Miami Dolphins
March 16, 2015	Vladimir Ducasse	G	UFA	Chicago Bears
March 26, 2015	Justin Anderson	LB	Released	Dallas Cowboys
March 26, 2015	Jordan McCray	G	Released	
April 2, 2015	Pat Devlin	QB	Released	Chicago Bears
August 24, 2015	Cullen Loeffler	LS	Released	
August 30, 2015	Joe Banyard	RB	Released	Jacksonville Jaguars
August 30, 2015	Brandon Bostick	TE	Released	Arizona Cardinals
August 30, 2015	Jalil Carter	CB	Released	
August 30, 2015	Justin Coleman	CB	Released	New England Patriots
August 30, 2015	DaVaris Daniels	WR	Released	New England Patriots
August 30, 2015	Stephen Goodin	OT	Released	Brooklyn Bolts (FXFL)
August 30, 2015	Josh Kaddu	LB	Released	
August 30, 2015	Jordan Leslie	WR	Released	Jacksonville Jaguars
August 30, 2015	Caesar Rayford	DE	Released	Los Angeles Kiss (AFL)
August 30, 2015	Chrishon Rose	DT	Released	
August 30, 2015	DeMarcus Van Dyke	CB	Released	Atlanta Falcons
September 5, 2015	Babatunde Aiyegbusi	OT	Waived	
October 6, 2015	Gerald Hodges	MLB	Traded	San Francisco 49ers
November 17, 2015	Chase Ford	TE	Signed off Practice Squad	Baltimore Ravens

Additions
Date	Player name	Position	Previous team	Contract terms
February 18, 2015	Brandon Bostick	TE	Green Bay Packers	Claimed off waivers
March 11, 2015	Shaun Hill	QB	St. Louis Rams	2 years / $6.5 million
March 13, 2015	Mike Wallace	WR	Miami Dolphins	Acquired in trade
March 19, 2015	DuJuan Harris	RB	Green Bay Packers	1 year / $660,000
March 24, 2015	Casey Matthews	LB	Philadelphia Eagles	1 years / $825,000
March 24, 2015	Taylor Mays	S	Cincinnati Bengals	1 year / $795,000
March 26, 2015	Babatunde Aiyegbusi	OL	Dresden Monarchs (GFL)	3 years / $1.575 million
March 27, 2015	Terence Newman	CB	Cincinnati Bengals	1 year / $2.25 million
April 2, 2015	Mike Kafka	QB	Tampa Bay Buccaneers	1 year / $660,000
April 2, 2015	Caesar Rayford	DE	Montreal Alouettes (CFL)	1 year / $660,000
April 6, 2015	Kevin McDermott	LS	Baltimore Ravens	2 years / $1.26 million
May 11, 2015	Isaac Fruechte	WR	Minnesota Golden Gophers (NCAA)	3 years / $1.575 million
June 9, 2015	Chrishon Rose	DT	East Carolina Pirates (NCAA)	
July 24, 2015	Josh Thomas	CB	Detroit Lions	
August 1, 2015	Ryan Whalen	WR	Cincinnati Bengals	
August 14, 2015	Greg Hickman	DT	Detroit Lions	
October 6, 2015	Nick Easton	C	San Francisco 49ers	Acquired in trade

== Staff ==
2015 Minnesota Vikings staff
Front office: Owner/chairman – Zygi Wilf; Owner/president – Mark Wilf; Owner/vice chairman – Leonard Wilf; General manager – Rick Spielman; Vice president of football operations – Rob Brzezinski; Assistant general manager – George Paton; Director of college scouting – Jamaal Stephenson; Director of pro scouting – Ryan Monnens; Head coaches: Head coach – Mike Zimmer; Offensive coaches: Offensive coordinator – Norv Turner; Quarterbacks – Scott Turner; Running backs – Kirby Wilson; Wide receivers – George Stewart; Assistant wide receivers – Drew Petzing; Tight ends – Kevin Stefanski; Offensive line – Jeff Davidson; Assistant offensive line – Hank Fraley; Offensive quality control – Andrew Janocko	Defensive coaches: Defensive coordinator – George Edwards; Defensive line – Andre Patterson; Assistant defensive line – Robert Rodriguez; Linebackers – Adam Zimmer; Defensive backs – Jerry Gray; Assistant defensive backs/defensive quality control – Jonathan Gannon; Defensive assistant – Jeff Howard; Special teams coaches: Special teams coordinator – Mike Priefer; Assistant special teams – Ryan Ficken; Strength and conditioning: Head athletic trainer – Eric Sugarman; Head strength and conditioning – Evan Marcus; Assistant strength and conditioning – Jeff Hurd; Assistant strength and conditioning – Chaz Mahle

== Roster ==
2015 Minnesota Vikings roster
Quarterbacks (QB): 5 Teddy Bridgewater; 6 Taylor Heinicke; 13 Shaun Hill; Running backs (RB): 44 Matt Asiata; 48 Zach Line FB; 31 Jerick McKinnon; 28 Adrian Peterson; Wide receivers (WR): 14 Stefon Diggs; 12 Charles Johnson; 84 Cordarrelle Patterson; 19 Adam Thielen; 11 Mike Wallace; 17 Jarius Wright; Tight ends (TE): 85 Rhett Ellison; 83 MyCole Pruitt; 82 Kyle Rudolph	Offensive linemen (OL): 61 Joe Berger C; 68 T. J. Clemmings T; 62 Nick Easton G; 63 Brandon Fusco G; 79 Michael Harris G; 75 Matt Kalil T; 67 Zac Kerin C/G; 74 Austin Shepherd T; 78 Jeremiah Sirles G; Defensive linemen (DL): 72 Kenrick Ellis DT; 73 Sharrif Floyd DT; 97 Everson Griffen DE; 99 Danielle Hunter DE; 92 Tom Johnson DT; 98 Linval Joseph DT; 91 Zach Moore DE; 96 Brian Robison DE; 94 Justin Trattou DE	Linebackers (LB): 55 Anthony Barr OLB; 52 Chad Greenway OLB; 54 Eric Kendricks MLB; 51 Edmond Robinson OLB; 59 Jason Trusnik OLB; 58 Brandon Watts OLB; Defensive backs (DB): 36 Robert Blanton SS; 41 Anthony Harris SS; 24 Captain Munnerlyn CB; 23 Terence Newman CB; 29 Xavier Rhodes CB; 21 Josh Robinson CB; 34 Andrew Sendejo SS; 35 Marcus Sherels CB; 22 Harrison Smith FS; 26 Trae Waynes CB; Special teams (ST): 18 Jeff Locke P; 47 Kevin McDermott LS; 3 Blair Walsh K	Practice squad: 90 B. J. Dubose DE; 76 Isame Faciane G; 15 Isaac Fruechte WR; 86 Dominique Jones TE; 37 John Lowdermilk SS; 56 Terrance Plummer MLB; 49 Blake Renaud FB; 50 Alex Singleton OLB; 43 Dominique Williams RB; 66 David Yankey G; Reserve: 60 Carter Bykowski T (IR); 57 Audie Cole MLB (IR); 95 Scott Crichton DE (IR); 32 Antone Exum S (IR); 71 Phil Loadholt T (IR); 59 Casey Matthews MLB (IR); 25 Jabari Price CB (IR); 93 Shamar Stephen DT (IR); 65 John Sullivan C (IR); -- Austin Wentworth G (NF-Ill.); Rookies in italics 53 active, 10 reserve, 10 practice squad

== Preseason ==
=== Schedule ===
On February 11, 2015, the National Football League announced that the Vikings would play the Pittsburgh Steelers in the Pro Football Hall of Fame Game. The game was played at Tom Benson Hall of Fame Stadium in Canton, Ohio, on Sunday, August 9. The remainder of the Vikings' preliminary preseason schedule was announced on April 9. The Vikings first hosted the Tampa Bay Buccaneers and the Oakland Raiders before road games against the Dallas Cowboys and the Tennessee Titans, making this the third consecutive year in which the Vikings face the Titans in the preseason.

Week	Date	Opponent	Result	Record	Venue	Attendance	NFL.com recap
HOF	August 9	Pittsburgh Steelers	W 14–3	1–0	Tom Benson Hall of Fame Stadium (Canton, Ohio)	22,364	Recap
1	August 15	Tampa Bay Buccaneers	W 26–16	2–0	TCF Bank Stadium	50,610	Recap
2	August 22	Oakland Raiders	W 20–12	3–0	TCF Bank Stadium	50,656	Recap
3	August 29	at Dallas Cowboys	W 28–14	4–0	AT&T Stadium	86,082	Recap
4	September 3	at Tennessee Titans	L 17–24	4–1	Nissan Stadium	61,294	Recap

=== Game summaries ===
==== Hall of Fame Game: vs. Pittsburgh Steelers ====
Hall of Fame Game: Minnesota Vikings vs. Pittsburgh Steelers – Game summary

Quarter	1	2	3	4	Total
Steelers	0	3	0	0	3
Vikings	0	7	7	0	14

at Tom Benson Hall of Fame Stadium, Canton, Ohio

- Date: August 9
- Game time: 7:00 p.m. CDT
- Game weather: Overcast, 79 °F (26 °C)
- Game attendance: 22,364
- Referee: Carl Cheffers (51)
- TV announcers (NBC): Al Michaels, Cris Collinsworth and Paul Burmeister
- Recap, Game Book

Game information

First quarter

- No scoring plays.

Second quarter

- PIT – Shaun Suisham 36-yard field goal, 8:23. Steelers 3–0. Drive: 6 plays, 36 yards, 1:43.
- MIN – MyCole Pruitt 34-yard pass from Mike Kafka (Blair Walsh kick), 4:20. Vikings 7–3. Drive: 8 plays, 81 yards, 4:03.

Third quarter

- MIN – Joe Banyard 1-yard run (Blair Walsh kick), 3:57. Vikings 14–3. Drive: 1 play, 1 yard, 0:03.

Fourth quarter

- No scoring plays.

Top passers

- PIT – Landry Jones – 16/32, 135 yards, INT
- MIN – Mike Kafka – 7/10, 66 yards, TD

Top rushers

- PIT – Dri Archer – 4 rushes, 24 yards
- MIN – Matt Asiata – 6 rushes, 30 yards

Top receivers

- PIT – Shakim Phillips – 2 receptions, 43 yards
- MIN – MyCole Pruitt – 4 receptions, 51 yards, TD

==== Week 1: vs. Tampa Bay Buccaneers ====
Preseason Week 1: Tampa Bay Buccaneers at Minnesota Vikings – Game summary

Quarter	1	2	3	4	Total
Buccaneers	3	6	7	0	16
Vikings	9	14	3	0	26

at TCF Bank Stadium, Minneapolis, Minnesota

- Date: August 15
- Game time: 7:00 p.m. CDT
- Game weather: Partly cloudy, 86 °F (30 °C)
- Game attendance: 50,610
- Referee: Walt Coleman (65)
- Recap, Game Book

Game information

First quarter

- MIN – Blair Walsh 46-yard field goal, 11:59. Vikings 3–0. Drive: 7 plays, 54 yards, 3:01
- MIN – Zach Line 1-yard run (run failed), 4:07 Vikings 9–0. Drive: 5 plays, 38 yards, 2:11
- TB – Patrick Murray 32-yard field goal, 0:36. Vikings 9–3. Drive: 9 plays, 64 yards, 3:31

Second quarter

- MIN – Cordarrelle Patterson 21-yard pass from Shaun Hill (Blair Walsh kick), 11:44. Vikings 16–3. Drive: 3 plays, 23 yards, 0:53
- MIN – Adam Thielen 15-yard pass from Shaun Hill (Blair Walsh kick), 3:45. Vikings 23–3. Drive: 4 plays, 34 yards, 2:06
- TB – Jameis Winston 8-yard run (pass failed), 1:04. Vikings 23–9. Drive 9 plays, 76 yards, 2:41

Third quarter

- MIN – Blair Walsh 42-yard field goal, 13:05. Vikings 26–9. Drive 4 plays, −1 yards, 0:40
- TB – Mike James 3-yard run (Patrick Murray kick), 7:56. Vikings 26–16. Drive: 7 plays, 31 yards, 2:19

Fourth quarter

- No scoring plays.

Top passers

- TB – Jameis Winston – 9/19, 131 yards, INT
- MIN – Shaun Hill – 8/9, 104 yards, 2 TD

Top rushers

- TB – Bobby Rainey – 5 rushes, 20 yards
- MIN – Dominique Williams – 6 rushes, 44 yards

Top receivers

- TB – Louis Murphy – 4 receptions, 54 yards
- MIN – Adam Thielen – 2 receptions, 54 yards, TD

==== Week 2: vs. Oakland Raiders ====
Preseason Week 2: Oakland Raiders at Minnesota Vikings – Game summary

Quarter	1	2	3	4	Total
Raiders	6	3	3	0	12
Vikings	0	13	7	0	20

at TCF Bank Stadium, Minneapolis, Minnesota

- Date: August 22
- Game time: 7:00 p.m. CDT
- Game weather: Cloudy, 79 °F (26 °C)
- Game attendance: 50,656
- Referee: Ed Hochuli (85)
- Recap, Game Book

Game information

First quarter

- OAK – Latavius Murray 2-yard run (run failed), 3:22. Raiders 6–0. Drive: 6 plays, 75 yards, 2:24.

Second quarter

- MIN – Charles Johnson 10-yard pass from Teddy Bridgewater (kick failed, wide right), 14:14. Tied 6–6. Drive: 8 plays, 60 yards, 4:08.
- OAK – Giorgio Tavecchio 26-yard field goal, 2:07. Raiders 9–6. Drive: 9 plays, 54 yards, 4:18.
- MIN – Chase Ford 4-yard pass from Shaun Hill (Blair Walsh kick), 0:08. Vikings 13–9. Drive: 13 plays, 80 yards, 1:59.

Third quarter

- OAK – Giorgio Tavecchio 37-yard field goal, 5:25. Vikings 13–12. Drive: 7 plays, 10 yards, 2:41.
- MIN – Blake Renaud 1-yard run (Blair Walsh kick), 2:42. Vikings 20–12. Drive: 3 plays, 1 yard, 0:49.

Fourth quarter

- No scoring plays.

Top passers

- OAK – Derek Carr – 4/8, 78 yards
- MIN – Teddy Bridgewater – 10/14, 89 yards, TD

Top rushers

- OAK – Michael Dyer – 12 rushes, 45 yards
- MIN – Jerick McKinnon – 12 rushes, 25 yards

Top receivers

- OAK – Amari Cooper – 1 receptions, 40 yards
- MIN – Charles Johnson – 4 receptions, 40 yards, TD

==== Week 3: at Dallas Cowboys ====
Preseason Week 3: Minnesota Vikings at Dallas Cowboys – Game summary

Quarter	1	2	3	4	Total
Vikings	3	10	8	7	28
Cowboys	0	14	0	0	14

at AT&T Stadium, Arlington, Texas

- Date: August 29
- Game time: 6:00 p.m. CDT
- Game weather: None (retractable roof closed)
- Game attendance: 86,082
- Referee: Ron Torbert (62)
- Recap, Game Book

Game information

First quarter

- MIN – Blair Walsh 28-yard field goal, 1:12. Vikings 3–0. Drive: 10 plays, 65 yards, 5:58.

Second quarter

- DAL – Terrance Williams 60-yard pass from Tony Romo (Dan Bailey kick), 14:48. Cowboys 7–3. Drive: 3 plays, 72 yards, 1:24.
- MIN – Cordarrelle Patterson 107-yard kickoff return (Blair Walsh kick), 14:35. Vikings 10–7. Drive: 0 plays, 0 yards, 0:13.
- DAL – Lucky Whitehead 8-yard pass from Tony Romo (Dan Bailey kick), 8:59. Cowboys 14–10. Drive: 2 plays, 23 yards, 0:39.
- MIN – Blair Walsh 45-yard field goal, 1:00. Cowboys 14–13. Drive: 7 plays, 26 yards, 2:24.

Third quarter

- MIN – Dominique Williams 3-yard run (Taylor Heinicke–Chase Ford pass), 8:58. Vikings 21–14. Drive: 6 plays, 73 yards, 2:23.

Fourth quarter

- MIN – Joe Banyard 7-yard run, (Blair Walsh kick), 2:57. Vikings 28–14. Drive: 7 plays, 52 yards, 3:21.

Top passers

- MIN – Taylor Heinicke – 11/11, 83 yards
- DAL – Tony Romo – 5/8, 88 yards, 2 TD

Top rushers

- MIN – Joe Banyard – 5 rushes, 26 yards, TD
- DAL – Darren McFadden – 4 rushes, 37 yards

Top receivers

- MIN – Mike Wallace – 3 receptions, 50 yards
- DAL – Terrance Williams – 1 receptions, 60 yards, TD

==== Week 4: at Tennessee Titans ====
Preseason Week 4: Minnesota Vikings at Tennessee Titans – Game summary

Quarter	1	2	3	4	Total
Vikings	0	3	7	7	17
Titans	14	0	3	7	24

at Nissan Stadium, Nashville, Tennessee

- Date: September 3
- Game time: 7:00 p.m. CDT
- Game weather: Cloudy, 90 °F (32 °C)
- Game attendance: 61,294
- Referee: Brad Allen (122)
- Recap, Game Book

Game information

First quarter

- TEN – Harry Douglas 59-yard pass from Marcus Mariota (Ryan Succop kick), 13:28. Titans 7–0. 4 plays, 79 yards, 1:32.
- TEN – Rico Richardson 3-yard pass from Zach Mettenberger (Ryan Succop kick), 7:32. Titans 14–0. 7 plays, 20 yards, 3:53.

Second quarter

- MIN – Blair Walsh 33-yard field goal, 0:19. Titans 14–3. 12 plays, 65 yards, 2:26.

Third quarter

- MIN – Dominique Williams 14-yard pass from Taylor Heinicke (Blair Walsh kick), 11:20. Titans 14–10. 8 plays, 80 yards, 3:40.
- TEN – Ryan Succop 40-yard field goal, 2:30. Titans 17–10. 4 plays, −11 yards, 1:00.

Fourth quarter

- TEN – Phillip Supernaw 1-yard pass from Alex Tanney (Ryan Succop kick), 8:05. Titans 24–10. 12 plays, 94 yards, 7:01.
- MIN – Stefon Diggs 7-yard pass from Taylor Heinicke (Blair Walsh kick), 3:54. Titans 24–17. 4 plays, 26 yards, 1:04.

Top passers

- MIN – Taylor Heinicke – 27/41, 279 yards, 2 TD
- TEN – Marcus Mariota – 2/3, 74 yards, TD

Top rushers

- MIN – Dominique Williams – 9 rushes, 24 yards
- TEN – David Fluellen – 12 rushes, 61 yards

Top receivers

- MIN – Stefon Diggs – 8 receptions, 85 yards, TD
- TEN – Harry Douglas – 1 receptions, 59 yards, TD

== Regular season ==
=== Schedule ===
The Vikings' 2015 schedule was announced on April 21.

Week	Date	Opponent	Result	Record	Venue	Attendance	NFL.com recap
1	September 14	at San Francisco 49ers	**L** 3–20	0–1	Levi's Stadium	70,499	Recap
2	September 20	**Detroit Lions**	**W** 26–16	1–1	TCF Bank Stadium	52,319	Recap
3	September 27	San Diego Chargers	**W** 31–14	2–1	TCF Bank Stadium	52,400	Recap
4	October 4	at Denver Broncos	**L** 20–23	2–2	Sports Authority Field at Mile High	77,029	Recap
5	Bye						
6	October 18	Kansas City Chiefs	**W** 16–10	3–2	TCF Bank Stadium	52,480	Recap
7	October 25	at **Detroit Lions**	**W** 28–19	4–2	Ford Field	60,231	Recap
8	November 1	at **Chicago Bears**	**W** 23–20	5–2	Soldier Field	62,311	Recap
9	November 8	St. Louis Rams	**W** 21–18 (OT)	6–2	TCF Bank Stadium	52,406	Recap
10	November 15	at Oakland Raiders	**W** 30–14	7–2	O.co Coliseum	54,700	Recap
11	November 22	**Green Bay Packers**	**L** 13–30	7–3	TCF Bank Stadium	52,529	Recap
12	November 29	at Atlanta Falcons	**W** 20–10	8–3	Georgia Dome	70,610	Recap
13	December 6	Seattle Seahawks	**L** 7–38	8–4	TCF Bank Stadium	52,430	Recap
14	December 10	at Arizona Cardinals	**L** 20–23	8–5	University of Phoenix Stadium	64,784	Recap
15	December 20	**Chicago Bears**	**W** 38–17	9–5	TCF Bank Stadium	52,421	Recap
16	December 27	New York Giants	**W** 49–17	10–5	TCF Bank Stadium	52,455	Recap
17	January 3	at **Green Bay Packers**	**W** 20–13	11–5	Lambeau Field	78,412	Recap

Note: Intra-division opponents are in bold text.

=== Game summaries ===
==== Week 1: at San Francisco 49ers ====
Week 1: Minnesota Vikings at San Francisco 49ers – Game summary

Quarter	1	2	3	4	Total
Vikings	0	0	0	3	**3**
**49ers**	0	7	3	10	**20**

at Levi's Stadium, Santa Clara, California

- Date: September 14
- Game time: 9:20 p.m. CDT/7:20 p.m. PDT
- Game weather: Partly cloudy, 70 °F (21 °C)
- Game attendance: 70,499
- Referee: Ed Hochuli (85)
- TV announcers (ESPN): Chris Berman, Trent Dilfer and Lindsay Czarniak
- Recap, Game Book

Game information

**First quarter**

- No scoring plays.

**Second quarter**

- SF – Carlos Hyde 10-yard run (Phil Dawson kick), 0:47. 49ers 7–0. **Drive: 11 plays, 93 yards, 4:58.**

**Third quarter**

- SF – Phil Dawson 30-yard field goal, 4:32. 49ers 10–0. **Drive: 14 plays, 73 yards, 5:42.**

**Fourth quarter**

- MIN – Blair Walsh 37-yard field goal, 14:43. 49ers 10–3. **Drive: 11 plays, 66 yards, 4:49.**
- SF – Carlos Hyde 17-yard run (Phil Dawson kick), 9:30. 49ers 17–3. **Drive: 10 plays, 80 yards, 5:13.**
- SF – Phil Dawson 25-yard field goal, 6:08. 49ers 20–3. **Drive: 5 plays, 23 yards, 2:14.**

**Top passers**

- MIN – Teddy Bridgewater – 23/32, 231 yards, INT
- SF – Colin Kaepernick – 17/26, 165 yards

**Top rushers**

- MIN – Adrian Peterson – 10 rushes, 31 yards
- SF – Carlos Hyde – 26 rushes, 168 yards, 2 TD

**Top receivers**

- MIN – Mike Wallace – 6 receptions, 63 yards
- SF – Anquan Boldin – 4 receptions, 36 yards

The Vikings opened their 2015 season on the road against the San Francisco 49ers. Despite allowing San Francisco to start with the ball, the Vikings made a positive start, as Andrew Sendejo blocked a 28-yard field goal attempt from Phil Dawson, which Marcus Sherels returned 44 yards to the San Francisco 26-yard line. Minnesota QB Teddy Bridgewater was unable to complete a single pass on the next drive, forcing Blair Walsh to attempt a 44-yard field goal; however, he pushed it wide right. After forcing the 49ers to punt on the next series, the Vikings were themselves forced to punt immediately afterwards, only for the 49ers' rookie former rugby league star Jarryd Hayne to muff the catch, allowing the Vikings to recover the ball. The next drive saw the Vikings attempt to convert on 4th-and-3, but Bridgewater's completed pass to tight end Kyle Rudolph fell a yard short of a fresh set of downs.

Both sides exchanged punts at the start of the second quarter, with the 49ers eventually returning one 85 yards for a touchdown, only for it to be called back for an illegal block by a San Francisco player. However, the ensuing possession ended with a 49ers touchdown, as they drove 93 yards in just under 5 minutes, before Carlos Hyde finished the series with a 10-yard touchdown run; after finding nowhere to go on his initial run to the right, he beat a Minnesota defender with a spin move and ran back to the left side of the field, where quarterback Colin Kaepernick led him into the end zone. With the Vikings unable to score in the remaining 47 seconds, the first half ended 7–0 to San Francisco.

Minnesota started the third quarter with the ball, but they were unable to make it out of their half before being forced to punt. The 49ers then extended their lead on the ensuing possession, driving 73 yards to the Minnesota 11-yard line to set up a 30-yard field goal attempt for Dawson. The Vikings finally got on the scoreboard early in the fourth quarter, as Walsh finished off a 66-yard drive with a 37-yard field goal, but the 49ers pulled further ahead with a second touchdown for Hyde on a 17-yard run. Bridgewater attempted to spark the Vikings back into the game, but a deep pass intended for Rudolph was intercepted by Tramaine Brock, setting up a 25-yard field goal for Dawson. The next drive saw the Vikings go for it again on 4th-and-8, but Bridgewater was sacked for a loss of 14 yards, allowing the 49ers to kneel out the game.

==== Week 2: vs. Detroit Lions ====
Week 2: Detroit Lions at Minnesota Vikings – Game summary

Quarter	1	2	3	4	Total
Lions	0	10	0	6	**16**
**Vikings**	7	10	6	3	**26**

at TCF Bank Stadium, Minneapolis, Minnesota

- Date: September 20
- Game time: 12:00 p.m. CDT
- Game weather: Partly cloudy, 67 °F (19 °C)
- Game attendance: 52,319
- Referee: Bill Vinovich (52)
- TV announcers (Fox): Sam Rosen, Kirk Morrison and Peter Schrager
- Recap, Game Book

Game information

**First quarter**

- MIN – Kyle Rudolph 5-yard pass from Teddy Bridgewater (Blair Walsh kick), 10:25. Vikings 7–0. **Drive: 11 plays, 75 yards, 4:35.**

**Second quarter**

- MIN – Teddy Bridgewater 1-yard run (Blair Walsh kick), 14:26. Vikings 14–0. **Drive: 7 plays, 50 yards, 2:58.**
- DET – Matt Prater 26-yard field goal, 7:12. Vikings 14–3. **Drive: 14 plays, 72 yards, 7:14.**
- MIN – Blair Walsh 28-yard field goal, 2:32. Vikings 17–3. **Drive: 9 plays, 70 yards, 4:40.**
- DET – Calvin Johnson 11-yard pass from Matthew Stafford (Matt Prater kick), 0:34. Vikings 17–10. **Drive: 8 plays, 73 yards, 1:58.**

**Third quarter**

- MIN – Zach Line 1-yard run (kick failed, wide right), 8:54. Vikings 23–10. **Drive: 6 plays, 34 yards, 2:31.**

**Fourth quarter**

- MIN – Blair Walsh 23-yard field goal, 6:20. Vikings 26–10. **Drive: 10 plays, 34 yards, 5:46.**
- DET – Eric Ebron 12-yard pass from Matthew Stafford (run failed), 1:48. Vikings 26–16. **Drive: 18 plays, 82 yards, 4:32.**

**Top passers**

- DET – Matthew Stafford – 32/53, 286 yards, 2 TD, INT
- MIN – Teddy Bridgewater – 14/18, 153 yards, TD

**Top rushers**

- DET – Matthew Stafford – 4 rushes, 20 yards
- MIN – Adrian Peterson – 29 rushes, 134 yards

**Top receivers**

- DET – Calvin Johnson – 10 receptions, 83 yards, TD
- MIN – Adrian Peterson – 2 receptions, 58 yards

==== Week 3: vs. San Diego Chargers ====
Week 3: San Diego Chargers at Minnesota Vikings – Game summary

Quarter	1	2	3	4	Total
Chargers	0	7	0	7	**14**
**Vikings**	3	7	14	7	**31**

at TCF Bank Stadium, Minneapolis, Minnesota

- Date: September 27
- Game time: 12:00 p.m. CDT
- Game weather: Sunny, 75 °F (24 °C)
- Game attendance: 52,400
- Referee: Terry McAulay (77)
- TV announcers (CBS): Ian Eagle, Dan Fouts and Evan Washburn
- Recap, Game Book

Game information

**First quarter**

- MIN – Blair Walsh 24-yard field goal, 1:15. Vikings 3–0. **Drive: 4 plays, 7 yards, 1:31.**

**Second quarter**

- MIN – Adrian Peterson 2-yard run (Blair Walsh kick), 9:05. Vikings 10–0. **Drive: 11 plays, 67 yards, 5:39.**
- SD – Keenan Allen 34-yard pass from Philip Rivers (Josh Lambo kick), 1:17. Vikings 10–7. **Drive: 9 plays, 90 yards, 2:17.**

**Third quarter**

- MIN – Adrian Peterson 43-yard run (Blair Walsh kick), 12:32. Vikings 17–7. **Drive: 1 play, 43 yards, 0:12.**
- MIN – Zach Line 1-yard run (Blair Walsh kick), 2:42. Vikings 24–7. **Drive: 16 plays, 86 yards, 7:19.**

**Fourth quarter**

- MIN – Chad Greenway 91-yard interception return (Blair Walsh kick), 13:57. Vikings 31–7.
- SD – Keenan Allen 19-yard pass from Kellen Clemens (Josh Lambo kick), 0:32. Vikings 31–14. **Drive: 14 plays, 89 yards, 8:05.**

**Top passers**

- SD – Philip Rivers – 21/34, 246 yards, TD, INT
- MIN – Teddy Bridgewater – 13/24, 121 yards, INT

**Top rushers**

- SD – Melvin Gordon – 14 rushes, 51 yards
- MIN – Adrian Peterson – 20 rushes, 126 yards, 2 TD

**Top receivers**

- SD – Keenan Allen – 12 receptions, 133 yards, 2 TD
- MIN – Mike Wallace – 3 receptions, 49 yards

==== Week 4: at Denver Broncos ====
Week 4: Minnesota Vikings at Denver Broncos – Game summary

Quarter	1	2	3	4	Total
Vikings	0	10	0	10	**20**
**Broncos**	3	10	7	3	**23**

at Sports Authority Field at Mile High, Denver, Colorado

- Date: October 4
- Game time: 3:25 p.m. CDT/2:25 p.m. MDT
- Game weather: Cloudy, 60 °F (16 °C)
- Game attendance: 77,029
- Referee: Walt Coleman (65)
- TV announcers (Fox): Kevin Burkhardt, John Lynch and Pam Oliver
- Recap, Game Book

Game information

**First quarter**

- DEN – Brandon McManus 33-yard field goal, 8:16. Broncos 3–0. **Drive: 7 plays, 48 yards, 3:05.**

**Second quarter**

- DEN – Ronnie Hillman 72-yard run (Brandon McManus kick), 11:24. Broncos 10–0. **Drive: 1 play, 72 yards, 0:11.**
- DEN – Brandon McManus 47-yard field goal, 5:57. Broncos 13–0. **Drive: 6 plays, 28 yards, 3:47.**
- MIN – Blair Walsh 38-yard field goal, 1:39. Broncos 13–3. **Drive: 13 plays, 60 yards, 4:18.**
- MIN – Mike Wallace 4-yard pass from Teddy Bridgewater (Blair Walsh kick), 0:12. Broncos 13–10. **Drive: 2 plays, 27 yards, 0:11.**

**Third quarter**

- DEN – Owen Daniels 1-yard pass from Peyton Manning (Brandon McManus kick), 11:10. Broncos 20–10. **Drive: 8 plays, 80 yards, 3:50.**

**Fourth quarter**

- MIN – Adrian Peterson 48-yard run (Blair Walsh kick), 10:01. Broncos 20–17. **Drive: 9 plays, 97 yards, 4:48.**
- MIN – Blair Walsh 33-yard field goal, 5:11. Tied 20–20. **Drive: 7 plays, 38 yards, 3:56.**
- DEN – Brandon McManus 39-yard field goal, 1:51. Broncos 23–20. **Drive: 9 plays, 55 yards, 3:20.**

**Top passers**

- MIN – Teddy Bridgewater – 27/41, 269 yards, TD
- DEN – Peyton Manning – 17/27, 213 yards, TD, 2 INT

**Top rushers**

- MIN – Adrian Peterson – 16 rushes, 81 yards, TD
- DEN – Ronnie Hillman – 11 rushes, 103 yards, TD

**Top receivers**

- MIN – Stefon Diggs – 6 receptions, 87 yards
- DEN – Demaryius Thomas – 9 receptions, 93 yards

==== Week 6: vs. Kansas City Chiefs ====
Week 6: Kansas City Chiefs at Minnesota Vikings – Game summary

Quarter	1	2	3	4	Total
Chiefs	0	0	0	10	**10**
**Vikings**	3	7	3	3	**16**

at TCF Bank Stadium, Minneapolis, Minnesota

- Date: October 18
- Game time: 12:00 p.m. CDT
- Game weather: Sunny, 54 °F (12 °C)
- Game attendance: 52,480
- Referee: Jerome Boger (23)
- TV announcers (CBS): Greg Gumbel, Trent Green and Stacey Dales
- Recap, Game Book

Game information

**First quarter**

- MIN – Blair Walsh 24-yard field goal, 5:40. Vikings 3–0. **Drive: 9 plays, 48 yards, 4:00.**

**Second quarter**

- MIN – Kyle Rudolph 4-yard pass from Teddy Bridgewater (Blair Walsh kick), 4:43. Vikings 10–0. **Drive: 11 plays, 51 yards, 6:09.**

**Third quarter**

- MIN – Blair Walsh 45-yard field goal, 8:51. Vikings 13–0. **Drive: 6 plays, 46 yards, 2:34.**

**Fourth quarter**

- KC – Cairo Santos 48-yard field goal, 13:10. Vikings 13–3. **Drive: 8 plays, 28 yards, 3:27.**
- KC – Albert Wilson 42-yard pass from Alex Smith (Cairo Santos kick), 8:46. Vikings 13–10. **Drive: 7 plays, 77 yards, 2:26.**
- MIN – Blair Walsh 45-yard field goal, 4:46. Vikings 16–10. **Drive: 10 plays, 53 yards, 4:00.**

**Top passers**

- KC – Alex Smith – 22/37, 282 yards, TD
- MIN – Teddy Bridgewater – 17/31, 249 yards, TD, 2 INT

**Top rushers**

- KC – Charcandrick West – 9 rushes, 33 yards
- MIN – Adrian Peterson – 26 rushes, 60 yards

**Top receivers**

- KC – Travis Kelce – 5 receptions, 88 yards
- MIN – Stefon Diggs – 7 receptions, 129 yards

==== Week 7: at Detroit Lions ====
Week 7: Minnesota Vikings at Detroit Lions – Game summary

Quarter	1	2	3	4	Total
**Vikings**	3	12	10	3	**28**
Lions	14	3	0	2	**19**

at Ford Field, Detroit, Michigan

- Date: October 25
- Game time: 1:00 p.m. EDT/12:00 p.m. CDT
- Game weather: None (indoor stadium)
- Game attendance: 60,231
- Referee: Ed Hochuli (85)
- TV announcers (Fox): Chris Myers, Ronde Barber and Jennifer Hale
- Recap, Game Book

Game information

**First quarter**

- DET – Calvin Johnson 1-yard pass from Matthew Stafford (Matt Prater kick), 11:10. Lions 7–0. **Drive: 7 plays, 75 yards, 3:50.**
- MIN – Blair Walsh 37-yard field goal, 3:47. Lions 7–3. **Drive: 15 plays, 63 yards, 7:23.**
- DET – Eric Ebron 7-yard pass from Matt Stafford (Matt Prater kick), 1:24. Lions 14–3. **Drive: 4 plays, 80 yards, 2:23.**

**Second quarter**

- MIN – Blair Walsh 53-yard field goal, 11:11. Lions 14–6. **Drive: 9 plays, 37 yards, 5:13.**
- DET – Matt Prater 52-yard field goal, 5:03. Lions 17–6. **Drive: 6 plays, 8 yards, 2:53.**
- MIN – Kyle Rudolph 1-yard pass from Teddy Bridgewater (kick failed, wide right), 1:49. Lions 17–12. **Drive: 7 plays, 79 yards, 3:14.**
- MIN – Blair Walsh 51-yard field goal, 0:00. Lions 17–15. **Drive: 8 plays, 19 yards, 1:13.**

**Third quarter**

- MIN – Stefon Diggs 36-yard pass from Teddy Bridgewater (Blair Walsh kick), 10:19. Vikings 22–17. **Drive: 8 plays, 78 yards, 4:41.**
- MIN – Blair Walsh 35-yard field goal, 6:07. Vikings 25–17. **Drive: 5 plays, 61 yards, 2:07.**

**Fourth quarter**

- MIN – Blair Walsh 22-yard field goal, 14:10. Vikings 28–17. **Drive: 10 plays, 49 yards, 4:57.**
- DET – Jeff Locke out of bounds in the end zone for a safety, 0:59. Vikings 28–19.

**Top passers**

- MIN – Teddy Bridgewater – 25/35, 316 yards, 2 TD
- DET – Matthew Stafford – 18/26, 256 yards, 2 TD

**Top rushers**

- MIN – Adrian Peterson – 19 rushes, 98 yards
- DET – Ameer Abdullah – 8 rushes, 43 yards

**Top receivers**

- MIN – Stefon Diggs – 6 receptions, 108 yards, TD
- DET – Eric Ebron – 5 receptions, 89 yards, TD

==== Week 8: at Chicago Bears ====
Week 8: Minnesota Vikings at Chicago Bears – Game summary

Quarter	1	2	3	4	Total
**Vikings**	7	3	0	13	**23**
Bears	3	7	3	7	**20**

at Soldier Field, Chicago, Illinois

- Date: November 1
- Game time: 12:00 p.m. CST
- Game weather: Sunny, 62 °F (17 °C)
- Game attendance: 62,311
- Referee: John Hussey (35)
- TV announcers (Fox): Chris Myers, Ronde Barber and Holly Sonders
- Preview, Game Book

Game information

**First quarter**

- CHI – Robbie Gould 55-yard field goal, 10:56. Bears 3–0. **Drive: 6 plays, 17 yards, 3:07.**
- MIN – Marcus Sherels 65-yard punt return (Blair Walsh kick), 3:37. Vikings 7–3.

**Second quarter**

- MIN – Blair Walsh 43-yard field goal, 9:05. Vikings 10–3. **Drive: 12 plays, 51 yards, 6:46.**
- CHI – Alshon Jeffery 21-yard pass from Jay Cutler (Robbie Gould kick), 0:42. Tied 10–10. **Drive: 3 plays, 34 yards, 0:19.**

**Third quarter**

- CHI – Robbie Gould 33-yard field goal, 8:28. Bears 13–10. **Drive: 12 plays, 68 yards, 6:32.**

**Fourth quarter**

- MIN – Blair Walsh 48-yard field goal, 13:29. Tied 13–13. **Drive: 9 plays, 29 yards, 3:23.**
- CHI – Jay Cutler 4-yard run (Robbie Gould kick), 4:55. Bears 20–13. **Drive: 14 plays, 74 yards, 8:34.**
- MIN – Stefon Diggs 40-yard pass from Teddy Bridgewater (Blair Walsh kick), 1:49. Tied 20–20. **Drive: 7 plays, 84 yards, 3:06.**
- MIN – Blair Walsh 36-yard field goal, 0:00. Vikings 23–20. **Drive: 4 plays, 48 yards, 1:00.**

**Top passers**

- MIN – Teddy Bridgewater – 17/30, 187 yards, TD, INT
- CHI – Jay Cutler – 22/33, 211 yards, TD

**Top rushers**

- MIN – Adrian Peterson – 20 rushes, 103 yards
- CHI – Jeremy Langford – 12 rushes, 46 yards

**Top receivers**

- MIN – Stefon Diggs – 6 receptions, 95 yards, TD
- CHI – Alshon Jeffery – 10 receptions, 116 yards, TD

==== Week 9: vs. St. Louis Rams ====
Week 9: St. Louis Rams at Minnesota Vikings – Game summary

Quarter	1	2	3	4	OT	Total
Rams	6	9	0	3	0	**18**
**Vikings**	10	0	8	0	3	**21**

at TCF Bank Stadium, Minneapolis, Minnesota

- Date: November 8
- Game time: 12:00 p.m. CST
- Game weather: Sunny, 51 °F (11 °C)
- Game attendance: 52,406
- Referee: Ron Torbert (62)
- TV announcers (Fox): Thom Brennaman, Charles Davis and Tony Siragusa
- Recap, Game Book

Game information

**First quarter**

- MIN – Blair Walsh 34-yard field goal, 10:19. Vikings 3–0. **Drive: 8 plays, 30 yards, 3:36.**
- MIN – Adrian Peterson 6-yard run (Blair Walsh kick), 5:24. Vikings 10–0. **Drive: 6 plays, 80 yards, 3:32.**
- STL – Todd Gurley 1-yard run (run failed), 1:09. Vikings 10–6. **Drive: 8 plays, 80 yards, 4:15.**

**Second quarter**

- STL – Greg Zuerlein 61-yard field goal, 10:55. Vikings 10–9. **Drive: 6 plays, 22 yards, 2:20.**
- STL – Greg Zuerlein 35-yard field goal, 3:23. Rams 12–10. **Drive: 12 plays, 57 yards, 5:47.**
- STL – Greg Zuerlein 45-yard field goal, 0:00. Rams 15–10. **Drive: 8 plays, 58 yards, 1:45.**

**Third quarter**

- MIN – Teddy Bridgewater 6-yard run (Teddy Bridgewater run), 8:39. Vikings 18–15. **Drive: 6 plays, 60 yards, 3:20.**

**Fourth quarter**

- STL – Greg Zuerlein 53-yard field goal, 0:12. Tied 18–18. **Drive: 5 plays, 26 yards, 1:02.**

**Overtime**

- MIN – Blair Walsh 40-yard field goal, 9:20. Vikings 21–18. **Drive: 7 plays, 29 yards, 3:59.**

**Top passers**

- STL – Nick Foles – 18/33, 168 yards
- MIN – Teddy Bridgewater – 13/21, 144 yards, INT

**Top rushers**

- STL – Todd Gurley – 24 rushes, 89 yards, TD
- MIN – Adrian Peterson – 29 rushes, 125 yards, TD

**Top receivers**

- STL – Kenny Britt – 3 receptions, 87 yards
- MIN – Stefon Diggs – 3 receptions, 42 yards

==== Week 10: at Oakland Raiders ====
Week 10: Minnesota Vikings at Oakland Raiders – Game summary

Quarter	1	2	3	4	Total
**Vikings**	10	10	0	10	**30**
Raiders	0	14	0	0	**14**

at O.co Coliseum, Oakland, California

- Date: November 15
- Game time: 3:05 p.m. CST/1:05 p.m. PST
- Game weather: Sunny, 62 °F (17 °C)
- Game attendance: 54,700
- Referee: Tony Corrente (99)
- TV announcers (Fox): Chris Myers, Ronde Barber and Holly Sonders
- Preview, Game Book

Game information

**First quarter**

- MIN – Rhett Ellison 11-yard pass from Teddy Bridgewater (Blair Walsh kick), 10:59. Vikings 7–0. **Drive: 8 plays, 80 yards, 4:01.**
- MIN – Blair Walsh 20-yard field goal, 1:32. Vikings 10–0. **Drive: 6 plays, 39 yards, 2:17.**

**Second quarter**

- MIN – Blair Walsh 38-yard field goal, 10:33. Vikings 13–0. **Drive: 8 plays, 48 yards, 4:19.**
- OAK – Clive Walford 10-yard pass from Derek Carr (Sebastian Janikowski kick), 5:54. Vikings 13–7. **Drive: 9 plays, 68 yards, 4:39.**
- OAK – Andre Holmes 34-yard pass from Derek Carr (Sebastian Janikowski kick), 1:52. Raiders 14–13. **Drive: 4 plays, 74 yards, 1:29.**
- MIN – Cordarrelle Patterson 93-yard kickoff return (Blair Walsh kick), 1:39. Vikings 20–14.

**Third quarter**

- No scoring plays.

**Fourth quarter**

- MIN – Blair Walsh 34-yard field goal, 3:50. Vikings 23–14. **Drive: 10 plays, 63 yards, 5:41.**
- MIN – Adrian Peterson 80-yard run (Blair Walsh kick), 1:50. Vikings 30–14. **Drive: 1 play, 80 yards, 0:13.**

**Top passers**

- MIN – Teddy Bridgewater – 14/22, 140 yards, TD
- OAK – Derek Carr – 29/43, 302 yards, 2 TD, 2 INT

**Top rushers**

- MIN – Adrian Peterson – 26 rushes, 203 yards, TD
- OAK – Latavius Murray – 12 rushes, 48 yards

**Top receivers**

- MIN – Stefon Diggs – 2 receptions, 46 yards
- OAK – Amari Cooper – 5 receptions, 79 yards

==== Week 11: vs. Green Bay Packers ====
Week 11: Green Bay Packers at Minnesota Vikings – Game summary

Quarter	1	2	3	4	Total
**Packers**	6	10	3	11	**30**
Vikings	6	0	7	0	**13**

at TCF Bank Stadium, Minneapolis, Minnesota

- Date: November 22
- Game time: 3:25 p.m. CST
- Game weather: Mostly cloudy, 30 °F (−1 °C)
- Game attendance: 52,529
- Referee: Walt Coleman (65)
- TV announcers (Fox): Joe Buck, Troy Aikman and Erin Andrews
- Preview, Game Book

Game information

**First quarter**

- GB – Mason Crosby 42-yard field goal, 4:49. Packers 3–0. **Drive: 13 plays, 56 yards, 5:35.**
- MIN – Kyle Rudolph 47-yard pass from Teddy Bridgewater (kick failed, wide right), 3:01. Vikings 6–3. **Drive: 4 plays, 64 yards, 1:48.**
- GB – Mason Crosby 47-yard field goal, 1:37. Tied 6–6. **Drive: 4 plays, 5 yards, 1:24.**

**Second quarter**

- GB – Mason Crosby 40-yard field goal, 10:17. Packers 9–6. **Drive: 6 plays, 45 yards, 2:18.**
- GB – Randall Cobb 10-yard pass from Aaron Rodgers (Mason Crosby kick), 0:06. Packers 16–6. **Drive: 9 plays, 80 yards, 2:13.**

**Third quarter**

- GB – Mason Crosby 42-yard field goal, 10:13. Packers 19–6. **Drive: 12 plays, 61 yards, 4:47.**
- MIN – Adrian Peterson 6-yard run (Blair Walsh kick), 2:37. Packers 19–13. **Drive: 4 plays, 63 yards, 2:00.**

**Fourth quarter**

- GB – James Jones 27-yard pass from Aaron Rodgers (Aaron Rodgers to James Jones pass), 14:51. Packers 27–13. **Drive: 7 plays, 80 yards, 2:46.**
- GB – Mason Crosby 52-yard field goal, 4:14. Packers 30–13. **Drive: 4 plays, 1 yard, 0:23.**

**Top passers**

- GB – Aaron Rodgers – 16/34, 212 yards, 2 TD
- MIN – Teddy Bridgewater – 25/37, 296 yards, TD

**Top rushers**

- GB – Eddie Lacy – 22 rushes, 100 yards
- MIN – Adrian Peterson – 13 rushes, 45 yards, TD

**Top receivers**

- GB – James Jones – 6 receptions, 109 yards, TD
- MIN – Kyle Rudolph – 6 receptions, 106 yards, TD

==== Week 12: at Atlanta Falcons ====
Week 12: Minnesota Vikings at Atlanta Falcons – Game summary

Quarter	1	2	3	4	Total
**Vikings**	7	0	3	10	**20**
Falcons	0	3	0	7	**10**

at Georgia Dome, Atlanta, Georgia

- Date: November 29
- Game time: 1:00 p.m. EST/12:00 p.m. CST
- Game weather: None (indoor stadium)
- Game attendance: 70,610
- Referee: Clete Blakeman (34)
- TV announcers (Fox): Kevin Burkhardt, John Lynch and Pam Oliver
- Recap, Game Book

Game information

**First quarter**

- MIN – Adrian Peterson 1-yard run (Blair Walsh kick), 3:42. Vikings 7–0. **Drive: 13 plays, 78 yards, 6:30.**

**Second quarter**

- ATL – Shayne Graham 31-yard field goal, 6:13. Vikings 7–3. **Drive: 15 plays, 67 yards, 8:03.**

**Third quarter**

- MIN – Blair Walsh 29-yard field goal, 1:49. Vikings 10–3. **Drive: 10 plays, 69 yards, 6:10.**

**Fourth quarter**

- MIN – Blair Walsh 39-yard field goal, 6:24. Vikings 13–3. **Drive: 14 plays, 67 yards, 8:26.**
- MIN – Adrian Peterson 35-yard run (Blair Walsh kick), 4:15. Vikings 20–3. **Drive: 3 plays, 40 yards, 0:19.**
- ATL – Nick Williams 1–yd pass from Matt Ryan (Shayne Graham kick), 1:28. Vikings 20–10. **Drive: 9 plays, 80 yards, 2:47.**

**Top passers**

- MIN – Teddy Bridgewater – 20/28, 174 yards, INT
- ATL – Matt Ryan – 22/31, 230 yards, TD, 2 INT

**Top rushers**

- MIN – Adrian Peterson – 29 rushes, 158 yards, 2 TD
- ATL – Tevin Coleman – 18 rushes, 110 yards

**Top receivers**

- MIN – Kyle Rudolph – 7 receptions, 53 yards
- ATL – Jacob Tamme – 5 receptions, 69 yards

==== Week 13: vs. Seattle Seahawks ====
Week 13: Seattle Seahawks at Minnesota Vikings – Game summary

Quarter	1	2	3	4	Total
**Seahawks**	7	14	14	3	**38**
Vikings	0	0	7	0	**7**

at TCF Bank Stadium, Minneapolis, Minnesota

- Date: December 6
- Game time: 12:00 p.m. CST
- Game weather: Cloudy, 37 °F (3 °C)
- Game attendance: 52,430
- Referee: Terry McAulay (77)
- TV announcers (Fox): Kevin Burkhardt, John Lynch and Pam Oliver
- Recap, Game Book

Game information

**First quarter**

- SEA – Thomas Rawls 5-yard run (Steven Hauschka kick), 3:36. Seahawks 7–0. **Drive: 12 plays, 81 yards, 7:39.**

**Second quarter**

- SEA – Russell Wilson 8-yard run (Steven Hauschka kick), 2:04. Seahawks 14–0. **Drive: 13 plays, 98 yards, 6:15.**
- SEA – Doug Baldwin 20–yd pass from Russell Wilson (Steven Hauschka kick), 1:04. Seahawks 21–0. **Drive: 1 play, 20 yards, 0:04.**

**Third quarter**

- SEA – Fred Jackson 5–yd pass from Russell Wilson (Steven Hauschka kick), 9:12. Seahawks 28–0. **Drive: 7 plays, 42 yards, 3:45.**
- SEA – Doug Baldwin 53–yd pass from Russell Wilson (Steven Hauschka kick), 1:01. Seahawks 35–0. **Drive: 6 plays, 75 yards, 2:52.**
- MIN – Cordarrelle Patterson 101–yd kickoff return (Blair Walsh kick), 0:48. Seahawks 35–7.

**Fourth quarter**

- SEA – Steven Hauschka 23-yard field goal, 8:00. Seahawks 38–7. **Drive: 15 plays, 75 yards, 7:48.**

**Top passers**

- SEA – Russell Wilson – 21/27, 274 yards, 3 TD
- MIN – Teddy Bridgewater – 17/28, 118 yards, INT

**Top rushers**

- SEA – Thomas Rawls – 19 rushes, 101 yards, TD
- MIN – Jerick McKinnon – 4 rushes, 18 yards

**Top receivers**

- SEA – Doug Baldwin – 5 receptions, 94 yards, 2 TD
- MIN – Mike Wallace – 2 receptions, 43 yards

==== Week 14: at Arizona Cardinals ====
Week 14: Minnesota Vikings at Arizona Cardinals – Game summary

Quarter	1	2	3	4	Total
Vikings	7	3	0	10	**20**
**Cardinals**	10	0	7	6	**23**

at University of Phoenix Stadium, Glendale, Arizona

- Date: December 10
- Game time: 7:25 p.m. CST/6:25 p.m. MST
- Game weather: Mostly clear, 68 °F (20 °C) (retractable roof open)
- Game attendance: 64,784
- Referee: Gene Steratore (114)
- TV announcers (NFLN): Jim Nantz, Phil Simms and Tracy Wolfson
- Recap, Game Book

Game information

**First quarter**

- ARI – Chandler Catanzaro 27-yard field goal, 7:23. Cardinals 3–0. **Drive: 14 plays, 71 yards, 7:37.**
- MIN – Adrian Peterson 9-yard run (Blair Walsh kick), 3:57. Vikings 7–3. **Drive: 7 play, 80 yards, 3:26.**
- ARI – John Brown 65-yard pass from Carson Palmer (Chandler Catanzaro kick), 1:43. Cardinals 10–7. **Drive: 5 plays, 80 yards, 2:14.**

**Second quarter**

- MIN – Blair Walsh 44-yard field goal, 0:02. Tied 10–10. **Drive: 10 plays, 54 yards, 3:42.**

**Third quarter**

- ARI – Michael Floyd 42-yard pass from Carson Palmer (Chandler Catanzaro kick), 8:31. Cardinals 17–10. **Drive: 6 plays, 57 yards, 2:49.**

**Fourth quarter**

- ARI – Chandler Catanzaro 23-yard field goal, 14:55. Cardinals 20–10. **Drive: 16 plays, 66 yards, 7:13.**
- MIN – Blair Walsh 54-yard field goal, 12:10. Cardinals 20–13. **Drive: 8 plays, 28 yards, 2:45.**
- MIN – Mike Wallace 7-yard pass from Teddy Bridgewater (Blair Walsh kick), 4:55. Tied 20–20. **Drive: 11 plays, 88 yards, 5:10.**
- ARI – Chandler Catanzaro 47-yard field goal, 1:23. Cardinals 23–20. **Drive: 11 plays, 55 yards, 3:32.**

**Top passers**

- MIN – Teddy Bridgewater – 25/36, 335 yards, TD
- ARI – Carson Palmer – 25/35, 310 yards, 2 TD

**Top rushers**

- MIN – Adrian Peterson – 23 rushes, 69 yards, TD
- ARI – David Johnson – 19 rushes, 92 yards

**Top receivers**

- MIN – Kyle Rudolph – 6 receptions, 67 yards
- ARI – Michael Floyd – 5 receptions, 102 yards, TD

==== Week 15: vs. Chicago Bears ====
Week 15: Chicago Bears at Minnesota Vikings – Game summary

Quarter	1	2	3	4	Total
Bears	0	7	3	7	**17**
**Vikings**	7	10	7	14	**38**

at TCF Bank Stadium, Minneapolis, Minnesota

- Date: December 20
- Game time: 12:00 p.m. CST
- Game weather: Cloudy, 36 °F (2 °C)
- Game attendance: 52,421
- Referee: Brad Allen (122)
- TV announcers (Fox): Kevin Burkhardt, John Lynch and Pam Oliver
- Recap, Game Book

Game information

**First quarter**

- MIN – Stefon Diggs 15-yard pass from Teddy Bridgewater (Blair Walsh kick), 5:44. Vikings 7–0. **Drive: 13 plays, 93 yards, 6:22.**

**Second quarter**

- MIN – Blair Walsh 53-yard field goal, 14:22. Vikings 10–0. **Drive: 8 plays, 36 yards, 4:16.**
- CHI – Alshon Jeffery 10-yard pass from Jay Cutler (Robbie Gould kick), 5:40. Vikings 10–7. **Drive: 6 plays, 52 yards, 2:25.**
- MIN – Jerick McKinnon 17-yard pass from Teddy Bridgewater (Blair Walsh kick), 0:26. Vikings 17–7. **Drive: 8 plays, 80 yards, 5:14.**

**Third quarter**

- MIN – Stefon Diggs 33-yard pass from Teddy Bridgewater (Blair Walsh kick), 10:40. Vikings 24–7. **Drive: 6 plays, 55 yards, 3:10.**
- CHI – Robbie Gould 51-yard field goal, 4:23. Vikings 24–10. **Drive: 15 plays, 47 yards, 6:17.**

**Fourth quarter**

- MIN – Teddy Bridgewater 12-yard run (Blair Walsh kick), 8:45. Vikings 31–10. **Drive: 3 plays, 13 yards, 1:10.**
- CHI – Matt Forte 4-yard pass from Jay Cutler (Robbie Gould kick), 5:13. Vikings 31–17. **Drive: 9 plays, 65 yards, 3:32.**
- MIN – Zach Line 4-yard pass from Teddy Bridgewater (Blair Walsh kick), 1:50. Vikings 38–17. **Drive: 8 plays, 43 yards, 3:23.**

**Top passers**

- CHI – Jay Cutler – 26/37, 231 yards, 2 TD, INT
- MIN – Teddy Bridgewater – 17/20, 231 yards, 4 TD

**Top rushers**

- CHI – Matt Forte – 8 rushes, 47 yards
- MIN – Adrian Peterson – 18 rushes, 63 yards

**Top receivers**

- CHI – Matt Forte – 6 receptions, 57 yards, TD
- MIN – Jerick McKinnon – 4 receptions, 76 yards, TD

Teddy Bridgewater's best game of his career, going 17/20, 231 yards, and 4 touchdowns, along with a rushing touchdown on the ground. Before this game, Bridgewater had only 9 passing touchdowns, and afterwards, he had 13. Jay Cutler and the Chicago Bears were stopped to 17 points, while Cutler also having a good game with 26/37 for 231 and 2 touchdowns.

==== Week 16: vs. New York Giants ====
Week 16: New York Giants at Minnesota Vikings – Game summary

Quarter	1	2	3	4	Total
Giants	0	3	7	7	**17**
**Vikings**	3	16	13	17	**49**

at TCF Bank Stadium, Minneapolis, Minnesota

- Date: December 27
- Game time: 7:30 p.m. CST
- Game weather: Partly cloudy, 13 °F (−11 °C)
- Game attendance: 52,455
- Referee: Tony Corrente (99)
- TV announcers (NBC): Al Michaels, Cris Collinsworth and Michele Tafoya
- Recap, Game Book

Game information

**First quarter**

- MIN – Blair Walsh 32-yard field goal, 0:08. Vikings 3–0. **Drive: 8 plays, 40 yards, 3:44.**

**Second quarter**

- MIN – Kyle Rudolph 28-yard pass from Teddy Bridgewater (Blair Walsh kick), 11:02. Vikings 10–0. **Drive: 5 plays, 44 yards, 2:04.**
- NYG – Josh Brown 27-yard field goal, 8:22. Vikings 10–3. **Drive: 8 plays, 71 yards, 2:40.**
- MIN – Harrison Smith 35-yard interception return (kick failed, hit left upright), 4:00. Vikings 16–3.
- MIN – Blair Walsh 52-yard field goal, 0:04. Vikings 19–3. **Drive: 7 plays, 23 yards, 1:01.**

**Third quarter**

- MIN – Blair Walsh 22-yard field goal, 7:35. Vikings 22–3. **Drive: 9 plays, 58 yards, 5:06.**
- MIN – Adrian Peterson 2-yard run (Blair Walsh kick), 6:40. Vikings 29–3. **Drive: 2 plays, 4 yards, 0:42.**
- MIN – Blair Walsh 53-yard field goal, 1:51. Vikings 32–3. **Drive: 6 plays, 47 yards, 3:27.**
- NYG – Rueben Randle 72-yard pass from Eli Manning (Josh Brown kick), 1:02. Vikings 32–10. **Drive: 2 plays, 80 yards, 0:49.**

**Fourth quarter**

- MIN – Jerick McKinnon 7-yard run (Blair Walsh kick), 13:31. Vikings 39–10. **Drive: 6 plays, 18 yards, 2:31.**
- MIN – Blair Walsh 27-yard field goal, 9:34. Vikings 42–10. **Drive: 5 plays, 26 yards, 2:44.**
- MIN – Jerick McKinnon 68-yard run (Blair Walsh kick), 3:36. Vikings 49–10. **Drive: 3 plays, 80 yards, 1:43.**
- NYG – Myles White 25-yard pass from Ryan Nassib (Josh Brown kick), 1:54. Vikings 49–17. **Drive: 6 plays, 77 yards, 1:42.**

**Top passers**

- NYG – Eli Manning – 15/29, 234 yards, TD, 3 INT
- MIN – Teddy Bridgewater – 15/25, 168 yards, TD

**Top rushers**

- NYG – Rashad Jennings – 14 rushes, 74 yards
- MIN – Adrian Peterson – 22 rushes, 104 yards, TD

**Top receivers**

- NYG – Rueben Randle – 2 receptions, 80 yards, TD
- MIN – Jarius Wright – 3 receptions, 57 yards

==== Week 17: at Green Bay Packers ====
Week 17: Minnesota Vikings at Green Bay Packers – Game summary

Quarter	1	2	3	4	Total
**Vikings**	3	3	14	0	**20**
Packers	3	0	0	10	**13**

at Lambeau Field, Green Bay, Wisconsin

- Date: January 3, 2016
- Game time: 7:30 p.m. CST
- Game weather: Cloudy, 24 °F (−4 °C)
- Game attendance: 78,412
- Referee: Bill Vinovich (52)
- TV announcers (NBC): Al Michaels, Cris Collinsworth and Michele Tafoya
- Recap, Game Book

Game information

**First quarter**

- MIN – Blair Walsh 39-yard field goal, 10:45. Vikings 3–0. **Drive: 10 plays, 59 yards, 4:15.**
- GB – Mason Crosby 28-yard field goal, 2:02. Tied 3–3. **Drive: 15 plays, 70 yards, 8:43.**

**Second quarter**

- MIN – Blair Walsh 32-yard field goal, 2:55. Vikings 6–3. **Drive: 8 plays, 43 yards, 3:37.**

**Third quarter**

- MIN – Adrian Peterson 3-yard run (Blair Walsh kick), 10:32. Vikings 13–3. **Drive: 6 plays, 58 yards, 2:55.**
- MIN – Captain Munnerlyn 55-yard fumble return (Blair Walsh kick), 4:28. Vikings 20–3.

**Fourth quarter**

- GB – Richard Rodgers 16-yard pass from Aaron Rodgers (Mason Crosby kick), 13:27. Vikings 20–10. **Drive: 14 plays, 80 yards, 6:01.**
- GB – Mason Crosby 43-yard field goal, 5:35. Vikings 20–13. **Drive: 8 plays, 59 yards, 4:25.**

**Top passers**

- MIN – Teddy Bridgewater – 10/19, 99 yards, INT
- GB – Aaron Rodgers – 28/44, 291 yards, TD, INT

**Top rushers**

- MIN – Adrian Peterson – 19 rushes, 67 yds, TD
- GB – Eddie Lacy – 13 rushes, 34 yds

**Top receivers**

- MIN – Jerick McKinnon – 3 receptions, 33 yards
- GB – James Jones – 4 receptions, 102 yards

=== Standings ===
==== Division ====
NFC North
	W	L	T	PCT	DIV	CONF	PF	PA	STK
^{(3)} Minnesota Vikings	11	5	0	.688	5–1	8–4	365	302	W3
^{(5)} Green Bay Packers	10	6	0	.625	3–3	7–5	368	323	L2
Detroit Lions	7	9	0	.438	3–3	6–6	358	400	W3
Chicago Bears	6	10	0	.375	1–5	3–9	335	397	L1

==== Conference ====
NFC
#	Team	Division	W	L	T	PCT	DIV	CONF	SOS	SOV	STK
**Division Leaders**
1	Carolina Panthers	South	15	1	0	.938	5–1	11–1	.441	.438	W1
2	Arizona Cardinals	West	13	3	0	.813	4–2	10–2	.477	.457	L1
3	Minnesota Vikings	North	11	5	0	.688	5–1	8–4	.504	.449	W3
4	Washington Redskins	East	9	7	0	.563	4–2	8–4	.465	.403	W4
**Wild Cards**
5 (Note: Green Bay finished ahead of Seattle based on head-to-head victory.)	Green Bay Packers	North	10	6	0	.625	3–3	7–5	.531	.450	L2
6	Seattle Seahawks	West	10	6	0	.625	3–3	7–5	.520	.431	W1
**Did not qualify for the postseason**
7	Atlanta Falcons	South	8	8	0	.500	1–5	5–7	.480	.453	L1
8 (Note: St. Louis and Detroit finished ahead of Philadelphia and New Orleans based on conference record. St. Louis finished ahead of Detroit based on head-to-head victory. Detroit finished ahead of Philadelphia and New Orleans based on head-to-head sweep, while Philadelphia finished ahead of New Orleans based on head-to-head victory.)	St. Louis Rams	West	7	9	0	.438	4–2	6–6	.527	.482	L1
9	Detroit Lions	North	7	9	0	.438	3–3	6–6	.535	.429	W3
10	Philadelphia Eagles	East	7	9	0	.438	3–3	4–8	.508	.473	W1
11	New Orleans Saints	South	7	9	0	.438	3–3	5–7	.504	.402	W2
12 (Note: The New York Giants and Chicago each finished ahead of Tampa Bay based on head-to-head victory, while the Giants finished ahead of Chicago based on conference record.)	New York Giants	East	6	10	0	.375	2–4	4–8	.500	.396	L3
13	Chicago Bears	North	6	10	0	.375	1–5	3–9	.547	.469	L1
14	Tampa Bay Buccaneers	South	6	10	0	.375	3–3	5–7	.484	.406	L4
15	San Francisco 49ers	West	5	11	0	.313	1–5	4–8	.539	.463	W1
16	Dallas Cowboys	East	4	12	0	.250	3–3	3–9	.531	.438	L4
**Tiebreakers** (Note: When breaking ties for three or more teams under the NFL's rules, they are first broken within divisions, then comparing only the highest-ranked remaining team from each division.)

== Postseason ==
=== Schedule ===
Round	Date	Opponent (seed)	Result	Record	Venue	Attendance	NFL.com recap
Wild Card	January 10, 2016	Seattle Seahawks (6)	L 9–10	0–1	TCF Bank Stadium	52,090	Recap

=== Game summaries ===
==== NFC Wild Card Playoffs: vs. #6 Seattle Seahawks ====
NFC Wild Card Playoffs: #6 Seattle Seahawks at #3 Minnesota Vikings – Game summary

Quarter	1	2	3	4	Total
Seahawks	0	0	0	10	10
Vikings	3	0	6	0	9

at TCF Bank Stadium, Minneapolis, Minnesota

- Date: January 10, 2016
- Game time: 12:05 p.m. CST
- Game weather: Clear, −6 °F (−21 °C)
- Game attendance: 52,090
- Referee: Walt Coleman (65)
- TV announcers (NBC): Al Michaels, Cris Collinsworth and Michele Tafoya
- Recap, Game Book

Game information

First quarter

- MIN – Blair Walsh 22-yard field goal, 1:01. Vikings 3–0. Drive: 10 plays, 25 yards, 5:52.

Second quarter

- No scoring plays.

Third quarter

- MIN – Blair Walsh 43-yard field goal, 7:04. Vikings 6–0. Drive: 5 plays, 28 yards, 2:45.
- MIN – Blair Walsh 47-yard field goal, 0:02. Vikings 9–0. Drive: 8 plays, 19 yards, 4:39.

Fourth quarter

- SEA – Doug Baldwin 3-yard pass from Russell Wilson (Steven Hauschka kick), 11:37. Vikings 9–7. Drive: 7 plays, 80 yards, 3:25.
- SEA – Steven Hauschka 46-yard field goal, 8:04. Seahawks 10–9. Drive: 7 plays, 12 yards, 2:33.

Top passers

- SEA – Russell Wilson – 13/26, 142 yards, TD, INT
- MIN – Teddy Bridgewater – 17/24, 146 yards

Top rushers

- SEA – Christine Michael – 21 rushes, 70 yards
- MIN – Adrian Peterson – 23 rushes, 45 yards

Top receivers

- SEA – Doug Baldwin – 5 receptions, 42 yards, TD
- MIN – Stefon Diggs – 4 receptions, 26 yards

The Vikings' only points in this game came from the foot of kicker Blair Walsh, whose three field goals put them 9–0 up by the end of the third quarter; however, Seattle outscored them 10–0 in the final period, with a touchdown catch from Doug Baldwin being followed by a 46-yard Steven Hauschka field goal in the first seven minutes of the quarter. The Vikings had a chance to win it with 20 seconds remaining, but Walsh missed a 27-yard field goal, reminding Vikings fans of Gary Anderson's missed field goal in the 1998 NFC Championship Game.

== Pro Bowl ==
Running back Adrian Peterson was the only Minnesota Viking selected for the 2016 Pro Bowl. It was Peterson's seventh Pro Bowl selection, tying him for the fourth-most in Vikings franchise history with offensive tackle Ron Yary. After Houston Texans DE J. J. Watt suffered an injury in the wildcard round game against the Kansas City Chiefs, Vikings defensive end Everson Griffen was called up to replace him, his first career Pro Bowl selection. Griffen was followed by a fellow first-time Pro Bowler, safety Harrison Smith, on January 25, after Earl Thomas of the Seattle Seahawks was ruled out of the game due to injury. The next day, quarterback Teddy Bridgewater and linebacker Anthony Barr were added to the Pro Bowl roster as replacements for injured Arizona Cardinals quarterback Carson Palmer and New England Patriots linebacker Jamie Collins respectively.

== Statistics ==
=== Team leaders ===
Category	Player(s)	Value
Passing yards	Teddy Bridgewater	3,231
Passing touchdowns	Teddy Bridgewater	14
Rushing yards	Adrian Peterson	1,485
Rushing touchdowns	Adrian Peterson	11
Receptions	Stefon Diggs	52
Receiving yards	Stefon Diggs	720
Receiving touchdowns	Kyle Rudolph	5
Points	Blair Walsh	135
Kickoff return yards	Cordarrelle Patterson	1,019
Punt return yards	Marcus Sherels	311
Tackles	Eric Kendricks	92
Sacks	Everson Griffen	10.5
Interceptions	Terence Newman	3
Forced fumbles	Anthony Barr	3

Source: Minnesota Vikings' official website

=== League rankings ===
Category	Total yards	Yards per game	NFL rank (out of 32)
Passing offense	2,928	183.0	31st
Rushing offense	2,211	138.2	4th
Total offense	5,139	321.2	29th
Passing defense	3,759	234.9	12th
Rushing defense	1,748	109.2	17th
Total defense	5,507	344.2	13th

Source: NFL.com.
