= Kyle Rudolph =

American football player (born 1989)

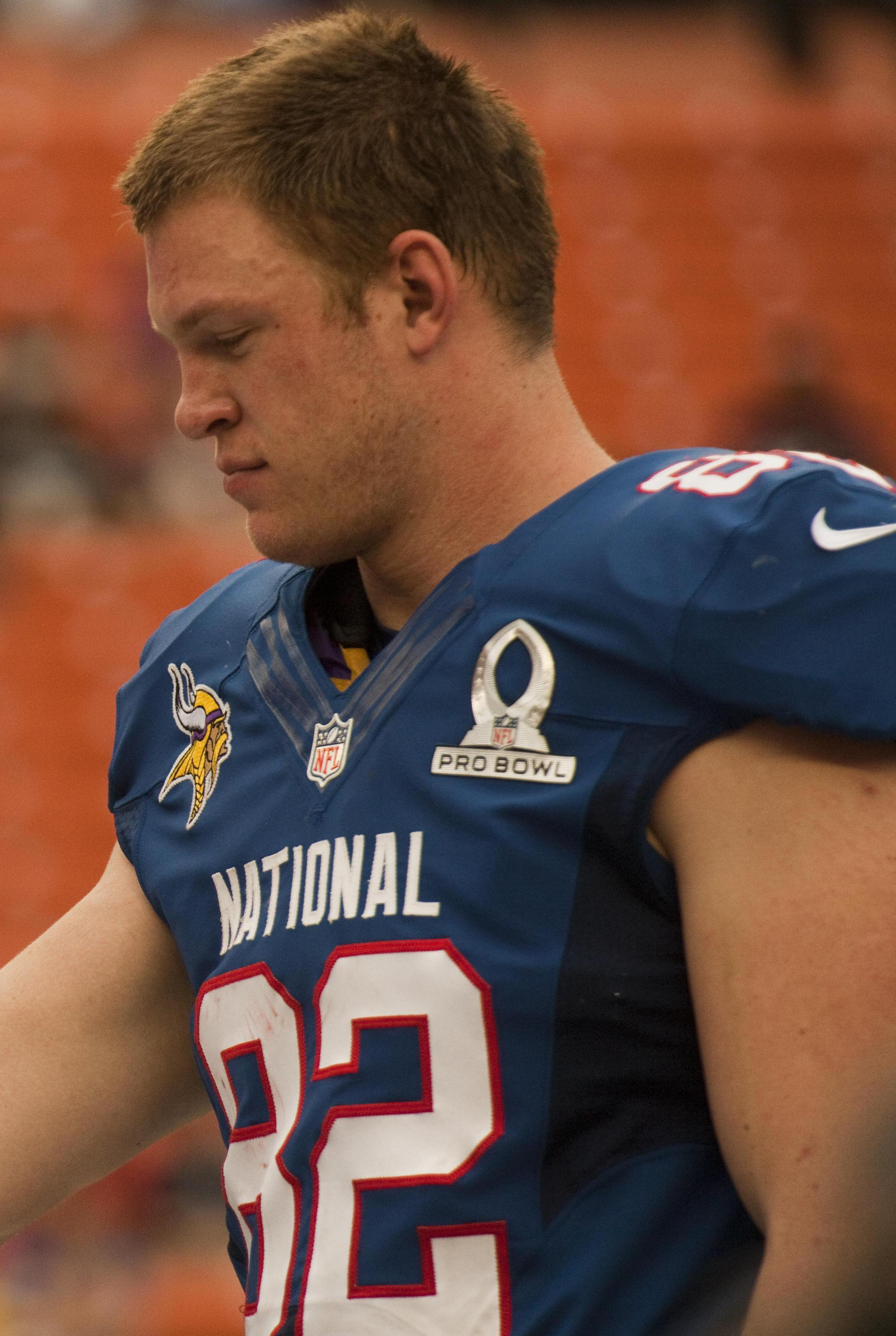
- Rudolph at the 2013 Pro Bowl

No. 82, 80, 8
- Position: Tight end

Personal information
- Born: November 9, 1989 (age 37); Cincinnati, Ohio, U.S.
- Listed height: 6 ft 6 in (1.98 m)
- Listed weight: 258 lb (117 kg)

Career information
- High school: Elder (Cincinnati)
- College: Notre Dame (2008–2010)
- NFL draft: 2011: 2nd round, 43rd overall pick

Career history
- Minnesota Vikings (2011–2020); New York Giants (2021); Tampa Bay Buccaneers (2022)

Awards and highlights
- 2× Pro Bowl (2012, 2017); Pro Bowl MVP (2012); PFWA All-Rookie Team (2011)

Career NFL statistics
- Receptions: 482
- Receiving yards: 4,773
- Receiving touchdowns: 50
- Stats at Pro Football Reference

Kyle Daniel Rudolph (born November 9, 1989) is an American former professional football player who was a tight end for 12 seasons in the National Football League (NFL), primarily with the Minnesota Vikings. He played college football for the Notre Dame Fighting Irish and was selected by the Vikings in the second round of the 2011 NFL draft. He was selected for two Pro Bowls. He also played for the New York Giants and the Tampa Bay Buccaneers.

== Early life ==
Rudolph attended Elder High School in Cincinnati, Ohio, where he played high school football for the Panthers. As a junior, he caught 30 passes for 400 yards and seven touchdowns en route to earning first-team All-city and All-conference honors. As a senior in 2008, he was named first-team All-American by USA Today after totaling 37 receptions for 673 yards (18.2 yards per catch) and 11 touchdowns. He was placed on the Scout.com All-America first-team and was the lone tight end among the 11 finalists for the high school Maxwell Award. He received first-team All-Southwest Ohio as a senior after being named second-team as a junior, and was named second-team All-state by the Associated Press. After his senior season, Rudolph was invited to play in the 2008 U.S. Army All-American Bowl held in San Antonio, Texas.

An accomplished basketball player as well, Rudolph played center for his high school team and was the conference player of the year three times and All-Southwest Ohio in 2007. He is currently the second-leading scorer in school history and became just the second Panther to surpass 1,000 career points. He set the school record for most career rebounds when he corralled his 568th rebound on January 11, 2008. Against Moeller (#1 in Ohio, #9 in the nation) on January 25, 2008, he scored 25 of Elder's 52 points as the Panthers almost upset the top-ranked team in Ohio, 58–52.

Rudolph was rated as the best tight end and 20th best overall recruit in the class of 2008 according to Rivals.com. He was named the second-best player and the top tight end in the Detroit Free Press' Best of the Midwest Top 20 list. He was considered the No. 1 tight end in the recruiting class and the 20th-best prospect in the nation by Tom Lemming. He was ranked 21st in the country and No. 2 in the state of Ohio by Scout.com. He was also considered the 23rd-best player by Sports Illustrated. He accepted a scholarship offer from Notre Dame over Michigan, Tennessee, and Ohio State.

== College career ==
=== Freshman season ===
As a freshman in 2008, Rudolph became the first tight end in Notre Dame history to start all 13 games as a freshman and the first freshman to ever start a season opener at tight end for Notre Dame. He made his career debut in the season opener against San Diego State and brought in his first career reception for five yards during the victory. In week 3, he posted his first multi-reception game (two catches for 29 yards) of his career against Michigan State, with both catches traveling for 10-plus yards and resulting in first downs against the Spartans. The following week, he hauled in three passes for 32 yards, with a long of 19, while also recording the first touchdown catch of his career in the Irish' 38–21 win over Purdue. In week 5, he registered season-highs in receptions (5) and receiving yards (70) and added his second and final touchdown of the season versus Stanford. He hauled in two catches for 26 yards against Pittsburgh, setting a new school record for receptions by a freshman tight end in a single season during the game. In week 11, he established a school record for single-season receiving yards by a freshman tight end during the game against Syracuse. In the 2008 Hawaii Bowl game, he caught four passes for a season-high 78 yards. His 29-yard reception against the Warriors also set a season-best long reception. Rudolph finished his first year with the Irish with 29 receptions for 340 yards (11.7 avg.) and two touchdowns.

=== Sophomore season ===
As a sophomore in 2009, Rudolph participated in only ten games with nine starts, missing three due to a shoulder injury and totaling 275:59 of playing time while making 57 special-teams appearances. He was named semi-finalist for the John Mackey Award (presented annually to college football's most outstanding tight end) and was the only sophomore to be named semi-finalist. He hauled in four catches for 29 yards and a touchdown in the opener against Nevada. In week 3, he set a then career-high with 95 receiving yards against Michigan State including a season-long 52-yard reception. His performance against the Spartans earned him John Mackey Tight End of the Week honors. He nabbed touchdown catches in back-to-back weeks against Purdue and Washington, with the first coming against the Boilermakers when there were only 24 seconds remaining in the game on a fourth-and-goal situation that sealed Notre Dame's win; the second touchdown reception against Washington came with less than two minutes remaining in regulation and gave the Irish the lead. He was voted by his teammates to represent tight ends on the Irish Leadership Committee. Rudolph ended the season ranked third on the team with 33 receptions (17 resulting in first downs) for 364 yards and three touchdowns.

=== Junior season ===
Rudolph had his promising 2010 junior season derailed by a hamstring injury that ended his season after six games. On September 11, he set a Notre Dame record for most receiving yards in a game by a tight end against Michigan with 164 yards on eight receptions, with more than half of the yardage coming after he hauled in the second-longest pass play in school history with a 95-yard touchdown. Rudolph finished his final collegiate season with 28 receptions for 328 yards and three touchdowns, ending his three-season career at Notre Dame ranked among the all-time leading tight ends in school history. His 90 career receptions were the fourth-most by a tight end in school history and his 1,032 career receiving yards are also fourth-most. His pair of eight-catch games fell one reception short of the school record for a tight end of nine receptions in a game and was only the fourth Irish tight end to break the 1,000-yard career yardage plateau.

On January 4, 2011, Rudolph decided to forgo his senior season and declared for the 2011 NFL draft.

== Professional career ==
=== Pre-draft ===
Pre-draft measurables
Height	Weight	Arm length	Hand span	Wingspan	40-yard dash	10-yard split	20-yard split	20-yard shuttle	Three-cone drill	Vertical jump	Broad jump	Bench press
6 ft 6 1/8 in (1.98 m)	259 lb (117 kg)	34 in (0.86 m)	10 3/4 in (0.27 m)	6 ft 8 5/8 in (2.05 m)	4.83 s	1.67 s	2.80 s	4.37 s	7.24 s	34.5 in (0.88 m)	9 ft 5 in (2.87 m)	19 reps
All values from NFL Combine/Notre Dame's Pro Day

Rudolph did not participate in the 2011 NFL Scouting Combine because of his torn hamstring, but posted a 4.78 40-yard dash time only three weeks after being medically cleared to participate at Notre Dame's Pro Day in South Bend, Indiana.

=== Minnesota Vikings ===
==== 2011 season ====
Rudolph was selected by the Minnesota Vikings with the 43rd overall pick in the second round of the 2011 NFL draft. He was the first tight end selected in the draft and is the second-highest drafted tight end in Vikings history behind Hal Bedsole (chosen in the first round, 19th overall) in the 1964 NFL draft.

During his rookie season, Rudolph started 8 of 15 games, catching 26 passes for 249 yards with a 9.6-yard average per reception and three receiving touchdowns, all of them in the final seven games of the season as he assumed larger role in Bill Musgrave's offense. In Week 4, he hauled in a season-long 41-yard pass against the Kansas City Chiefs. His first career touchdown came on a 1-yard pass from fellow rookie quarterback Christian Ponder against the Oakland Raiders on November 20. Overall, he finished his rookie season with 26 receptions for 249 yards and three touchdowns. He was named to the NFL All-Rookie Team.

==== 2012 season ====
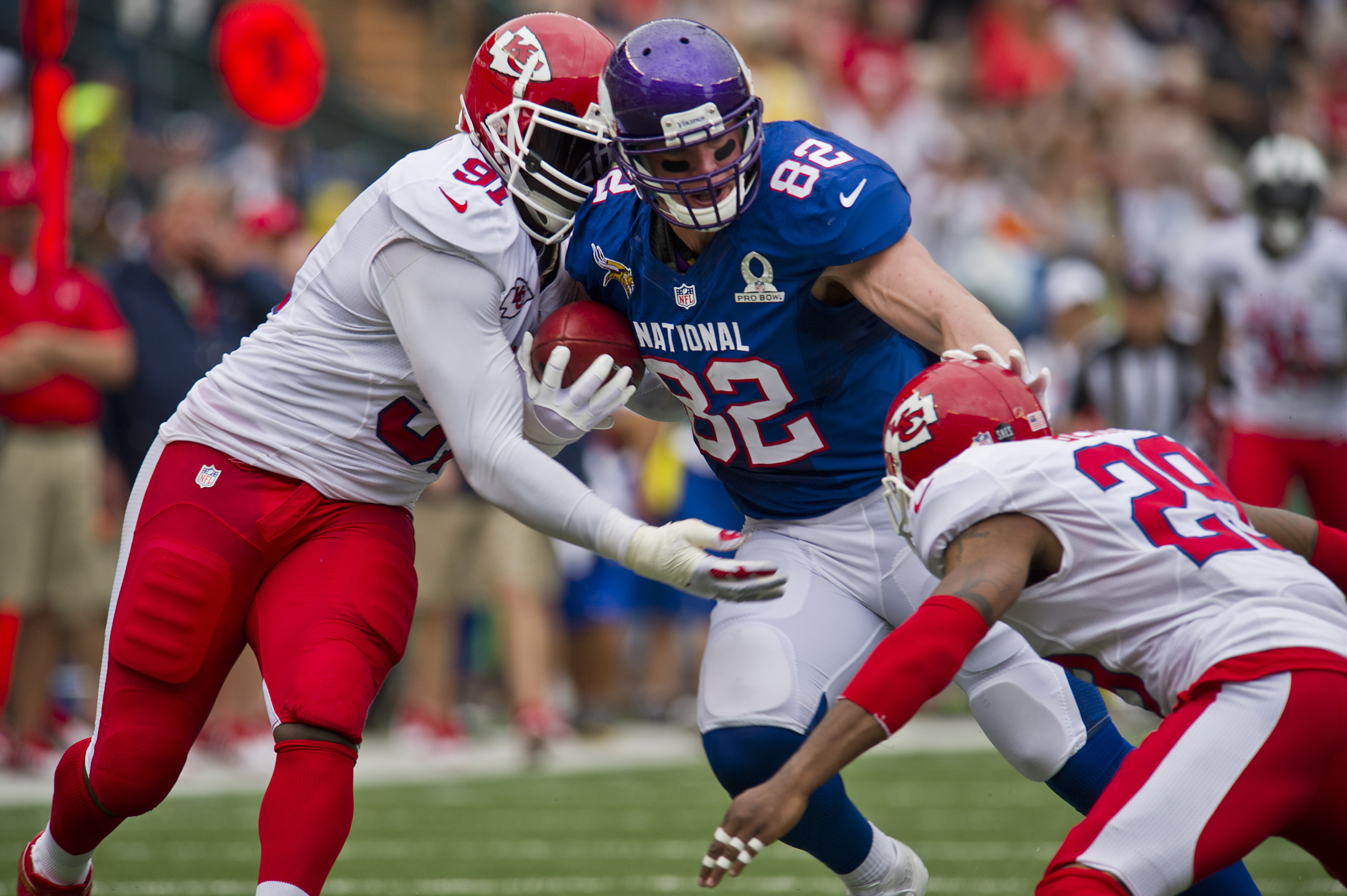
Rudolph at the 2013 Pro Bowl

In 2012, Rudolph had, in many ways, a breakout year. He was targeted 93 times and had 53 receptions averaging 9.3 yards per reception. Rudolph finished the year with 493 receiving yards and a career-high nine touchdowns, the second-most by a Vikings tight end in a season in team history. His nine touchdown catches, which is a career-high, were also tied for second-most by a tight end in the NFL in 2012. In the season-opener against the Jacksonville Jaguars on September 9, he had a then career-best 67 receiving yards on five receptions. On September 16, he hauled in a six-yard touchdown pass with only 31 seconds remaining in the game versus the Indianapolis Colts to tie the game 20–20 after being down 20–6 entering the 4th quarter of game that Colts won on a late field goal 23–20. In week 3, he had a career-best two touchdown catches in the Vikings' win at San Francisco, matching the Vikings single-game best by a tight end. In week 6, he caught a touchdown pass and a 2-point conversion pass against the Washington Redskins. The Vikings finished with a 10–6 record and qualified for the playoffs. In the Wild Card Round against the Green Bay Packers, he finished with three receptions for 42 yards in the 24–10 loss.

Rudolph was selected for his first Pro Bowl in his career at the conclusion of the season as a replacement for Falcons tight end Tony Gonzalez. At the end of the game he was named Pro Bowl MVP.

==== 2013 season ====
Rudolph had his promising season cut short by injury after hauling in 30 catches for 313 yards and three touchdowns in the opening eight games of the season. He was placed on injured reserve on December 9 after being inactive for 5 games following a foot injury suffered against the Dallas Cowboys, when he caught a 31-yard touchdown, his longest play of the season, and injured his foot on the play. He caught his first touchdown of the season on a 20-yarder from Christian Ponder in the Vikings' loss at Chicago in week 2. In week 6 against the Carolina Panthers, he had a season-best 9 catches for 97 yards, including a 23-yard touchdown.

==== 2014 season ====
On July 27, Rudolph and the Vikings agreed to a five-year extension worth $36.5 million. He opened the season with a seven-yard touchdown reception from Matt Cassel in the Vikings' blowout win over the St. Louis Rams on September 7. On September 22, it was announced that Rudolph would undergo surgery for a sports hernia, requiring seven weeks to recover. He posted a season-high seven receptions and 69 receiving yards in a loss at Detroit on December 14. His second touchdown of the season came against the Carolina Panthers on the opening drive on a 4-yard toss from Teddy Bridgewater. Overall, Rudolph appeared in nine games, making eight starts and finishing the season with 24 receptions for 231 yards and two touchdowns.

==== 2015 season ====
In 2015, Rudolph started all 16 games for the second time in his career. He posted a career-high 495 yards receiving and had the second-best totals of his career in receptions with 49 and five touchdowns. Due to a weak Vikings' offensive line, Rudolph was asked to block often and helped clear the way for Adrian Peterson to lead the NFL in rushing with 1,485 yards on the ground. In Week 2 against the Detroit Lions, he caught 5 passes for 30 yards and a touchdown. Rudolph set a single-game career high with 106 yards receiving against the Green Bay Packers on November 22, including a career-long 47-yard touchdown. The following week, he caught a season-high seven passes in the win against the Atlanta Falcons. Overall, he finished the 2015 season with 49 receptions for 495 receiving yards and five receiving touchdowns. In the Wild Card Round loss against the Seattle Seahawks, he moved the chains with a 24-yard reception late in the fourth quarter that led to the infamous Blair Walsh' missed field goal.

==== 2016 season ====
In Week 2 of the regular season, Rudolph caught a touchdown pass in the end zone, (the first for Sam Bradford as a Viking) in the 17–14 win over the Green Bay Packers. In the Vikings' upset of the 2015 NFC champions Carolina Panthers in Week 3, Rudolph was one of the few bright spots for a Vikings' offense that struggled to move the ball in the first half, catching seven passes for 70 yards and a touchdown. Against the New York Giants on October 3, Rudolph hauled in five receptions (four of them resulting in first downs) for 55 yards and a touchdown. In Week 13 against the Jacksonville Jaguars, Rudolph hauled in his sixth touchdown of the season and 28th of his career, placing him in a tie with Vikings legend Steve Jordan for the most by a tight end in franchise history. In Week 17 against the Chicago Bears, Rudolph saw 15 passes thrown his way, hauling in 11 for 117 yards (including a touchdown) to set the franchise record for most receptions in a season for a tight end with 83. Overall, in the 2016 season, he finished with 83 receptions for 840 yards and seven touchdowns.

==== 2017 season ====
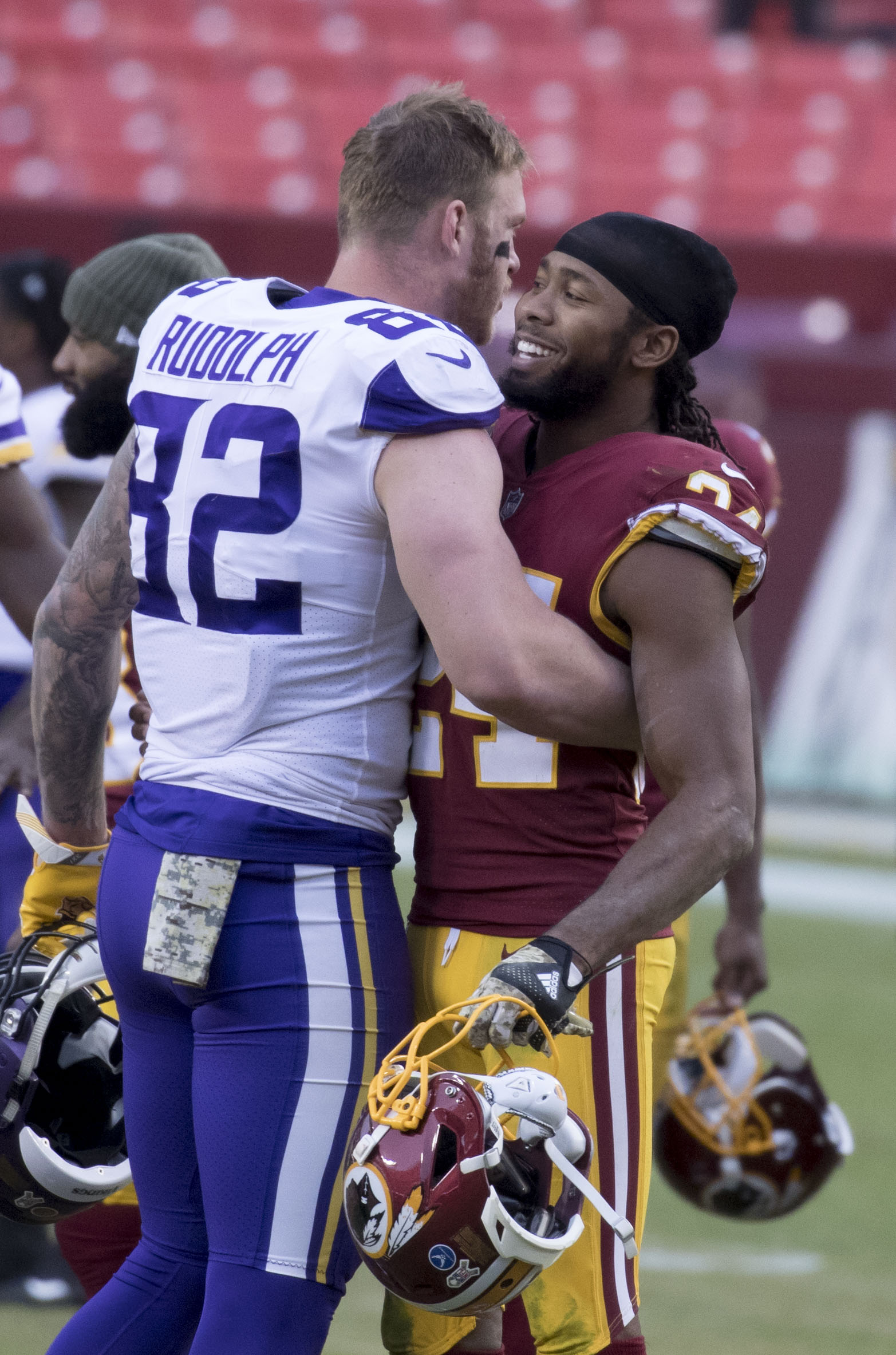
Rudolph and Josh Norman in 2017

In 2017, Rudolph started all 16 games, recording 57 catches for 532 yards and eight touchdowns. The Vikings finished with a 13–3 record atop the NFC North and made it to the NFC Championship. He had a 25-yard touchdown reception on the first drive of the game, which proved to be the Vikings' only score as they went on to lose 38–7 to the eventual Super Bowl champion Philadelphia Eagles. On January 22, 2018, he was named to his second Pro Bowl.

==== 2018 season ====
In Week 1 of the 2018 season, Rudolph scored a touchdown, his first with new quarterback Kirk Cousins, in the victory over the San Francisco 49ers. In Week 16, against the Detroit Lions, he caught a Hail Mary for a touchdown before the end of the half. On the day, he had nine receptions for 122 yards and two touchdowns in the 27–9 victory. In the 2018 season, he had 64 receptions for 634 yards and scored four touchdowns.

==== 2019 season ====
After Rudolph was involved in trade rumors throughout the offseason, the Vikings signed Rudolph to a four-year, $36 million contract extension on June 10, 2019.

In Week 10 against the Dallas Cowboys, Rudolph caught four passes for 14 yards and two touchdowns in the 28–24 win. In Week 11 against the Denver Broncos, Rudolph caught five passes for a season high 67 yards and a touchdown in the 27–23 comeback win. Overall, Rudolph finished the 2019 season with 39 receptions for 367 receiving yards and six receiving touchdowns.

In the NFC Wild Card Round against the New Orleans Saints, Rudolph caught four passes for 31 yards, including the game-winning touchdown in overtime, during the 26–20 win.

==== 2020 season ====
In Week 10 against the Chicago Bears on Monday Night Football, after Rudolph recorded his first catch he fumbled the football while being tackled by linebacker Danny Trevathan and the ball was recovered by safety Tashaun Gipson. This was Rudolph's first career lost fumble in his 137-game career. He later recorded a season high four catches for 63 yards during the 19–13 win. On December 29, 2020, Rudolph was placed on injured reserve. He finished the 2020 season with 28 receptions for 334 receiving yards and one receiving touchdown.

On March 2, 2021, Rudolph was released by the Vikings. They designated him as a post-June 1 cut to reduce the amount of dead money his contract would have put against the reduced salary cap for the 2021 season.

=== New York Giants ===
Rudolph signed with the New York Giants on March 24, 2021. On December 21, 2021, the New York Giants restructured Rudolph's contract to create cap space. He finished the 2021 season with 26 receptions for 257 receiving yards and one receiving touchdown. He was released on March 2, 2022.

=== Tampa Bay Buccaneers ===
On July 20, 2022, Rudolph signed with the Tampa Bay Buccaneers on a one-year deal.

Rudolph's 50th touchdown reception happened to be Tom Brady's final regular-season touchdown pass. In the same game, Rudolph injured his knee and was sidelined for the following playoff game, and remained unsigned after becoming a free agent in the off-season.

=== Retirement ===
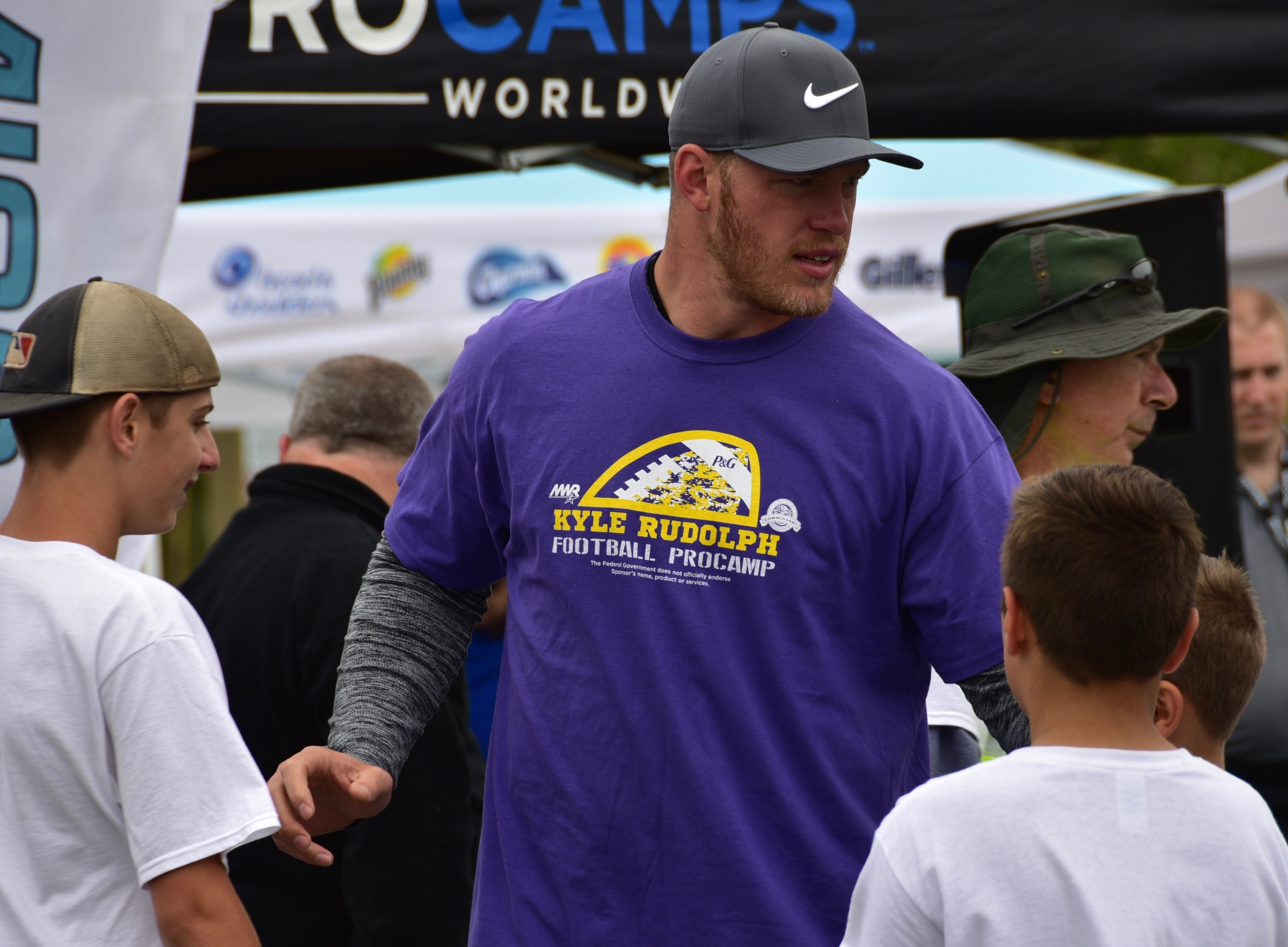
Rudolph at his football camp in 2018

On September 4, 2023, Rudolph announced his retirement from professional football. Rudolph began working as a Big Ten analyst for Peacock, and co-hosts a Sunday night show on Fox Sports Radio starting in the fall of 2023.

=== Philanthropy ===
In 2021, Rudolph co-founded the charitable sweepstakes company Alltroo with NHL left wing Jason Zucker. The company lets users support charitable causes and receive entries to win prizes in the form of experiences or vehicles, often with celebrities or athletes attached.

== Career statistics ==
=== NFL ===
Regular season statistics
Year	Team	Games		Receiving						
Year	Team	GP	GS	Rec	Yds	Avg	Y/G	Lng	TD	FD
2011	MIN	15	8	26	356	9.6	25.1	41	3	15
2012	MIN	16	16	53	493	9.3	30.8	29	9	34
2013	MIN	8	8	30	313	10.4	39.1	31	3	13
2014	MIN	9	8	24	231	9.6	25.7	23	2	13
2015	MIN	16	16	49	495	10.1	30.9	47	5	25
2016	MIN	16	16	83	840	10.1	52.5	44	7	50
2017	MIN	16	16	57	532	9.3	33.3	34	8	32
2018	MIN	16	16	64	634	9.9	39.6	44	4	32
2019	MIN	16	16	39	367	9.4	22.9	32	6	24
2020	MIN	12	12	28	334	11.9	27.8	25	1	16
2021	NYG	16	13	26	257	9.9	16.1	60	1	12
2022	TB	9	0	3	28	9.3	3.1	12	1	2
Career		165	145	482	4,773	9.9	28.9	60	50	268

Postseason statistics
Year	Team	Games		Receiving						
Year	Team	GP	GS	Rec	Yds	Avg	Y/G	Lng	TD	FD
2012	MIN	1	1	3	42	14.0	42.0	23	0	2
2015	MIN	1	1	1	24	24.0	24.0	24	0	1
2017	MIN	2	2	6	53	8.8	26.5	25	1	2
2019	MIN	2	2	6	35	5.8	17.5	13	1	2
Career		6	6	16	154	9.6	25.7	25	2	7

=== College ===
Season	Team	Games		Receiving				
Season	Team	GP	GS	Rec	Rec	Avg	Lng	TD
2008	Notre Dame	13	13	29	340	11.7	29	2
2009	Notre Dame	10	9	33	364	11.0	52	3
2010	Notre Dame	6	6	28	328	11.7	95	3
Total		29	28	90	1,032	11.5	95	8

== Personal life ==
Rudolph's cousin, Patrick Overmyer, plays as a tight end for the Houston Cougars.
