= Chrishon Rose =

American football player (born 1991)

No. 64
- Position: Defensive tackle

Personal information
- Born: March 13, 1991 (age 35); Washington D.C., U.S.
- Listed height: 6 ft 4 in (1.93 m)
- Listed weight: 303 lb (137 kg)

Career information
- High school: Bishop McNamara (MD)
- College: East Carolina
- NFL draft: 2015: undrafted

Career history
- Minnesota Vikings (2015)*
- * Offseason or practice squad member only

Chrishon Rose (born March 13, 1991) is an American former football defensive tackle. He played college football at East Carolina University. He was signed by the Minnesota Vikings as a rookie free agent following the 2015 NFL draft.

== Early life ==
Rose attended Bishop McNamara High School in Forestville, Maryland, where he played for Coach Bryce Bevill, recognized by sports website DCSportsFan.com's Coach of the Year. He was part of a defense that shut out three opponents during the 2009 season. He was a second-team All-Washington Catholic Athletic Conference selection as a senior following an honorable mention nod as a junior. As a senior, he logged 32 tackles, 10 coming behind the line of scrimmage, helping lead the Mustangs to an 8–3 record and a league playoff berth, earning an honorable mention Big School All-State for his efforts. He was also named to the Star-Gazette second-team as a senior. Following his senior season, he played for the Washington squad in the Maryland Crab Bowl, the state's only high school all-star game, and was credited with five tackles.

Rose also competed in wrestling for Bishop McNamara, finishing eighth in the state and third in the conference (in heavyweight division). He also earned an additional two letters in basketball.

== College career ==
Rose played for the ECU Pirates football team from 2010 to 2014. A four-year letter winner, Rose played in 48 total games for the Pirates. He booked multiple tackles in 16 of 35 contests and was considered a vital member of a defensive unit that has held 11 opponents to 100 or less rushing yards over the last three seasons.

He received honorable mention All-Conference USA recognition following the 2013 season when he logged 31 tackles and 2.5 sacks.

As a senior, he played in 13 games during the 2014 campaign, posting 41 total tackles, including 14 solo stops.

== Professional career ==
Pre-draft measurables
Height	Weight	40-yard dash	10-yard split	20-yard split	20-yard shuttle	Three-cone drill	Vertical jump	Broad jump	Bench press
6 ft 2 in (1.88 m)	299 lb (136 kg)	5.05 s	1.75 s	2.89 s	4.62 s	7.90 s	25.5 in (0.65 m)	8 ft 9 in (2.67 m)	20 reps
All values from Pro Day

Rose went undrafted in the 2015 NFL draft. On June 9, 2015, the Minnesota Vikings signed Rose as a rookie free agent to fill out the 90-man roster.

== Personal life ==
The Washington, D.C. native earned a bachelor's degree in business management during ECU's Spring Commencement Exercises in May 2014. In addition to football, Rose is also a musician, and a member of Washington, D.C. band Xtreme Intentionz (XIB).
