= Dominique Williams =

American gridiron football player (born 1990)

No. 17
- Position: Running back

Personal information
- Born: September 2, 1990 (age 36); Bridgeton, New Jersey, U.S.
- Listed height: 5 ft 9 in (1.75 m)
- Listed weight: 205 lb (93 kg)

Career information
- High school: Bridgeton (NJ)
- College: Wagner
- NFL draft: 2014: undrafted

Career history
- Minnesota Vikings (2014)*; Arizona Cardinals (2014)*; Minnesota Vikings (2014–2015)*; New York Jets (2016)*; Calgary Stampeders (2017–2018)*
- * Offseason or practice squad member only
- Stats at Pro Football Reference
- Stats at CFL.ca

Dominique Williams (born September 2, 1990) is an American former professional football running back. He was signed by the Minnesota Vikings as an undrafted free agent in 2014. He played college football at Wagner College.

== Early life ==
Williams started out his high school football career at Bridgeton High School, idolizing former Baltimore Ravens linebacker Ray Lewis, and dreaming of following in his footsteps on defense. After starting his first 2 seasons at middle linebacker for Bridgeton High, Williams officially switched to running back his junior year, piling up 2,786 yards over his final 2 seasons. As a senior, he rushed for 1,321 yards on 216 carries (average of 6.2 yards per carry) with a long of 52 yards and eight touchdowns. He spent a year after high school prepping at Milford Academy in New Berlin, New York

Williams was also a standout in track & field at Bridgeton. In 2007, he got a top-throw of 16.52 meters (54 feet, 2 inches) in the shot put at the South Jersey Invitational. As a senior, he recorded a personal-best time of 8.38 seconds in the 55m hurdles at the 2008 NJSIAA Sectional Meet. He finished first in the javelin at the Cape-Atlantic League Championship with a personal-best throw of 52.3 meters (171 feet, 6 inches). He also got personal-bests of 14.94 seconds in the 110m hurdles and 42.95 meters (140 feet, 9 inches) in the discus at the NJSIAA State Meet.

Williams drew no interest from major universities coming out of high school. However, after transferring to Milford Academy, he drew interest from many Division I-A and I-AA colleges, with the University of Iowa being one of the main schools. After taking an official visit to Iowa, he was later informed that they were not going to offer him a full scholarship. Then, Wagner College called Williams the next day offering a partial scholarship and his family encouraged him to take the offer from Wagner.

== College career ==
Williams ended his career at Wagner College ranked third all-time in the school's history in both rushing yards (4,435) and scoring (276 points). In 43 career games, he rushed for 42 touchdowns and snared four touchdown catches as a receiver out of the backfield, while also rushing for 100 yards or more on 26 occasions. In addition to finishing fourth on the NEC all-time career rushing list, he was fourth in NEC history in all-purpose yards with 5,444.

As a true freshman in 2009, Williams appeared as a starter in eight games, streaking his way for 642 yards and nine touchdowns on 113 attempts (average of 5.7 yards per carry). He also assisted the special teams unit, returning six kickoffs for a gain of 109 yards, and eight punts for a total of 83 yards, finishing the season with 919 all purpose yards.

In 2010, Williams suffered a knee injury on the final day of the 2010 preseason training which required surgery and forced him to sit out for his sophomore season.

Williams was named one of Wagner's four captains during preseason camp in 2011. He gained a team-leading 1,338 yards on 274 rushing attempts (average of 4.9 yards per carry) while finding the end zone 14 times on the ground. The 1,338 yards rushing ranked sixth on the school's all-time single-season rushing list. He scored 90 points on 15 touchdowns (14 rushing, one receiving), which tied for sixth on the Seahawks' all-time single-season scoring list. For the season, he ran for 100 or more yards in eight of Wagner's 11 games, averaging 121.6 yards rushing per game which ranked fourth in the NEC and 11th nationally. He ended the season with four consecutive 100-yard plus rushing days as the Seahawks went 3–1 in those contests.

In 2012, Williams led the team in rushing with 1,328 yards on 263 carries (average of 5.0 yards per carry) while scoring 13 touchdowns on the ground, averaging 102.2 yards rushing per game and rushing for over 100 yards in eight of the Seahawks' 13 games. He was third on the team in receiving with 26 catches for 277 yards and two touchdowns. He also ranked first in the team in all-purpose yards with 1,660. He dashed for a career-long 81-yard carry on his way to 122 yards and two touchdowns in the win at Sacred Heart.

In 2013, Williams became the first three-time captain in Seahawks history, and went on to rush for 1,127 yards. For his senior season efforts, he was named a second-team All-NEC selection.

== Professional career ==
=== Pre-draft ===
Pre-draft measurables
Height	Weight	40-yard dash	10-yard split	20-yard split	20-yard shuttle	Three-cone drill	Vertical jump	Broad jump	Bench press
5 ft 9 in (1.75 m)	205 lb (93 kg)	4.65 s	1.63 s	2.67 s	4.26 s	6.72 s	34.5 in (0.88 m)	10 ft 0 in (3.05 m)	19 reps
All values from Pro Day

=== Minnesota Vikings ===
Williams signed as an undrafted free agent with the Minnesota Vikings on May 10, 2014. In signing with the Vikings, he became the third Seahawk to sign a free agent deal with an NFL team in consecutive years. He participated in the team's rookie minicamp, which was held at the Vikings' Winter Park Facility, from May 15–18.

=== New York Jets ===
Williams signed a reserve/future contract with the New York Jets on January 19, 2016. Williams was waived on September 4, 2016. After clearing waivers, Williams was signed to the team's practice squad two days later. He was released on September 26, 2016.
