= Blair Walsh =

American football player (born 1990)

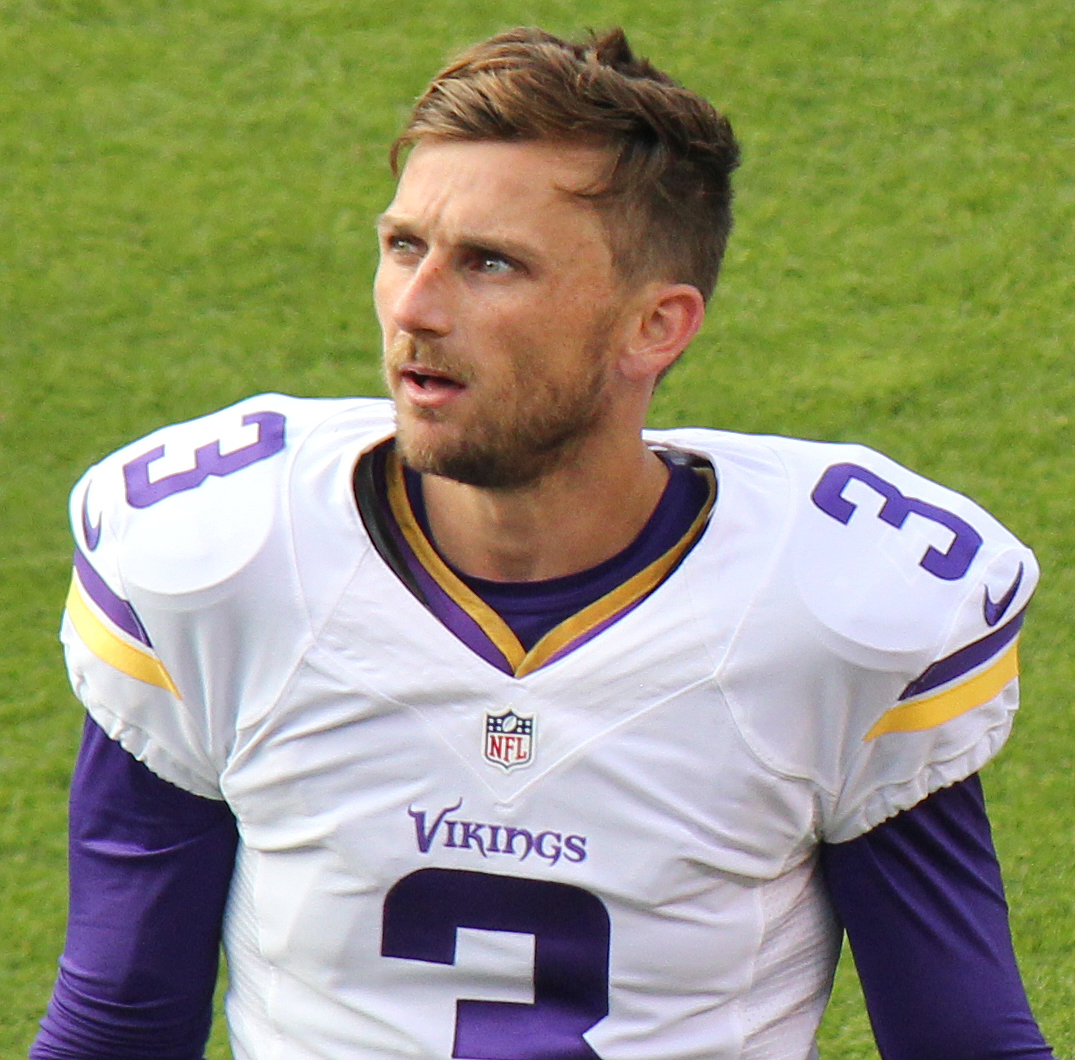
- Walsh with the Minnesota Vikings in 2015

No. 3, 7
- Position: Placekicker

Personal information
- Born: January 8, 1990 (age 36); Boca Raton, Florida, U.S.
- Listed height: 5 ft 10 in (1.78 m)
- Listed weight: 175 lb (79 kg)

Career information
- High school: Cardinal Gibbons (Fort Lauderdale, Florida)
- College: Georgia (2008–2011)
- NFL draft: 2012: 6th round, 175th overall pick

Career history
- Minnesota Vikings (2012–2016); Seattle Seahawks (2017); Atlanta Falcons (2019)*; New Orleans Saints (2020)*
- * Offseason or practice squad member only

Awards and highlights
- First-team All-Pro (2012); Pro Bowl (2012); PFWA All-Rookie Team (2012); First-team All-SEC (2010); Second-team All-SEC (2009)

Career NFL statistics
- Field goals: 154
- Field goal attempts: 187
- Field goal %: 82.4
- Longest field goal: 56
- Touchbacks: 249
- Stats at Pro Football Reference

Blair Richard Walsh (born January 8, 1990) is an American former professional football placekicker who played in the National Football League (NFL) for six seasons, primarily with the Minnesota Vikings. Walsh played college football for the Georgia Bulldogs, receiving first-team All-SEC honors in 2010. He was selected by the Vikings in the sixth round of the 2012 NFL draft.

In his first year, Walsh set the NFL records for the most single-season field goals of 50 or more yards and the highest field goal percentage by a rookie. He also earned Pro Bowl and first-team All-Pro honors. After missing a short game-winning kick during the 2015 playoffs, Walsh struggled the following season and was released from Minnesota. Walsh spent his final season with the Seattle Seahawks.

== Early life ==
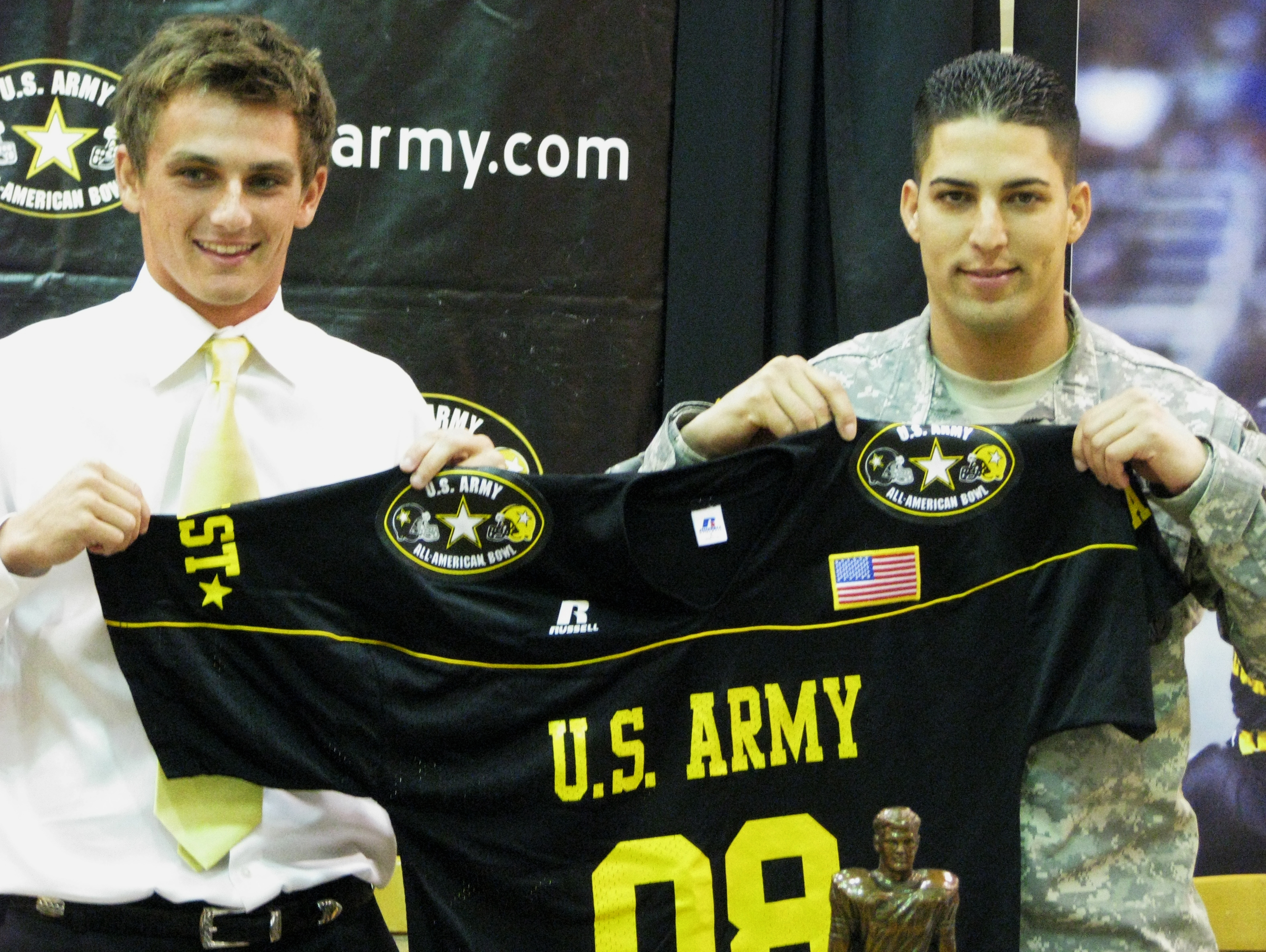
Walsh at the 2008 U.S. Army All-American Bowl

Walsh attended Cardinal Gibbons High School in Fort Lauderdale, Florida, and played football for coach Michael Morill as their punter and placekicker. As a senior, he made 14 of 20 field goal attempts and 30 of 31 extra point attempts. Twice he hit field goals from 59 yards. Walsh also averaged 41 yards per punt and 69 yards per kickoff. For his efforts, he was named to USA Today's All-USA First-team Offense and noted as a top-5 kicker in the nation by ESPN.com. He also played in the 2008 U.S. Army All-American Bowl.

== College career ==
Walsh attended the University of Georgia, where he was a placekicker for coach Mark Richt's Georgia Bulldogs football team from 2008 to 2011. He was a standout player who amassed a number of significant kicking statistics for which he became known as the "Athens Assassin". During his time at Georgia, he made 4 field goals in a game three times. Twice he attempted a field goal from his long, 56 yards, and converted it once in a game against Coastal Carolina in his senior year. In all, Walsh made 184 of 185 PATs and 76 of 103 field goals. However, in his senior year, he made just 21 of 35 field goal attempts. He also had two tackles and one fumble recovery to his credit.

== Professional career ==
Pre-draft measurables
Height	Weight	Arm length	Hand span	Wingspan
5 ft 9 1/4 in (1.76 m)	187 lb (85 kg)	29 3/8 in (0.75 m)	8 3/8 in (0.21 m)	5 ft 10 1/8 in (1.78 m)
All values from NFL Combine

=== Minnesota Vikings ===
==== 2012 season ====
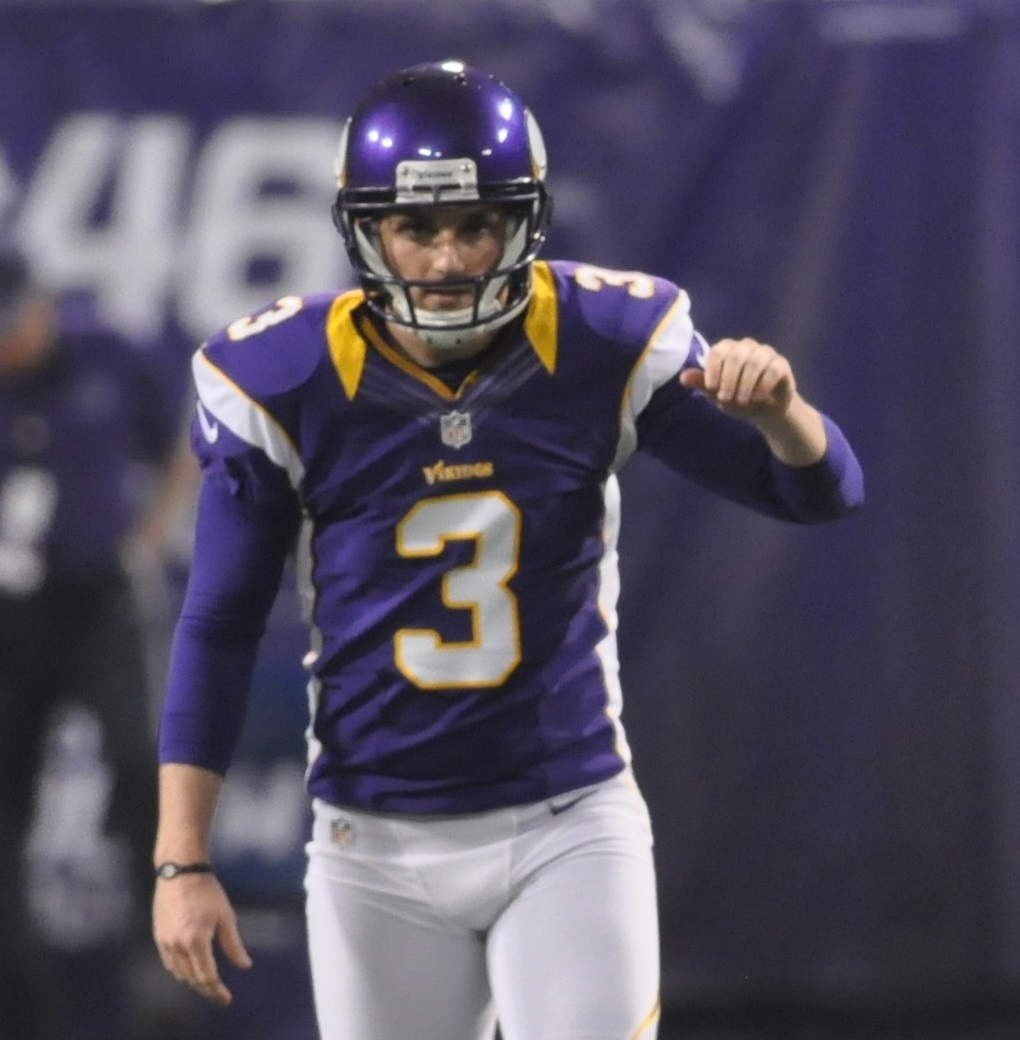
Walsh prepares for a kickoff in 2012

Walsh was selected by the Minnesota Vikings with the fifth pick of the sixth round of the 2012 NFL draft. A priority acquisition for the Vikings, Walsh would take over kicking duties for the released Ryan Longwell. Through the first 11 weeks of the season, Walsh missed only one field goal and had another blocked. He was 6-for-6 with kicks over 50 yards and 21-for-21 on extra point attempts. On December 16, Walsh passed Randy Moss for the Vikings' franchise record in points scored by a rookie (119). In his best week of his rookie season, in a game against the St. Louis Rams in week 15, Walsh equalled the NFL record for field goals made from 50 yards or more with his eighth kick (a new team record); his three 50-yarders in the game was also a team record. His 5 kicks also tied an NFL record for most field goals of 37 yards or more in a single game, 5, which only Chris Boniol equaled for the Cowboys in 1996 and Scott Norwood in 1988. The next week in a game against the Houston Texans on December 23, 2012, Walsh completed a 56-yard attempt, setting the NFL record for field goals over 50 yards in a season with his ninth 50+ yarder. The 56-yarder also tied the Vikings record of longest field goal set by Paul Edinger in 2005. It was broken by Greg Joseph with a walk-off 61-yard kick on December 24, 2022.

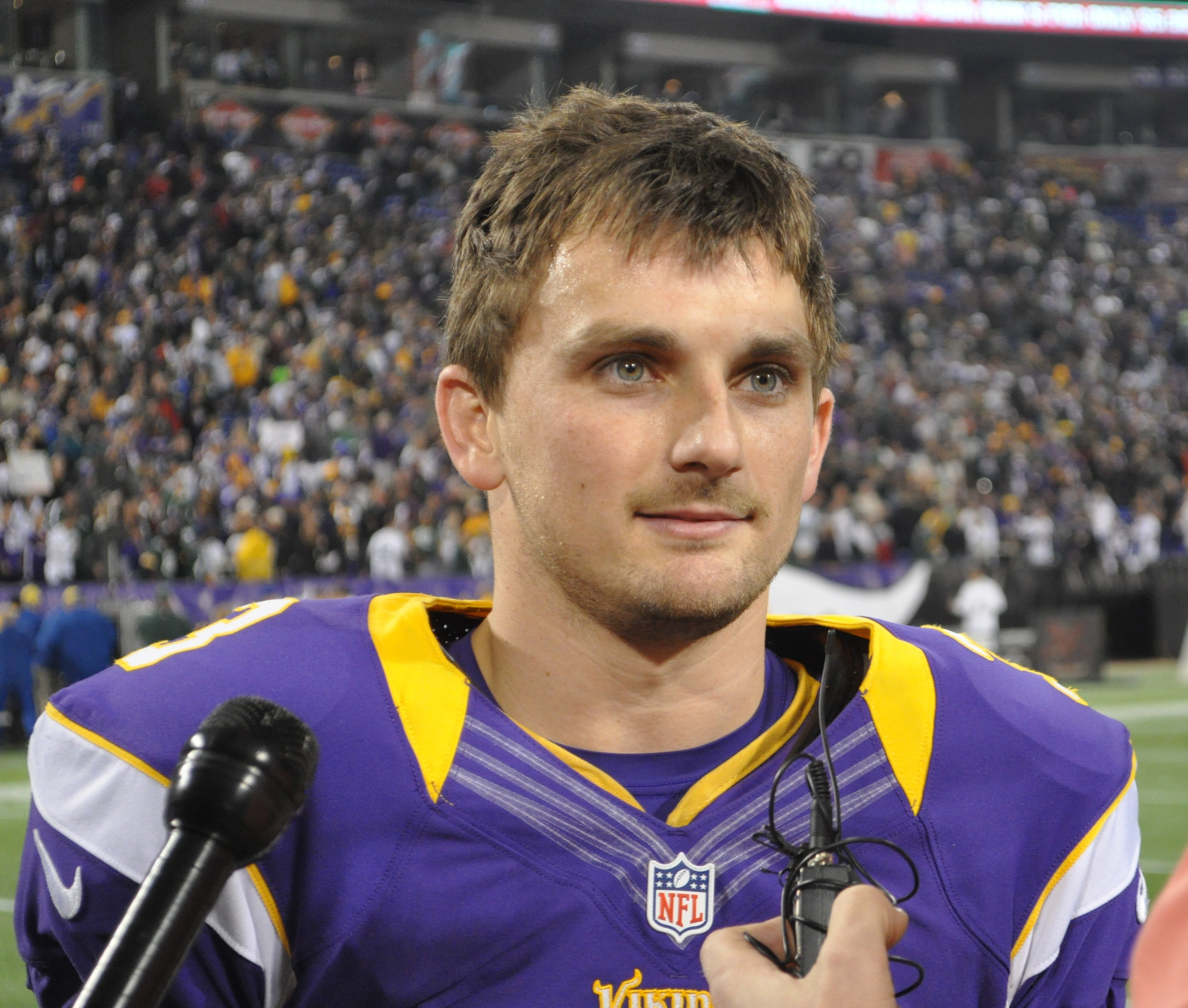
Walsh speaks with the media after a game-winner against the Packers.

In the final game of the 2012 season, Walsh completed a 54-yard field goal to make himself 10/10 over 50 yards on the season. He was 3 points short of tying an NFL record for most points in a season by a rookie at 144, Walsh ended 2012 with 141 points for the Vikings; which is the team record. His final regular season field goal allowed the Vikings to beat the Green Bay Packers 37–34 and earn a playoff berth. The field goal also tied the NFL record for most field goals by a rookie kicker at 35 with Ali Haji-Sheikh from 1983.

As reward for his standout rookie season, Walsh was selected for the NFC team in the 2013 Pro Bowl. Walsh was also selected to the All-Pro 1st Team. He was named to the PFWA All-Rookie Team.

==== 2013 season ====
In the 2013 season opener against the Detroit Lions, Walsh tied the record for most consecutive 50 yard or more field goals with eleven, tying with Robbie Gould and Tony Zendejas. Walsh broke the record three weeks later against the Pittsburgh Steelers in London, England with his twelfth straight 50+ yard field goal. On November 24 against the Green Bay Packers Walsh hit four of four field goals and had five touchbacks off kickoffs; he was named NFC special teams player of the week.

==== 2015 season ====
In July, Walsh signed a four-year contract extension worth up to $14 million, including $5.25 million guaranteed, making him one of the top-five highest-paid kickers in the NFL. He struggled in the preseason, making only five of eleven field goal attempts. Walsh missed a 36-yard field goal attempt in a 20–23 loss to the Denver Broncos in week 4. He picked himself up by converting seventeen consecutive field goals from week 4 in Denver through week 10 in Oakland, where he missed a 53-yarder that ended his streak. During this span, Walsh kicked back-to-back game-winning field goals: a 36-yarder against the Chicago Bears in week 8 and a 40-yarder in week 9 against the St. Louis Rams in overtime. Walsh has made five out of five field goal attempts on two occasions: week 7 against the Detroit Lions and week 16 against the New York Giants, including two 50+ yard field goals in each. For his efforts after scoring 19 points in Minnesota's 49–17 win over the Giants, Walsh was named NFC Special Teams Player of the Week.

In the Vikings' 20–13 win over the Green Bay Packers in week 17, Walsh converted both of his field goal attempts, giving him a total of 34 made field goals, the most among kickers in the 2015 NFL season.

In the Vikings' first playoff game since 2013 against the Seattle Seahawks on January 10, 2016, in a game played in freezing weather, Walsh was 3-for-3 on field goals before missing a game-winning 27-yard attempt in the fourth quarter with 26 seconds remaining. Walsh hooked the short attempt wide left, and the Vikings lost the game by a score of 10–9.

==== 2016 season ====
Walsh struggled through the first ten weeks of the 2016 season, missing four extra points along with four field goal attempts. He missed an extra point in a 26–20 Week 10 loss to the Washington Redskins which led to his release from the Vikings on November 15, 2016.

=== Seattle Seahawks ===
After his release from Minnesota, on February 9, 2017, Walsh signed with the Seattle Seahawks.

Walsh gained national attention during his second preseason game where the Seahawks beat the Minnesota Vikings, his former team, 20–13. He went 2-of-3 on field goals of over 50 yards and converted both extra point attempts during the game. After his two successful field goals, he was seen pointing at Vikings head coach Mike Zimmer and his former Viking teammates for being taunted and having profanity yelled at him during all of his extra points and field goals. At one point, Richard Sherman joined in to show his support and respect for his new teammate.

In the season opening 17–9 loss to the Green Bay Packers, Walsh converted three field goals in his Seahawks debut. Although he was 12 of 13 on field goals and 16 of 17 on extra points by November, Walsh missed three field goals in the first half against the Washington Redskins; the Seahawks went on to lose 17–14. A week later, he made two field goals and two extra points in a 22–16 win against the Arizona Cardinals.

On November 20, against the Atlanta Falcons, Walsh made three field goals before coming up a foot short on 52 yard game-tying field goal with 2 seconds left, and Seattle fell short in their comeback, 34–31. Against the Philadelphia Eagles, he made a 46-yard field goal on the Seahawks' opening drive to make it 3–0 and made three extra points in a 24–10 win against the Eagles that pushed the Seahawks to 8–4 in the season.

As the Seahawks were playing for a spot in the playoffs against the Cardinals, Walsh made a 49-yard field goal early in the fourth quarter. With less than a minute remaining, Walsh missed a field goal, costing the Seahawks the game 26–24. Earlier that day, the Atlanta Falcons had won their game against the Carolina Panthers, so even if Walsh had made the go-ahead kick, the Seahawks still would have missed the playoffs.

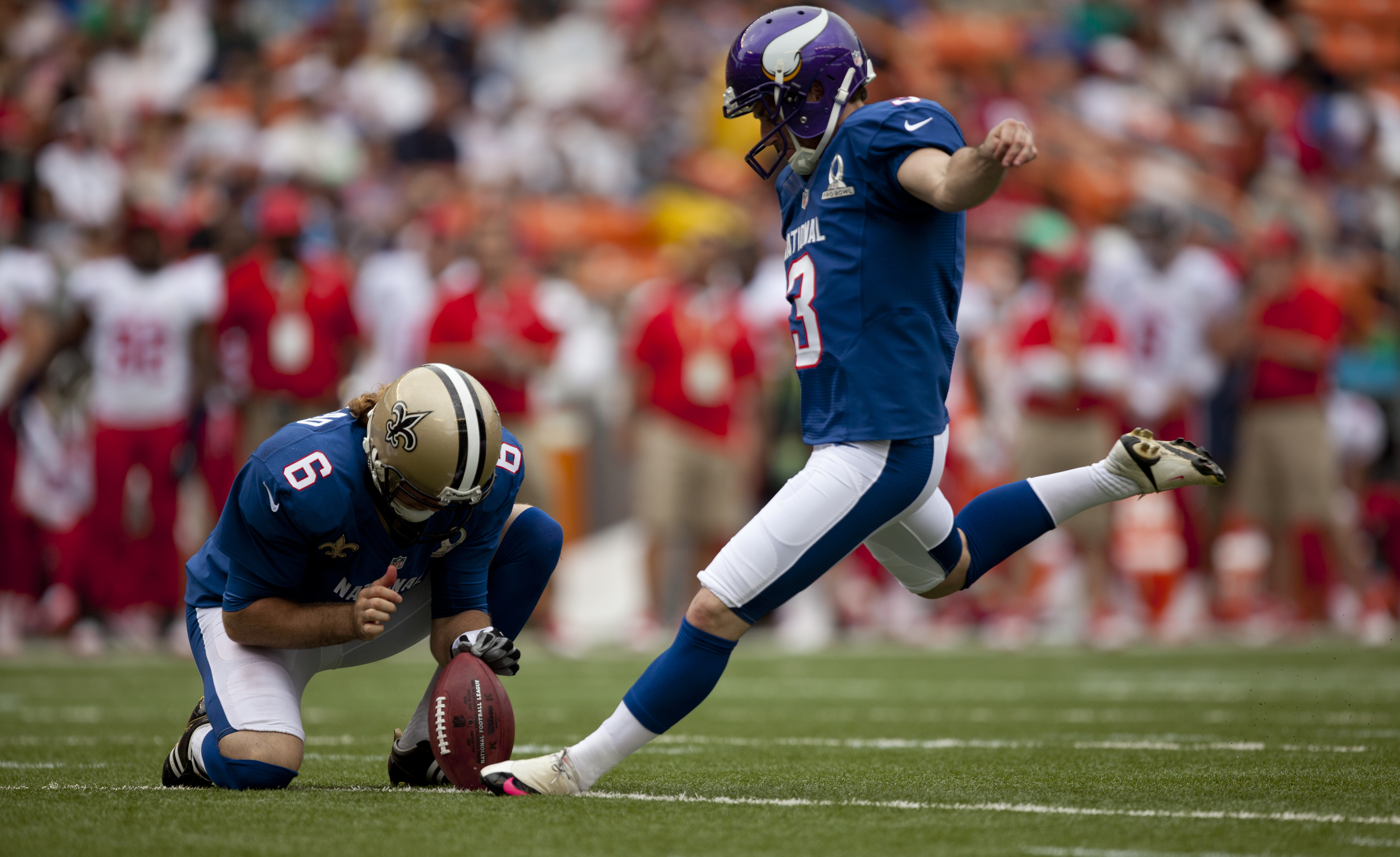
Walsh kicks a field goal in the 2013 Pro Bowl.

Due to Walsh's unsatisfactory performance in the 2017 NFL season, the Seahawks signed former Jacksonville Jaguars place kicker Jason Myers. The Seattle Times said, "The signing of Myers could be the first step in Seattle reshaping its kicking units in 2018."

=== Atlanta Falcons ===
On August 24, 2019, Walsh signed with the Atlanta Falcons. He was waived by the Falcons on August 31, as a part of final roster cuts.

=== New Orleans Saints ===
On January 11, 2021, the New Orleans Saints signed Walsh to their practice squad to serve as a reserve kicker in the event that incumbent kicker Wil Lutz was unable to perform during their postseason run. On January 13, Walsh was released by the Saints, but was re-signed to the team's practice squad on January 16. His practice squad contract with the team expired after the season on January 25.

== NFL career statistics ==
Legend
	NFL record
	Led the league
**Bold**	Career high

=== Regular season ===
Year	Team	GP	Field Goals									Extra Points			Total Points
Year	Team	GP	FGM	FGA	FG%	<20	20−29	30−39	40−49	50+	Lng	XPM	XPA	XP%	Total Points
2012	MIN	16	**35**	38	**92.1**	0−0	**10−10**	8−9	7−9	**10−10**	**56**	36	36	**100.0**	**141**
2013	MIN	16	26	30	86.7	0−0	7−7	12−12	5−6	2−5	54	**43**	**44**	97.7	121
2014	MIN	16	26	35	74.3	**2−2**	4−5	8−10	7−9	5−9	55	29	29	**100.0**	107
2015	MIN	16	34	**39**	87.2	0−0	9−9	**13−15**	6−7	6−8	54	33	37	89.2	135
2016	MIN	9	12	16	75.0	1−1	1−1	5−6	4−6	1−2	50	15	19	78.9	51
2017	SEA	16	21	29	72.4	0−0	6−6	7−10	**8−11**	0−1	49	37	38	97.3	100
Career		89	154	187	82.4	3−3	37−38	53−63	37−48	24−35	56	193	203	95.1	655

=== Postseason ===
Year	Team	GP	Field Goals			Extra Points			Total Points
Year	Team	GP	FGM	FGA	FG%	XPM	XPA	XP%	Total Points
2012	MIN	1	1	1	**100.0**	**1**	**1**	**100.0**	4
2015	MIN	1	**3**	**4**	75.0	0	0	0.0	**9**
Career		2	4	5	80.0	1	1	100.0	13

=== Awards ===
==== NFL honors ====
- 2012 AP All-Pro First-team: Only rookie selected
- 2014 Pro Football Focus All-NFC North Kicker of the Year

==== NFL records ====
- Most field goals of 50 yards or more made in a season without missing – 10 (2012) (tied with Brandon Aubrey)
- Most consecutive field goals of 50 yards or more made - 12 (2012–2013)

==== Vikings franchise records ====
- Most field goals of 50 yards or more made in a season – 10 (2012)
- Longest field goal attempt – 68 yards (2014)
- Most field goals of 50 yards or more in a season – 10 (2012)
- Most field goals of 50 yards or more without missing in a season – 10 (2012)
- Most field goals of 50 yards or more in a game – 3 (December 26, 2012)
- Most field goals of 50 yards or more – 24
- Most consecutive field goals made of 50+ yards – 12 (2012–2013)
- Highest FG% by a rookie kicker – 92.1% (2012)
- Most points by a rookie in a single season – 141 (2012)
- Most career touchbacks – 187
- Most touchbacks in a season – 53 (2012)
