= Andrew Sendejo =

American football player (born 1987)

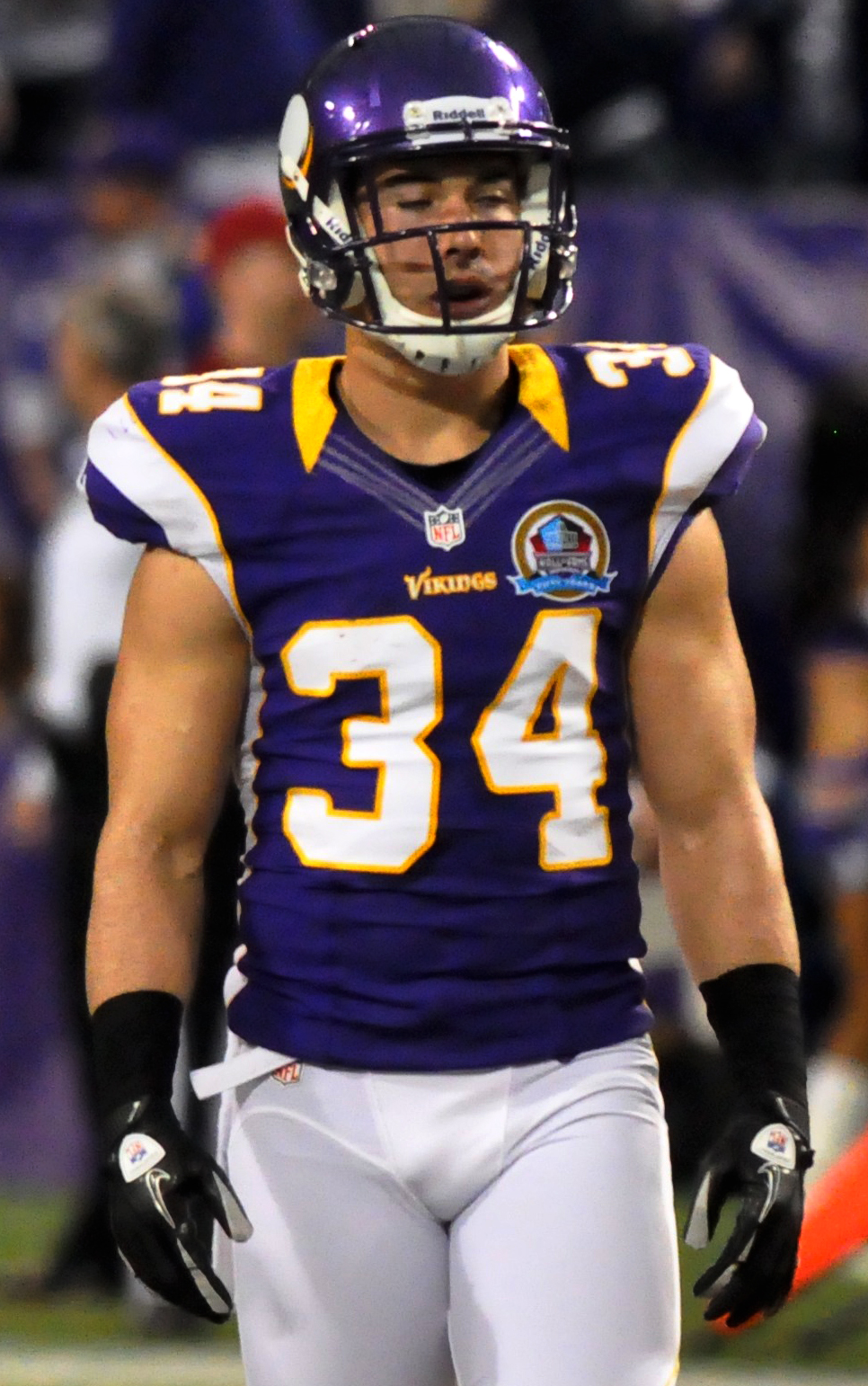
- Sendejo with the Minnesota Vikings in 2012

No. 36, 34, 42, 23
- Position: Safety

Personal information
- Born: September 9, 1987 (age 39); Bulverde, Texas, U.S.
- Listed height: 6 ft 1 in (1.85 m)
- Listed weight: 210 lb (95 kg)

Career information
- High school: Smithson Valley (Spring Branch, Texas)
- College: Rice (2006–2009)
- NFL draft: 2010: undrafted

Career history
- Sacramento Mountain Lions (2010); Dallas Cowboys (2010); New York Jets (2011); Minnesota Vikings (2011–2018); Philadelphia Eagles (2019); Minnesota Vikings (2019); Cleveland Browns (2020); Indianapolis Colts (2021)

Career NFL statistics
- Total tackles: 523
- Sacks: 2
- Forced fumbles: 3
- Fumble recoveries: 4
- Pass deflections: 25
- Interceptions: 9
- Stats at Pro Football Reference

Andrew Victor Sendejo (born September 9, 1987) is an American former professional football player who was a safety in the National Football League (NFL). He played college football for the Rice Owls, and was signed by the Sacramento Mountain Lions of the United Football League (UFL) as a free agent in 2010. Sendejo was also in uniform for the Dallas Cowboys, New York Jets, Philadelphia Eagles, Minnesota Vikings, Cleveland Browns, and Indianapolis Colts.

== Early life ==
Sendejo is a 2006 graduate of Smithson Valley High School in Spring Branch, northeast of San Antonio, Texas. He was a two-time All-San Antonio area selection for coach Larry Hill. Also a two-time honorable mention All-State pick, and a two-time All-District 26-5A honoree. As a senior, he had 75 tackles (3 for loss), four interceptions, eight pass deflections, one forced fumble and one fumble recovery, helping lead the Rangers to a 13–2 record and the Class 5A semifinals. He was named Comal County defensive player of the year for his senior season efforts. He was also a regional finalist and academic All-district. Sendejo selected Rice over Tulane, Army, North Texas, Northwestern and New Mexico.

In addition to football, Sendejo also lettered in soccer, where he was twice a second-team All-district selection and academic All-district pick, helping Smithson Valley to the district and bi-district championships. He also participated in track & field for the Rangers; at the 2004 District 27-5A Championships, he placed third in the 400-meter dash (52.80 seconds), sixth in the triple jump (12.04m or 39'4") and fifth in the pole vault (3.53m or 11'6"). As a junior in 2005, he posted a personal-best time of 52.02 seconds in the 400-meter dash at the Texas State High School Invitational.

== College career ==
At Rice, Sendejo saw his senior season come to an early conclusion after suffering a severe high ankle sprain at East Carolina that required surgery. He was a Preseason All C-USA pick by conference coaches and a three-year starter who opened the season as the national leader among active players in solo tackles and also ranked in the top 10 among active players in career total tackles, career interceptions and interception returns for touchdowns. He was a Second-team All C-USA preseason selection by the media in a poll conducted by the New Orleans Times-Picayune. He also earned an Honorable Mention All C-USA honors from league coaches even with a shortened senior season, and was named one of 12 finalist for the 2009 Wuerffel Trophy, which honors the college football player who best combines exemplary community service with outstanding academic and athletic achievement. He was a three-time ESPN The Magazine District VI academic honoree as well as a three-time C-USA All Academic Football team with a 3.55 GPA in sports management.

=== 2006 season ===
A starter from the first whistle of the season who went on to earn honorable mention freshman All-American recognition from The Sporting News and C-USA all-freshman honors from the media, Sendejo made 10 starts on the season in 11 played games, missing just the UAB game with an injury. He finished fifth on the team with 49 total tackles from the Spur position, tied for fourth on the squad with seven tackles for loss and was second on the team by forcing three fumbles. He forced one fumble and recovered a second to set up a touchdown for the Owls against Tulsa. He opened the season with a 13-yard sack of Kevin Kolb of Houston and closed it with a seven-yard sack of Justin Willis of SMU.

=== 2007 season ===
As a sophomore in 2007, Sendejo led the team with 107 tackles and five interceptions. His five interceptions were the most by an Owl since Dan Dawson tied the school record with seven in 2000 and match the third-best total by an Owl in a season. He earned honorable mention All C-USA honors by the coaches and third-team All conference mention by Phil Steele. Also named Academic All-Conference and All-District VI for his work in the classroom as well. He closed the season strongly, registering back-to-back double figure tackle efforts against Tulane (11) and Tulsa (13). He posted four double figure games on the season, including a career-best 18-tackle day at Marshall, the most by an Owl since Jeff Vanover was credited with 18 against SMU in 2001. He was named C-USA Defensive Player of the Week against Southern Miss after picking off a pair of passes, forcing a fumble, and registering seven tackles, becoming the first Owl to pick off more than one pass in a game since Dan Dawson picked off three vs. Hawaii back in 2000. He was credited with eight tackles, shared a tackle for loss, forced and recovered a fumble and broke up a pass at Houston. He returned his interception against SMU 31 yards for a score for his first career touchdown.

=== 2008 season ===
Sendejo was an honorable mention All C-USA pick by the coaches, second-team pick by the Houston Chronicle, while Phil Steele placed him on his first-team, All-conference unit. He led the Owls with 94 total tackles despite missing nearly three full games with a high ankle sprain. He also totaled 89 yards in returns, bringing back an interception 55 yards for a touchdown and returning a fumble 34 yards to set up a second score. That interception return was his second of his career for a score, with both coming against SMU. He was fifth in C-USA stats with 8.55 tackles per game (51st nationally) and 22nd in NCAA stats with 5.4 solo tackles per game. He opened the year by earning C-USA Defensive Player of the Week honors for his game vs. SMU. He had back-to-back 13-tackle efforts at Memphis and Vanderbilt, then was credited with a season-high 17 tackles at Texas, one shy of his career-high of 18 set in 2007 at Marshall. He saw his streak of double-figure tackle games end at three when he was credited for three stops against North Texas. In that game, he made his debut as the Owls' punt returner, fielding a pair for no gain, then returned his third for a gain of 21. He got injured early in the Tulsa game and did not record a tackle. He missed the Southern Miss game, breaking a streak of 24 consecutive games played (23 starts). He also missed the Tulane game, and then returned to action against UTEP and led the Owls with eight tackles. He closed out the regular season by recording his fifth double-figure tackle game of the year with 13 vs. Houston. It was his ninth career double-figure tackle game.

=== 2009 season ===
As a senior, Sendejo was named to Phil Steele's Midseason All C-USA Third-team. He was able to play in only 7 games, after his season was cut short by a high ankle injury that required surgery. He was tied for sixth in the nation with 6.4 unassisted tackles per game at the time of his injury. He moved into a tie for second on the Owls' career tackle chart with nine stops at ECU, and jumped four spots on the tackling chart with 17 tackles vs. Navy, matching the second highest game total of his career. It was his 11th career double-figure tackle game. He was the NCAA career active leader with 216 career solo tackles (Sean Weatherspoon of Missouri was second with 199) before he got hurt. He ranked fourth in C-USA and 14th in the nation with a 14.3 yard average per punt return before his injury. He returned two punts for 65 yards vs. Vanderbilt, including a career best 47 yarder, the longest by an Owl since 1998 when LaDouphyous McCalla returned one 51 yards against Colorado State. He missed part of the Texas Tech game after injuring a wrist, but returned to finish the game. He recorded his 10th career double-digit tackle total in the opener at UAB with 15 stops. He finished his college career with 318 tackles (second in school history), 9 interceptions (seventh in school history), 2 sacks and 7 forced fumbles.

== Professional career ==
Pre-draft measurables
Height	Weight	Arm length	Hand span	40-yard dash	10-yard split	20-yard split	20-yard shuttle	Three-cone drill	Vertical jump	Broad jump	Bench press
6 ft 1 1/8 in (1.86 m)	208 lb (94 kg)	33 1/4 in (0.84 m)	9 1/2 in (0.24 m)	4.65 s	1.56 s	2.62 s	4.04 s	6.87 s	34.0 in (0.86 m)	10 ft 1 in (3.07 m)	19 reps
All values from Rice's Pro Day

Sendejo went undrafted in the 2010 NFL draft, and did not receive any offers to sign as an undrafted free agent. He attended rookie minicamp with the Tampa Bay Buccaneers, but did not receive a contract offer upon completion. Sendejo also attended a tryout with the New Orleans Saints, but did not receive any further interest from the team.

=== Sacramento Mountain Lions ===
On August 20, 2010, it was reported that Sendejo signed a contract with the Sacramento Mountain Lions of the United Football League (UFL). He started at safety for the Mountain Lions and finished the 2010 UFL season with 48 combined tackles (31 solo), seven pass breakups, and two interceptions in eight games and eight starts. He tied for the second most tackles in the league during the 2010 season and led the Mountain Lions in total tackles and interceptions.

=== Dallas Cowboys ===
==== 2010 ====
On November 24, 2010, the Dallas Cowboys signed Sendejo to a two-year, $725,000 contract to join their practice squad as an unrestricted free agent. On November 29, 2010, Sendejo was promoted to the active roster. On December 12, 2010, Sendejo made his NFL debut during a 30–27 loss against the Philadelphia Eagles. On December 19, 2010, Sendejo recorded his first career tackle on kick returner Brandon Banks during a 33–30 victory against the Washington Redskins. Sendejo and teammate Sam Hurd tackled Banks on a 22-yard kick return in the second quarter. He finished his rookie season with one tackle in two games.

Throughout training camp, Sendejo competed for a roster spot as a backup safety against Collin Zych and Danny McCray. On September 3, 2011, the Dallas Cowboys waived Sendejo as part of their final roster cuts.

=== New York Jets ===
On September 4, 2011, the New York Jets claimed Sendejo off of waivers and signed him to their active roster. His signing was marred in minor controversy as it was speculated the New York Jets signed him in a bid to gain intelligence of the Dallas Cowboys' defense. At the time, the New York Jets' head coach was Rex Ryan and his twin brother, Rob Ryan, was the Dallas Cowboys' defensive coordinator. Cowboys' quarterback Tony Romo stated during a press conference that Rob Ryan had made minor adjustments to the defense to prevent any information to possibly be passed on to the Jets. On September 13, 2011, the New York Jets waived Sendejo. The following day, Sendejo was signed to the Jets' practice squad after clearing waivers. On September 27, 2011, the Jets released Sendejo from their practice squad. After his release, Sendejo verified that the Jets coaching staff had in fact asked him about the Dallas Cowboys' defense, but mainly asked him to verify some tendencies.

=== Minnesota Vikings ===
==== 2011 ====
On November 29, 2011, the Minnesota Vikings signed Sendejo to a two-year, $900,000 contract. On December 11, 2011, Sendejo made his Minnesota Vikings' debut and recorded one solo tackle during their 34–28 loss at the Detroit Lions in Week 14. He was inactive as a healthy scratch the following week before appearing in the last two regular season games. He finished the 2011 season with three combined tackles (two solo) in three games and zero starts.

==== 2012 ====
Sendejo entered training camp and competed for a roster spot as a backup safety against Jamarca Sanford, Robert Blanton, and Eric Frampton. Head coach Leslie Frazier named Sendejo the third strong safety on the depth chart to begin the regular season, behind rookie Harrison Smith and Jamarca Sanford.

He was inactive for the Minnesota Vikings' season-opening 26–23 victory against the Jacksonville Jaguars after sustaining an ankle injury during the preseason. He missed another two games (Weeks 4–5) after aggravating his ankle injury. In Week 7, he made a solo tackle on Patrick Peterson during a five-yard punt return in the third quarter of a 21–14 win against the Arizona Cardinals. Sendejo played primarily on special teams in 2012 and finished the season with six solo tackles in 13 games and zero starts. The Minnesota Vikings finished second in the NFC North with a 10–6 record and earned a wildcard berth. On January 5, 2013, Sendejo appeared in his first career playoff game and recorded a season-high two combined tackles during a 24–10 loss at the Green Bay Packers in the NFC Wildcard Game.

==== 2013 ====
Sendejo became an exclusive rights free agent in 2013 and was required to re-sign with the Vikings if he was offered a contract. On March 15, 2013, the Minnesota Vikings signed Sendejo to a one-year, $630,000 contract for the required veteran league minimum.

Throughout training camp, Sendejo competed to be the starting strong safety against Mistral Raymond, Robert Blanton, Jamarca Sanford, Brandan Bishop, and Darius Eubanks. Head coach Leslie Frazier officially named Sendejo a backup strong safety, behind Jamarca Sanford and Mistral Raymond, to start the regular season. On September 19, 2013, the Minnesota Vikings signed Sendejo to a two-year, $2 million contract extension that includes $400,000 guaranteed and a signing bonus $200,000.

On September 29, 2013, Sendejo earned his first career start in place of Jamarca Sanford, who was inactive due to a hamstring injury. Sendejo recorded four solo tackles in a 34–27 victory against the Pittsburgh Steelers in London during their Week 4 contest. In Week 7, Sendejo made his first start at free safety and recorded six combined tackles during a 23–7 loss at the New York Giants. He started nine consecutive games at free safety (Weeks 7–15) after Harrison Smith was placed on injured reserve/designation to return due to a turf toe injury. On November 7, 2013, he collected a career-high 16 combined tackles (eight solo) in the Vikings' 34–27 victory against the Washington Redskins in Week 10. The following week, Sendejo had 11 combined tackles (six solo) during a 41–20 loss at the Seattle Seahawks in Week 11. On December 8, 2013, Sendejo recorded three combined tackles, two pass deflections, and made his first career interception in a 29–26 loss to the Baltimore Ravens. He intercepted a pass by quarterback Joe Flacco that was originally intended for tight end Ed Dickson in the fourth quarter. He finished 2013 with a career-high 84 combined tackles (52 solo), two pass deflections, and an interception in 16 games and ten starts. On December 30, 2013, the Minnesota Vikings fired head coach Leslie Frazier after they finished fourth in the NFC North with a 5–10–1 record.

==== 2014 ====
On August 4, 2014, the Minnesota Vikings activated Sendejo off of their physically unable to perform list after he fully recovered from back surgery he underwent in April. He competed against Robert Blanton and Antone Exum to be the starting strong safety. Head coach Mike Zimmer named Sendejo the backup free safety, behind Harrison Smith, to start the 2014 regular season. In Week 15, he started in place of Blanton, who was unable to play due to a leg injury. Sendejo recorded six combined tackles, in Blanton's absence, as the Vikings lost 16–14 at the Detroit Lions. Defensive coordinator George Edwards chose to keep Sendejo as the starting strong safety for the remaining two games (Weeks 16–17), although Blanton had recovered from his leg injury. On December 28, 2014, Sendejo collected a season-high nine combined tackles during a 13–9 win against the Chicago Bears in Week 17. He finished the season with 27 combined tackles (20 solo) and a forced fumble in 16 games and three starts.

==== 2015 ====
During training camp, Sendejo competed against Robert Blanton, Antone Exum, and Anthony Harris to retain the job as the starting strong safety. Head coach Mike Zimmer named Sendejo the starting strong safety to start the regular season, opposite free safety Harrison Smith.

He started in the Minnesota Vikings' season-opener at the San Francisco 49ers and made three solo tackles and blocked a field goal in their 20–3 loss. On the 49ers' opening drive, Sendejo blocked a 28-yard field goal attempt by kicker Phil Dawson and it was recovered by teammate Marcus Sherels at the Vikings' 44-yard line. He was sidelined for the Vikings' Week 4 loss at the Denver Broncos due to a knee injury. On November 8, 2015, Sendejo collected seven combined tackles, a pass deflection, and was credited with half a sack to mark the first of his career during a 21–18 overtime victory against the St. Louis Rams in Week 9. He sacked quarterback Nick Foles for an eight-yard loss with teammate Linval Joseph in the third quarter. Sendejo aggravated his knee injury and was inactive for two more games (Weeks 13–14). In Week 16, he made three solo tackles, a pass deflection, and intercepted a pass by Eli Manning during a 49–17 win against the New York Giants. On January 3, 2016, Sendejo collected a season-high 14 combined tackles (nine solo) in the Vikings' 20–13 win against the Green Bay Packers in Week 17. He finished the 2015 season with 74 combined tackles (58 solo), three passes defensed, and one interception in 13 games and 13 starts. He ranked 78th among the 88 qualified safeties in 2015 from Pro Football Focus.

The Minnesota Vikings finished the 2015 season first in the NFC North with an 11–5 record and earned a playoff berth. On January 10, 2016, Sendejo started his first career playoff game and made three solo tackles and a pass deflection during the Vikings' 10–9 loss to the Seattle Seahawks in the NFC Wildcard Game.

==== 2016 ====
On March 5, 2016, the Minnesota Vikings signed Sendejo to a four-year, $16 million contract that includes $3.95 million guaranteed.

On September 18, 2016, Sendejo collected a season-high 11 combined tackles (nine solo) during a 17–14 win against the Green Bay Packers in Week 2. In Week 5, he made six combined tackles, a pass deflection, and an interception in the Vikings' 31–13 win against the Houston Texans. The following game, Sendejo deflected a pass and made an interception during a 21–10 loss at the Philadelphia Eagles in Week 7. He was inactive for the Vikings' Week 8 loss at the Chicago Bears after injuring his ankle the previous week. On December 31, 2016, the Minnesota Vikings placed Sendejo on injured reserve due to a knee injury he sustained in practice. Sendejo finished the 2016 season with 69 combined tackles (45 solo), four pass deflections, two fumble recoveries, two interceptions, and was credited with half a sack in 14 games and 14 starts. Sendejo earned an overall grade of 78.6 from Pro Football Focus in 2016.

==== 2017 ====
Sendejo entered training camp slated as the starting strong safety. Head coach Mike Zimmer officially named Sendejo and Harrison Smith the starting safety duo to begin the 2017 regular season. On September 24, 2017, Sendejo recorded five combined tackles, two pass deflections, and intercepted a pass attempt by quarterback Jameis Winston in the Vikings' 34–17 victory against the Tampa Bay Buccaneers. The following week, he collected a season-high 11 combined tackles (five solo) during a 14–7 loss to the Detroit Lions in Week 4. He was inactive during a Week 6 win against the Green Bay Packers due to a groin injury. In Week 7, Sendejo delivered a helmet-to-helmet hit while tackling wide receiver Mike Wallace which caused Wallace to exit the game a due to a concussion. The next day, Sendejo was suspended one game for violating the league's player safety rules. On December 10, 2017, Sendejo recorded nine combined tackles, deflected a pass, and made an interception off a pass by Cam Newton in a 31–24 loss at the Carolina Panthers. He completed the 2017 season with 80 combined tackles (54 solo), seven passes defensed, and two interceptions in 13 games and 13 starts. Pro Football Focus gave Sendejo an overall grade of 86.8, which ranked 11th among all qualified safeties in 2017.

The Minnesota Vikings finished atop of their division with a 13–3 record and earned a first round bye. On January 10, 2018, Sendejo collected four solo tackles, deflected two passes, and made an interception during Minnesota's to 29–24 comeback victory against the New Orleans Saints in the NFC Divisional Round. He intercepted a pass attempt thrown by quarterback Drew Brees in the first quarter that was originally intended for wide receiver Ted Ginn Jr. The following week, Sendejo collected four solo tackles as the Minnesota Vikings were routed 38–7 by the Philadelphia Eagles in the NFC Championship Game.

==== 2018 ====
In 2018, Sendejo started the first five games before suffering a groin injury in Week 5 against the Philadelphia Eagles. He was inactive the next six games before being placed on injured reserve on November 27, 2018. On March 11, 2019, the Vikings declined the option on Sendejo's contract, making him an unrestricted free agent.

=== Philadelphia Eagles ===
On March 18, 2019, the Philadelphia Eagles signed Sendejo to a one-year contract. In week 2 against the Atlanta Falcons, he recorded his second career sack on Matt Ryan in the 24–20 loss. In week 6 against the Minnesota Vikings, he recorded an interception off former teammate Kirk Cousins in the 38–20 loss. He was waived on November 5, 2019.

=== Minnesota Vikings (second stint) ===
On November 6, 2019, Sendejo was claimed off waivers by the Minnesota Vikings. In Sendejo's first game back with the Vikings, he recorded a team high 7 tackles and intercepted a pass thrown by Brandon Allen in the 27–23 comeback win over the Denver Broncos in week 11. In week 14 against the Detroit Lions, Sendejo intercepted a pass thrown by rookie quarterback David Blough late in the fourth quarter to seal a 20–7 Vikings win.

=== Cleveland Browns ===
On March 27, 2020, Sendejo signed a one-year contract with the Cleveland Browns. He was placed on the reserve/COVID-19 list by the team on December 29, and activated on January 7, 2021.

=== Indianapolis Colts ===
On September 14, 2021, Sendejo was signed by the Indianapolis Colts.

== NFL statistics ==
Year	Team	Games		Tackles					Interceptions						Fumbles		
Year	Team	GP	GS	Comb	Total	Ast	Sck	Sfty	PDef	Int	Yds	Avg	Lng	TDs	FF	FR	YDs
2010	DAL	2	0	1	0	1	0.0	--	0	--	--	0.0	--	--	0	0	0
2011	NYJ	0	0	0	0	0	0.0	--	0	--	--	0.0	--	--	0	0	0
2011	MIN	3	0	3	1	1	0.0	--	0	--	--	0.0	--	--	0	0	0
2012	MIN	13	0	6	6	0	0.0	--	0	--	--	0.0	--	--	0	0	0
2013	MIN	16	10	84	52	32	0.0	--	2	1	1	1.0	1	0	0	0	0
2014	MIN	16	3	27	20	7	0.0	--	0	--	--	0.0	--	--	1	0	0
2015	MIN	13	13	74	58	16	0.5	--	3	1	9	9.0	9	0	0	1	0
2016	MIN	14	14	69	45	24	0.5	--	4	2	18	9.0	16	0	0	2	0
2017	MIN	13	13	80	54	26	0.0	--	7	2	70	35.0	36	0	0	0	0
2018	MIN	5	5	27	21	6	0.0	--	1	--	--	0.0	--	--	0	0	0
2019	PHI	9	1	28	23	5	1.0	--	2	1	15	15.0	15	--	0	0	0
2019	MIN	6	2	17	13	4	0.0	--	2	2	21	10.5	15	--	0	0	0
2020	CLE	14	14	67	51	16	0.0	--	2	--	--	--	--	--	1	0	0
Career		124	75	483	345	138	2.0	0	23	9	134	16.3	36	0	2	3	0

== Personal life ==
Sendejo is of Mexican descent. He earned a degree in sports management from Rice.

On February 12, 2025, Sendejo married his girlfriend Annie Kadota in Houston, Texas. In June 2025, the couple announced that they were expecting their first child, a daughter due in December.

Sendejo has remained a committed weight lifter through his retirement from the NFL. He often makes appearances on Tanner Shuck’s fitness content. Shuck and Sendejo played football together at Rice University.
