= 1984 Green Bay Packers season =

NFL team season

- Head coach: Forrest Gregg
- Home stadium: Lambeau Field; Milwaukee County Stadium

Results
- Record: 8–8
- Division place: 2nd NFC Central
- Playoffs: Did not qualify

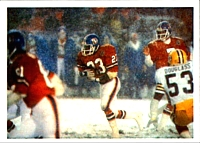
Monday Night Football: Packers played the Denver Broncos at Mile High Stadium on October 15, 1984

The 1984 Green Bay Packers season was their 66th season overall and their 64th in the National Football League. Under new head coach Forrest Gregg, Green Bay won the season opener at home, lost seven straight, then won seven of eight to again finish at 8–8, second in the NFC Central division.

== Offseason ==
=== Draft ===
1984 Green Bay Packers draft
Round	Pick	Player	Position	College	Notes
1	12	Alphonso Carreker	Defensive end	Florida State	
3	72	Donnie Humphrey	Defensive end	Auburn	
4	99	John Dorsey	Linebacker	Connecticut	
5	126	Tom Flynn	Safety	Pittsburgh	
6	153	Randy Wright	Quarterback	Wisconsin	
7	180	Daryll Jones	Safety	Georgia	
10	267	Gary Hoffman	Offensive tackle	Santa Clara	
11	294	Mark Cannon	Center	Texas–Arlington	
12	313	Lenny Taylor	Wide receiver	Tennessee	
12	321	Mark Emans	Linebacker	Bowling Green	
Made roster † Pro Football Hall of Fame * Made at least one Pro Bowl during career

=== Undrafted free agents ===
1984 undrafted free agents of note
Player	Position	College
Scott Chalene	Wide receiver	Arkansas
Curt Cole	Tight end	Texas Tech
Shelby Gamble	Running back	Boston College
Guy Goodwin	Wide Receiver	Morgan State
Drew Hardville	Defensive back	Arizona
Kevin Kreig	Guard	Eastern Michigan
Marvin Neal	Wide Receiver	Wisconsin
David Robb	Wide Receiver	Mankato State
Jim Viaene	Defensive end	Wisconsin–Superior
Tom Viaene	Defensive tackle	Wisconsin–Superior
Ken Walter	Guard	Texas Tech
Ed West	Tight end	Auburn

== Personnel ==
=== Staff ===
1984 Green Bay Packers staff
Front office: President – Robert J. Parins; Corporate assistant to the president – Bob Harlan; Director of player personnel – Dick Corrick; Head coaches: Head coach – Forrest Gregg; Offensive coaches: Offensive coordinator – Bob Schnelker; Offensive backs – George Sefcik; Receivers – Lew Carpenter; Offensive line – Jerry Wampfler	Defensive coaches: Defensive coordinator/defensive line – Dick Modzelewski; Linebackers – Herb Paterra; Linebackers – Chuck Priefer; Defensive backs – Ken Riley; Special teams coaches: Special teams – Chuck Priefer; Strength and conditioning: Strength and conditioning – Virgil Knight

=== Roster ===
1984 Green Bay Packers roster
Quarterbacks (QB): 19 Rich Campbell; 12 Lynn Dickey; Running backs (RB): 21 Ray Crouse; 31 Gerry Ellis; 25 Harlan Huckleby; 40 Eddie Lee Ivery; 35 Del Rodgers; Wide receivers (WR): 88 Ron Cassidy; 85 Phil Epps; 83 John Jefferson; 80 James Lofton; 84 Lenny Taylor; Tight ends (TE): 82 Paul Coffman; 49 Ed West	Offensive linemen (OL): 58 Mark Cannon C; 61 Dave Drechsler G; 65 Ron Hallstrom G; 78 Gary Hoffman T; 74 Tim Huffman G/T; 68 Greg Koch T; 60 Blake Moore C; 67 Karl Swanke T; 70 Keith Uecker G; Defensive linemen (DL): 93 Robert Brown DE; 76 Alphonso Carreker DE; 98 Tony DeLuca DE; 79 Donnie Humphrey DE; 63 Terry Jones NT; 94 Charles Martin DE; 77 Bill Neill NT	Linebackers (LB): 59 John Anderson OLB; 52 George Cumby ILB; 99 John Dorsey ILB; 53 Mike Douglass OLB; 56 Cliff Lewis OLB; 51 Guy Prather OLB; 55 Randy Scott ILB; 50 Rich Wingo ILB; Defensive backs (DB): 41 Tom Flynn FS; 24 Johnnie Gray SS; 27 Gary Hayes CB; 38 Estus Hood CB; 43 Daryll Jones SS; 22 Mark Lee CB; 26 Tim Lewis CB; 28 Mike McLeod FS; 37 Mark Murphy FS; Special teams (ST): 10 Al Del Greco K; 13 Bucky Scribner P	Reserve: 33 Jessie Clark RB (IR); 69 Leotis Harris G (IR); 90 Ezra Johnson DE (IR); 81 Gary Lewis TE (IR); 29 Mike McCoy CB (IR); 54 Larry McCarren C (IR); -- Ken Walter G (IR); 16 Randy Wright QB (IR); Rookies in italics 49 active

== Preseason ==
Week	Date	Opponent	Result	Record	Venue	Recap
1	August 5	at Dallas Cowboys	L 17–31	0–1	Texas Stadium	Recap
2	August 12	Chicago Bears	W 17–10	1–1	Lambeau Field	Recap
3	August 19	at Los Angeles Rams	L 24–27	1-2	Anaheim Stadium	Recap
4	August 26	Indianapolis Colts	W 34–17	2–2	Lambeau Field	Recap

== Regular season ==
=== Schedule ===
Week	Date	Opponent	Result	Record	Venue	Attendance	Recap
1	September 2	St. Louis Cardinals	**W** 24–23	1–0	Lambeau Field	53,738	Recap
2	September 9	at Los Angeles Raiders	**L** 7–28	1–1	Los Angeles Memorial Coliseum	46,269	Recap
3	September 16	**Chicago Bears**	**L** 7–9	1–2	Lambeau Field	55,942	Recap
4	September 23	at Dallas Cowboys	**L** 6–20	1–3	Texas Stadium	64,222	Recap
5	September 30	at **Tampa Bay Buccaneers**	**L** 27–30 (OT)	1–4	Tampa Stadium	47,487	Recap
6	October 7	San Diego Chargers	**L** 28–34	1–5	Lambeau Field	54,045	Recap
7	October 15	at Denver Broncos	**L** 14–17	1–6	Mile High Stadium	62,546	Recap
8	October 21	Seattle Seahawks	**L** 24–30	1–7	Milwaukee County Stadium	52,286	Recap
9	October 28	**Detroit Lions**	**W** 41–9	2–7	Lambeau Field	54,289	Recap
10	November 4	at New Orleans Saints	**W** 23–13	3–7	Louisiana Superdome	57,426	Recap
11	November 11	**Minnesota Vikings**	**W** 45–17	4–7	Milwaukee County Stadium	52,931	Recap
12	November 18	Los Angeles Rams	**W** 31–6	5–7	Milwaukee County Stadium	52,031	Recap
13	November 22	at **Detroit Lions**	**L** 28–31	5–8	Pontiac Silverdome	63,698	Recap
14	December 2	**Tampa Bay Buccaneers**	**W** 27–14	6–8	Lambeau Field	46,800	Recap
15	December 9	at **Chicago Bears**	**W** 20–14	7–8	Soldier Field	59,374	Recap
16	December 16	at **Minnesota Vikings**	**W** 38–14	8–8	Hubert H. Humphrey Metrodome	51,197	Recap

Note: Intra-division opponents are in bold text.

=== Game summaries ===
==== Week 1 ====
Team	1	2	3	4	Total
Cardinals	7	0	6	10	23
• Packers	0	14	10	0	24

- Date: September 2
- Location: Lambeau Field, Green Bay, Wisconsin
- Game start: 1:00 p.m. EST
- Game attendance: 53,738
- Game weather: 63 °F (17 °C); wind 9 mph (14 km/h)
- Referee: Ben Dreith
- TV announcers (CBS): Dick Stockton and Hank Stram

Scoring summary
Q1	STL	Tilley 14-yard pass from Lomax (O'Donoghue kick)	STL 7–0
Q2	GB	Clark 1-yard run (Garcia kick)	Tie 7–7
Q2	GB	Coffman 4-yard pass from Dickey (Garcia kick)	GB 14–7
Q3	GB	Dickey 1-yard run (Garcia kick)	GB 21–7
Q3	STL	Anderson 3-yard run (kick failed)	GB 21–13
Q3	GB	Garcia 38-yard field goal	GB 24–13
Q4	STL	Green 18-yard pass from Lomax (O'Donoghue kick)	GB 24–20
Q4	STL	O'Donoghue 48-yard field goal	GB 24–23

- James Lofton 7 Rec, 134 Yds

==== Week 7 at Broncos ====
Green Bay Packers (1–5) at Denver Broncos (5–1)

Quarter	1	2	3	4	Total
Packers	0	0	7	7	**14**
Broncos	14	3	0	0	**17**

at Mile High Stadium • Denver, Colorado

- Date: October 15
- Game time: 9:00 p.m. EDT
- Game weather: Snow • 32 °F (0 °C) • Wind 4 mph (6.4 km/h)
- Game attendance: 62,546
- Referee: Gordon McCarter
- TV announcers (ABC): Frank Gifford, Don Meredith, and O. J. Simpson
- Pro-Football-Reference.com

Game information

Packers

- Lynn Dickey
  27/37, 371 Yds, TD, INT
- Jessie Clark
  11 Rush, 37 Yds
- James Lofton
  11 Rec, 206 Yds, TD

Broncos

- John Elway
  11/20, 101 Yds, INT
- Sammy Winder
  29 Rush, 86 Yds
- Steve Watson
  4 Rec, 42 Yds

Scoring summary

Quarter	Time	Drive			Team	Scoring information	Score	
Quarter	Time	Plays	Yards	TOP	Team	Scoring information	GB	DEN
1					Broncos	Fumble recovery returned 22 yards for touchdown by Foley, Karlis kick good	0	7
1					Broncos	Fumble recovery returned 27 yards for touchdown by Wright, Karlis kick good	0	14
2					Broncos	30-yard field goal by Karlis	0	17
3					Packers	Ellis 5-yard touchdown run, Garcia kick good	7	17
4					Packers	Lofton 54-yard touchdown reception from Dickey, Garcia kick good	14	17
"TOP" = time of possession. For other American football terms, see Glossary of American football.							14	17

==== Week 9 ====
Team	1	2	3	4	Total
Lions	3	6	0	0	9
• Packers	14	14	10	3	41

- Date: October 28
- Location: Lambeau Field
- Game attendance: 54,289
- Referee: Ben Dreith

Scoring summary
Q1	10:22	GB	Clark 1 yard run (Del Greco kick)	GB 7–0
Q1	4:14	GB	Coffman 20 yard pass from Dickey (Del Greco kick)	GB 14–0
Q1	0:10	DET	Murray 46 yard field goal	GB 14–3
Q2	7:27	DET	Murray 37 yard field goal	GB 14–6
Q2	4:14	GB	Coffman 3 yard pass from Dickey (Del Greco kick)	GB 21–6
Q2	1:36	DET	Murray 41 yard field goal	GB 17–9
Q2	0:05	GB	Moore 3 yard pass from Dickey (Del Greco kick)	GB 28–9
Q3	11:13	GB	Lofton 6 yard pass from Dickey (Del Greco kick)	GB 35–9
Q3	3:24	GB	Del Greco 45 yard field goal	GB 38–9
Q4	7:24	GB	Del Greco 34 yard field goal	GB 41–9

- Eddie Lee Ivery 9 Rush, 116 Yds

=== Standings ===
NFC Central
	W	L	T	PCT	DIV	CONF	PF	PA	STK
Chicago Bears^{(3)}	10	6	0	.625	7–1	8–4	325	248	W1
Green Bay Packers	8	8	0	.500	5–3	8–4	390	309	W3
Tampa Bay Buccaneers	6	10	0	.375	3–5	5–9	335	380	W2
Detroit Lions	4	11	1	.281	3–5	4–7–1	283	408	L3
Minnesota Vikings	3	13	0	.188	2–6	3–9	276	484	L6

== Statistics ==
=== Passing ===
Player	Attempts	Completion	Percentage	Yards	Avg	Long	TD	Int	Sacks	Rating
Lynn Dickey	401	237	59.1	3195	7.97	79t	25	19	7 32	85.6
Randy Wright	62	27	43.5	310	5.00	56	2	6	4	30.4
Rich Campbell	38	16	42.1	218	5.74	43t	3	5	5	47.8
TOTALS	506	281	55.5	3740	7.39	79t	30	30	42	74.2

=== Receiving ===
Player	Receptions	Yards	Average	TD	Long
James Lofton	62	1361	22.0	7	79t
Paul Coffman	43	562	13.1	9	44t
Gerry Ellis	36	312	8.7	2	22
Jessie Clark	29	234	8.1	2	20
Phil Epps	26	435	16.7	3	56
John Jefferson	26	339	13.0	0	33
Eddie Lee Ivery	19	141	7.4	1	18
Ray Crouse	9	93	10.3	1	25
Harlan Huckleby	8	65	8.1	0	13
Ed West	6	54	9.0	4	29t
Del Rodgers	5	56	11.2	0	22
TOTALS	281	3740	13.3	30	79t

=== Rushing ===
Player	Attempts	Yards	avg	TD	Long
Gerry Ellis	123	581	4.7	4	50
Eddie Lee Ivery	99	552	5.6	6	49
Jessie Clark	87	375	4.3	4	43t
Ray Crouse	53	169	3.2	0	14
Harlan Huckleby	35	145	4.1	0	23
Del Rodgers	25	94	3.8	0	15
Lynn Dickey	18	6	0.3	3	9
TOTALS	461	2019	4.4	18	50

=== Defensive ===
Player	Sacks	INT'S	Yards	Average	TD	Long
John Anderson	3.5	3	24	8.0	0	22
Robert Brown	5.0	1	5	5.0	1	5t
Alphonso Carreker	3.0	0	0	0.0	0	0
George Cumby	2.5	1	7	7.0	0	7
Mike Douglass	9.0	0	0	0.0	0	0
Tom Flynn	0.0	9	106	11.8	0	31
Estus Hood	0.0	1	8	8.0	0	8
Donnie Humphrey	1.0	0	0	0.0	0	0
Ezra Johnson	7.0	0	0	0.0	0	0
Terry Jones	4.0	0	0	0.0	0	0
Mark Lee	0.0	3	33	11.0	0	14
Tim Lewis	0.0	7	151	21.6	1	99t
Charles Martin	3.0	0	0	0.0	0	0
Mark Murphy	2.0	1	4	4.0	0	8
Randy Scott	3.0	0	0	0.0	0	0
TOTALS	44.0	0.0	27	338	2	99t

(some players making minor contributions have been left off the list, but their contributions are reflected in the total category)

== Awards and records ==
- Tom Flynn, NFC Leader, Interceptions (9)
- Tim Lewis sets franchise record with a 99-yard INT return (week 12)

=== Hall of Famers ===
These players were inducted to the Green Bay Packers Hall of Fame in February 1984

John Brockington, RB, 1971–77

Dan Currie, LB, 1958–64

Ed Jankowski, B, 1937–41

Carl Mulleneaux, E, 1938–41, 1945–46
