= Corey Clark (American football) =

American football player (born 1984)

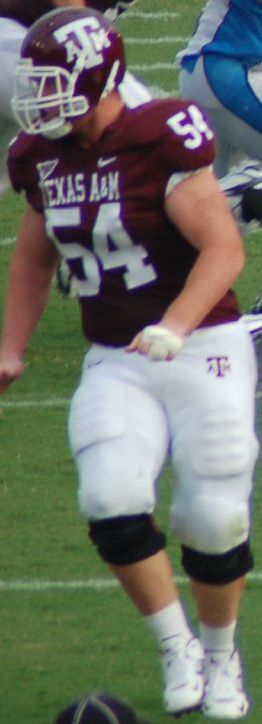
- Clark at Texas A&M in 2006

No. 75
- Position: Offensive tackle

Personal information
- Born: June 21, 1984 (age 42); Spring Branch, Texas, U.S.
- Listed height: 6 ft 5 in (1.96 m)
- Listed weight: 305 lb (138 kg)

Career information
- High school: Smithson Valley (Spring Branch)
- College: Texas A&M
- NFL draft: 2008: 7th round, 234th overall pick

Career history
- San Diego Chargers (2008–2009)

Career NFL statistics
- Games played: 2
- Stats at Pro Football Reference

Corey Stanley Clark (born June 21, 1984) is an American former professional football player who was an offensive tackle for the San Diego Chargers of the National Football League (NFL). He played college football for the Texas A&M Aggies and was selected by the Chargers in the seventh round of the 2008 NFL draft.

== Early life ==
Clark attended Smithson Valley High School in Spring Branch, Texas.

== Professional career ==
During the Chargers' 2008 minicamps, he practiced as a right tackle. He signed a four-year contract with the team on June 30, 2008. According to the Chargers, he will "most likely battle for a reserve role along the offensive line".

Clark remained on the active roster for the first nine games of the 2008 season, but was cut on November 14 to make room for safety Tra Battle. He was then re-signed to the team's practice squad on November 18. The following day, he was re-signed to the active roster when wide receiver Buster Davis was placed on injured reserve. He was not active for any of the games during the 2008 season.

Clark was waived on December 1, 2009 and was re-signed to the practice squad on December 5.

After his contract expired at season's end, Clark signed a future contract with the Chargers on January 22, 2010. However, on August 9, 2010, he retired from football to focus more on his family.
