= Smithson Valley High School =

Public high school in Texas, United States

Location
- 14001 Highway 46 West; Spring Branch, Comal County, Texas 78070-7299; United States; 29.80278°N 98.35954°W

Information
- School type: Public high school
- Established: 1976
- School district: Comal Independent School District
- NCES District ID: 4814730
- Superintendent: John E. Chapman III
- NCES School ID: 481473000974
- Principal: Stacia Snyder
- Staff: 141.13 (on an FTE basis)
- Grades: 9–12
- Age range: 14-18
- Enrollment: 2,118 (2025-2026)
  - Grade 9: 532
  - Grade 10: 537
  - Grade 11: 474
  - Grade 12: 524
- Student to teacher ratio: 14.58
- Hours in school day: 7 hours 35 minutes
- Colors: Red, White & Navy
- Athletics conference: UIL Class 5A
- Sports: Football, Basketball, Golf, Soccer, Lacrosse, Baseball, Tennis, Water Polo, Volleyball, Softball, Wrestling, Cross Country, Swimming, Track and Field,
- Mascot: Rangers/Lady Rangers
- Nickname: SV Rangers
- Newspaper: Valley Ventana
- Feeder schools: Smithson Valley Middle School, Spring Branch Middle School, Arlon R. Seay Elementary School, Bill Brown Elementary School, Johnson Ranch Elementary School, Rahe Bulverde Elementary School
- Website: svhs.comalisd.org

Smithson Valley High School (commonly referred to as SVHS) is a public high school located in unincorporated Comal County, Texas, and is classified as a 5A school by the UIL. It is part of the Comal Independent School District and is one of the five out of seven traditional high schools within the district. As of the 2025–2026 school year, enrollment is 2,118. Smithson Valley's student enrollment reached as high as 2,584 in the 2021–22 school year before some students were sent off to the brand-new and recently opened Pieper High School after the 2021–22 school year which was built to deal with the growing population of the school's attendance zone and to provide relief to Smithson Valley's attendance roster.

Smithson Valley High School is zoned for students who live primarily in the southwestern of Comal County area, northern Bexar County area, and portions of Kendall County including the majority of Bulverde, Spring Branch, Smithson Valley, portions of Boerne, and portions of Canyon Lake. In 2015, the school was rated "Met Standard" by the Texas Education Agency.

== History ==
Smithson Valley High School was established in 1976 and was named after Benjamin Smithson, who was one of the first Texas Rangers, and an early settler in the area.

In 2007, some students were sent to the new Canyon Lake High School. Before the split, Smithson Valley's student enrollment reached as high as 2,500 students.

The enrollment for the 2021–22 school year was 2,584. As of that time, 15% of students were economically disadvantaged. 56.1% of students enrolled as of the 2021–22 school year were Caucasian, 35.2% Hispanic, 2.7% African American, and 6% other. The ratio of male to female students was 1:1 as of 2023. There was a student-to-teacher ratio of sixteen to one compared to the Texas average of twelve to one. 98% of enrolled students graduate in 2023.

After Pieper High School opened, enrollment at Smithson Valley was reduced.

== Athletics ==
The Smithson Valley Rangers compete in a variety of sports. The school is part of District 12-5A. The football team has reached the UIL state championship game multiple times, including runner-up finishes in 2001 (5A Division II), 2002 (5A Division II), 2004 (5A Division II), and 2005 (5A Division I), and won back-to-back Class 5A Division I state championships in 2024 and 2025 under head coach Larry Hill, who has led the program since 1993. Smithson Valley also offers club lacrosse, band, dance team, cheerleading, NJROTC, FFA, National Forensic League, and foreign language clubs along with several interest clubs.

=== State Titles ===
- Academic Decathlon
  - 1991 (Small Schools Division)
- Girls Track & Field
  - 2023 (5A)
- Boys Golf
  - 2024 (5A)
- Football
  - 2024 (5A Division I)
  - 2025 (5A Division I)
- Girls Cross Country
  - 2024 (5A)
- Girls Soccer
  - 2026 (5A Division I)
- Softball
  - 2001 (4A)
  - 2009 (5A)
  - 2012 (4A)

== Notable alumni ==
- Eryk Anders, Cleveland Browns practice squad, professional Mixed Martial Artist, currently in the UFC's Middleweight Division
- Corey Clark, NFL, San Diego Chargers
- Logan Cunningham, 2016 Olympic pole vaulter
- Jack Gibbens, current football linebacker for the New England Patriots
- Jason LaRue, former MLB catcher, Cincinnati Reds (1999–2006), Kansas City Royals (2007) and St. Louis Cardinals (2008–2010)
- Trevon Moehrig, defensive back at TCU, Jim Thorpe Award winner (2020), defensive back with the Las Vegas Raiders
- Trey Moore, linebacker for the Miami Dolphins
- Joe Pawelek, former football linebacker for the Seattle Seahawks (2010)
- Zac Reininger, former pitcher for the Detroit Tigers (2017–2019)
- Andrew Sendejo, former NFL player, safety
- Levi Williams, former college football quarterback for the Wyoming Cowboys and Utah State Aggies
