= Jack Gibbens =

American football player (born 1998)

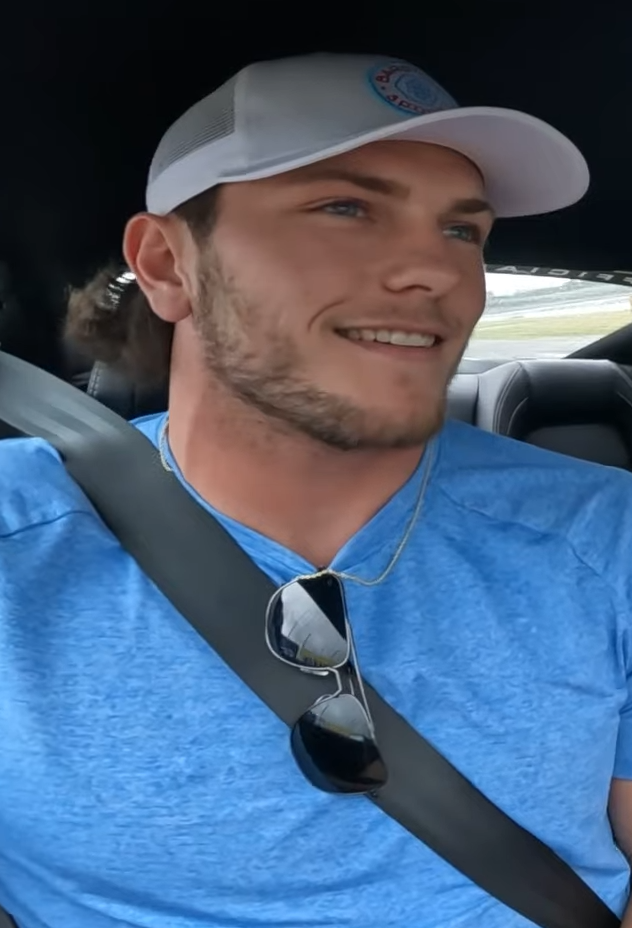
- Gibbens in 2023

No. 50 – Arizona Cardinals
- Position: Inside linebacker
- Roster status: Active

Personal information
- Born: November 24, 1998 (age 27); Bulverde, Texas, U.S.
- Listed height: 6 ft 3 in (1.91 m)
- Listed weight: 242 lb (110 kg)

Career information
- High school: Smithson Valley (Spring Branch, Texas)
- College: Abilene Christian (2017–2020); Minnesota (2021)
- NFL draft: 2022: undrafted

Career history
- Tennessee Titans (2022–2024); New England Patriots (2025); Arizona Cardinals (2026–present)

Career NFL statistics as of Week 5, 2026
- Total tackles: 283
- Sacks: 3
- Interceptions: 1
- Pass deflections: 9
- Forced fumbles: 1
- Fumble recoveries: 1
- Stats at Pro Football Reference

Jack Gibbens (born November 24, 1998) is an American professional football inside linebacker for the Arizona Cardinals of the National Football League (NFL). He played college football for the Abilene Christian Wildcats and Minnesota Golden Gophers, and was signed by the Tennessee Titans as an undrafted free agent in 2022.

== Early life ==
Gibbens was born on November 24, 1998, in Bulverde, Texas. He attended Smithson Valley High School and graduated in 2017, before joining Abilene Christian University where he played football from 2017–2020.

As a freshman at Abilene Christian, Gibbens appeared in ten games as a linebacker and posted 27 tackles and an interception. He played in all 11 matches the following year and totaled 78 tackles, placing top-50 in the FCS in tackles-per-game. In 2019, as a junior, Gibbens recorded 104 tackles, 2.5 sacks and two interceptions. As a senior in 2020, he recorded 49 tackles while only playing in six games.

Gibbens transferred to the University of Minnesota for his final year of eligibility. As a fifth-year senior in 2021, he recorded a team-leading 92 tackles, broke up three passes and forced a single fumble while starting all 13 games.

== Professional career ==
Pre-draft measurables
| Height | Weight | Arm length | Hand span | Wingspan | 40-yard dash | 10-yard split | 20-yard split | 20-yard shuttle | Three-cone drill | Vertical jump | Broad jump | Bench press |
|---|---|---|---|---|---|---|---|---|---|---|---|---|
| 6 ft 3 1/4 in (1.91 m) | 242 lb (110 kg) | 32 7/8 in (0.84 m) | 9 3/8 in (0.24 m) | 6 ft 6 1/4 in (1.99 m) | 4.82 s | 1.61 s | 2.76 s | 4.20 s | 7.02 s | 34.0 in (0.86 m) | 9 ft 9 in (2.97 m) | 14 reps |
All values from Pro Day

=== Tennessee Titans ===
After going unselected in the 2022 NFL draft, Gibbens was signed by the Tennessee Titans as an undrafted free agent. Although a fan favorite during the preseason, "Dr. Gibby," as he was nicknamed, was released at the final roster cuts and not initially re-signed to the practice squad. While a free agent in early September, Gibbens received a tryout from the Atlanta Falcons. He was eventually signed to the Titans practice squad on September 12. Gibbens was promoted to the active roster on December 10, and made his NFL debut in their game against the Jacksonville Jaguars one day later, appearing on 25 snaps. In week sixteen against the Houston Texas, he recorded eight total tackles, one pass deflection and his first career interception in the loss. The following week, against the Dallas Cowboys, Gibbens made his first career start and appeared on all 80 defensive snaps, recording 10 tackles. He finished the season having appeared in five games and recorded 28 tackles, an interception and one pass deflection.

Gibbens made the Titans' final roster in 2023. He played in 14 games with 13 starts, finishing second on the team with 95 tackles.

On March 13, 2024, the Titans placed an exclusive rights tender on Gibbens, which he signed the next day. He made 10 appearances (5 starts) for Tennessee in 2024, logging 1/2 a sack and 44 combined tackles. On November 18, 2024, it was announced that Gibbens would miss the remainder of the season after undergoing surgery to repair an ankle injury he suffered in Week 11.

=== New England Patriots ===
On March 19, 2025, Gibbens signed with the New England Patriots. In the regular season, he recorded one sack, 81 total tackles, four passes defended, one forced fumble, and one fumble recovery. Gibbens logged four total tackles in Super Bowl LX, a 29–13 loss to the Seattle Seahawks.

=== Arizona Cardinals ===
On March 16, 2026, Gibbens signed a two-year, $7.5 million contract with the Arizona Cardinals.

== NFL career statistics ==
Legend
| **Bold** | Career high |

=== Regular season ===
| Year | Team | Games | | Tackles | | | | | Interceptions | | | | | | Fumbles | | | | |
| Year | Team | GP | GS | Cmb | Solo | Ast | Sck | TFL | Int | Yds | Avg | Lng | TD | PD | FF | Fmb | FR | Yds | TD |
|---|---|---|---|---|---|---|---|---|---|---|---|---|---|---|---|---|---|---|---|
| 2022 | TEN | 5 | 2 | 28 | 16 | 12 | 0.0 | 0 | **1** | **7** | **7.0** | **7** | 0 | 1 | 0 | 0 | 0 | 0 | 0 |
| 2023 | TEN | 14 | 13 | **95** | **55** | **40** | **1.0** | 3 | 0 | 0 | 0.0 | 0 | 0 | 3 | 0 | 0 | 0 | 0 | 0 |
| 2024 | TEN | 10 | 5 | 44 | 22 | 22 | 0.5 | 2 | 0 | 0 | 0.0 | 0 | 0 | 0 | 0 | 0 | 0 | 0 | 0 |
| 2025 | NE | 17 | 8 | 81 | 43 | 38 | **1.0** | **8** | 0 | 0 | 0.0 | 0 | 0 | **4** | **1** | 0 | **1** | 0 | 0 |
| 2026 | ARI | 5 | 4 | 35 | 13 | 22 | 0.5 | 1 | 0 | 0 | 0.0 | 0 | 0 | 1 | 0 | 0 | 0 | 0 | 0 |
| Career | | 51 | 32 | 283 | 149 | 134 | 3.0 | 14 | 1 | 7 | 7.0 | 7 | 0 | 9 | 1 | 0 | 1 | 0 | 0 |

=== Postseason ===
| Year | Team | Games | | Tackles | | | | | Interceptions | | | | | | Fumbles | | | | |
| Year | Team | GP | GS | Cmb | Solo | Ast | Sck | TFL | Int | Yds | Avg | Lng | TD | PD | FF | Fmb | FR | Yds | TD |
|---|---|---|---|---|---|---|---|---|---|---|---|---|---|---|---|---|---|---|---|
| 2025 | NE | 4 | 2 | 19 | 7 | 12 | 0.0 | 0 | 0 | 0 | 0.0 | 0 | 0 | 0 | 0 | 0 | 0 | 0 | 0 |
| Career | | 4 | 2 | 19 | 7 | 12 | 0.0 | 0 | 0 | 0 | 0.0 | 0 | 0 | 0 | 0 | 0 | 0 | 0 | 0 |
