= McDuffie County School District =

School district in Georgia (U.S. state)

Address
- 716 North Lee Street Thomson, Georgia, 30824-1831; United States
- Coordinates: 33.474770°N 82.507610°W

District information
- Grades: Pre-school - 12
- Superintendent: Dr. Mychelle Rhodes
- Accreditations: Southern Association of Colleges and Schools; Georgia Accrediting Commission

Students and staff
- Enrollment: 4,312
- Faculty: 262

Other information
- Telephone: (706) 986-4000
- Fax: (706) 986-4001
- Website: www.mcduffie.k12.ga.us

The McDuffie County School District is a public school district in McDuffie County, Georgia, United States, based in Thomson. It serves the communities of Dearing and Thomson.

== Schools ==
The McDuffie County School District has four elementary schools, one middle schools, and one high school.

=== Elementary schools ===
- Dearing Elementary School
- Maxwell Elementary School
- Norris Elementary School
- Thomson Elementary School

=== Middle schools ===
- Thomson-McDuffie Middle School

=== High school ===
- Thomson High School
