= James Harris (linebacker) =

American football player (born 1982)

No. 44
- Positions: Linebacker, fullback

Personal information
- Born: June 2, 1982 (age 44); Albany, Georgia, U.S.
- Listed height: 6 ft 1 in (1.85 m)
- Listed weight: 260 lb (118 kg)

Career information
- High school: Thomson (Thomson, Georgia)
- College: Albany State
- NFL draft: 2006: undrafted

Career history
- South Georgia Wildcats (2006–2008); Bossier-Shreveport Battle Wings (2009); Albany Panthers (2010); New Orleans VooDoo (2011)

Awards and highlights
- American Conference All-af2 First Team (2008)

Career AFL statistics
- Tackles: 33
- Sacks: 4
- Rushes: 7
- Yards: 19
- Touchdowns: 1
- Stats at ArenaFan.com

James Harris (born June 2, 1982) is an American former professional arena football player who was a fullback/linebacker.

== Early life ==
The son of Ronnie and Bertha Harris, James attended Thomson High School in Thomson, Georgia, where he lettered twice in two season of football.

== College career ==
Harris continued his athletic career at Albany State University, where he lettered three seasons and led the team in tackles and sacks his sophomore, junior and senior seasons.

== Professional career ==
=== South Georgia Wildcats ===
Started professional playing career with the South Georgia Wildcats of AF2 in 2006. He played the 2007 and 2008 season under VooDoo head football coach Derek Stingley. Harris was named to the All-AF2 team in 2008.

=== Bossier-Shreveport Battle Wings ===
In 2009, Harris played with the Bossier-Shreveport Battle Wings, also of AF2.

=== Albany Panthers ===
Harris spent the 2010 season with the Albany Panthers of the Southern Indoor Football League. In only nine games for the Panthers, he led the team in sacks (6.5) and tackles for a loss (9.0)

=== New Orleans VooDoo ===
In 2011, Harris signed to play with the New Orleans VooDoo of the Arena Football League.
