= Tre'von Moehrig =

American football player (born 1999)

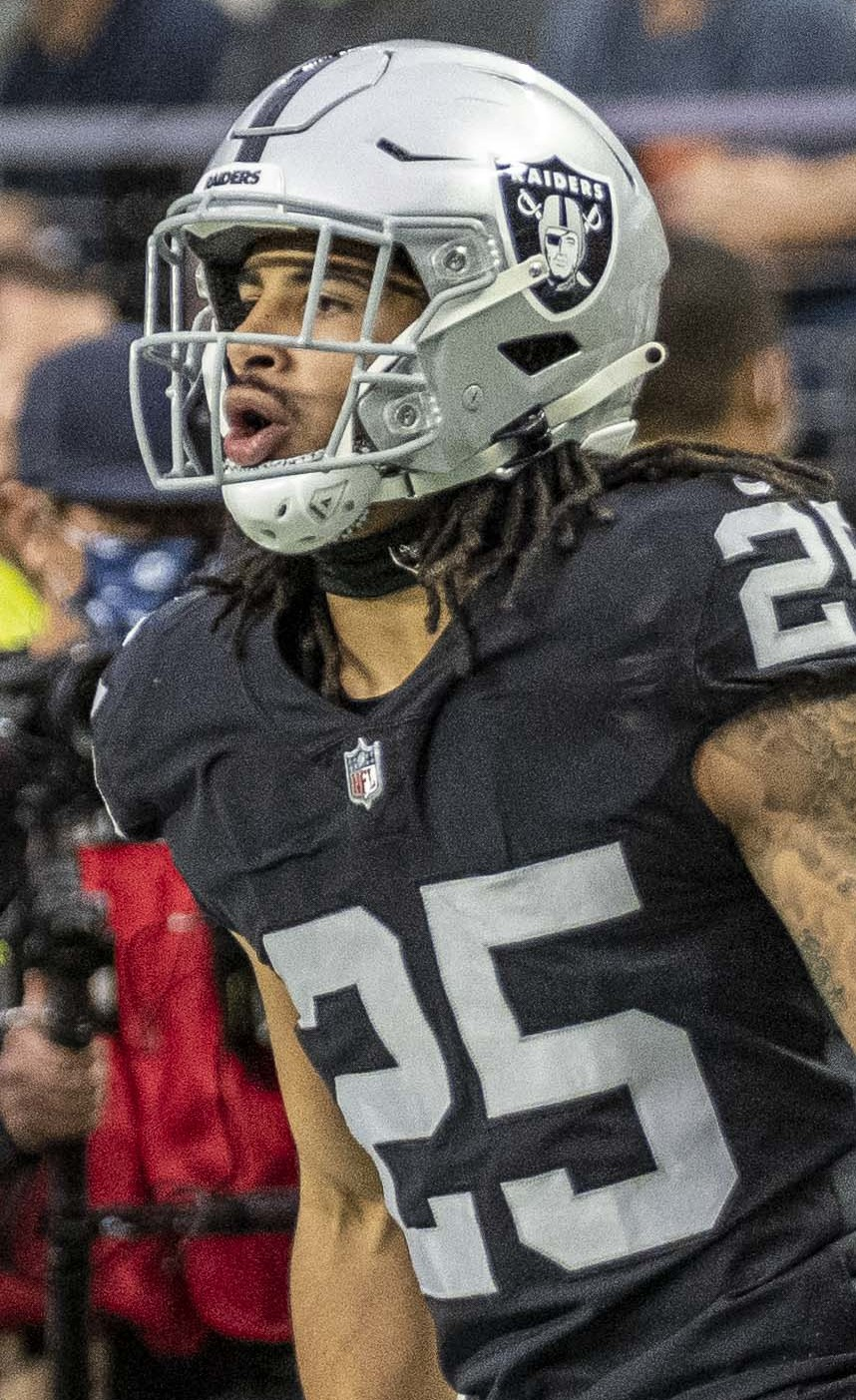
- Moehrig with the Las Vegas Raiders in 2021

No. 7 – Carolina Panthers
- Position: Safety
- Roster status: Active

Personal information
- Born: June 16, 1999 (age 27); Spring Branch, Texas, U.S.
- Listed height: 6 ft 2 in (1.88 m)
- Listed weight: 215 lb (98 kg)

Career information
- High school: Smithson Valley (Spring Branch)
- College: TCU (2018–2020)
- NFL draft: 2021: 2nd round, 43rd overall pick

Career history
- Las Vegas Raiders (2021–2024); Carolina Panthers (2025–present)

Awards and highlights
- PFWA All-Rookie Team (2021); Jim Thorpe Award (2020); 2× First-team All-Big 12 (2019, 2020)

Career NFL statistics as of Week 3, 2026
- Total tackles: 412
- Sacks: 6
- Fumble recoveries: 2
- Pass deflections: 31
- Interceptions: 7
- Stats at Pro Football Reference

Tre'von Moehrig-Woodard (/ˈmɛərɪɡ/ MAIR-igg; born June 16, 1999) is an American professional football safety for the Carolina Panthers of the National Football League (NFL). He played college football for the TCU Horned Frogs and was selected by the Las Vegas Raiders in the second round of the 2021 NFL draft.

== Early life ==
Moehrig attended Smithson Valley High School in Spring Branch, Texas, just north of San Antonio, where he played cornerback and receiver for the Rangers in addition to running track. Prior to his senior season, he announced via Twitter that he was committed to playing college football at Texas Christian University in Fort Worth, Texas. A 4-star safety recruit, he committed to TCU over offers from Colorado, Georgia, Minnesota, Ole Miss, and Stanford, among others.

== College career ==
As a true freshman at TCU in 2018, Moehrig transitioned to safety and made an immediate impact, starting two games on defense and being named the Horned Frogs' Special Teams MVP for the season. He became a full-time starter as a sophomore in 2019 and finished second on the team with four interceptions and 62 tackles. After the season, he was named 1st team All-Big 12.

Prior to Moehrig's junior season in 2020, he was named as the top defensive back in Texas by Dave Campbell's Texas Football, the nation's top returning safety by Pro Football Focus and a preseason All-American by the Walter Camp Football Foundation.

== Professional career ==
=== Pre-draft ===
NFL media analyst Daniel Jeremiah and Michael Renner of Pro Football Focus had Moehrig ranked as the top best safety prospect (16th overall) in the draft. NFL analyst Bucky Brooks and ESPN analyst Mel Kiper Jr. had Moehrig ranked as the No. 1 safety prospect available in the draft. Dane Brugler of The Athletic ranked him as the second best safety prospect entering the draft. Scouts Inc. ranked Moehrig as the best safety prospect (17th overall) in the draft. Cory Giddings of Bleacher Report listed him as the No. 1 safety in the draft (20th overall). NFL draft analysts and scouts unanimously projected him to be selected in the first round of the 2021 NFL draft.

External videos
- 2021 Draft Prospects: Trevon Moehrig
- TCU Pro Day: Trevon Moehrig workout

Pre-draft measurables
Height	Weight	Arm length	Hand span	Wingspan	40-yard dash	10-yard split	20-yard split	20-yard shuttle	Vertical jump	Bench press
6 ft 0 5/8 in (1.84 m)	202 lb (92 kg)	30 5/8 in (0.78 m)	9 3/4 in (0.25 m)	6 ft 1 3/8 in (1.86 m)	4.52 s	1.59 s	2.57 s	4.19 s	33.0 in (0.84 m)	14 reps
All values from Pro Day

=== Las Vegas Raiders ===
==== 2021 ====
The Las Vegas Raiders selected Moehrig in the second round (43rd overall) of the 2021 NFL draft. The Las Vegas Raiders ensured their ability to draft Moehrig by orchestrating a trade that agreed to send their second (48th overall) and fourth round picks (121st overall) in the 2021 NFL draft to the San Francisco 49ers in return for a second (43rd overall) and seventh round (230th overall) pick. He was the third safety to be drafted in 2021 and became the highest drafted safety in the NFL draft from TCU. On June 21, 2021, the Raiders signed Moehrig to a four–year, $7.89 million contract that includes $4.12 million guaranteed upon signing and a signing bonus of $3.10 million.

External videos
- Raiders select Tre'von Moehrig No. 43
- the Call: Tre'von Moehrig is a Raider

Throughout training camp, Moehrig competed to be the starting free safety against Karl Joseph and Dallin Leavitt. Defensive coordinator Gus Bradley selected Moehrig and Johnathan Abram to be the starting safety tandem to begin the regular season.

On September 13, 2021, Moehrig earned his first career start in his professional regular season debut and recorded five combined tackles (three solo) in a 33–27 victory against the Baltimore Ravens. On October 10, 2021, head coach Jon Gruden officially resigned and special teams coordinator Rich Bisaccia was appointed interim head coach for the remainder of the season. On October 17, 2021, Moehrig recorded three combined tackles (two solo), two pass deflections, and made his first career interception off a pass attempt by Teddy Bridgewater intended for wide receiver Courtland Sutton and returned it for 35-yards during a 34–24 win against the Denver Broncos. In Week 10, he collected a season-high six combined tackles (five solo) and deflected a pass during a 41–14 loss to the Kansas City Chiefs. He completed his rookie season in 2021 with a total of 55 combined tackles (36 solo), six pass deflections, and an interception in 17 games and 17 starts and was subsequently named to the PFWA NFL All-Rookie Team. He received an overall grade of 71.0 from Pro Football Focus as a rookie in 2021.

The Las Vegas Raiders finished the 2021 NFL season second in the AFC West with a 10–7 record and earned a Wildcard berth. On January 15, 2022, Moehrig started in his first career playoff game but was limited to one solo tackle in the Raiders' 26–19 loss at the Cincinnati Bengals in the AFC Wildcard Game.

==== 2022 ====
On January 30, 2022, the Las Vegas Raiders hired New England Patriots' offensive coordinator Josh McDaniels as their new head coach. Moehrig entered training camp slated to retain his role as the starting free safety under new defensive coordinator Patrick Graham. Moehrig and Johnathan Abram were named as the starting safeties to start the regular season.

Moehrig was sidelined for two consecutive games (Weeks 2–3) due to a hip injury. In Week 10, he collected a season-high five solo tackles in a 25–20 loss to the Indianapolis Colts. On December 24, 2022, Moehrig racked up a total of seven combined tackles (four solo) in a 13–10 loss at the Pittsburgh Steelers. He completed the 2022 NFL season with 55 combined tackles (37 solo) and five pass deflections in 15 games and 13 starts as the Raiders finished with a 6–11 record.

==== 2023 ====
He returned as the starting free safety in 2023 and was paired with newly acquired free agent Marcus Epps. In Week 4, he recorded six solo tackles, a season-high two pass deflections, and intercepted a pass by Justin Herbert during a 24–17 loss at the Los Angeles Chargers. The following week, Moehrig had five combined tackles (three solo) and made his first career sack on Jordan Love in a 17–13 win against the Green Bay Packers. On October 31, 2023, the Las Vegas Raiders announced the firing of General manager David Ziegler and head coach Josh McDaniels after falling to a 3–5 record and named linebackers coach Antonio Pierce as their interim head coach. On November 19, 2023, Moehrig tied his season-high of ten combined tackles (seven solo) as the Raiders lost, 20–13, at the Miami Dolphins in Week 11. He finished the 2023 NFL season with 83 combined tackles (65 solo), eight pass deflections, a career-high three interceptions, and a career-high two sacks while starting in all 17 games. He received an overall grade of 70.2 from Pro Football Focus in 2023.

==== 2024 ====
On January 19, 2024, the Las Vegas Raiders officially promoted Pierce to be their new head coach after he led the Raiders to a 5–4 record to end 2023. Patrick Graham returned as defensive coordinator and chose to retain Moehrig and Marcus Epps as the starting safety duo alongside starting cornerbacks, Nate Hobbs and Jack Jones.

On October 27, 2024, Moehrig made nine combined tackles (five solo), a pass deflection, and intercepted a pass by Patrick Mahomes intended for tight end Travis Kelce during a 24–20 loss to the Kansas City Chiefs. The following week, he collected a career-high 13 combined tackles (eight solo) and was credited with half a sack in a 41–24 loss at the Cincinnati Bengals in Week 10. In Week 14, Moehrig made eight combined tackles (five solo), a career-high three pass deflections, recovered a fumble, and was credited with half a sack in a 28–13 loss at the Tampa Bay Buccaneers. He completed the 2024 NFL season with 104 combined tackles (64 solo), ten pass deflections, two interceptions, two fumble recoveries, and one sack while he started all 17 games. He received an overall grade of 67.5 from Pro Football Focus, which ranked 59th among 171 qualifying safeties in 2024.

=== Carolina Panthers ===
On March 12, 2025, the Carolina Panthers signed Moehrig to a three–year, $51 million contract that includes $34.50 million guaranteed and a signing bonus of $18.00 million. In Week 9, Moehrig recorded five tackles, two for a loss, two pass breakups, and an interception in a 16-13 win over the Green Bay Packers, earning NFC Defensive Player of the Week. During a Week 12 game against the San Francisco 49ers, Moehrig punched Jauan Jennings in the groin area, which resulted in a one game suspension without pay. He started 16 games in 2025, recording 103 tackles (third on the team), three sacks, two passes defensed, and one interception.

== NFL career statistics ==
Legend
**Bold**	Career high

=== Regular season ===
Year	Team	Games		Tackles					Interceptions						Fumbles				
Year	Team	GP	GS	Cmb	Solo	Ast	Sck	TFL	Int	Yds	Avg	Lng	TD	PD	FF	Fmb	FR	Yds	TD
2021	LV	17	17	55	36	19	0.0	0	1	35	35.0	35	0	6	0	0	0	0	0
2022	LV	15	13	55	37	18	0.0	2	0	0	0.0	0	0	5	0	0	0	0	0
2023	LV	17	17	83	**65**	18	2.0	1	**3**	**41**	13.7	25	0	8	0	0	0	0	0
2024	LV	17	17	**104**	64	**40**	1.0	5	2	28	14.0	16	0	**10**	0	0	**2**	0	0
2025	CAR	16	16	103	**65**	38	**3.0**	**14**	1	36	**36.0**	**36**	0	2	0	0	0	0	0
2026	CAR	3	3	12	5	7	0.0	1	0	0	0.0	0	0	0	0	0	0	0	0
Career		85	83	412	272	140	6.0	23	7	140	20.0	36	0	31	0	0	2	0	0

=== Postseason ===
Year	Team	Games		Tackles					Interceptions						Fumbles				
Year	Team	GP	GS	Cmb	Solo	Ast	Sck	TFL	Int	Yds	Avg	Lng	TD	PD	FF	Fmb	FR	Yds	TD
2021	LV	1	1	1	**1**	0	0.0	0	0	0	0.0	0	0	0	0	0	0	0	0
2025	CAR	1	1	**3**	**1**	**2**	0.0	0	0	0	0.0	0	0	0	0	0	0	0	0
Career		2	2	4	2	2	0.0	0	0	0	0.0	0	0	0	0	0	0	0	0
