= Bulverde =

Bulverde may refer to:

- Bulverde, Texas, United States, a town
- PXA27x, an Intel XScale processing chip
