= Zebedee (disambiguation) =

Zebedee (zibhdi, "the gift of God"; cf. Zebadiah) was the Biblical father of James and John.

Zebedee may also refer to:

== People ==
- Zebedee Armstrong (October 11, 1911 – 1993), an American outsider artist
- Zebedee E. Cliff (born 1864), an American architect, builder, and politician
- Zebedee Coltrin (7 September 1804 – 21 July 1887), a Mormon pioneer
- Zebedee Jones (b. March 12, 1970), an English painter
- Zebedee Soanes (b. 1976), a continuity announcer on BBC Radio 4

== Popular culture ==
- zebedee, a parasitic vector engineered to destroy Thread in the novel All the Weyrs of Pern
- Zebedee, a character in the BBC children's programme The Magic Roundabout
- Zebedee Tring, a past character in the BBC radio series The Archers
- a character from the children's television series TUGS, see List of Tugs characters#Zebedee
- New Zebedee, a fictional town which appears in children's works by John Bellairs and Brad Strickland

== See also ==
- Zeberdee, a character in the movie The Football Factory
- ZBD (disambiguation)
- Zebedee, a handheld 3D laser mapping system
