= Casper Brinkley =

American football player (born 1985)

No. 64
- Position: Defensive end

Personal information
- Born: July 12, 1985 (age 41); Thomson, Georgia, U.S.
- Listed height: 6 ft 2 in (1.88 m)
- Listed weight: 259 lb (117 kg)

Career information
- College: Georgia Military, South Carolina
- NFL draft: 2008: undrafted

Career history
- Carolina Panthers (2008–2009)*
- * Offseason or practice squad member only

Casper Terrell Brinkley (born July 12, 1985) is an American former football defensive end for the Carolina Panthers of the National Football League (NFL). He was signed by the Panthers as an undrafted free agent in 2008, but was released by the team on September 5, 2009. He played college football at South Carolina.

== College career ==
Brinkley played college football at the University of South Carolina. He played in 25 games producing 103 tackles and ten sacks. He majored in African-American studies.

== Personal life ==
Brinkley's twin brother, Jasper Brinkley was drafted by the Minnesota Vikings in the 5th round of 2009.
