= ZBD =

ZBD may refer to:

- ZBD-03, a Chinese airborne infantry fighting vehicle
- ZBD-04, a Chinese infantry fighting vehicle
- ZBD-2000, a Chinese amphibious tracked armored fighting vehicle
- ZBD-86, a Chinese infantry fighting vehicle
- Zafarabad Junction railway station, railway station in Jaunpur district, Uttar Pradesh, India
- ZBD transformer, a kind of closed-core transformer

== See also ==
- Zebedee (disambiguation)
