= Donald H. Balch =

United States Air Force general (1931–2007)

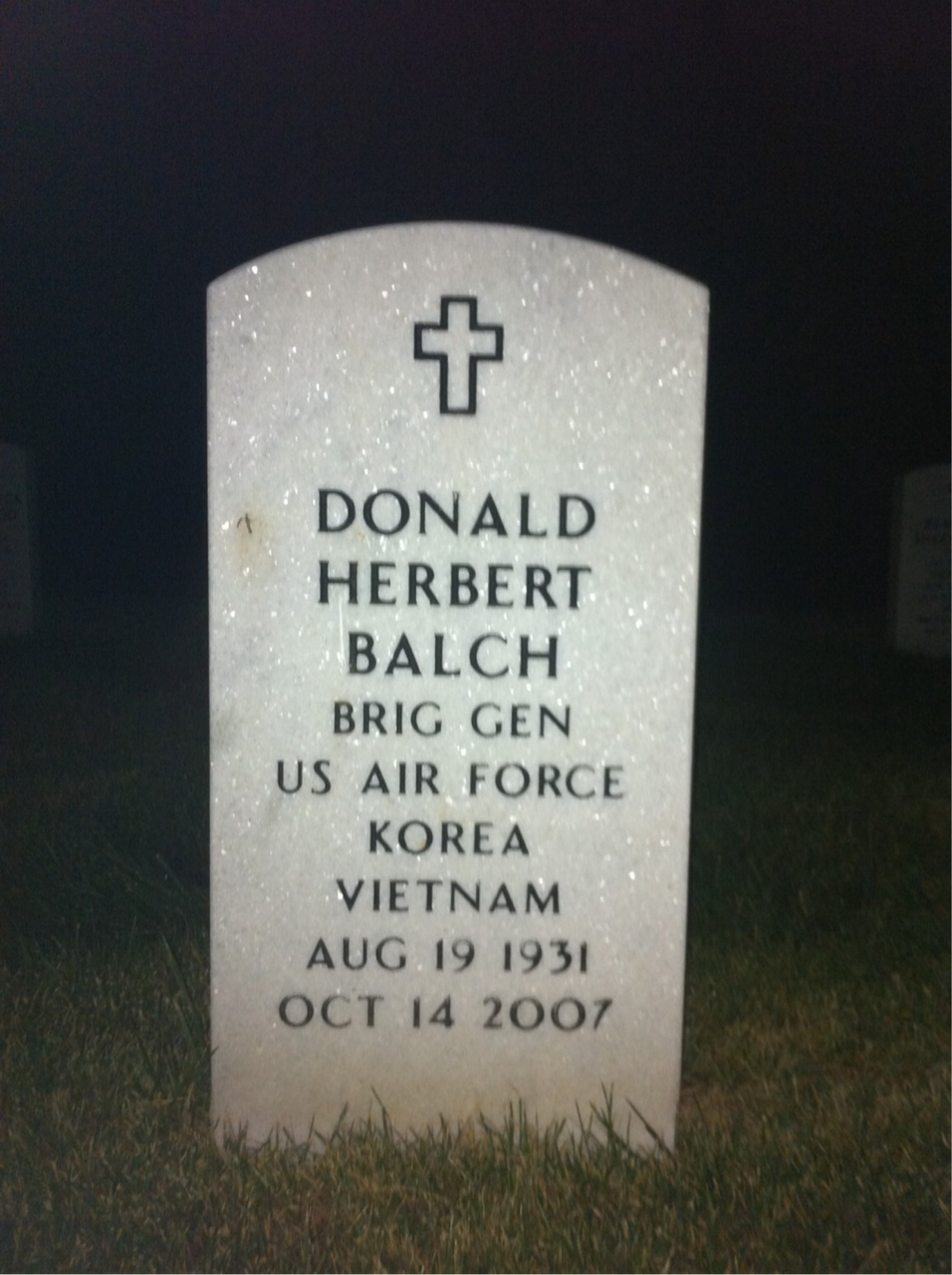
- Grave at Arlington National Cemetery
- Born: Donald Herbert Balch; August 19, 1931; Bellows Falls, Vermont, U.S.
- Died: October 14, 2007 (aged 76); Bulverde, Texas, U.S.
- Burial place: Arlington National Cemetery
- Children: Gareth W. Balch, Nathalie Balch, Jennifer Balch
- Military career
- Allegiance: United States of America
- Branch: United States Air Force
- Service years: 1954–1986
- Rank: Brigadier general
- Commands: 512th Military Airlift Wing; 349th Military Airlift Wing; 440th Tactical Airlift Wing
- Conflicts: Vietnam War
- Awards: Legion of Merit; Armed Forces Reserve Medal; National Defense Service Medal; Vietnam Service Medal; Outstanding Unit Award; Air Force Longevity Service Award; Air Force Training Ribbon; Vietnam Gallantry Cross

Donald Herbert Balch (August 19, 1931 – October 14, 2007) was a brigadier general in the United States Air Force.

== Biography ==
Balch was born on August 19, 1931, in Bellows Falls, Vermont. He later attended the University of Vermont and the New England School of Law and married and had three children. His son, Gareth, also served in the Air Force. Balch was killed in an automobile accident on October 14, 2007, in Bulverde, Texas, and is buried at Arlington National Cemetery.

== Career ==
Balch was commissioned an officer in the Air Force in 1954. In 1961 he entered the Air Force Reserve Command. He served in the Vietnam War and commanded the 512th Military Airlift Wing based at Dover Air Force Base in Dover, Delaware, the 349th Military Airlift Wing based at Travis Air Force Base in Fairfield, California, and the 440th Tactical Airlift Wing based at General Mitchell International Airport in Milwaukee, Wisconsin. Balch retired in 1986.

Awards he received include the Legion of Merit, the Armed Forces Reserve Medal, the National Defense Service Medal, the Vietnam Service Medal, the Outstanding Unit Award, the Air Force Longevity Service Award, the Air Force Training Ribbon, and the Vietnam Gallantry Cross.
