= Jasper Brinkley =

American football player (born 1985)

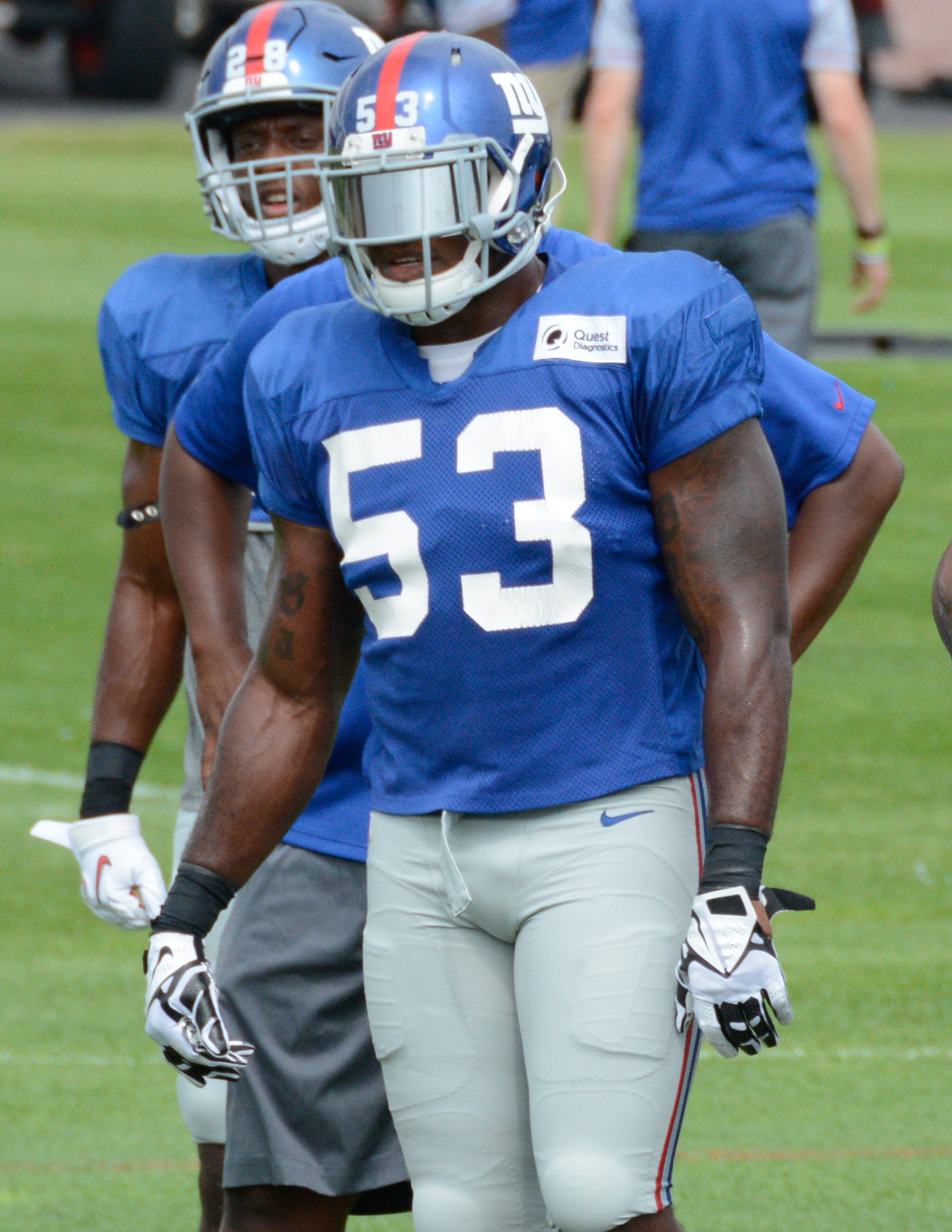
- Brinkley with the New York Giants in 2016

No. 54, 52, 53
- Position: Linebacker

Personal information
- Born: July 12, 1985 (age 41); Thomson, Georgia, U.S.
- Listed height: 6 ft 2 in (1.88 m)
- Listed weight: 255 lb (116 kg)

Career information
- High school: Thomson (GA)
- College: South Carolina
- NFL draft: 2009: 5th round, 150th overall pick

Career history
- Minnesota Vikings (2009–2012); Arizona Cardinals (2013); Minnesota Vikings (2014); Dallas Cowboys (2015)*; New York Giants (2015)
- * Offseason or practice squad member only

Awards and highlights
- First-team All-SEC (2006); Second-team All-SEC (2008)

Career NFL statistics
- Total tackles: 316
- Sacks: 2.0
- Forced fumbles: 9
- Fumble recoveries: 1
- Stats at Pro Football Reference

Jasper Jerrell Brinkley (born July 12, 1985) is an American former professional football player who was a linebacker in the National Football League (NFL). He played college football for the University of South Carolina. He was selected by the Minnesota Vikings in the fifth round of 2009 NFL draft. He also played for the Arizona Cardinals and New York Giants.

== Early life ==
Brinkley attended Thomson High School where he started at linebacker, while receiving first-team All-area and All-state honors.

He accepted a football scholarship from the University of South Carolina, where he played for the South Carolina Gamecocks football team as junior college transfer from Georgia Military College alongside his twin brother Casper. He started 29 of 30 games. He finished his career with 298 total tackles, 27.5 sacks, 30.5 tackles for a loss and 10 interceptions. As a senior, Brinkley captured All-Southeastern Conference (SEC) first-team honors as he started all but 1 game for the Gamecocks and ranked 2nd on the squad with 73 tackles.

== Professional career ==
=== Pre-draft ===
After the end of the 2008 season, Brinkley was selected to play in the East-West Shrine Game and was a participant at the 2009 NFL Combine in Indianapolis.

Pre-draft measurables
| Height | Weight | Arm length | Hand span | 40-yard dash | 10-yard split | 20-yard split | 20-yard shuttle | Three-cone drill | Vertical jump | Broad jump | Bench press |
|---|---|---|---|---|---|---|---|---|---|---|---|
| 6 ft 1 5/8 in (1.87 m) | 252 lb (114 kg) | 33 in (0.84 m) | 9 1/4 in (0.23 m) | 4.72 s | 1.64 s | 2.77 s | 4.32 s | 6.92 s | 35.5 in (0.90 m) | 9 ft 6 in (2.90 m) | 26 reps |
All values from NFL Combine/Pro Day

=== Minnesota Vikings (first stint) ===
The Minnesota Vikings selected Brinkley in the fifth round (150th overall) of 2009 NFL draft. On June 30 Brinkley signed a 4-year contract with Minnesota. Brinkley projected to serve as the backup to E. J. Henderson at middle linebacker. His spot on the depth chart was confirmed when Henderson went down with an injury to his femur after a collision with teammate Jamarca Sanford in week 13 at Arizona. Brinkley stepped into the game in the fourth quarter, recording five tackles for negative 4 yards on Arizona running back Tim Hightower.

On December 13, 2009 (week 14), Brinkley made his first start against the Cincinnati Bengals. He recorded 7 tackles en route to a 30–10 victory over the Bengals. Brinkley has had a very close, apprentice-like relationship with Henderson who mentored him as a rookie throughout training camp and his first professional season, even quizzing him while watching film together.

On December 20 (week 15), Brinkley started against the Carolina Panthers in a devastating 7–26 loss. He performed admirably, recording 12 tackles (including 5 tackles of Panther's running-back Jonathan Stewart: a 14-yard loss, a tackle for no gain, and another for only a 1-yard gain) and 2 forced fumbles, the first of his career.

On December 28 against the Chicago Bears, the Vikings suffered a crushing 36–30 overtime loss - their second in a row to a team that was not in playoff contention. Brinkley had 9 tackles, helping the defense to hold Chicago running-back Matt Forte to only 52 yards.

On November 16, 2012, Brinkley was fined $21,000 for a hit to the head against the Detroit Lions.

=== Arizona Cardinals ===
Brinkley signed with the Arizona Cardinals on March 14, 2013. He played in 15 games with 3 starts. He was released on February 28, 2014.

=== Minnesota Vikings (second stint) ===
On March 9, 2014, Brinkley was re-signed by the Minnesota Vikings. Brinkley switched jersey numbers with Gerald Hodges, while playing 16 games with 11 starts at middle linebacker.

=== Dallas Cowboys ===
On March 12, 2015, Brinkley signed a two-year deal with the Dallas Cowboys, as insurance in case the team couldn't re-sign Rolando McClain. During training camp he was passed on the depth chart by other linebackers. Even though his contract included $2 million guaranteed in earnings, he was released on September 7 to make room for offensive tackle Jordan Mills.

=== New York Giants ===
On September 9, 2015, Brinkley was signed by the New York Giants. He played in 15 games with 9 starts. On March 29, 2016, he re-signed with the Giants. He was released on September 5.

== NFL career statistics ==
Legend
| **Bold** | Career high |

=== Regular season ===
| Year | Team | Games | | Tackles | | | | | Interceptions | | | | | Fumbles | | | |
| Year | Team | GP | GS | Cmb | Solo | Ast | Sck | TFL | Int | Yds | TD | Lng | PD | FF | FR | Yds | TD |
|---|---|---|---|---|---|---|---|---|---|---|---|---|---|---|---|---|---|
| 2009 | MIN | **16** | 4 | 31 | 30 | 1 | 0.0 | 2 | 0 | 0 | 0 | 0 | 0 | 1 | 0 | 0 | 0 |
| 2010 | MIN | **16** | 0 | 17 | 15 | 2 | 0.0 | 1 | 0 | 0 | 0 | 0 | 0 | 0 | 0 | 0 | 0 |
| 2012 | MIN | **16** | **15** | **100** | **64** | **36** | 0.0 | 2 | 0 | 0 | 0 | 0 | **3** | 3 | 0 | 0 | 0 |
| 2013 | ARI | 15 | 3 | 27 | 23 | 4 | 0.0 | 4 | 0 | 0 | 0 | 0 | 1 | 0 | 0 | 0 | 0 |
| 2014 | MIN | **16** | 11 | 74 | 53 | 21 | **1.0** | 3 | 0 | 0 | 0 | 0 | 0 | 1 | 0 | 0 | 0 |
| 2015 | NYG | 15 | 9 | 67 | 49 | 18 | **1.0** | **5** | 0 | 0 | 0 | 0 | 0 | **4** | **1** | 0 | 0 |
| Career | | 94 | 42 | 316 | 234 | 82 | 2.0 | 17 | 0 | 0 | 0 | 0 | 4 | 9 | 1 | 0 | 0 |

=== Playoffs ===
| Year | Team | Games | | Tackles | | | | | Interceptions | | | | | Fumbles | | | |
| Year | Team | GP | GS | Cmb | Solo | Ast | Sck | TFL | Int | Yds | TD | Lng | PD | FF | FR | Yds | TD |
|---|---|---|---|---|---|---|---|---|---|---|---|---|---|---|---|---|---|
| 2009 | MIN | **2** | 0 | **12** | **10** | 2 | 0.0 | 0 | 0 | 0 | 0 | 0 | 0 | 0 | 0 | 0 | 0 |
| 2012 | MIN | 1 | 0 | 5 | 1 | **4** | 0.0 | 0 | 0 | 0 | 0 | 0 | 0 | 0 | 0 | 0 | 0 |
| Career | | 3 | 0 | 17 | 11 | 6 | 0.0 | 0 | 0 | 0 | 0 | 0 | 0 | 0 | 0 | 0 | 0 |

== Personal life ==
His twin brother Casper was a defensive end for the Carolina Panthers. Brinkley is also married to Olympic hurdler Kellie Wells-Brinkley.

His son, Dakyus, was a four-star recruit who will be playing college football for the Kansas Jayhawks football.
