= Eddie Lee Ivery =

American football player (born 1957)

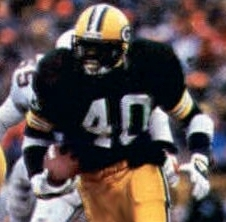
- Ivery with the Green Bay Packers in 1983

No. 40
- Position: Running back

Personal information
- Born: July 30, 1957 (age 69); McDuffie County, Georgia, U.S.
- Listed height: 6 ft 0 in (1.83 m)
- Listed weight: 210 lb (95 kg)

Career information
- High school: Thomson (GA)
- College: Georgia Tech
- NFL draft: 1979: 1st round, 15th overall pick

Career history
- Green Bay Packers (1979–1987)

Awards and highlights
- George Halas Award (1983); Second-team All-American (1978); Georgia Tech Athletic Hall of Fame (1983)

Career NFL statistics
- Rushing yards: 2,933
- Rushing average: 4.4
- Rushing touchdowns: 23
- Stats at Pro Football Reference

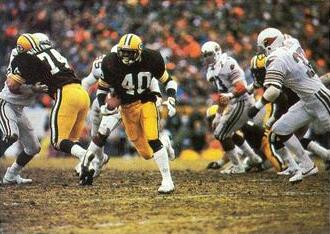
Ivery (40) rushing the ball against the Cardinals in the 1982 NFC First Round Playoff game.

Eddie Lee Ivery (born July 30, 1957) is an American former professional football player who was a running back for the Green Bay Packers of the National Football League (NFL).

== Early life ==
Ivery was born in McDuffie County, Georgia. He played high school football at Thomson High School in Thomson, Georgia. During the 1974 season, Ivery rushed for 1,710 yards.

== College career ==
He played college football for the Georgia Tech Yellow Jackets football team from 1975 to 1978, and was an AP and UPI All-American in his senior season of 1978. Ivery was inducted into the Georgia Tech Athletic Hall of Fame in 1983. He finished eighth in the 1978 Heisman Trophy voting with 11 first place votes, 19 second place votes, 10 third place votes and 81 votes total.

=== College statistics ===
Legend
	Led Independents
	Independent record
	Led the NCAA
	NCAA record
**Bold**	Career high

College rushing & receiving statistics*
Season	School	Games	Att	Yds	Avg	TD	Rec	Yds	Avg	TD
Team		Rushing					Receiving			
1975	Georgia Tech	**11**	43	301	**7.0**	1	0	0	0	0
1976	Georgia Tech	**11**	146	754	5.2	6	4	75	18.8	0
1977	Georgia Tech	**11**	153	900	5.9	6	3	93	**31.0**	**1**
1978	Georgia Tech	**11**	**267**	**1,562**	5.9	**9**	**20**	**238**	11.9	**1**
Career	Georgia Tech	44	609	3,517	5.8	22	27	406	15.0	2

* Includes bowl games.

=== College records and honors ===
- NCAA single game highest average gain per rush-(Min. 26 rushes) - 13.7 vs. Air Force, Nov. 11, 1978
- Division One single game rushing record- 356 yards vs. Air Force, Nov. 11, 1978
- Georgia Tech Football single season rushing yards leader- 1,562 yards
- Georgia Tech 3rd in career (1975–78) rushing yards- 3,517 in 609 attempts and 22 TD.
- Georgia Tech 4th in career all-purpose yards- 4,324
- Georgia Tech Athletics Hall of Fame (1983)

== Professional career ==
Ivery was selected in the first round of the 1979 NFL draft. He played for eight seasons as a running back with the Green Bay Packers. He was forced to retire after suffering a leg injury.

== NFL career statistics ==
Legend
**Bold**	Career high

=== Regular season ===
Year	Team	Games		Rushing					Receiving				
Year	Team	GP	GS	Att	Yds	Avg	Lng	TD	Rec	Yds	Avg	Lng	TD
1979	GNB	1	0	3	24	**8.0**	11	0	0	0	0.0	0	0
1980	GNB	16	16	**202**	**831**	4.1	38	3	**50**	**481**	9.6	46	1
1981	GNB	1	1	14	72	5.1	28	1	2	10	5.0	8	0
1982	GNB	9	9	127	453	3.6	32	**9**	16	186	11.6	**62**	1
1983	GNB	8	8	86	340	4.0	21	2	16	139	8.7	17	1
1984	GNB	10	5	99	552	5.6	**49**	6	19	141	7.4	18	1
1985	GNB	15	10	132	636	4.8	34	2	28	270	9.6	24	**2**
1986	GNB	12	1	4	25	6.3	15	0	31	385	**12.4**	42	1
		72	50	667	2,933	4.4	49	23	162	1,612	10.0	62	7

=== Playoffs ===
Year	Team	Games		Rushing					Receiving				
Year	Team	GP	GS	Att	Yds	Avg	Lng	TD	Rec	Yds	Avg	Lng	TD
1982	GNB	2	2	20	91	4.6	18	1	2	29	14.5	25	1
		2	2	20	91	4.6	18	1	2	29	14.5	25	1

== Life after football ==
Since 2000, Ivery has worked as assistant strength coach for Georgia Tech after completing a stint with the McDuffie County Board of Education and coaching at Thomson High School, where he played high school football. He completed his degree at Georgia Tech in 1992.

== Relevant Publications ==
- Gentry, Jerry. Deceptive Speed: Eddie Lee Ivery's Run through Tech, Titletown, and Temptation. Macon, GA: Mercer University Press.
