= Thomson High School =

Public high school in Thomson, Georgia, United States

Location
- 1160 White Oak Road; Thomson, Georgia; United States
- Coordinates: 33°28′26″N 82°28′31″W

Information
- Type: Public high school
- Teaching staff: 59.30 (FTE)
- Grades: 9-12
- Gender: Coeducational
- Enrollment: 982 (2023-2024)
- Student to teacher ratio: 16.56
- Campus: Exurban
- Colors: Black and gold
- Mascot: Bulldog
- Website: https://ths.mcduffie.k12.ga.us/

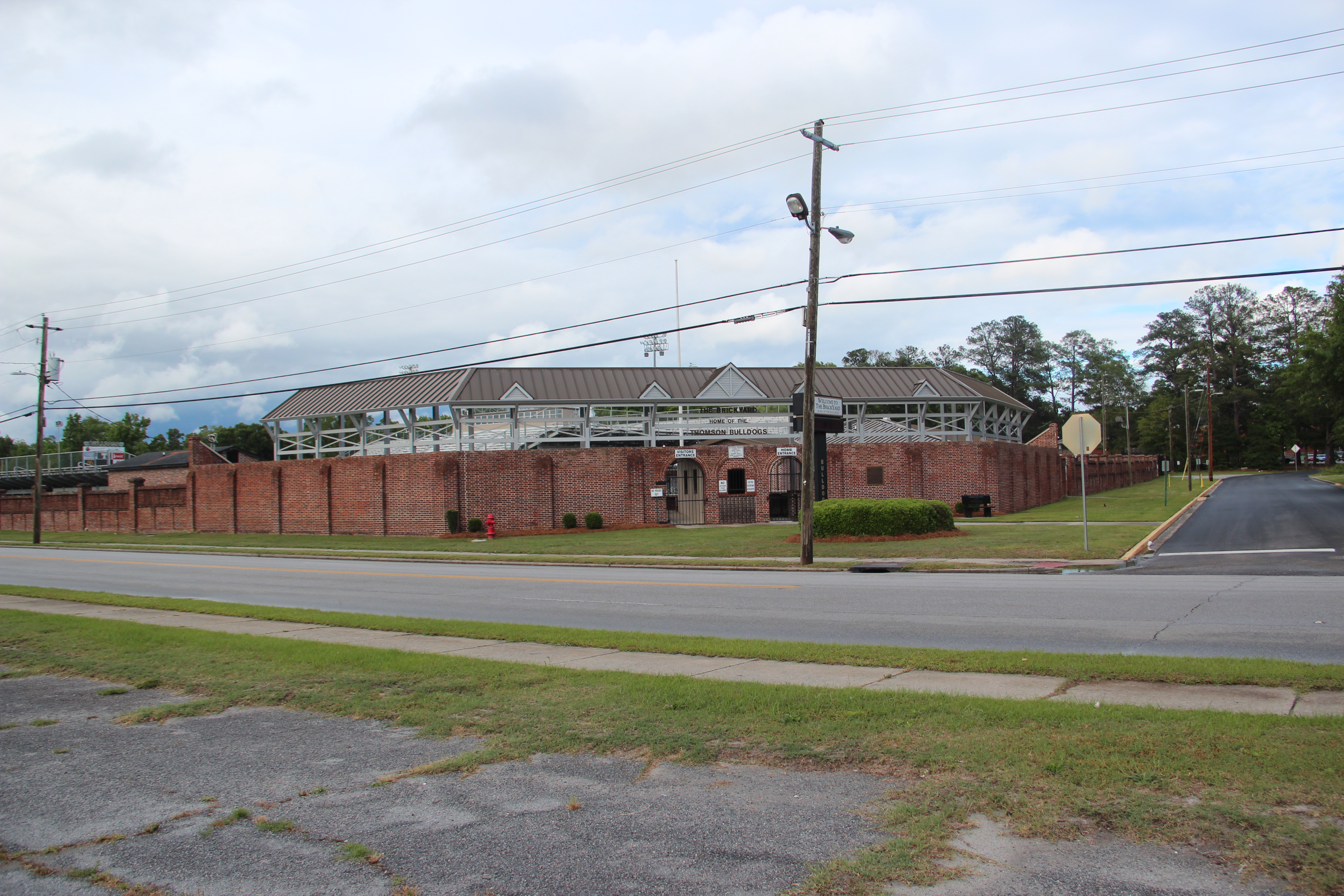
The Brickyard, Thomson High School's football stadium

Thomson High School is a public high school located in Thomson, Georgia, United States. It is the only high school in the McDuffie County School District.

== Demographics ==
- White, 44.93%
- Black, 51.68%
- Hispanic, 2.02%
- Asian, 0.28%
- Multi-racial, 0.96%

== Notable alumni ==
- John Atkins professional football player currently on Detroit Lions practice squad
- Jasper Brinkley, former NFL player
- Vonteego Cummings, former NBA player, currently plays in Greece
- Darius Eubanks, former NFL player
- Ray Guy, retired NFL Hall of Fame punter for the Oakland Raiders
- James Harris, former NFL player
- Eddie Lee Ivery, retired NFL player for the Green Bay Packers
- Franklin Langham, professional golfer
- Jerry Mays, retired NFL running back for the San Diego Chargers
- Emerson Spartz, MuggleNet founder
