= Ray Crouse =

American gridiron football player (born 1959)

No. 21
- Position: Running back

Personal information
- Born: March 16, 1959 (age 67); Oakland, California, U.S.
- Listed height: 5 ft 11 in (1.80 m)
- Listed weight: 214 lb (97 kg)

Career information
- High school: Encinal High School; Berkeley High School (California)
- College: UNLV

Career history
- Calgary Stampeders (1983); Green Bay Packers (1984); BC Lions (1986–1987)

Career statistics
- Games played: 16
- Rushing attempts: 53
- Rushing yards: 169
- Stats at Pro Football Reference

Marlon Ray Crouse is a former running back in the National Football League.

== Biography ==
Crouse was born Marlon Ray Crouse on March 16, 1959, in Oakland, California. His son, Michael Crouse, is a professional baseball player.

== Career ==
Crouse played in 16 games with the Calgary Stampeders of the Canadian Football League in 1983, then appeared in 16 games for the 1984 Green Bay Packers of the National Football League, and then returned to the CFL to play 16 games total for the BC Lions in the 1986 and 1987 seasons.

He played at the collegiate level at the University of Nevada, Las Vegas.
