= Darius Eubanks =

American football player (born 1991)

Miami Dolphins
- Title: Special teams assistant

Personal information
- Born: July 12, 1991 (age 35); Thomson, Georgia, U.S.
- Listed height: 6 ft 2 in (1.88 m)
- Listed weight: 222 lb (101 kg)

Career information
- High school: Thomson
- College: Georgia Southern (2009–2012)
- NFL draft: 2013: undrafted

Career history

Playing
- Minnesota Vikings (2013)*; Cleveland Browns (2013–2014); Dallas Cowboys (2015)*; Tampa Bay Buccaneers (2015); Dallas Cowboys (2016)*
- * Offseason or practice squad member only

Coaching
- Arkansas (2017) Graduate assistant; Samford (2018–2019) Safeties coach; Samford (2020) Defensive backs coach; Georgia State (2021) Safeties coach; Liberty (2022) Defensive backs coach; Georgia Southern (2023–2024) Safeties coach & nickels coach; Georgia Tech (2025) Linebackers coach; Miami Dolphins (2026–present) Special teams assistant

Career NFL statistics
- Total tackles: 12
- Stats at Pro Football Reference

Darius Eubanks (born July 12, 1991) is an American former professional football player who was a linebacker in the National Football League (NFL). He currently serves as the assistant special teams coordinator for the Miami Dolphins of the NFL. He was signed by the Minnesota Vikings as an undrafted free agent in 2013. He played college football for the Georgia Southern Eagles.

== Early life ==
He attended Thomson High School. He was selected to the First Team Augusta Chronicle/WJBF All-Area twice at defensive back. He was a two-time All-State pick by the Atlanta Journal-Constitution. He earned First Team honors his senior year in high school.

== College career ==
He was selected to the SoCon All-Freshman team in his freshman season.

== Professional career ==
Pre-draft measurables
| Height | Weight | Arm length | Hand span | Wingspan | 40-yard dash | 10-yard split | 20-yard split | 20-yard shuttle | Three-cone drill | Vertical jump | Broad jump | Bench press |
|---|---|---|---|---|---|---|---|---|---|---|---|---|
| 6 ft 1 1/8 in (1.86 m) | 215 lb (98 kg) | 32 1/4 in (0.82 m) | 8 3/4 in (0.22 m) | 6 ft 5 1/4 in (1.96 m) | 4.48 s | 1.60 s | 2.53 s | 4.17 s | 6.95 s | 35.0 in (0.89 m) | 10 ft 5 in (3.18 m) | 23 reps |
All values from Pro Day

=== Minnesota Vikings ===
On April 30, 2013, he signed with the Minnesota Vikings as an undrafted free agent.

On August 31, 2013, he was released.

=== Cleveland Browns ===
On September 2, 2013, he signed with Cleveland Browns to join the practice squad. On October 26, 2013, he was promoted to the active roster from the practice squad. The Browns placed Eubanks on injured reserve with a shoulder injury on August 26, 2014.

On August 9, 2015, Eubanks was waived.

=== Dallas Cowboys ===
On October 20, 2015, Eubanks signed with the Dallas Cowboys.

On December 15, 2015, Eubanks was waived.

=== Tampa Bay Buccaneers ===
On December 21, 2015, the Tampa Bay Buccaneers signed Eubanks to the practice squad. On January 1, 2016, Eubanks was promoted to the active roster.

On April 29, 2016, Eubanks was waived.

== Coaching career ==
=== Arkansas ===
Eubanks' first coaching experience came in 2017 when he joined Bret Bielema's staff at Arkansas as a graduate assistant working with the defensive line.

=== Samford ===
Eubanks first full-time position came on Chris Hatcher's staff at Samford. Eubanks was responsible for the safeties in 2018 and 2019, before taking over the whole defensive backfield and adding assistant special teams coordinator duties prior to the 2020 season, that was eventually played in the spring of 2021.

=== Georgia State ===
Following the 2021 spring season, Eubanks was hired as the co-defensive coordinator at Western Carolina, but shortly after, was hired to coach the safeties on Shawn Elliott's staff at Georgia State.

=== Liberty ===
On New Years Day, 2022, it was reported that Eubanks would be joining Hugh Freeze's staff at Liberty coaching the defensive backs.

=== Georgia Southern ===
On March 16, 2023, it was reported that Eubanks would be joining Clay Helton's staff at his alma mater Georgia Southern to coach for the safeties and nickels.

=== Georgia Tech ===
On February 28, 2025, Eubanks joined Brent Key's coaching staff at Georgia Tech to coach for the linebackers.

=== Miami Dolphins ===
On February 2, 2026, Eubanks was hired to serve as the assistant special teams coordinator for the Miami Dolphins under new head coach Jeff Hafley.
