= Tony DeLuca (American football) =

American football player (1960–1999)

No. 98
- Position: Nose tackle

Personal information
- Born: November 16, 1960; Greenwich, Connecticut, U.S.
- Died: April 16, 1999 (aged 38); Stamford, Connecticut, U.S.
- Listed height: 6 ft 4 in (1.93 m)
- Listed weight: 250 lb (113 kg)

Career information
- High school: Greenwich, Milford Academy
- College: Rhode Island
- NFL draft: 1984: undrafted

Career history
- Los Angeles Rams (1984)*; Green Bay Packers (1984 - 1985*); San Diego Chargers (1986)*; Buffalo Bills (1987)
- * Offseason or practice squad member only
- Stats at Pro Football Reference

Anthony Lawrence DeLuca (November 16, 1960 – April 16, 1999) was a former nose tackle in the National Football League (NFL). He was a member of the Green Bay Packers during the 1984 NFL season.
