= Zebedee Armstrong =

American outsider artist

- Born: October 11, 1911; McDuffie County, Georgia
- Died: 1993 (aged 81–82)
- Occupation: outsider artist
- Spouse: Ulamay Demmons

Zebedee B. Armstrong (October 11, 1911 – 1993), aka Z.B. Armstrong, was an outsider artist known for his doomsday calendars.

== Life ==
Armstrong was born in McDuffie County, Georgia near Thomson, Georgia. He attended school until eighth grade when he left and began working in the local cotton fields. He married Ulamay Demmons in 1929 and had two daughters. For much of his life, he worked picking cotton on the local Mack McCormick farm. He supplemented this income by building furniture for people in his community. One of the things Armstrong was most skilled at building were wooden and concrete vaults, which were especially popular in rural communities because of a distrust of banks in the aftermath of the Great Depression. These vaults often incorporated a wide variety of types of locks, handles, and wheels. After his wife died in 1969, he began to work at the Thomson Box Factory, staying there until 1982. Religion was a significant part of Armstrong's life. He was a member of The Solomon Hodges Burial Society, an organization that helped the poor pay for proper burials for family members who had died.

== Art ==
In 1972, he claimed to be visited by an angel who warned him saying, "Our time has gone to waste...Judgement day will come and at what hour only God knows." After this vision, Armstrong became increasingly reclusive. He became increasingly focused on The Book of Revelation and the idea that time was coming to an end.

He began to make calendars, in the form of three-dimensional wooden sculptures, that would help predict the date on which Judgement Day would start. Armstrong would add grids to these calendars drawn in black, red and blue permanent marker. Armstrong referred to this process as "taping with time." He would also write dates and scripture passages on the calendars in order help further discern the date of Judgement Day. Armstrong went on to construct almost 1,500 box calendars with the aim of trying to determine the exact date of the approaching doomsday.

These calendars were built in Armstrong's hand-built two room home. While one room served as his living space, the other room served as his workspace. In that space, he kept not only the calendars and the materials for building the calendars but also many other things that he had built himself. One of the major features of the room was a large box that Armstrong kept on his mantelpiece that held the cards that Armstrong would use to help decide what dates to put on the calendars.

His work has been displayed at a number of locations and exhibitions. The first place to display Armstrong's work was a local store called The Corner Cupboard, which in turn led to his work gaining increased notoriety. Armstrong's work has subsequently been featured in several exhibits. Roger Manley used Armstrong's work as an inspiration for and as part of his exhibition The End is Near at the American Visionary Art Museum. A piece of Zebedee Armstrong's entitled "Future Predictor Array" was showcased as part of the Farfetched: Mad Science, Fringe Architecture, and Visionary Engineering exhibition at Gregg Museum of Art and Design in 2013.

== Collections ==
- Art Museum of Southeast Texas, Beaumont, Texas
- Morris Museum of Art, Augusta, Georgia
