= Thomson, Georgia =

- City
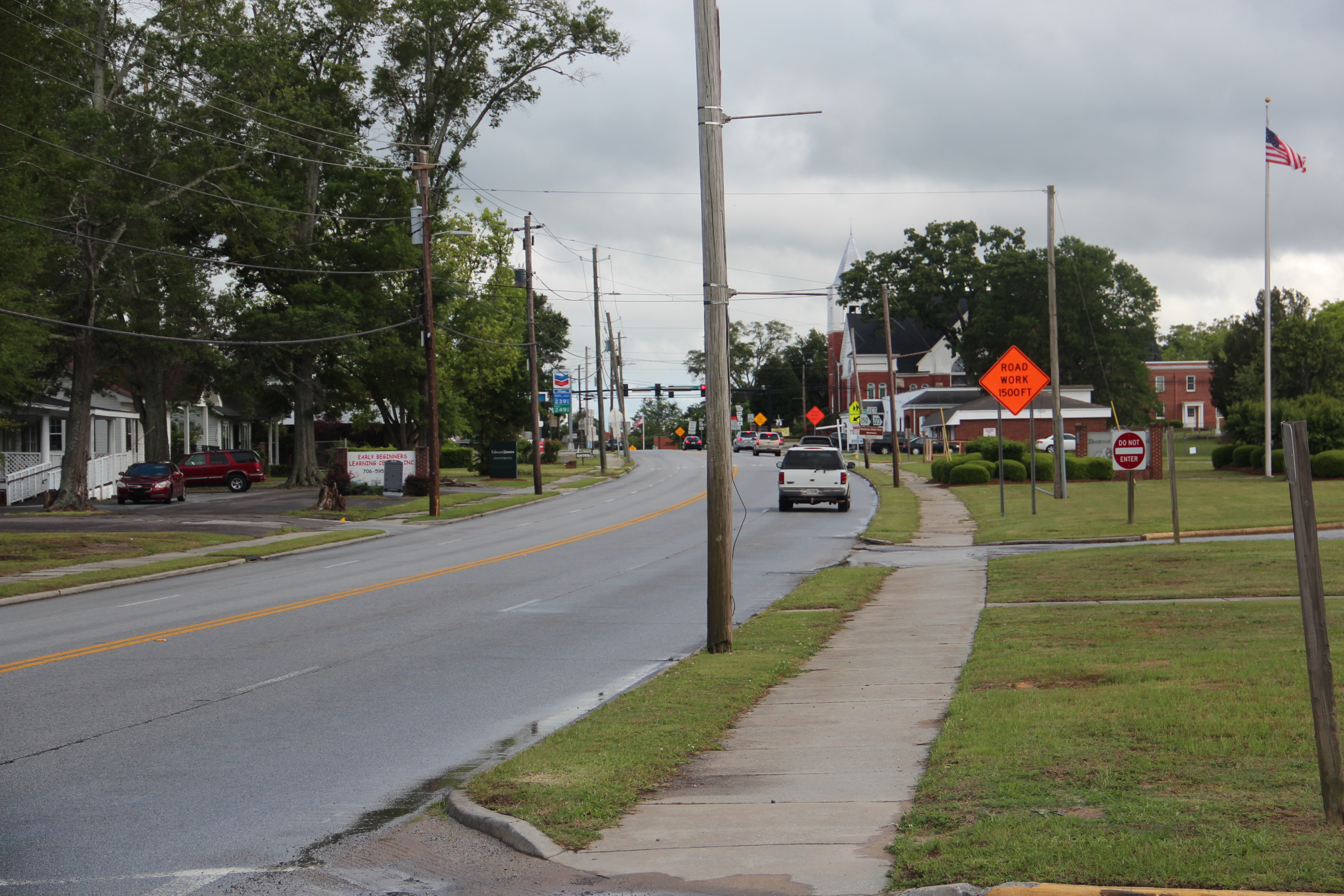
- Main Street in Thomson

- Location in McDuffie County and the state of Georgia
- Coordinates: 33°28′2″N 82°29′58″W
- Country: United States
- State: Georgia
- County: McDuffie

Area
  - Total: 4.80 sq mi (12.42 km^{2})
  - Land: 4.78 sq mi (12.38 km^{2})
  - Water: 0.015 sq mi (0.04 km^{2})
- Elevation: 531 ft (162 m)

Population (2020)
  - Total: 6,814
  - Density: 1,425.6/sq mi (550.43/km^{2})
- Time zone: UTC−5 (Eastern (EST))
  - Summer (DST): UTC−4 (EDT)
- ZIP code: 30824
- Area code: 706
- FIPS code: 13-76280
- GNIS feature ID: 0356589
- Website: www.thomson-mcduffie.gov

Thomson (originally called Slashes) is a city in and the county seat of McDuffie County, Georgia, United States. The population was 6,814 at the 2020 census. Thomson's nickname is "The Camellia City of the South", in honor of the thousands of camellia plants throughout the city. Thomson was founded in 1837 as a depot on the Georgia Railroad. It was renamed in 1853 for railroad official John Edgar Thomson and incorporated February 15, 1854 as a town and in 1870 as a city. It is part of the Augusta – Richmond County Metropolitan Statistical Area.

== History ==
Thomson, originally called "Slashes", was founded in 1837 as a depot on the Georgia Railroad. It was renamed in 1853 for railroad official John Edgar Thomson. In 1870, Thomson was designated seat of the newly formed McDuffie County. It was incorporated as a town in 1854 and as a city in 1870.

The Old Rock House, built in 1785, is said to be one of Georgia's oldest documented houses with its original design intact. Built by Thomas Ansley, the home is said to be the home of ancestors of former president Jimmy Carter. Thomson is also the birthplace of Populist leader and two-time presidential candidate Thomas E. Watson.

Thomson had a minor league baseball team. An affiliate of the Baltimore Orioles, the Thomson Orioles became members of the 1956 six–team the Class D level Georgia State League. Playing home games at The Brickyard, Thomson led the league in attendance and qualified for the playoffs. The Georgia State League permanently folded following the 1956 season.

== Geography ==
Thomson is located at 33°28′2″N 82°29′58″W (33.467346, −82.499450). According to the United States Census Bureau, the city has a total area of 1.95 square miles (5.1 km^{2}), all land. Thomson is considered part of the Central Savannah River Area geographical designation.

== Demographics ==
Historical population
Census	Pop.	Note	%±
1880	700		—
1890	836		19.4%
1900	1,154		38.0%
1910	2,151		86.4%
1920	2,140		−0.5%
1930	1,914		−10.6%
1940	3,088		61.3%
1950	3,489		13.0%
1960	4,522		29.6%
1970	6,503		43.8%
1980	7,001		7.7%
1990	6,862		−2.0%
2000	6,828		−0.5%
2010	6,778		−0.7%
2020	6,814		0.5%
U.S. Decennial Census; 1850-1870 1870-1880; 1890-1910 1920-1930; 1940 1950 1960; 1970 1980 1990; 2000 2010

=== 2020 census ===
As of the 2020 census, Thomson had a population of 6,814. The median age was 38.0 years. 26.9% of residents were under the age of 18 and 18.7% of residents were 65 years of age or older. For every 100 females there were 77.1 males, and for every 100 females age 18 and over there were 70.1 males age 18 and over.

Thomson racial composition as of 2020
Race	Num.	Perc.
White (non-Hispanic)	1,903	27.93%
Black or African American (non-Hispanic)	4,487	65.85%
Native American	6	0.09%
Asian	30	0.44%
Pacific Islander	3	0.04%
Other/Mixed	197	2.89%
Hispanic or Latino	188	2.76%

99.9% of residents lived in urban areas, while 0.1% lived in rural areas.

There were 2,749 households, of which 1,610 were family households, and 33.3% had children under the age of 18 living in them. Of all households, 26.1% were married-couple households, 16.6% were households with a male householder and no spouse or partner present, and 50.6% were households with a female householder and no spouse or partner present. About 33.0% of all households were made up of individuals and 15.7% had someone living alone who was 65 years of age or older.

There were 3,017 housing units, of which 8.9% were vacant. The homeowner vacancy rate was 1.9% and the rental vacancy rate was 5.5%.

== Landmarks ==
- Rock House (1785) – Oldest stone residence in Georgia
- Hickory Hill – Home of US senator Thomas E. Watson (1856–1922), noted author, statesman, and lawyer; known as the father of Rural Free Delivery

== Education ==
The McDuffie County School District holds pre-school to grade twelve, and consists of four elementary schools, a middle school, a high school and an alternative school. The district has 262 full-time teachers and over 4,312 students.

- Dearing Elementary School
- Maxwell Elementary School
- Norris Elementary School
- Thomson Elementary School
- Thomson-McDuffie Middle School
- Thomson High School
- McDuffie County Achievement Center

== Notable people ==
- Zebedee Armstrong, outsider artist
- Casper Brinkley, former defensive end for the NFL's Carolina Panthers
- Jasper Brinkley, linebacker for the NFL's New York Giants
- Vonteego Cummings, former professional basketball guard, played in the NBA and the Euroleague
- Darius Eubanks, linebacker for the NFL'S Dallas Cowboys
- Ray Guy, NFL punter for the Oakland Raiders and namesake of the Ray Guy Award, presented each year to college football's top punter. He is the first and only punter admitted to the Pro Football Hall of Fame.
- Richard E. Hawes, Navy admiral, World War II hero, and namesake of guided missile frigate USS Hawes
- Eddie Lee Ivery, running back for the Georgia Tech Yellow Jackets and the Green Bay Packers
- Millie Jackson, R & B singer
- Franklin Langham, PGA Tour golfer (1992–2005)
- Dr. Wendell Logan, jazz composer and Guggenheim Fellowship recipient. Dr. Logan established the jazz department at the Oberlin Conservatory of Music
- Jerry Mays, running back for the Georgia Tech Yellow Jackets and the San Diego Chargers
- Blind Willie McTell, singer and blues musician, wrote "Statesboro Blues". Thomson sponsors an annual blues festival in his honor
- Chris Mohr, NFL punter for the Tampa Bay Buccaneers, Buffalo Bills and Atlanta Falcons (1989–2004); published songwriter
- Rev. Romulus Moore, one of the first African-American legislators in the Georgia State Assembly, and one of the founding fathers of the civil rights movement.
- Brothers Robert Paschal and James Paschal, notable Atlanta restaurateurs and civil rights advocates
- Ken Roberson, Broadway choreographer noted for his work in the 2004 Tony Award-winning "Avenue Q" and "All Shook Up;" movie credits as choreographer include HBO's "Lackawanna Blues" and independent film "Preaching to the Choir"
- Tom Watson, U.S. senator, Populist Party leader, and renowned orator of the late 19th century. Noted for establishing Rural Free Delivery, which set up rural mail service for the nation
- Alwyn Cashe, the first African-American Medal of Honor recipient post-9/11, and only the second Georgia native to receive the award since 1974.
