= Safety (gridiron football position) =

American and Canadian football defensive position

Safety (S), historically known as a safetyman, is a position in gridiron football on the defense. The safeties are defensive backs who line up ten to fifteen yards from the line of scrimmage. There are two variations of the position: the free safety (FS) and the strong safety (SS). Their duties depend on the defensive scheme. The defensive responsibilities of the safety and cornerback usually involve pass coverage towards the middle and sidelines of the field. While American (11-player) formations generally use two safeties, Canadian (12-player) formations generally have one safety and two defensive halfbacks, a position not used in the American game.

As professional and college football have become more focused on the passing game, safeties have become more involved in covering the eligible pass receivers.

Free safety and strong safety positions in the 3–4 defense

Safeties are the last line of defense, and as such are expected to be reliable tacklers. Many safeties rank among the hardest hitters in football history. Safety positions can also be converted cornerbacks, either by design (Byron Jones) or as a cornerback ages (Rod and Charles Woodson, DeAngelo Hall, Lardarius Webb, Tramon Williams).

Historically, in the era of the one-platoon system, the safety was known as the defensive fullback (specifically the free safety; the strong safety would be a defensive halfback, a term still in Canadian parlance) or goaltender.

== Free safety ==
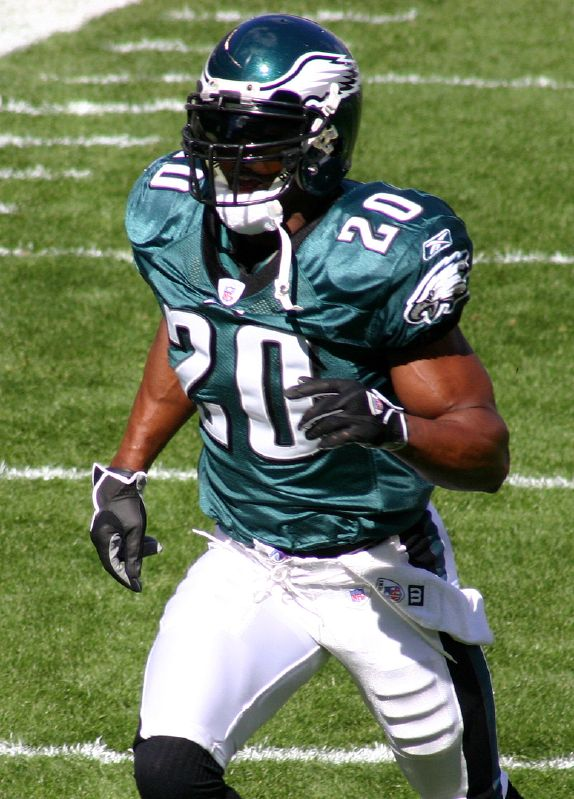
Philadelphia Eagles free safety Brian Dawkins

The free safety tends to watch the play unfold and follow the ball as well as be the "defensive quarterback" of the backfield. The free safety is typically assigned to the quarterback in man coverage, but as the quarterback usually remains in the pocket, the free safety is "free" to cover another player. On pass plays, the free safety is expected to assist the cornerback on his side and to close the distance to the receiver by the time the ball reaches him. If the offense puts a receiver in the slot, then the free safety may be called upon to cover that receiver. Because of their speed and deep coverage, free safeties are especially likely to make interceptions.

Offenses tend to use the play-action pass specifically to make the free safety expect a run play, which would draw him closer to the line of scrimmage, and reduce his effectiveness as a pass defender. Furthermore, quarterbacks often use a technique to "look off" a free safety, by looking away from the intended target receiver's side of the field during a pass play, with the intention to lure the free safety away from that side of the field. This phenomenon often tests how effective a free safety's savvy and athleticism are at defending long pass plays.

Free safeties occasionally blitz as well. When this happens, the pressure on the quarterback can be severe since a blitz by a defensive back is not usually anticipated.

Current examples of free safeties active in the NFL include Minkah Fitzpatrick, Kevin Byard, Jessie Bates, Xavier McKinney, Antoine Winfield Jr., Julian Love, and Jevon Holland.

== Strong safety ==
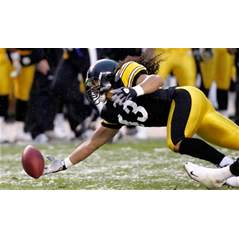
Pittsburgh Steelers strong safety Troy Polamalu making a play on the football

The word strong in strong safety is used because they are assigned to cover the "strong side" of the offense, the side on which the tight end, a typically big, powerful receiver, lines up on offensive plays. Often they are indeed stronger than the free safety, since the player's assignment tends to require more power as opposed to agility.

The strong safety tends to play closer to the line than the free safety does, and assists in stopping the run. They may also cover a player, such as a running back or fullback or H-back, who comes out of the backfield to receive a pass. A strong safety's duties are a hybrid of those belonging to a linebacker in a 46 or 3–4 defense and those of the other defensive backs, in that they both cover the pass and stop the run.

Current examples of strong safeties active in the NFL include Kyle Hamilton, Harrison Smith, Budda Baker, Derwin James, Brian Branch, Talanoa Hufanga, and Tre'von Moehrig. Strong safeties are not seen in the Canadian game; however, the strong side linebacker in Canadian football is assigned similar duties to the American football strong safety. As such, Canadian football strong side linebackers are often players who played strong safety in college or the NFL.
