= Spring Branch, Comal County, Texas =

City in Comal County, Texas, United States

Spring Branch, Texas
- City
- City of Spring Branch
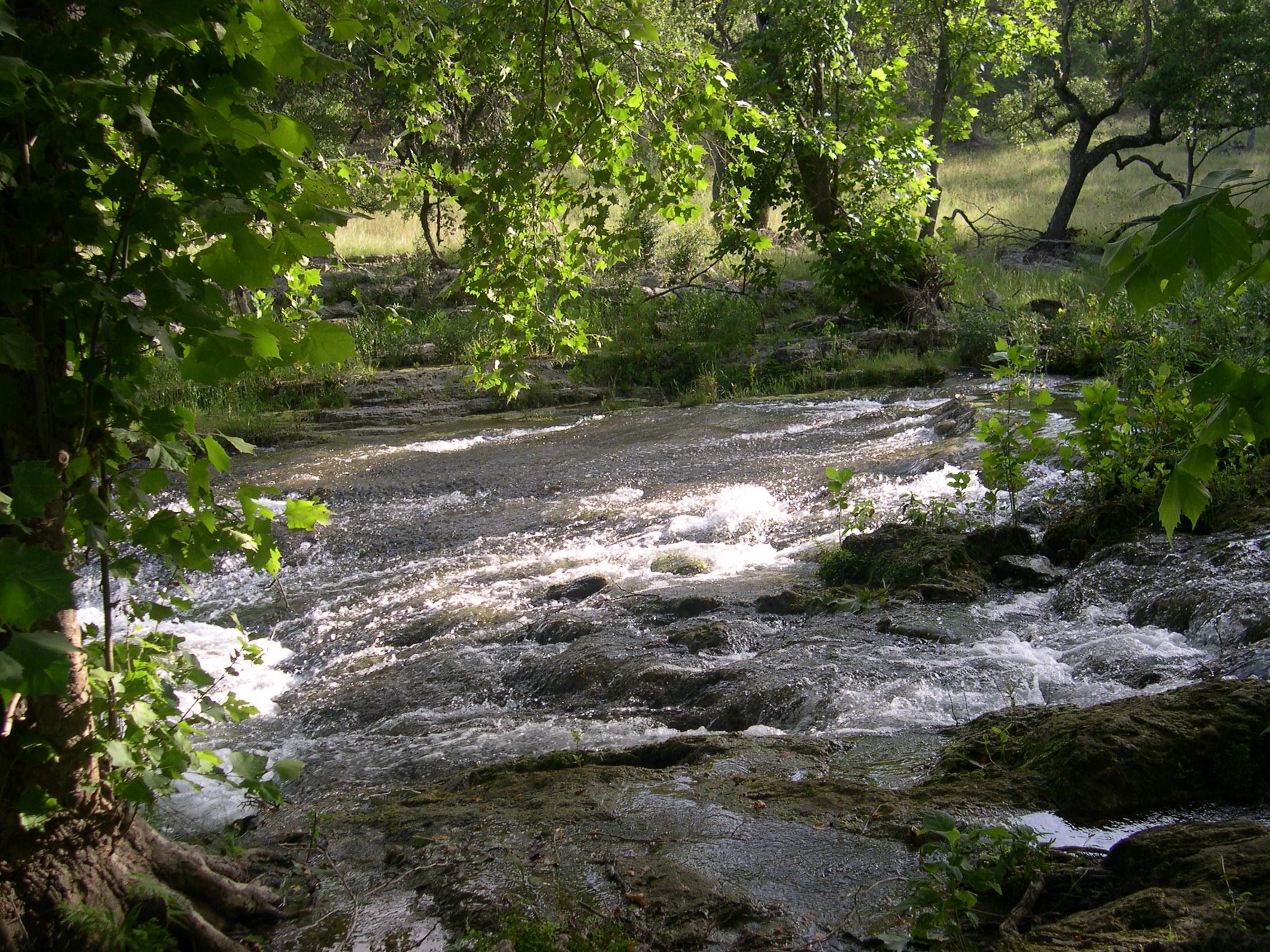
- View of Spring Branch, the city's namesake, in June 2007.

- Location in the state of Texas
- Coordinates: 29°52′43″N 98°24′30″W
- Country: United States
- State: Texas
- County: Comal
- Established: 1852
- Incorporated: November 19, 2015

Government
  - Type: Type C General-Law Municipality
  - Mayor: James Mayer

Area
  - Total: 1.9 sq mi (4.9 km^{2})
- Elevation: 1,129 ft (344 m)

Population (2020)
  - Total: 206
  - Density: 110/sq mi (42/km^{2})
- Time zone: UTC-6 (Central (CST))
  - Summer (DST): UTC-5 (CDT)
- ZIP code: 78070
- Area code: 830
- FIPS code: 48-69608
- GNIS feature ID: 2786576
- Website: cityofspringbranch.gov

Spring Branch is a city in Comal County, Texas, United States. It has approximately 250 residents. The community voted to incorporate in an election held on November 3, 2015 and Spring Branch officially became a city on November 19, 2015.

Originally settled by Germans in the 19th century, Spring Branch is named for a spring fed creek that flows into the Guadalupe River.

== History ==
A significant portion of Spring Branch that borders the Guadalupe River was first settled by German native Adam Becker (1815–1901). Becker journeyed to Texas in 1845 to join Prince Carl of Solms-Braunfels in establishing a colony on behalf of the Adelsverein, also known as the German Emigration Company. Becker contributed to the building of Fredericksburg, Texas, and assisted with other aspects of the colony. He married Elizabeth Monken and by 1852 had established his homestead on what is now Phantom Rider Trail in Spring Branch. On his homestead, he raised cattle. The house he built for his family, which was privately restored in the first decade of the 21st century, was constructed of locally quarried stone and hand-hewn cypress from the banks of the nearby Guadalupe River. Adam Becker became a United States citizen in 1860 and upon his death in 1901 was buried in the cemetery on his homestead.

=== Incorporation ===
The movement to incorporate Spring Branch was initiated over concerns that the area could possibly be annexed into the growing city of Bulverde, which lies to the south. Voters in Bulverde adopted a home rule charter in May 2015 that would allow the city to involuntarily annex bordering properties, including portions of the Spring Branch community. Supporters of the measure also cited local control and preserving the character of the community as further reasons to incorporate. Opponents questioned the economic viability of incorporating a small community with a limited tax base to fund and provide city services. Others expressed the desire to remain unincorporated, but would also prefer having their own city to becoming part of Bulverde.

The petition to place the issue on the ballot was approved by the Comal County Commissioners Court on August 20, 2015. On November 3, 2015, a total of 80 votes were cast, 51 (63.75%) in favor of incorporation and 29 (36.25%) against. Voters also elected a mayor and two commissioners. On November 12, the County Commissioners certified the election results and an official Order of Incorporation was issued by Judge Sherman Krause on November 19.

== Geography ==
Spring Branch is located in western Comal County along U.S. Highway 281, north of Bulverde, west of Canyon Lake and the surrounding unincorporated community of the same name. New Braunfels is approximately 21 miles (34 km) southeast of Spring Branch. The city covers 1.9 square miles, all land.

== Education ==
The Comal Independent School District serves students living in Spring Branch.

== See also ==
- List of municipalities in Texas
