= Bulverde, Texas =

City in Comal County, Texas, U.S.

- City
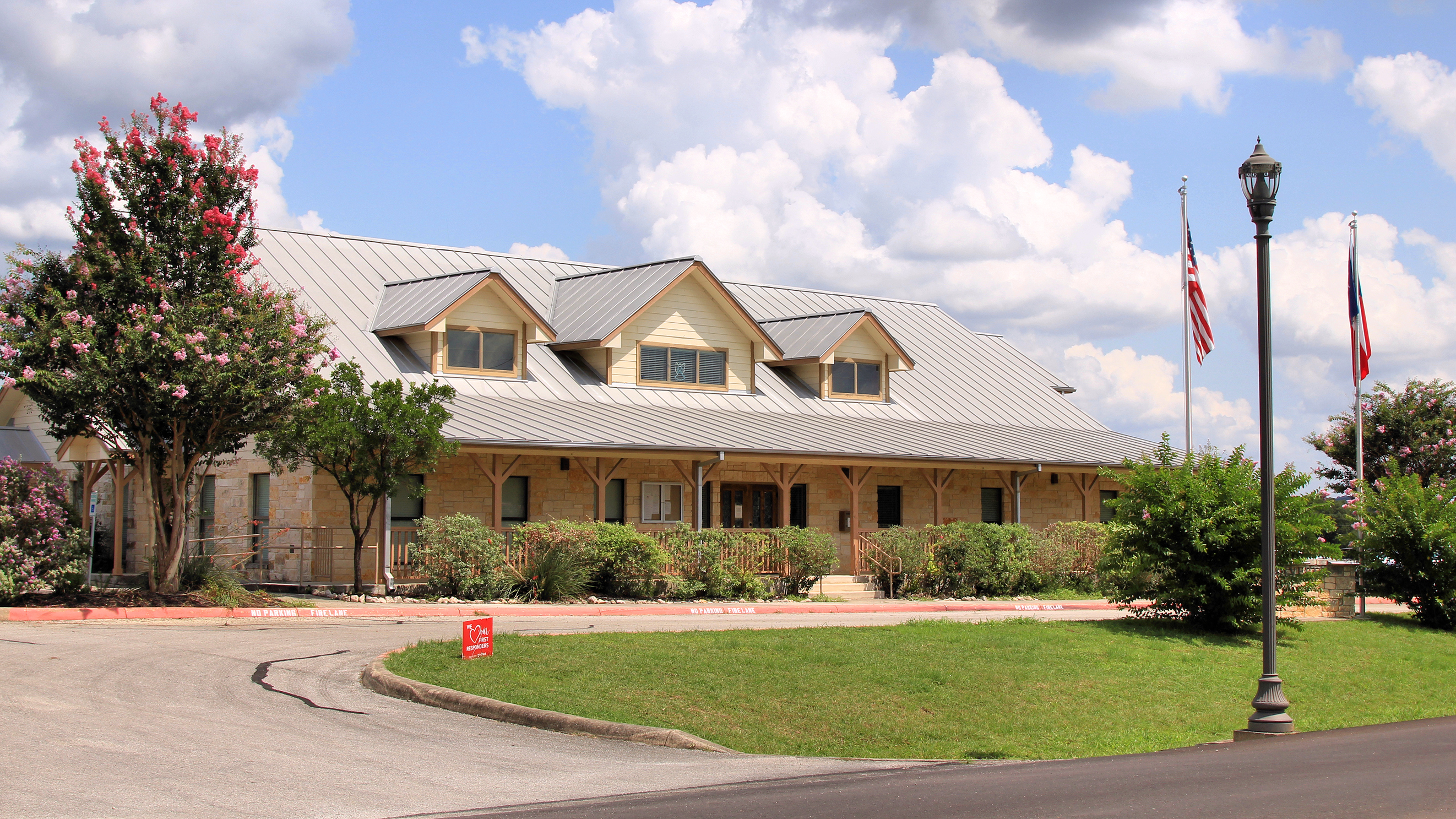
- City Hall
- Motto: "Front Porch of the Texas Hill Country"
- Interactive map of Bulverde, Texas
- Coordinates: 29°46′28″N 98°26′12″W
- Country: United States
- State: Texas
- County: Comal

Area
  - Total: 15.83 sq mi (41.01 km^{2})
  - Land: 15.82 sq mi (40.97 km^{2})
  - Water: 0.015 sq mi (0.04 km^{2})
- Elevation: 1,306 ft (398 m)

Population (2020)
  - Total: 5,692
  - Estimate (2025): 7,337
  - Density: 335.1/sq mi (129.37/km^{2})
- Time zone: UTC-6 (Central (CST))
  - Summer (DST): UTC-5 (CDT)
- ZIP code: 78163
- Area code: 830
- FIPS code: 48-11224
- GNIS feature ID: 2409937
- Website: bulverdetx.gov

Bulverde (/bʊlˈvɜːrdi/ buul-VUR-dee) is a city located in Comal County in the State of Texas. Bulverde is known for the German emigrant history of the town's founders. Bulverde was originally named Piepers Settlement after a prominent German pioneer. Its population was estimated at 7,337 in 2025, up from 5,692 at the 2020 census. Since 2000, Bulverde’s population has grown by over 95 percent. It is part of the San Antonio metropolitan statistical area.

== Geography ==
Located in western Comal County approximately 26 miles (42 km) north of downtown San Antonio. U.S. Route 281 passes through the east side of Bulverde, leading south to San Antonio and north 25 miles (40 km) to Blanco. Cibolo Creek, which forms the Comal County, Texas/Bexar County line, runs just south of Bulverde.

According to the United States Census Bureau, the city has a total area of 9.7 square miles (25.2 km^{2}), of which 0.01 square miles (0.02 km^{2}), or 0.09%, is covered by water.

== Demographics ==
Historical population
Census	Pop.	Note	%±
2000	3,761		—
2010	4,630		23.1%
2020	5,692		22.9%
2025 (est.)	7,337		28.9%
U.S. Decennial Census

=== 2020 census ===
As of the 2020 census, Bulverde had a population of 5,692 people, 2,161 households, and 1,534 families residing in the city.

The median age was 51.0 years. 19.0% of residents were under the age of 18 and 25.4% of residents were 65 years of age or older. For every 100 females there were 95.6 males, and for every 100 females age 18 and over there were 95.2 males age 18 and over.

0% of residents lived in urban areas, while 100.0% lived in rural areas.

There were 2,161 households in Bulverde, of which 28.0% had children under the age of 18 living in them. Of all households, 69.0% were married-couple households, 13.4% were households with a male householder and no spouse or partner present, and 14.7% were households with a female householder and no spouse or partner present. About 18.7% of all households were made up of individuals and 9.4% had someone living alone who was 65 years of age or older.

There were 2,225 housing units, of which 2.9% were vacant. Among occupied housing units, 94.0% were owner-occupied and 6.0% were renter-occupied. The homeowner vacancy rate was 0.9% and the rental vacancy rate was 5.1%.

Bulverde racial composition as of 2020 (NH = Non-Hispanic) (Note: Note: the US Census treats Hispanic/Latino as an ethnic category. This table excludes Latinos from the racial categories and assigns them to a separate category. Hispanics/Latinos can be of any race.)
Race	Number	Percentage
White (NH)	4,045	71.06%
Black or African American (NH)	45	0.79%
Native American or Alaska Native (NH)	16	0.28%
Asian (NH)	43	0.76%
Pacific Islander (NH)	4	0.07%
Some Other Race (NH)	28	0.49%
Mixed/Multi-Racial (NH)	215	3.78%
Hispanic or Latino	1,296	22.77%
Total	5,692	

Racial composition as of the 2020 census
Race	Percent
White	77.5%
Black or African American	0.9%
American Indian and Alaska Native	0.6%
Asian	0.8%
Native Hawaiian and Other Pacific Islander	0.1%
Some other race	3.8%
Two or more races	16.2%
Hispanic or Latino (of any race)	22.8%

=== 2000 census ===
As of the census of 2000, 3,761 people, 1,292 households, and 1,131 families were residing in the city. The population density was 495.7 inhabitants per square mile (191.4/km^{2}). The 1,349 housing units had an average density of 177.8 per square mile (68.6/km^{2}). The racial makeup of the city was 95.32% White, 0.32% African American, 0.32% Native American, 0.51% Asian, 1.81% from other races, and 1.70% from two or more races. Hispanics or Latinos of any race were 10.95% of the population.

Of the 1,292 households, 41.6% had children under 18 living with them, 79.6% were married couples living together, 5.7% had a female householder with no husband present, and 12.4% were not families; 10.1% of all households were made up of individuals, and 3.6% had someone living alone who was 65 or older. The average household size was 2.91 and the average family size was 3.12.

In the city, the age distribution was 28.3% under 18, 5.2% from 18 to 24, 27.7% from 25 to 44, 29.2% from 45 to 64, and 9.6% who were 65 or older. The median age was 40 years. For every 100 females, there were 101.3 males. For every 100 females 18 and over, there were 96.4 males.

The median income for a household in the city was $67,055, and for a family was $68,019. Males had a median income of $49,245 versus $30,717 for females. The per capita income for the city was $26,887. About 1.5% of families and 2.3% of the population were below the poverty line, including none of those under 18 or 65 or over.

== History ==
Bulverde's first people were Native Americans. A type of arrowhead known as the Bulverde Point is named after the style of arrowhead made by Native Americans who lived in the area during the period 2,500 to 600 BCE.

Sometimes called the "Front Porch of the Texas Hill Country", Bulverde was settled in 1850 and called Pieper Settlement after Anton Pieper. It was mainly settled by German immigrants similar to nearby New Braunfels. For many years, the closest post office was at Smithson Valley, and mail was delivered once a week to the house of Carl Koch in Bulverde. A local post office that operated from 1879 to 1919 was named for Luciano Bulverdo, an early area landowner.

Between 1996 and 1999, five separate municipalities were incorporated and combined in the Bulverde area to form the current City of Bulverde. This process required 22 separate elections. In May 2015, the people of Bulverde voted to adopt a home-rule charter to have more control over development.

== Education ==
Bulverde is served by the Comal Independent School District.

Throughout the 1980s and as of 2021, the children of Bulverde fed into Smithson Valley High School. The sports teams from the high school regularly advanced to compete at state championship levels.

Zoned schools:

- Rahe Bulverde, Johnson Ranch, Arlon Seay, and Bill Brown elementary schools
- Most residents are in the Spring Branch Middle School zone, while some are in the Smithson Valley middle zone
- Smithson Valley High School

Private schools in the city include Living Rock Academy and Bracken Christian School.

== Notable people ==
- Donald H. Balch, a United States Air Force general, died here in 2007.
- Felix "Doc" Blanchard ("Mr. Inside"), 1945 Heisman Trophy winner, died on April 19, 2009, in Bulverde.
- Scott Casey, WCCW pro wrestler
- Taylor Hagler, racing driver
- Jason LaRue, Major League Baseball catcher for three teams over twelve seasons
- Augie Meyers, musician and singer, former member of Sir Douglas Quintet, and Texas Tornados

== Climate ==
The climate in this area is characterized by hot, humid summers and generally mild to cool winters. According to the Köppen climate classification, Bulverde has a humid subtropical climate, Cfa on climate maps.
