= 2012 Minnesota Vikings season =

52nd season in franchise history

- Owner: Zygi Wilf
- Head coach: Leslie Frazier
- Offensive coordinator: Bill Musgrave
- Defensive coordinator: Alan Williams
- Home stadium: Mall of America Field at Hubert H. Humphrey Metrodome

Results
- Record: 10–6
- Division place: 2nd NFC North
- Playoffs: Lost Wild Card Playoffs (at Packers) 10–24
- All-Pros: 4: RB Adrian Peterson (1st team); FB Jerome Felton (2nd team); LB Chad Greenway (2nd team); K Blair Walsh (1st team)
- Pro Bowlers: 7: RB Adrian Peterson; FB Jerome Felton; DE Jared Allen (bench); K Blair Walsh; LB Chad Greenway (replacement); TE Kyle Rudolph (replacement); OT Matt Kalil (replacement)
- Team MVP: Adrian Peterson

Uniform
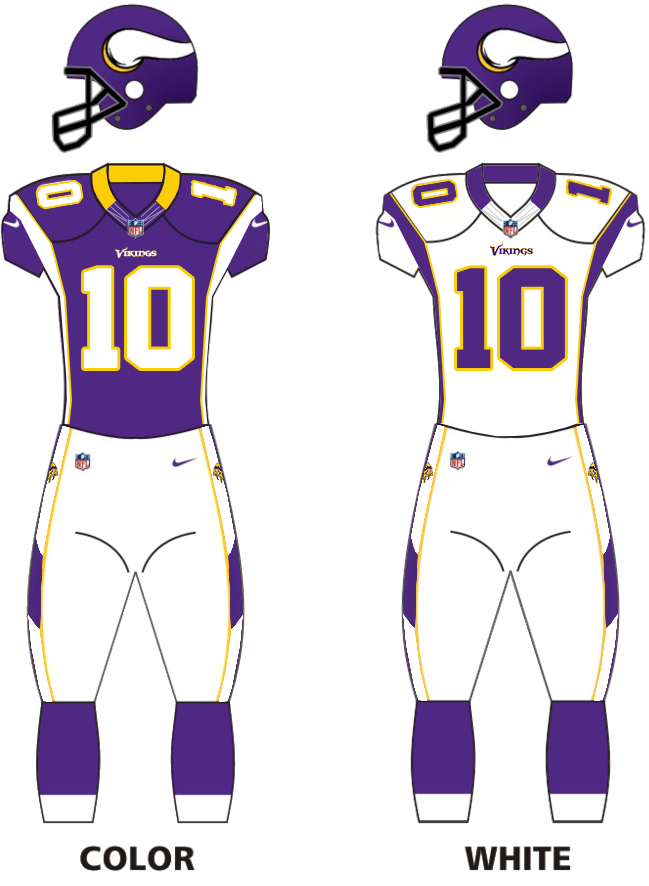

The 2012 season was the Minnesota Vikings' 52nd in the National Football League (NFL), as well as their second full season under head coach Leslie Frazier. They looked to improve upon their 3–13 season the year before, and did so after defeating the Tennessee Titans in Week 5; their win over the Houston Texans in Week 16 made this their first winning season since 2009. The Vikings also made the playoffs for the first time since 2009 with a Week 17 win over the Green Bay Packers to give them a 10–6 regular season record, but were defeated by the same opponents in the Wild Card playoff round the following week. Adrian Peterson was named the league's Most Valuable Player after rushing for 2,097 yards, just nine yards short of breaking the single-season record held by Eric Dickerson since 1984.

On May 10, 2012, the Minnesota State Legislature approved a bill for a new stadium for the team that would see a new facility (later named U.S. Bank Stadium) constructed by 2016 and ensure the Vikings' presence in Minneapolis through the year 2046. The bill was signed by Governor Mark Dayton on May 14, and approved by the Minneapolis City Council by a vote of 7–6 on May 25.

== Offseason ==
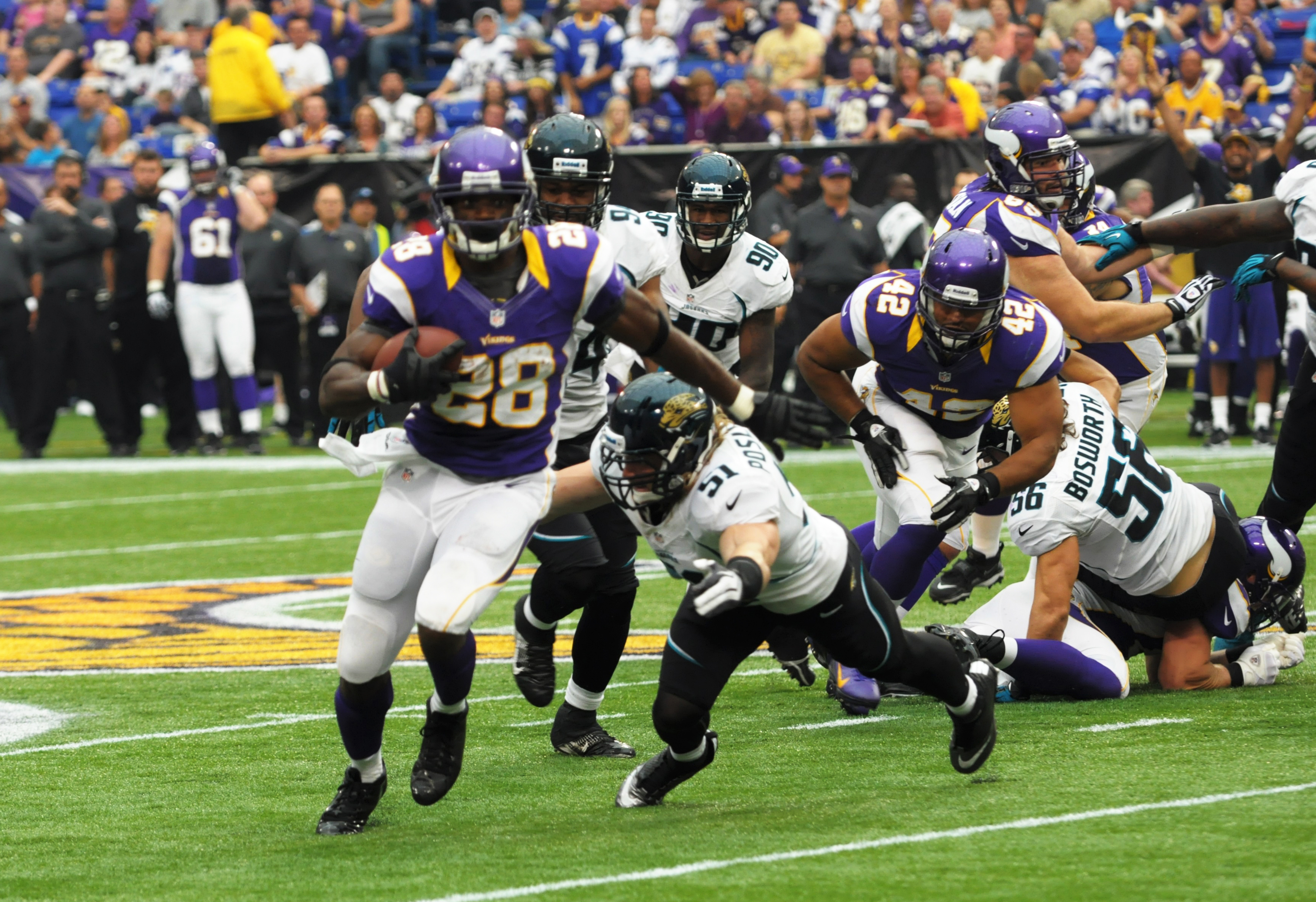
Adrian Peterson rushed to a new career franchise record against Jacksonville in week 1, overtaking Robert Smith's 6,818 rushing yards

=== Pre-draft transactions ===
The first major transactions of the 2012 offseason were the releases of veteran guards Steve Hutchinson and Anthony Herrera, and CB Cedric Griffin on March 10, as the Vikings began rebuilding their offensive line and secondary. Three days later, the team re-signed perennial backup QB Sage Rosenfels and DT Letroy Guion off their unrestricted free agents list. This was followed up with the signing of the Seattle Seahawks' unrestricted free agent TE John Carlson on a five-year contract.

The next week, the team brought in FB Jerome Felton, also an unrestricted free agent, from the Indianapolis Colts. They then released DT Remi Ayodele on March 21, but re-signed DT Fred Evans. March 26 was a big day for signings by the Vikings, with the re-signings of WR Devin Aromashodu and LB Erin Henderson, as well as the free agent acquisitions of CB Zack Bowman from the Chicago Bears and T Geoff Schwartz from the Carolina Panthers.

April saw very few transactions go through in anticipation of the 2012 NFL draft at the end of the month. Nevertheless, the Vikings signed LB Marvin Mitchell and WR Jerome Simpson, despite the fact that Simpson would miss the first three games of the season for a violation of the NFL's substance abuse policy.

=== 2012 draft ===
Pro Bowler

2012 Minnesota Vikings Draft
Draft order		Player name	Position	College	Contract	Notes
Round	Overall	Player name	Position	College	Contract	Notes
1	3	Traded to the Cleveland Browns (Note: The Vikings traded their first-round selection (3rd overall) to the Browns in exchange for first-, fourth-, fifth- and seventh-round selections (4th, 118th, 139th and 211th overall).)				
1	4	Matt Kalil	OT	USC	4 years	From Browns
1	29	Harrison Smith	S	Notre Dame	4 years	From Ravens (Note: The Vikings traded their second- and fourth-round selections (35th and 98th overall) to the Ravens in exchange for a first-round selection (29th overall).)
2	35	Traded to the Baltimore Ravens				
3	66	Josh Robinson	CB	UCF	4 years	
4	98	Traded to the Baltimore Ravens				
4	118	Jarius Wright	WR	Arkansas	4 years	From Falcons, via Browns
4	128	Rhett Ellison	FB	USC	4 years	Compensatory pick (Note: The Vikings were awarded two compensatory picks for the loss of free agents DE Ray Edwards, LB Ben Leber, QB Tarvaris Jackson and WR Sidney Rice.)
4	134	Greg Childs	WR	Arkansas	4 years	Compensatory pick
5	138	Traded to the Detroit Lions (Note: The Vikings traded their fifth- and seventh-round selections (138th and 223rd overall) to the Lions in exchange for a seventh-round selection (219th overall) a 2013 fourth-round selection (102nd overall).)				
5	139	Robert Blanton	S	Notre Dame	4 years	From Browns
6	173	Traded to the Washington Redskins (Note: The Vikings traded their sixth-round selection (173rd overall) to the Redskins in exchange for QB Donovan McNabb.)				
6	175	Blair Walsh	K	Georgia	4 years	From Browns (Note: The Vikings traded DE Jayme Mitchell to the Browns in exchange for a sixth-round selection (175th overall).)
7	210	Audie Cole	LB	NC State	4 years	
7	211	Traded to the Tennessee Titans (Note: The Vikings traded their seventh-round selection (211th overall) to the Titans in exchange for a 2013 sixth-round selection (176th overall).)				From Browns
7	219	Trevor Guyton	DE	California	4 years	From Seahawks, via Lions
7	223	Traded to the Detroit Lions				From Eagles, via Patriots (Note: The Vikings traded a 2011 third-round selection (74th overall) to the Patriots in exchange for WR Randy Moss and a seventh-round selection (223rd overall).)

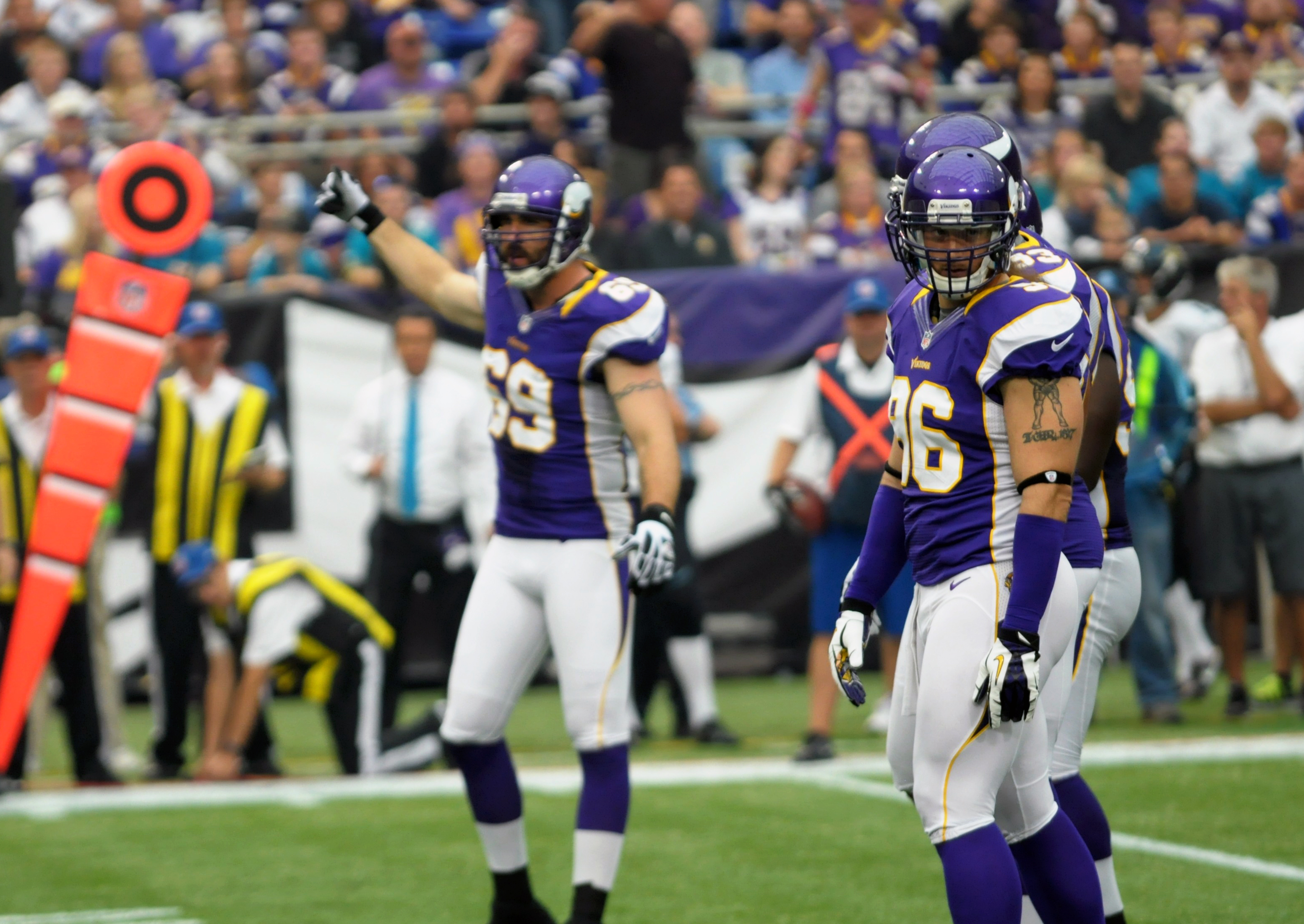
DE Brian Robison and the Vikings defense against the Jacksonville Jaguars, September 9

=== Post-draft transactions ===
With the 2012 Draft over, the Vikings resumed their transactions in May, signing a number of undrafted free agents to their roster, and releasing RB Caleb King, following a short jail term. With the drafting of Blair Walsh, veteran kicker Ryan Longwell found himself surplus to requirements for the Vikings and he was released on May 7. By the start of June, all of the Vikings draft selections (with the exception of T Matt Kalil) had been signed to long-term contracts.

== Staff ==
2012 Minnesota Vikings staff
Front office: Owner/chairman – Zygi Wilf; Owner/president – Mark Wilf; Owner/vice chairman – Leonard Wilf; General manager – Rick Spielman; Vice president of football operations – Rob Brzezinski; Assistant general manager – George Paton; Director of college scouting – Scott Studwell; Assistant director of college scouting – Jamaal Stephenson; Head coaches: Head coach – Leslie Frazier; Special assistant to the head coach/linebackers – Mike Singletary; Assistant to the head coach – Cameron Turner; Offensive coaches: Offensive coordinator – Bill Musgrave; Quarterbacks – Craig Johnson; Assistant quarterbacks – Kevin Stefanski; Running backs – James Saxon; Wide receivers – George Stewart; Assistant wide receivers – Ryan Ficken; Tight ends – Jimmie Johnson; Offensive line – Jeff Davidson; Assistant offensive line – Ryan Silverfield	Defensive coaches: Defensive coordinator – Alan Williams; Defensive line – Brendan Daly; Assistant defensive line – Diron Reynolds; Linebackers – Fred Pagac; Defensive backs/secondary – Joe Woods; Defensive assistant – Jeff Imamura; Special teams coaches: Special teams coordinator – Mike Priefer; Assistant special teams – Chris White; Strength and conditioning: Head athletic trainer/director of sports medicine – Eric Sugarman; Strength and conditioning – Tom Kanavy; Assistant strength and conditioning – Martin Streight; Assistant strength and conditioning – Aaron McLaurin

== Roster ==
2012 Minnesota Vikings roster
Quarterbacks (QB): 4 McLeod Bethel-Thompson; 7 Christian Ponder; 14 Joe Webb; Running backs (RB): 48 Matt Asiata; 42 Jerome Felton FB; 32 Toby Gerhart; 28 Adrian Peterson; Wide receivers (WR): 19 Devin Aromashodu; 11 Stephen Burton; 84 Michael Jenkins; 81 Jerome Simpson; 17 Jarius Wright; Tight ends (TE): 89 John Carlson; 40 Rhett Ellison; 82 Kyle Rudolph	Offensive linemen (OL): 61 Joe Berger C/G; 63 Brandon Fusco G; 74 Charlie Johnson G; 75 Matt Kalil T; 78 Troy Kropog T; 71 Phil Loadholt T; 76 Geoff Schwartz G/T; 65 John Sullivan C; Defensive linemen (DL): 69 Jared Allen DE; 99 Christian Ballard DT; 90 Fred Evans DT; 97 Everson Griffen DE; 98 Letroy Guion DT; 92 George Johnson DE; 91 D'Aundre Reed DE; 96 Brian Robison DE; 93 Kevin Williams DT	Linebackers (LB): 54 Jasper Brinkley MLB; 57 Audie Cole MLB; 51 Larry Dean OLB; 52 Chad Greenway OLB; 50 Erin Henderson OLB; 58 Tyrone McKenzie MLB; 55 Marvin Mitchell OLB; Defensive backs (DB): 36 Robert Blanton SS; 27 Brandon Burton CB; 20 Chris Cook CB; 24 A. J. Jefferson CB; 41 Mistral Raymond SS; 21 Josh Robinson CB; 33 Jamarca Sanford SS; 34 Andrew Sendejo FS; 35 Marcus Sherels; 22 Harrison Smith FS; 26 Antoine Winfield CB; Special teams (ST): 5 Chris Kluwe P; 46 Cullen Loeffler LS; 3 Blair Walsh K	Practice squad: 62 Chase Baker DT; 23 Joe Banyard RB; 87 LaMark Brown WR; 31 Bobby Felder CB; 89 Chase Ford TE; 66 Tyler Holmes G; 68 Kevin Murphy T; 15 Chris Summers WR; Reserve: 85 Greg Childs WR (IR); 12 Percy Harvin WR (IR); 73 DeMarcus Love T (IR); 39 Nick Taylor CB (IR); Rookies in italics 53 active, 4 reserve, 8 practice squad

== Preseason ==
=== Schedule ===
This was the first year the Vikings used a TV/radio simulcast for their preseason games.

Week	Date	Opponent	Result	Record	Venue	NFL.com recap
1	August 10	at San Francisco 49ers	L 6–17	0–1	Candlestick Park	Recap
2	August 17	Buffalo Bills	W 36–14	1–1	Mall of America Field	Recap
3	August 24	San Diego Chargers	L 10–12	1–2	Mall of America Field	Recap
4	August 30	at Houston Texans	L 24–28	1–3	Reliant Stadium	Recap

=== Game summaries ===
==== Week 1: at San Francisco 49ers ====
Preseason Week 1: Minnesota Vikings at San Francisco 49ers – Game summary

Quarter	1	2	3	4	Total
Vikings	3	3	0	0	6
49ers	7	10	0	0	17

at Candlestick Park, San Francisco, California

- Date: August 10
- Game time: 8:00 p.m.
- Game weather: Sunny, 60 °F (16 °C)
- Game attendance: 69,732
- Referee: Jim Core ()
- TV announcers (WUCW-23): Paul Allen, Pete Bercich, Greg Coleman and Ben Leber
- Recap, Game Book

Game information

First quarter

- MIN – Blair Walsh 39-yard field goal, 12:34. Vikings 3–0. Drive: 6 plays, 59 yards, 2:26.
- SF – Brett Swain 4-yard pass from Alex Smith (Giorgio Tavecchio kick), 5:13. 49ers 7–3. Drive: 12 plays, 84 yards, 7:21.

Second quarter

- MIN – Blair Walsh 26-yard field goal, 14:06. 49ers 7–6. Drive: 13 plays, 68 yards, 6:07.
- SF – Colin Kaepernick 78-yard run (Giorgio Tavecchio kick), 13:38. 49ers 14–6. Drive: 2 plays, 80 yards, 0:28.
- SF – Giorgio Tavecchio 29-yard field goal, 1:56. 49ers 17–6. Drive: 12 plays, 47 yards, 6:29.

Third quarter

- No scoring plays.

Fourth quarter

- No scoring plays.

Passing

- MIN – Christian Ponder – 4/9, 80 yards
- SF – Scott Tolzien – 10/13, 84 yards

Rushing

- MIN – Toby Gerhart – 5 rushes, 31 yards
- SF – Colin Kaepernick – 3 rushes, 92 yards, TD

Receiving

- MIN – Stephen Burton – 1 reception, 52 yards
- SF – Chris Owusu – 3 receptions, 35 yards

==== Week 2: vs. Buffalo Bills ====
Preseason Week 2: Buffalo Bills at Minnesota Vikings – Game summary

Quarter	1	2	3	4	Total
Bills	0	7	7	0	14
Vikings	10	6	3	17	36

at Mall of America Field at Hubert H. Humphrey Metrodome, Minneapolis, Minnesota

- Date: August 17
- Game time: 7:00 p.m.
- Game weather: None (domed stadium)
- Game attendance: 56,430
- Referee: Robert Frazer (36)
- TV announcers (KARE-11): Paul Allen, Pete Bercich, Greg Coleman and Ben Leber
- Recap, Game Book

Game information

First quarter

- MIN – Jerome Felton 1-yard pass from Christian Ponder (Blair Walsh kick), 11:04. Vikings 7–0. Drive: 8 plays, 80 yards, 3:56.
- MIN – Blair Walsh 22-yard field goal, 1:39. Vikings 10–0. Drive: 13 plays, 50 yards, 6:20.

Second quarter

- BUF – Donald Jones 31-yard pass from Ryan Fitzpatrick (Rian Lindell kick), 8:51. Vikings 10–7. Drive: 5 plays, 61 yards, 3:13.
- MIN – Blair Walsh 47-yard field goal, 5:40. Vikings 13–7. Drive: 7 plays, 51 yards, 3:11.
- MIN – Blair Walsh 45-yard field goal, 0:27. Vikings 16–7. Drive: 5 plays, 23 yards, 0:30.

Third quarter

- BUF – Tashard Choice 1-yard run (Rian Lindell kick), 13:25. Vikings 16–14. Drive: 4 plays, 80 yards, 1:35.
- MIN – Blair Walsh 40-yard field goal, 4:49. Vikings 19–14. Drive: 12 plays, 64 yards, 6:07.

Fourth quarter

- MIN – Blair Walsh 30-yard field goal, 3:37. Vikings 22–14. Drive: 7 plays, 62 yards, 2:55.
- MIN – Audie Cole 20-yard interception return (Blair Walsh kick), 3:18. Vikings 29–14.
- MIN – Audie Cole 30-yard interception return (Blair Walsh kick), 3:05. Vikings 36–14.

Passing

- BUF – Vince Young – 8/14, 123 yards
- MIN – Christian Ponder – 10/13, 136 yards, TD

Rushing

- BUF – Fred Jackson – 5 rushes, 27 yards
- MIN – Joe Webb – 2 rushes, 64 yards

Receiving

- BUF – T. J. Graham – 2 receptions, 69 yards
- MIN – Emmanuel Arceneaux – 2 receptions, 50 yards

==== Week 3: vs. San Diego Chargers ====
Preseason Week 3: San Diego Chargers at Minnesota Vikings – Game summary

Quarter	1	2	3	4	Total
Chargers	3	3	0	6	12
Vikings	0	3	0	7	10

at Mall of America Field at Hubert H. Humphrey Metrodome, Minneapolis, Minnesota

- Date: August 24
- Game time: 7:00 p.m.
- Game weather: None (domed stadium)
- Game attendance: 62,800
- Referee: Wayne Elliott (28)
- TV announcers (KARE-11): Paul Allen, Pete Bercich, Greg Coleman and Ben Leber
- Recap, Game Book

Game information

First quarter

- SD – Nate Kaeding 50-yard field goal, 4:55. Chargers 3–0. Drive: 13 plays, 37 yards, 6:49.

Second quarter

- SD – Nick Novak 34-yard field goal, 10:23. Chargers 6–0. Drive: 7 plays, 15 yards, 2:10.
- MIN – Blair Walsh 29-yard field goal, 0:08. Chargers 6–3. Drive: 5 plays, 17 yards, 1:17.

Third quarter

- No scoring plays.

Fourth quarter

- SD – Nate Kaeding 54-yard field goal, 8:40. Chargers 9–3. Drive: 7 plays, 46 yards, 3:26.
- MIN – Matt Asiata 1-yard pass from Sage Rosenfels (Blair Walsh kick), 1:50. Vikings 10–9. Drive: 10 plays, 62 yards, 4:14.
- SD – Nick Novak 45-yard field goal, 0:00. Chargers 12–10. Drive: 9 plays, 53 yards, 1:50.

Passing

- SD – Charlie Whitehurst – 8/18, 80 yards
- MIN – Christian Ponder – 9/16, 115 yards

Rushing

- SD – Edwin Baker – 13 rushes, 35 yards
- MIN – Matt Asiata – 9 rushes, 48 yards

Receiving

- SD – Micheal Spurlock – 3 receptions, 46 yards
- MIN – Percy Harvin – 2 receptions, 53 yards

==== Week 4: at Houston Texans ====
Preseason Week 4: Minnesota Vikings at Houston Texans – Game summary

Quarter	1	2	3	4	Total
Vikings	0	10	14	0	24
Texans	7	7	14	0	28

at Reliant Stadium, Houston, Texas

- Date: August 30
- Game time: 6:00 p.m.
- Game weather: Fair, 71 °F (22 °C)
- Game attendance: 71,116
- Referee: Donovan Briggans (12)
- TV announcers (KARE-11): Paul Allen, Pete Bercich, Greg Coleman and Ben Leber
- Recap, Game Book

Game information

First quarter

- HOU – Justin Forsett 3-yard run (Shayne Graham kick), 12:01. Texans 7–0. Drive: 6 plays, 83 yards, 2:59.

Second quarter

- MIN – Blair Walsh 36-yard field goal, 14:11. Texans 7–3. Drive: 14 plays, 64 yards, 7:24.
- HOU – DeVier Posey 80-yard pass from John Beck (Shayne Graham kick), 4:21. Texans 14–3. Drive: 1 play, 80 yards, 0:20.
- MIN – Devin Aromashodu 58-yard pass from Sage Rosenfels (Blair Walsh kick), 0:33. Texans 14–10. Drive: 4 plays, 89 yards, 0:47.

Third quarter

- HOU – Trindon Holliday 76-yard punt return (Shayne Graham kick), 13:26. Texans 21–10.
- MIN – Jarius Wright 59-yard pass from McLeod Bethel-Thompson (Blair Walsh kick), 11:22. Texans 21–17. Drive: 4 plays, 80 yards, 2:04.
- HOU – Justin Forsett 5-yard run (Shayne Graham kick), 7:27. Texans 28–17. Drive: 5 plays, 32 yards, 2:25.
- MIN – Jordan Todman 76-yard run (Blair Walsh kick), 6:55. Texans 28–24. Drive: 2 plays, 76 yards, 0:32.

Fourth quarter

- No scoring plays.

Passing

- MIN – McLeod Bethel-Thompson – 15/29, 193 yards, TD
- HOU – John Beck – 6/10, 149 yards, TD

Rushing

- MIN – Jordan Todman – 10 rushes, 114 yards, TD
- HOU – Justin Forsett – 13 rushes, 114 yards, 2 TD

Receiving

- MIN – Jarius Wright – 6 receptions, 122 yards, TD
- HOU – DeVier Posey – 2 receptions, 93 yards, TD

== Regular season ==
=== Schedule ===
Week	Date	Opponent	Result	Record	Venue	NFL.com recap
1	September 9	**Jacksonville Jaguars**	**W** 26–23 (OT)	1–0	Mall of America Field	Recap
2	September 16	at Indianapolis Colts	**L** 20–23	1–1	Lucas Oil Stadium	Recap
3	September 23	**San Francisco 49ers**	**W** 24–13	2–1	Mall of America Field	Recap
4	September 30	at Detroit Lions	**W** 20–13	3–1	Ford Field	Recap
5	October 7	**Tennessee Titans**	**W** 30–7	4–1	Mall of America Field	Recap
6	October 14	at Washington Redskins	**L** 26–38	4–2	FedExField	Recap
7	October 21	**Arizona Cardinals**	**W** 21–14	5–2	Mall of America Field	Recap
8	October 25	**Tampa Bay Buccaneers**	**L** 17–36	5–3	Mall of America Field	Recap
9	November 4	at Seattle Seahawks	**L** 20–30	5–4	CenturyLink Field	Recap
10	November 11	**Detroit Lions**	**W** 34–24	6–4	Mall of America Field	Recap
11	Bye					
12	November 25	at Chicago Bears	**L** 10–28	6–5	Soldier Field	Recap
13	December 2	at Green Bay Packers	**L** 14–23	6–6	Lambeau Field	Recap
14	December 9	**Chicago Bears**	**W** 21–14	7–6	Mall of America Field	Recap
15	December 16	at St. Louis Rams	**W** 36–22	8–6	Edward Jones Dome	Recap
16	December 23	at Houston Texans	**W** 23–6	9–6	Reliant Stadium	Recap
17	December 30	**Green Bay Packers**	**W** 37–34	10–6	Mall of America Field	Recap

Team names in bold indicate Vikings' home games.

=== Game summaries ===
==== Week 1: vs. Jacksonville Jaguars ====
Week 1: Jacksonville Jaguars at Minnesota Vikings – Game summary

Quarter	1	2	3	4	OT	Total
Jaguars	3	6	3	11	0	**23**
**Vikings**	0	7	7	9	3	**26**

at Mall of America Field at Hubert H. Humphrey Metrodome, Minneapolis, Minnesota

- Date: September 9
- Game time: 12:00 p.m. CDT
- Game weather: None (domed stadium)
- Game attendance: 56,607
- Referee: Robert Dalton (22)
- TV announcers (CBS): Kevin Harlan and Solomon Wilcots
- Recap, Game Book

Game information

**First quarter**

- JAC – Josh Scobee 19-yard field goal, 2:52. Jaguars 3–0. **Drive: 17 plays, 77 yards, 9:22.**

**Second quarter**

- JAC – Marcedes Lewis 1-yard pass from Blaine Gabbert (kick blocked), 5:21. Jaguars 9–0. **Drive: 11 plays, 78 yards, 7:09.**
- MIN – Adrian Peterson 3-yard run (Blair Walsh kick), 0:41. Jaguars 9–7. **Drive: 7 plays, 59 yards, 1:47.**

**Third quarter**

- MIN – Adrian Peterson 2-yard run (Blair Walsh kick), 9:42. Vikings 14–9. **Drive: 4 plays, 44 yards, 1:54.**
- JAC – Josh Scobee 26-yard field goal, 4:40. Vikings 14–12. **Drive: 4 plays, 8 yards, 1:25.**

**Fourth quarter**

- MIN – Blair Walsh 20-yard field goal, 14:09. Vikings 17–12. **Drive: 11 plays, 75 yards, 5:31.**
- JAC – Josh Scobee 47-yard field goal, 9:35. Vikings 17–15. **Drive: 10 plays, 51 yards, 4:34.**
- MIN – Blair Walsh 42-yard field goal, 5:33. Vikings 20–15. **Drive: 9 plays, 57 yards, 4:02.**
- JAC – Cecil Shorts 39-yard pass from Blaine Gabbert (Blaine Gabbert pass to Justin Blackmon), 0:20. Jaguars 23–20. **Drive: 6 plays, 76 yards, 0:58.**
- MIN – Blair Walsh 55-yard field goal, 0:00. Tied 23–23. **Drive: 3 plays, 32 yards, 0:20.**

**Overtime**

- MIN – Blair Walsh 38-yard field goal, 11:06. Vikings 26–23. **Drive: 8 plays, 55 yards, 3:54.**

**Top passers**

- JAC – Blaine Gabbert – 23/39, 260 yards, 2 TD
- MIN – Christian Ponder – 20/27, 270 yards

**Top rushers**

- JAC – Maurice Jones-Drew – 19 rushes, 77 yards
- MIN – Adrian Peterson – 17 rushes, 84 yards, 2 TD

**Top receivers**

- JAC – Cecil Shorts – 4 receptions, 74 yards, TD
- MIN – Percy Harvin – 6 receptions, 84 yards

==== Week 2: at Indianapolis Colts ====
Week 2: Minnesota Vikings at Indianapolis Colts – Game summary

Quarter	1	2	3	4	Total
Vikings	3	3	0	14	**20**
**Colts**	7	10	3	3	**23**

at Lucas Oil Stadium, Indianapolis, Indiana

- Date: September 16
- Game time: 1:00 p.m. EDT/12:00 p.m. CDT
- Game weather: Sunny, 72 °F (22 °C)
- Game attendance: 63,912
- Referee: Donald King (60)
- TV announcers (Fox): Thom Brennaman, Brian Billick and Laura Okmin
- Recap, Game Book

Game information

**First quarter**

- MIN – Blair Walsh 51-yard field goal, 7:48. Vikings 3–0. **Drive: 12 plays, 44 yards, 7:12.**
- IND – Dwayne Allen 3-yard pass from Andrew Luck (Adam Vinatieri kick), 0:49. Colts 7–3. **Drive: 13 plays, 80 yards, 6:59.**

**Second quarter**

- MIN – Blair Walsh 29-yard field goal, 11:38. Colts 7–6. **Drive: 9 plays, 46 yards, 4:11.**
- IND – Adam Vinatieri 26-yard field goal, 1:49. Colts 10–6. **Drive: 9 plays, 40 yards, 4:13.**
- IND – Reggie Wayne 30-yard pass from Andrew Luck (Adam Vinatieri kick), 0:07. Colts 17–6. **Drive: 8 plays, 64 yards, 1:04.**

**Third quarter**

- IND – Adam Vinatieri 45-yard field goal, 7:06. Colts 20–6. **Drive: 14 plays, 53 yards, 7:54.**

**Fourth quarter**

- MIN – Stephen Burton 7-yard pass from Christian Ponder (Blair Walsh kick), 5:07. Colts 20–13. **Drive: 10 plays, 54 yards, 5:03.**
- MIN – Kyle Rudolph 6-yard pass from Christian Ponder (Blair Walsh kick), 0:31. Tied 20–20. **Drive: 9 plays, 47 yards, 2:19.**
- IND – Adam Vinatieri 53-yard field goal, 0:08. Colts 23–20. **Drive: 4 plays, 45 yards, 0:23.**

**Top passers**

- MIN – Christian Ponder – 27/35, 245 yards, 2 TD
- IND – Andrew Luck – 20/31, 224 yards, 2 TD

**Top rushers**

- MIN – Adrian Peterson – 16 rushes, 60 yards
- IND – Donald Brown – 16 rushes, 45 yards

**Top receivers**

- MIN – Percy Harvin – 12 receptions, 104 yards
- IND – Donnie Avery – 9 receptions, 111 yards

==== Week 3: vs. San Francisco 49ers ====
Week 3: San Francisco 49ers at Minnesota Vikings – Game summary

Quarter	1	2	3	4	Total
49ers	0	3	10	0	**13**
**Vikings**	7	10	0	7	**24**

at Mall of America Field at Hubert H. Humphrey Metrodome, Minneapolis, Minnesota

- Date: September 23
- Game time: 12:00 p.m. CDT
- Game weather: None (domed stadium)
- Game attendance: 57,288
- Referee: Ken Roan (86)
- TV announcers (Fox): Kenny Albert, Daryl Johnston and Tony Siragusa
- Recap, Game Book

Game information

**First quarter**

- MIN – Kyle Rudolph 1-yard pass from Christian Ponder (Blair Walsh kick), 7:20. Vikings 7–0. **Drive: 16 plays, 82 yards, 7:40.**

**Second quarter**

- SF – David Akers 29-yard field goal, 12:13. Vikings 7–3. **Drive: 13 plays, 54 yards, 5:40.**
- MIN – Christian Ponder 23-yard run (Blair Walsh kick), 5:29. Vikings 14–3. **Drive: 11 plays, 80 yards, 6:44.**
- MIN – Blair Walsh 52-yard field goal, 0:00. Vikings 17–3. **Drive: 9 plays, 33 yards, 0:52.**

**Third quarter**

- SF – David Akers 29-yard field goal, 12:46. Vikings 17–6. **Drive: 4 plays, 3 yards, 2:14.**
- SF – Vernon Davis 1-yard pass from Alex Smith (David Akers kick), 6:17. Vikings 17–13. **Drive: 9 plays, 86 yards, 5:00.**

**Fourth quarter**

- MIN – Kyle Rudolph 2-yard pass from Christian Ponder (Blair Walsh kick), 14:17. Vikings 24–13. **Drive: 12 plays, 86 yards, 7:00.**

**Top passers**

- SF – Alex Smith – 24/35, 204 yards, TD, INT
- MIN – Christian Ponder – 21/35, 198 yards, 2 TD

**Top rushers**

- SF – Frank Gore – 12 rushes, 63 yards
- MIN – Adrian Peterson – 25 rushes, 86 yards

**Top receivers**

- SF – Mario Manningham – 5 receptions, 56 yards
- MIN – Percy Harvin – 9 receptions, 89 yards

==== Week 4: at Detroit Lions ====
Week 4: Minnesota Vikings at Detroit Lions – Game summary

Quarter	1	2	3	4	Total
**Vikings**	10	3	7	0	**20**
Lions	3	3	0	7	**13**

at Ford Field, Detroit, Michigan

- Date: September 30
- Game time: 1:00 p.m. EDT/12:00 p.m. CDT
- Game weather: None (domed stadium)
- Game attendance: 63,616
- Referee: Clete Blakeman (34)
- TV announcers (Fox): Thom Brennaman, Brian Billick and Laura Okmin
- Recap, Game Book

Game information

**First quarter**

- MIN – Percy Harvin 105-yard kickoff return (Blair Walsh kick), 14:48. Vikings 7–0. **Drive: 0 plays, 0 yards, 0:12.**
- DET – Jason Hanson 40-yard field goal, 13:06. Vikings 7–3. **Drive: 4 plays, 58 yards, 1:42.**
- MIN – Blair Walsh 49-yard field goal, 1:16. Vikings 10–3. **Drive: 7 plays, 60 yards, 3:53.**

**Second quarter**

- MIN – Blair Walsh 27-yard field goal, 8:14. Vikings 13–3. **Drive: 11 plays, 82 yards, 4:56.**
- DET – Jason Hanson 31-yard field goal, 1:46. Vikings 13–6. **Drive: 14 plays, 67 yards, 6:28.**

**Third quarter**

- MIN – Marcus Sherels 77-yard punt return (Blair Walsh kick), 13:09. Vikings 20–6.

**Fourth quarter**

- DET – Matthew Stafford 1-yard run (Jason Hanson kick), 2:56. Vikings 20–13. **Drive: 11 plays, 75 yards, 3:12.**

**Top passers**

- MIN – Christian Ponder – 16/26, 111 yards
- DET – Matthew Stafford – 30/51, 319 yards

**Top rushers**

- MIN – Adrian Peterson – 21 rushes, 102 yards
- DET – Mikel Leshoure – 13 rushes, 26 yards

**Top receivers**

- MIN – Jerome Simpson – 4 receptions, 50 yards
- DET – Joique Bell – 6 receptions, 72 yards

==== Week 5: vs. Tennessee Titans ====
Week 5: Tennessee Titans at Minnesota Vikings – Game summary

Quarter	1	2	3	4	Total
Titans	0	0	0	7	**7**
**Vikings**	7	6	10	7	**30**

at Mall of America Field at Hubert H. Humphrey Metrodome, Minneapolis, Minnesota

- Date: October 7
- Game time: 3:25 p.m. CDT
- Game weather: None (domed stadium)
- Game attendance: 57,652
- Referee: Jeff Triplette (42)
- TV announcers (CBS): Bill Macatee and Steve Tasker
- Recap, Game Book

Game information

**First quarter**

- MIN – Percy Harvin 4-yard run (Blair Walsh kick), 2:31. Vikings 7–0. **Drive: 9 plays, 91 yards, 4:59.**

**Second quarter**

- MIN – Blair Walsh 42-yard field goal, 10:27. Vikings 10–0. **Drive: 5 plays, 19 yards, 0:57.**
- MIN – Blair Walsh 36-yard field goal, 1:52. Vikings 13–0. **Drive: 12 plays, 77 yards, 5:42.**

**Third quarter**

- MIN – Blair Walsh 26-yard field goal, 5:07. Vikings 16–0. **Drive: 12 plays, 69 yards, 6:24.**
- MIN – Percy Harvin 10-yard pass from Christian Ponder (Blair Walsh kick), 0:05. Vikings 23–0. **Drive: 6 plays, 61 yards, 3:31.**

**Fourth quarter**

- TEN – Jared Cook 10-yard pass from Matt Hasselbeck (Rob Bironas kick), 10:35. Vikings 23–7. **Drive: 12 plays, 77 yards, 4:30.**
- MIN – Kyle Rudolph 15-yard pass from Christian Ponder (Blair Walsh kick), 6:38. Vikings 30–7. **Drive: 6 plays, 43 yards, 3:57.**

**Top passers**

- TEN – Matt Hasselbeck – 26/43, 200 yards, TD
- MIN – Christian Ponder – 25/35, 258 yards, 2 TD

**Top rushers**

- TEN – Chris Johnson – 15 rushes, 24 yards
- MIN – Adrian Peterson – 17 rushes, 88 yards

**Top receivers**

- TEN – Kendall Wright – 9 receptions, 66 yards
- MIN – Percy Harvin – 8 receptions, 108 yards, TD

==== Week 6: at Washington Redskins ====
Week 6: Minnesota Vikings at Washington Redskins – Game summary

Quarter	1	2	3	4	Total
Vikings	9	0	3	14	**26**
**Redskins**	0	17	7	14	**38**

at FedExField, Landover, Maryland

- Date: October 14
- Game time: 4:25 p.m. EDT/3:25 p.m. CDT
- Game weather: Sunny, 74 °F (23 °C)
- Game attendance: 78,476
- Referee: Tony Corrente (99)
- TV announcers (Fox): Dick Stockton, John Lynch and Jennifer Hale
- Recap, Game Book

Game information

**First quarter**

- MIN – Blair Walsh 20-yard field goal, 11:31. Vikings 3–0. **Drive: 9 plays, 78 yards, 3:29.**
- MIN – Blair Walsh 27-yard field goal, 6:18. Vikings 6–0. **Drive: 8 plays, 44 yards, 3:16.**
- MIN – Blair Walsh 27-yard field goal, 1:47. Vikings 9–0. **Drive: 7 plays, 26 yards, 3:46.**

**Second quarter**

- WAS – Kai Forbath 50-yard field goal, 10:51. Vikings 9–3. **Drive: 13 plays, 48 yards, 5:56.**
- WAS – Alfred Morris 1-yard run (Kai Forbath kick), 2:27. Redskins 10–9. **Drive: 11 plays, 90 yards, 6:36.**
- WAS – Darrel Young 6-yard pass from Robert Griffin III (Kai Forbath kick), 2:14. Redskins 17–9. **Drive: 1 play, 6 yards, 0:06.**

**Third quarter**

- WAS – Robert Griffin III 7-yard run (Kai Forbath kick), 9:37. Redskins 24–9. **Drive: 10 plays, 80 yards, 5:23.**
- MIN – Blair Walsh 37-yard field goal, 4:18. Redskins 24–12. **Drive: 11 plays, 42 yards, 5:19.**

**Fourth quarter**

- WAS – Madieu Williams 24-yard interception return (Kai Forbath kick), 12:40. Redskins 31–12.
- MIN – Michael Jenkins 9-yard pass from Christian Ponder (Christian Ponder–Kyle Rudolph pass), 8:02. Redskins 31–20. **Drive: 10 plays, 80 yards, 4:38.**
- MIN – Kyle Rudolph 1-yard pass from Christian Ponder (pass failed), 3:36. Redskins 31–26. **Drive: 8 plays, 67 yards, 2:42.**
- WAS – Robert Griffin III 76-yard run (Kai Forbath kick), 2:43. Redskins 38–26. **Drive: 3 plays, 80 yards, 0:53.**

**Top passers**

- MIN – Christian Ponder – 35/52, 352 yards, 2 TD
- WAS – Robert Griffin III – 17/22, 182 yards, TD

**Top rushers**

- MIN – Adrian Peterson – 17 rushes, 79 yards
- WAS – Robert Griffin III – 13 rushes, 138 yards, 2 TD

**Top receivers**

- MIN – Percy Harvin – 11 receptions, 133 yards
- WAS – Fred Davis – 3 receptions, 46 yards

==== Week 7: vs. Arizona Cardinals ====
Week 7: Arizona Cardinals at Minnesota Vikings – Game summary

Quarter	1	2	3	4	Total
Cardinals	0	7	0	7	**14**
**Vikings**	7	7	7	0	**21**

at Mall of America Field at Hubert H. Humphrey Metrodome, Minneapolis, Minnesota

- Date: October 21
- Game time: 12:00 p.m. CDT
- Game weather: None (domed stadium)
- Game attendance: 61,068
- Referee: Terry McAulay (77)
- TV announcers (Fox): Chris Myers, Tim Ryan and Jaime Maggio
- Recap, Game Book

Game information

**First quarter**

- MIN – Adrian Peterson 13-yard run (Blair Walsh kick), 8:38. Vikings 7–0. **Drive: 5 plays, 88 yards, 2:57.**

**Second quarter**

- ARI – LaRod Stephens-Howling 3-yard run (Jay Feely kick), 12:41. Tied 7–7. **Drive: 4 plays, 16 yards, 2:10.**
- MIN – Percy Harvin 3-yard pass from Christian Ponder (Blair Walsh kick), 6:26. Vikings 14–7. **Drive: 10 plays, 72 yards, 6:15.**

**Third quarter**

- MIN – Harrison Smith 31-yard interception return (Blair Walsh kick), 14:03. Vikings 21–7.

**Fourth quarter**

- ARI – Andre Roberts 6-yard pass from John Skelton (Jay Feely kick), 1:48. Vikings 21–14. **Drive: 7 plays, 79 yards, 2:08.**

**Top passers**

- ARI – John Skelton – 25/36, 262 yards, TD
- MIN – Christian Ponder – 8/17, 58 yards, TD

**Top rushers**

- ARI – LaRod Stephens-Howling – 20 rushes, 104 yards, TD
- MIN – Adrian Peterson – 23 rushes, 153 yards, TD

**Top receivers**

- ARI – Andre Roberts – 7 receptions, 103 yards, TD
- MIN – Percy Harvin – 4 receptions, 37 yards, TD

==== Week 8: vs. Tampa Bay Buccaneers ====
Week 8: Tampa Bay Buccaneers at Minnesota Vikings – Game summary

Quarter	1	2	3	4	Total
**Buccaneers**	10	10	10	6	**36**
Vikings	0	10	7	0	**17**

at Mall of America Field at the Hubert H. Humphrey Metrodome, Minneapolis, Minnesota

- Date: October 25
- Game time: 7:20 p.m. CDT
- Game weather: None (domed stadium)
- Game attendance: 60,860
- Referee: Ron Winter (14)
- TV announcers (NFLN^{[a]}): Brad Nessler, Mike Mayock and Alex Flanagan
- Recap, Game Book

Game information

**First quarter**

- TB – Connor Barth 28-yard field goal, 9:48. Buccaneers 3–0. **Drive: 6 plays, 48 yards, 1:48.**
- TB – Erik Lorig 1-yard pass from Josh Freeman (Connor Barth kick), 3:34. Buccaneers 10–0. **Drive: 8 plays, 48 yards, 4:33.**

**Second quarter**

- TB – Connor Barth 40-yard field goal, 12:20. Buccaneers 13–0. **Drive: 10 plays, 32 yards, 4:20.**
- MIN – Percy Harvin 18-yard pass from Christian Ponder (Blair Walsh kick), 9:39. Buccaneers 13–7. **Drive: 5 plays, 80 yards, 2:41.**
- TB – Mike Williams 3-yard pass from Josh Freeman (Connor Barth kick), 4:30. Buccaneers 20–7. **Drive: 6 plays, 37 yards, 2:38.**
- MIN – Blair Walsh 51-yard field goal, 1:40. Buccaneers 20–10. **Drive: 10 plays, 47 yards, 2:50.**

**Third quarter**

- TB – Doug Martin 64-yard pass from Josh Freeman (Connor Barth kick), 13:39. Buccaneers 27–10. **Drive: 4 plays, 80 yards, 1:21.**
- TB – Connor Barth 38-yard field goal, 7:50. Buccaneers 30–10. **Drive: 8 plays, 38 yards, 4:22.**
- MIN – Adrian Peterson 64-yard run (Blair Walsh kick), 7:28. Buccaneers 30–17. **Drive: 2 plays, 64 yards, 0:22.**

**Fourth quarter**

- TB – Doug Martin 1-yard run (pass failed), 7:03. Buccaneers 36–17. **Drive: 16 plays, 87 yards, 9:09.**

**Top passers**

- TB – Josh Freeman – 19/36, 262 yards, 3 TD
- MIN – Christian Ponder – 19/35, 251 yards, TD

**Top rushers**

- TB – Doug Martin – 29 rushes, 135 yards, TD
- MIN – Adrian Peterson – 15 rushes, 123 yards, TD

**Top receivers**

- TB – Doug Martin – 3 receptions, 79 yards, TD
- MIN – Percy Harvin – 7 receptions, 90 yards, TD

==== Week 9: at Seattle Seahawks ====
Week 9: Minnesota Vikings at Seattle Seahawks – Game summary

Quarter	1	2	3	4	Total
Vikings	7	10	3	0	**20**
**Seahawks**	14	6	7	3	**30**

at CenturyLink Field, Seattle, Washington

- Date: November 4
- Game time: 3:05 p.m. CST/1:05 p.m. PST
- Game weather: Cloudy, 60 °F (16 °C)
- Game attendance: 67,584
- Referee: Jerome Boger (23)
- TV announcers (Fox): Chris Myers, Tim Ryan and Jaime Maggio
- Recap, Game Book

Game information

**First quarter**

- MIN – Adrian Peterson 1-yard run (Blair Walsh kick), 13:15. Vikings 7–0. **Drive: 4 plays, 80 yards, 1:45.**
- SEA – Golden Tate 6-yard pass from Russell Wilson (Steven Hauschka kick), 8:52. Tied 7–7. **Drive: 3 plays, 17 yards, 1:23.**
- SEA – Sidney Rice 11-yard pass from Russell Wilson (Steven Hauschka kick), 3:15. Seahawks 14–7. **Drive: 9 plays, 78 yards, 4:05.**

**Second quarter**

- MIN – Adrian Peterson 4-yard run (Blair Walsh kick), 11:46. Tied 14–14. **Drive: 11 plays, 80 yards, 6:29.**
- MIN – Blair Walsh 36-yard field goal, 5:25. Vikings 17–14. **Drive: 8 plays, 58 yards, 3:49.**
- SEA – Golden Tate 11-yard pass from Russell Wilson (kick blocked), 0:44. Seahawks 20–17. **Drive: 12 plays, 80 yards, 4:41.**

**Third quarter**

- SEA – Marshawn Lynch 3-yard run (Steven Hauschka kick), 4:09. Seahawks 27–17. **Drive: 9 plays, 72 yards, 6:15.**
- MIN – Blair Walsh 55-yard field goal, 1:47. Seahawks 27–20. **Drive: 6 plays, 44 yards, 2:22.**

**Fourth quarter**

- SEA – Steven Hauschka 40-yard field goal, 6:23. Seahawks 30–20. **Drive: 9 plays, 38 yards, 5:26.**

**Top passers**

- MIN – Christian Ponder – 11/22, 63 yards
- SEA – Russell Wilson – 16/24, 173 yards, 3 TD

**Top rushers**

- MIN – Adrian Peterson – 17 rushes, 182 yards, 2 TD
- SEA – Marshawn Lynch – 26 rushes, 124 yards, TD

**Top receivers**

- MIN – Jerome Simpson – 1 reception, 14 yards
- SEA – Sidney Rice – 4 receptions, 54 yards, TD

==== Week 10: vs. Detroit Lions ====
Week 10: Detroit Lions at Minnesota Vikings – Game summary

Quarter	1	2	3	4	Total
Lions	0	3	7	14	**24**
**Vikings**	10	3	3	18	**34**

at Mall of America Field at Hubert H. Humphrey Metrodome, Minneapolis, Minnesota

- Date: November 11
- Game time: 12:00 p.m. CST
- Game weather: None (domed stadium)
- Game attendance: 64,059
- Referee: Pete Morelli (135)
- TV announcers (Fox): Dick Stockton, John Lynch and Jennifer Hale
- Recap, Game Book

Game information

**First quarter**

- MIN – Jarius Wright 3-yard pass from Christian Ponder (Blair Walsh kick), 7:52. Vikings 7–0. **Drive: 7 plays, 67 yards, 3:31.**
- MIN – Blair Walsh 48-yard field goal, 5:41. Vikings 10–0. **Drive: 4 plays, −5 yards, 1:57.**

**Second quarter**

- DET – Jason Hanson 41-yard field goal, 11:07. Vikings 10–3. **Drive: 12 plays, 69 yards, 6:47.**
- MIN – Blair Walsh 23-yard field goal, 4:41. Vikings 13–3. **Drive: 13 plays, 81 yards, 6:26.**

**Third quarter**

- MIN – Blair Walsh 23-yard field goal, 5:11. Vikings 16–3. **Drive: 9 plays, 43 yards, 4:53.**
- DET – Brandon Pettigrew 16-yard pass from Matthew Stafford (Jason Hanson kick), 2:55. Vikings 16–10. **Drive: 4 plays, 81 yards, 2:16.**

**Fourth quarter**

- MIN – Kyle Rudolph 20-yard pass from Christian Ponder (Adrian Peterson run), 14:15. Vikings 24–10. **Drive: 8 plays, 62 yards, 3:40.**
- DET – Titus Young 1-yard pass from Matthew Stafford (Jason Hanson kick), 11:32. Vikings 24–17. **Drive: 6 plays, 80 yards, 2:43.**
- MIN – Adrian Peterson 61-yard run (Blair Walsh kick), 8:06. Vikings 31–17. **Drive: 2 plays, 75 yards, 1:07.**
- MIN – Blair Walsh 33-yard field goal, 4:36. Vikings 34–17. **Drive: 5 plays, 30 yards, 3:16.**
- DET – Calvin Johnson 11-yard pass from Matthew Stafford (Jason Hanson kick), 1:53. Vikings 34–24. **Drive: 10 plays, 80 yards, 2:43.**

**Top passers**

- DET – Matthew Stafford – 28/42, 329 yards, 3 TD
- MIN – Christian Ponder – 24/32, 221 yards, 2 TD

**Top rushers**

- DET – Mikel Leshoure – 13 rushes, 43 yards
- MIN – Adrian Peterson – 27 rushes, 171 yards, TD

**Top receivers**

- DET – Calvin Johnson – 12 receptions, 207 yards, TD
- MIN – Jarius Wright – 3 receptions, 65 yards, TD

==== Week 12: at Chicago Bears ====
Week 12: Minnesota Vikings at Chicago Bears – Game summary

Quarter	1	2	3	4	Total
Vikings	3	0	7	0	**10**
**Bears**	10	15	3	0	**28**

at Soldier Field, Chicago, Illinois

- Date: November 25
- Game time: 12:00 p.m. CST
- Game weather: Partly cloudy, 41 °F (5 °C)
- Game attendance: 62,306
- Referee: Scott Green (19)
- TV announcers (Fox): Kenny Albert, Daryl Johnston and Tony Siragusa
- Recap, Game Book

Game information

**First quarter**

- MIN – Blair Walsh 40-yard field goal, 12:17. Vikings 3–0. **Drive: 4 plays, 6 yards, 0:50.**
- CHI – Michael Bush 1-yard run (Robbie Gould kick), 7:17. Bears 7–3. **Drive: 6 plays, 34 yards, 2:50.**
- CHI – Robbie Gould 47-yard field goal, 0:32. Bears 10–3. **Drive: 10 plays, 25 yards, 5:13.**

**Second quarter**

- CHI – Michael Bush 1-yard run (Adam Podlesh run), 4:01. Bears 18–3. **Drive: 14 plays, 80 yards, 7:59.**
- CHI – Matt Spaeth 13-yard pass from Jay Cutler (Robbie Gould kick), 1:48. Bears 25–3. **Drive: 1 play, 13 yards, 0:07.**

**Third quarter**

- MIN – Kyle Rudolph 2-yard pass from Christian Ponder (Blair Walsh kick), 10:44. Bears 25–10. **Drive: 5 plays, 40 yards, 2:01.**
- CHI – Robbie Gould 46-yard field goal, 3:57. Bears 28–10. **Drive: 12 plays, 51 yards, 6:47.**

**Fourth quarter**

- No scoring plays.

**Top passers**

- MIN – Christian Ponder – 22/43, 159 yards, TD
- CHI – Jay Cutler – 23/31, 188 yards, TD

**Top rushers**

- MIN – Adrian Peterson – 18 rushes, 108 yards
- CHI – Michael Bush – 21 rushes, 60 yards, 2 TD

**Top receivers**

- MIN – Kyle Rudolph – 5 receptions, 55 yards, TD
- CHI – Brandon Marshall – 12 receptions, 92 yards

==== Week 13: at Green Bay Packers ====
Week 13: Minnesota Vikings at Green Bay Packers – Game summary

Quarter	1	2	3	4	Total
Vikings	0	14	0	0	**14**
**Packers**	10	0	10	3	**23**

at Lambeau Field, Green Bay, Wisconsin

- Date: December 2
- Game time: 12:00 p.m. CST
- Game weather: Cloudy, 45 °F (7 °C)
- Game attendance: 70,567
- Referee: Ed Hochuli (85)
- TV announcers (Fox): Joe Buck, Troy Aikman and Pam Oliver
- Recap, Game Book

Game information

**First quarter**

- GB – James Jones 32-yard pass from Aaron Rodgers (Mason Crosby kick), 11:26. Packers 7–0. **Drive: 8 plays, 75 yards, 3:34.**
- GB – Mason Crosby 30-yard field goal, 4:07. Packers 10–0. **Drive: 12 plays, 52 yards, 5:56.**

**Second quarter**

- MIN – Kyle Rudolph 7-yard pass from Christian Ponder (Blair Walsh kick), 12:18. Packers 10–7. **Drive: 14 plays, 71 yards, 6:49.**
- MIN – Adrian Peterson 82-yard run (Blair Walsh kick), 5:08. Vikings 14–10. **Drive: 3 plays, 91 yards, 1:27.**

**Third quarter**

- GB – Mason Crosby 47-yard field goal, 7:47. Vikings 14–13. **Drive: 12 plays, 51 yards, 6:04.**
- GB – James Starks 22-yard run (Mason Crosby kick), 2:12. Packers 20–14. **Drive: 4 plays, 51 yards, 1:53.**

**Fourth quarter**

- GB – Mason Crosby 31-yard field goal, 4:00. Packers 23–14. **Drive: 18 plays, 73 yards, 11:00.**

**Top passers**

- MIN – Christian Ponder – 12/25, 119 yards, TD
- GB – Aaron Rodgers – 27/35, 286 yards, TD

**Top rushers**

- MIN – Adrian Peterson – 21 rushes, 210 yards, TD
- GB – James Starks – 15 rushes, 66 yards, TD

**Top receivers**

- MIN – Kyle Rudolph – 6 receptions, 51 yards, TD
- GB – Randall Cobb – 6 receptions, 62 yards

==== Week 14: vs. Chicago Bears ====
Week 14: Chicago Bears at Minnesota Vikings – Game summary

Quarter	1	2	3	4	Total
Bears	0	7	0	7	**14**
**Vikings**	14	0	7	0	**21**

at Mall of America Field at Hubert H. Humphrey Metrodome, Minneapolis, Minnesota

- Date: December 9
- Game time: 12:00 p.m. CST
- Game weather: None (domed stadium)
- Game attendance: 64,134
- Referee: Walt Coleman (65)
- TV announcers (Fox): Kenny Albert, Daryl Johnston and Tony Siragusa
- Recap, Game Book

Game information

**First quarter**

- MIN – Adrian Peterson 1-yard run (Blair Walsh kick), 11:53. Vikings 7–0. **Drive: 6 plays, 80 yards, 3:07.**
- MIN – Adrian Peterson 1-yard run (Blair Walsh kick), 8:42. Vikings 14–0. **Drive: 3 plays, 5 yards, 1:07.**

**Second quarter**

- CHI – Alshon Jeffery 23-yard pass from Jay Cutler (Robbie Gould kick), 1:52. Vikings 14–7. **Drive: 7 plays, 69 yards, 3:41.**

**Third quarter**

- MIN – Harrison Smith 56-yard interception return (Blair Walsh kick), 3:27. Vikings 21–7.

**Fourth quarter**

- CHI – Brandon Marshall 16-yard pass from Jason Campbell (Robbie Gould kick), 1:48. Vikings 21–14. **Drive: 10 plays, 76 yards, 2:02.**

**Top passers**

- CHI – Jay Cutler – 22/44, 260 yards, TD
- MIN – Christian Ponder – 11/17, 91 yards

**Top rushers**

- CHI – Matt Forté – 13 rushes, 85 yards
- MIN – Adrian Peterson – 31 rushes, 154 yards, 2 TD

**Top receivers**

- CHI – Brandon Marshall – 10 receptions, 160 yards, TD
- MIN – Michael Jenkins – 4 receptions, 36 yards

==== Week 15: at St. Louis Rams ====
Week 15: Minnesota Vikings at St. Louis Rams – Game summary

Quarter	1	2	3	4	Total
**Vikings**	7	23	3	3	**36**
Rams	0	7	0	15	**22**

at Edward Jones Dome, St. Louis, Missouri

- Date: December 16
- Game time: 12:00 p.m. CST
- Game weather: None (domed stadium)
- Game attendance: 55,751
- Referee: Alberto Riveron (57)
- TV announcers (Fox): Gus Johnson, Charles Davis and Kristina Pink
- Recap, Game Book

Game information

**First quarter**

- MIN – Christian Ponder 5-yard run (Blair Walsh kick), 7:07. Vikings 7–0. **Drive: 10 plays, 45 yards, 5:38.**

**Second quarter**

- STL – Brian Quick 4-yard pass from Sam Bradford (Greg Zuerlein kick), 12:39. Tied 7–7. **Drive: 9 plays, 73 yards, 3:36.**
- MIN – Adrian Peterson 82-yard run (Blair Walsh kick), 12:21. Vikings 14–7. **Drive: 1 play, 82 yards, 0:18.**
- MIN – Blair Walsh 50-yard field goal, 9:11. Vikings 17–7. **Drive: 4 plays, −4 yards, 1:41.**
- MIN – Everson Griffen 29-yard interception return (Blair Walsh kick), 8:25. Vikings 24–7.
- MIN – Blair Walsh 38-yard field goal, 3:11. Vikings 27–7. **Drive: 10 plays, 48 yards, 3:18.**
- MIN – Blair Walsh 42-yard field goal, 0:00. Vikings 30–7. **Drive: 5 plays, 29 yards, 1:00.**

**Third quarter**

- MIN – Blair Walsh 53-yard field goal, 5:56. Vikings 33–7. **Drive: 10 plays, 25 yards, 5:16.**

**Fourth quarter**

- STL – Danny Amendola 6-yard pass from Sam Bradford (Greg Zuerlein kick), 13:39. Vikings 33–14. **Drive: 15 plays, 80 yards, 7:17.**
- STL – Lance Kendricks 6-yard pass from Sam Bradford (Sam Bradford–Danny Amendola pass), 7:48. Vikings 33–22. **Drive: 5 plays, 88 yards, 2:05.**
- MIN – Blair Walsh 51-yard field goal, 5:31. Vikings 36–22. **Drive: 5 plays, 47 yards, 2:17.**

**Top passers**

- MIN – Christian Ponder – 17/24, 131 yards
- STL – Sam Bradford – 35/55, 377 yards, 3 TD

**Top rushers**

- MIN – Adrian Peterson – 24 rushes, 212 yards, TD
- STL – Steven Jackson – 13 rushes, 73 yards

**Top receivers**

- MIN – Jerome Simpson – 4 receptions, 27 yards
- STL – Brandon Gibson – 6 receptions, 76 yards

==== Week 16: at Houston Texans ====
Week 16: Minnesota Vikings at Houston Texans – Game summary

Quarter	1	2	3	4	Total
**Vikings**	7	6	3	7	**23**
Texans	3	0	3	0	**6**

at Reliant Stadium, Houston, Texas

- Date: December 23
- Game time: 12:00 p.m. CST
- Game weather: None (retractable roof closed)
- Game attendance: 71,688
- Referee: John Parry (132)
- TV announcers (Fox): Chris Myers, Tim Ryan and Jaime Maggio
- Recap, Game Book

Game information

**First quarter**

- HOU – Shayne Graham 51-yard field goal, 10:50. Texans 3–0. **Drive: 9 plays, 46 yards, 4:10.**
- MIN – Kyle Rudolph 3-yard pass from Christian Ponder (Blair Walsh kick), 6:19. Vikings 7–3. **Drive: 8 plays, 78 yards, 4:31.**

**Second quarter**

- MIN – Blair Walsh 56-yard field goal, 8:15. Vikings 10–3. **Drive: 12 plays, 41 yards, 5:21.**
- MIN – Blair Walsh 41-yard field goal, 0:37. Vikings 13–3. **Drive: 5 plays, 21 yards, 1:02.**

**Third quarter**

- MIN – Blair Walsh 39-yard field goal, 11:31. Vikings 16–3. **Drive: 9 plays, 52 yards, 3:29.**
- HOU – Shayne Graham 33-yard field goal, 0:26. Vikings 16–6. **Drive: 11 plays, 46 yards, 5:17.**

**Fourth quarter**

- MIN – Toby Gerhart 3-yard run (Blair Walsh kick), 4:44. Vikings 23–6. **Drive: 10 plays, 64 yards, 6:01.**

**Top passers**

- MIN – Christian Ponder – 16/30, 174 yards, TD
- HOU – Matt Schaub – 18/32, 178 yards

**Top rushers**

- MIN – Adrian Peterson – 25 rushes, 86 yards
- HOU – Ben Tate – 4 rushes, 17 yards

**Top receivers**

- MIN – Jarius Wright – 5 receptions, 53 yards
- HOU – Andre Johnson – 7 receptions, 97 yards

==== Week 17: vs. Green Bay Packers ====
Week 17: Green Bay Packers at Minnesota Vikings – Game summary

Quarter	1	2	3	4	Total
Packers	0	10	14	10	**34**
**Vikings**	10	10	7	10	**37**

at Mall of America Field at Hubert H. Humphrey Metrodome, Minneapolis, Minnesota

- Date: December 30
- Game time: 3:25 p.m. CST
- Game weather: None (domed stadium)
- Game attendance: 64,134
- Referee: Mike Carey (94)
- TV announcers (Fox): Joe Buck, Troy Aikman and Pam Oliver
- Recap, Game Book

Game information

**First quarter**

- MIN – Blair Walsh 54-yard field goal, 10:47. Vikings 3–0. **Drive: 10 plays, 41 yards, 4:13.**
- MIN – Adrian Peterson 7-yard run (Blair Walsh kick), 5:44. Vikings 10–0. **Drive: 7 plays, 60 yards, 3:30.**

**Second quarter**

- MIN – Blair Walsh 37-yard field goal, 14:51. Vikings 13–0. **Drive: 11 plays, 34 yards, 4:42.**
- GB – Greg Jennings 3-yard pass from Aaron Rodgers (Mason Crosby kick), 4:01. Vikings 13–7. **Drive: 12 plays, 42 yards, 5:06.**
- MIN – Jarius Wright 8-yard pass from Christian Ponder (Blair Walsh kick), 1:07. Vikings 20–7. **Drive: 7 plays, 60 yards, 2:54.**
- GB – Mason Crosby 51-yard field goal, 0:00. Vikings 20–10. **Drive: 7 plays, 47 yards, 1:07.**

**Third quarter**

- GB – Greg Jennings 5-yard pass from Aaron Rodgers (Mason Crosby kick), 11:56. Vikings 20–17. **Drive: 6 plays, 80 yards, 3:04.**
- MIN – Adrian Peterson 2-yard pass from Christian Ponder (Blair Walsh kick), 4:00. Vikings 27–17. **Drive: 9 plays, 50 yards, 4:17.**
- GB – James Jones 8-yard pass from Aaron Rodgers (Mason Crosby kick), 2:04. Vikings 27–24. **Drive: 4 plays, 87 yards, 1:56.**

**Fourth quarter**

- GB – Mason Crosby 40-yard field goal, 12:21. Tied 27–27. **Drive: 8 plays, 28 yards, 2:39.**
- MIN – Michael Jenkins 3-yard pass from Christian Ponder (Blair Walsh kick), 7:54. Vikings 34–27. **Drive: 7 plays, 79 yards, 4:27.**
- GB – Jordy Nelson 2-yard pass from Aaron Rodgers (Mason Crosby kick), 2:54. Tied 34–34. **Drive: 11 plays, 78 yards, 5:00.**
- MIN – Blair Walsh 29-yard field goal, 0:00. Vikings 37–34. **Drive: 8 plays, 61 yards, 2:54.**

**Top passers**

- GB – Aaron Rodgers – 28/40, 365 yards, 4 TD
- MIN – Christian Ponder – 16/28, 234 yards, 3 TD

**Top rushers**

- GB – DuJuan Harris – 14 rushes, 70 yards
- MIN – Adrian Peterson – 34 rushes, 199 yards, TD

**Top receivers**

- GB – Greg Jennings – 8 receptions, 120 yards, 2 TD
- MIN – Jarius Wright – 3 receptions, 90 yards, TD

Adrian Peterson rushed for 199 yards, coming up nine yards short of breaking the single season record by Eric Dickerson. This included five rushes for 36 yards on the final drive to set up the winning field goal by Blair Walsh. This game was rated #3 on the Top 20 NFL Games of 2012 on NFL.com as AP2K.

=== Standings ===
NFC North
	W	L	T	PCT	DIV	CONF	PF	PA	STK
^{(3)} Green Bay Packers	11	5	0	.688	5–1	8–4	433	336	L1
^{(6)} Minnesota Vikings	10	6	0	.625	4–2	7–5	379	348	W4
Chicago Bears	10	6	0	.625	3–3	7–5	375	277	W2
Detroit Lions	4	12	0	.250	0–6	3–9	372	437	L8

== Postseason ==
=== Schedule ===
Playoff round	Date	Opponent	Result	Record	Venue	NFL.com recap
WC	January 5	at Green Bay Packers	L 10–24	0–1	Lambeau Field	Recap

=== Game summaries ===
==== NFC Wild Card Round: at Green Bay Packers ====
NFC Wild Card Round: Minnesota Vikings at Green Bay Packers – Game summary

Quarter	1	2	3	4	Total
Vikings	3	0	0	7	10
Packers	7	10	7	0	24

at Lambeau Field, Green Bay, Wisconsin

- Date: January 5
- Game time: 7:00 p.m. CST
- Game weather: Cloudy, 29 °F (−2 °C)
- Game attendance: 71,548
- Referee: Scott Green (19)
- TV announcers (NBC): Al Michaels, Cris Collinsworth and Michele Tafoya
- Recap, Game Book

Game information

First quarter

- MIN – Blair Walsh 33-yard field goal, 9:26. Vikings 3–0. Drive: 10 plays, 53 yards, 5:34.
- GB – DuJuan Harris 9-yard run (Mason Crosby kick), 0:28. Packers 7–3. Drive: 11 plays, 82 yards, 5:43.

Second quarter

- GB – Mason Crosby 20-yard field goal, 3:25. Packers 10–3. Drive: 11 plays, 72 yards, 5:01.
- GB – John Kuhn 3-yard run (Mason Crosby kick), 0:38. Packers 17–3. Drive: 5 plays, 62 yards, 1:10.

Third quarter

- GB – John Kuhn 9-yard pass from Aaron Rodgers (Mason Crosby kick), 9:25. Packers 24–3. Drive: 12 plays, 80 yards, 5:35.

Fourth quarter

- MIN – Michael Jenkins 50-yard pass from Joe Webb (Blair Walsh kick), 3:39. Packers 24–10. Drive: 3 plays, 66 yards, 0:36.

Passing

- MIN – Joe Webb – 11/30, 180 yards, TD
- GB – Aaron Rodgers – 23/33, 274 yards, TD

Rushing

- MIN – Adrian Peterson – 22 rushes, 99 yards
- GB – DuJuan Harris – 17 rushes, 47 yards, TD

Receiving

- MIN – Michael Jenkins – 3 receptions, 96 yards, TD
- GB – Greg Jennings – 4 receptions, 61 yards

Having secured the NFC's #6 seed, the Vikings traveled to Lambeau Field for a rematch with the Packers, with the two teams meeting in the playoffs for only the second time ever. Despite not starting a game all season, the Vikings started Joe Webb over Christian Ponder due to the latter having an elbow injury. Blair Walsh capped the game's opening drive with a field goal to put the Vikings 3–0 up. However, the Packers then scored 24 unanswered points to take a 24–3 lead in the 3rd quarter. The Vikings tried to rally a comeback with a touchdown to make it 24–10, but it was too little, too late as time ran out for Minnesota.

== Statistics ==
=== Team leaders ===
Category	Player(s)	Value
Passing yards	Christian Ponder	2,935
Passing touchdowns	Christian Ponder	18
Rushing yards	Adrian Peterson	2,097 *
Rushing touchdowns	Adrian Peterson	12
Receiving yards	Percy Harvin	677
Receiving touchdowns	Kyle Rudolph	9
Points	Blair Walsh	141
Kickoff return yards	Percy Harvin	574
Punt return yards	Marcus Sherels	287
Tackles	Chad Greenway	148
Sacks	Jared Allen	12.0
Interceptions	Harrison Smith; Antoine Winfield	3
Forced fumbles	Jamarca Sanford	4

- Vikings single season record.

=== League rankings ===
Category	Total yards	Yards per game	NFL rank (out of 32)
Passing offense	2,751	171.9	31st
Rushing offense	2,634	164.6	2nd
Total offense	5,385	336.6	20th
Passing defense	3,908	244.2	24th
Rushing defense	1,692	105.8	11th
Total defense	5,600	350.0	16th

== Pro Bowl ==
Four Minnesota Vikings players were selected for the 2013 Pro Bowl: two on offense (running back partners Adrian Peterson and Jerome Felton), one on defense (DE Jared Allen) and one special teamer (K Blair Walsh). Of these, Peterson, Felton and Walsh were selected as starters, with Allen going as a reserve.

With the withdrawal of Dallas Cowboys LB DeMarcus Ware on January 10 because of a shoulder injury, Vikings LB Chad Greenway was called up to the NFC roster as a replacement. TE Kyle Rudolph was also added to the NFC roster for his first Pro Bowl two weeks later after Atlanta Falcons TE Tony Gonzalez dropped out due to injury. Rookie Matt Kalil was also added later as a replacement for the Washington Redskins' tackle, Trent Williams, yet another casualty of injury. Rudolph was named the game's MVP.
