= Chad Greenway =

American football player (born 1983)

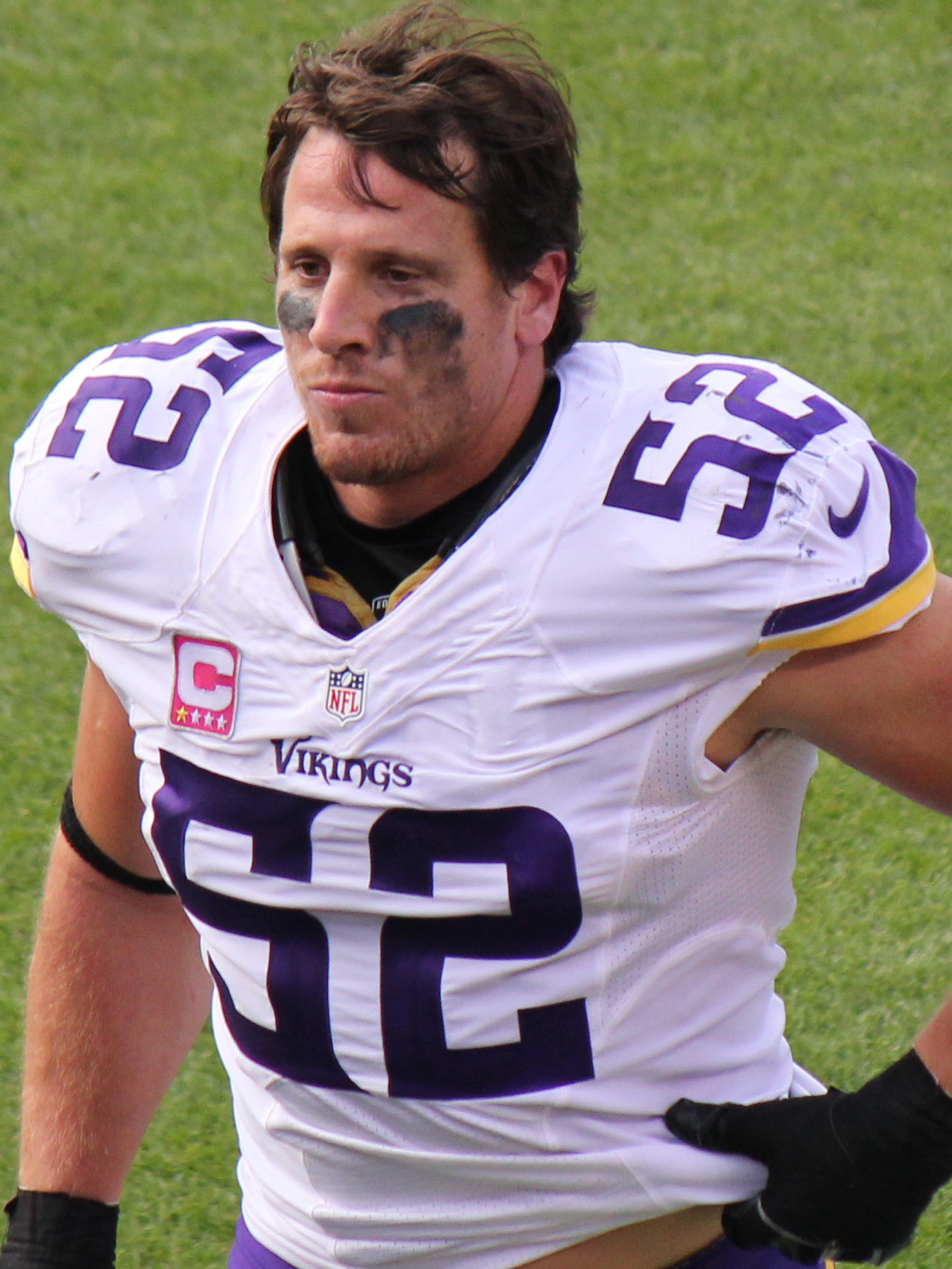
- Greenway with the Minnesota Vikings in 2014

No. 52
- Position: Linebacker

Personal information
- Born: January 12, 1983 (age 43); Mount Vernon, South Dakota, U.S.
- Listed height: 6 ft 3 in (1.91 m)
- Listed weight: 237 lb (108 kg)

Career information
- High school: Mount Vernon
- College: Iowa (2001–2005)
- NFL draft: 2006: 1st round, 17th overall pick

Career history
- Minnesota Vikings (2006–2016)

Awards and highlights
- Second-team All-Pro (2012); 2× Pro Bowl (2011, 2012); "Whizzer" White NFL Man of the Year (2015); Minnesota Vikings All-Mall of America Field Team; Second-team All-American (2005); 2× First-team All-Big Ten (2004, 2005); Second-team All-Big Ten (2003)

Career NFL statistics
- Total tackles: 1,101
- Sacks: 18
- Forced fumbles: 8
- Fumble recoveries: 11
- Interceptions: 11
- Defensive touchdowns: 2
- Stats at Pro Football Reference

Chad Greenway (born January 12, 1983) is an American former professional football player who spent his entire 11-year career as a linebacker with the Minnesota Vikings of the National Football League (NFL). He played college football for the Iowa Hawkeyes, and was selected by the Vikings in the first round of the 2006 NFL draft.

== Early life ==
Greenway attended Mount Vernon High School in Mount Vernon, South Dakota, where he was a three-time South Dakota All-state performer, earning first-team honors as a junior and senior and third-team honors as a sophomore. He was named Gatorade Football Player of the Year as a senior in 2001. also Argus Leader and Sports Max Player of the Year. He also earned first-team All-conference honors for three straight seasons, as well as MVP honors. He played quarterback and free safety and returned punts and kickoffs, helping prep team win two consecutive state titles as a junior and senior. His career totals include 364 rushing attempts for 3,118 yards and 171-290 passes for 2,572 yards. On defense, he recorded 407 tackles and 23 interceptions. As a senior, he completed 62 of his 114 pass attempts for 1,147 yards and rushed for 1,320 yards at quarterback, and also added 132 tackles and four interceptions at safety. Greenway also lettered in basketball, baseball and track & field at Mount Vernon. Greenways are large hog producers in the area and currently own the largest sow production facility in south east South Dakota. Chad credits his daily work on the farm for developing his work ethic that he took into college and the NFL.

== College career ==
Greenway attended the University of Iowa, and played for the Iowa Hawkeyes football team from 2002 to 2005. He redshirted his freshman season in 2001. As a redshirt freshman in 2002, he suffered a knee injury that required surgery and did not play in the first four games. In 2003, he started at outside linebacker in all 13 games and was named second-team All-Big Ten. Greenway was named the Big Ten Conference's joint Defensive Player of the Week vs. Arizona State, and won the Hustle Team Award at Iowa.

In 2004, he was named a first-team All-American by Pro Football Weekly, a second-team All-American by CNNSI.com, and a third-team All-American by CollegeSportsReport.com. Within the conference, Greenway was named first-team All-Big Ten and selected as a first-team All-Big Ten player by Collegefootballnews.com. Greenway was selected by the team as Iowa's Special Teams Player of the Year, won the Hustle Team Award for defense, and was one of three juniors selected to the team Leadership Council for 2004 season.

In 2005, Greenway was named preseason All-America by The Sporting News, NationalChamps.net, and was named to the preseason honorable mention All-America squad selected by NationalChamps.net. He was ranked as the No. 2 outside linebacker by The Sporting News, and named to the Bronko Nagurski and Lott Trophy watch lists.

== Professional career ==
Pre-draft measurables
| Height | Weight | Arm length | Hand span | 40-yard dash | 10-yard split | 20-yard split | 20-yard shuttle | Three-cone drill | Vertical jump | Broad jump | Bench press |
|---|---|---|---|---|---|---|---|---|---|---|---|
| 6 ft 2 1/2 in (1.89 m) | 242 lb (110 kg) | 31 1/4 in (0.79 m) | 9 1/8 in (0.23 m) | 4.60 s | 1.66 s | 2.75 s | 4.22 s | 7.00 s | 38 in (0.97 m) | 10 ft 0 in (3.05 m) | 19 reps |
All values from NFL Combine/Iowa's Pro Day

=== Minnesota Vikings ===
==== 2006 ====
The Minnesota Vikings selected Greenway in the first round (17th overall) of the 2006 NFL draft. Greenway was the third linebacker drafted in 2006, behind Ohio State's A. J. Hawk (fifth overall) and Florida State's Ernie Sims (ninth overall).

On July 23, 2006, the Vikings signed Greenway to a five-year, $10.75 million contract that includes $6.14 million guaranteed.

Throughout training camp, Greenway competed to be a starting outside linebacker against E. J. Henderson and Ben Leber. On August 14, 2006, Greenway tore his ACL in his left leg while covering a kickoff in the first quarter of the Vikings' 16–13 loss to the Oakland Raiders in their first preseason game. He missed his entire rookie season in 2006.

==== 2007 ====
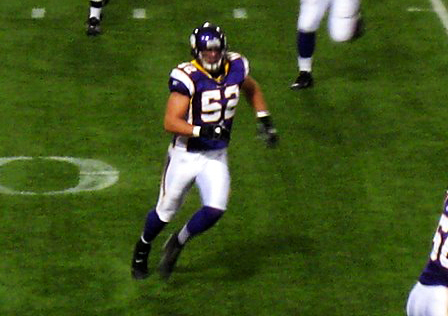
Greenway in 2007

The Minnesota Vikings hired Leslie Frazier as their new defensive coordinator after Mike Tomlin accepted the head coaching position with the Pittsburgh Steelers. Greenway entered training camp slated as a starting outside linebacker. Head coach Brad Childress named Greenway the starting weakside linebacker to begin the regular season, alongside Ben Leber and middle linebacker E. J. Henderson.

He made his professional regular season debut and first career start in the Minnesota Vikings' season-opener against the Atlanta Falcons and recorded ten combined tackles (four solo) in their 24–3 victory. On November 18, 2007, he recorded seven combined tackles, a season-high two pass deflections, and made his first career interception off a pass by quarterback Daunte Culpepper during a 29–22 victory against the Oakland Raiders in Week 11. In Week 12, Greenway made three solo tackles, a pass deflection, and returned an interception for his first career touchdown in the Vikings' 41–17 win at the New York Giants. Greenway intercepted a pass by Giants' quarterback Eli Manning and returned it for a 37-yard touchdown in the fourth quarter. On December 9, 2007, he collected a season-high 13 combined tackles (eight solo) during a 27–7 victory at the San Francisco 49ers in Week 14. Greenway started all 16 games in 2007 and recorded 105 combined tackles (78 solo), four pass deflections, two forced fumbles, two interceptions, and one touchdown.

==== 2008 ====
Head coach Brad Childress retained Greenway and Ben Leber as the starting outside linebackers in 2008, along with middle linebacker E. J. Henderson. On September 21, 2008, Greenway recorded nine combined tackles and made his first career sack on quarterback Jake Delhomme during a 20–10 win against the Carolina Panthers in Week 3. In Week 11, he collected a season-high 16 solo tackles, made a pass deflection, and a sack in the Vikings' 13–10 loss at the Tampa Bay Buccaneers. In Week 15, Greenway recorded seven combined tackles, a season-high three pass deflections, and a sack in a 35–14 win at the Arizona Cardinals. Greenway finished the 2008 season with 115 combined tackles (78 solo), a career-high 5.5 sacks, and five pass deflections in 16 games and 15 starts.

The Minnesota Vikings finished first in the NFC North with a 10–6 record. On January 4, 2009, Greenway recorded ten combined tackles (nine solo) during the Vikings' 26–14 loss against the Philadelphia Eagles in the NFC Wildcard Game.

==== 2009 ====
On September 20, 2009, Greenway recorded four combined tackles, deflected two passes, and made a career-high two interceptions during a 27–13 victory at the Detroit Lions in Week 2. Greenway made both interceptions off pass attempts by Lions' quarterback Matthew Stafford. In Week 8, he collected a season-high 11 combined tackles (ten solo) and broke up one pass in the Vikings' 38–26 win at the Green Bay Packers. He started all 16 games in 2009 and recorded 99 combined tackles (80 solo), a career-high six pass deflections, and three interceptions.

The Minnesota Vikings finished first in the NFC North with a 12–4 record and earned a first round bye. On January 17, 2010, he recorded six combined tackles, a pass deflection, and a sack in a 34–3 win against the Dallas Cowboys in the NFC Divisional Round. On January 24, 2010, Greenway made eight combined tackles during a 31–28 loss at the New Orleans Saints in the NFC Championship Game.

==== 2010 ====
Head coach Brad Childress retained Greenway, Ben Leber, and E.J. Henderson as the starting linebackers for the fourth consecutive season. He started in the Minnesota Vikings' season-opener at the New Orleans Saints and collected a season-high 12 combined tackles (nine solo) in their 14–9 loss. On October 24, 2010, he tied his season-high of 12 combined tackles (ten solo) in the Vikings' 28–24 loss at the Green Bay Packers in Week 7. On November 22, 2010, the Minnesota Vikings fired head coach Brad Childress after they lost 31–3 to the Green Bay Packers and fell to a 3–7 record. Defensive coordinator Leslie Frazier was promoted to interim head coach for the remainder of the season. Greenway started in all 16 games in 2010 and recorded 144 combined tackles (109 solo), three interceptions, one pass deflection, a forced fumble, and one fumble recovery.

==== 2011 ====
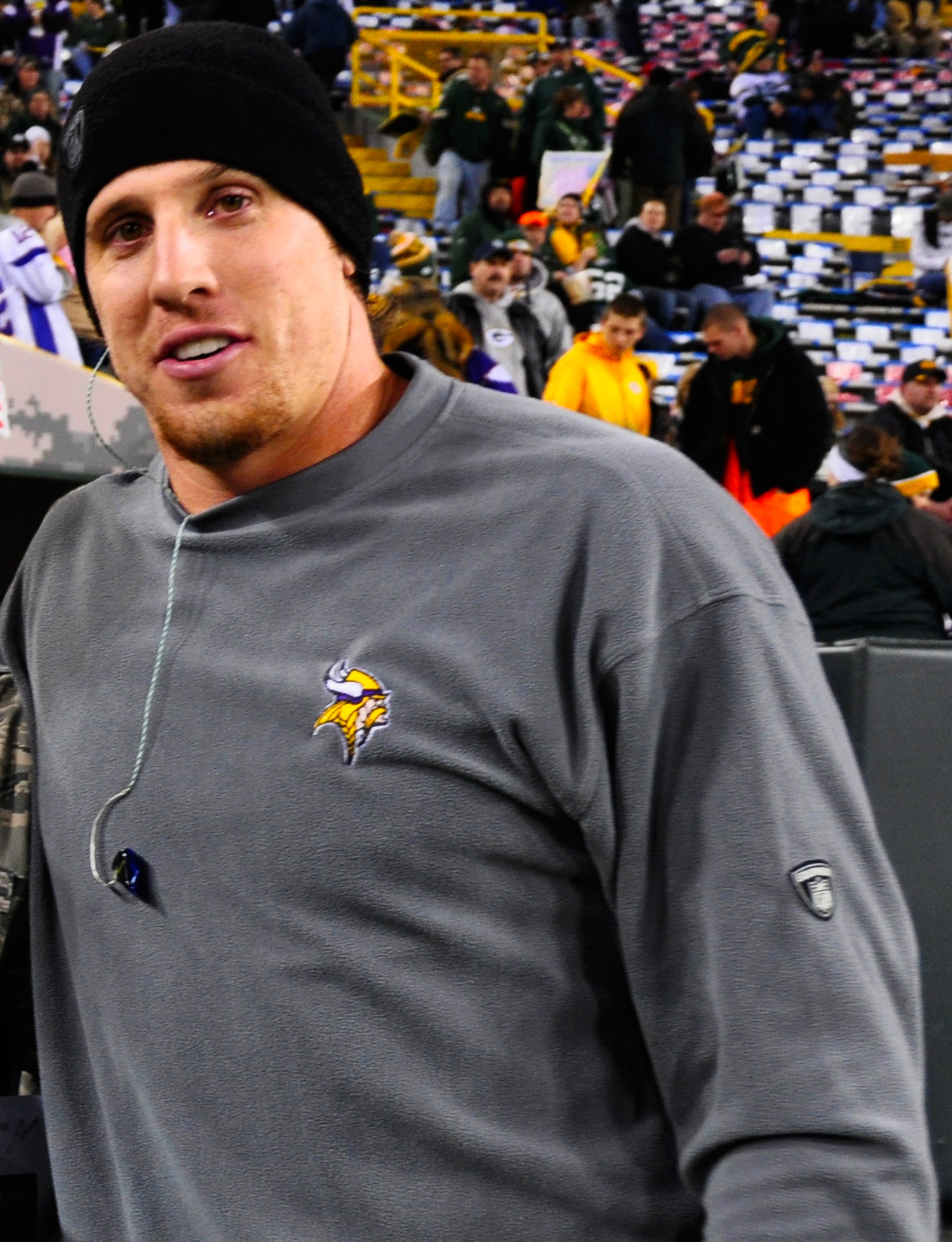
Greenway in 2011

On February 21, 2011, the Minnesota Vikings exercised their franchise player on Greenway. On March 1, 2011, Greenway signed his one-year, $10.09 million franchise tag. Linebackers coach Fred Pagac was promoted to defensive coordinator and retained Greenway as the starting weakside linebacker. Head coach Leslie Frazier named Greenway and Erin Henderson the starting outside linebackers to begin the regular season in 2011, along with middle linebacker E. J. Henderson. On September 5, 2011, the Minnesota Vikings signed Greenway to a five-year, $41 million contract that includes $20 million guaranteed.

On November 20, 2011, Greenway recorded 15 combined tackles (seven solo) and one sack during a 27–21 loss to the Oakland Raiders in Week 11. In Week 12, he collected a season-high 16 combined tackles (seven solo) in the Vikings' 24–14 loss at the Atlanta Falcons. On December 24, 2011, Greenway tied his season-high of 16 combined tackles (four solo) and broke up a pass during a 33–26 victory at the Washington Redskins in Week 16. He started all 16 games in 2011 and recorded a career-high 154 combined tackles (89 solo), two pass deflections, and two sacks. On January 9, 2012, it was announced that Greenway would play in the 2012 Pro Bowl as a replacement for Lance Briggs who was unable to participate due to an injury. This became Greenway's first Pro Bowl selection.

==== 2012 ====
On January 14, 2012, the Minnesota Vikings announced the decision to relieve Fred Pagac of his duties as defensive coordinator and demote him to linebackers coach after the defense was ranked 21st in 2011. They also ranked 26th in pass defense and 11th in run defense in 2011. Head coach Leslie Frazier named Greenway the starting weakside linebacker to start the regular season, along with Erin Henderson and middle linebacker Jasper Brinkley.

He started in the Minnesota Vikings' season-opener against the Jacksonville Jaguars and recorded 13 combined tackles (nine solo) and a season-high two pass deflections in their 26–23 victory. On October 5, 2012, Greenway was fined $21,000 for unnecessary roughness after he struck wide receiver Calvin Johnson in the head and neck area. On November 11, 2012, he recorded five combined tackles, deflected a pass, and made an interception during a 34–24 win against the Detroit Lions in Week 10. In Week 13, Greenway collected a season-high 16 combined tackles (13 solo) during the Vikings' 23–14 loss at the Green Bay Packers. Greenway started in all 16 games in 2012 and recorded 148 combined tackles (98 solo), four pass deflections, three sacks, and an interception.

The Minnesota Vikings finished second in the NFC North with a 10–6 record and earned a Wild Card berth. On January 5, 2013, Greenway recorded 11 combined tackles (ten solo) as the Vikings lost 24–10 at the Green Bay Packers in the NFC Wild Card Round. On January 10, 2013, it was announced that Greenway was selected to play in the 2013 Pro Bowl as a replacement for DeMarcus Ware who was unable to play due to an injury. He was ranked 70th by his fellow players on the NFL Top 100 Players of 2013.

==== 2013 ====
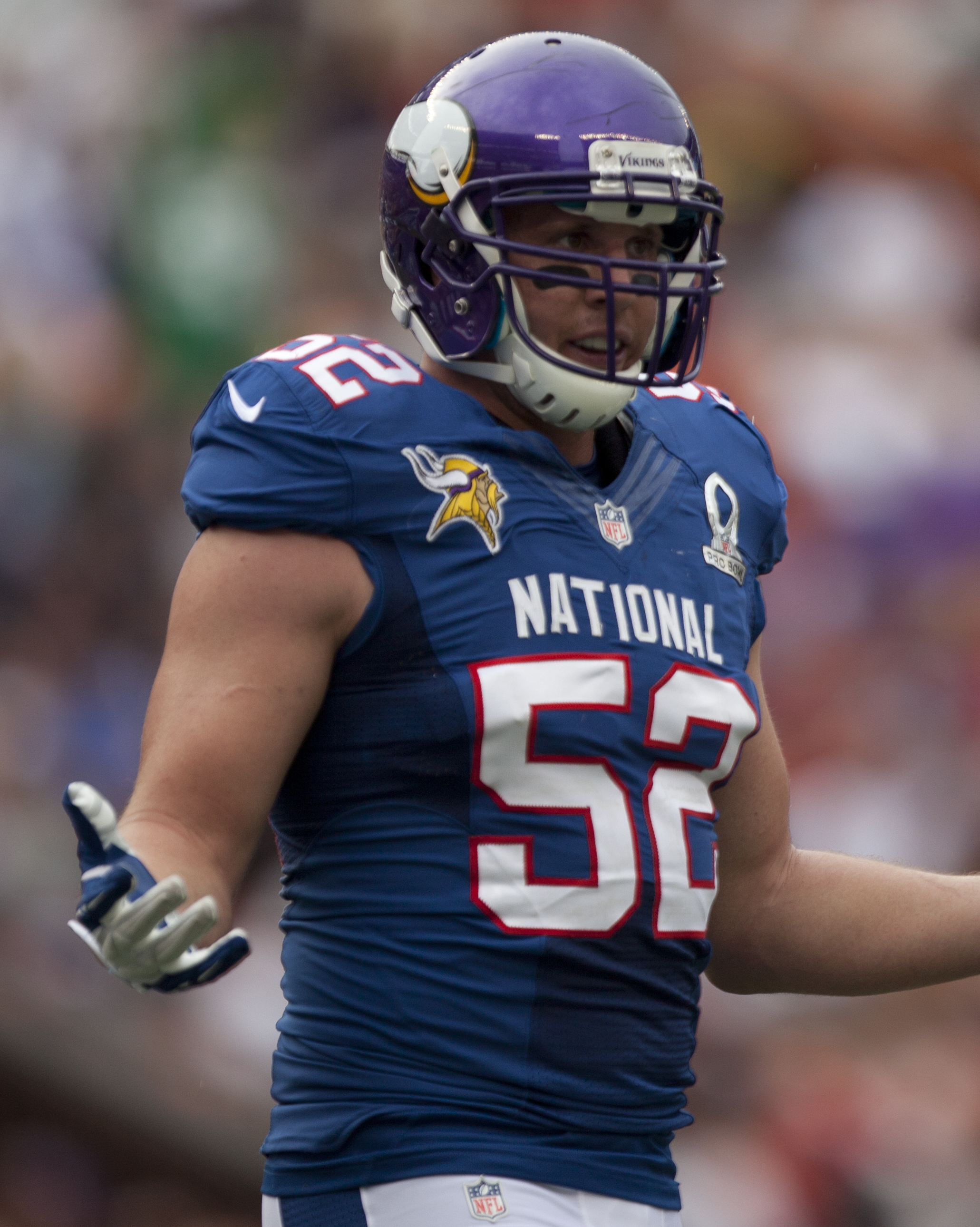
Greenway at the 2013 Pro Bowl

Defensive coordinator Alan Williams retained Greenway as the starting weakside linebacker, along with Marvin Mitchell and middle linebacker Erin Henderson. On September 29, 2013, Greenway collected a season-high ten solo tackles, deflected a pass, made a sack, and made an interception during a 34–27 victory against the Pittsburgh Steelers in their Week 4 game in London. Greenway intercepted a pass by Steelers' quarterback Ben Roethlisberger, that was originally intended for wide receiver Emmanuel Sanders, in the third quarter. In Week 10, he collected a season-high 16 combined tackles (five solo) in the Vikings' 34–27 win against the Washington Redskins. He started all 16 games and recorded 134 combined tackles (83 solo), four pass deflections, three interceptions, and three sacks. On December 30, 2013, the Minnesota Vikings fired head coach Leslie Frazier after they finished the season with a 5–10–1 record.

==== 2014 ====
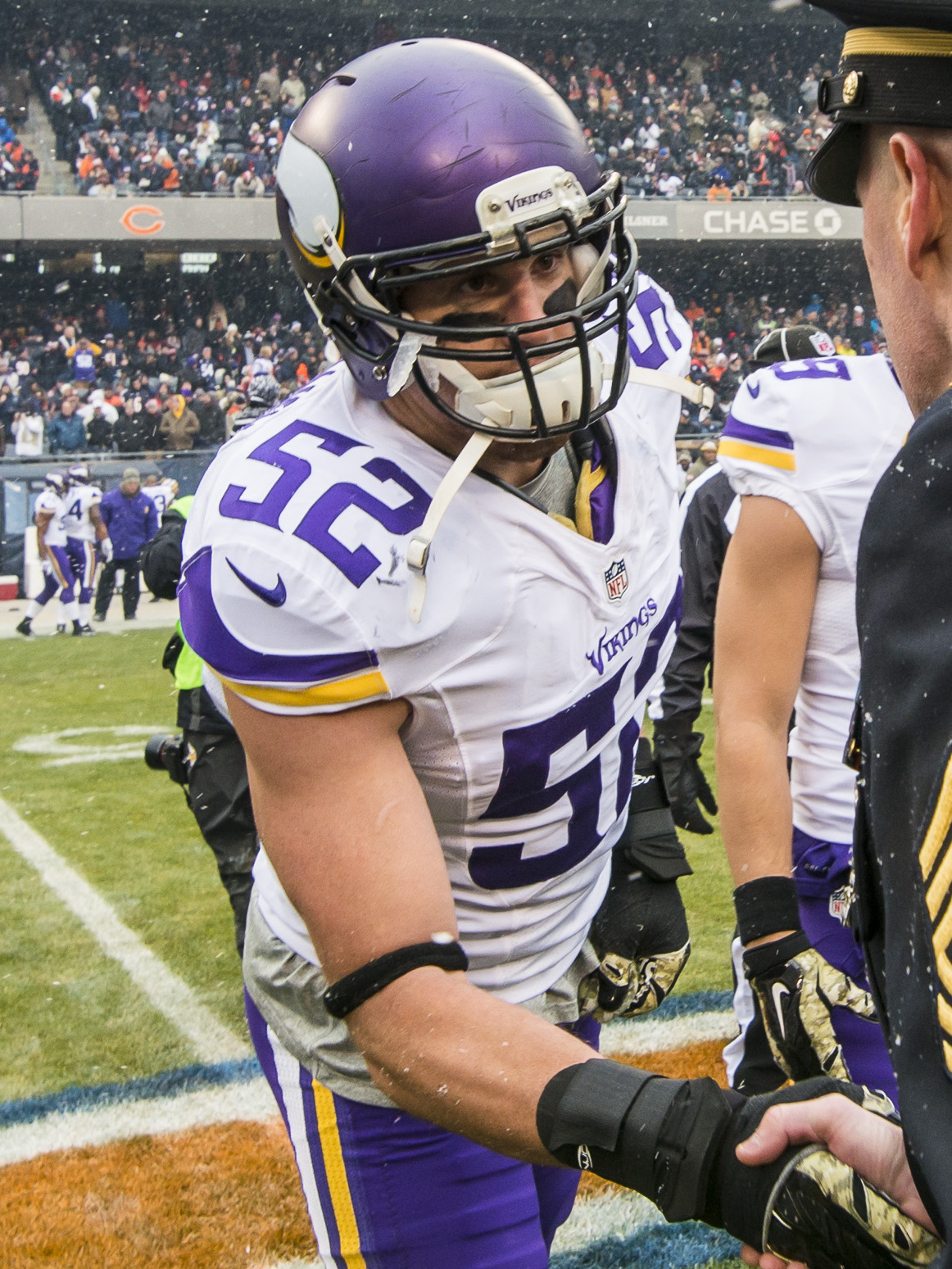
Greenway in 2014

In the 2014 season, Greenway appeared in and started 12 games. He finished with one sack, 93 total tackles, two passes defended, and one forced fumble. He earned the NFLPA Alan Page Community Award for the 2014 season.

==== 2015 ====
In Week 3 of the 2015 season, Greenway recorded a 91-yard interception return for a touchdown in the 31–14 victory over the San Diego Chargers. In the 2015 season, Greenway had 2.5 sacks, 69 total tackles, one interception, and one pass defensed.

==== 2016 ====
On March 31, 2016, Greenway announced that he was returning for an 11th season with the Vikings and that it would be his last. In the 2016 season, Greenway had 41 total tackles, one interception, and one pass defended in 16 games and nine starts. On March 6, 2017, Greenway officially announced his retirement from the National Football League.

=== NFL statistics ===
| Year | Team | GP | COMB | TOTAL | AST | SACK | FF | FR | FR YDS | INT | IR YDS | AVG IR | LNG | TD | PD |
|---|---|---|---|---|---|---|---|---|---|---|---|---|---|---|---|
| 2007 | MIN | 16 | 105 | 78 | 27 | 0.0 | 2 | 4 | 0 | 2 | 39 | 20 | 37 | 1 | 4 |
| 2008 | MIN | 16 | 115 | 86 | 29 | 5.5 | 3 | 0 | 0 | 0 | 0 | 0 | 0 | 0 | 5 |
| 2009 | MIN | 16 | 99 | 80 | 19 | 0.0 | 1 | 3 | 0 | 3 | 49 | 16 | 36 | 0 | 6 |
| 2010 | MIN | 16 | 144 | 109 | 35 | 1.0 | 1 | 1 | 0 | 0 | 0 | 0 | 0 | 0 | 3 |
| 2011 | MIN | 16 | 154 | 89 | 65 | 2.0 | 0 | 1 | 0 | 0 | 0 | 0 | 0 | 0 | 2 |
| 2012 | MIN | 16 | 148 | 98 | 50 | 3.0 | 0 | 2 | 0 | 1 | 3 | 3 | 3 | 0 | 4 |
| 2013 | MIN | 16 | 134 | 83 | 51 | 3.0 | 0 | 0 | 0 | 3 | 23 | 8 | 23 | 0 | 4 |
| 2014 | MIN | 12 | 93 | 56 | 37 | 1.0 | 1 | 0 | 0 | 0 | 0 | 0 | 0 | 0 | 3 |
| 2015 | MIN | 16 | 68 | 55 | 13 | 2.5 | 0 | 0 | 0 | 1 | 91 | 91 | 91 | 1 | 1 |
| 2016 | MIN | 16 | 41 | 26 | 15 | 0.0 | 0 | 0 | 0 | 1 | 17 | 17.0 | 17 | 0 | 1 |
| Career | | 156 | 1,101 | 760 | 341 | 18.0 | 8 | 11 | 0 | 11 | 222 | 20.2 | 91 | 2 | 32 |

== Personal ==
Greenway married in July 2006 to Jenni Capista, a former track and field athlete at Iowa. The couple has four daughters.

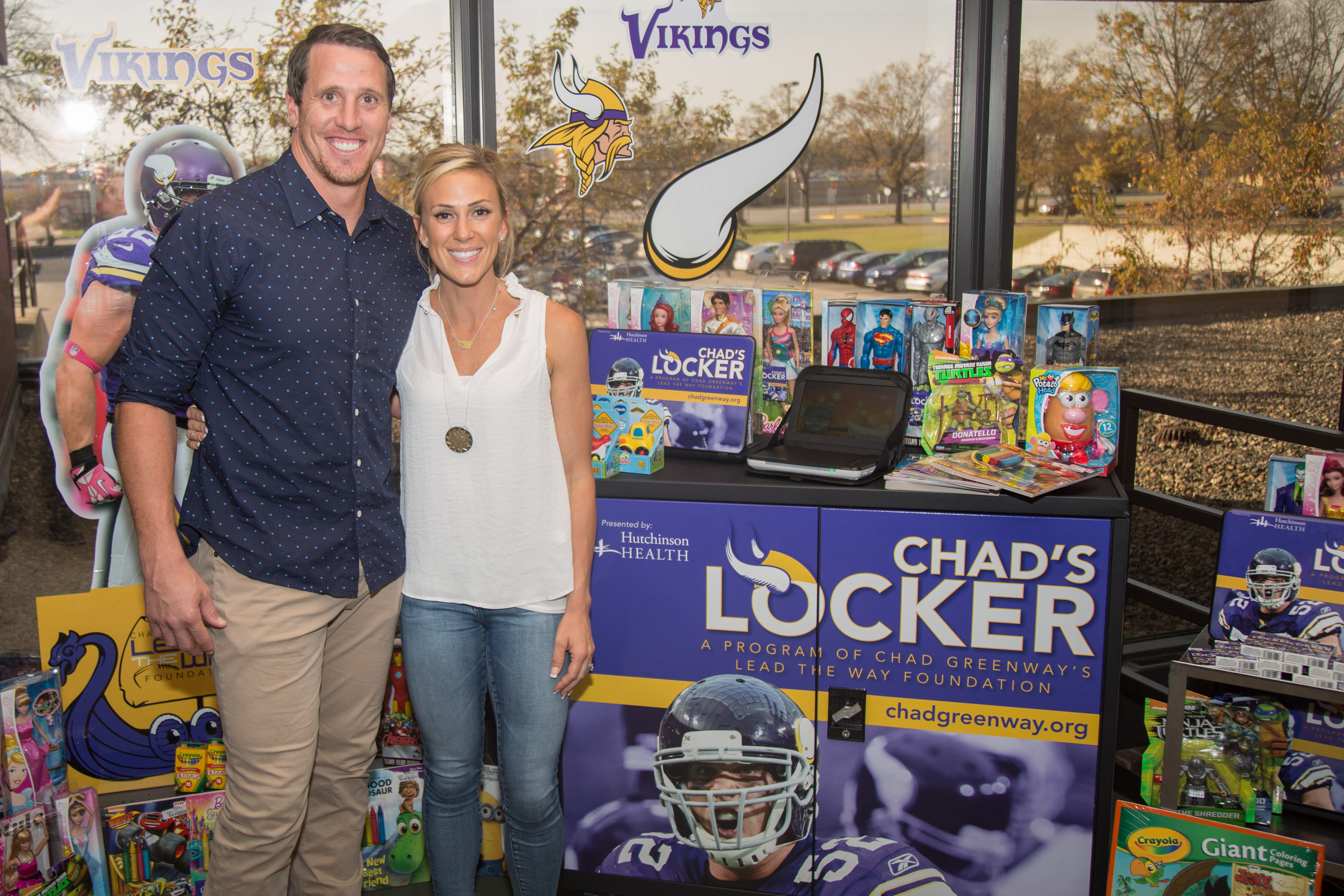
Chad Greenway and wife, Jenni Capista Greenway, at a "Chad's Locker" - one of the four programs they provide through their philanthropic organization Chad and Jenni Greenway's Lead the Way Foundation - installation at Hutchinson Health.

In 2008, the Greenways established a charitable foundation, Chad and Jenni Greenway's Lead The Way Foundation, the mission of which is "to enrich the lives of individuals and families in need" by providing "seriously ill and physically challenged children throughout the Twin Cities with daily support and life-changing experiences." As of 2022, the foundation has helped nearly 375,000 people in the Twin Cities. In the 2016 season, for his charitable work, Greenway was named the Vikings' Community Man of the Year for the fourth consecutive year. In the same year, he was also the Vikings' nominee for the Walter Payton NFL Man of the Year Award.
