= Marvin Mitchell =

American football player (born 1984)

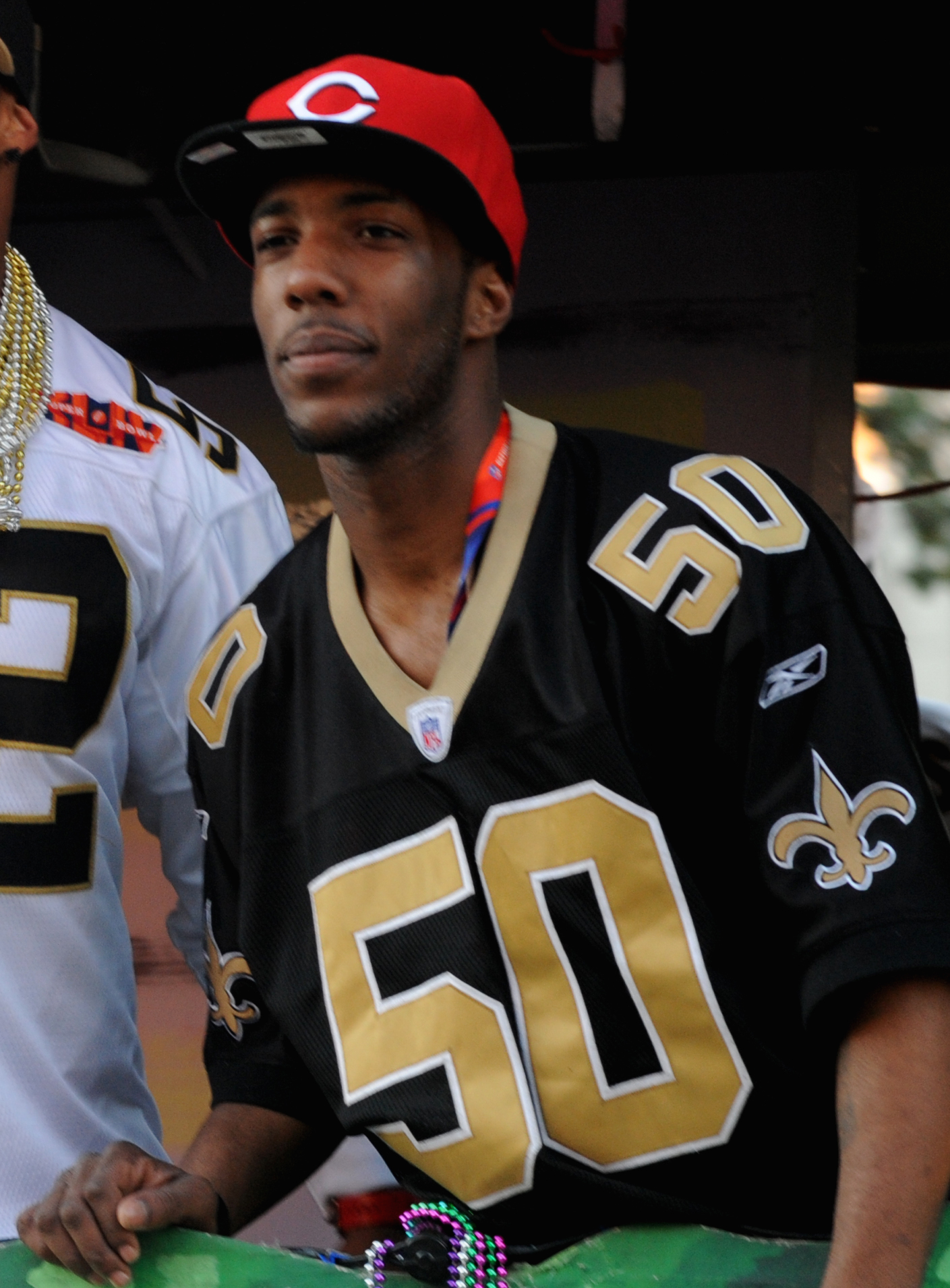
- Mitchell at the 2010 Saints Super Bowl parade

No. 50, 52, 55
- Position: Linebacker

Personal information
- Born: October 21, 1984 (age 42); Norfolk, Virginia, U.S.
- Listed height: 6 ft 3 in (1.91 m)
- Listed weight: 249 lb (113 kg)

Career information
- High school: Lake Taylor (Norfolk)
- College: Tennessee (2002–2006)
- NFL draft: 2007: 7th round, 220th overall pick

Career history
- New Orleans Saints (2007–2010); Miami Dolphins (2011); Minnesota Vikings (2012–2013)

Awards and highlights
- Super Bowl champion (XLIV)

Career NFL statistics
- Total tackles: 170
- Sacks: 1
- Forced fumbles: 4
- Fumble recoveries: 4
- Interceptions: 1
- Stats at Pro Football Reference

Marvin Mitchell (born October 21, 1984) is an American former professional football player who was a linebacker in the National Football League (NFL). He played college football for the Tennessee Volunteers and was selected by the New Orleans Saints in the seventh round of the 2007 NFL draft. Mitchell also played for the Miami Dolphins and Minnesota Vikings.

== Early life ==
Mitchell attended Lake Taylor High School in Norfolk, Virginia, where he was an all-district selection on both sides of the ball, playing tight end on offense. He also played basketball, ran track and threw shot put.

== College career ==
Mitchell attended the University of Tennessee, where he played on the school's football team. Though scheduled to redshirt his freshman year, Mitchell played due to injuries to other players. Mitchell missed the 2004 season stemming from an injury suffered while practicing for the Peach Bowl the previous year.

On May 1, 2006, Mitchell was arrested in Knoxville, Tennessee, and charged with disorderly conduct. He was suspended indefinitely from the team, but allowed to return after reaching an agreement with prosecutors.

== Professional career ==
Pre-draft measurables
Height	Weight	40-yard dash	10-yard split	20-yard split	20-yard shuttle	Three-cone drill	Vertical jump	Broad jump
6 ft 3 in (1.91 m)	249 lb (113 kg)	4.87 s	1.62 s	2.84 s	4.25 s	7.12 s	32 in (0.81 m)	9 ft 0 in (2.74 m)
All values from NFL Combine

=== New Orleans Saints ===
After being selected in the seventh round of the 2007 NFL draft with the 220th overall pick, Mitchell was signed to a three-year contract on June 18, 2007, and was assigned to the practice squad. Due to an injury to Scott Fujita, Mitchell was brought up from the practice squad and made his NFL debut on October 7, 2007, against the Carolina Panthers.

=== Miami Dolphins ===
Mitchell signed with the Miami Dolphins on August 15, 2011. He recorded his first NFL interception in Week 17 against the New York Jets.

=== Minnesota Vikings ===
Mitchell signed with the Minnesota Vikings on April 10, 2012. He started ten games for the Vikings and had 42 total tackles in the 2013 season.

== NFL career statistics ==
Legend
**Bold**	Career high

=== Regular season ===
Year	Team	Games		Tackles					Interceptions					Fumbles			
Year	Team	GP	GS	Cmb	Solo	Ast	Sck	TFL	Int	Yds	TD	Lng	PD	FF	FR	Yds	TD
2007	NOR	10	0	8	8	0	0.0	0	0	0	0	0	0	0	0	0	0
2008	NOR	15	0	10	8	2	0.0	0	0	0	0	0	0	0	1	0	0
2009	NOR	14	2	27	23	4	0.0	1	0	0	0	0	0	0	0	0	0
2010	NOR	**16**	0	**43**	**33**	10	0.0	**3**	0	0	0	0	**2**	**2**	**2**	**2**	0
2011	MIA	**16**	0	30	25	5	**1.0**	1	**1**	**55**	0	**55**	**2**	1	0	0	0
2012	MIN	11	1	10	9	1	0.0	0	0	0	0	0	0	1	0	0	0
2013	MIN	**16**	**10**	42	19	**23**	0.0	**3**	0	0	0	0	1	0	1	0	0
Career		98	13	170	125	45	1.0	8	1	55	0	55	5	4	4	2	0

=== Playoffs ===
Year	Team	Games		Tackles					Interceptions					Fumbles			
Year	Team	GP	GS	Cmb	Solo	Ast	Sck	TFL	Int	Yds	TD	Lng	PD	FF	FR	Yds	TD
2009	NOR	**3**	**1**	**5**	**3**	**2**	0.0	0	0	0	0	0	0	0	0	0	0
2010	NOR	1	**1**	0	0	0	0.0	0	0	0	0	0	0	0	0	0	0
2012	MIN	1	0	0	0	0	0.0	0	0	0	0	0	0	0	0	0	0
Career		5	2	5	3	2	0.0	0	0	0	0	0	0	0	0	0	0
