= Audie Cole =

American football player (born 1989)

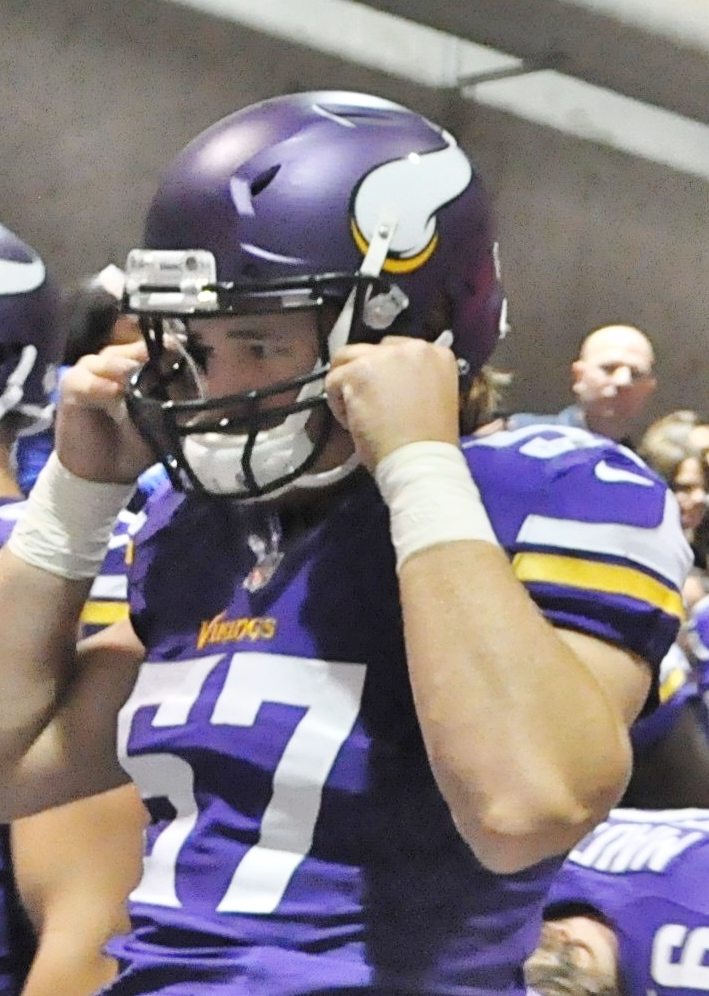
- Cole with the Minnesota Vikings in 2013

No. 57
- Position: Linebacker

Personal information
- Born: June 1, 1989 (age 37); Monroe, Michigan, U.S.
- Listed height: 6 ft 4 in (1.93 m)
- Listed weight: 246 lb (112 kg)

Career information
- High school: Monroe
- College: NC State
- NFL draft: 2012: 7th round, 210th overall pick

Career history
- Minnesota Vikings (2012–2016); Jacksonville Jaguars (2017)*; New Orleans Saints (2017)*
- * Offseason or practice squad member only

Career NFL statistics
- Total tackles: 86
- Sacks: 1
- Fumble recoveries: 2
- Stats at Pro Football Reference

Audie Raymond Cole (born June 1, 1989) is an American former professional football player who was a linebacker in the National Football League (NFL). He played college football for the NC State Wolfpack and was selected by the Minnesota Vikings in the seventh round of the 2012 NFL draft.

== Early life ==
Cole played as a quarterback, safety and linebacker at Monroe High School. He was a three-year starter at quarterback and also played defense as a senior. He threw for 3,285 yards and 23 touchdowns in his career and was named All-league as a senior after rushing for 10 touchdowns and throwing for more than 1,700 yards. Cole also lettered in baseball and basketball at Monroe, and was a Golden Glove winner in boxing.

Regarded as a two-star recruit, Cole was ranked as a top-30 player out of the state of Michigan by Rivals.com. He chose North Carolina State University after originally committing to Central Michigan.

== College career ==
As a freshman at NC State in 2007, Cole redshirted the season at linebacker.

=== Freshman season (2008) ===
In 2008, Cole saw action mainly on special teams, and his 213 specialty snaps ranked third on the team. He totalled 14 tackles during his freshman season.

=== Sophomore season (2009) ===
As a sophomore in 2009, Cole started all 12 games, leading NC State's in tackles with 85 stops, finishing second in tackles for loss with eight and also tallying four sacks. He led the team in stops versus Florida State (9) and North Carolina (10). He racked up a career-high 13 tackles at Virginia Tech. He was recipient of the team's Al Michaels Award, which is given to the player who "puts team before self.

=== Junior season (2010) ===
As a junior in 2010, Cole played the Sam linebacker spot, but moved to middle linebacker in the spring, leading the defense with 809 snaps from scrimmage. He tied for the team lead in tackles with 97, while his 10.5 tackles for loss ranked third among Wolfpack players. He tied his career-high with 13 stops in the win at North Carolina. In that game, he had a six-yard sack and also recovered a fumble. He led the team in tackles at Central Florida with a dozen, including a sack, two others for loss, and also pulled down his first career interception. For his performance, Cole was named the ACC Defensive Back of the Week by the league and the ACC Player of the Week by Rivals.com.

=== Senior season (2011) ===
In the spring drills, Cole moved to middle linebacker for his senior season.

== Professional career ==
Pre-draft measurables
Height	Weight	Arm length	Hand span	40-yard dash	10-yard split	20-yard split	20-yard shuttle	Three-cone drill	Vertical jump	Broad jump	Bench press
6 ft 4 1/8 in (1.93 m)	246 lb (112 kg)	32 3/4 in (0.83 m)	10 in (0.25 m)	4.81 s	1.68 s	2.86 s	4.29 s	6.96 s	35 in (0.89 m)	9 ft 6 in (2.90 m)	15 reps
All values from NFL Combine

=== Minnesota Vikings ===
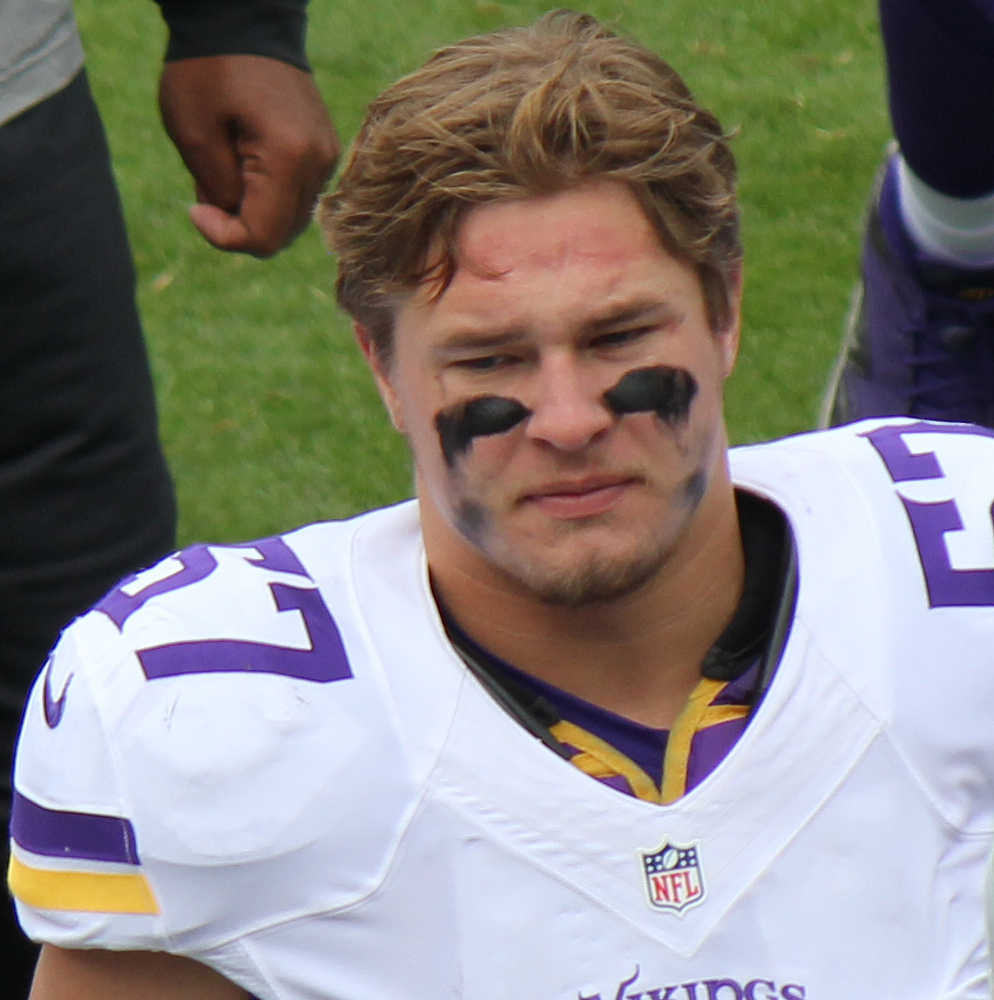
Cole with the Vikings in 2015

Cole intercepted 2 passes, on consecutive plays, in the Vikings second preseason game against the Buffalo Bills returning both for touchdowns on August 17, 2012.

On November 7, 2013, Cole was waived by the Vikings to make room for offensive tackle Kevin Murphy who was signed out of the practice squad due to injuries on the team.

On November 9, 2013, Minnesota Vikings re-signed Audie Cole. In Week 13, he was named starting MLB, in place of Erin Henderson.

In Week 9 on November 8, 2015, Cole started his first game of the season in place of injured Eric Kendricks against the St. Louis Rams. Unfortunately, Cole suffered a fractured ankle in the fourth quarter against the Rams, ending his season.

=== Jacksonville Jaguars ===
On March 11, 2017, Cole signed with the Jacksonville Jaguars. He was released on August 26, 2017.

=== New Orleans Saints ===
On August 28, 2017, Cole signed with the New Orleans Saints. He was released on September 1, 2017.

== Personal life ==
Cole cut his trademark long hair during the 2013 off season and donated to a charity program benefitting youth fighting cancer (Children With Hair Loss) in Michigan. He took part in 2013 Minnesota Governor's Fishing Opener weekend activities in Park Rapids, Minnesota, helping youth get involved in outdoor activities and helping promote outdoors programs through Minnesota Department of Natural Resources. He graduated in 2011 with a parks, recreation and tourism degree.
