= Stephen Burton =

American gridiron football player (born 1989)

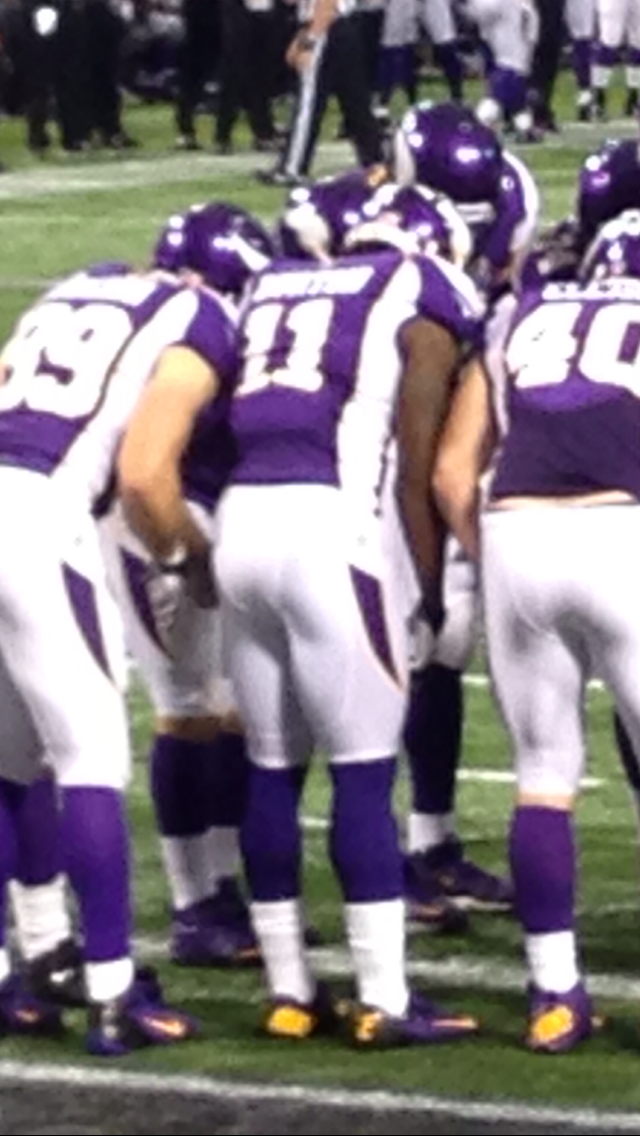
- Burton (#11) with the Minnesota Vikings in 2012

No. 86, 11, 15
- Position: Wide receiver

Personal information
- Born: December 11, 1989 (age 36); Lakewood, California, U.S.
- Listed height: 6 ft 1 in (1.85 m)
- Listed weight: 224 lb (102 kg)

Career information
- High school: Artesia (Lakewood)
- College: West Texas A&M
- NFL draft: 2011: 7th round, 236th overall pick

Career history
- Minnesota Vikings (2011–2012); Jacksonville Jaguars (2013); Calgary Stampeders (2015)*; Winnipeg Blue Bombers (2017)*
- * Offseason or practice squad member only

Career NFL statistics
- Receptions: 15
- Receiving yards: 149
- Receiving touchdowns: 1
- Stats at Pro Football Reference

Stephen Burton (born December 11, 1989) is an American former professional football player who was a wide receiver in the National Football League (NFL). He was selected by the Minnesota Vikings in the seventh round of the 2011 NFL draft. He played college football for the West Texas A&M. Burton retired on April 23, 2014, due to a concussion concern.

== Early life ==
Burton attended Artesia High School in Lakewood, California, where he received offensive Player of the Year honors as a wide receiver and running back. Although having great talent at wide receiver, Burton was offered no scholarships from any college. He eventually chose to attend the Junior College, Long Beach City College.

== College career ==
While attending Long Beach, Burton played wide receiver and was the kick returner for the team. In 2007, he was named team MVP and won Second-team All-Conference as a wide receiver. After playing for Long Beach for his freshman and sophomore years, Burton decided to transfer to University of Oklahoma. However, Burton was unable to obtain enough credits to transfer and eventually decided to attend the Division II school, West Texas A&M University. In his first season playing in a spread offense at West Texas A&M, he had three 100-yard receiving games. During his second year Burton had three 100-yard receiving games again and also had 70 receptions for 1,021 yards and 11 touchdowns.

== Professional career ==
Pre-draft measurables
Height	Weight	Arm length	Hand span	Wingspan	40-yard dash	10-yard split	20-yard split	20-yard shuttle	Three-cone drill	Vertical jump	Broad jump	Bench press
6 ft 1 3/8 in (1.86 m)	221 lb (100 kg)	32 in (0.81 m)	9 1/8 in (0.23 m)	6 ft 3 3/8 in (1.91 m)	4.38 s	1.46 s	2.56 s	4.31 s	7.04 s	35.0 in (0.89 m)	10 ft 4 in (3.15 m)	19 reps
All values from NFL Combine/Pro Day

=== Minnesota Vikings ===
Burton was selected by the Vikings in the seventh round of the 2011 NFL draft with the 236th overall pick. He was signed to the Minnesota Vikings' active roster on October 25, 2011. His promotion was in response to the Vikings releasing wide receiver Bernard Berrian. Burton scored his first NFL touchdown with the Vikings on September 16, 2012, against the Indianapolis Colts. It was a 6-yard reception that was tipped by tight end Kyle Rudolph. Burton was released by the Vikings on August 31, 2013 (along with 18 others) to get to a 53-man roster.

=== Jacksonville Jaguars ===
Burton was claimed off waivers by the Jacksonville Jaguars on September 1, 2013. He was placed on injured reserve on December 9, 2013, due to a concussion. On April 23, 2014, Burton retired at the age of 24 due to concussion concerns.

=== Calgary Stampeders ===
On January 26, 2015, Burton unretired and signed a contract with the Calgary Stampeders of the Canadian Football League (CFL).

=== Winnipeg Blue Bombers ===
On May 11, 2017, Burton signed with the Winnipeg Blue Bombers of the CFL. He was placed on the suspension list on May 28, 2017, and his contract expired at the end of the season.
