= Fred Pagac =

American football player and coach (born 1952)

Profile
- Position: Tight end

Personal information
- Born: April 26, 1952 (age 74); Brownsville, Pennsylvania, U.S.
- Listed height: 6 ft 0 in (1.83 m)
- Listed weight: 222 lb (101 kg)

Career information
- College: Ohio State
- NFL draft: 1974: undrafted

Career history

Playing
- Chicago Bears (1974); Tampa Bay Buccaneers (1976)

Coaching
- Ohio State (1978–1981) Graduate assistant; Ohio State (1982–1995) Linebackers coach; Ohio State (1996–1999) Defensive coordinator; Ohio State (2000) Assistant head coach; Oakland Raiders (2001–2003) Linebackers coach; Kansas City Chiefs (2004–2005) Linebackers coach; Minnesota Vikings (2006–2010) Linebackers coach; Minnesota Vikings (2010–2011) Defensive coordinator; Minnesota Vikings (2012–2013) Linebackers coach; Buffalo Bills (2014) Linebackers coach; Denver Broncos (2015–2017) Outside linebackers coach

Awards and highlights
- Super Bowl champion (50)

Career NFL statistics
- Receptions: 8
- Receiving yards: 94
- Touchdowns: 0
- Stats at Pro Football Reference
- Coaching profile at Pro Football Reference

Frederick Pagac (born April 26, 1952) is an American former professional football player who was a tight end in the National Football League (NFL) and coach. He was signed by the Chicago Bears as an undrafted free agent in 1974. He played college football for the Ohio State Buckeyes.

Pagac also played for the Tampa Bay Buccaneers and has been a coach for the Ohio State Buckeyes, Oakland Raiders, Kansas City Chiefs, Minnesota Vikings and Buffalo Bills.

== Playing career ==
Pagac was signed by the Chicago Bears as an undrafted free agent in 1974. He played one season for the team, making six receptions for 79 yards. After not playing in 1975 Pagac played for the expansion team Tampa Bay Buccaneers in 1976. He finished the season recording two receptions.

== Coaching career ==
Pagac became a coach for the Ohio State Buckeyes in 1978 and coached there until 2000. Pagac began his coaching career at his alma mater as a graduate assistant under Head Coach Woody Hayes from 1978 to 1981; he also spent time as the team's linebackers coach from 1982 to 1995, defensive coordinator from 1996 to 1999, and assistant head coach in 2000. Pagac was a 1998 finalist for the Broyles Award, given annually to the nation's top college football assistant coach.

In 2001, Pagac was hired by the Oakland Raiders to be the team's linebackers coach, and was there until 2003. From 2004 to 2005 he was the linebackers coach for the Kansas City Chiefs. In 2006 the Minnesota Vikings hired him.

On November 22, 2010, Pagac was named interim defensive coordinator for the Vikings, replacing Leslie Frazier, who was promoted to interim head coach after the mid-season replacement of Brad Childress. On January 19, 2011, the interim title was removed and Pagac was named the defensive coordinator of the Vikings.

On January 15, 2012, he was removed as defensive coordinator for the Vikings but remained with the team, returning to his former position as linebackers coach.

On February 7, 2016, Pagac was part of the Broncos coaching staff that won Super Bowl 50. In the game, the Broncos defeated the Carolina Panthers by a score of 24–10.

== Personal life ==
His son, Fred Pagac, Jr. also played at Ohio State and was a member of Ohio State's 2002 national championship team.
