= Ben Leber =

American football player (born 1978)

No. 51, 59
- Position: Linebacker

Personal information
- Born: December 7, 1978 (age 47); Council Bluffs, Iowa, U.S.
- Listed height: 6 ft 3 in (1.91 m)
- Listed weight: 245 lb (111 kg)

Career information
- High school: Vermillion (SD)
- College: Kansas State (1997–2001)
- NFL draft: 2002: 3rd round, 71st overall pick

Career history
- San Diego Chargers (2002–2005); Minnesota Vikings (2006–2010); St. Louis Rams (2011)

Awards and highlights
- PFWA All-Rookie Team (2002); Third-team All-American (2001); First-team All-Big 12 (2001); Second-team All-Big 12 (2000)

Career NFL statistics
- Total tackles: 500
- Sacks: 24
- Forced fumbles: 13
- Fumble recoveries: 12
- Interceptions: 5
- Defensive touchdowns: 1
- Stats at Pro Football Reference

Ben Leber (born December 7, 1978) is an American former professional football player who was a linebacker in the National Football League (NFL). He was selected by the San Diego Chargers in the third round of the 2002 NFL draft and later played for the Minnesota Vikings.

== Early life ==
Lining up primarily at running back, Leber was named to several high school All-America teams at Vermillion High School in Vermillion, South Dakota. As a junior, he rushed for 1,404 yards and 18 touchdowns, and notched 1,350 yards in his senior year. That season, he was declared a Parade Magazine All-America (the only South Dakotan so honored in 1997), an honorable mention All-USA by USA Today, and was selected to play in the North-South Dakota All-Star game. An excellent student, he was also an Academic All-State selection.

== College career ==
At Kansas State, Leber made the switch to full-time linebacker. A two-time All-Big 12 selection, he finished his college career with 216 tackles, 46 tackles for loss, and 13.5 sacks. His 216 career tackles were the fifth most in Kansas State history. As a junior, he earned second-team all-conference honors. The year later, he was an All-America third-team selection by the Associated Press, a consensus All-Big 12 Conference first-team choice, and a team captain. He received a degree in business-general management in 2002.

== Professional career ==
Pre-draft measurables
Height	Weight	40-yard dash	10-yard split	20-yard split	20-yard shuttle	Three-cone drill	Vertical jump	Broad jump	Bench press
6 ft 3 in (1.91 m)	244 lb (111 kg)	4.63 s	1.61 s	2.71 s	4.25 s	6.75 s	32.5 in (0.83 m)	9 ft 6 in (2.90 m)	20 reps
All values from NFL Combine

=== San Diego Chargers ===
Leber was selected by the San Diego Chargers in the third round of the 2002 NFL draft. He was an immediate-impact rookie, playing in all 16 games and starting 14 of them. He was selected to both the Pro Football Weekly and Football Digest All-Rookie teams, finishing the year with 49 tackles, 5 sacks (third on the team), and 3 forced fumbles (first on the team).

In his second season, Leber started every game at strong side linebacker for the Chargers, notching 75 tackles, 3 sacks, 1 pass defensed, and 1 forced fumble. In his third year, he was an every-game starter for the Chargers, finishing the season with 58 tackles, 2 sacks, and 1 fumble recovery. The next season, Leber was injured during training camp and again during the season. This led to him losing his starting position to future Pro-Bowler Shawne Merriman. He finished 2005 with 22 tackles, 2 sacks and 1 fumble recovery.

=== Minnesota Vikings ===
As an unrestricted free agent, Leber was signed by the Minnesota Vikings on March 11, 2006. Playing in 15 games, he finished his first season with the team with 46 tackles, 3 sacks, 1 interception, 3 forced fumbles, 2 fumble recoveries and 1 fumble recovery touchdown. The next year was even better—playing in all 16 games, Leber notched 67 tackles, 5 sacks, 2 forced fumbles, and 1 interception. In 2008, Leber again played the full season, recording 64 tackles, a career-low 1.5 sacks, and 2 interceptions.

=== St. Louis Rams ===
On August 9, 2011, Leber signed with the St. Louis Rams. On December 3, 2011, Leber was waived by the Rams.

=== Retirement ===
Despite having worked out for the Philadelphia Eagles in March 2012, he was unable to find an interested team.

He announced his retirement from professional football on June 18, 2012.

== Career statistics ==
=== College ===
Season	Team	GP	Total	Ast	Comb	SCK	INT	INT TD	PD	FF	Fum Rec	Fum TD
1998	Kansas State	10	19.0	11	30	2.0	0	0	2	1	0	0
1999	Kansas State	11	35.0	23	58	2.0	0	0	3	2	1	0
2000	Kansas State	13	38.0	17	55	3.5	1	0	2	0	0	0
2001	Kansas State	11	55.0	18	73	6.0	0	0	4	0	0	0
	Totals	45	147.0	69	216	13.0	1	0	11	3	1	0

=== Professional ===
==== Regular season ====
Season	Team	GP	Total	Ast	Comb	SCK	INT	INT TD	PD	FF	Fum Rec	Fum TD
2002	San Diego Chargers	16	41.0	9	50	5.0	0	0	1	3	0	0
2003	San Diego Chargers	16	69.0	11	80	3.0	0	0	1	0	0	0
2004	San Diego Chargers	16	49.0	11	60	2.0	0	0	1	0	1	0
2005	San Diego Chargers	9	18.0	4	22	2.0	0	0	1	0	1	0
2006	Minnesota Vikings	15	34.0	12	46	3.0	1	0	4	3	2	1
2007	Minnesota Vikings	16	52.0	15	67	5.0	1	0	4	2	0	0
2008	Minnesota Vikings	16	47.0	17	64	1.5	2	0	7	1	0	0
2009	Minnesota Vikings	16	38	8	46	2.5	0	0	5	1	0	0
2010	Minnesota Vikings	16	35	11	46	0.0	1	0	4	2	0	0
2011	St. Louis Rams	7	11.0	4	15	0.0	0	0	0	0	0	0
	Totals	143	393	103	496	24.0	5	0	28	12	4	1

==== Postseason ====
Season	Team	GP	Tckl	Ast	Total	SCK	INT	INT TD	PD	FF	Fum Rec	Fum TD
2004	San Diego Chargers	1	5.0	2	7	0.0	0	0	0	0	0	0
2009	Minnesota Vikings	1	4.0	0	4	0.0	1	0	0	0	0	0
	Totals	2	9.0	2	11	0.0	1	0	0	0	0	0

== Personal ==
Leber was born in Council Bluffs, Iowa and raised in Vermillion, South Dakota. He is the son of Al and Han Leber. His brother, Jason, was an All-American running back at the University of South Dakota.

His Mother, Han, is Korean.

Leber is married to his wife Abby, and they have 2 sons and 1 daughter.

He is a radio sideline analyst for the Minnesota Vikings. He also broadcasts on KFAN and Co-Hosts Twin Cities Live on ABC affiliate KSTP.
