= 2013 Minnesota Vikings season =

53rd season in franchise history; final one in the Metrodome

- Owner: Zygi Wilf
- General manager: Rick Spielman
- Head coach: Leslie Frazier
- Home stadium: Mall of America Field at the Hubert H. Humphrey Metrodome

Results
- Record: 5–10–1
- Division place: 4th NFC North
- Playoffs: Did not qualify
- Pro Bowlers: KR Cordarrelle Patterson; RB Adrian Peterson

Uniform
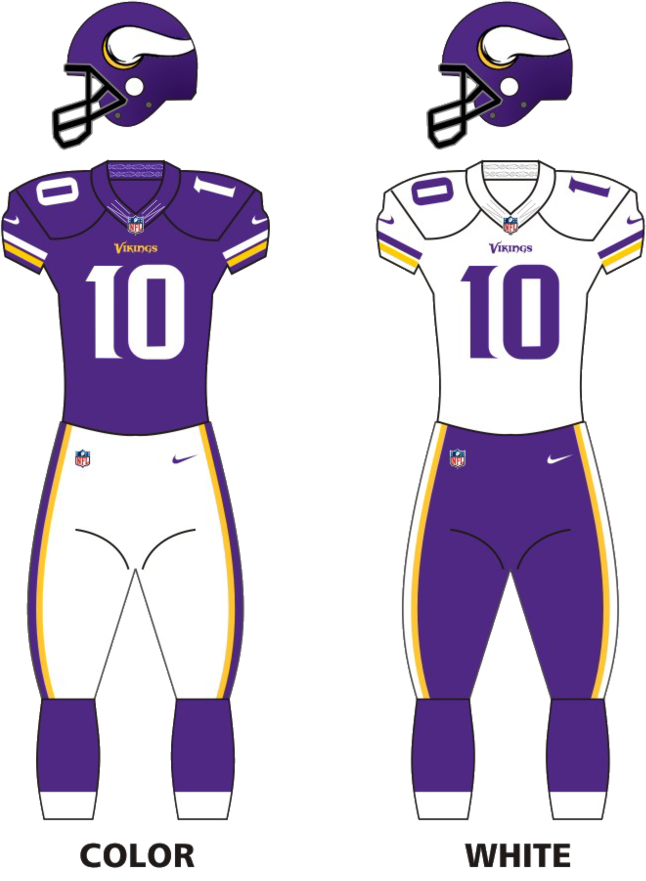

The 2013 season was the Minnesota Vikings' 53rd in the National Football League (NFL). It also marked the Vikings' final season playing their home games at the Hubert H. Humphrey Metrodome; the team played their home games at TCF Bank Stadium for the 2014 and 2015 seasons while construction of U.S. Bank Stadium, which opened in 2016, took place on the site of the Metrodome. Following a Week 9 loss to the Dallas Cowboys, the Vikings were no longer able to match their 10–6 record from 2012, and their loss to the Baltimore Ravens five weeks later sealed their elimination from playoff contention.

The Vikings failed to win a road game (0–7–1) for the first time since 2001. Much like in 2001, the Vikings did moderately well (13th) on offensive yardage (344.2 yards per game) despite a quarterback carousel not present in 2001, but ranked among the worst in defensive yardage (397.6 yards per game); only the Dallas Cowboys gave up more yards on defense with 415.3 per game. The Vikings' defense also allowed the most points in the NFL in 2013 at 480 (30.0 points per game), four points shy of matching the most points the team ever allowed in a single season.

It took until Week 10 for the Vikings to record their first win on American soil, their only other victory up to that point having come in the NFL International Series game against the Pittsburgh Steelers at London's Wembley Stadium in Week 4. Despite winning their last four home games to finish with an overall record of 5–10–1, the Vikings fired head coach Leslie Frazier after just over three seasons with the team.

== Offseason ==
=== 2013 draft ===
Pro Bowler

2013 Minnesota Vikings Draft
Draft order		Player name	Position	College	Contract	Notes
Round	Overall	Player name	Position	College	Contract	Notes
1	23	Sharrif Floyd	Defensive tackle	Florida	4 years / $8 million	
1	25	Xavier Rhodes	Cornerback	Florida State	4 years / $7.8 million	From Seahawks (Note: The Vikings traded WR Percy Harvin to the Seahawks in exchange for first- and seventh-round selections (25th and 214th overall), and a 2014 third-round selection (96th overall).)
1	29	Cordarrelle Patterson	Wide receiver	Tennessee	4 years / $7.2 million	From Patriots (Note: The Vikings traded their second-, third- and seventh-round selections (52nd, 83rd and 229th overall), as well as the fourth-round pick they received from the Lions (102nd overall), (Note: The Vikings traded their 2012 fifth- and seventh-round selections (138th and 223rd overall) to the Lions in exchange for a fourth-round selection (102nd overall) and a 2012 seventh-round selection (219th overall).) to the Patriots in exchange for a first-round selection (29th overall).)
2	52	Traded to the New England Patriots				
3	83	Traded to the New England Patriots				
4	102	Traded to the New England Patriots				From Lions
4	120	Gerald Hodges	Linebacker	Penn State	4 years / $2.58 million	
5	155	Jeff Locke	Punter	UCLA	4 years / $2.344 million	
6	176	Traded to the Arizona Cardinals (Note: The Vikings traded their sixth-round selection to the Cardinals in exchange for CB A. J. Jefferson and a seventh-round selection (213th overall).)				From Titans (Note: The Vikings traded their 2012 seventh-round selection (211th overall) to the Titans in exchange for a sixth-round selection (176th overall).)
6	189	Traded to the Tampa Bay Buccaneers (Note: The Vikings traded their sixth-round selection (189th overall) to the Buccaneers in exchange for sixth- and seventh-round selections (196th and 229th overall).)				
6	196	Jeff Baca	Guard	UCLA	4 years / $2.256 million	From Broncos, via Eagles and Buccaneers
7	213	Michael Mauti	Linebacker	Penn State	4 years / $2.2 million	From Cardinals
7	214	Travis Bond	Guard	North Carolina	4 years / $2.22 million	From Bills via Seahawks
7	229	Everett Dawkins	Defensive tackle	Florida State	4 years / $2.2 million	From Vikings, via Patriots and Buccaneers

=== Roster changes ===
Re-signings
Date	Player name	Position	Contract terms
January 7, 2013	Chase Baker	DT	2 years / $900,000 ^{[RFC]}
March 12, 2013	Joe Berger	C/G	1 year / $945,000
March 12, 2013	Jerome Felton	FB	3 years / $7.5 million
March 12, 2013	Erin Henderson	OLB	2 years / $4 million
March 12, 2013	Phil Loadholt	OT	4 years / $25 million
March 12, 2013	Jamarca Sanford	FS	2 years / $5 million
March 12, 2013	Jerome Simpson	WR	1 year / $2.1 million
March 21, 2013	Andrew Sendejo	FS	1 year / $630,000
March 26, 2013	Marvin Mitchell	OLB	1 year / $765,000
April 12, 2013	A. J. Jefferson	CB	1 year / $1.323 million
April 15, 2013	Troy Kropog	OT	1 year / $630,000
April 22, 2013	Marcus Sherels	CB	1 year / $555,000
October 17, 2013	Brandan Bishop	S	^{[PS]}
October 22, 2013	Shaun Prater	CB	4 years / $2.285 million
October 31, 2013	Chase Ford	TE	2 years / $900,000
November 4, 2013	Justin Trattou	DE	2 years / $1.05 million^{[PS]}
November 9, 2013	Audie Cole	LB	3 years / $1.71 million
November 11, 2013	Kevin Murphy	T	^{[PS]}
December 11, 2013	Bradley Randle	RB	^{[PS]}
December 16, 2013	Mike Remmers	OT	2 years / $900,000
December 18, 2013	Joe Banyard	RB	2 years / $900,000^{[PS]}
December 18, 2013	Spencer Nealy	DE	2 years / $930,000
December 24, 2013	Robert Steeples	CB	3 years / $1.49 million^{[PS]}

^{^[RFC]} Denotes this is a reserve/future contract.
^{^[PS]} Denotes a signing to the Practice Squad.

Departures
Date	Player name	Position	Note	New team
March 4, 2013	Michael Jenkins	WR	Released	New England Patriots
March 11, 2013	Percy Harvin	WR	Traded^{[a]}	Seattle Seahawks
March 12, 2013	Antoine Winfield	CB	Released	Seattle Seahawks
March 14, 2013	Jasper Brinkley	MLB	UFA	Arizona Cardinals
March 15, 2013	Geoff Schwartz	G/T	UFA	Kansas City Chiefs
April 30, 2013	Nicholas Taylor	CB	Released	
May 6, 2013	Chris Kluwe	P	Released	Oakland Raiders
June 10, 2013	Devin Aromashodu	WR	UFA	Chicago Bears
August 31, 2013	Brandon Burton	CB	Released	Buffalo Bills
August 31, 2013	Stephen Burton	WR	Released	Jacksonville Jaguars
August 31, 2013	Tyrone McKenzie	LB	Released	
September 9, 2013	D'Aundre Reed	DE	Injury settlement	San Francisco 49ers
October 1, 2013	DeMarcus Love	OT	Released	Jacksonville Jaguars
October 8, 2013	McLeod Bethel-Thompson	QB	Released	San Francisco 49ers
October 9, 2013	George Johnson	DE	Released	
November 6, 2013	Everett Dawkins	DT	Claimed off practice squad	Dallas Cowboys
November 13, 2013	Travis Bond	G	Claimed off practice squad	Carolina Panthers
November 25, 2013	A. J. Jefferson	CB	Released	

Additions
Date	Player name	Position	Previous team	Contract terms
March 14, 2013	Matt Cassel	QB	Kansas City Chiefs	2 years / $7.4 million
March 15, 2013	Greg Jennings	WR	Green Bay Packers	5 years / $45 million
April 30, 2013	Zach Line	FB	Southern Methodist; Undrafted FA	3 years / $1.49 million
June 24, 2013	Desmond Bishop	LB	Green Bay Packers	1 year / $1.5 million
October 6, 2013	Josh Freeman	QB	Tampa Bay Buccaneers	1 year / $3.0 million
November 26, 2013	Kip Edwards	CB	Buffalo Bills	

Signed and released players
Date signed	Player name	Position	Previous team	Contract terms	Date released
January 7, 2013	Joe Banyard	RB	Minnesota Vikings (re-signed)	2 years / $900,000 ^{[RFC]}	August 31, 2013^{[PS]}
January 7, 2013	LaMark Brown	TE	Minnesota Vikings (re-signed)	2 years / $900,000 ^{[RFC]}	August 26, 2013
January 7, 2013	Bobby Felder	DB	Minnesota Vikings (re-signed)	2 years / $900,000 ^{[RFC]}	October 28, 2013
January 7, 2013	Chase Ford	TE	Minnesota Vikings (re-signed)	2 years / $900,000 ^{[RFC]}	October 29, 2013^{[PS]}
January 7, 2013	Tyler Holmes	G	Minnesota Vikings (re-signed)	2 years / $900,000 ^{[RFC]}	August 26, 2013
January 7, 2013	Kevin Murphy	T	Minnesota Vikings (re-signed)	2 years / $900,000 ^{[RFC]}	November 9, 2013^{[PS]}
January 7, 2013	Chris Summers	WR	Minnesota Vikings (re-signed)	2 years / $900,000 ^{[RFC]}	August 26, 2013
January 9, 2013	T. J. Conley	P	New York Jets (2011)	2 years / $1.05 million	April 29, 2013
January 9, 2013	Greg McCoy	CB	Arizona Cardinals	2 years / $900,000	August 26, 2013
February 11, 2013	Roderick Williams	CB	Edmonton Eskimos (CFL)	3 years / $1.485 million	August 26, 2013
March 19, 2013	Seth Olsen	G/T	Indianapolis Colts	1 year / $650,000	September 9, 2013
April 26, 2013	Lawrence Jackson	DE	Detroit Lions	1 year / $780,000	August 26, 2013
April 29, 2013	Jacob Lacey	CB	Detroit Lions	1 year / $780,000	August 19, 2013
April 30, 2013	Colin Anderson	TE	Furman	3 years / $1.49 million	August 31, 2013
April 30, 2013	Brandan Bishop	S	NC State	3 years / $1.49 million	August 31, 2013
April 30, 2013	Nicholas Edwards	WR	Eastern Washington	3 years / $1.49 million	May 6, 2013
April 30, 2013	Darius Eubanks	S	Georgia Southern	3 years / $1.49 million	August 31, 2013^{[PS]}
April 30, 2013	Erik Highsmith	WR	North Carolina	3 years / $1.49 million	August 26, 2013
April 30, 2013	Mark Jackson	OT	Glenville State	3 years / $1.49 million	May 21, 2013
April 30, 2013	Marquis Jackson	DE	Portland State	3 years / $1.49 million	August 26, 2013
April 30, 2013	Anthony McCloud	DT	Florida State	3 years / $1.49 million	August 31, 2013
April 30, 2013	Bradley Randle	RB	UNLV	3 years / $1.49 million	August 26, 2013
April 30, 2013	Rodney Smith	WR	Florida State	3 years / $1.49 million	August 31, 2013^{[PS]}
April 30, 2013	Collins Ukwu	DE	Kentucky	3 years / $1.49 million	August 31, 2013^{[PS]}
April 30, 2013	James Vandenberg	QB	Iowa	3 years / $1.49 million	August 26, 2013
April 30, 2013	Camden Wentz	C	N.C. State	3 years / $1.49 million	August 26, 2013
April 30, 2013	Jerodis Williams	RB	Furman	3 years / $1.49 million	August 26, 2013
April 30, 2013	Nathan Williams	LB	Ohio State	3 years / $1.49 million	August 6, 2013
May 6, 2013	Adam Thielen	WR	Minnesota State-Mankato	3 years / $1.49 million	August 31, 2013^{[PS]}
May 6, 2013	Brandon Keith	OT	Arizona Cardinals (2011)	1 year / $715,000	August 31, 2013^{[PS]}
May 29, 2013	Stanford Keglar	LB	Las Vegas Locomotives (UFL)	1 year / $630,000	June 27, 2013
August 6, 2013	Stanford Keglar	LB	Las Vegas Locomotives (UFL)		August 26, 2013
August 20, 2013	Spencer Nealy	DE	Detroit Lions		August 31, 2013
September 2, 2013	Tristan Okpalaugo	DE	Miami Dolphins	^{[PS]}	September 10, 2013
September 4, 2013	Bradley Randle	RB	Minnesota Vikings (re-signed)	^{[PS]}	September 10, 2013
September 10, 2013	Joe Banyard	RB	Minnesota Vikings (re-signed)	^{[PS]}	December 16, 2013
September 11, 2013	Robert Steeples	CB	Miami Dolphins	^{[PS]}	December 21, 2013
October 9, 2013	Justin Trattou	DE	New York Giants		October 26, 2013
October 18, 2013	Jacob Lacey	CB	Minnesota Vikings (re-signed)		October 22, 2013
October 29, 2013	Justin Trattou	DE	Minnesota Vikings (re-signed)		November 2, 2013
November 12, 2013	Spencer Nealy	DE	Minnesota Vikings (re-signed)	^{[PS]}	December 10, 2013
November 13, 2013	Jamaal Johnson-Webb	OT	Chicago Bears	^{[PS]}	November 26, 2013
November 25, 2013	Mike Remmers	OT	San Diego Chargers		December 14, 2013

== Preseason ==
=== Schedule ===
The Vikings' preseason opponents and schedule were announced on April 4, 2013. Their preseason began with a loss to the Houston Texans at Mall of America Field on August 9, followed by road defeats against the Buffalo Bills and the San Francisco 49ers; the game against the 49ers was the Vikings' second preseason matchup against the same opposition in two years. The preseason program concluded on a positive note – a home victory against the Tennessee Titans on August 29.

Week	Date	Opponent	Result	Record	Venue	Attendance	NFL.com recap
1	August 9	Houston Texans	L 13–27	0–1	Mall of America Field	62,306	Recap
2	August 16	at Buffalo Bills	L 16–20	0–2	Ralph Wilson Stadium	60,164	Recap
3	August 25	at San Francisco 49ers	L 14–34	0–3	Candlestick Park	69,732	Recap
4	August 29	Tennessee Titans	W 24–23	1–3	Mall of America Field	62,603	Recap

=== Game summaries ===
==== Week 1: vs. Houston Texans ====
Preseason Week 1: Houston Texans at Minnesota Vikings – Game summary

Quarter	1	2	3	4	Total
Texans	3	7	3	14	27
Vikings	3	10	0	0	13

at Mall of America Field at Hubert H. Humphrey Metrodome, Minneapolis, Minnesota

- Date: August 9
- Game time: 7:00 p.m.
- Game weather: None (indoor stadium)
- Game attendance: 62,306
- Referee: Pete Morelli (135)
- TV announcers (KARE-11): Paul Allen, Pete Bercich, Greg Coleman and Ben Leber
- Recap, Game Book

Game information

First quarter

- HOU – Randy Bullock 48-yard field goal, 10:56. Texans 3–0. Drive: 7 plays, 36 yards, 3:15.
- MIN – Blair Walsh 22-yard field goal, 5:50. Tied 3–3. Drive: 6 plays, 59 yards, 2:26.

Second quarter

- MIN – Zach Line 61-yard pass from Matt Cassel (Blair Walsh kick), 12:26. Vikings 10–3. Drive: 5 plays, 94 yards, 2:34.
- HOU – DeAndre Hopkins 34-yard pass from T. J. Yates (Randy Bullock kick), 6:24. Tied 10–10. Drive: 12 plays, 85 yards, 6:02.
- MIN – Blair Walsh 33-yard field goal, 1:19. Vikings 13–10. Drive: 5 plays, 32 yards, 0:53.

Third quarter

- HOU – Randy Bullock 21-yard field goal, 4:28. Tied 13–13. Drive: 15 plays, 90 yards, 6:33.

Fourth quarter

- HOU – Lestar Jean 2-yard pass from Case Keenum (Randy Bullock kick), 10:26. Texans 20–13. Drive: 9 plays, 72 yards, 5:18.
- HOU – Ray Graham 5-yard run (Randy Bullock kick), 4:31. Texans 27–13. Drive: 7 plays, 42 yards, 3:59.

Top passers

- HOU – T. J. Yates – 13/21, 151 yards, TD
- MIN – Matt Cassel – 12/19, 212 yards, TD, INT

Top rushers

- HOU – Cierre Wood – 10 rushes, 59 yards
- MIN – Bradley Randle – 3 rushes, 16 yards

Top receivers

- HOU – DeAndre Hopkins – 4 receptions, 52 yards, TD
- MIN – Stephen Burton – 3 receptions, 67 yards

==== Week 2: at Buffalo Bills ====
Preseason Week 2: Minnesota Vikings at Buffalo Bills – Game summary

Quarter	1	2	3	4	Total
Vikings	3	0	0	13	16
Bills	0	13	7	0	20

at Ralph Wilson Stadium, Orchard Park, New York

- Date: August 16
- Game time: 6:00 p.m.
- Game weather: Sunny, 73 °F (23 °C)
- Game attendance: 60,164
- Referee: Tony Corrente (99)
- TV announcers (KARE-11): Paul Allen, Pete Bercich, Greg Coleman and Ben Leber
- Recap, Game Book

Game information

First quarter

- MIN – Blair Walsh 36-yard field goal, 0:05. Vikings 3–0. Drive: 12 plays, 62 yards, 5:51.

Second quarter

- BUF – Jamie Blatnick fumble recovery in end zone (Dustin Hopkins kick), 8:45. Bills 7–3.
- BUF – Dustin Hopkins 39-yard field goal, 1:12. Bills 10–3. Drive: 15 plays, 59 yards, 5:19.
- BUF – Dustin Hopkins 35-yard field goal, 0:00. Bills 13–3. Drive: 7 plays, 52 yards, 0:38.

Third quarter

- BUF – Brad Smith 4-yard pass from EJ Manuel (Rian Lindell kick), 9:58. Bills 20–3. Drive: 14 plays, 80 yards, 5:02.

Fourth quarter

- MIN – Joe Banyard 1-yard run (Blair Walsh kick), 9:18. Bills 20–10. Drive: 11 plays, 64 yards, 5:30.
- MIN – Rodney Smith 35-yard pass from McLeod Bethel-Thompson (pass failed), 4:36. Bills 20–16. Drive: 8 plays, 72 yards, 3:11.

Top passers

- MIN – McLeod Bethel-Thompson – 10/17, 107 yards, TD
- BUF – Kevin Kolb – 13/21, 111 yards, INT

Top rushers

- MIN – Joe Banyard – 7 rushes, 47 yards, TD
- BUF – Tashard Choice – 12 rushes, 54 yards

Top receivers

- MIN – Kyle Rudolph – 3 receptions, 39 yards
- BUF – Marcus Easley – 3 receptions, 46 yards

==== Week 3: at San Francisco 49ers ====
Preseason Week 3: Minnesota Vikings at San Francisco 49ers – Game summary

Quarter	1	2	3	4	Total
Vikings	0	7	7	0	14
49ers	10	10	0	14	34

at Candlestick Park, San Francisco, California

- Date: August 25
- Game time: 7:00 p.m.
- Game weather: Cloudy, 70 °F (21 °C)
- Game attendance: 69,732
- Referee: Carl Cheffers (51)
- TV announcers (NBC): Al Michaels, Cris Collinsworth and Michele Tafoya
- Recap, Game Book

Game information

First quarter

- SF – Phil Dawson 30-yard field goal, 12:56. 49ers 3–0. Drive: 4 plays, −1 yard, 1:01.
- SF – Quinton Patton 5-yard pass from Colin Kaepernick (Phil Dawson kick), 2:39. 49ers 10–0. Drive: 11 plays, 84 yards, 5:38.

Second quarter

- MIN – Zach Line 1-yard pass from Christian Ponder (Blair Walsh kick), 3:00. 49ers 10–7. Drive: 5 plays, 28 yards, 2:18.
- SF – Lavelle Hawkins 105-yard kickoff return (Phil Dawson kick), 2:45. 49ers 17–7. Drive: 0 plays, 0 yards, 0:15.
- SF – Phil Dawson 50-yard field goal, 0:27. 49ers 20–7. Drive: 7 plays, 12 yards, 1:41.

Third quarter

- MIN – Joe Webb 3-yard pass from Christian Ponder (Blair Walsh kick), 4:05. 49ers 20–14. Drive: 12 plays, 78 yards, 5:35.

Fourth quarter

- SF – Jewel Hampton 4-yard run (Phil Dawson kick), 14:55. 49ers 27–14. Drive: 9 plays, 91 yards, 4:10.
- SF – Anthony Dixon 1-yard run (Phil Dawson kick), 4:12. 49ers 34–14. Drive: 15 plays, 63 yards, 8:09.

Top passers

- MIN – Christian Ponder – 17/23, 116 yards, 2 TD, INT
- SF – Colt McCoy – 11/15, 109 yards, INT

Top rushers

- MIN – Toby Gerhart – 7 rushes, 20 yards
- SF – Jewel Hampton – 8 rushes, 45 yards, TD

Top receivers

- MIN – Stephen Burton – 3 receptions, 31 yards
- SF – Quinton Patton – 4 receptions, 35 yards, TD

==== Week 4: vs. Tennessee Titans ====
Preseason Week 4: Tennessee Titans at Minnesota Vikings – Game summary

Quarter	1	2	3	4	Total
Titans	3	14	3	3	23
Vikings	0	14	7	3	24

at Mall of America Field at Hubert H. Humphrey Metrodome, Minneapolis, Minnesota

- Date: August 29
- Game time: 7:00 p.m.
- Game weather: None (indoor stadium)
- Game attendance: 62,603
- Referee: Clete Blakeman (34)
- TV announcers (KARE-11): Paul Allen, Pete Bercich, Greg Coleman and Ben Leber
- Recap, Game Book

Game information

First quarter

- TEN – Rob Bironas 28-yard field goal, 6:01. Titans 3–0. Drive: 18 plays, 70 yards, 8:59.

Second quarter

- MIN – Matt Asiata 1-yard run (Blair Walsh kick), 14:57. Vikings 7–3. Drive: 11 plays, 80 yards, 6:04.
- TEN – Justin Hunter 17-yard pass from Ryan Fitzpatrick (Rob Bironas kick), 7:35. Titans 10–7. Drive: 12 plays, 80 yards, 7:22.
- MIN – Joe Banyard 11-yard pass from McLeod Bethel-Thompson (Blair Walsh kick), 2:29. Vikings 14–10. Drive: 13 plays, 80 yards, 5:06.
- TEN – Jack Doyle 2-yard pass from Rusty Smith (Rob Bironas kick), 0:26. Titans 17–14. Drive: 10 plays, 80 yards, 2:03.

Third quarter

- MIN – Marcus Sherels 109-yard kickoff return (Blair Walsh kick), 14:48. Vikings 21–17. Drive: 0 plays, 0 yards, 0:12.
- TEN – Rob Bironas 29-yard field goal, 3:20. Vikings 21–20. Drive: 10 plays, 50 yards, 4:59.

Fourth quarter

- TEN – Rob Bironas 24-yard field goal, 12:53. Titans 23–21. Drive: 10 plays, 83 yards, 3:49.
- MIN – Blair Walsh 25-yard field goal, 1:38. Vikings 24–23. Drive: 8 plays, 71 yards, 2:17.

Top passers

- TEN – Rusty Smith – 13/21, 178 yards, TD, INT
- MIN – McLeod Bethel-Thompson – 19/26, 187 yards, TD, INT

Top rushers

- TEN – Darius Reynaud – 11 rushes, 56 yards
- MIN – Joe Banyard – 13 rushes, 62 yards

Top receivers

- TEN – Rashad Ross – 2 receptions, 64 yards
- MIN – Joe Banyard – 7 receptions, 54 yards, TD

== Regular season ==
=== Schedule ===
Week	Date	Opponent	Result	Record	Venue	Attendance	NFL.com recap
1	September 8	at **Detroit Lions**	**L** 24–34	0–1	Ford Field	62,461	Recap
2	September 15	at **Chicago Bears**	**L** 30–31	0–2	Soldier Field	62,181	Recap
3	September 22	Cleveland Browns	**L** 27–31	0–3	Mall of America Field	63,672	Recap
4	September 29	Pittsburgh Steelers	**W** 34–27	1–3	Wembley Stadium (London, UK)	83,518	Recap
5	Bye						
6	October 13	Carolina Panthers	**L** 10–35	1–4	Mall of America Field	63,963	Recap
7	October 21	at New York Giants	**L** 7–23	1–5	MetLife Stadium	79,314	Recap
8	October 27	**Green Bay Packers**	**L** 31–44	1–6	Mall of America Field	64,134	Recap
9	November 3	at Dallas Cowboys	**L** 23–27	1–7	AT&T Stadium	85,360	Recap
10	November 7	Washington Redskins	**W** 34–27	2–7	Mall of America Field	64,011	Recap
11	November 17	at Seattle Seahawks	**L** 20–41	2–8	CenturyLink Field	68,235	Recap
12	November 24	at **Green Bay Packers**	**T** 26–26 (OT)	2–8–1	Lambeau Field	77,871	Recap
13	December 1	**Chicago Bears**	**W** 23–20 (OT)	3–8–1	Mall of America Field	64,134	Recap
14	December 8	at Baltimore Ravens	**L** 26–29	3–9–1	M&T Bank Stadium	70,921	Recap
15	December 15	Philadelphia Eagles	**W** 48–30	4–9–1	Mall of America Field	64,087	Recap
16	December 22	at Cincinnati Bengals	**L** 14–42	4–10–1	Paul Brown Stadium	61,555	Recap
17	December 29	**Detroit Lions**	**W** 14–13	5–10–1	Mall of America Field	64,134	Recap

Team names in bold indicate the Vikings' divisional opponents.
# Blue/red indicates the International Series game in London.

=== Game summaries ===
==== Week 1: at Detroit Lions ====
Week 1: Minnesota Vikings at Detroit Lions – Game summary

Quarter	1	2	3	4	Total
Vikings	7	7	10	0	**24**
**Lions**	3	10	14	7	**34**

at Ford Field, Detroit, Michigan

- Date: September 8
- Game time: 1:00 p.m. EDT/12:00 p.m. CDT
- Game weather: None (indoor stadium)
- Game attendance: 62,461
- Referee: John Parry (132)
- TV announcers (Fox): Thom Brennaman, Brian Billick and Laura Okmin
- Recap, Game Book

Game information

**First quarter**

- MIN – Adrian Peterson 78-yard run (Blair Walsh kick), 10:39. Vikings 7–0. **Drive: 1 play, 78 yards, 0:13.**
- DET – David Akers 33-yard field goal, 4:55. Vikings 7–3. **Drive: 10 plays, 65 yards, 5:44.**

**Second quarter**

- DET – David Akers 42-yard field goal, 14:47. Vikings 7–6. **Drive: 7 plays, 25 yards, 3:08.**
- MIN – Adrian Peterson 4-yard run (Blair Walsh kick), 12:17. Vikings 14–6. **Drive: 4 plays, 65 yards, 1:36.**
- DET – Joique Bell 2-yard run (David Akers kick), 0:10. Vikings 14–13. **Drive: 8 plays, 70 yards, 2:04.**

**Third quarter**

- DET – Joique Bell 1-yard run (David Akers kick), 10:19. Lions 20–14. **Drive: 7 plays, 50 yards, 2:44.**
- MIN – Blair Walsh 52-yard field goal, 6:42. Lions 20–17. **Drive: 7 plays, 46 yards, 3:37.**
- DET – Reggie Bush 77-yard pass from Matthew Stafford (David Akers kick), 5:45. Lions 27–17. **Drive: 3 plays, 80 yards, 0:57.**
- MIN – Adrian Peterson 4-yard pass from Christian Ponder (Blair Walsh kick), 1:37. Lions 27–24. **Drive: 8 plays, 78 yards, 4:08.**

**Fourth quarter**

- DET – Joseph Fauria 1-yard pass from Matthew Stafford (David Akers kick), 6:47. Lions 34–24. **Drive: 8 plays, 39 yards, 4:36.**

**Top passers**

- MIN – Christian Ponder – 18/28, 236 yards, TD, 3 INT
- DET – Matthew Stafford – 28/43, 357 yards, 2 TD, INT

**Top rushers**

- MIN – Adrian Peterson – 18 rushes, 93 yards, 2 TD
- DET – Reggie Bush – 21 rushes, 90 yards

**Top receivers**

- MIN – Jerome Simpson – 7 receptions, 140 yards
- DET – Reggie Bush – 4 receptions, 101 yards, TD

==== Week 2: at Chicago Bears ====
Week 2: Minnesota Vikings at Chicago Bears – Game summary

Quarter	1	2	3	4	Total
Vikings	7	14	3	6	**30**
**Bears**	14	10	0	7	**31**

at Soldier Field, Chicago, Illinois

- Date: September 15
- Game time: 12:00 p.m. CDT
- Game weather: Rain, 60 °F (16 °C)
- Game attendance: 62,181
- Referee: Ed Hochuli (85)
- TV announcers (Fox): Thom Brennaman, Brian Billick and Laura Okmin
- Recap, Game Book

Game information

**First quarter**

- MIN – Cordarrelle Patterson 105-yard kickoff return (Blair Walsh kick), 14:47. Vikings 7–0. **Drive: 0 plays, 0 yards, 0:13.**
- CHI – Martellus Bennett 1-yard pass from Jay Cutler (Robbie Gould kick), 12:12. Tied 7–7. **Drive: 5 plays, 32 yards, 2:35.**
- CHI – Brandon Marshall 34-yard pass from Jay Cutler (Robbie Gould kick), 1:04. Bears 14–7. **Drive: 3 plays, 86 yards, 1:06.**

**Second quarter**

- MIN – Brian Robison 61-yard fumble return (Blair Walsh kick), 7:34. Tied 14–14.
- CHI – Tim Jennings 44-yard interception return (Robbie Gould kick), 2:51. Bears 21–14.
- MIN – Kyle Rudolph 20-yard pass from Christian Ponder (Blair Walsh kick), 1:11. Tied 21–21. **Drive: 6 plays, 75 yards, 1:40.**
- CHI – Robbie Gould 20-yard field goal, 0:00. Bears 24–21. **Drive: 9 plays, 78 yards, 1:11.**

**Third quarter**

- MIN – Blair Walsh 28-yard field goal, 2:32. Tied 24–24. **Drive: 13 plays, 81 yards, 5:45.**

**Fourth quarter**

- MIN – Blair Walsh 28-yard field goal, 8:05. Vikings 27–24. **Drive: 13 plays, 79 yards, 6:49.**
- MIN – Blair Walsh 22-yard field goal, 3:15. Vikings 30–24. **Drive: 8 plays, 43 yards, 3:13.**
- CHI – Martellus Bennett 16-yard pass from Jay Cutler (Robbie Gould kick), 0:10. Bears 31–30. **Drive: 10 plays, 66 yards, 3:05.**

**Top passers**

- MIN – Christian Ponder – 16/30, 227 yards, TD, INT
- CHI – Jay Cutler – 28/39, 290 yards, 3 TD, 2 INT

**Top rushers**

- MIN – Adrian Peterson – 26 rushes, 100 yards
- CHI – Matt Forté – 19 rushes, 90 yards

**Top receivers**

- MIN – Greg Jennings – 5 receptions, 84 yards
- CHI – Brandon Marshall – 7 receptions, 113 yards, TD

==== Week 3: vs. Cleveland Browns ====
Week 3: Cleveland Browns at Minnesota Vikings – Game summary

Quarter	1	2	3	4	Total
**Browns**	7	17	0	7	**31**
Vikings	7	10	7	3	**27**

at Mall of America Field at the Hubert H. Humphrey Metrodome, Minneapolis, Minnesota

- Date: September 22
- Game time: 12:00 p.m. CDT
- Game weather: None (indoor stadium)
- Game attendance: 63,672
- Referee: Bill Leavy (127)
- TV announcers (CBS): Kevin Harlan and Solomon Wilcots
- Recap, Game Book

Game information

**First quarter**

- MIN – Adrian Peterson 2-yard run (Blair Walsh kick), 9:13. Vikings 7–0. **Drive: 11 plays, 80 yards, 5:47.**
- CLE – Josh Gordon 47-yard pass from Brian Hoyer (Billy Cundiff kick), 4:42. Tied 7–7. **Drive: 6 plays, 68 yards, 2:13.**

**Second quarter**

- CLE – Jordan Cameron 19-yard pass from Brian Hoyer (Billy Cundiff kick), 14:55. Browns 14–7. **Drive: 7 plays, 82 yards, 3:26.**
- MIN – Christian Ponder 6-yard run (Blair Walsh kick), 4:43. Tied 14–14. **Drive: 9 plays, 80 yards, 4:43.**
- CLE – Billy Cundiff 38-yard field goal, 6:07. Browns 17–14. **Drive: 9 plays, 60 yards, 4:05.**
- CLE – Jordan Cameron 11-yard pass from Spencer Lanning (Billy Cundiff kick), 3:39. Browns 24–14. **Drive: 6 plays, 38 yards, 1:33.**
- MIN – Blair Walsh 43-yard field goal, 1:08. Browns 24–17. **Drive: 4 plays, 1 yard, 1:20.**

**Third quarter**

- MIN – Christian Ponder 8-yard run (Blair Walsh kick), 2:36. Tied 24–24. **Drive: 3 plays, 9 yards, 0:49.**

**Fourth quarter**

- MIN – Blair Walsh 30-yard field goal, 10:47. Vikings 27–24. **Drive: 13 plays, 60 yards, 5:14.**
- CLE – Jordan Cameron 7-yard pass from Brian Hoyer (Spencer Lanning kick), 0:51. Browns 31–27. **Drive: 11 plays, 55 yards, 2:30.**

**Top passers**

- CLE – Brian Hoyer – 30/54, 321 yards, 3 TD, 3 INT
- MIN – Christian Ponder – 25/42, 228 yards, INT

**Top rushers**

- CLE – Josh Aubrey – 1 rush, 34 yards
- MIN – Adrian Peterson – 25 rushes, 88 yards, TD

**Top receivers**

- CLE – Josh Gordon – 10 receptions, 146 yards, TD
- MIN – Cordarrelle Patterson – 2 receptions, 49 yards

==== Week 4: vs. Pittsburgh Steelers ====
NFL International Series

Week 4: Pittsburgh Steelers at Minnesota Vikings – Game summary

Quarter	1	2	3	4	Total
Steelers	7	3	7	10	**27**
**Vikings**	10	10	14	0	**34**

at Wembley Stadium, London, United Kingdom

- Date: September 29
- Game time: 6:00 p.m. BST/12:00 p.m. CDT
- Game weather: Partly cloudy, 54 °F (12 °C)
- Game attendance: 83,518
- Referee: Clete Blakeman (34)
- TV announcers (CBS): Jim Nantz and Phil Simms
- Recap, Game Book

Game information

**First quarter**

- MIN – Blair Walsh 54-yard field goal, 12:08. Vikings 3–0. **Drive: 9 plays, 47 yards, 2:52.**
- MIN – Greg Jennings 70-yard pass from Matt Cassel (Blair Walsh kick), 8:06. Vikings 10–0. **Drive: 3 plays, 76 yards, 0:56.**
- PIT – Le'Veon Bell 8-yard run (Shaun Suisham kick), 4:02. Vikings 10–7. **Drive: 8 plays, 75 yards, 4:04.**

**Second quarter**

- MIN – Adrian Peterson 60-yard run (Blair Walsh kick), 12:42. Vikings 17–7. **Drive: 1 play, 60 yards, 0:10.**
- PIT – Shaun Suisham 26-yard field goal, 3:39. Vikings 17–10. **Drive: 15 plays, 78 yards, 9:03.**
- MIN – Blair Walsh 37-yard field goal, 0:39. Vikings 20–10. **Drive: 8 plays, 47 yards, 3:00.**

**Third quarter**

- PIT – Le'Veon Bell 1-yard run (Shaun Suisham kick), 11:28. Vikings 20–17. **Drive: 6 plays, 80 yards, 3:32.**
- MIN – Adrian Peterson 7-yard run (Blair Walsh kick), 7:52. Vikings 27–17. **Drive: 6 plays, 75 yards, 3:36.**
- MIN – Greg Jennings 16-yard pass from Matt Cassel (Blair Walsh kick), 5:11. Vikings 34–17. **Drive: 2 plays, 37 yards, 0:27.**

**Fourth quarter**

- PIT – Jerricho Cotchery 15-yard pass from Ben Roethlisberger (Shaun Suisham kick), 12:42. Vikings 34–24. **Drive: 9 plays, 77 yards, 3:13.**
- PIT – Shaun Suisham 28-yard field goal, 3:37. Vikings 34–27. **Drive: 9 plays, 54 yards, 3:12.**

**Top passers**

- PIT – Ben Roethlisberger – 36/51, 383 yards, TD, INT
- MIN – Matt Cassel – 16/25, 248 yards, 2 TD

**Top rushers**

- PIT – Le'Veon Bell – 16 rushes, 57 yards, 2 TD
- MIN – Adrian Peterson – 23 rushes, 140 yards, 2 TD

**Top receivers**

- PIT – Jerricho Cotchery – 5 receptions, 103 yards, TD
- MIN – Jerome Simpson – 7 receptions, 124 yards

==== Week 6: vs. Carolina Panthers ====
Week 6: Carolina Panthers at Minnesota Vikings – Game summary

Quarter	1	2	3	4	Total
**Panthers**	7	7	14	7	**35**
Vikings	0	3	0	7	**10**

at Mall of America Field at the Hubert H. Humphrey Metrodome, Minneapolis, Minnesota

- Date: October 13
- Game time: 12:00 p.m. CDT
- Game weather: None (indoor stadium)
- Game attendance: 63,963
- Referee: Ron Winter (14)
- TV announcers (Fox): Sam Rosen, Brian Billick and Laura Okmin
- Recap, Game book

Game information

**First quarter**

- CAR – Steve Smith 2-yard pass from Cam Newton (Graham Gano kick), 2:03. Panthers 7–0. **Drive: 15 plays, 62 yards, 9:29.**

**Second quarter**

- CAR – Mike Tolbert 10-yard pass from Cam Newton (Graham Gano kick), 3:43. Panthers 14–0. **Drive: 14 plays, 82 yards, 6:34.**
- MIN – Blair Walsh 22-yard field goal, 0:14. Panthers 14–3. **Drive: 15 plays, 76 yards, 3:29.**

**Third quarter**

- CAR – Brandon LaFell 79-yard pass from Cam Newton (Graham Gano kick), 13:56. Panthers 21–3. **Drive: 3 plays, 86 yards, 1:04.**
- CAR – Cam Newton 7-yard run (Graham Gano kick), 6:10. Panthers 28–3. **Drive: 10 plays, 53 yards, 5:50.**

**Fourth quarter**

- CAR – Mike Tolbert 1-yard run (Graham Gano kick), 7:40. Panthers 35–3. **Drive: 5 plays, 21 yards, 3:02.**
- MIN – Kyle Rudolph 23-yard pass from Matt Cassel (Blair Walsh kick), 1:00. Panthers 35–10. **Drive: 11 plays, 89 yards, 2:38.**

**Top passers**

- CAR – Cam Newton – 20/26, 242 yards, 3 TD
- MIN – Matt Cassel – 32/44, 241 yards, TD, 2 INT

**Top rushers**

- CAR – DeAngelo Williams – 17 rushes, 64 yards
- MIN – Adrian Peterson – 10 rushes, 62 yards

**Top receivers**

- CAR – Brandon LaFell – 4 receptions, 107 yards, TD
- MIN – Kyle Rudolph – 9 receptions, 97 yards, TD

==== Week 7: at New York Giants ====
Week 7: Minnesota Vikings at New York Giants – Game summary

Quarter	1	2	3	4	Total
Vikings	7	0	0	0	**7**
**Giants**	3	7	7	6	**23**

at MetLife Stadium, East Rutherford, New Jersey

- Date: October 21
- Game time: 8:40 p.m. EDT/7:40 p.m. CDT
- Game weather: Partly cloudy, 57 °F (14 °C)
- Game attendance: 79,314
- Referee: Tony Corrente (99)
- TV announcers (ESPN^{[a]}): Mike Tirico, Jon Gruden and Lisa Salters
- Recap, Game book

Game information

**First quarter**

- NYG – Josh Brown 35-yard field goal, 5:24. Giants 3–0. **Drive: 17 plays, 68 yards, 9:36.**
- MIN – Marcus Sherels 86-yard punt return (Blair Walsh kick), 0:23. Vikings 7–3.

**Second quarter**

- NYG – Rueben Randle 24-yard pass from Eli Manning (Josh Brown kick), 9:33. Giants 10–7. **Drive: 7 plays, 82 yards, 3:34.**

**Third quarter**

- NYG – Peyton Hillis 1-yard run (Josh Brown kick), 8:37. Giants 17–7. **Drive: 2 plays, 3 yards, 0:41.**

**Fourth quarter**

- NYG – Josh Brown 23-yard field goal, 12:13. Giants 20–7. **Drive: 16 plays, 75 yards, 8:31.**
- NYG – Josh Brown 36-yard field goal, 11:03. Giants 23–7. **Drive: 4 plays, 0 yards, 1:00.**

**Top passers**

- MIN – Josh Freeman – 20/53, 190 yards, INT
- NYG – Eli Manning – 23/39, 200 yards, TD

**Top rushers**

- MIN – Adrian Peterson – 13 rushes, 28 yards
- NYG – Peyton Hillis – 18 rushes, 36 yards, TD

**Top receivers**

- MIN – Greg Jennings – 4 receptions, 41 yards
- NYG – Victor Cruz – 5 receptions, 50 yards

==== Week 8: vs. Green Bay Packers ====
Week 8: Green Bay Packers at Minnesota Vikings – Game summary

Quarter	1	2	3	4	Total
**Packers**	7	17	7	13	**44**
Vikings	7	10	0	14	**31**

at Mall of America Field at the Hubert H. Humphrey Metrodome, Minneapolis, Minnesota

- Date: October 27
- Game time: 7:30 p.m. CDT
- Game weather: None (indoor stadium)
- Game attendance: 64,134
- Referee: Scott Green (19)
- TV announcers (NBC): Al Michaels, Cris Collinsworth and Michele Tafoya
- Recap, Game book

Game information

**First quarter**

- MIN – Cordarrelle Patterson 109-yard kickoff return (Blair Walsh kick), 14:47. Vikings 7–0. **Drive: 0 plays, 0 yards, 0:13.**
- GB – Jordy Nelson 11-yard pass from Aaron Rodgers (Mason Crosby kick), 7:23. Tied 7–7. **Drive: 14 plays, 90 yards, 7:24.**

**Second quarter**

- GB – Mason Crosby 30-yard field goal, 10:29. Packers 10–7. **Drive: 17 plays, 70 yards, 8:24.**
- MIN – Blair Walsh 36-yard field goal, 5:09. Tied 10–10. **Drive: 11 plays, 62 yards, 5:20.**
- GB – Jordy Nelson 76-yard pass from Aaron Rodgers (Mason Crosby kick), 3:38. Packers 17–10. **Drive: 3 plays, 80 yards, 1:31.**
- GB – Micah Hyde 93-yard punt return (Mason Crosby kick), 1:30. Packers 24–10.
- MIN – Adrian Peterson 8-yard run (Blair Walsh kick), 0:04. Packers 24–17. **Drive: 8 plays, 77 yards, 1:26.**

**Third quarter**

- GB – Eddie Lacy 1-yard run (Mason Crosby kick), 6:50. Packers 31–17. **Drive: 15 plays, 80 yards, 8:10.**

**Fourth quarter**

- GB – James Starks 25-yard run (Mason Crosby kick), 14:16. Packers 38–17. **Drive: 9 plays, 74 yards, 5:32.**
- GB – Mason Crosby 20-yard field goal, 6:10. Packers 41–17. **Drive: 10 plays, 53 yards, 6:36.**
- MIN – Toby Gerhart 13-yard run (Blair Walsh kick), 4:42. Packers 41–24. **Drive: 5 plays, 58 yards, 1:28.**
- GB – Mason Crosby 45-yard field goal, 2:53. Packers 44–24. **Drive: 6 plays, 16 yards, 1:49.**
- MIN – Christian Ponder 19-yard run (Blair Walsh kick), 1:24. Packers 44–31. **Drive: 5 plays, 73 yards, 1:29.**

**Top passers**

- GB – Aaron Rodgers – 24/29, 285 yards, 2 TD
- MIN – Christian Ponder – 14/21, 145 yards

**Top rushers**

- GB – Eddie Lacy – 29 rushes, 94 yards, TD
- MIN – Adrian Peterson – 13 rushes, 60 yards, TD

**Top receivers**

- GB – Jordy Nelson – 7 receptions, 123 yards, 2 TD
- MIN – Kyle Rudolph – 4 receptions, 51 yards

With Josh Freeman ruled out after suffering a concussion in the previous game, Christian Ponder reclaimed his spot as starting quarterback. Cordarrelle Patterson got the game off to a good start for the Vikings, returning the opening kickoff 109 yards for a touchdown to tie the NFL record. However, Aaron Rodgers responded for the Packers by leading his offense on a 14-play, 90-yard drive, culminating in an 11-yard touchdown pass to Jordy Nelson. The sides then exchanged field goals before Rodgers found Nelson again in the second quarter for a 76-yard touchdown. On the Vikings' next possession, they were forced to punt, but Micah Hyde was able to return the kick 93 yards for another Packers touchdown to make the score 24–10. A controversial pass interference call against Packers cornerback Tramon Williams late in the half set the Vikings up with a first down on the Packers' 14-yard line; two plays later, Adrian Peterson had the ball in the end zone for an 8-yard touchdown, which kept the Vikings in with a chance going into the second half.

But the Packers offense remained unstoppable as Rodgers again led a long drive, capped by a 1-yard touchdown run from Eddie Lacy after they had converted three times on third down and once on fourth down during the series. After another three-and-out for the Vikings, the Packers offense picked up four first downs in the space of five plays on the way to a 25-yard touchdown run for James Starks. The Vikings again went three-and-out on their next possession, but this time their defense was able to stop Green Bay at the goal line, limiting them to a 20-yard Mason Crosby field goal to make the score 41–17 with just over six minutes to play. Patterson again had a big return on the ensuing kickoff, taking it 51 yards to the Minnesota 42-yard line to set up a short field. Five plays later, Toby Gerhart narrowed the deficit to 17 points with a 13-yard touchdown run. Vikings cornerback Josh Robinson was penalized on the onside kick that followed for touching the ball before it had gone 10 yards, allowing the Packers to run down the clock before Crosby slotted another field goal, this time from 45 yards. Inside the two-minute warning, Ponder threw an incompletion on fourth down, only for Tramon Williams to again be penalized for pass interference against Patterson, allowing Ponder the opportunity for a 19-yard touchdown run two plays later. The Vikings were unable to recover the onside kick, and Green Bay knelt out the clock for a 44–31 win.

==== Week 9: at Dallas Cowboys ====
Week 9: Minnesota Vikings at Dallas Cowboys – Game summary

Quarter	1	2	3	4	Total
Vikings	3	7	7	6	**23**
**Cowboys**	3	3	14	7	**27**

at AT&T Stadium, Arlington, Texas

- Date: November 3
- Game time: 12:00 p.m. CST
- Game weather: None (retractable roof closed)
- Game attendance: 85,360
- Referee: Jeff Triplette (42)
- TV announcers (Fox): Joe Buck, Troy Aikman and Pam Oliver
- Recap, Game book

Game information

**First quarter**

- DAL – Dan Bailey 41-yard field goal, 6:51. Cowboys 3–0. **Drive: 9 plays, 56 yards, 4:15.**
- MIN – Blair Walsh 23-yard field goal, 2:08. Tied 3–3. **Drive: 11 plays, 59 yards, 4:43.**

**Second quarter**

- DAL – Dan Bailey 44-yard field goal, 6:35. Cowboys 6–3. **Drive: 12 plays, 58 yards, 6:56.**
- MIN – Christian Ponder 6-yard run (Blair Walsh kick), 1:41. Vikings 10–6. **Drive: 11 plays, 79 yards, 4:54.**

**Third quarter**

- DAL – Jason Witten 26-yard pass from Tony Romo (Dan Bailey kick), 11:38. Cowboys 13–10. **Drive: 6 plays, 74 yards, 3:22.**
- DAL – Nick Hayden fumble recovery in end zone (Dan Bailey kick), 11:28. Cowboys 20–10.
- MIN – Kyle Rudolph 31-yard pass from Christian Ponder (Blair Walsh kick), 8:11. Cowboys 20–17. **Drive: 6 plays, 77 yards, 3:17.**

**Fourth quarter**

- MIN – Adrian Peterson 11-yard run (kick wide right), 5:40. Vikings 23–20. **Drive: 8 plays, 87 yards, 4:52.**
- DAL – Dwayne Harris 7-yard pass from Tony Romo (Dan Bailey kick), 0:35. Cowboys 27–23. **Drive: 9 plays, 90 yards, 2:09.**

**Top passers**

- MIN – Christian Ponder – 25/37, 236 yards, TD, INT
- DAL – Tony Romo – 34/51, 337 yards, 2 TD, INT

**Top rushers**

- MIN – Adrian Peterson – 25 rushes, 140 yards, TD
- DAL – DeMarco Murray – 4 rushes, 31 yards

**Top receivers**

- MIN – Greg Jennings – 6 receptions, 56 yards
- DAL – Jason Witten – 8 receptions, 102 yards, TD

Following the high-scoring loss to the Packers, the Vikings, continuing with Christian Ponder as their quarterback, travel to Arlington, Texas to face the Dallas Cowboys. The first quarter was all field goals, as Dallas scored first with a 41-yarder by Dan Bailey, followed by a 23-yarder for the Vikings by Blair Walsh. In the second quarter, Bailey made another field goal from 44 yards to put the Cowboys up by 3, but the Vikings took a 10–6 lead into halftime, capping the ensuing 79-yard drive with a 6-yard run by Ponder.

After the half, Cowboy quarterback Tony Romo completed two consecutive 26-yard passes to tight end Jason Witten to give them an early touchdown and restore their three-point lead. On the very next play from scrimmage, Ponder fumbled the ball as he was sacked in the end zone, and the Cowboys' Nick Hayden recovered it for a touchdown, meaning the Vikings went from 10–6 up to 20–10 down in the space of two scrimmage plays. The Vikings responded immediately with a quick, six-play drive, culminating with a 31-yard pass from Ponder to Kyle Rudolph to cut the Cowboys' lead back to three points.

After a series of punts going into the fourth quarter, Adrian Peterson scored for the Vikings with an 11-yard run with almost six minutes to go, but Walsh pushed the extra point kick wide right, giving the Vikings a three-point lead over the Cowboys. Vikings cornerback A. J. Jefferson intercepted Romo on the Cowboys' ensuing drive, putting the Vikings in a position to potentially take over the game, but the offense went three-and-out and was forced to punt. The Cowboys progressed downfield quickly, never faced with a third down, and scored with a 7-yard touchdown pass from Romo to Dwayne Harris, the third time the Vikings had given up a game-winning score in 2013. With less than 30 seconds to play, but they were unable to make any significant territorial gains and Ponder's last-second hail mary fell short, giving the Cowboys a 27–23 win.

==== Week 10: vs. Washington Redskins ====
Week 10: Washington Redskins at Minnesota Vikings – Game summary

Quarter	1	2	3	4	Total
Redskins	10	14	3	0	**27**
**Vikings**	7	7	14	6	**34**

at Mall of America Field at the Hubert H. Humphrey Metrodome, Minneapolis, Minnesota

- Date: November 7
- Game time: 7:25 p.m. CST
- Game weather: None (indoor stadium)
- Game attendance: 64,011
- Referee: Ed Hochuli (85)
- TV announcers (NFLN^{[b]}): Brad Nessler, Mike Mayock and Alex Flanagan
- Recap, Game book

Game information

**First quarter**

- WAS – Kai Forbath 20-yard field goal, 8:16. Redskins 3–0. **Drive: 11 plays, 50 yards, 4:53.**
- MIN – Adrian Peterson 18-yard run (Blair Walsh kick), 5:10. Vikings 7–3. **Drive: 6 plays, 65 yards, 3:06.**
- WAS – Pierre Garçon 8-yard pass from Robert Griffin III (Kai Forbath kick), 1:17. Redskins 10–7. **Drive: 7 plays, 78 yards, 3:53.**

**Second quarter**

- MIN – Cordarrelle Patterson 2-yard pass from Christian Ponder (Blair Walsh kick), 12:59. Vikings 14–10. **Drive: 8 plays, 73 yards, 3:18.**
- WAS – Jordan Reed 11-yard pass from Robert Griffin III (Kai Forbath kick), 5:02. Redskins 17–14. **Drive: 13 plays, 80 yards, 7:57.**
- WAS – Logan Paulsen 1-yard pass from Robert Griffin III (Kai Forbath kick), 0:10. Redskins 24–14. **Drive: 11 plays, 77 yards, 3:57.**

**Third quarter**

- WAS – Kai Forbath 40-yard field goal, 9:22. Redskins 27–14. **Drive: 12 plays, 59 yards, 5:38.**
- MIN – John Carlson 28-yard pass from Christian Ponder (Blair Walsh kick), 4:32. Redskins 27–21. **Drive: 9 plays, 74 yards, 4:50.**
- MIN – Adrian Peterson 1-yard run (Blair Walsh kick), 0:57. Vikings 28–27. **Drive: 5 plays, 41 yards, 2:00.**

**Fourth quarter**

- MIN – Blair Walsh 39-yard field goal, 9:54. Vikings 31–27. **Drive: 7 plays, 30 yards, 2:38.**
- MIN – Blair Walsh 40-yard field goal, 3:36. Vikings 34–27. **Drive: 10 plays, 40 yards, 4:47.**

**Top passers**

- WAS – Robert Griffin III – 24/37, 281 yards, 3 TD
- MIN – Christian Ponder – 17/21, 174 yards, 2 TD, INT

**Top rushers**

- WAS – Alfred Morris – 26 rushes, 139 yards
- MIN – Adrian Peterson – 20 rushes, 75 yards, 2 TD

**Top receivers**

- WAS – Pierre Garçon – 7 receptions, 119 yards, TD
- MIN – John Carlson – 7 receptions, 98 yards, TD

==== Week 11: at Seattle Seahawks ====
Week 11: Minnesota Vikings at Seattle Seahawks – Game summary

Quarter	1	2	3	4	Total
Vikings	3	10	0	7	**20**
**Seahawks**	10	14	0	17	**41**

at CenturyLink Field, Seattle, Washington

- Date: November 17
- Game time: 3:25 p.m. CST/1:25 p.m. PST
- Game weather: Sunny, 50 °F (10 °C)
- Game attendance: 68,235
- Referee: Jerome Boger (23)
- TV announcers (Fox): Chris Myers, Tim Ryan and Jennifer Hale
- Recap, Game book

Game information

**First quarter**

- SEA – Steven Hauschka 50-yard field goal, 11:25. Seahawks 3–0. **Drive: 5 plays, 1 yard, 2:04.**
- MIN – Blair Walsh 32-yard field goal, 4:40. Tied 3–3. **Drive: 13 plays, 66 yards, 6:45.**
- SEA – Marshawn Lynch 4-yard run (Steven Hauschka kick), 11:25. Seahawks 10–3. **Drive: 4 plays, 78 yards, 2:10.**

**Second quarter**

- MIN – Jarius Wright 38-yard pass from Christian Ponder (Blair Walsh kick), 11:28. Tied 10–10. **Drive: 6 plays, 80 yards, 3:32.**
- SEA – Marshawn Lynch 1-yard run (Steven Hauschka kick), 6:26. Seahawks 17–10. **Drive: 9 plays, 79 yards, 5:02.**
- MIN – Blair Walsh 45-yard field goal, 0:48. Seahawks 17–13. **Drive: 11 plays, 44 yards, 5:38.**
- SEA – Doug Baldwin 19-yard pass from Russell Wilson (Steven Hauschka kick), 0:10. Seahawks 24–13. **Drive: 5 plays, 46 yards, 0:38.**

**Third quarter**

- No scoring plays

**Fourth quarter**

- SEA – Marshawn Lynch 6-yard pass from Russell Wilson (Steven Hauschka kick), 13:14. Seahawks 31–13. **Drive: 2 plays, 18 yards, 0:39.**
- SEA – Walter Thurmond 29-yard interception return (Steven Hauschka kick), 12:30. Seahawks 38–13.
- SEA – Steven Hauschka 26-yard field goal, 10:12. Seahawks 41–13. **Drive: 4 plays, 7 yards, 1:28.**
- MIN – Jarius Wright 21-yard pass from Matt Cassel (Blair Walsh kick), 2:18. Seahawks 41–20. **Drive: 7 plays, 60 yards, 2:53.**

**Top passers**

- MIN – Christian Ponder – 13/22, 129 yards, TD, 2 INT
- SEA – Russell Wilson – 13/18, 230 yards, 2 TD

**Top rushers**

- MIN – Toby Gerhart – 7 rushes, 67 yards
- SEA – Marshawn Lynch – 17 rushes, 54 yards, 2 TD

**Top receivers**

- MIN – Jarius Wright – 3 receptions, 69 yards, 2 TD
- SEA – Zach Miller – 4 receptions, 69 yards

==== Week 12: at Green Bay Packers ====
Week 12: Minnesota Vikings at Green Bay Packers – Game summary

Quarter	1	2	3	4	OT	Total
Vikings	3	10	7	3	3	**26**
Packers	7	0	0	16	3	**26**

at Lambeau Field, Green Bay, Wisconsin

- Date: November 24
- Game time: 12:00 p.m. CST
- Game weather: Mostly cloudy, 19 °F (−7 °C)
- Game attendance: 77,871
- Referee: Bill Vinovich (52)
- TV announcers (Fox): Kevin Burkhardt, John Lynch and Erin Andrews
- Recap, Game book

Game information

**First quarter**

- GB – Scott Tolzien 6-yard run (Mason Crosby kick), 4:59. Packers 7–0. **Drive: 11 plays, 87 yards, 5:59.**
- MIN – Blair Walsh 36-yard field goal, 1:37. Packers 7–3. **Drive: 6 plays, 24 yards, 3:22.**

**Second quarter**

- MIN – Blair Walsh 47-yard field goal, 4:24. Packers 7–6. **Drive: 10 plays, 69 yards, 4:23.**
- MIN – Adrian Peterson 1-yard run (Blair Walsh kick), 0:50. Vikings 13–7. **Drive: 7 plays, 63 yards, 2:24.**

**Third quarter**

- MIN – Rhett Ellison 12-yard pass from Christian Ponder (Blair Walsh kick), 8:22. Vikings 20–7. **Drive: 6 plays, 59 yards, 3:28.**

**Fourth quarter**

- MIN – Blair Walsh 29-yard field goal, 14:22. Vikings 23–7. **Drive: 12 plays, 85 yards, 6:04.**
- GB – Eddie Lacy 3-yard run (pass failed), 11:42. Vikings 23–13. **Drive: 9 plays, 80 yards, 2:40.**
- GB – Jarrett Boykin 6-yard pass from Matt Flynn (Mason Crosby kick), 3:30. Vikings 23–20. **Drive: 12 plays, 76 yards, 5:10.**
- GB – Mason Crosby 27-yard field goal, 0:46. Tied 23–23. **Drive: 10 plays, 60 yards, 1:41.**

**Overtime**

- GB – Mason Crosby 20-yard field goal, 10:25. Packers 26–23. **Drive: 10 plays, 77 yards, 4:35.**
- MIN – Blair Walsh 35-yard field goal, 3:49. Tied 26–26. **Drive: 12 plays, 63 yards, 6:36.**

**Top passers**

- MIN – Christian Ponder – 21/30, 233 yards, TD
- GB – Matt Flynn – 21/36, 218 yards, TD

**Top rushers**

- MIN – Adrian Peterson – 32 rushes, 146 yards, TD
- GB – Eddie Lacy – 25 rushes, 110 yards, TD

**Top receivers**

- MIN – Jerome Simpson – 2 receptions, 54 yards
- GB – James Jones – 7 receptions, 80 yards

The Vikings traveled to Green Bay in week 12 to face a Packers team missing quarterback Aaron Rodgers, who had suffered a fractured left collarbone three weeks earlier. After successive punts from each side started the game, the Packers were the first to score as backup QB Scott Tolzien ran in for a 6-yard touchdown, but two field goals from Blair Walsh and a 1-yard touchdown run for Adrian Peterson meant the Vikings took a 13–7 lead into halftime. They extended their lead midway through the third quarter as Christian Ponder hit tight end Rhett Ellison for a 12-yard touchdown, and Walsh made it a 16-point lead with a 29-yard field goal on the second play of the fourth quarter.

The Packers pulled the struggling Tolzien after the Ellison touchdown and replaced him with the recently re-signed Matt Flynn. Flynn then led the Packers on three consecutive scoring drives in the fourth quarter, starting with a 3-yard touchdown run for Eddie Lacy. Flynn's pass to Andrew Quarless on the two-point attempt fell incomplete, but Flynn was able to find Jarrett Boykin for a 6-yard touchdown on the next drive to reduce the Vikings' lead to three points. Inside the two-minute warning, Flynn combined with James Jones for a 28-yard completion on 4th-and-6, setting up Mason Crosby for the game-tying, 27-yard field goal. The Packers won the overtime coin toss and took the opening possession down to the Minnesota 2-yard line before having to settle for a field goal, only for Walsh to respond with a 35-yard effort. The two sides then exchanged possession as neither was able to put together a significant drive and the game ended in a 26–26 tie.

==== Week 13: vs. Chicago Bears ====
Week 13: Chicago Bears at Minnesota Vikings – Game summary

Quarter	1	2	3	4	OT	Total
Bears	3	3	14	0	0	**20**
**Vikings**	0	7	3	10	3	**23**

at Mall of America Field at the Hubert H. Humphrey Metrodome, Minneapolis, Minnesota

- Date: December 1
- Game time: 12:00 p.m. CST
- Game weather: None (indoor stadium)
- Game attendance: 64,134
- Referee: Carl Cheffers (51)
- TV announcers (Fox): Thom Brennaman, Brian Billick and Laura Okmin
- Recap, Game book

Game information

**First quarter**

- CHI – Robbie Gould 30-yard field goal, 1:06. Bears 3–0. **Drive: 9 plays, 54 yards, 5:10.**

**Second quarter**

- MIN – Cordarrelle Patterson 33-yard run (Blair Walsh kick), 7:27. Vikings 7–3. **Drive: 5 plays, 90 yards, 2:33.**
- CHI – Robbie Gould 40-yard field goal, 2:47. Vikings 7–6. **Drive: 10 plays, 58 yards, 4:40.**

**Third quarter**

- CHI – Alshon Jeffery 80-yard pass from Josh McCown (Robbie Gould kick), 14:08. Bears 13–7. **Drive: 2 plays, 80 yards, 0:52.**
- MIN – Blair Walsh 32-yard field goal, 7:08. Bears 13–10. **Drive: 13 plays, 66 yards, 7:00.**
- CHI – Alshon Jeffery 46-yard pass from Josh McCown (Robbie Gould kick), 5:15. Bears 20–10. **Drive: 4 plays, 83 yards, 1:53.**

**Fourth quarter**

- MIN – Greg Jennings 8-yard pass from Matt Cassel (Blair Walsh kick), 7:41. Bears 20–17. **Drive: 13 plays, 89 yards, 6:25.**
- MIN – Blair Walsh 30-yard field goal, 0:20. Tied 20–20. **Drive: 12 plays, 79 yards, 2:20.**

**Overtime**

- MIN – Blair Walsh 34-yard field goal, 1:43. Vikings 23–20. **Drive: 7 plays, 47 yards, 2:24.**

**Top passers**

- CHI – Josh McCown – 23/36, 355 yards, 2 TD
- MIN – Matt Cassel – 20/33, 243 yards, TD, INT

**Top rushers**

- CHI – Matt Forte – 23 rushes, 120 yards
- MIN – Adrian Peterson – 35 rushes, 211 yards

**Top receivers**

- CHI – Alshon Jeffery – 12 receptions, 249 yards, 2 TD
- MIN – Greg Jennings – 7 receptions, 78 yards, TD

==== Week 14: at Baltimore Ravens ====
Week 14: Minnesota Vikings at Baltimore Ravens – Game summary

Quarter	1	2	3	4	Total
Vikings	0	3	3	20	**26**
**Ravens**	7	0	0	22	**29**

at M&T Bank Stadium, Baltimore, Maryland

- Date: December 8
- Game time: 1:00 p.m. EST/12:00 p.m. CST
- Game weather: Light snow, 33 °F (1 °C)
- Game attendance: 70,921
- Referee: Pete Morelli (135)
- TV announcers (Fox): Chris Myers, Tim Ryan and Jennifer Hale
- Recap, Game book

Game information

**First quarter**

- BAL – Ed Dickson 1-yard pass from Joe Flacco (Justin Tucker kick), 4:14. Ravens 7–0. **Drive: 4 plays, 25 yards, 2:15.**

**Second quarter**

- MIN – Blair Walsh 39-yard field goal, 4:28. Ravens 7–3. **Drive: 11 plays, 45 yards, 5:42.**

**Third quarter**

- MIN – Blair Walsh 40-yard field goal, 12:02. Ravens 7–6. **Drive: 8 plays, 38 yards, 2:58.**

**Fourth quarter**

- MIN – Jerome Simpson 8-yard pass from Matt Cassel (pass failed), 14:22. Vikings 12–7. **Drive: 5 plays, 33 yards, 1:40.**
- BAL – Dennis Pitta 1-yard pass from Joe Flacco (Joe Flacco–Torrey Smith pass), 2:05. Ravens 15–12. **Drive: 9 plays, 64 yards, 4:27.**
- MIN – Toby Gerhart 41-yard run (Blair Walsh kick), 1:27. Vikings 19–15. **Drive: 2 plays, 68 yards, 0:38.**
- BAL – Jacoby Jones 77-yard kickoff return (Justin Tucker kick), 1:16. Ravens 22–19. **Drive: 0 plays, 0 yards, 0:11.**
- MIN – Cordarrelle Patterson 79-yard pass from Matt Cassel (Blair Walsh kick), 0:45. Vikings 26–22. **Drive: 3 plays, 79 yards, 0:31.**
- BAL – Marlon Brown 9-yard pass form Joe Flacco (Justin Tucker kick), 0:04. Ravens 29–26. **Drive: 5 plays, 80 yards, 0:41.**

**Top passers**

- MIN – Matt Cassel – 17/38, 265 yards, 2 TD
- BAL – Joe Flacco – 28/50, 245 yards, 3 TD, 3 INT

**Top rushers**

- MIN – Toby Gerhart – 15 rushes, 89 yards, TD
- BAL – Ray Rice – 17 rushes, 67 yards

**Top receivers**

- MIN – Cordarrelle Patterson – 5 receptions, 141 yards, TD
- BAL – Marlon Brown – 7 receptions, 92 yards, TD

Playing in the snow in Baltimore, the Vikings sought out their first road win of the season. During the first half, Adrian Peterson injured his ankle and was dropped from the game. Despite taking the lead with a touchdown twice in the final 2 minutes of the fourth quarter, the Vikings were unable to hold on as the Ravens scored a game-winning touchdown with four seconds left. With the loss, the Vikings dropped to 3–9–1 and were officially eliminated from postseason contention.

==== Week 15: vs. Philadelphia Eagles ====
Week 15: Philadelphia Eagles at Minnesota Vikings – Game summary

Quarter	1	2	3	4	Total
Eagles	3	6	13	8	**30**
**Vikings**	7	10	10	21	**48**

at Mall of America Field at the Hubert H. Humphrey Metrodome, Minneapolis, Minnesota

- Date: December 15
- Game time: 12:00 p.m. CST
- Game weather: None (indoor stadium)
- Game attendance: 64,087
- Referee: Walt Anderson (66)
- TV announcers (Fox): Kenny Albert, Daryl Johnston and Tony Siragusa
- Recap, Game book

Game information

**First quarter**

- MIN – Greg Jennings 57-yard pass from Matt Cassel (Blair Walsh kick), 6:18. Vikings 7–0. **Drive: 4 plays, 91 yards, 2:04.**
- PHI – Alex Henery 35-yard field goal, 2:35. Vikings 7–3. **Drive: 9 plays, 63 yards, 3:43.**

**Second quarter**

- MIN – Blair Walsh 21-yard field goal, 13:19. Vikings 10–3. **Drive: 10 plays, 59 yards, 4:16.**
- PHI – Alex Henery 51-yard field goal, 8:55. Vikings 10–6. **Drive: 10 plays, 47 yards, 4:24.**
- MIN – Matt Asiata 1-yard run (Blair Walsh kick), 1:06. Vikings 17–6. **Drive: 16 plays, 75 yards, 7:49.**
- PHI – Alex Henery 33-yard field goal, 0:00. Vikings 17–9. **Drive: 8 plays, 66 yards, 1:06.**

**Third quarter**

- MIN – Matt Cassel 6-yard run (Blair Walsh kick), 12:03. Vikings 24–9. **Drive: 4 plays, 52 yards, 1:38.**
- MIN – Blair Walsh 38-yard field goal, 4:43. Vikings 27–9. **Drive: 4 plays, 4 yards, 1:21.**
- PHI – DeSean Jackson 30-yard pass from Nick Foles (Alex Henery kick), 3:14. Vikings 27–16. **Drive: 6 plays, 70 yards, 1:29.**
- PHI – Zach Ertz 3-yard pass from Nick Foles (pass failed), 0:15. Vikings 27–22. **Drive: 3 plays, 45 yards, 1:03.**

**Fourth quarter**

- MIN – Matt Asiata 1-yard run (Blair Walsh kick), 13:01. Vikings 34–22. **Drive: 6 plays, 54 yards, 2:14.**
- MIN – Cordarrelle Patterson 5-yard pass from Matt Cassel (Blair Walsh kick), 6:54. Vikings 41–22. **Drive: 3 plays, 36 yards, 1:01.**
- PHI – Jason Avant 16-yard pass from Nick Foles (Nick Foles–Riley Cooper pass), 4:26. Vikings 41–30. **Drive: 7 plays, 80 yards, 2:28.**
- MIN – Matt Asiata 5-yard run (Blair Walsh kick), 1:09. Vikings 48–30. **Drive: 8 plays, 48 yards, 3:17.**

**Top passers**

- PHI – Nick Foles – 30/48, 428 yards, 3 TD, INT
- MIN – Matt Cassel – 26/35, 382 yards, 2 TD, INT

**Top rushers**

- PHI – Nick Foles – 5 rushes, 41 yards
- MIN – Matt Asiata – 30 rushes, 51 yards, 3 TD

**Top receivers**

- PHI – DeSean Jackson – 10 receptions, 195 yards, TD
- MIN – Greg Jennings – 11 receptions, 163 yards, TD

==== Week 16: at Cincinnati Bengals ====
Week 16: Minnesota Vikings at Cincinnati Bengals – Game summary

Quarter	1	2	3	4	Total
Vikings	7	0	7	0	**14**
**Bengals**	14	14	14	0	**42**

at Paul Brown Stadium, Cincinnati, Ohio

- Date: December 22
- Game time: 1:00 p.m. EST/12:00 p.m. CST
- Game weather: Mostly cloudy, 53 °F (12 °C)
- Game attendance: 61,555
- Referee: Terry McAulay (77)
- TV announcers (Fox): Dick Stockton, Ronde Barber and Kris Budden
- Recap, Game book

Game information

**First quarter**

- CIN – Benjarvus Green-Ellis 4-yard run (Mike Nugent kick), 13:12. Bengals 7–0. **Drive: 2 plays, 4 yards, 0:12.**
- MIN – Jarius Wright 36-yard pass from Matt Cassel (Blair Walsh kick, 10:02. Tied 7–7. **Drive: 4 plays, 54 yards, 1:57.**
- CIN – A. J. Green 29-yard pass from Andy Dalton (Mike Nugent kick), 0:57. Bengals 14–7. **Drive: 10 plays, 90 yards, 5:21.**

**Second quarter**

- CIN – Vincent Rey 25-yard interception return (Mike Nugent kick), 10:02. Bengals 21–7.
- CIN – Jermaine Gresham 16-yard pass from Andy Dalton (Mike Nugent kick), 2:22. Bengals 28–7. **Drive: 8 plays, 44 yards, 3:09.**

**Third quarter**

- CIN – Mohamed Sanu 7-yard pass from Andy Dalton (Mike Nugent kick), 10:35. Bengals 35–7. **Drive: 8 plays, 80 yards, 4:25.**
- CIN – A. J. Green 2-yard pass from Andy Dalton (Mike Nugent kick), 3:19. Bengals 42–7. **Drive: 9 plays, 66 yards, 5:12.**
- MIN – Cordarrelle Patterson 35-yard run (Blair Walsh kick), 1:34. Bengals 42–14. **Drive: 5 plays, 67 yards, 1:45.**

**Fourth quarter**

**Top passers**

- MIN – Matt Cassel – 13/27, 114 yards, TD, 3 INT
- CIN – Andy Dalton – 27/38, 366 yards, 4 TD

**Top rushers**

- MIN – Cordarrelle Patterson – 3 rushes, 54 yards, TD
- CIN – BenJarvus Green-Ellis – 12 rushes, 24 yards, TD

**Top receivers**

- MIN – Jarius Wright – 1 reception, 36 yards, TD
- CIN – A. J. Green – 7 receptions, 97 yards, 2 TD

==== Week 17: vs. Detroit Lions ====
Week 17: Detroit Lions at Minnesota Vikings – Game summary

Quarter	1	2	3	4	Total
Lions	0	0	7	6	**13**
**Vikings**	7	0	0	7	**14**

at Mall of America Field at the Hubert H. Humphrey Metrodome, Minneapolis, Minnesota

- Date: December 29
- Game time: 12:00 p.m. CST
- Game weather: None (indoor stadium)
- Game attendance: 64,134
- Referee: Tony Corrente (99)
- TV announcers (Fox): Gus Johnson, Charles Davis and Kristina Pink
- Recap, Game book

Game information

**First quarter**

- MIN – Cordarrelle Patterson 50-yard run (Blair Walsh kick), 2:41. Vikings 7–0. **Drive: 2 plays, 69 yards, 0:52.**

**Second quarter**

- No scoring plays

**Third quarter**

- DET – Reggie Bush 19-yard pass from Matthew Stafford (David Akers kick), 10:27. Tied 7–7. **Drive: 9 plays, 85 yards, 4:33.**

**Fourth quarter**

- DET – David Akers 25-yard field goal, 14:25. Lions 10–7. **Drive: 13 plays, 76 yards, 7:36.**
- DET – David Akers 53-yard field goal, 12:43. Lions 13–7. **Drive: 4 plays, 6 yards, 0:51.**
- MIN – Cordarrelle Patterson 8-yard pass from Matt Cassel (Blair Walsh kick), 9:19. Vikings 14–13. **Drive: 2 plays, 8 yards, 0:08.**

**Top passers**

- DET – Matthew Stafford – 22/33, 217 yards, TD
- MIN – Matt Cassel – 20/33, 189 yards, TD, INT

**Top rushers**

- DET – Reggie Bush – 14 rushes, 32 yards
- MIN – Matt Asiata – 14 rushes, 115 yards

**Top receivers**

- DET – Kevin Ogletree – 5 receptions, 75 yards
- MIN – Greg Jennings – 5 receptions, 44 yards

In the last game to be played at the Metrodome before its demolition, the Vikings hosted their divisional rivals, the Detroit Lions. This turned out to be the only game of the Vikings' season (including preseason) in which the opposing team scored fewer than 20 points. A 50-yard run from Cordarrelle Patterson for the first score of the game put the Vikings up 7–0, where the score remained through halftime. After the half, Reggie Bush struck back with a 19-yard touchdown reception to tie the game at 7–7 in the third. The fourth quarter saw David Akers make two field goals to put the Lions in the lead 13–7. However, Matt Cassel threw a TD pass to Patterson to put the Vikings back in the lead 14–13, which they managed to hold onto for the remaining nine minutes of the game.

Head coach Leslie Frazier was fired as head coach of the Minnesota Vikings the following day. His tenure ended with a record of 21–32–1 in over three years.

=== Standings ===
==== Division ====
NFC North
	W	L	T	PCT	DIV	CONF	PF	PA	STK
^{(4)} Green Bay Packers	8	7	1	.531	3–2–1	6–5–1	417	428	W1
Chicago Bears	8	8	0	.500	2–4	4–8	445	478	L2
Detroit Lions	7	9	0	.438	4–2	6–6	395	376	L4
Minnesota Vikings	5	10	1	.344	2–3–1	4–7–1	391	480	W1

==== Conference ====
NFC
#	Team	Division	W	L	T	PCT	DIV	CONF	SOS	SOV	STK
**Division winners**
1	Seattle Seahawks	West	13	3	0	.813	4–2	10–2	.490	.445	W1
2	Carolina Panthers	South	12	4	0	.750	5–1	9–3	.494	.451	W3
3	Philadelphia Eagles	East	10	6	0	.625	4–2	9–3	.453	.391	W2
4	Green Bay Packers	North	8	7	1	.531	3–2–1	6–5–1	.453	.371	W1
**Wild cards**
5	San Francisco 49ers	West	12	4	0	.750	5–1	9–3	.494	.414	W6
6	New Orleans Saints	South	11	5	0	.688	5–1	9–3	.516	.455	W1
**Did not qualify for the postseason**
7	Arizona Cardinals	West	10	6	0	.625	2–4	6–6	.531	.444	L1
8 (Note: Chicago defeated Dallas head-to-head (Week 14, 45–28).)	Chicago Bears	North	8	8	0	.500	2–4	4–8	.465	.469	L2
9	Dallas Cowboys	East	8	8	0	.500	5–1	7–5	.484	.363	L1
10 (Note: The NY Giants and Detroit finished with a better conference record than St. Louis.) (Note: The NY Giants defeated Detroit head-to-head (Week 16, 23–20 (OT)).)	New York Giants	East	7	9	0	.438	3–3	6–6	.520	.366	W2
11 (Note: Detroit finished with a better conference record than St. Louis.)	Detroit Lions	North	7	9	0	.438	4–2	6–6	.457	.402	L4
12	St. Louis Rams	West	7	9	0	.438	1–5	4–8	.551	.446	L1
13	Minnesota Vikings	North	5	10	1	.344	2–3–1	4–7–1	.512	.450	W1
14 (Note: Atlanta finished with a better conference record than Tampa Bay.)	Atlanta Falcons	South	4	12	0	.250	1–5	3–9	.553	.313	L2
15	Tampa Bay Buccaneers	South	4	12	0	.250	1–5	2–10	.574	.391	L3
16	Washington Redskins	East	3	13	0	.188	0–6	1–11	.516	.438	L8
**Tiebreakers** (Note: When breaking ties for three or more teams under the NFL's rules, they are first broken within divisions, then comparing only the highest-ranked remaining team from each division.)

== Staff ==
2013 Minnesota Vikings staff
Front office: Owner/chairman – Zygi Wilf; Owner/president – Mark Wilf; Owner/vice chairman – Leonard Wilf; General manager – Rick Spielman; Vice president of football operations – Rob Brzezinski; Assistant general manager – George Paton; Director of college scouting – Scott Studwell; Assistant director of college scouting – Jamaal Stephenson; Head coaches: Head coach – Leslie Frazier; Special assistant to the head coach/linebackers – Mike Singletary; Assistant to the head coach – Jeff Howard; Offensive coaches: Offensive coordinator – Bill Musgrave; Quarterbacks – Craig Johnson; Assistant quarterbacks – Kevin Stefanski; Running backs – James Saxon; Wide receivers – George Stewart; Tight ends – Jimmie Johnson; Offensive line – Jeff Davidson; Assistant offensive line/offensive quality control – Ryan Silverfield; Offensive quality control – Klint Kubiak	Defensive coaches: Defensive coordinator – Alan Williams; Defensive line – Brendan Daly; Assistant defensive line – Diron Reynolds; Linebackers – Fred Pagac; Defensive backs – Joe Woods; Assistant secondary – Jeff Imamura; Special teams coaches: Special teams coordinator – Mike Priefer; Assistant special teams – Ryan Ficken; Strength and conditioning: Head athletic trainer/director of sports medicine – Eric Sugarman; Strength and conditioning – Tom Kanavy; Assistant strength and conditioning – Martin Streight; Assistant strength and conditioning – Aaron McLaurin; Assistant strength and conditioning – Chaz Mahle

== Roster ==
2013 Minnesota Vikings roster
Quarterbacks (QB): 16 Matt Cassel; 12 Josh Freeman; 7 Christian Ponder; Running backs (RB): 44 Matt Asiata; 23 Joe Banyard; 42 Jerome Felton FB; 32 Toby Gerhart; 28 Adrian Peterson; Wide receivers (WR): 15 Greg Jennings; 84 Cordarrelle Patterson; 81 Jerome Simpson; 83 Rodney Smith; 14 Joe Webb; 17 Jarius Wright; Tight ends (TE): 40 Rhett Ellison; 86 Chase Ford	Offensive linemen (OL): 60 Jeff Baca G; 61 Joe Berger C/G; 63 Brandon Fusco G; 74 Charlie Johnson G; 75 Matt Kalil T; 71 Phil Loadholt T; 67 Mike Remmers T; 65 John Sullivan C; 73 J'Marcus Webb T; Defensive linemen (DL): 69 Jared Allen DE; 91 Chase Baker DT; 90 Fred Evans DT; 95 Sharrif Floyd DT; 97 Everson Griffen DE; 98 Letroy Guion DT; 96 Brian Robison DE; 92 Justin Trattou DE; 93 Kevin Williams DT	Linebackers (LB): 51 Larry Dean OLB; 52 Chad Greenway OLB; 50 Erin Henderson MLB; 54 Gerald Hodges OLB; 56 Michael Mauti MLB; 55 Marvin Mitchell OLB; Defensive backs (DB): 36 Robert Blanton S; 20 Chris Cook CB; 27 Shaun Prater CB; 41 Mistral Raymond SS; 29 Xavier Rhodes CB; 33 Jamarca Sanford SS; 34 Andrew Sendejo FS; 35 Marcus Sherels CB; 22 Harrison Smith FS; 26 Robert Steeples CB; Special teams (ST): 18 Jeff Locke P; 46 Cullen Loeffler LS; 3 Blair Walsh K	Practice squad: 30 Brandan Bishop S; 25 Kip Edwards CB; 68 Kevin Murphy T; 64 Spencer Nealy DE; 38 Bradley Randle RB; 19 Adam Thielen WR; Reserve: 59 Desmond Bishop OLB (IR); 89 John Carlson TE (IR); 85 Greg Childs WR (PUP); 57 Audie Cole MLB (IR); 48 Zach Line FB (IR); 21 Josh Robinson CB (IR); 82 Kyle Rudolph TE (IR); Rookies in italics 53 active, 7 reserve, 6 practice squad

== Statistics ==
=== Team leaders ===
Category	Player(s)	Value
Passing yards	Matt Cassel	1,807
Passing touchdowns	Matt Cassel	11
Rushing yards	Adrian Peterson	1,266
Rushing touchdowns	Adrian Peterson	10
Receptions	Greg Jennings	68
Receiving yards	Greg Jennings	804
Receiving touchdowns	Greg Jennings	4
Points	Blair Walsh	121
Kickoff return yards	Cordarrelle Patterson	1,393 *
Punt return yards	Marcus Sherels	335
Tackles	Chad Greenway	134
Sacks	Jared Allen	11.5
Interceptions	Chad Greenway	3
Forced fumbles	Jared Allen; Jamarca Sanford	2

* Vikings single season record.

=== League rankings ===
Category	Total yards	Yards per game	NFL rank (out of 32)
Passing offense	3,427	214.2	23rd
Rushing offense	2,081	130.1	8th
Total offense	5,508	344.2	13th
Passing defense	4,598	287.4	31st
Rushing defense	1,767	110.4	16th
Total defense	6,365	397.8	31st
