= Matt Cassel =

American football player (born 1982)

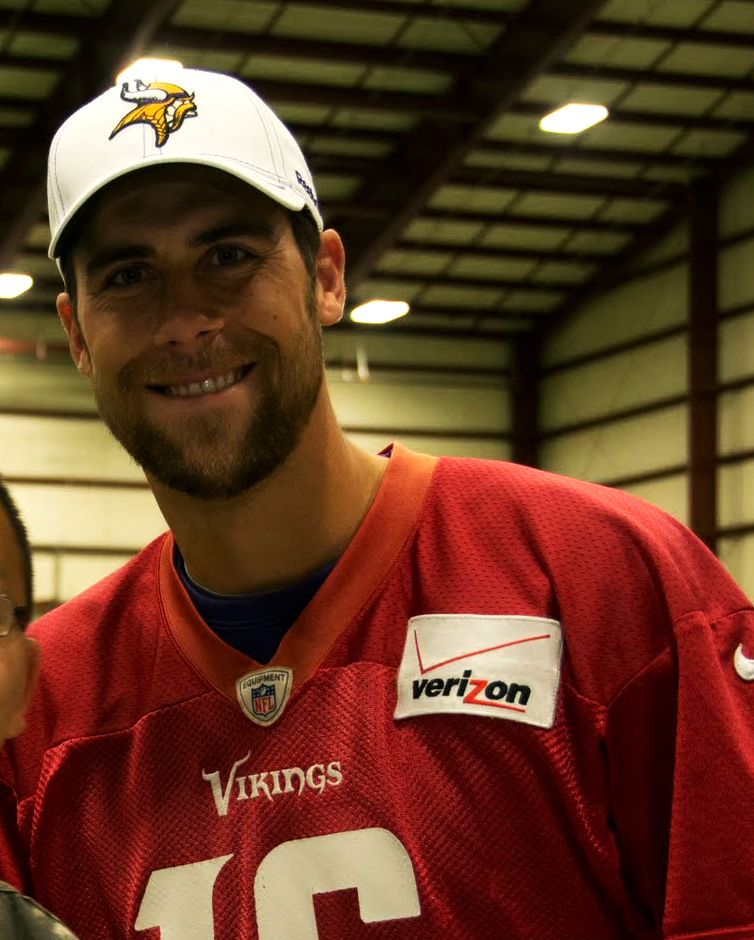
- Cassel with the Minnesota Vikings in 2013

No. 16, 7, 8
- Position: Quarterback

Personal information
- Born: May 17, 1982 (age 44); Los Angeles, California, U.S.
- Listed height: 6 ft 4 in (1.93 m)
- Listed weight: 225 lb (102 kg)

Career information
- High school: Chatsworth (Los Angeles)
- College: USC (2001–2004)
- NFL draft: 2005: 7th round, 230th overall pick

Career history
- New England Patriots (2005–2008); Kansas City Chiefs (2009–2012); Minnesota Vikings (2013–2014); Buffalo Bills (2015); Dallas Cowboys (2015); Tennessee Titans (2016–2017); Detroit Lions (2018)

Awards and highlights
- Pro Bowl (2010)

Career NFL statistics
- Passing attempts: 2,683
- Passing completions: 1,578
- Completion percentage: 58.8%
- TD–INT: 104–82
- Passing yards: 17,508
- Passer rating: 78.6
- Stats at Pro Football Reference

Matthew Brennan Cassel (born May 17, 1982) is an American former professional football quarterback who played in the National Football League (NFL) for 14 seasons. He was a member of seven NFL teams, most notably the New England Patriots and Kansas City Chiefs. Cassel played college football for the USC Trojans and was selected by the Patriots in the seventh round of the 2005 NFL draft. Since retiring, he has served as a television football analyst on NBC Sports Boston, as well as Big Ten and Notre Dame college football games on NBC and Peacock.

Cassel began his career as a backup to Tom Brady until Brady suffered a season-ending injury in the first game of 2008. During his one season as the Patriots' starter, Cassel helped them obtain a 11–5 record, but missed the playoffs. He was traded to the Chiefs the following year, playing there from 2009 to 2012. Cassel's most successful season was in 2010 when he led the Chiefs to their first division title since 2003 and earned Pro Bowl honors. After leaving Kansas City, Cassel joined the Minnesota Vikings before spending the rest of his career as a backup for the Buffalo Bills, Dallas Cowboys, Tennessee Titans, and Detroit Lions.

== Early life ==
Cassel was born in Los Angeles. When he was 11 years old, his family home was at the epicenter of the 1994 Northridge earthquake, which at one point trapped his father Greg under a marble column and caused water from their swimming pool to flood their house. Their home was eventually condemned as a result, forcing the Cassel family to move.

Cassel was the starting first baseman on the Northridge baseball team that reached the finals of the 1994 Little League World Series.

Cassel attended Chatsworth High School and was a letterman, an all-city selection, and a standout in football, basketball, and baseball. As a senior, he was ranked as the number eight quarterback and ranked 53rd overall of the top high school players in the nation according to ESPN's Tom Lemming's Top 100. Lemming called Cassel a "pro-style pocket passer with a very strong, accurate delivery." In addition to playing quarterback, Cassel was also Chatsworth's punter. He committed to play at USC before starting his senior year in high school.

Cassel also had an appearance in the HBO Family program Freshman Year, a reality show in which his younger brother was one of the featured students.

== College career ==
Cassel began his college career in 2001 and spent that entire Trojan career as a backup behind Heisman Trophy winners Carson Palmer and Matt Leinart. Cassel saw limited time in three games in the 2001 season. He made his lone collegiate start at H-back against California in 2001. Cassel was the backup for Palmer during his Heisman-winning 2002 season. Cassel appeared in three games and completed three passes for 27 total yards. In the fall, he lost the battle for the starting position to the previous third-string quarterback Leinart. Because of Leinart's success, Cassel spent time at tight end and wide receiver in 2003, and some special teams that year. That season, he appeared in two games and completed 6-of-13 passes for 63 yards. In his last season with the Trojans, Cassel was 10-of-14 for 97 yards and an interception. That year USC would be named the Associated Press and Football Writers Association of America (FWAA) national champions.

During his four seasons at USC, Cassel completed 20-of-33 passes for 192 yards, with no touchdowns and one interception. He and the Trojans would win a second national championship by winning the 2005 Orange Bowl, that year's BCS National Championship Game. The team also won the AP title for the second year in a row. Cassel, a communication major at USC, was also roommates with Pittsburgh Steelers safety Troy Polamalu and Carson Palmer.

Cassel played one season of baseball for USC in 2004, compiling an 0–1 record with 10 strikeouts and four walks. He played in eight games and started one. Cassel struck out in his only at bat in college. He also had two saves with a 9.35 ERA, and was selected by the Oakland Athletics in the 36th round of the 2004 MLB draft.

== Professional career ==
Pre-draft measurables
| Height | Weight | Arm length | Hand span | 40-yard dash | 10-yard split | 20-yard split | 20-yard shuttle | Three-cone drill | Vertical jump | Broad jump |
|---|---|---|---|---|---|---|---|---|---|---|
| 6 ft 4 3/8 in (1.94 m) | 232 lb (105 kg) | 31 5/8 in (0.80 m) | 9 in (0.23 m) | 4.88 s | 1.71 s | 2.84 s | 4.08 s | 7.21 s | 34 in (0.86 m) | 9 ft 7 in (2.92 m) |
All values taken at Pro Day

=== New England Patriots ===
Despite having had little chance to demonstrate his skills in actual game situations at USC, Cassel earned himself a place on several NFL teams' draft boards after working out at USC's 2005 Pro Day. One of Cassel's coaches, Norm Chow, who had left USC to become the offensive coordinator for the Tennessee Titans, had discussed signing Cassel as an undrafted free agent after the 2005 NFL draft; Chow was surprised to learn the Patriots had drafted Cassel in the seventh round, with the 230th overall pick, ahead of more accomplished college quarterbacks such as Timmy Chang and 2003 Heisman Trophy winner Jason White.

==== 2005 season ====
Cassel began the 2005 season third on the Patriots' depth chart behind Tom Brady and Doug Flutie, after beating out two more veteran quarterbacks, Chris Redman and Rohan Davey. Cassel saw his first regular season action in the closing minutes of the Patriots' 41–17 loss to the San Diego Chargers on October 2, 2005, going 2-for-4 for 15 yards and an interception.

In the Patriots' final game of the regular season, a narrow 28–26 loss to the Miami Dolphins on January 1, 2006, Cassel played the final three quarters. Though he was sacked for a safety, Cassel threw for 168 yards and two touchdowns, one to wide receiver Tim Dwight and another to tight end Benjamin Watson. The pass to Dwight set up a drop-kick by Doug Flutie, the first such kick since 1941.

==== 2006 season ====
Following Flutie's retirement in the 2006 offseason, Cassel moved up to second on the Patriots' depth chart. Although the Patriots considered signing a veteran quarterback to compete with him, Cassel played well in preseason and became the primary backup to Brady. Cassel was on the 45-man active roster for all 16 games in 2006; when the Patriots brought in yet another Heisman winner, Vinny Testaverde, who acted as the emergency quarterback.

After injuries to Josh Miller and Ken Walter in Week 16, Cassel assumed duties as holder for kicker Stephen Gostkowski. He also led a late touchdown drive in the regular-season finale against the Tennessee Titans.

==== 2007 season ====
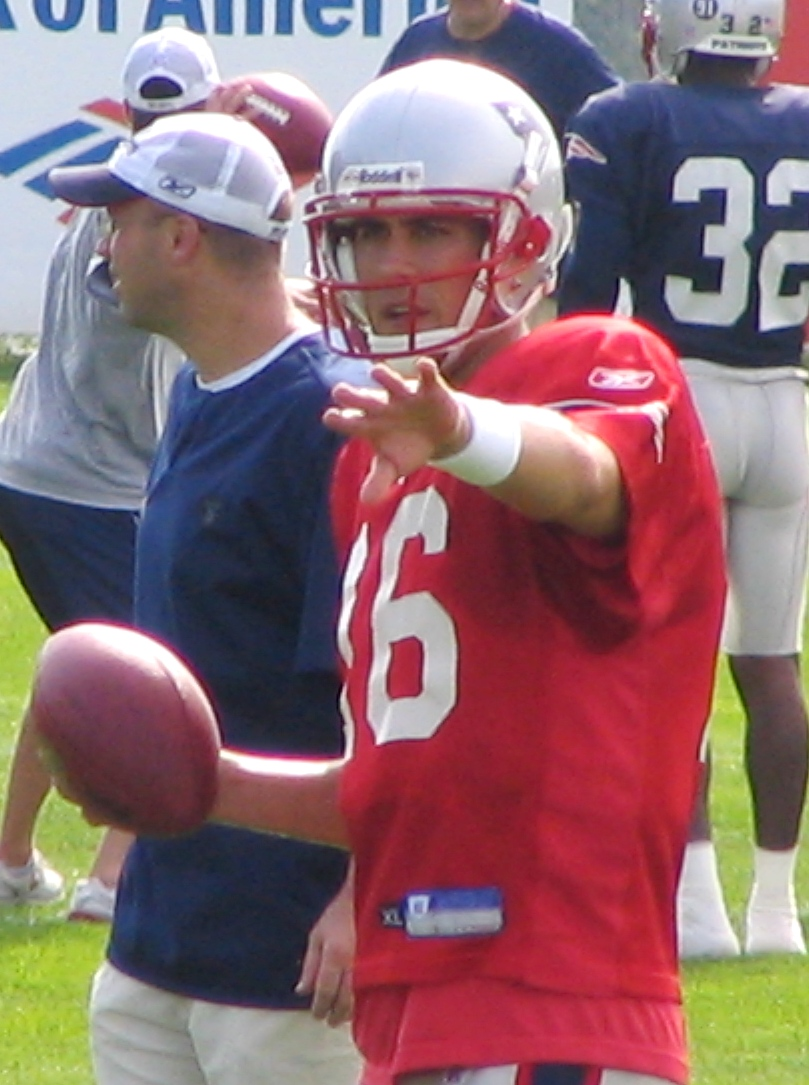
Cassel with the New England Patriots in 2007

Cassel remained in a backup role in the 2007 season. During Week 7 against the Miami Dolphins, Cassel's second pass was intercepted by Jason Taylor and returned for a touchdown. In the next game against the Washington Redskins, Cassel capped off the 52–7 victory with a 15-yard touchdown run where he dove over two Washington defenders to reach the end zone.

==== 2008 season ====
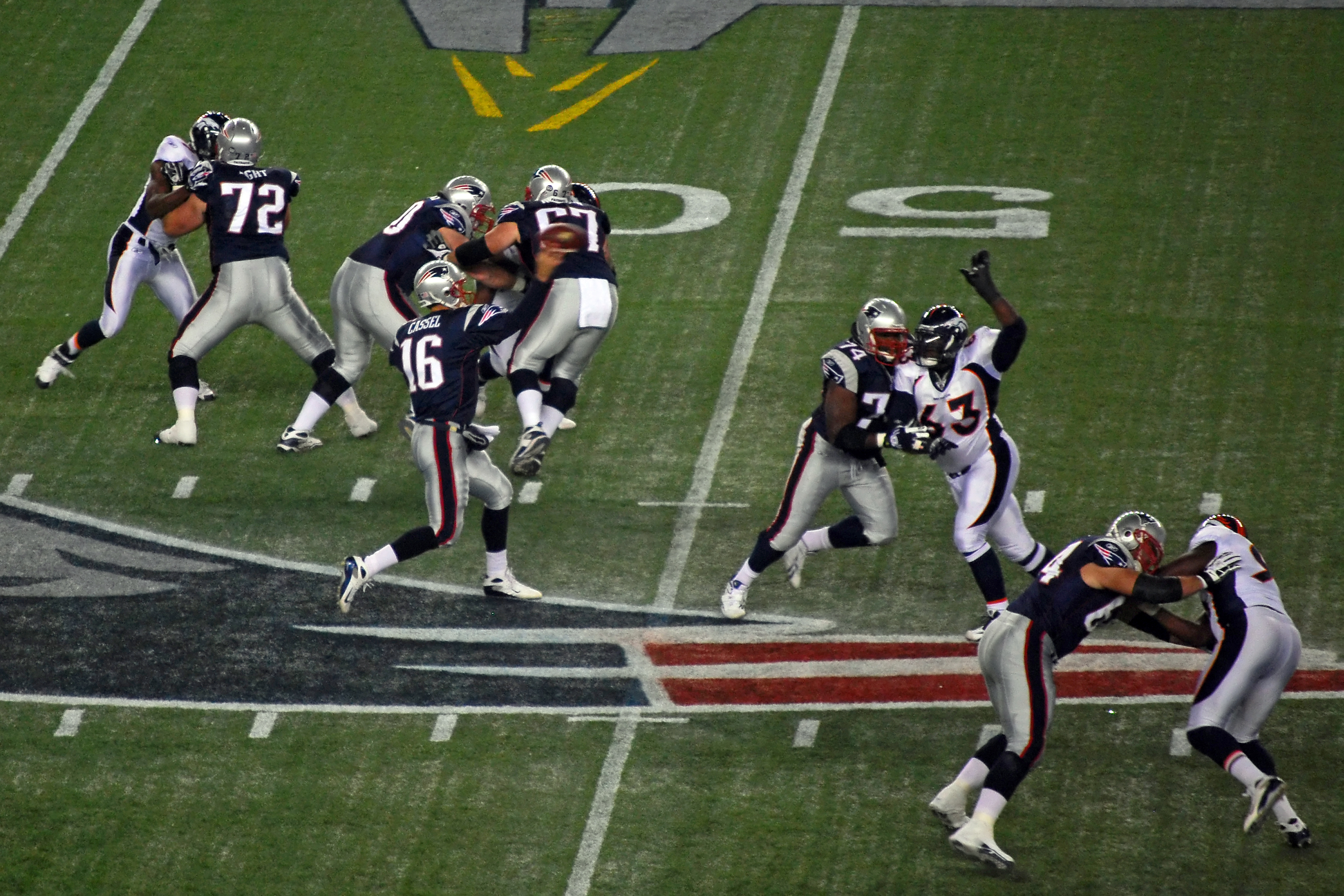
Cassel in October 2008

During the season-opener against the Kansas City Chiefs, Cassel came under center when Brady suffered a torn ACL and MCL in the first quarter from a hit by Chiefs safety Bernard Pollard. Cassel led the Patriots to a 17–10 victory, completing 13-of-18 passes for 152 yards and a touchdown; his drives accounted for all of New England's points. The day after the game, the Patriots confirmed that Brady's injuries would sideline him for the rest of the season. Although the Patriots did bring quarterbacks Chris Simms and Tim Rattay to Foxborough, they signed neither, and kept Cassel as the starter.

Cassel made his first NFL start on September 14, 2008, with a winning effort over the New York Jets, completing 16 of 23 passes for 165 yards. The Patriots' 19–10 victory was the first time in six tries that a quarterback making his first NFL start defeated a team led by Brett Favre.

Cassel was voted AFC Offensive Player of the Week for his Week 7 performance against the Denver Broncos on Monday Night Football. Cassel had 183 passing yards and three touchdowns in a 41–7 rout, which made it his first three touchdown pass game.

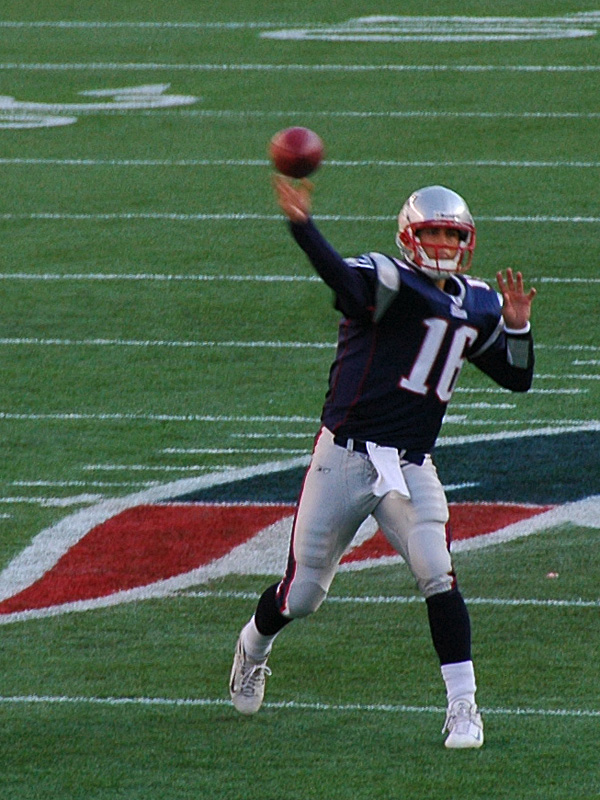
Cassel in 2008

Cassel scored the second rushing touchdown of his career on a 13-yard rush in Week 10 against the Buffalo Bills as the Patriots won 20–10. The Patriots held the ball in the game for over 37 minutes; the final 19-play drive, which lasted over nine minutes, tied a franchise record for most plays in a single drive.

During a Week 11 34–31 overtime loss to the New York Jets, Cassel led the Patriots on three consecutive scoring drives to bring them back from a 24–6 deficit with two minutes left in the first half, and threw a 16-yard touchdown to Randy Moss on 4th-and-1 with one second remaining to send the game into overtime. Cassel finished 30-for-51 passing, with 400 yards, 3 touchdowns (and a pass for a two-point conversion), and no interceptions for a passer rating of 103.4, and 62 yards rushing on eight attempts. He became the first Patriot to throw for 300 yards and rush for 50 yards in the same game, and the first player since at least the AFL-NFL merger to have 400 passing yards and 60 rushing yards in the same game.

In Week 12, Cassel led the Patriots to a 48–28 victory over the Miami Dolphins, who in Week 3 had ended the Patriots' NFL record 21-game regular-season win streak. While Cassel threw for just 131 yards in the Week 3 loss, his Week 12 performance topped his performance against the Jets: Cassel completed 30 of 43 passes for 415 yards, three touchdowns to Randy Moss, and one interception, for a passer rating of 114.0; Cassel also had 14 yards on two rushes, including an 8-yard touchdown run. The performance made Cassel the first quarterback in franchise history, and only the fifth quarterback in NFL history, to have consecutive games with 400+ yards passing. His efforts earned him the title of AFC Offensive Player of the Week for the second time. During Week 15 against the Oakland Raiders, Cassel, playing just six days after the death of his father, set a new personal best, throwing for four touchdowns in a 49–26 victory.

In Week 16, against the playoff-bound Arizona Cardinals, Cassel led the Patriots to a 47–7 blowout victory through snow, sleet, and rain in the Patriots' last regular-season home game of 2008. Cassel, playing in snow for the first time ever, nevertheless completed 20 of 36 passes for 345 yards, three touchdowns, and no interceptions, while helping the Patriots remain in the hunt for the AFC East title. In a role reversal, Matt Leinart entered the game as the Cardinals' backup quarterback when Kurt Warner was pulled from the game with the Cardinals trailing 44–0; Leinart completed 6 of 14 passes, for 138 yards, a touchdown, and an interception.

In Week 17, Cassel led the Patriots to their fourth consecutive win, 13–0 over the Buffalo Bills in a game marked by winds so severe that they bent the goalposts both before and during the game. Cassel completed six passes out of just eight attempts, the third-lowest attempt total in franchise history (the second-lowest being the 5 attempts of the 1982 Snowplow Game and the lowest being the three attempts of their 2021 Week 13 game against the Buffalo Bills). Cassel finished the game with 78 yards; his most notable play, however, was a quick kick punt on third down in the fourth quarter; with the wind at his back, Cassel's kick landed inside the 20, and then rolled towards the Bills' end zone before it was downed, stranding the Bills at their own 2-yard line, struggling against the wind, down two scores with five minutes remaining.

On January 4, 2009, ESPN's Chris Mortensen reported that the Patriots would franchise tag Cassel. The Patriots made it official on February 5, the first day of the 2009 franchise period, and Cassel agreed to the tender two days later.

By the end of the 2008 season, Cassel had become the first quarterback in NFL history to record at least 10 wins, 325 completions, a 63% completion mark, 3,600 passing yards, 20 touchdown passes, 11 or fewer interceptions, and 250 rushing yards in a single season. As of 2017, only two other quarterbacks have accomplished the feat, Russell Wilson (twice) and Aaron Rodgers (five times).

=== Kansas City Chiefs ===
==== 2009 season ====
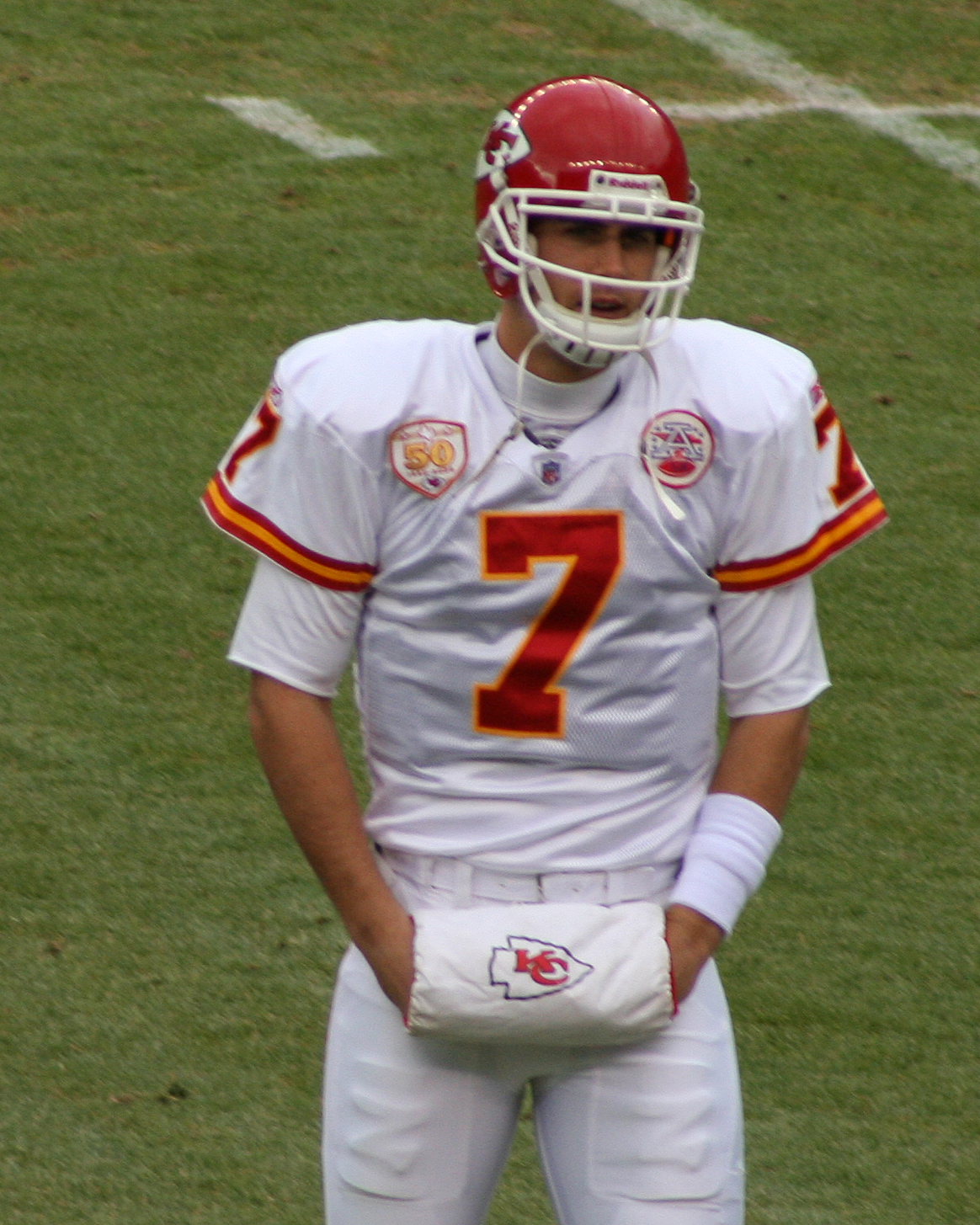
Cassel with the Kansas City Chiefs in 2009

On February 28, 2009, the Patriots traded both Cassel and outside linebacker Mike Vrabel to the Kansas City Chiefs for the 34th overall selection (Patrick Chung) in the 2009 NFL draft. NFL Network's Adam Schefter (now with ESPN) described as "one of the wilder and more complex behind-the-scene dramas the NFL has seen in any recent offseason," with the Tampa Bay Buccaneers proposing a three-way trade with the Denver Broncos, in which the Buccaneers would have received Broncos quarterback Jay Cutler, the Broncos would have received Cassel, and New England would have received a first-round draft pick.

Cassel then briefly became teammates with Bernard Pollard, the player whose hit in 2008 caused Brady's injury and subsequently made Cassel the starter that season. In an interview, Cassel said he would "thank" Pollard for the opportunity, but also stated that he believed the hit on Brady was "unintentional" and he never wishes to see anyone get hurt while playing.

Cassel was expected to compete with Tyler Thigpen, who started 11 games for the Chiefs in 2008, for the starting quarterback position. Since Cassel's number 16 from New England is retired in Kansas City in honor of Len Dawson, Cassel decided to wear number 7; he chose 7 because it equals one plus six. Eventually, Thigpen was traded to the Miami Dolphins.

On July 14, 2009, the Chiefs signed Cassel to a six-year, $62.7 million contract that included $28 million in guaranteed money, and $40.5 million in total compensation in the first three seasons.

On August 29, 2009, Cassel suffered an MCL injury during the first quarter of a preseason game against the Seattle Seahawks. He was dragged to the ground and grabbed for his knee immediately upon impact. Cassel attempted to continue playing but called a timeout and limped off the field. Brodie Croyle started the final game of the preseason against the St. Louis Rams as well as the regular season opening game against the Baltimore Ravens when Cassel was still unable to play. However, Cassel started every game thereafter, going 4–11. He threw for 2,924 yards, 16 touchdowns, and 16 interceptions for a quarterback rating of 69.9 in his first season with the Chiefs.

==== 2010 season ====
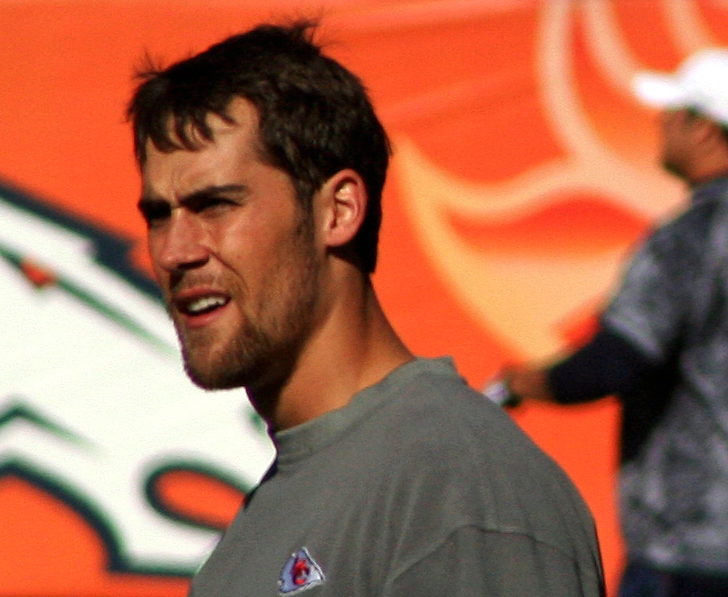
Cassel in 2010

In 2010, Cassel had a resurgent season starting with a 21–14 victory over the San Diego Chargers in Week 1 at home in Arrowhead. Cassel would build off of this start helping guide the Chiefs to a 7–4 record over the first 12 weeks of the year. Due to his form during November, Cassel was named AFC Offensive Player of the Month for November. He completed 90 of 144 passes (62.5%) for 1,111 yards and an NFL-leading 12 touchdowns, with just one interception. Cassel had a 111.2 passer rating for the month. Due to his performance against the Seattle Seahawks, Cassel won the FedEx Air & Ground NFL Players of the Week award, as voted by the fans.

On December 8, 2010, Cassel underwent an emergency appendectomy. It was unclear at the time whether he would be able to play in that week's game against the Chargers. The Chiefs ended up starting backup Brodie Croyle and lost the game 31–0. However, Cassel returned for the next two games and led the Chiefs to landslide victories over both the St. Louis Rams in the Governors Cup and then at home against the Tennessee Titans. The 34–14 victory over the Titans, along with a loss by the Chargers to the Bengals, helped the Chiefs clinch the AFC West title. This would be the first Chiefs playoff game in four years and the first home playoff game since 2003, the last time the Chiefs won the AFC West division. In the Wild Card Round against the Baltimore Ravens, Cassel went 9 of 18 for 70 passing yards and three interceptions during the 30–7 loss.

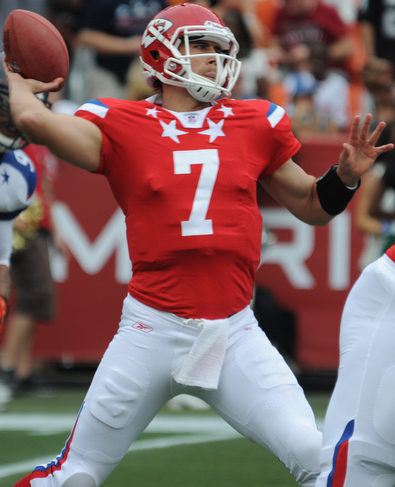
Cassel at the 2011 Pro Bowl

In January 2011, Cassel was named as an alternate to the Pro Bowl in place of an injured Tom Brady.

==== 2011 season ====
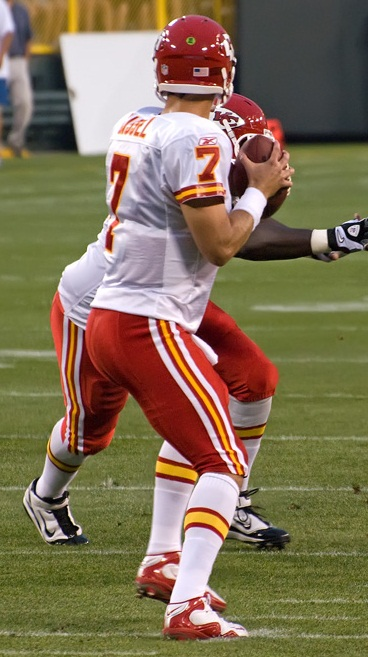
Cassel in 2011

In 2011, Cassel led the Chiefs to a 4–4 record. During the first two games, he only threw one touchdown. Those first two games were blowout losses. In the second game, Cassel threw three interceptions. Cassel finally had his first good game, throwing two touchdowns in a 20–17 loss against the San Diego Chargers. He led the Chiefs to their first win of the season against the Minnesota Vikings, where he threw for 260 yards and a touchdown. In the next game against the Indianapolis Colts, he led the Chiefs to a comeback victory. The Colts jumped to a 17–0 lead, but Cassel threw four touchdowns and 257 yards with no interceptions to lead the Chiefs to a 28–24 victory. After the game, Cassel had a 138.9 quarterback rating. In Week 8, Cassel threw one touchdown but also threw two interceptions. Two weeks later, Cassel injured his hand against the Denver Broncos. He was replaced by Tyler Palko, and had surgery on the injured hand on November 14. On November 21, Cassel was placed on injured reserve, ending his season.

==== 2012 season ====
In Week 1, Cassel had a tremendous first half against the Atlanta Falcons but threw two interceptions in the second half. His final stats were two interceptions, one touchdown, one rushing touchdown, and a 72.5 quarterback rating. The final score resulted in a Chiefs loss, 24–40. The Chiefs had to rely on a 91-yard run by Jamaal Charles, a safety, and four field goals to gain their first win against the New Orleans Saints, as even with excellent field position throughout the second half, Cassel could not lead the team to the endzone; he threw one interception and no touchdowns. The final score of that game was a 27–24 overtime win for the Chiefs. The next week, Cassel struggled and threw two touchdowns, but three interceptions in a 20–37 Chiefs loss against the San Diego Chargers. After the game, his starting job appeared to be in jeopardy, but head coach Romeo Crennel said Cassel would start the next game against the Baltimore Ravens. In that game, Cassel left the game with a head injury. Earlier in the day, a group called Save Our Chiefs rallied fans together and flew a banner over Arrowhead calling for the General Manager Scott Pioli to be fired and for Cassel to be benched.

On October 11, 2012, Crennel announced Cassel had been ruled out of the Week 6 game against the Tampa Bay Buccaneers and named Brady Quinn the starter for the game. At the time of Cassel's injury, he had accumulated nine interceptions and five fumbles through the first five games of the season. This mark was more than any other team in the NFL, except the Philadelphia Eagles, who also had 14 turnovers in their first five games of the year. On October 22, 2012, Crennel named Quinn as the starting quarterback for the Chiefs following their bye week. Cassel was deemed healthy enough to play, but still given the backup role.

On March 13, 2013, sources close to the Chiefs reported they intended to trade or release Cassel. The next day, he was released.

=== Minnesota Vikings ===
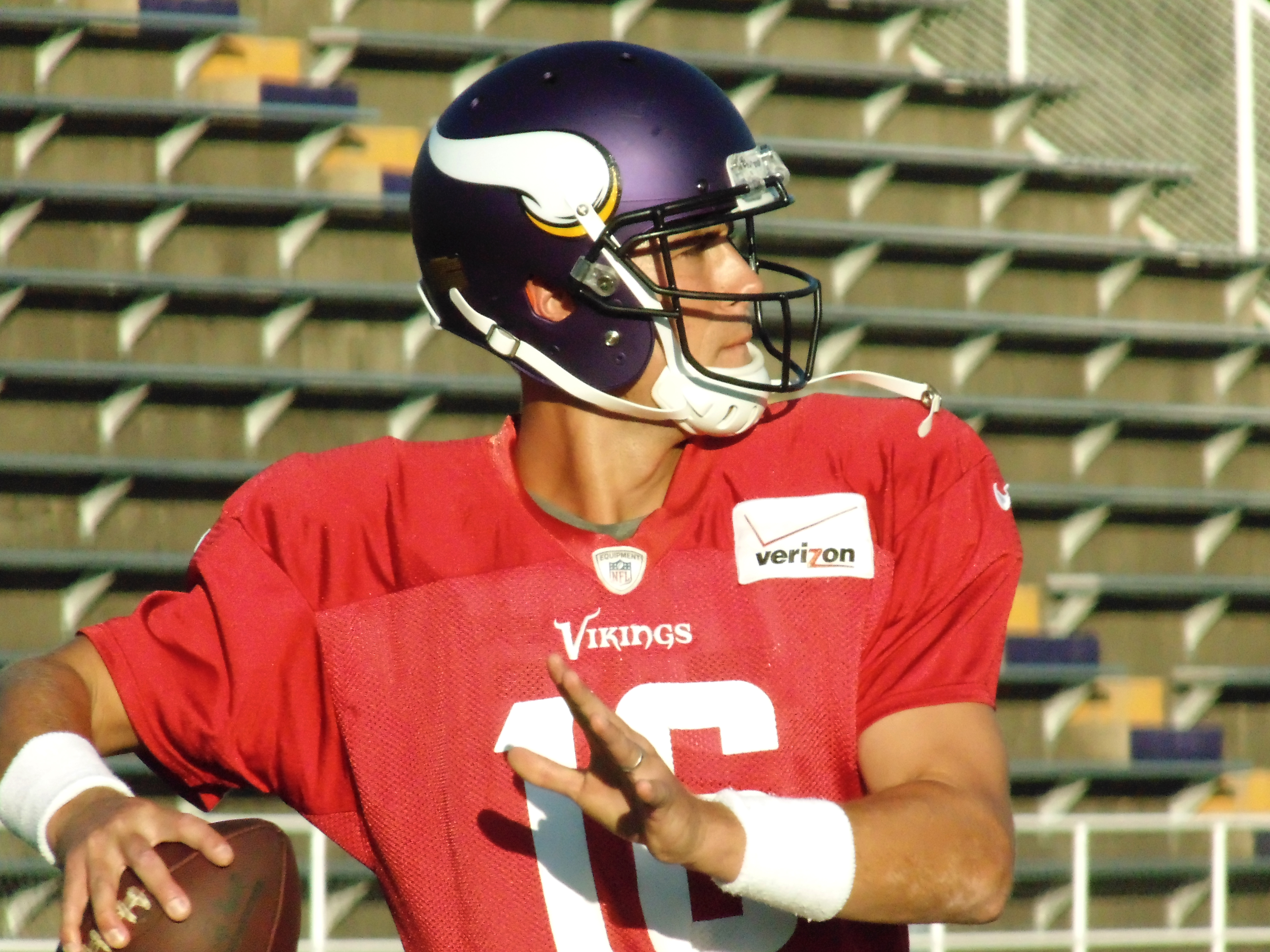
Cassel with the Minnesota Vikings in 2014

On the same day he was released from the Chiefs, Cassel signed with the Minnesota Vikings.

On September 27, it was announced that Cassel would get his first start as a Viking in Week 4 against the Pittsburgh Steelers due to a rib injury to starting quarterback Christian Ponder. The Vikings won the game 34–27. Due to another injury to Ponder, Cassel received his third start of the season Week 14 against the Baltimore Ravens. Despite a two-touchdown, zero interception performance, the Vikings lost by a score of 29–26 during a heavy snow game. Cassel would remain the starting quarterback the rest of the season where the Vikings finished with a 5–10–1 record and Cassel either played the whole game or came in to rally the Vikings from behind in all five victories.

On March 7, 2014, it was reported that Cassel had signed a new two-year deal for $10 million. It was later announced on August 25 that Cassel would be the starting quarterback over rookie Teddy Bridgewater and Ponder. However, on September 21, Cassel broke his foot against the New Orleans Saints and was placed on injured reserve. In only three games, Cassel totaled 425 passing yards, three touchdowns, and four interceptions.

=== Buffalo Bills ===
On March 10, 2015, the Vikings traded Cassel along with a sixth round 2015 NFL draft pick to the Buffalo Bills in exchange for a 2015 fifth round pick and a seventh round pick in 2016. Cassel was involved in a three-way quarterback competition between former Bills first round pick EJ Manuel and former Ravens backup Tyrod Taylor. After losing the competition to Taylor, Cassel was released by the Bills on September 5, 2015. However, he was re-signed three days later to back up Taylor. Cassel was credited as the Bills' starting quarterback for the season opener due to him taking the team's first snap on offense in the wildcat formation with Taylor lined up at wide receiver.

=== Dallas Cowboys ===
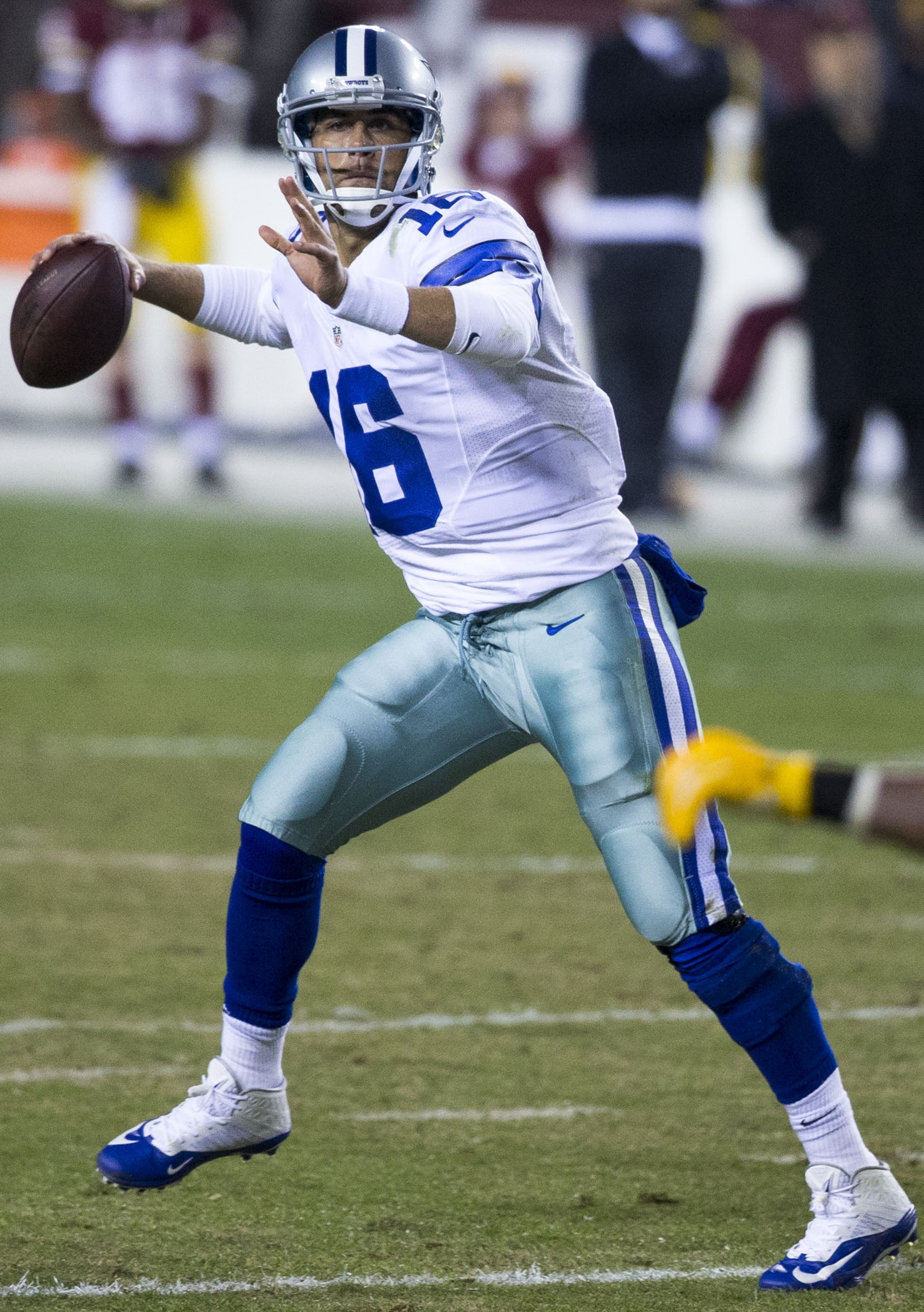
Cassel with the Dallas Cowboys in 2015

On September 22, 2015, Cassel was traded to the Dallas Cowboys after Tony Romo suffered a broken collarbone. In addition to Cassel, the Cowboys also received Buffalo's 2017 seventh round pick (#228-Joey Ivie) in exchange for Dallas' 2017 fifth round pick (#171-Nathan Peterman).

Although Brandon Weeden was expected to start, the Cowboys covered themselves by also trading for Cassel. After Weeden lost the three games he started, Cassel replaced him as the starting quarterback while the injured Romo continued to rehab. Cassel was never able to have any sustained offensive success and was prone to critical errors. On December 19, after a disastrous showing against the New York Jets, Cassel was benched and replaced by Kellen Moore for the game and the rest of the season. In his seven starts and eight appearances, Cassel posted a 1–6 record and threw for 1,276 yards, five touchdowns, and seven interceptions.

On Cassel's last play before being benched for Moore, he became the first quarterback in over 12 years to throw an interception that was also flagged for intentional grounding. The play was designed to be a wide receiver bubble screen, but Cassel held onto the ball after a pump-fake, then turned to look at the other side of the field. Forced to scramble to get away from the immediate pressure, thanks largely to most of the Dallas offensive linemen moving to the left side of the field to block for the presumed wide receiver screen, Cassel stumbled and nearly fell over. Trying to salvage the play, Cassel threw the ball towards the right sideline. No Dallas receiver was in the area, and the ball failed to reach the sideline and was intercepted by Darrelle Revis. On top of the intentional grounding call against Cassel, there was also an illegal lineman downfield call against Dallas, as several offensive linemen had run downfield to block for what they assumed was a quick screen pass to a receiver. Both penalties were declined so that the interception would stand.

=== Tennessee Titans ===
==== 2016 season ====
Cassel signed with the Tennessee Titans on March 10, 2016.

During a Week 16 38–17 road loss to the Jacksonville Jaguars on Christmas Eve, Cassel entered the game in the third quarter after starter Marcus Mariota suffered a leg injury, completing 13-of-24 passes for 124 yards, a touchdown, and an interception. Due to Mariota's injury, Cassel started in the regular-season finale against the Houston Texans, completing 16-of-26 passes for 150 yards, a touchdown, and an interception as the Titans won 24–17.

==== 2017 season ====
On March 2, 2017, Cassel signed a two-year, $5.25 million contract extension with the Titans.

During a Week 4 57–14 road loss to the Houston Texans, Mariota suffered a hamstring injury in the third quarter and was relieved by Cassel. He finished the game completing four of 10 passes for 21 yards and two interceptions. Due to Mariota's injury, Cassel started the game against the Miami Dolphins, completing 21 of 32 passes for 141 yards and a touchdown as the Titans lost on the road by a score of 16–10.

On March 9, 2018, Cassel was released by the Titans.

=== Detroit Lions ===
On April 4, 2018, Cassel signed a one-year, $1,105,000 contract with the Detroit Lions.

During the season opener against the New York Jets, Cassel made his Lions debut coming in relief of Matthew Stafford in the 48–17 blowout loss. Cassel appeared in one other game in the 2018 season, a Week 16 27–9 loss to his former team, the Minnesota Vikings, completing five of 11 passes for 45 yards while rushing once for 14 yards.

== Career statistics ==
Legend
| | Led the league |
| **Bold** | Career high |

=== NFL ===
==== Regular season ====
| Year | Team | Games | | | Passing | | | | | | | | Rushing | | | | Sacks | | Fumbles (Note: Fumbles lost data taken from Pro Football Reference career game log) | |
| Year | Team | GP | GS | Record | Cmp | Att | Pct | Yds | Y/A | TD | Int | Rtg | Att | Yds | Avg | TD | Sck | SckY | Fum | Lost |
|---|---|---|---|---|---|---|---|---|---|---|---|---|---|---|---|---|---|---|---|---|
| 2005 | NE | 2 | 0 | – | 13 | 24 | 54.2 | 183 | **7.6** | 2 | 1 | 89.4 | 6 | 12 | 2.0 | 0 | 1 | 1 | 2 | 0 |
| 2006 | NE | 6 | 0 | – | 5 | 8 | 62.5 | 32 | 4.0 | 0 | 0 | 70.8 | 2 | 4 | 2.0 | 0 | 3 | 15 | 1 | 1 |
| 2007 | NE | 6 | 0 | – | 4 | 7 | 57.1 | 38 | 5.4 | 0 | 1 | 32.7 | 4 | 12 | 3.0 | 1 | 0 | 0 | 1 | 0 |
| 2008 | NE | 16 | 15 | **10–5** | **327** | **516** | **63.4** | **3,693** | 7.2 | 21 | 11 | 89.4 | **73** | **270** | 3.7 | **2** | **47** | 219 | 7 | 4 |
| 2009 | KC | 15 | 15 | 4–11 | 271 | 493 | 55.0 | 2,924 | 5.9 | 16 | **16** | 69.9 | 50 | 189 | 3.8 | 0 | 42 | **243** | **14** | 3 |
| 2010 | KC | 15 | 15 | **10–5** | 262 | 450 | 58.2 | 3,116 | 6.9 | **27** | 7 | **93.0** | 33 | 125 | 3.8 | 0 | 26 | 182 | 3 | 1 |
| 2011 | KC | 9 | 9 | 4–5 | 160 | 269 | 59.5 | 1,713 | 6.4 | 10 | 9 | 76.6 | 25 | 99 | 4.0 | 0 | 22 | 120 | 5 | 2 |
| 2012 | KC | 9 | 8 | 1–7 | 161 | 277 | 58.1 | 1,796 | 6.5 | 6 | 12 | 66.7 | 27 | 145 | 5.4 | 1 | 19 | 101 | 9 | **7** |
| 2013 | MIN | 9 | 6 | 3–3 | 153 | 254 | 60.2 | 1,807 | 7.1 | 11 | 9 | 81.6 | 18 | 57 | 3.2 | 1 | 16 | 85 | 3 | 1 |
| 2014 | MIN | 3 | 3 | 1–2 | 41 | 71 | 57.7 | 425 | 6.0 | 3 | 4 | 65.8 | 9 | 18 | 2.0 | 0 | 6 | 39 | 3 | 0 |
| 2015 | BUF | 1 | 1 | 1–0 | 0 | 0 | 0.0 | 0 | 0.0 | 0 | 0 | 0.0 | 0 | 0 | 0.0 | 0 | 0 | 0 | 0 | 0 |
| 2015 | DAL | 8 | 7 | 1–6 | 119 | 204 | 58.3 | 1,276 | 6.3 | 5 | 7 | 70.6 | 15 | 78 | 5.2 | 0 | 14 | 86 | 4 | 0 |
| 2016 | TEN | 4 | 1 | 1–0 | 30 | 51 | 58.8 | 284 | 5.6 | 2 | 2 | 71.0 | 4 | 3 | 0.8 | 0 | 5 | 23 | 1 | 0 |
| 2017 | TEN | 2 | 1 | 0–1 | 25 | 42 | 59.5 | 162 | 3.9 | 1 | 2 | 55.9 | 0 | 0 | 0.0 | 0 | 8 | 30 | 2 | 2 |
| 2018 | DET | 2 | 0 | – | 7 | 17 | 41.2 | 59 | 3.5 | 0 | 1 | 26.3 | 2 | 13 | **6.5** | 0 | 1 | 13 | 0 | 0 |
| Career | | 107 | 81 | 36–45 | 1,578 | 2,683 | 58.8 | 17,508 | 6.5 | 104 | 82 | 78.6 | 267 | 1,011 | 3.8 | 5 | 210 | 1,157 | 55 | 21 |

==== Postseason ====
| Year | Team | Games | | | Passing | | | | | | | | Rushing | | | | Sacks | | Fumbles | |
| Year | Team | GP | GS | Record | Cmp | Att | Pct | Yds | Y/A | TD | Int | Rtg | Att | Yds | Avg | TD | Sck | SckY | Fum | Lost |
|---|---|---|---|---|---|---|---|---|---|---|---|---|---|---|---|---|---|---|---|---|
| 2005 | NE | 1 | 0 | – | 0 | 0 | 0.0 | 0 | 0.0 | 0 | 0 | 0.0 | 1 | −1 | −1.0 | 0 | 0 | 0 | 0 | 0 |
| 2006 | NE | 3 | 0 | – | 0 | 0 | 0.0 | 0 | 0.0 | 0 | 0 | 0.0 | 0 | 0 | 0.0 | 0 | 0 | 0 | 0 | 0 |
| 2007 | NE | 0 | 0 | DNP | | | | | | | | | | | | | | | | |
| 2010 | KC | 1 | 1 | 0–1 | **9** | **18** | **50.0** | **70** | **3.9** | 0 | **3** | **20.4** | **3** | **6** | **2.0** | 0 | **3** | **17** | 0 | 0 |
| 2017 | TEN | 0 | 0 | DNP | | | | | | | | | | | | | | | | |
| Career | | 5 | 1 | 0–1 | 9 | 18 | 50.0 | 70 | 3.9 | 0 | 3 | 20.4 | 4 | 5 | 1.3 | 0 | 3 | 17 | 0 | 0 |

=== College ===
| Season | Team | GP | Passing | | | | | | | | Rushing | | | |
| Season | Team | GP | Cmp | Att | Pct | Yds | Avg | TD | Int | Rtg | Att | Yds | Avg | TD |
|---|---|---|---|---|---|---|---|---|---|---|---|---|---|---|
| 2001 | USC | 7 | 1 | 2 | 50.0 | 5 | 2.5 | 0 | 0 | 71.0 | 3 | **22** | **7.3** | 0 |
| 2002 | USC | 10 | 3 | 4 | **75.0** | 27 | 6.8 | 0 | 0 | **131.7** | 1 | 1 | 1.0 | 0 |
| 2003 | USC | 8 | 6 | 13 | 46.2 | 63 | 4.8 | 0 | 0 | 86.9 | 1 | −2 | −2.0 | 0 |
| 2004 | USC | 9 | **10** | **14** | 71.4 | **97** | **6.9** | 0 | **1** | 115.3 | **6** | 11 | 1.8 | 0 |
| Career | | 34 | 20 | 33 | 60.6 | 192 | 5.8 | 0 | 1 | 103.4 | 11 | 32 | 2.9 | 0 |

== Personal life ==
In February 2007, Cassel married his longtime girlfriend Lauren Killian, a former USC volleyball player. Carson Palmer was his best man. The couple have three children together.

Cassel's brother Jack pitched for the San Diego Padres and Houston Astros. His brother Justin pitched for the Chicago White Sox farm system for six seasons.

Cassel is the son of Emmy-winning set decorator Barbara Cassel and Greg Cassel.

On the night of January 26, 2012, a fire broke out in a family's house in the village of Loch Lloyd, Missouri. Cassel, seeing smoke from the fire, ran to their house to alert them. The family was able to make it out of the fire alive.

Since retirement, Cassel has also dedicated his time to charitable acts.

Cassel served as a football analyst for NBC Sports Boston from 2019–2023. He now works for NBC as a college analyst working on the weekly featured Big 10 Saturday night game.

Cassel currently runs a podcast with Bobby Bones titled Lots to Say with Bobby Bones and Matt Cassel. The two mostly discuss football but sometimes touch on other topics such as music and pop culture events. It also airs on the official NFL YouTube channel.
