= Bradley Randle =

American football player (born 1990)

Profile
- Position: Running back

Personal information
- Born: September 17, 1990 (age 36); Anaheim, California, U.S.
- Listed height: 5 ft 7 in (1.70 m)
- Listed weight: 190 lb (86 kg)

Career information
- High school: Vista Murrieta (Murrieta, California)
- College: UNLV
- NFL draft: 2013: undrafted

Career history
- Minnesota Vikings (2013–2014)*; BC Lions (2014); Winnipeg Blue Bombers (2015)*
- * Offseason or practice squad member only
- Stats at Pro Football Reference

Bradley Randle (born September 17, 1990) is an American former professional football running back in the National Football League (NFL) and Canadian Football League (CFL). He played college football for the UNLV Rebels.

== Professional career ==
Pre-draft measurables
Height	Weight	40-yard dash	10-yard split	20-yard split	20-yard shuttle	Three-cone drill	Vertical jump	Broad jump	Bench press
5 ft 7 in (1.70 m)	190 lb (86 kg)	4.38 s	1.58 s	2.57 s	4.17 s	7.08 s	36 in (0.91 m)	9 ft 7 in (2.92 m)	15 reps
All values from NFL Combine

=== Minnesota Vikings ===
On April 28, 2013, Randle signed with the NFL's Minnesota Vikings as an undrafted free agent. Randle was released by the Vikings on August 26, 2013 (along with 12 others) to get to a 75-man roster. On September 4, he was signed to the practice squad, and then released on September 10. Finally, Randle was re-signed to the Vikings practice squad on December 11, where he remained. Randle was released on May 13, 2014.

=== BC Lions ===
Randle was signed by the BC Lions of the CFL on September 30, 2014. He had only 2 carries during the 2014 regular season but he managed to gain 35 yards (19 and 16 yards each). He also returned 3 punts for a total of 9 yards (only 3 yards per return).

=== Winnipeg Blue Bombers ===
On March 9, 2015, Randle and the Winnipeg Blue Bombers of the Canadian Football League agreed to a contract.

== Personal life ==
Randle's father, Lenny, was a Major League Baseball player.
