= South Sequoia League =

High school athletic league in California

The South Sequoia League is a high school athletic league that is part of the CIF Central Section. It is the athletic conference for public high schools in west and north Kern County. For the 2023 football season, McFarland High School intends to leave the league and will play as an independent. The 1987 McFarland Cross Country Team was the subject of the Disney film McFarland, USA.

There is a seasonal selection of All League players in the scope of sports administered by the league.

== Members ==
- Delano High School
- Shafter High School
- McFarland High School
- Taft Union High School
- Cesar Chavez High School
- Wasco High School
- Robert F. Kennedy High School
