= 9th ALMA Awards =

2007 US film and television awards ceremony

- Date: June 1, 2007 (taping); June 5, 2007 (airing)
- Site: Pasadena Civic Auditorium, Pasadena, California
- Hosted by: Eva Longoria
- Official website: www.almaawards.com

Television coverage
- Network: ABC

The 9th ALMA Awards honors the accomplishments made by Hispanics in film and television in 2006. The awards were held in Pasadena, California, on June 1, 2007, at the Pasadena Civic Auditorium. The show was televised on ABC on June 5, 2007, at 9 p.m. EDT / 8 p.m. CDT. The show was hosted by Desperate Housewives star Eva Longoria. Performances were made by Prince, Los Lonely Boys, Beyoncé, and Calle 13. The awards show is sponsored by the National Council of La Raza.

== Winners and nominees ==
Winners are listed first and highlighted in bold.

=== Outstanding Motion Picture ===
- **Babel**
  - Bobby
  - Quinceañera

=== Outstanding Actor - Motion Picture ===
- **Jesse Garcia** – Quinceañera
  - Gael García Bernal – Babel
  - Michael Peña – World Trade Center

=== Outstanding Actress - Motion Picture ===
- **Adriana Barraza** – Babel
  - Cameron Diaz – The Holiday
  - Eva Mendes – Trust The Man
  - Emily Rios – Quinceañera

=== Outstanding Director - Motion Picture ===
- **Alejandro González Iñárritu** – Babel
  - Alfonso Cuarón – Children of Men
  - Emilio Estevez – Bobby
  - Andy García – The Lost City

=== Outstanding Screenplay - Motion Picture ===
- **Guillermo Arriaga** – Babel
  - Alfonso Cuarón, David Arata, Timothy J. Sexton, Mark Fergus, Hawk Ostby – Children of Men
  - Emilio Estevez – Bobby

=== Outstanding Television Series, Mini-Series, or TV Movie ===
- **Ugly Betty** – ABC
  - George Lopez – ABC
  - Walkout – HBO

=== Outstanding Actor - Television Series, Mini-Series, or TV Movie ===
- (tie) **Edward James Olmos** – Battlestar Galactica – Syfy
- (tie) **Michael Peña** – Walkout – HBO
  - Santiago Cabrera – Heroes – NBC
  - Miguel Ferrer – Crossing Jordan – NBC
  - Carlos Mencia – Mind of Mencia – Comedy Central

=== Outstanding Actress - Television Series, Mini-Series, or TV Movie ===
- **America Ferrera** – Ugly Betty – ABC
  - Constance Marie – George Lopez – ABC
  - Sara Ramirez – Grey's Anatomy – ABC
  - Alexa Vega – Walkout – HBO

=== Outstanding Supporting Actor - Television Series, Mini-Series, or TV Movie ===
- **Benito Martinez** – The Shield – FX
  - Yancey Arias – Walkout – HBO
  - Jorge Garcia – Lost – ABC
  - Mark Indelicato – Ugly Betty – ABC
  - Tony Plana – Ugly Betty – ABC
  - Miguel Sandoval – Medium – NBC

=== Outstanding Supporting Actress - Television Series, Mini-Series, or TV Movie ===
- **Ana Ortiz** – Ugly Betty – ABC
  - Tonantzin Esparza – "Walkout" – HBO
  - Aimee Garcia – George Lopez – ABC
  - Belita Moreno – George Lopez – ABC
  - Marisol Nichols – 24 – FOX
  - Roselyn Sanchez – Without A Trace – CBS
  - Nadine Velazquez – My Name Is Earl – NBC
  - Lauren Vélez – Dexter – Showtime

=== Outstanding Director - Television Series, Mini-Series, or TV Movie ===
- (tie) **Edward James Olmos** – Walkout – HBO
- (tie) **Kenny Ortega** –High School Musical – Disney Channel
  - Linda Mendoza – Scrubs – "My Déjà Vu, My Déjà Vu" – NBC

=== Outstanding Writer - Television Series, Mini-Series, or TV Movie ===
- **Silvio Horta** – Ugly Betty, "Pilot" – ABC
  - Marcus De Leon, Ernie Contreras, Timothy J.Sexton – Walkout– HBO
  - Adam E. Fierro, Charles H. Eglee – The Shield, "Enemy of Good" – FX
  - Dailyn Rodriguez – Ugly Betty, "After Hours" – ABC

=== Outstanding Made for TV Documentary ===
- **From Mambo to Hip Hop: A South Bronx Tale** – PBS
  - Al Otro Lado (To the Other Side) – PBS
  - Lalo Guerrero: The Original Chicano – PBS
  - Pancho Gonzalez: Warrior of the Courts – PBS
