= Ada, Nolan County, Texas =

Ghost town in Texas, US

Ada
- Ghost town
- Location in Texas
- Coordinates: 32°22′58″N 100°25′01″W
- Country: United States
- State: Texas
- County: Nolan

Ada is a ghost town in Nolan County, Texas, United States.

== History ==
Situated on Farm to Market Road 1809, it was east of the Atchison, Topeka and Santa Fe Railway and north of Lake Trammell. The Kansas City, Mexico and Orient Railway was extended through the town in the mid-to-late 1900s, after a decade of delays. The community was named for Ada Cooper, a stenographer for Irving Wheatcroft, the railroader who financed the rail extension. The Ada Common School was built there in 1899, and was consolidated by the Sweetwater Independent School District in 1941. The town was abandoned by the 1980s.
