= Joe Banyard =

American football player (born 1988)

No. 22, 23, 29, 36
- Position: Running back

Personal information
- Born: November 12, 1988 (age 37); Sweetwater, Texas, U.S.
- Listed height: 5 ft 11 in (1.80 m)
- Listed weight: 213 lb (97 kg)

Career information
- High school: Sweetwater (TX)
- College: UTEP
- NFL draft: 2012: undrafted

Career history
- Jacksonville Jaguars (2012)*; New Orleans Saints (2012)*; Minnesota Vikings (2012–2014); Jacksonville Jaguars (2015–2016); Buffalo Bills (2017)
- * Offseason or practice squad member only

Career NFL statistics
- Rushing yards: 95
- Rushing average: 4.1
- Receptions: 10
- Receiving yards: 73
- Stats at Pro Football Reference

Joseph Aaron Banyard (born November 12, 1988) is an American former professional football player who was a running back in the National Football League (NFL). He played college football at UTEP. He was signed by the Jacksonville Jaguars as an undrafted free agent in 2012. He had been a member of the New Orleans Saints and the Minnesota Vikings before returning to the Jaguars in 2015.

== Early life ==
Joseph Banyard attended Sweetwater High School in Sweetwater, Texas, where Joe played football and competed in track and powerlifting. In football, Joe earned Honorable Mention 3A All-State honors as a defensive back. As a senior in 2007, Joe switched to running back, totalling over 1,200 yards and 21 touchdowns.

Also a top competitor in track and field, Joseph Banyard was a state qualifier sprinter. In 2005, as a sophomore, Joe went to the Texas State Meet as a member of Sweetwater's relay squads; in the 4 × 100m final, Banyard ran the third leg, helping them earn a second-place finish and setting a new school-record time of 41.98 seconds. Banyard and his teammates also placed third in both the 4 × 200m and 4 × 400m relays with times of 1:27.40 and 3:19.62, respectively. Joe ran the 200-meter dash in 23.21 seconds in 2006, as a junior. As a senior, Banyard placed third in the long jump at the regional meet with a leap of 6.64 meters (21'9.5"). At the San Angelo relays, Banyard recorded a personal-best time of 50.51 seconds in the 400-meter dash.

Regarded only as a two-star recruit by Rivals.com, Banyard committed to TCU on January 21, 2007.

College recruiting
Name	Hometown	School	Height	Weight	Commit date
Joe Banyard; RB	Sweetwater, Texas	Sweetwater High School	5 ft 11 in (1.80 m)	190 lb (86 kg)	Jan 21, 2007
Joe Banyard; RB	Recruit ratings: Rivals:				
Overall recruit ranking:
‡ Refers to 40-yard dash; Note: In many cases, Scout, Rivals, 247Sports, On3, and ESPN may conflict in their listings of height, weight and 40 time.; In these cases, the average was taken. ESPN grades are on a 100-point scale.; Sources: "2008 Team Ranking". Rivals.com.

== College career ==
Banyard started his college career at TCU. Prior to his freshman season Joe transferred to Eastern New Mexico University then to UTEP. Banyard saw his first playing time his junior season. He was UTEP's leader in rushing attempts with 109. He also had 623 rushing yards and eight touchdowns.

== Professional career ==
Pre-draft measurables
Height	Weight	40-yard dash	10-yard split	20-yard split	20-yard shuttle	Three-cone drill	Vertical jump	Broad jump	Bench press
6 ft 0 in (1.83 m)	230 lb (104 kg)	4.43 s	1.47 s	2.59 s	4.29 s	7.06 s	35 1/2 in (0.90 m)	10 ft 0 in (3.05 m)	26 reps
All values from Pro Day

=== Jacksonville Jaguars ===
Banyard signed with the Jacksonville Jaguars after the 2012 NFL draft as an undrafted free agent.

=== New Orleans Saints ===
On June 7, 2012, Banyard signed a contract with the New Orleans Saints. On September 13, 2012, he was waived by the team.

=== Minnesota Vikings ===
Banyard was signed by the Minnesota Vikings, where he spent the rest of the 2012 season on the practice squad. He was released by the Vikings on August 31, 2013 (along with 18 others) to get to a 53-man roster, signed to the practice squad the following day, released again on September 4, and then re-signed to the practice squad on September 10, 2013. On December 14, 2013, Banyard was added to the Vikings active roster. On December 16, 2013, the Vikings waived Banyard, only to re-sign him to the practice squad two days later.

On August 30, 2015, Banyard was released by the Vikings.

=== Jacksonville Jaguars (second stint) ===
Banyard was signed to the Jacksonville Jaguars practice squad on October 14, 2015, after running backs Corey Grant and Bernard Pierce were placed on injured reserve for the remainder of the season. The following week, Banyard was re-signed to the active roster. After Toby Gerhart suffered an injury, Banyard was promoted to third string.

Banyard was released by the Jaguars on September 4, 2016. He was re-signed on December 27, 2016.

=== Buffalo Bills ===
On March 17, 2017, Banyard signed with the Buffalo Bills. He was released by the Bills on October 17, 2017, but was re-signed on October 28, only to be released three days later.
