= Sweetwater, Texas =

City in the United States

- City
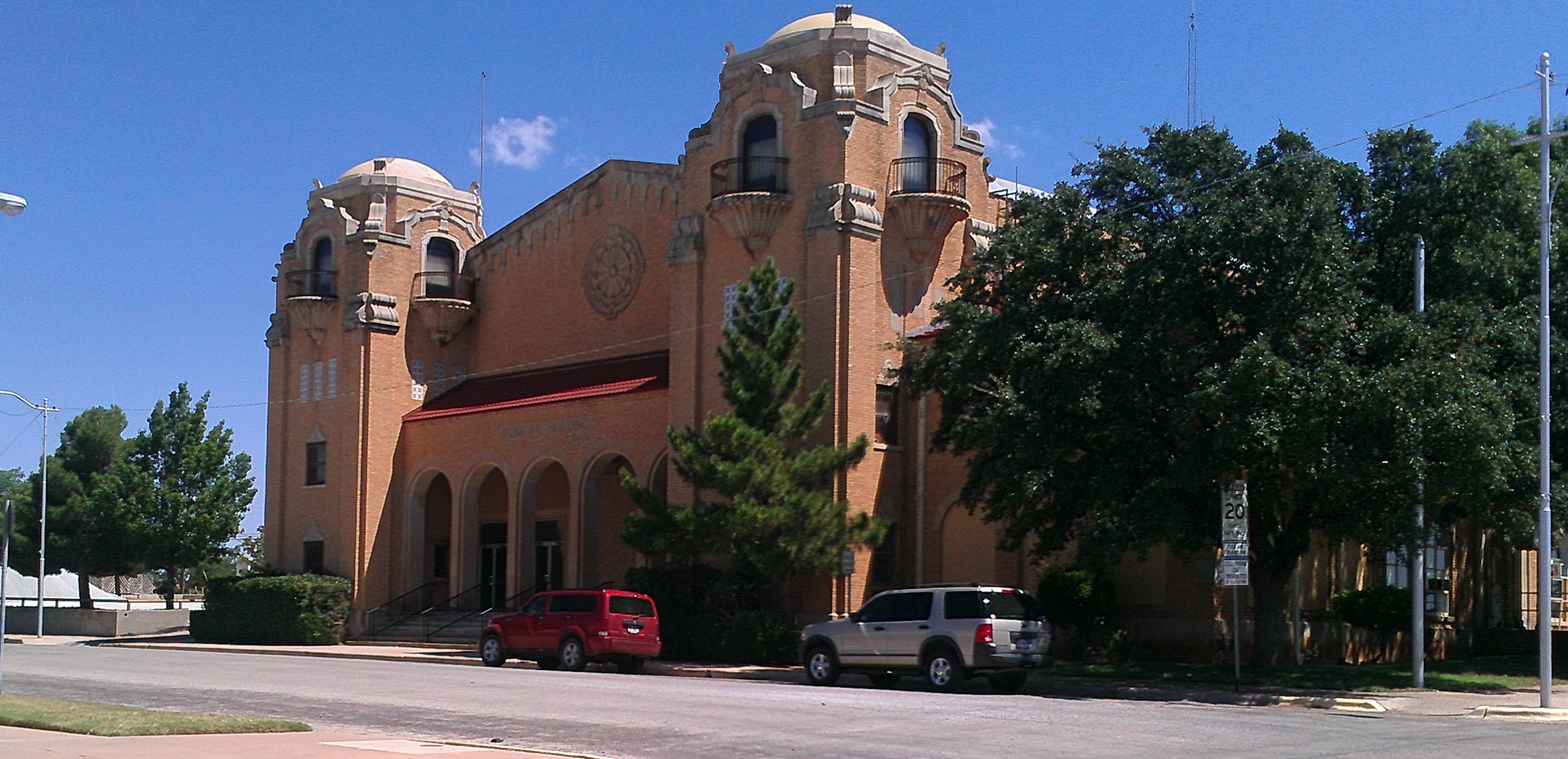
- Municipal building north of the Nolan County Courthouse.

- Flag
- Motto: "Life Is Sweet In Texas"
- Location of Sweetwater
- Coordinates: 32°29′09″N 100°24′30″W
- Country: United States
- State: Texas
- County: Nolan

Government
  - Type: Council-Manager

Area
  - Total: 11.07 sq mi (28.68 km^{2})
  - Land: 11.07 sq mi (28.68 km^{2})
  - Water: 0 sq mi (0.00 km^{2})
- Elevation: 2,175 ft (663 m)

Population (2020)
  - Total: 10,622
  - Density: 959.2/sq mi (370.4/km^{2})
- Time zone: UTC−6 (CST)
  - Summer (DST): UTC−5 (CDT)
- ZIP Code: 79556
- Area code: 325
- FIPS code: 48-71540
- GNIS ID: 2412023
- Website: City website

Sweetwater is a municipality in and the county seat of Nolan County, Texas, United States. It is 123 miles southeast of Lubbock and 40 miles west of Abilene. Its population was 10,622 at the 2020 census.

== History ==
The town's name "Sweetwater" is the English translation of the Kiowa language word "Mobeetie".

Sweetwater received a U.S. post office in 1879. The Texas and Pacific Railway arrived on March 12, 1881, beginning Sweetwater's long history as a railroad town. To encourage the railroads, Sweetwater increased its water supply by building City Lake in 1898 (now called Newman Park), and three further lakes thereafter. Construction began on the Kansas City, Mexico and Orient Railway in 1903. By 1912 the Santa Fe Railway was serving Sweetwater via its new Coleman Cutoff and completing a connection with the T&P nearby at "Tecific" junction. Businesses and homes were built along the rail lines. Texas and Pacific Railway passenger service was discontinued in 1969.

Gulf Refinery operated from 1929 to 1954, and at one time the town was a large telegraph center. The International Harvester Company operated a factory on W. Third Street in Sweetwater from 1920 to 1950. Gypsum plants, apparel manufacturers, cement plants, cotton compresses, a cottonseed oil mill, and packing companies were among the nearly 250 businesses operating there from the 1970s. Many still operate today. Sweetwater remains a production hub for such commodities as cotton, oil, and cattle. The population of Sweetwater has remained steady between 11,000 and 13,000 since 1940.

At Sweetwater during World War II, one class of British RAF pilots was trained before the airfield was converted for training American women pilots. The Women Airforce Service Pilots (WASPs) were trained under the direction of famed aviator Jacqueline Cochran at Sweetwater's Avenger Field. These WASPs were the first women to fly American military aircraft. The military airstrip was closed at the end of the war.

Pilots flying over Sweetwater can still land at Avenger Field – the Sweetwater Airport (SWW). The National WASP WWII Museum is located at Avenger Field. The WASP women were not recognized for having served in the armed forces until 1977, after U.S. Senator Barry M. Goldwater of Arizona and Colonel Bruce Arnold, late son of General Hap Arnold, gained their official recognition as military veterans. In 1970, the field was developed for Texas State Technical College in Sweetwater.

Sweetwater is also home to the Pioneer Museum, with display rooms depicting the lives of early settlers. It has extensive photograph files, farm and ranch exhibits, Indian artifacts, and WASP exhibits.

The local newspaper, Sweetwater Reporter, was founded in 1911. The newspaper, first established in 1881, was called the Sweetwater Advance. It was later published as the Nolan County Review, and became the Daily Reporter in 1911. An historic, early 20th-century, stage theater has been renovated and is in full use. The Municipal Auditorium, where Elvis Presley performed twice in 1955, continues to feature live acts. Sweetwater's Rolling Plains Memorial Hospital was founded in 1976.

Sports include access to a large public swimming pool and an 18-hole golf course (opened 1958). Public fishing and recreational facilities are located at Lake Sweetwater.

First Baptist Church had one of the earliest congregations in Sweetwater, and it continues to thrive.

Parts of the south side of Sweetwater were devastated by an estimated EF3 tornado that swept through town early in the morning of April 19, 1986.

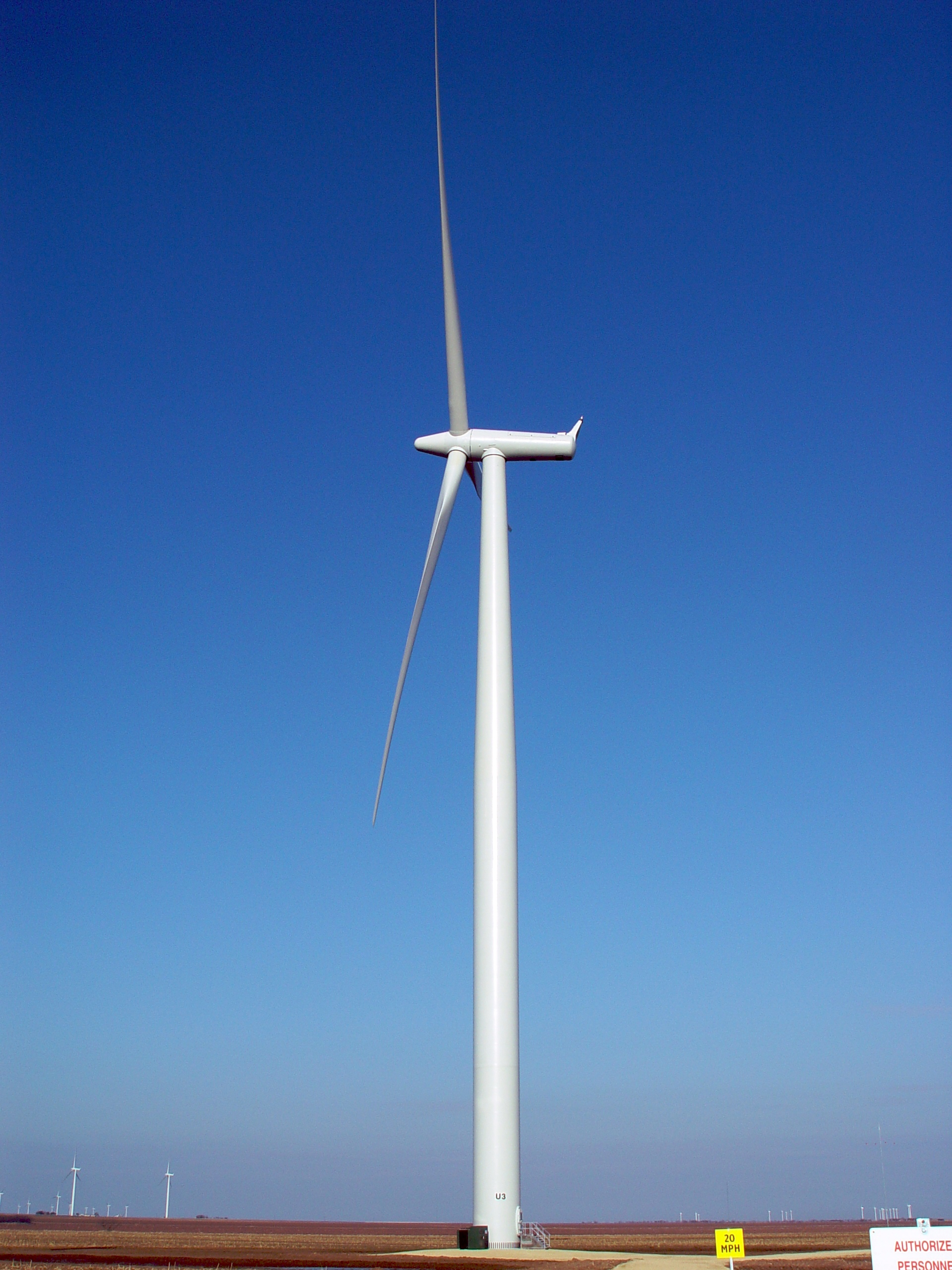
Wind turbine near Sweetwater, Texas

Sweetwater is the center of the leading wind power generation region of the Western Hemisphere. It is sometimes called the "Wind Turbine Capital of Texas". The largest wind farm in Texas is Roscoe Wind Farm. In 2009 about 1,330 direct wind-related jobs were created in Nolan County alone, where the industry generated almost $18,000,000 in annual landowner royalties and over $12,000,000 in annual local school taxes (2007).

Special events include the world's largest rattlesnake round-up, held annually since 1958 by the Sweetwater Jaycees on the second weekend in March. It is held along with a gun and coin show hosted by the Sweetwater Rifle and Pistol Club, which was founded in the 1940s.

== Geography ==
According to the United States Census Bureau, in 2020, the city had a total land area of 11.07 sq mi (28.7 km^{2}), all land.

Sweetwater is the center of the Western Hemisphere's leading wind power generation region and West Texas has more than 4,000 megawatts of operational wind energy. Nolan County alone would currently rank as the eighth-largest "nation" in terms of wind energy generation - with more than 1,500 MW installed.

=== Climate ===
The climate type in the Sweetwater area occurs primarily on the periphery of the true deserts in low-latitude semiarid steppe regions. The Köppen climate classification subtype for this climate is BSk (tropical and subtropical steppe climate).

== Demographics ==
Historical population
Census	Pop.	Note	%±
1890	614		—
1900	670		9.1%
1910	4,176		523.3%
1920	4,307		3.1%
1930	10,848		151.9%
1940	10,367		−4.4%
1950	13,619		31.4%
1960	13,914		2.2%
1970	12,020		−13.6%
1980	12,242		1.8%
1990	11,967		−2.2%
2000	11,415		−4.6%
2010	10,906		−4.5%
2020	10,622		−2.6%
U.S. Decennial Census

=== 2020 census ===
As of the 2020 census, Sweetwater had a population of 10,622 people, 4,199 households, and 2,464 families.

The median age was 38.3 years. 26.1% of residents were under the age of 18 and 18.4% of residents were 65 years of age or older.

For every 100 females there were 96.2 males, and for every 100 females age 18 and over there were 92.3 males age 18 and over.

97.5% of residents lived in urban areas, while 2.5% lived in rural areas.

There were 4,199 households in Sweetwater, of which 31.8% had children under the age of 18 living in them. Of all households, 39.9% were married-couple households, 21.7% were households with a male householder and no spouse or partner present, and 31.6% were households with a female householder and no spouse or partner present. About 33.0% of all households were made up of individuals and 14.8% had someone living alone who was 65 years of age or older.

There were 5,130 housing units, of which 18.1% were vacant. The homeowner vacancy rate was 3.4% and the rental vacancy rate was 18.3%.

Sweetwater racial composition (NH = Non-Hispanic) (Note: Note: the US Census treats Hispanic/Latino as an ethnic category. This table excludes Latinos from the racial categories and assigns them to a separate category. Hispanics/Latinos can be of any race.)
Race	Number	Percentage
White (NH)	5,158	48.56%
Black or African American (NH)	592	5.57%
Native American or Alaska Native (NH)	24	0.23%
Asian (NH)	93	0.88%
Pacific Islander (NH)	2	0.02%
Some other race (NH)	22	0.21%
Mixed/multiracial (NH)	320	3.01%
Hispanic or Latino	4,411	41.53%
Total	10,622	

Racial composition as of the 2020 census
Race	Number	Percent
White	6,908	65.0%
Black or African American	674	6.3%
American Indian and Alaska Native	68	0.6%
Asian	94	0.9%
Native Hawaiian and Other Pacific Islander	5	0.0%
Some other race	1,266	11.9%
Two or more races	1,607	15.1%
Hispanic or Latino (of any race)	4,411	41.5%

=== 2000 census ===
As of the census of 2000, 11,415 people, 4,545 households, and 3,017 families resided in the city. The population density was 1,139.4 people/sq mi (439.9/km^{2}). The 5,202 housing units averaged 319.2/sq mi (200.4/km^{2}). The racial makeup of the city was 75.29% White, 5.83% African American, 0.58% Native American, 0.32% Asian, 0.07% Pacific Islander, 15.71% from other races, and 2.21% from two or more races. Hispanics or Latinos of any race were 31.70% of the population.

In the city, the population was distributed as 28.1% under 18, 8.9% from 18 to 24, 26.0% from 25 to 44, 21.1% from 45 to 64, and 15.8% who were 65 years of age or older. The median age was 36 years. For every 100 females, there were 91.1 males. For every 100 females age 18 and over, there were 86.7 males.

The median income for a household in the city was $24,293, and for a family was $29,953. Males had a median income of $27,722 versus $18,064 for females. The per capita income for the city was $13,065. About 20.5% of families and 23.7% of the population were below the poverty line, including 31.5% of those under age 18 and 22.0% of those age 65 or over.

== Education ==
The City of Sweetwater is served by the Sweetwater Independent School District, which includes J.P.Cowen Early Childhood Center, East Ridge Elementary, Southeast Elementary, Sweetwater Intermediate School, Sweetwater Middle School, and Sweetwater High School. For more information about Sweetwater ISD, visit the official SISD website.

Sweetwater is the home of the West Texas campus of the Texas State Technical College System, which added the first community college wind-energy program in Texas in 2007. Also in 2007, TSTC constructed a demonstration 2 MW 60 Hz DeWind D8.2 prototype wind turbine for student training.

== Notable people ==
- Joe Banyard, former NFL player for the Jacksonville Jaguars, New Orleans Saints, Minnesota Vikings, and Buffalo Bills
- Sammy Baugh, Hall of Fame NFL and TCU football player
- Doyle Brunson, the poker legend called "Texas Dolly"
- Frank Hamer, a Texas Ranger who, along with his brother Gus, had a pistol fight in Sweetwater with Gee McMeans
- John Layfield, retired professional wrestler
- Blackjack Mulligan, retired professional wrestler
- Jack Roberts (1910-1988) was a United States federal judge of U.S. District Court for the Western District of Texas.
- Tex Robertson, University of Texas swimming coach, was born in Sweetwater.
- Zollie Coffer Steakley, Jr., Texas Secretary of State and Texas Supreme Court, practiced law in Sweetwater during the 1930s.
- Clyde "Bulldog" Turner, a graduate of Sweetwater High School, is a member of the Pro Football Hall of Fame.
- James White, high-school cross-country coach at McFarland High School.
- Barry Windham is a retired professional wrestler.
- Bobby Witcher, amateur herpetologist best known carefree handling of venomous snakes, born in Sweetwater

== Recreation ==
- Newman Field, ballpark
