= McFarland, California =

City in California, United States

- City
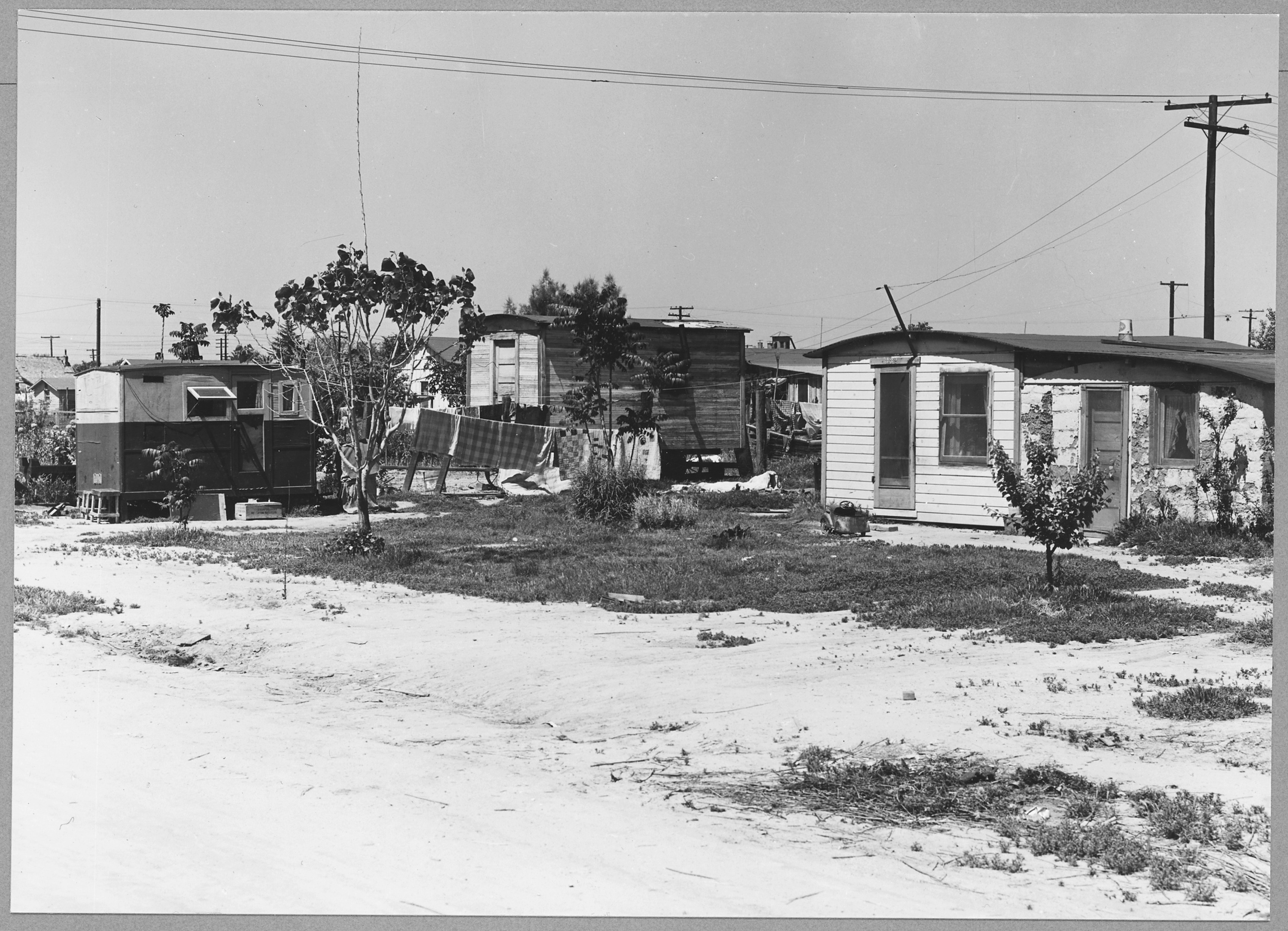
- McFarland in 1940
- Interactive map of McFarland, California
- Location within California Location within the United States
- Coordinates: 35°40′41″N 119°13′45″W
- Country: United States
- State: California
- County: Kern
- Founded: 1909
- Incorporated: July 18, 1957
- Named for: James Boyd McFarland

Government
  - Mayor: Saul Ayon
  - State Senator: Melissa Hurtado (D)
  - State Assembly: Jasmeet Bains (D)
  - U. S. Congress: David Valadao (R)

Area
  - Total: 2.68 sq mi (6.93 km^{2})
  - Land: 2.68 sq mi (6.93 km^{2})
  - Water: 0 sq mi (0.00 km^{2}) 0%
- Elevation: 354 ft (108 m)

Population (2020)
  - Total: 14,161
  - Density: 5,290/sq mi (2,040/km^{2})
- Time zone: UTC-08:00 (PST)
  - Summer (DST): UTC-07:00 (PDT)
- ZIP code: 93250
- Area code: 661
- FIPS code: 06-44826
- GNIS feature IDs: 1652750, 2411062
- Website: www.mcfarlandcity.org

McFarland (formerly, Hunt and Lone Pine) is a city in the San Joaquin Valley, in Kern County, California, United States. It is located 25 miles (40 km) northwest of Bakersfield and 6.5 miles (10 km) south of Delano, at an elevation of 354 feet (108 m). The population of McFarland was 14,161 at the 2020 census, up from 12,707 at the 2010 census.

== History ==
In the early 1900s, an educator named James Boyd McFarland moved to the Anaheim area from Zanesville, Ohio, to try his hand at real estate and walnut farming.

McFarland visited Kern County in 1907 and was impressed with the land's crop-growing potential near a community called Hunt's Siding, which was a small agriculture and livestock-based community that served about 50 families. With help from Bakersfield real estate businessman William Laird, McFarland bought 50 acres at the location of what is now McFarland.

The first post office opened in 1908. The town was founded in 1909 (and later became incorporated in 1957). McFarland grew tremendously during the Great Depression of the 1930s, then the population tapered off during World War II.

In 1950, the Highway 99 expressway and later freeway (then U.S. Route 99), the major corridor of the Central Valley, was constructed, which ended up dividing the town into an east side and west side. McFarland was incorporated as a city in the summer of 1957. The name honors J.B. McFarland, the city's founder.

In 2009 the city re-established its police force after decades of relying on the Kern County Sheriff.

In 2015, the movie McFarland, USA was released, based on a true story that occurred at McFarland High School. McFarland, USA follows the McFarland Cross Country team and their coach James White (portrayed by Kevin Costner). The cross country team would go on to win nine state titles in 14 years.

== Demographics ==
Historical population
Census	Pop.	Note	%±
1950	2,183		—
1960	3,686		68.9%
1970	4,177		13.3%
1980	5,151		23.3%
1990	7,005		36.0%
2000	9,618		37.3%
2010	12,707		32.1%
2020	14,161		11.4%
U.S. Decennial Census

McFarland first appeared as an unincorporated community in the 1950 U.S. census; and then as a city in the 1960 U.S. census

=== Racial and ethnic composition ===
McFarland city, California – Racial and ethnic composition Note: the US Census treats Hispanic/Latino as an ethnic category. This table excludes Latinos from the racial categories and assigns them to a separate category. Hispanics/Latinos may be of any race.
Race / Ethnicity (NH = Non-Hispanic)	Pop 2000	Pop 2010	Pop 2020	% 2000	% 2010	% 2020
White alone (NH)	977	743	421	10.16%	5.85%	2.97%
Black or African American alone (NH)	273	171	78	2.84%	1.35%	0.55%
Native American or Alaska Native alone (NH)	31	13	17	0.32%	0.10%	0.12%
Asian alone (NH)	56	68	115	0.58%	0.54%	0.81%
Native Hawaiian or Pacific Islander alone (NH)	8	5	3	0.08%	0.04%	0.02%
Other race alone (NH)	15	61	36	0.16%	0.48%	0.25%
Mixed race or Multiracial (NH)	19	21	40	0.20%	0.17%	0.28%
Hispanic or Latino (any race)	8,239	11,625	13,451	85.66%	91.49%	94.99%
Total	9,618	12,707	14,161	100.00%	100.00%	100.00%

=== 2020 census ===
As of the 2020 census, McFarland had a population of 14,161 and a population density of 5,289.9 inhabitants per square mile (2,042.4/km^{2}). The median age was 27.6 years. The age distribution was 34.2% under the age of 18, 11.8% aged 18 to 24, 28.5% aged 25 to 44, 18.7% aged 45 to 64, and 6.8% who were 65 years of age or older. For every 100 females, there were 99.5 males, and for every 100 females age 18 and over, there were 98.3 males age 18 and over.

The census reported that 97.2% of the population lived in households, 0.1% lived in non-institutionalized group quarters, and 2.7% were institutionalized. In addition, 99.9% of residents lived in urban areas, while 0.1% lived in rural areas.

There were 3,345 households, out of which 63.9% included children under the age of 18, 57.8% were married-couple households, 8.4% were cohabiting couple households, 22.3% had a female householder with no spouse or partner present, and 11.4% had a male householder with no spouse or partner present. About 7.1% of households were one person, and 2.4% were one person aged 65 or older. The average household size was 4.12. There were 2,997 families (89.6% of all households).

There were 3,412 housing units at an average density of 1,274.6 units per square mile (492.1 units/km^{2}), of which 3,345 (98.0%) were occupied. Of these, 57.6% were owner-occupied and 42.4% were occupied by renters. The homeowner vacancy rate was 0.8% and the rental vacancy rate was 1.9%.

=== 2023 ACS estimates ===
In 2023, the US Census Bureau estimated that 27.6% of the population were foreign-born. Of all people aged 5 or older, 29.0% spoke only English at home, 70.2% spoke Spanish, 0.0% spoke other Indo-European languages, 0.2% spoke Asian or Pacific Islander languages, and 0.6% spoke other languages. Of those aged 25 or older, 57.8% were high school graduates and 4.1% had a bachelor's degree.

The median household income in 2023 was $51,801, and the per capita income was $16,525. About 24.9% of families and 27.5% of the population were below the poverty line.

=== 2010 census ===
At the 2010 census McFarland had a population of 12,707. The population density was 4,762.7 inhabitants per square mile (1,838.9/km^{2}). The racial makeup of McFarland was 5,433 (42.8%) White, 236 (1.9%) African American, 171 (1.3%) Native American, 84 (0.7%) Asian, 6 (0.0%) Pacific Islander, 6,330 (49.8%) from other races, and 447 (3.5%) from two or more races. Hispanic or Latino of any race were 11,625 people (91.5%).

The census reported that 11,486 people (90.4% of the population) lived in households, 27 (0.2%) lived in non-institutionalized group quarters, and 1,194 (9.4%) were institutionalized.

There were 2,599 households, 1,818 (69.9%) had children under the age of 18 living in them, 1,663 (64.0%) were opposite-sex married couples living together, 456 (17.5%) had a female householder with no husband present, 246 (9.5%) had a male householder with no wife present. There were 189 (7.3%) unmarried opposite-sex partnerships, and 14 (0.5%) same-sex married couples or partnerships. 170 households (6.5%) were one person and 71 (2.7%) had someone living alone who was 65 or older. The average household size was 4.42. There were 2,365 families (91.0% of households); the average family size was 4.51.

The age distribution was 4,468 people (35.2%) under the age of 18, 1,700 people (13.4%) aged 18 to 24, 4,030 people (31.7%) aged 25 to 44, 1,925 people (15.1%) aged 45 to 64, and 584 people (4.6%) who were 65 or older. The median age was 25.7 years. For every 100 females, there were 128.3 males. For every 100 females age 18 and over, there were 142.4 males.

There were 2,683 housing units at an average density of 1,005.6 per square mile, of the occupied units 1,488 (57.3%) were owner-occupied and 1,111 (42.7%) were rented. The homeowner vacancy rate was 0.9%; the rental vacancy rate was 2.6%. 6,519 people (51.3% of the population) lived in owner-occupied housing units and 4,967 people (39.1%) lived in rental housing units.

== Local parks ==
- Arturo J. Munoz Park
- Ritchey Park
- McFarland Park
- Browning Road Park
- Blanco Park

== Schools ==
- Kern Avenue Elementary School
- Browning Road Elementary School
- McFarland Middle School
- McFarland High School
- San Joaquin High School (continuation)
- McFarland Independent School
- Horizon Elementary

== Churches ==
- Sherwood Avenue Baptist Church
- Saint Elizabeth Catholic Church
- El Buen Pastor Church
- Iglesia Ni Cristo
- Jehovah's Witnesses 124
- Church of the Living Savior
- Church of Jesus Christ of Latter-day Saints
- Mcfarland Apostolic Assembly
- CrossPointe Baptist Church McFarland
