= Bettina Gilois =

American screenwriter (1961–2020)

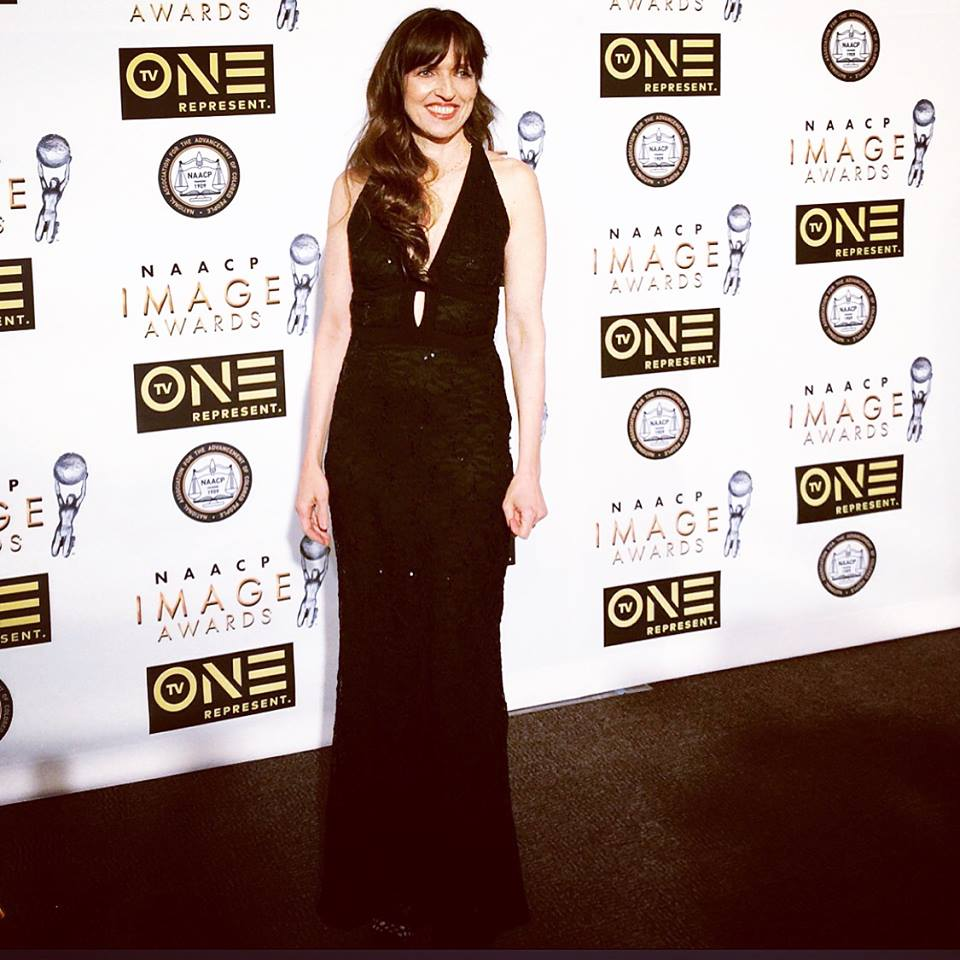
- Gilois at the 47th NAACP Image Awards in 2016
- Born: July 9, 1961; West Berlin, West Germany
- Died: July 5, 2020 (aged 58); Los Angeles, California, U.S.
- Education: Barnard College (1985)
- Occupations: Screenwriter, author
- Writing career
- Notable works: Bessie (2015); McFarland, USA (2015); Glory Road (2006)
- Notable awards: Critics Choice Award, Emmy nomination

Bettina Gilois (July 9, 1961 – July 5, 2020) was a German-American screenwriter and author, known for her work on the HBO film Bessie, and Disney's Glory Road and McFarland, USA. Gilois won an Emmy Nomination for Outstanding Writing of a Television Movie and a Black Reel Awards of 2016 nomination for Bessie. She also won two Image Award nominations for Bessie and McFarland, USA. Gilois was a Humanitas Prize nominee in 2006 and a Black Reel Awards of 2007 nominee for Glory Road.

Gilois was an associate professor in the Lawrence and Kristina Dodge College of Film and Media Arts at Chapman University.

== Biography ==
Gilois graduated from Barnard College of Columbia University with an art history degree in 1985. She was hired as director Slava Tsukerman's assistant in the independent science fiction film, Liquid Sky. She later worked at Andy Warhol's Factory in New York on the television series Andy Warhol's Fifteen Minutes. Gilois began her screenwriting career working with Joel Silver and Warner Bros.

Gilois was co-screenwriter with Christopher Cleveland on the Disney film, Glory Road (2006). The film was based on a true story about Texas Western's men's basketball coach Don Haskins, and his first all African-American starting lineup and their journey to the 1966 NCAA Championship.

Gilois co-wrote the screenplay for the HBO television movie, Bessie (2015) with director Dee Rees and Christopher Cleveland. The film, starring Queen Latifah, is the life story of blues singer Bessie Smith. Gilois and her co-writers won an Emmy Nomination for Outstanding Writing of a Television Movie, a Black Reel Awards of 2016 nomination and two Image Award nominations for their work. She worked on the Disney film McFarland, USA along with screenwriters Christopher Cleveland and Grant Thompson. The sports drama centers around a 1987 Central Valley, California high school cross-country team. The coach, played by Kevin Costner, along with multiple challenges, leads his Hispanic runners to a state championship.

Gilois later worked on a series based on Rick Hall's autobiography: The Man From Muscle Shoals: My Journey from Shame to Fame and a 2020 television movie for Lifetime.

Gilois was co-author of the books Mi Vida Loca: The Crazy Life of Johnny Tapia and Billion Dollar Painter: The Triumph and Tragedy of Thomas Kinkade Painter of Light. She also wrote for the Huffington Post in the Arts and Culture section.

== Death ==
Gilois died in her sleep on July 5, 2020, four days before her 59th birthday. She had been suffering from an advanced cancer.

== Film and television ==
Year	Film	Role	Notes	Ref
1999	The Hurricane	Writer	Uncredited	
2001	The Mists of Avalon	Writer	Uncredited	
2006	Glory Road	Screenwriter	Humanitas Prize nomination Black Reel Awards of 2007 nomination	
2015	Bessie	Screenwriter	Emmy Nomination for Outstanding Writing; Critics' Choice Television Awards winner NAACP Image Award nomination Black Reel Awards of 2016 nomination	
2015	McFarland, USA	Screenwriter	NAACP Image Award nomination	
2017	The Lost Wife of Robert Durst	Screenwriter	Lifetime TV movie	
2020	Muscle Shoals	Writer/Creator	ABC television series in production	
2020	Robin Roberts Presents: Mahalia	Writer	Lifetime television movie in production	
2021	A Million Miles Away	Writer	Netflix television movie in production	

== Selected publications ==
- Gilois, Bettina; Kuskey, G. Eric (2014). Billion Dollar Painter: The Triumph and Tragedy of Thomas Kinkade Painter of Light. Hachette Books. p. 298. ISBN 978-1602862449.
- Gilois, Bettina; Tapia, Johnny (2010). Mi Vida Loca: The Crazy and Unbelievable Life of Johnny Tapia by Johnny Tapia. Volt Press. p. 308. ISBN 9781630761103.
