= Bobby Witcher =

American herpetologist (1916–1966)

Bobby Witcher (1916–1966) was an American herpetologist best known for his carefree handling of venomous snakes.

== Life ==
Born in Sweetwater, Texas in 1916, he was loved for his contagious enthusiasm for reptiles and amphibians.

Bobby collected in the field for many years and freely shared his knowledge of herpetology. Although he never published any articles, many of his discoveries and observations have been included in the works of others. Bobby died in 1966 from a cottonmouth bite in the swamps of the Mingo National Wildlife Refuge in southeastern Missouri.

== Legacy ==
Bobby's legacy has been established through the Bobby Witcher Society, with chapters throughout the United States, and the Bobby Witcher Memorial Scholarship*, both of which were founded by Drs. Metter and Carl Gerhardt, with support from Paul Brown, one of Metter's graduate students. Dr. Robert Powell, another of Metter's students, honored Bobby by naming the herpetology collection at Avila University (Kansas City), the Bobby Witcher Memorial Collection. Eimeria witcheri, a coccidian parasite of the worm lizard, Amphisbaena manni, was named in honor of Bobby. Bobby's legacy has inspired many herpetologists, and his scholarship has benefited numerous students.

- After Dr. Metter's death in 2001, the Bobby Witcher Memorial Scholarship became the Dean E. Metter Memorial Award, which is administered by the Society for the Study of Amphibians and Reptiles.
