= Sweetwater High School (Texas) =

Location
- 1205 Ragland St. Sweetwater, Texas 79556-2438; United States
- Coordinates: 32.4805°N 100.4054°W

Information
- School type: Public high school
- School district: Sweetwater Independent School District
- Principal: Scott Cottenoir
- Teaching staff: 42.62 (on an FTE basis)
- Grades: 9-12
- Enrollment: 523 (2023–2024)
- Student to teacher ratio: 12.27
- Colors: Red & White
- Athletics conference: UIL Class AAA
- Mascot: Mustang
- Website: Sweetwater High School

Sweetwater High School is a public high school located in Sweetwater, Texas, USA and classified as a 3A school by the UIL. It is a part of the Sweetwater Independent School District located in north central Nolan County. In 2015, the school was rated "Met Standard" by the Texas Education Agency. The first high school in Sweetwater, Texas opened in 1912, and was called, "Sweetwater High School." It stood on the southwest corner of the campus. In 1927, a new high school building, called "Newman High School", opened. The school building stood on the southeast side of the campus, adjacent to the Sweetwater High School structure built in 1912. Also in 1927, the high school's mascot changed from the Salty Pups to the Sweetwater Mustangs. In 1967, a new high school building called, "Sweetwater High School" was completed right behind Newman High School. Soon after the new Sweetwater High School opened, the Newman High School building was razed.

Newman/Sweetwater High School is one of only a handful of high schools in the country with two alumni in the Pro Football Hall of Fame: Sammy Baugh and Clyde "Bulldog" Turner.

== Athletics ==
The Sweetwater Mustangs compete in these sports:

Volleyball, Cross Country, Football, Basketball, Powerlifting, Golf, Tennis, Track, Baseball, Soccer and Softball.

Sweetwater High School's Mustangs Football teams play in the Mustang Bowl, built in the 1930s by the Civilian Conservation Corps. The Mustang Bowl opened for its first game against the Brownwood Lions on September 15, 1939.

Sweetwater's football tradition has produced 690 wins, fourth-most all-time in Texas class 3A rankings.

=== State titles ===
- Football –
  - 1985(4A)
- Boys Golf –
  - 1972(3A), 1973(3A), 2001(3A)
- Girls Golf –
  - 2026(3A)
- Girls Track –
  - 1984(4A)

== Notable alumni ==
- Willie Amos, CFL player of the Edmonton Eskimos
- Sammy Baugh, Known as "Slingin'" Sammy Baugh, played college football for Texas Christian University and professionally for the Washington Redskins (1937–1952). Member of the Pro Football Hall of Fame.
- John Layfield, WWE/WCW Wrestler
- Charles Perry, Republican member of the Texas House from Lubbock, graduated from Sweetwater High School in 1980.
- Clyde "Bulldog" Turner, Played college football for Hardin-Simmons in Abilene and professionally for the Chicago Bears. Member of the Pro Football Hall of Fame.
- Doyle Brunson, Professional poker player, winner of 10 WSOP bracelets
