= Micah Albert =

American photojournalist

Micah Luke Albert (born January 2, 1979) is an American photojournalist who is represented by Redux Pictures in New York City. Based in California, he typically covers under-reported foreign affairs issues in Africa and the Middle East, but also works on assignments in the United States and Mexico. After being a grantee recipient from the Pulitzer Center on Crisis Reporting, Albert went on to win a World Press Photo award in 2013 for his coverage and investigation of the largest trash dumpsite in the world in Nairobi, Kenya.

== Education ==
Albert graduated from Wasco Union High School in Wasco, California in 1997 and went on to Point Loma Nazarene University in San Diego, where he earned a degree in graphic communications.

== Career ==
Along with David Conrad, with whom he often works, Albert captured the intensity of southern Algeria and the insecurity of the region, as well as the role of the Sahrawi Arab Democratic Republic's rebels and the influence of Al Qaeda in the region and published a long-form piece with Foreign Policy Magazine. Albert also worked in Yemen in 2009 during the global food crisis and again in 2011 during the Arab Spring, in Kenya during the post-election unrest in 2007, and in South Sudan during the end of the civil war there. Additionally, he has worked in Syria, Jordan, Saudi Arabia, Sudan, Chad, DR Congo, Tanzania, Central African Republic and many others. Albert also works as a photographer within the Americana music genre and has worked with acts such as Roger Clyne and the Peacemakers, Jeffrey Foucault, Brian Whelan, Caitlin Canty, David Ramirez, Rod Melencon, Johnny Hickman, Kris Delmhorst and others.

Albert has been married to Lindsey Albert since 2001. They have a daughter and a son.
