= Wasco Union High School =

- Wasco Union High School logo

Location
- 1900 7th Street; Wasco, California 93280; United States

Information
- Type: Public
- Motto: Current Motto: "Educational Excellence for All" Former Motto: "Raising Expectations... Broadening Horizons"
- Opened: 1915
- School district: Wasco Union High School District
- Principal: Rusvel Prado
- Teaching staff: 81.54 (FTE)
- Grades: 9-12
- Enrollment: 1,693 (2023–2024)
- Student to teacher ratio: 20.76
- Campus type: Rural
- Colors: Black, orange, white
- Team name: Tigers
- Rival: Shafter High School
- Website: WUHS homepage

Wasco Union High School (WUHS) is a public American senior high school in Wasco, California. The school is part of the Wasco Union High School District and takes in incoming freshmen from the Wasco Union School District, Maple School District, Lost Hills Union School District, Semitropic School District, St. John's Catholic School, and North Kern Christian School.

The school's auditorium is the City of Wasco's only listing on the National Register of Historic Places.

== History ==
WUHS was established in 1914 when the voters of the Cleveland, Maple, Poplar, Wildwood, Semitropic and Wasco elementary school districts approved the formation of a high school, to coincide with the new addition of the Wasco Union High School District that year. In the inaugural year, 28 students were enrolled at WUHS, and classes were held in a rented auditorium-like building called Wasco Hall. In August 1916, a new high school building for WUHS was approved; it was completed within six months and cost about $50,000. 69 students were enrolled at the time of the dedication on March 3, 1917. After 1917, as new structures were added to the campus, the original building was referred to simply as the Main Building.

In the years following, a host of new buildings were added to the campus: an industrial arts building in 1925, an auditorium in 1929, a gymnasium in 1931, an agricultural addition to the industrial arts building in 1934, the first phase of the science building in 1935, and the second phase in 1939. A cafeteria and a language arts building were added in 1949, a library and a music building in 1953, a new classroom building and a bus garage in 1957, and a new administration building in 1959.

In recent years, WUHS has undergone tremendous change. For instance, the enrollment pattern from the 1925-1926 school year through the 2005-2006 school year showed the school's student body expanding every decade (aside from 1975-1976 school year through 1985-1986), which is revealed in the following figures, given in ten year increments: 1925-1926 (143 students); 1935-1936 (299 students); 1945-1946 (385 students); 1955-1956 (546 students); 1965-1966 (879 students); 1975-1976 (869 students); 1985-1986 (854 students); 1995-1996 (960 students) and 2005-2006 (1,551 students). This led to an increase in student enrollment and, should the Wasco Union High School District sustain its present rate of growth, projections indicate that the enrollment at WUHS would reach 2,200 students by 2010. This led the district to begin preliminary planning for a second comprehensive high school to take in the influx of students within the district.

=== Auditorium ===
- Wasco Union High School Auditorium
- U.S. National Register of Historic Places
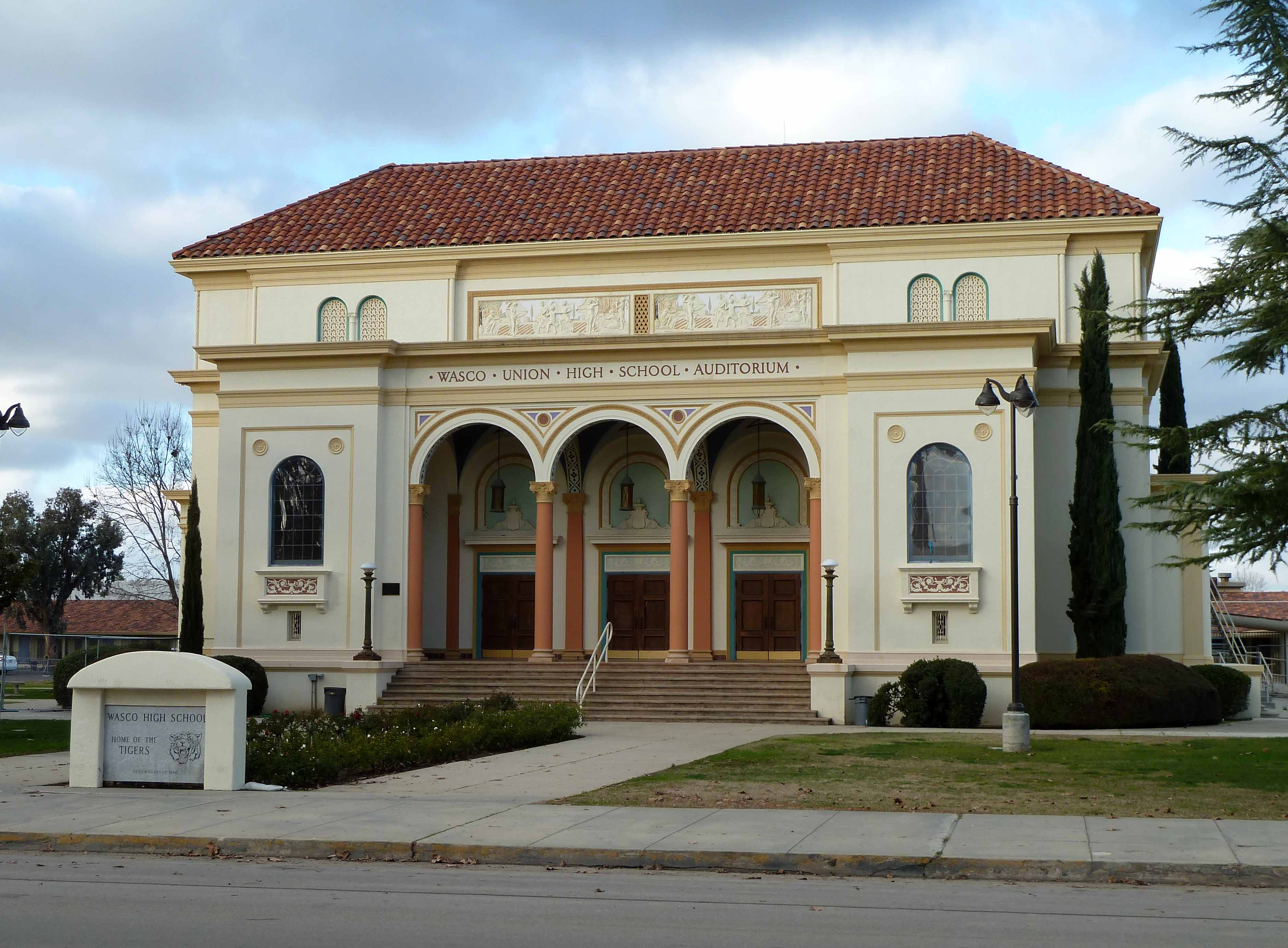

- Location within California Location within the United States
- Location: 1900 Seventh St., Wasco, California
- Coordinates: 35°35′41″N 119°20′44″W
- Area: less than one acre
- Built: 1929
- Architect: multiple
- Architectural style: Renaissance
- NRHP reference No.: 97001188
- Added to NRHP: September 30, 1997

The school's auditorium is the oldest building on its campus. The Renaissance Revival auditorium was designed by Ernest J. Kump. In addition to school performances, the building also hosts social events and visiting musicians, performers, and preachers. The auditorium was listed on the National Register of Historic Places in 1997.

== Academics ==
All students enrolled at WUHS must at least meet the following criteria before graduation:

- 4 years of English (40 credits)
- 3 years of Math (30 credits)
- 2 years of Science (20 credits)
- 2 years of P.E. (20 credits)
- 1 year of U.S. History (10 credits)
- 1 year of World History (10 credits)
- 1 year of Government/Economics (10 credits)
- 1 year of Fine Arts (10 credits)
- 1 year of Freshman Reqs. (10 credits)
- 60 credits of electives

In total, 220 credits are necessary for a student at WUHS to graduate. Every student who graduates must pass an approved Algebra course.

Because WUHS is situated in a largely rural community, the school has for many years offered a program that places heavy emphasis on the development of both vocational and agricultural skills. Agriculture remains a major element of the school's curriculum, as evidenced by the fact that some 500 WUHS students take agriculture related course work. Agriculture students have an opportunity to learn the practical aspects of agriculture on the district's 110-acre (0.45 km^{2}) school farm, which operates in conjunction with a 10-acre (40,000 m^{2}) farm lab where instruction is provided in welding, agricultural mechanics, plant science, and animal care.

In addition, WUHS provides the following advanced courses for those who want a challenge and/or want to get college credit:

- AP Biology
- AP Calculus AB
- AP English Language and Composition
- AP English Literature and Composition
- AP Spanish Language
- AP Spanish Literature
- AP World History
- AP U.S. History

== Athletics ==
The athletic director for WUHS is Joshua Huddleston. WUHS sports teams are called the Tigers, and have their home games on campus. The Tigers participate in the South Sequoia League CIF Central Section and have varsity and JV teams. Below are all the sports that WUHS participates in and their respective season:

Fall

- Cross country
- Football
- Girls' golf
- Girls' tennis
- Girls' volleyball

Winter

- Boys' basketball
- Boys' soccer
- Girls' basketball
- Girls' soccer
- Wrestling

Spring

- Baseball
- Boys' golf
- Boys' tennis
- Softball
- Swimming
- Track & field

== Notable alumni ==
- Gordon L. Park, member of the Wyoming House of Representatives from 1993–1996
- Micah Albert, photojournalist

== See also ==
- California Historical Landmarks in Kern County, California
- National Register of Historic Places listings in Kern County, California
