= Michael Peña =

American actor (born 1976)

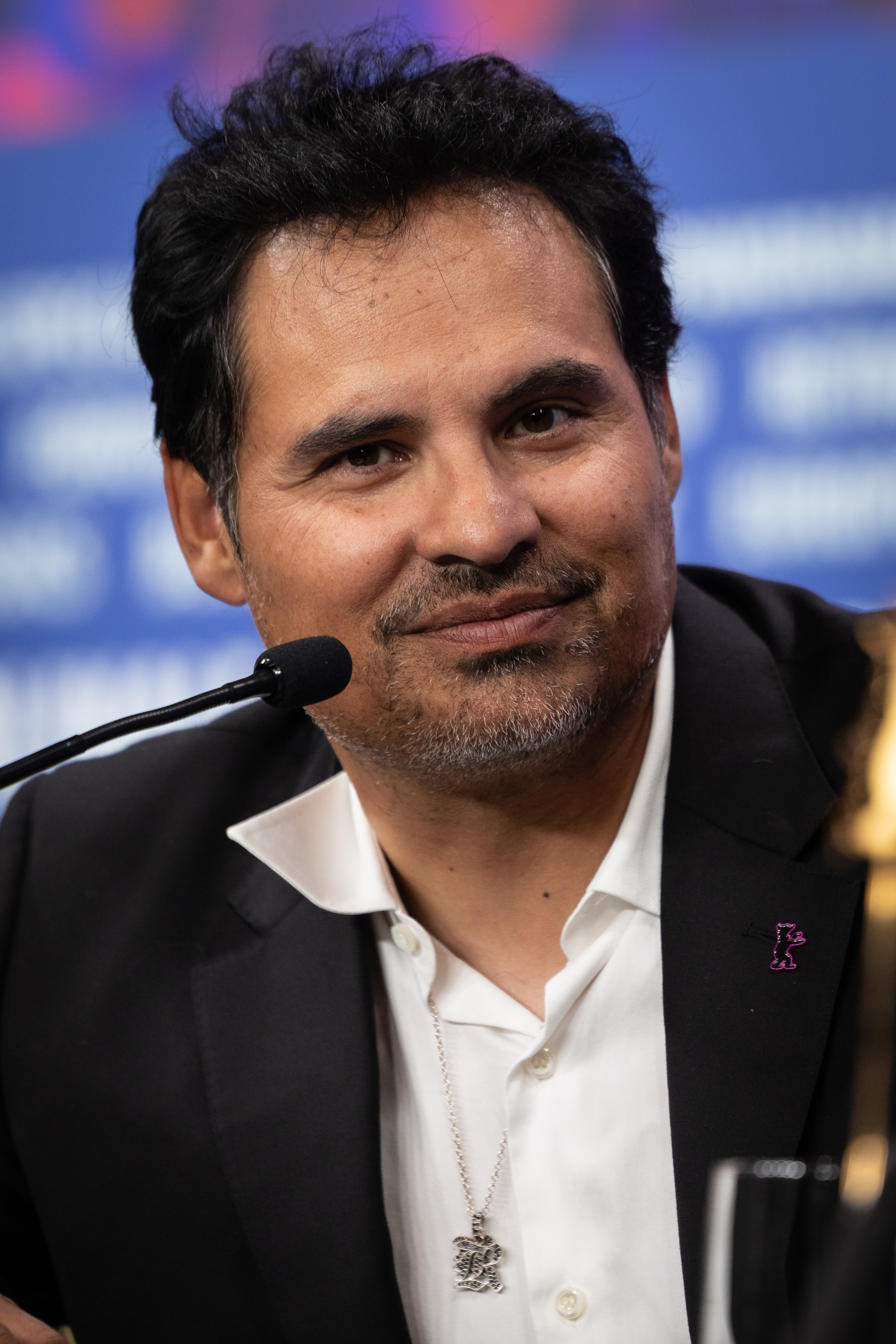
- Peña in 2026
- Born: January 13, 1976 (age 50); Chicago, Illinois, U.S.
- Occupation: Actor
- Years active: 1996–present
- Spouse: Brie Shaffer (m. 2006)
- Children: 1

Michael Peña (/ˈpeɪnjə/ PAYN-yə; Spanish: [ˈpeɲa]; born January 13, 1976) is an American actor. He has starred in many films, including Crash (2004), World Trade Center (2006), Shooter (2007), Observe and Report (2009), Tower Heist (2011), Battle: Los Angeles (2011), End of Watch (2012), and Gangster Squad (2013). He has also acted in films such as American Hustle (2013), The Martian (2015), Ant-Man (2015) and its sequel Ant-Man and the Wasp (2018), and Extinction (2018). Peña had the title role in Cesar Chavez (2014), played DEA agent Kiki Camarena in season one of the Netflix series Narcos: Mexico (2018), and CIA agent Domingo Chavez in season 4 of the Prime Video series Jack Ryan (2023). He also starred in A Million Miles Away (2023).

He was nominated for the Independent Spirit Award for Best Supporting Male for his performance in End of Watch.

== Early life ==
Peña was born on January 13, 1976, in Chicago, Illinois, the son of Nicolasa, a social worker, and Eleuterio Peña, a factory worker. Peña stated in an interview with Mario Lopez that both his parents attained green cards after he was born and after crossing the border multiple times. Peña's parents were originally farmers, and emigrated from Mexico; his father was from Villa Purificación, Jalisco, and his mother was from Charcas, San Luis Potosí. He grew up in the North Lawndale area of Chicago, attended Marist High School, and graduated from Hubbard High School where he participated and was a state qualifier in wrestling and track.

== Career ==
=== Film ===
Though Peña has been a regular in independent productions since 1996, his breakthrough performances came in two Best Picture Oscar-winning Paul Haggis-penned films, Million Dollar Baby (2004) and Crash (2004). The former was directed by Clint Eastwood, and the latter was directed by Haggis. Though both films are critically acclaimed, Peña received attention for his particularly emotional performance in Crash. The following year, he appeared on the Golden Globe-winning series The Shield. He starred in Oliver Stone's film based on the September 11, 2001 attacks, World Trade Center. He also had a small role in Alejandro González Iñárritu's film Babel. This gives him the rare distinction of having appeared in three consecutive films nominated for the Best Picture Oscar.

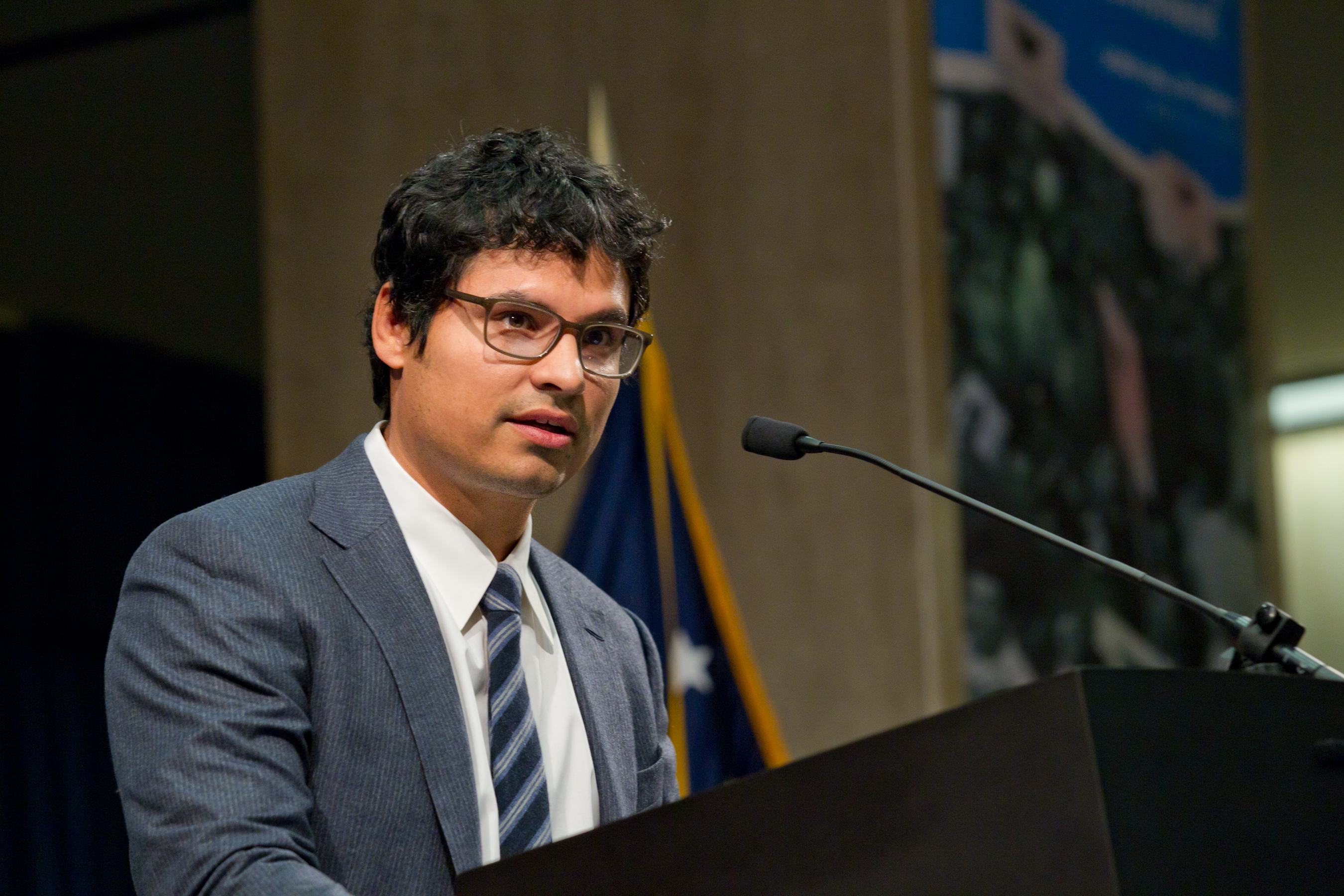
Peña as the Master of Ceremonies for the Cesar E. Chavez Memorial in 2012

In 1999, Peña starred as Oscar in Bellyfruit, an independent film about teen-pregnancy co-written and directed by Kerri Green. In 2006, Peña starred in the HBO film Walkout as Sal Castro, a Mexican-American high school teacher who inspires a group of East L.A. high school students to fight for Chicano rights.

He starred alongside Mark Wahlberg in Shooter (2007) as novice FBI agent Nick Memphis. In 2009, he played a mall security guard alongside Seth Rogen in Jody Hill's Observe and Report.

In 2012, he co-starred with Jake Gyllenhaal as a Los Angeles police officer, in End of Watch. The same year, he began filming César Chávez, a biopic about the life of American labor leader César Chávez, who founded the United Farm Workers. Peña stars as Chávez. He appeared alongside Brad Pitt, Shia LaBeouf, Logan Lerman, and Jon Bernthal in the World War II-set action film Fury (2014), and portrayed Luis in Ant-Man (2015).

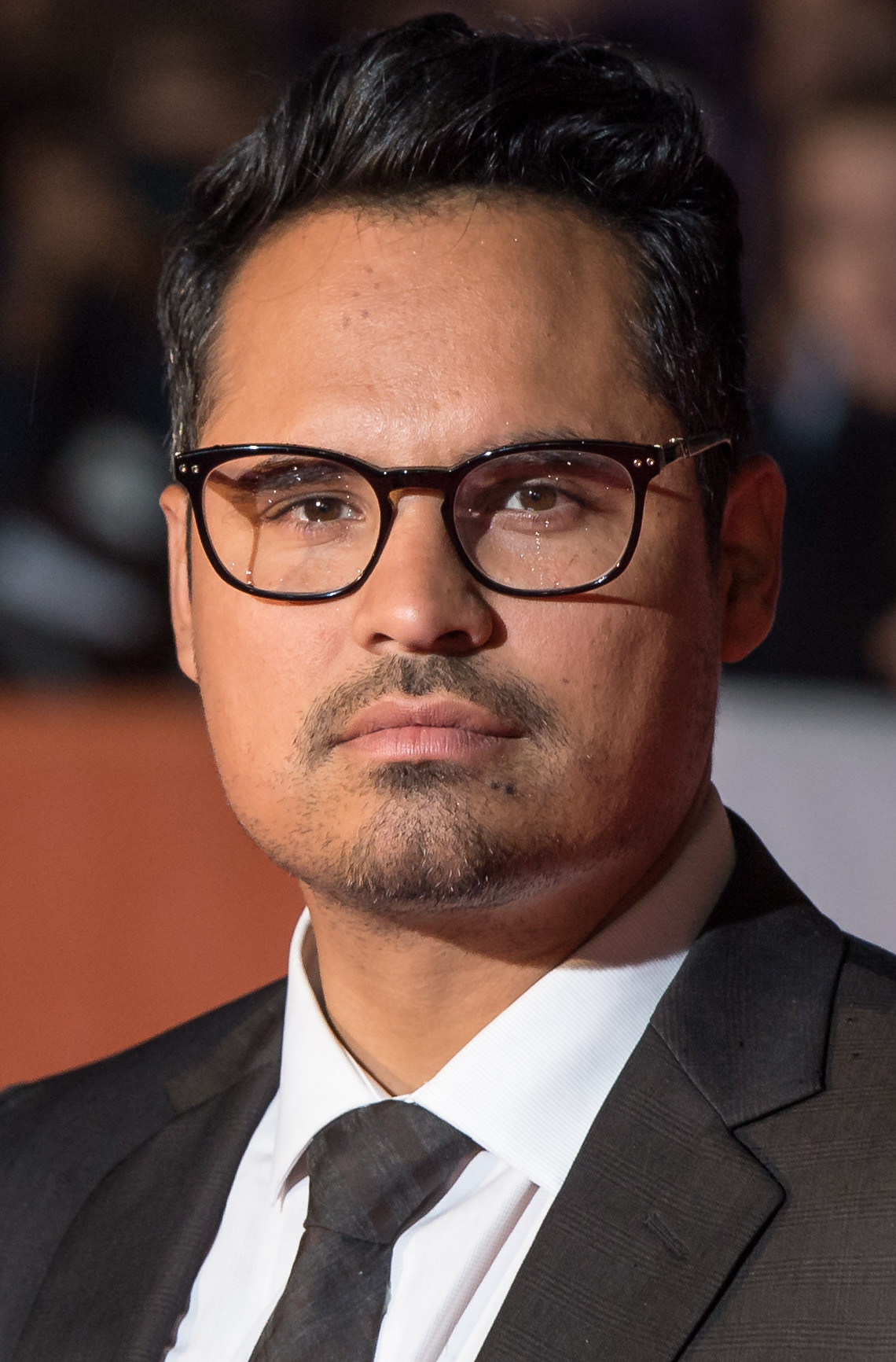
Peña at the premiere of The Martian at the 2015 Toronto International Film Festival

In 2015, Peña was a principal player of the ensemble cast for his role on board the Ares-III space-craft to Mars, in the award-winning Ridley Scott sci-film The Martian. Peña starred in 12 Strong alongside Chris Hemsworth. He also starred in the 2018 remake of A Wrinkle in Time, where he played the main antagonist, The IT, in his human form (known as "Red"). In 2020, Peña took a turn as the mysterious and enigmatic Mr. Roarke in the critically panned prequel Fantasy Island.

=== Television ===
In December 2017, it was reported that Peña had joined the cast of Narcos for its upcoming fourth season. It was later revealed that the fourth season would be a new series, Narcos: Mexico, with Peña starring as DEA agent Kiki Camarena.

=== Voice acting ===
Peña voiced the character Ricky in the FX animated comedy Chozen. In Turbo, he voiced Tito. He also provided vocals for the character Marguerite (in the episode "Hot Water") for the popular animated series American Dad!.

=== Music ===
In 2005, Peña formed the Los Angeles rock band Nico Vega, named after his mother, Nicolasa. He left the band in 2007 to concentrate on his acting career, but co-wrote the track "Beast", which reached No. 26 on the Billboard Hot Rock Songs Chart. Peña starred in a video created for Midlake's track "Bethel Woods", which premiered January 12, 2022. He returned with Nico Vega in December 2023.

== Personal life ==
Peña has been a member of Scientology since 2000.

In 2006, he married Brie Shaffer. They have one son, born in 2008.

== Filmography ==
=== Film ===
Year	Title	Role	Notes
1996	My Fellow Americans	Ernesto	
1997	Star Maps	Star Map Boy	
1998	Boogie Boy	Drug Dealer	
1998	La Cucaracha	Orderly	
1999	Bellyfruit	Oscar	
2000	Gone in 60 Seconds	Ignacio	Credited as Michael A. Peña
2001	Buffalo Soldiers	Garcia	
2003	The United States of Leland	Guillermo	
2003	Love Object	Ramirez	
2004	The Calcium Kid	Jose Mendez	
2004	Crash	Daniel	ALMA Award for Outstanding Actor in a Motion Picture; Nominated – Gotham Independent Film Award for Best Ensemble Cast
2004	Million Dollar Baby	Omar	
2005	Little Athens	Carlos	
2005	Sueño	Jimmy	
2006	Fifty Pills	Eduardo	
2006	Babel	John - Border Patrol	
2006	World Trade Center	Will Jimeno	Nominated – ALMA Award for Outstanding Actor - Motion Picture
2007	Shooter	Nick Memphis	
2007	Lions for Lambs	Ernest	
2008	The Lucky Ones	T.K. Poole	
2009	Observe and Report	Dennis	
2009	My Son, My Son, What Have Ye Done?	Detective Vargas	
2010	Everything Must Go	Frank Garcia	
2011	Battle: Los Angeles	Joe Rincon	Nominated – ALMA Award for Favorite Movie Actor
2011	The Lincoln Lawyer	Jesus Martinez	
2011	The Good Doctor	Jimmy	
2011	30 Minutes or Less	Chango	
2011	Tower Heist	Enrique Dev'reaux	
2012	End of Watch	Officer Zavala	Nominated – Independent Spirit Award for Best Supporting Male; Nominated – MTV Movie Award for Best Latino Actor
2013	Gangster Squad	Navidad Ramirez	
2013	Turbo	Tito Lopez (voice)	
2013	American Hustle	Paco Hernandez/Sheik Abdullah	New York Film Critics Online Award for Best Ensemble; Critics' Choice Movie Award for Best Acting Ensemble; Screen Actors Guild Award for Outstanding Performance by a Cast in a Motion Picture; Central Ohio Film Critics Association Award for Best Ensemble
2014	Cesar Chavez	César Chávez	ALMA Award for Special Achievement in Film; Imagen Award for Best Actor in Feature Film
2014	Frontera	Miguel	
2014	Fury	Trini 'Gordo' Garcia	
2015	Ant-Man	Luis	
2015	The Vatican Tapes	Father Lozano	
2015	Vacation	New Mexico Cop	
2015	The Martian	Major Rick Martinez	
2015	Hell and Back	Abigor (voice)	
2016	War on Everyone	Bob Bolano	
2016	Collateral Beauty	Simon Stone	
2017	CHiPs	Frank "Ponch" Poncherello / FBI Agent Castillo	Also executive producer
2017	The Lego Ninjago Movie	Kai (voice)	
2017	My Little Pony: The Movie	Grubber (voice)	
2017	Zane's Stand Up Promo	Kai (voice)	Short film
2018	12 Strong	Sergeant First Class Sam Diller	
2018	A Wrinkle in Time	Red	
2018	Ant-Man and the Wasp	Luis	
2018	Extinction	Peter	
2018	Next Gen	Momo (voice)	
2018	The Mule	Trevino	
2019	Dora and the Lost City of Gold	Cole Marquez	
2019	Jexi	Kai	
2020	Fantasy Island	Mr. Julian Roarke	
2021	Tom & Jerry	Terence Mendoza	
2022	Moonfall	Tom Lopez	
2022	Secret Headquarters	Ansel Argon	
2023	A Million Miles Away	José M. Hernández	
2024	Unstoppable	Bobby Williams	
2025	A Working Man	Joe Garcia	
2025	Good Luck, Have Fun, Don't Die	Mark	
TBA	Judgment Day †	TBA	Post-production
TBA	Subversion †	TBA	Post-production
TBA	Tumor †	TBA	Post-production

=== Television ===
Year	Title	Role	Notes
1996	Pacific Blue	Rabbit	Episode: "Bangers"
1997	Touched by an Angel	Reynaldo Estes	Episode: "At Risk"
1998	Homicide: Life on the Street	Luis Carrenza	2 episodes Credited as Michael Anthony Pena
1998	The Sentinel	Johnny	Episode: "Night Shift"; Credited as Michael A. Pena
1998	7th Heaven	Roger	Episode: "Let's Talk About Sex"; Credited as Michael A. Pena
1999	Tracey Takes On...	Busboy	Episode: "Scandal"
1999	Moesha	Alejandro	Episode: "Life Imitating Art"
1999	Profiler	Alex Lopez	Episode: "Spree of Love"; Credited as Michael Anthony Peña
1999–2000	Felicity	Brian Burke	5 episodes
2000	The District	Sante	Episode: "The Real Terrorist"
2001	Roswell	Fly	2 episodes
2001	Men, Women & Dogs	Miguel	2 episodes
2002	American Family		2 episodes
2002	Andy Richter Controls the Universe	Patrick	Episode: "Wedding"
2003	The Twilight Zone	Noah	Episode: "Sunrise"; Credited as Michael A. Peña
2003	ER	Police Officer	3 episodes
1997, 2004	NYPD Blue	Ferd; Wilmer Lopez	2 episodes
2005	CSI: Crime Scene Investigation	Juanito Concha	Episode: "Snakes"
2005	The Shield	Detective Armando Renta	10 episodes
2006	Walkout	Sal Castro	Television film Black Reel Award for Network/Cable - Best Supporting Actor; Imagen Award for Best Actor - Television; Nominated – ALMA Award for Outstanding Actor - Television Series, Mini-Series or Television Movie
2008	My Name Is Earl	Circus	Episode: "No Heads and a Duffle Bag"
2010	Eastbound & Down	Sebastián Cisneros	5 episodes
2011, 2013	American Dad!	Marguerite (voice)	2 episodes
2014	Chozen	Ricky (voice)	10 episodes
2014	Gracepoint	Mark Solano	10 episodes
2018	Narcos: Mexico	Kiki Camarena	Main cast; 10 episodes (Season 1)
2023	Jack Ryan	Domingo "Ding" Chavez	Main cast (Season 4)
2024	Landman	Armando Medina	Episode: "Landman"
2025	All Her Fault	Detective Jim Alcaras	Main Cast

=== Video games ===
Year	Title	Role	Notes
2016	Lego Marvel's Avengers	Luis	Ant-Man downloadable pack
