= José M. Hernández =

American astronaut and engineer (born 1962)

José Hernández
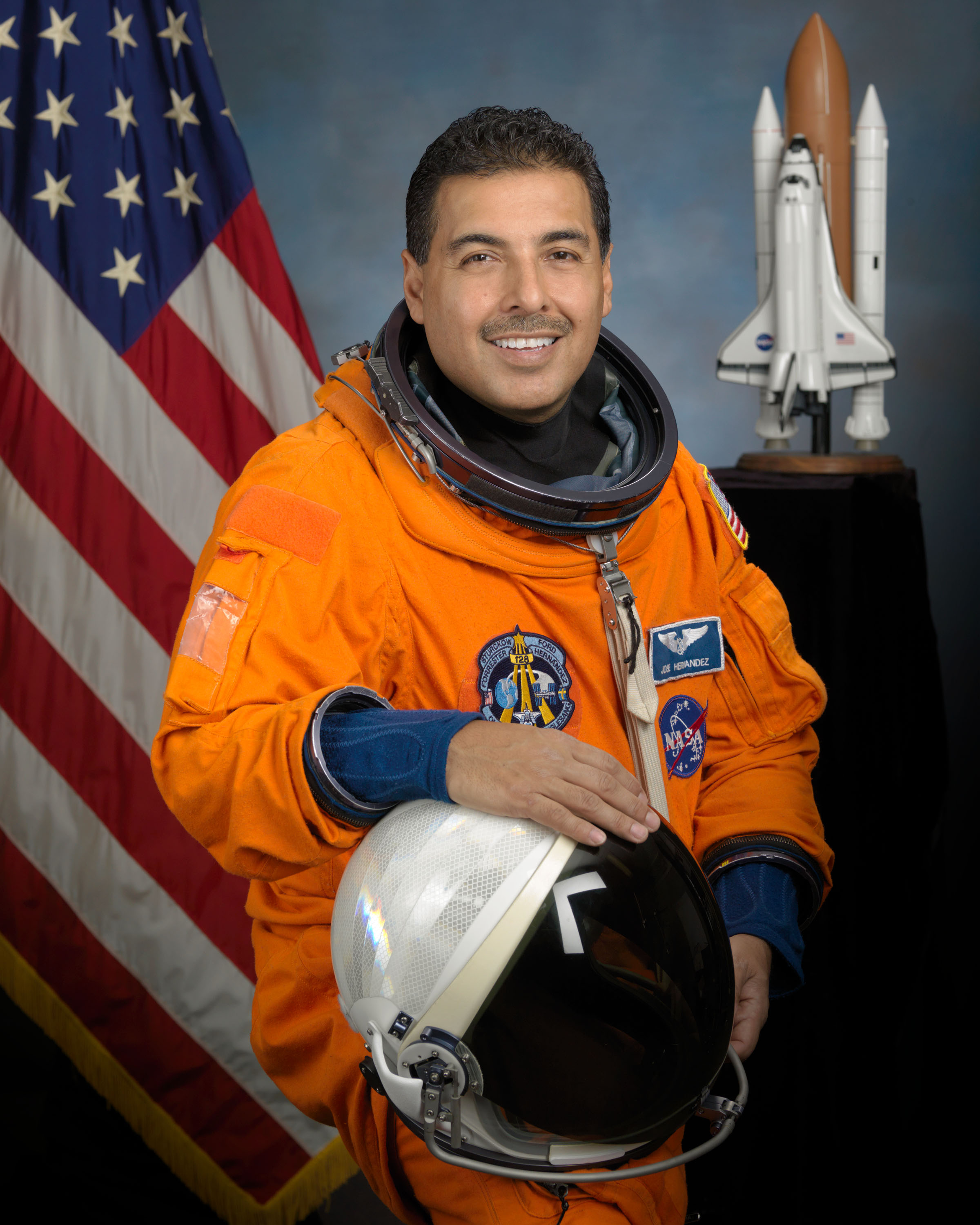
- Official portrait, 2009
- Born: José Moreno Hernández; August 7, 1962 (age 64); French Camp, California, U.S.
- Education: University of the Pacific (BS); University of California, Santa Barbara (MS)
- Space career

NASA astronaut
- Time in space: 13d 20h 54m
- Selection: NASA Group 19 (2004)
- Mission: STS-128
- Retired: January 14, 2011

José Moreno Hernández (born August 7, 1962) is a Mexican-American engineer and astronaut. He serves as a Regent of the University of California until 2033.

Hernández was on the Space Shuttle mission STS-128 in August 2009. He also served as chief of the Materials and Processes branch of Johnson Space Center. Hernández previously developed equipment for full-field digital mammography at Lawrence Livermore National Laboratory.

In October 2011, Hernández, at the urging of President Barack Obama, ran for Congress as a Democrat in California's newly redrawn 10th congressional district in the U.S. House of Representatives. He won the Democratic nomination but lost the 2012 general election to freshman Representative Jeff Denham.

Hernández is the subject of the 2023 biopic A Million Miles Away in which he is portrayed by Michael Peña.

== Early life and education ==
Hernández was born in French Camp, California, but calls Stockton, California, his hometown. His family is originally from La Piedad, Michoacán, Mexico. In an August 25, 2009 conversation with the President Felipe Calderón of Mexico, Hernández stated that as a child, he lived half the year in La Piedad and half in the United States. As a child, Hernández worked alongside his family and other farmworkers throughout the fields of California, harvesting crops and moving from one town to another. He attended many schools and didn't learn to speak English until he was 12. His first memory of space is about adjusting the television to watch the Apollo 17 mission in 1972.

José Hernández participated in Upward Bound during high school, a Federal TRIO program that prepares students for college. He graduated from Franklin High School in Stockton. José Hernández was a first-generation college student who graduated with a bachelor's and master's degree. He earned a Bachelor of Science degree in electrical engineering from the University of the Pacific in December 1984 and "walked" in May of 1985. In 1986, Hernández earned a Master of Science degree in electrical and computer engineering from the University of California, Santa Barbara. While in college, he was involved in the Mathematics, Engineering, Science Achievement (MESA) program, an academic preparation program that provides support to students from educationally disadvantaged backgrounds so they can attain four-year degrees in science, technology, engineering or math (STEM) fields.

== Engineering career ==
Hernández worked from 1990 to 2001 at Lawrence Livermore National Laboratory in Livermore, California. While there, Hernández, along with a commercial colleague, developed the first full-field digital mammography imaging system. This invention aids in the early detection of breast cancer.During his time there he also was awarded Lawrence Livermore National Laboratory "Outstanding Engineer Award."

== NASA career ==
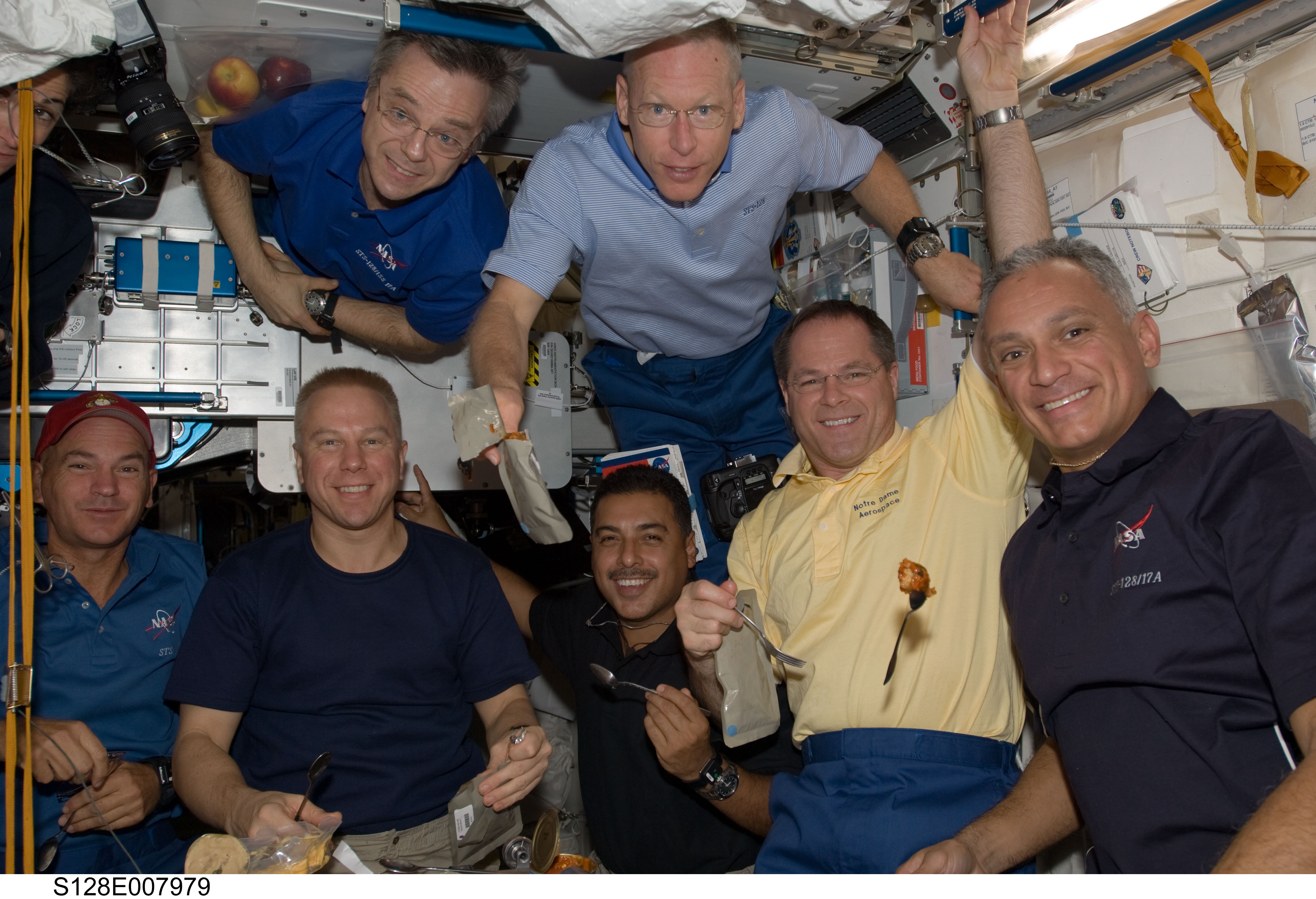
Hernández (center, bottom) inside Node 1 of the ISS during STS-128

In 2001, Hernández joined the Johnson Space Center, in Houston, Texas.

After three years and being turned down eleven times for astronaut training by NASA, Hernández was selected in May 2004. In February 2006 he completed Astronaut Candidate Training that included scientific and technical briefings, intensive instruction in Shuttle and International Space Station systems, physiological training, T-38 flight training, and water and wilderness survival training. On completing this initial training, Hernández was assigned to the Shuttle Branch to support Kennedy Space Center Operations in support of shuttle launch and landing preparations.

In May 2007, Hernández served as an aquanaut during the NEEMO 12 mission aboard the Aquarius underwater laboratory, living and working underwater for eleven days.

Hernández worked various technical assignments until his selection on July 15, 2008, as a mission specialist-flight engineer on the STS-128 mission, which launched on August 28, 2009. While in orbit, Hernández became the first person to use the Spanish language in space while tweeting.

The STS-128 mission ended its 13-day journey on September 11, 2009, at Edwards Air Force Base, California, at 5:53 pm PDT.

== Political career ==
During the summer of 2009, Hernández told the Stockton Record that he would consider not running against fellow Democrat Dennis Cardoza in his Stockton-based district.

Hernández announced at Pacific Union College on September 29, 2011, that at the urging of President Barack Obama he was considering a run for the U.S. House of Representatives and would announce his decision on October 11, 2011. He announced his candidacy as promised on October 11 via Twitter by linking to his campaign website. Hernández made his first public campaign appearance on January 14, 2012, at a Democratic Candidate Forum in Tracy at the Holiday Inn Express & Suites.

In March 2012, Bell, McAndrews & Hiltachk, a law firm with links to the California Republican Party, sued in Sacramento County Superior Court to block Hernández from describing himself as an "astronaut/scientist/engineer" on the June ballot. The lawsuit stated that "astronaut is not a title one carries for life"; the election code requires the description to be accurate for the previous calendar year. "Allowing a candidate to use the profession of 'astronaut' when he hasn't served in that profession recently is akin to allowing someone to use the title of 'sailor' when they no longer own or operate a ship," said Jennifer Kerns, a California Republican Party spokeswoman. On March 29, a Sacramento County Superior Court judge ruled that Hernández could be described as an astronaut on the June 5 primary ballot.

On the campaign trail, Hernández was criticized for having a 2010 personal tax lien imposed by the IRS and paid in 2012. Hernández attacked his opponent, Denham, for his tax liens imposed against his business in 2003 and paid in 2003.

=== Endorsements ===
Hernández received the endorsement of Democracy for America and was selected as one of the Dean Dozen supported in 2012. In June 2012, he received an endorsement from the California Labor Federation, an AFL-CIO affiliate. On November 6th 2012, Hernández lost to the incumbent, Congressman Jeff Denham, in the General Election for California's new 10th District. Hernández finished in the polls with 46 percent of the vote.

=== Fundraising ===
Most of Hernández's campaign funds came from outside his district and many donations came from left-wing political action committees and public employee unions. Speaking of his fundraising Hernández said, "there aren't any special interest groups that are going to come back and say I have to vote for something. I don't believe they're going to influence me in making decisions on what's best for my district." Hernández said he does not think organizations like teachers' unions are special interest groups.

=== Speculation ===
Since his 2012 loss, Hernández has made multiple public statements regarding potential future campaigns. In March 2016, Hernández said, "I ran for Congress in 2012 but I lost in a close race. Now I'm thinking about making a comeback, maybe in 2018."

Hernández filed papers to challenge incumbent Democratic Representative Josh Harder in the 9th district in 2022, but ultimately did not run.

=== Political views ===
==== Immigration ====
Hernández made headlines soon after his return to Earth as a result of comments he made on Mexican television advocating that the United States legalize undocumented immigrants. He does not favor a guest worker program or a secure ID program.

==== Fiscal policy ====
Hernández supported California's Proposition 30, a ballot measure proposed by Gov. Jerry Brown to increase income taxes on those earning more than $250,000 and raise the sales tax rate by a quarter-cent for everyone. Hernández says there needs to be a combination of tax increases and budget cuts to balance the federal budget.

== Personal life ==
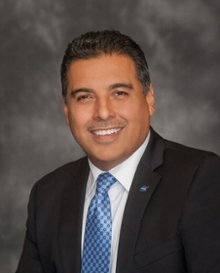
Hernández c. 2021

Hernández and his wife Adela have five children. For several years, his wife ran a Mexican restaurant just outside the Johnson Space Center gates, called Tierra Luna Grill, which is Spanish for Lunar Surface Grill. Hernández owns a 20-acre vineyard near Lodi, California, and in 2021 began bottling wine under the Tierra Luna Cellars label.

In 2023, a film entitled A Million Miles Away about Hernández's NASA career, starring Michael Peña, was released. The film was based on Hernández's 2012 autobiography, "Reaching for the Stars: The Inspiring Story of a Migrant Farmworker Turned Astronaut."

== Awards and honors ==
Hernández has earned or been awarded:

- Graduate Engineering Minority Fellow (GEM) (1985)
- Hispanic Engineer National Achievement Award, "Outstanding Technical Contribution" (1995)
- Society of Mexican American Engineers and Scientists (MAES) "Medalla de Oro" recipient for professional and community contributions (1999)
- U.S. Department of Energy "Outstanding Performance Commendation" (2000)
- NASA Service Awards (2002, 2003)
- Lawrence Livermore National Laboratory "Outstanding Engineer Award" (2001)
- Upward Bound National TRIO Achiever Award (2001)
- Eta Kappa Nu Electrical Engineering Honor Society member and awarded an honorary LL.D. degree from the University of California at Santa Barbara (2006)
- José Hernández Middle School, in San Jose, California, is named after him
- University of California, Santa Barbara 2015 Distinguished Alumnus
- United States Hispanic Leadership Institute, 2016 National Hispanic Hero Award
- University of the Pacific 2019 Medallion of Excellence for outstanding and exceptional service to the University of the Pacific, their profession, and community.

== Filmography ==
Television roles
Year	Title	Role	Notes
2022	The Casagrandes	Himself (voice)	Episode: "Rocket Plan"
2023	A Million Miles Away	Cameo role as a Closeout Crew Member	

== See also ==
- List of Hispanic astronauts
- List of astronauts educated at the University of California
