= A Million Miles Away (film) =

2023 film by Alejandra Marquez Abella

- Official release poster
- Directed by: Alejandra Marquez Abella
- Screenplay by: Bettina Gilois; Hernán Jiménez; Alejandra Marquez Abella
- Based on: Reaching for the Stars by José M. Hernández
- Produced by: Mark Ciardi; Campbell McInnes
- Starring: Michael Peña; Garret Dillahunt
- Cinematography: Dariela Ludlow
- Edited by: Hervé Schneid
- Music by: Camilo Lara
- Production companies: Amazon MGM Studios; Select Films
- Distributed by: Amazon Prime Video
- Release date: September 15, 2023
- Running time: 121 minutes
- Country: United States
- Language: English

A Million Miles Away is a 2023 American biographical drama film detailing the life of José M. Hernández, a Mexican-American astronaut, who is played by Michael Peña. It was directed by Alejandra Marquez Abella from a screenplay written by Bettina Gilois and re-written by Hernán Jiménez and Abella, based on Hernandez's autobiography Reaching for the Stars.

The film was released on Amazon Prime Video on September 15, 2023.

== Plot ==
In the late 1960s and 70s, José is a young boy whose family travels from Michoacán as migrant workers picking grapes in California, his parents hoping to buy a house back home after they've made enough money. While they are working in the harvest season, José attends school and works in the fields with his family after. His teacher, Ms. Young, notices his potential and visits his parents at home to express her concern over the disruption to his studies by going back and forth as migrant workers. After his father is only paid partial wages for his work, he realizes José's teacher was right to be concerned and the family decides to stay in California full time.

Years later, José graduates from the University of the Pacific and is hired as an engineer at the Lawrence Livermore National Laboratory. Feeling as if he needs to fit in better, he trades in his customized 1963 Chevrolet Impala for a used Mazda RX-7. While signing the paperwork, he meets Adela, whom he asks out. After an intimidating first meeting with her family, they see each other more until they marry. They have five kids and José continues to work successfully at the lab, now instructing the researchers who had previously ignored him.

One day during class, José's boss offers him a chance to join a team going to Russia to evaluate a shipment of enriched uranium the United States is looking to purchase for NASA, noting that a trip like that would look really good on an application to the NASA space program. After several rejections, José hand delivers his 12th application in person to Frederick Sturckow who trains incoming astronauts and is a veteran of the Space Shuttle program. He makes a positive impression on Sturckow and is accepted into the program shortly thereafter.

José struggles with the training, falling further behind the rest of his class. When he learns of the death of Beto (a cousin and close friend of his), he loses focus and is exhorted by Sturckow to catch up with the rest or he may be dismissed from the program. He later has a conversation with the head trainer, Kalpana Chawla, who describes to him why going to space makes all of their hard work worthwhile, and ends by letting him know she's been selected as the Mission Specialist for STS-107 on Space Shuttle Columbia.

As José sits with his family watching the broadcast of Columbia's return, they are shaken when news comes of Columbia's disintegration on re-entry. Nevertheless, José continues on and begins excelling among his classmates at NASA.

In 2008, Sturckow pulls José into a conference room to meet with the selection team, who informs him that he's been chosen to join STS-128 as their Mission Specialist. José visits Adela's restaurant outside the NASA grounds and tells her the news, with his family later watching him at the press conference. He quotes Beto's words to him that it's fitting for a migrant farmworker to go into the unknowns of space. As he enters quarantine in preparation for the mission, Adela visits him with a surprise: his former teacher Ms. Young, who tells him she's been waiting for this moment for over 30 years, having followed his progress and career, always believing in his enormous potential.

The launch day finally arrives, José is prepared along with the rest of the crew who board the shuttle, and launch into orbit. After main engine cutoff, José looks around at the shuttle cabin and imagines seeing the same monarch butterfly that landed on his dad's arm the day their family decided to stay in California, hinting that he had achieved his destiny.

Closing titles note that Mission STS-128 remained on board the International Space Station for 13 days, and that José had tacos and listened to José Alfredo Jiménez's “El Hijo del Pueblo” while there. José was the first migrant farmworker in space, and still picks grapes with his father today, albeit in his own vineyard: Tierra Luna Cellars in Lodi, California.

== Cast ==
- Michael Peña as José M. Hernández
- Garret Dillahunt as Frederick W. Sturckow
- Rosa Salazar as Adela Hernández
- Bobby Soto as Beto
- Julio Cesar Cedillo as Salvador Hernández
- Verónica Falcón as Julia
- Sarayu Blue as Kalpana Chawla
- Eric Johnson as Clint Logan
- Jordan Dean as Weissberg
- Ashley Ciarra as Marisa
- Michelle Krusiec as Miss Young
- Carlos S. Sanchez as Julio (Age 11)
  - Isaac Arellanes as Julio (Age 16)
- Emma Fassler as Stacey
- Isabel Aerenlund as Nicole Stott
- Michael Adler as Anderson
- José M. Hernández as Closeout Crew Member of the Discovery

== Production ==
In July 2022, Amazon Studios acquired the distribution rights to the film, which was previously in development at Netflix. The studio would later switch it to a Metro-Goldwyn-Mayer release following the formation of Amazon MGM Studios Distribution in 2023. Filming took place in Mexico City.

== Reception ==
On the review aggregator website Rotten Tomatoes, 89% of 54 critics' reviews are positive, with an average rating of 7/10. The website's critics consensus reads: "Thanks in part to a pair of appealing lead performances, A Million Miles Away is one inspirational biopic that mostly avoids heavy-handed gimmicks." Metacritic, which uses a weighted average, assigned the film a score of 62 out of 100, based on 10 critics, indicating "generally favorable" reviews.

The New York Times wrote that the film was "[b]eautifully shot and interspersed with historical footage of migrant workers and spacecraft launches", stating that its "most effective and touching scenes revolve around the family relationships", while also noting that "the grit narrative at times becomes a bit heavy-handed".

== Accolades ==
The film was the recipient of the 2024 Movieguide Awards' Faith & Freedom Award for Television.
