= Shafter High School =

Location
- 526 Mannel Ave; Shafter, California 93263; United States; 35.507556°N 119.269293°W

Information
- School type: Comprehensive Public High School
- Status: Operating
- School district: Kern High School District
- Superintendent: Donald Carter
- CEEB code: 053360
- NCES School ID: 061954002352
- Principal: Russell Shipley
- Teaching staff: 73.96 (FTE)
- Grades: 9–12
- Gender: Coeducational
- Enrollment: 1,655 (2023-2024)
- Student to teacher ratio: 22.38
- Campus type: Suburban
- Colors: Navy & Gold
- Mascot: Generals
- Rival: Wasco High School, Arvin High School, Taft Union High School
- Website: School web site

Shafter High School is a public high school in Shafter, California, United States, a city north of Bakersfield, California.

== Academics ==
As of 2013, Shafter High School operates on a 7:58 a.m. to 3:05 p.m. schedule. This includes seven periods of instruction and a lunch.

=== Enrollment ===
In the 2011–12 school year, Shafter High School had an enrollment of 1,494 students. Shafter High School is integrated in the school years of 2011–2012 with, 0.3% American Indian/Alaska Native, 0.7% Asian, 0.1% Native Hawaiian/Pacific Islander, 0.2% Filipino, 89% Hispanic, 0.9% Black, and 8.1% White.

== Athletics ==
Currently, the school offers 9 sports teams for students. These sports include baseball/softball, basketball, golf, football, wrestling, volleyball, track and field, soccer, and tennis.

== Notable alumni ==
- Anna Jelmini – track and field athlete.
- Dean Florez – former California State Senator from the 16th Senate District.
- Dick Witcher National Football League San Francisco 49ers
