= Jim White (cross-country) =

American track and field coach

- Born: May 14, 1941 (age 85); Sweetwater, Texas
- Spouse: Cheryl White
- Children: Julie White, Jami White, Tami White

Jim White (born May 14, 1941, in Sweetwater, Texas) is an American track and field coach, a former high school cross country coach at McFarland High School. From 1987 to 2003, his teams won nine state championships in Divisions III and IV, as well as numerous lesser titles.

== Personal life ==
Jim White is married to Cheryl White and has three daughters: Julie, Jami, and Tami. He started teaching in the McFarland school district after graduating from Pepperdine University in 1964. White taught different subjects at numerous grade levels (fifth-grade science, seventh and eighth-grade wood shop and PE) before starting his coaching career in 1980. During his time as a cross country coach for McFarland, Jim White would follow his team on a bike as his team ran or occasionally ran with them. Although White retired from coaching in 2003, he still visits and participates in practices.

== In popular culture ==
=== Movies ===
In 2015, Walt Disney Pictures released the film McFarland, USA about White and his program, White being portrayed by Kevin Costner.
