= Al otro lado (2005 film) =

- Directed by: Natalia Almada
- Countries of origin: Mexico; United States
- Original language: English

Production
- Producer: Natalia Almada
- Cinematography: Chuy Chavez
- Editor: Natalia Almada
- Running time: 90 minutes

Original release
- Release: 2005

Al otro lado is a 2005 documentary film about illegal immigration and drug trafficking between Mexico and the United States, addressing issues facing people north and south of the border, though the film mostly focuses on Magdiel, a 23-year-old fisherman and aspiring composer who dreams of a better life in the United States.

Al otro lado was produced and directed by Natalia Almada and was aired as part of PBS's POV series in 2006. It was met with critical acclaim and received a 78% rating on Rotten Tomatoes. It also received the Special Jury Prize and the Best Editing Award at the Cine Ceará Film Festival and was nominated for the Gotham Award for Best Film Not Playing in a Theater Near You.
