= McFarland, USA =

- Theatrical release poster
- Directed by: Niki Caro
- Screenplay by: Christopher Cleveland; Bettina Gilois; Grant Thompson
- Story by: Christopher Cleveland; Bettina Gilois
- Produced by: Gordon Gray; Mark Ciardi
- Starring: Kevin Costner; Maria Bello; Morgan Saylor
- Cinematography: Adam Arkapaw
- Edited by: David Coulson
- Music by: Antônio Pinto
- Production companies: Walt Disney Pictures; Mayhem Pictures
- Distributed by: Walt Disney Studios; Motion Pictures
- Release dates: February 9, 2015 (Hollywood); February 20, 2015 (United States)
- Running time: 129 minutes
- Country: United States
- Language: English
- Budget: $17 million
- Box office: $45.7 million

McFarland, USA (also known as McFarland) is a 2015 American sports drama film directed by Niki Caro, produced by Mark Ciardi and Gordon Gray, written by Christopher Cleveland, Bettina Gilois and Grant Thompson with music composed by Antônio Pinto. The film was co-produced by Walt Disney Pictures and Mayhem Pictures. Based on the true story of a 1987 cross country team from a mainly Latino high school in McFarland, California, the film stars Kevin Costner as Jim White, the school's coach, who leads the team to win a state championship. The film also stars Maria Bello and Morgan Saylor.

McFarland, USA was released on February 20, 2015, received positive reviews from critics, and grossed over $45 million. The film was released on DVD and Blu-ray on June 2, 2015, by Walt Disney Studios Home Entertainment.

== Plot ==
In 1987, high school football coach Jim White loses his temper and accidentally injures a player in the locker room. As a result, White is fired and has to relocate his family from Boise, Idaho to his new job at McFarland High School in McFarland, California, which is predominantly Latino. They have trouble adjusting to the Hispanic neighborhood and lament being unable to afford to live in Bakersfield.

White is first put as assistant football coach but ultimately loses his coaching status after pulling an injured player, Johnny Sameniego, out of a game, causing the crass head coach Jenks to ask White to step down.

After discovering that some of his students are strong runners, White has Principal Camillo authorize cross-country as a sport and organizes an all-boys team. White enlists Sameniego's help and recruits Thomas Valles, Jose Cardenas, Victor Puentes, and brothers David, Damacio, and Danny Diaz. All seven have little hope for their future, specifically Valles, who has hardships with his father and nearly jumps off a bridge before White stops him. Jim's devotion to the team leads to him alienating his family, including forgetting to pick up his daughter Julie's birthday cake.

After a few regional competitions, the team wins their first race. Shortly afterward, the Diaz brothers are taken off the team by their father, who wants them to work for his team of field pickers instead. In response, White joins them in the fields one Saturday and convinces them to come to meets and races at earlier and later times of the day, to which the Diaz brothers finally address him as "coach". White's wife, Cheryl, organizes a tamale and car wash sale with the rest of the neighborhood to raise money for new uniforms, where the Whites become better acquainted with the community.

Eventually, the McFarland team competes in and qualifies for the State Tournament, and White takes them to the beach to celebrate. White also makes amends with Julie by throwing her a quinceañera with help from the community, though it goes wrong when Julie is taken out on a "parade" around the town and the group of cars is attacked by another group of street punks.

Despite the group's insistence that Julie was protected, Jim questions his family's safety in McFarland and interviews for a full-time position at Palo Alto that he was previously offered, upsetting Julie and Thomas. Cheryl implores him to continue to be there for the McFarland team and their friends in the neighborhood, reminding him how much the community has embraced them.

The day of the state championships comes and the whole McFarland community accompanies the team to the race. Because of White's rigorous training and the team's efforts, McFarland upsets the other more favored schools and comes in first. After the race, Jim turns down the Palo Alto position and embraces his family and the team.

A series of texts shows that under White's guidance, the team becomes outstandingly successful, winning nine state titles over 14 years. All the members of the first team become the first in their families to go to college or into military careers. Almost all members continue to attend the practices that Jim White held for successive school cross country teams even after graduation from college. White continued teaching and coaching in McFarland until his retirement in 2003, after which he continued living in McFarland.

== Cast ==
- Kevin Costner as Jim White
- Maria Bello as Cheryl White
- Morgan Saylor as Julie White
- Martha Higareda as Lupe
- Michael Aguero as Damacio Diaz
- Sergio Avelar as Victor Puentes
- Hector Duran as Johnny Samaniego
- Rafael Martinez as David Diaz
- Johnny Ortiz as Jose Cardenas
- Carlos Pratts as Thomas Valles
- Ramiro Rodriguez as Danny Diaz
- Danny Mora as Sammy Rosaldo
- Valente Rodriguez as Principal Camillo
- Vanessa Martínez as Maria Marsol
- Chris Ellis as Coach Jenks
- Diana-Maria Riva as Señora Diaz
- Elsie Fisher as Jamie White
- Eloy Casados as Dale Padilla
- Natalia Cordova-Buckley as Señora Valles

== Production ==
William Broyles Jr. was hired to write the screenplay for the film, which was in development since 2004. Negotiations for Kevin Costner to star were finalized in July 2013. Principal photography took place in Camarillo, California, and many of McFarland's residents were extras in the movie.

=== Historical accuracy ===
In an interview, Jim White noted that while the film was based on a true story, it was not a documentary. He acknowledged that not everything in the film was factual, but that "it's still an enjoyable movie... it turned out fine." Some of the more notable differences included:

- Jim White had not been fired from numerous prior teaching jobs before starting at McFarland. He started teaching in the McFarland school district after graduating from Pepperdine University in 1964. During that time, McFarland was predominantly white in terms of demographics. White taught different subjects at numerous grade levels (fifth-grade science, seventh- and eighth-grade woodshop, and physical education) before starting his coaching career in 1980. White retired in 2003 after 23 years of coaching.
- White did not establish the cross-country team at the school, but instead restarted it after it had been dropped for a year. He rebuilt both the boys' and girls' cross-country teams, despite only the boys' team being featured in the film. Similarly, White took both teams to the California coast beach at Cayucos during the 1985 (not 1987) season.
- Not all of the runners from the 1987 team are featured in the film. Director Niki Caro wanted to feature more family in the film, so Luis Partida, who was on the team, was replaced with David Diaz, Damacio and Danny's brother. However, David graduated the year before McFarland's first state title win.
- Jim White and his wife Cheryl have three daughters, not two. Their oldest daughter, Tami, does not appear in the film. Julie and Jami are also portrayed relatively younger than their real ages at the time of McFarland's first state title win in 1987 (all three were in college during that time).
- Danny Diaz was not an overweight kid. However, he was the seventh runner on the team and still instrumental to its 1987 state title win.
- McFarland was not rivals with Palo Alto High School (the schools are four hours apart) nor did the schools ever race each other. This was made up to serve the plot.

== Release ==
The film was previously slated for a November 21, 2014, release, under the title McFarland, but was pushed back to February 20, 2015, and given a new title. The film was released in Canada under its original title, McFarland.

=== Home media ===
McFarland, USA was released on DVD and Blu-ray on June 2, 2015 by Walt Disney Studios Home Entertainment.

== Soundtrack ==
The soundtrack was released on February 17, 2015, through Walt Disney Records. It features original score composed by Antônio Pinto and songs heard in the film, with the original song "Juntos (Together)", performed by Juanes, released as a single on January 20, 2015.

== Reception ==
=== Box office ===
McFarland, USA grossed $44.5 million in North America and $1.2 million in other territories for a total gross of $45.7 million.

The film opened in North America on February 20, 2015 and earned $11 million in its opening weekend, finishing fourth at the box office.

=== Critical response ===
The review aggregator website Rotten Tomatoes has reported an 80% approval rating, based on 133 reviews, with a rating average of 6.7/10. The site's critical consensus reads, "Disney's inspirational sports drama formula might be old hat, but McFarland, USA proves it still works—especially with a talented director and eminently likable star in the mix." On Metacritic, which assigns a normalized rating, the film has a score of 60 out of 100, based on 32 critics, indicating "mixed or average reviews". In CinemaScore polls conducted during the opening weekend, cinema audiences gave the film an average grade of "A" on an A+ to F scale.

Stephen Farber of The Hollywood Reporter gave a positive review, writing that, "While the beats of the story are often stock, the picture benefits from sensitive direction by New Zealander Niki Caro and from a most appealing performance by Kevin Costner." James Rocchi of TheWrap wrote "A feel-good movie that earns all those good feelings, McFarland, USA might be running on a predetermined track, but the heart it shows along the journey is what makes it a winner." A. O. Scott of The New York Times described the film favorably as "a slick and safe Disney version of a fascinating and complicated reality", and that "Mr. Costner, with his knack for grumpy understatement, manages both to dominate the film and to deflect attention from himself."

=== Accolades ===
McFarland, USA was nominated at the 2015 Teen Choice Awards in the category Choice Movie: Drama.

== See also ==
- List of films about the sport of athletics
