= Sweetwater Independent School District =

School district in Texas

- Sweetwater, USA, Texas, 79556

District information
- Motto: Sweetwater Strong!
- Superintendent: Reggy Spencer
- Business administrator: Casey Bills
- Schools: 3 Elementary, 1 Intermediate, 1 Middle, 1 High
- Budget: $20 million
- NCES District ID: 4842030

Other information
- Website: www.sweetwaterisd.net

Sweetwater Independent School District is a public school district based in Sweetwater, Texas, USA. Located in Nolan County, the district extends into a portion of Fisher County.

The Sweetwater Independent School District serves approximately 2,253 students in grades pre-kindergarten through 12 on six campuses: high school, middle school, intermediate school, two elementary schools, and an early childhood center. Sweetwater ISD is also the fiscal agent for a nine-member school special education shared service arrangement.

== Schools ==
- Sweetwater High School [SHS] (Grades 9–12)
- Sweetwater Middle School [SMS] (Grades 6–8)
- Sweetwater Intermediate School (Grades 4–5)
- East Ridge Elementary School (Grades 2–3)
- Southeast Elementary School (Grades K-1)
- J.P. Cowen Elementary School (Pre-Kindergarten and Head Start/Early Head Start)

== Sports ==
- Newman Field, ballpark
