= McFarland High School (California) =

Location
- 259 Sherwood Ave. McFarland, California 93250; United States
- Coordinates: 35.674275°N 119.230113°W

Information
- School type: Comprehensive Public High School
- Motto: Opening the door to new opportunities...College and Beyond
- Opened: 1928
- Status: Operating
- School district: McFarland Unified School District
- CEEB code: 051945
- NCES School ID: 061954007315
- Principal: Dario Diaz
- Teaching staff: 29.05 (FTE)
- Grades: 9–12
- Gender: Coeducational
- Enrollment: 402 (2023-2024)
- Student to teacher ratio: 13.84
- Campus type: Rural
- Colors: Red & White
- Mascot: Cougars
- Website: School web site

McFarland High School is a public high school in McFarland, California, a city in Kern County north of Bakersfield and south of Fresno.

== Academics ==
The school's API score was 701 in 2013.

=== Enrollment ===
As of the 2023–24 school year, the school had an enrollment of 402 students and 29.05 classroom teachers (on an FTE basis), for a student–teacher ratio of 13.84:1. There were 220 students (54.7% of enrollment) eligible for free lunch and 3 (0.7% of students) eligible for reduced-cost lunch.

== Athletics ==
The school is notable for its succession of twenty-four CIF Central Section championships in cross country between 1987 and 2013. The success of the team is documented in the 2015 Walt Disney Pictures film McFarland, USA starring Kevin Costner as James White, a cross country coach at McFarland.

== See also ==
- McFarland, USA, a 2015 film set at the school
