= 2009 Minnesota Vikings season =

49th season in franchise history

- Owner: Zygi Wilf
- Head coach: Brad Childress
- Offensive coordinator: Darrell Bevell
- Defensive coordinator: Leslie Frazier
- Home stadium: Hubert H. Humphrey Metrodome

Results
- Record: 12–4
- Division place: 1st NFC North
- Playoffs: Won Divisional Playoffs (vs. Cowboys) 34–3; Lost NFC Championship (at Saints) 28–31 (OT)
- All-Pros: 4: RB Adrian Peterson (1st team); G Steve Hutchinson (1st team); DE Jared Allen (1st team); DT Kevin Williams (1st team)
- Pro Bowlers: 10: QB Brett Favre; RB Adrian Peterson; WR Sidney Rice; T Bryant McKinnie; G Steve Hutchinson; DE Jared Allen; DT Kevin Williams; CB Antoine Winfield; KR Percy Harvin; ST Heath Farwell

Uniform
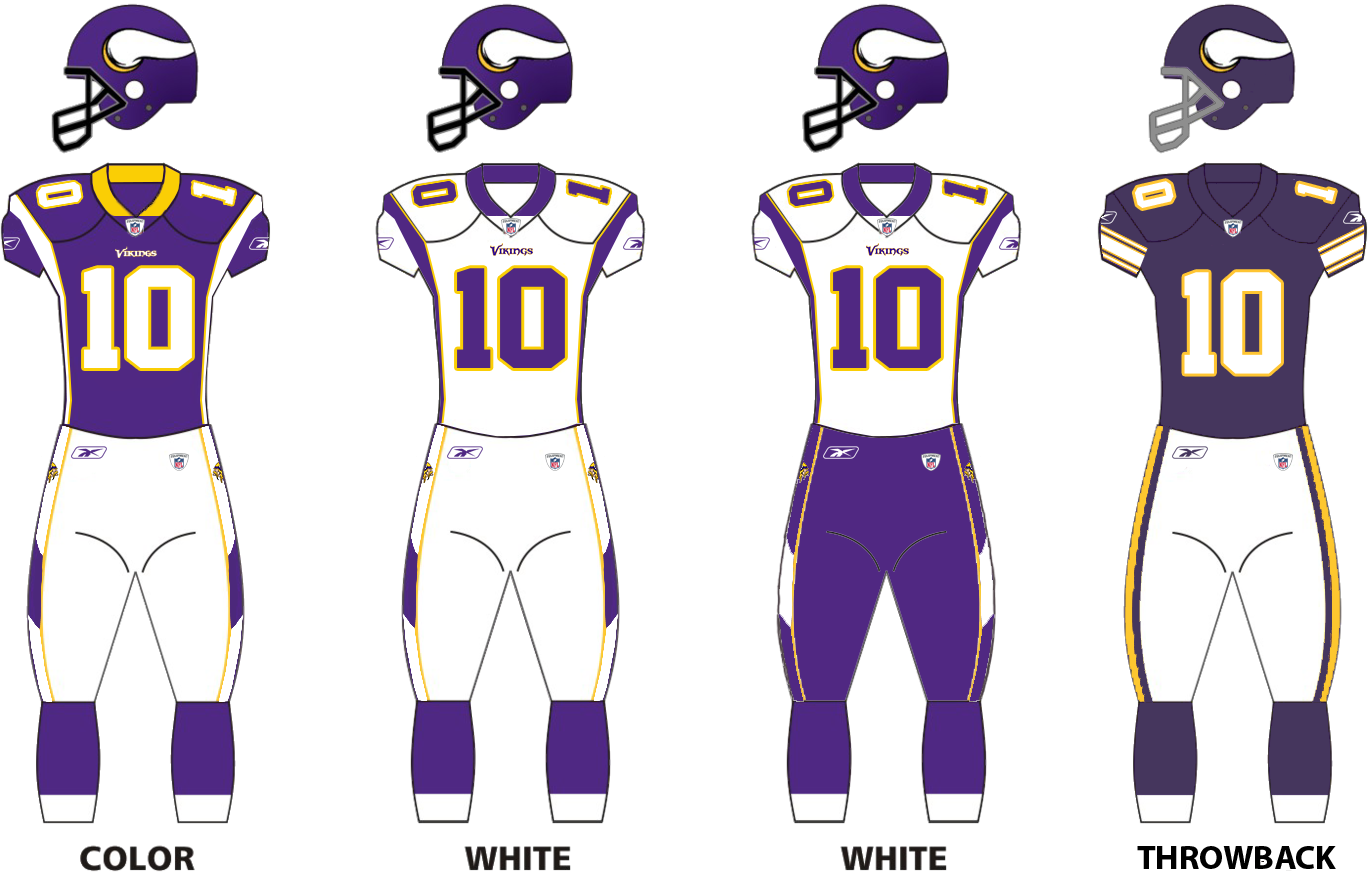

The 2009 season was the Minnesota Vikings' 49th in the National Football League (NFL) and their fourth under head coach Brad Childress. The Vikings improved upon their 10–6 record and defended their NFC North title from 2008, their first successful defense of a divisional title since they won six NFC Central titles in a row between 1973 and 1978. They beat the Dallas Cowboys in the NFC Divisional Playoff at the Hubert H. Humphrey Metrodome in Minneapolis, but lost the NFC Championship Game 31–28 in overtime to the eventual Super Bowl champion New Orleans Saints, missing out on what would have been their first Super Bowl since Super Bowl XI in 1976. This year's NFC Championship Game is also dubbed by Roger Goodell as the "Bountygate Game" which resulted in several players and coaching staff (including head coach Sean Payton) receiving 12-month suspensions three years later. The Vikings had 10 Pro Bowlers and four All-Pros on their roster, both league-highs for the season.

As of 2026, this is the most recent time the Vikings have made the playoffs in consecutive seasons.

== Offseason ==
=== Player and personnel moves ===
Quarterback Brett Favre announced that he would not sign with the Minnesota Vikings on July 28, 2009, after much speculation that he would. Less than a month later, however, Favre signed a 2-year contract worth $25 million with the Vikings.

==== Releases and injuries ====
On February 18, the team released running back Maurice Hicks.

On February 27, the team released quarterback Gus Frerotte.

On March 3, the team released linebacker Vinny Ciurciu.

On March 4, free agent center Matt Birk left the Vikings to join the Baltimore Ravens.

On March 18, free agent safety Darren Sharper left the Vikings to join the New Orleans Saints.

==== Signings and extensions ====
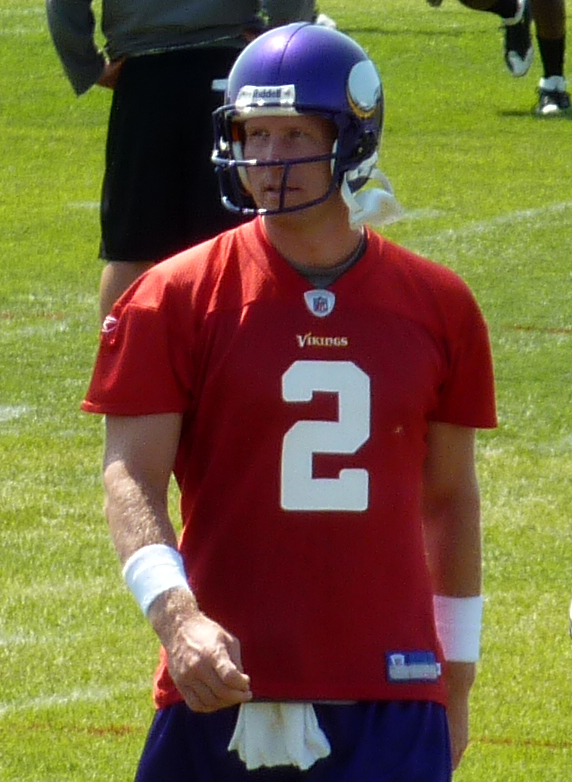
Sage Rosenfels was the Vikings' third-string quarterback in 2009.

On February 24, the team re-signed cornerback Charles Gordon to a 1-year $1 million contract.

On February 26, the team re-signed defensive end Jayme Mitchell to a 2-year deal.

On February 27, the Vikings traded a 2009 4th round pick to the Houston Texans for quarterback Sage Rosenfels. They then signed Rosenfels to a 2-year $9 million contract extension that will run ball ride 2011.

On February 27, the team re-signed tight end Jim Kleinsasser to a 3-year $9 million contract.

On March 6, the team re-signed linebacker Heath Farwell to a 3-year $7.75 million contract.

On March 9, the team re-signed cornerback Benny Sapp to a 1-year contract.

On March 11, the team re-signed defensive tackle Jimmy Kennedy to a 1-year contract.

On March 19, the Vikings signed cornerback Karl Paymah and wide receiver Glenn Holt.

On March 21, cornerback Cedric Griffin signed a 3-year contract extension.

On March 27, the team matched the Bengals' offer sheet for RFA fullback Naufahu Tahi.

On March 31, the team re-signed defensive end Otis Grigsby to a 1-year deal.

On April 6, the team re-signed defensive tackle Fred Evans to a 1-year deal.

On July 24, Antoine Winfield and the Vikings agreed on a 5-year extension through the 2013 season.

On August 18, after months of negotiations, the team signed formerly retired quarterback Brett Favre.

=== 2009 draft ===
The Vikings had five selections in the 2009 NFL draft; they had traded their fourth-round selection to the Houston Texans for quarterback Sage Rosenfels and, back in 2007, they had traded their sixth-round selection to the Philadelphia Eagles in exchange for quarterback Kelly Holcomb. In 2008, they received an extra 2009 seventh-round selection from the Washington Redskins for defensive end Erasmus James, but they used that extra pick to move from spot #158 to #150 in the fifth round.

The Vikings' top two selections, WR Percy Harvin and OT Phil Loadholt, both soon became 1st string players, while Jasper Brinkley finished the season as the team's starting MLB after E.J. Henderson suffered a broken leg in a Week 13 game against the Arizona Cardinals. Harvin was also voted the Offensive Rookie of the Year and was named as the NFC's starting kick returner for the 2010 Pro Bowl on January 31, 2010.

Pro Bowler

2009 Minnesota Vikings Draft
Draft order		Player name	Position	College	Contract	Notes
Round	Selection	Player name	Position	College	Contract	Notes
1	22	Percy Harvin	WR	Florida	5 years	
2	54	Phil Loadholt	OT	Oklahoma	4 years	
3	86	Asher Allen	CB	Georgia	4 years	
4	122	Traded to the Houston Texans (Note: The Vikings traded their fourth-round selection (122nd overall) to the Texans in exchange for QB Sage Rosenfels.)				
5	150	Jasper Brinkley	LB	South Carolina	4 years	From Redskins (Note: The Vikings traded their fifth- and seventh-round selections (158th and 221st overall) to the Redskins in exchange for the a fifth-round selection (150th overall).)
5	158	Traded to the Washington Redskins				
6	195	Traded to the Philadelphia Eagles (Note: The Vikings traded their sixth-round selection (195th overall) to the Eagles in exchange for QB Kelly Holcomb.)				
7	221	Traded to the Washington Redskins				From Redskins (Note: The Vikings traded DE Erasmus James to the Redskins in exchange for a seventh-round selection (221st overall).)
7	231	Jamarca Sanford	S	Ole Miss	4 years	

=== Undrafted free agents ===
Name	Position	College
Colt Anderson	Safety	Montana
Kahlil Bell	Running back	UCLA
Jon Cooper	Center	Oklahoma
Robert Francois	Linebacker	Boston College
Juan Garcia	Center	Washington
Sean Glennon	Quarterback	Virginia Tech
De’von Hall	Safety	Utah State
Antoine Holmes	Defensive tackle	NC State
lan Johnson	Running back	Boise State
Tremaine Johnson	Defensive tackle	LSU
Andy Kemp	Guard	Wisconsin
Bobby Lepori	Offensive tackle	Fresno State
Nick Moore	Wide receiver	Toledo
Vinny Perretta	Wide receiver	Boise State
Nick Urban	Guard	Winona State
Nick Walker	Tight end	Alabama
Bobby Williams	Wide receiver	North Alabama

== Staff ==
2009 Minnesota Vikings staff
Front office: Owner/chairman – Zygi Wilf; Owner/president – Mark Wilf; Owner/vice chairman – Leonard Wilf; Vice president of football operations – Rob Brzezinski; Vice president of player personnel – Rick Spielman; Director of player personnel – George Paton; Director of college scouting – Scott Studwell; Assistant director of college scouting – Jamaal Stephenson; Head coaches: Head coach – Brad Childress; Assistant to the head coach – Dennis Polian; Offensive coaches: Offensive coordinator – Darrell Bevell; Quarterbacks – Kevin Rogers; Running backs – Eric Bieniemy; Wide receivers – George Stewart; Assistant wide receivers – Ryan Ficken; Tight ends – Jimmie Johnson; Offensive line – Pat Morris; Assistant offensive line – Jim Hueber; Offensive quality control/assistant quarterbacks – Kevin Stefanski	Defensive coaches: Defensive coordinator – Leslie Frazier; Defensive line – Karl Dunbar; Defensive line – Ryan Silverfield; Assistant defensive line – Diron Reynolds; Linebackers – Fred Pagac; Defensive backs/secondary – Joe Woods; Assistant secondary – Derek Mason; Defensive assistant – Jeff Imamura; Special teams coaches: Special teams coordinator – Brian Murphy; Assistant special teams – Chris White; Assistant special teams/assistant director of player development – Jason Glenn; Strength and conditioning: Head athletic trainer/director of sports medicine – Eric Sugarman; Strength and conditioning – Tom Kanavy; Assistant strength and conditioning – Juney Barnett; Assistant strength and conditioning – Martin Streight

== Roster ==
2009 Minnesota Vikings roster
Quarterbacks (QB): 4 Brett Favre; 7 Tarvaris Jackson; 2 Sage Rosenfels; Running backs (RB): 45 Garrett Mills; 28 Adrian Peterson; 38 Naufahu Tahi FB; 29 Chester Taylor; 34 Albert Young; Wide receivers (WR): 87 Bernard Berrian; 12 Percy Harvin KR; 11 Jaymar Johnson PR; 17 Greg Lewis; 82 Darius Reynaud; 18 Sidney Rice; Tight ends (TE): 83 Jeff Dugan; 40 Jim Kleinsasser; 81 Visanthe Shiancoe	Offensive linemen (OL): 62 Ryan Cook; 68 Jon Cooper C; 64 Anthony Herrera G; 79 Artis Hicks G/T; 76 Steve Hutchinson G; 71 Phil Loadholt T; 74 Bryant McKinnie T; 65 John Sullivan C; Defensive linemen (DL): 69 Jared Allen DE; 91 Ray Edwards DE; 90 Fred Evans DT; 98 Letroy Guion DT; 73 Jimmy Kennedy DT; 92 Jayme Mitchell DE; 96 Brian Robison DE; 93 Kevin Williams DT; 94 Pat Williams DT	Linebackers (LB): 54 Jasper Brinkley MLB; 59 Heath Farwell OLB; 52 Chad Greenway OLB; 51 Ben Leber OLB; 57 Jeremy Leman MLB; 55 Kenny Onatolu OLB; Defensive backs (DB): 39 Husain Abdullah FS; 21 Asher Allen CB; 37 Eric Frampton SS; 23 Cedric Griffin CB; 25 Tyrell Johnson SS; 41 Karl Paymah CB; 33 Jamarca Sanford SS; 22 Benny Sapp CB; 20 Madieu Williams FS; 26 Antoine Winfield CB; Special teams (ST): 5 Chris Kluwe P; 46 Cullen Loeffler LS; 8 Ryan Longwell K	Practice squad: 49 Colt Anderson S; 78 Patrick Brown T; 75 Chris Clark T; 42 Ian Johnson RB; 67 Tremaine Johnson DT; 15 Vinny Perretta WR; 60 Drew Radovich T; 24 DeAndre Wright CB; Reserve: 56 E. J. Henderson LB (IR); 50 Erin Henderson LB (Susp.); Rookies in italics 53 active, 2 reserve, 8 practice squad

== Preseason ==
=== Schedule ===
Week	Date	Opponent	Result	Record	Venue	NFL.com recap
1	August 14	at Indianapolis Colts	W 13–3	1–0	Lucas Oil Stadium	Recap
2	August 21	Kansas City Chiefs	W 17–13	2–0	Hubert H. Humphrey Metrodome	Recap
3	August 31	at Houston Texans	W 17–10	3–0	Reliant Stadium	Recap
4	September 4	Dallas Cowboys	L 31–35	3–1	Hubert H. Humphrey Metrodome	Recap

=== Game summaries ===
==== Week 1: at Indianapolis Colts ====
Preseason Week 1: Minnesota Vikings at Indianapolis Colts – Game summary

Quarter	1	2	3	4	Total
Vikings	7	6	0	0	13
Colts	0	3	0	0	3

at Lucas Oil Stadium, Indianapolis, Indiana

- Date: August 14
- Game time: 6:35 p.m.
- Game weather: Sunny, 84 °F (29 °C)
- Game attendance: 65,484
- Referee: Bill Leavy (127)
- Recap, Game Book

Game information

First quarter

- MIN – Chester Taylor 5-yard run (Ryan Longwell kick), 8:42. Vikings 7–0. Drive: 11 plays, 72 yards, 6:18.

Second quarter

- MIN – Ryan Longwell 35-yard field goal, 14:52. Vikings 10–0. Drive: 12 plays, 75 yards, 5:36.
- IND – Shane Andrus 42-yard field goal, 8:27. Vikings 10–3. Drive: 7 plays, 58 yards, 3:18.
- MIN – Ryan Longwell 36-yard field goal, 2:00. Vikings 13–3. Drive: 14 plays, 49 yards, 6:27.

Third quarter

- No scoring plays.

Fourth quarter

- No scoring plays.

Top passers

- MIN – Sage Rosenfels – 10/13, 91 yards
- IND – Curtis Painter – 10/17, 77 yards

Top rushers

- MIN – Albert Young – 14 rushes, 58 yards
- IND – Donald Brown – 5 rushes, 58 yards

Top receivers

- MIN – Visanthe Shiancoe – 4 receptions, 55 yards
- IND – John Matthews – 3 receptions, 30 yards

==== Week 2: vs. Kansas City Chiefs ====
Preseason Week 2: Kansas City Chiefs at Minnesota Vikings – Game summary

Quarter	1	2	3	4	Total
Chiefs	3	7	3	0	13
Vikings	0	7	7	3	17

at Hubert H. Humphrey Metrodome, Minneapolis, Minnesota

- Date: August 21
- Game time: 7:05 p.m.
- Game weather: None (indoor stadium)
- Game attendance: 62,782
- Referee: Ron Winter (14)
- Recap, Game Book

Game information

First quarter

- KC – Ryan Succop 32-yard field goal, 5:56. Chiefs 3–0. Drive: 9 plays, 38 yards, 4:36.

Second quarter

- KC – Dwayne Bowe 4-yard pass from Matt Cassel (Ryan Succop kick), 11:02. Chiefs 10–0. Drive: 8 plays, 66 yards, 3:58.
- MIN – Visanthe Shiancoe 13-yard pass from Tarvaris Jackson (Ryan Longwell kick), 2:18. Chiefs 10–7. Drive: 15 plays, 92 yards, 8:44.

Third quarter

- KC – Ryan Succop 37-yard field goal, 5:36. Chiefs 13–7. Drive: 16 plays, 64 yards, 7:46.
- MIN – Darius Reynaud 64-yard pass from Tarvaris Jackson (Taylor Mehlhaff kick), 4:03. Vikings 14–13. Drive: 4 plays, 80 yards, 1:33.

Fourth quarter

- MIN – Taylor Mehlhaff 29-yard field goal, 8:37. Vikings 17–13. Drive: 11 plays, 61 yards, 5:19.

Top passers

- KC – Matt Cassel – 9/14, 99 yards, TD
- MIN – Tarvaris Jackson – 12/15, 202 yards, 2 TD

Top rushers

- KC – Jackie Battle – 9 rushes, 28 yards
- MIN – Adrian Peterson – 10 rushes, 44 yards

Top receivers

- KC – Dwayne Bowe – 3 receptions, 37 yards, TD
- MIN – Darius Reynaud – 2 receptions, 88 yards, TD

Brett Favre made his Minnesota Vikings debut, going 1–4 for just four yards and no first downs converted in his two series under center; he nonetheless got a standing ovation from the sellout crowd at the Metrodome. Tarvaris Jackson completed two touchdowns, a 13-yard score to Visanthe Shiancoe and a 64-yarder to Darius Reynaud.

==== Week 3: at Houston Texans ====
Preseason Week 3: Minnesota Vikings at Houston Texans – Game summary

Quarter	1	2	3	4	Total
Vikings	7	10	0	0	17
Texans	0	10	0	0	10

at Reliant Stadium, Houston, Texas

- Date: August 31
- Game time: 7:05 p.m.
- Game weather: Sunny, 86 °F (30 °C)
- Game attendance: 70,191
- Referee: Carl Cheffers (51)
- Recap, Game Book

Game information

First quarter

- MIN – Adrian Peterson 75-yard run (Ryan Longwell kick), 14:42. Vikings 7–0. Drive: 1 play, 75 yards, 0:18.

Second quarter

- MIN – Ryan Longwell 36-yard field goal, 10:38. Vikings 10–0. Drive: 6 plays, 6 yards, 2:26.
- HOU – Steve Slaton 4-yard run (Kris Brown kick), 3:38. Vikings 10–7. Drive: 11 plays, 71 yards, 7:00.
- MIN – Chester Taylor 28-yard pass from Brett Favre (Ryan Longwell kick), 0:27. Vikings 17–7. Drive: 9 plays, 74 yards, 3:11.
- HOU – Kris Brown 46-yard field goal, 0:00. Vikings 17–10. Drive: 4 plays, 37 yards, 0:27.

Third quarter

- No scoring plays.

Fourth quarter

- No scoring plays.

Top passers

- MIN – Brett Favre – 13/18, 142 yards, TD
- HOU – Matt Schaub – 10/14, 108 yards, INT

Top rushers

- MIN – Adrian Peterson – 11 rushes, 117 yards, TD
- HOU – Steve Slaton – 12 rushes, 27 yards, TD

Top receivers

- MIN – Chester Taylor – 3 receptions, 41 yards, TD
- HOU – Andre Johnson – 3 receptions, 61 yards

Brett Favre completed 13 of 18 passes for 142 yards, including a 28-yard touchdown pass to running back Chester Taylor. Favre even got physical, laying a block (albeit an illegal one) on Texans safety Eugene Wilson.

==== Week 4: vs. Dallas Cowboys ====
Preseason Week 4: Dallas Cowboys at Minnesota Vikings – Game summary

Quarter	1	2	3	4	Total
Cowboys	7	0	14	14	35
Vikings	7	14	7	3	31

at Hubert H. Humphrey Metrodome, Minneapolis, Minnesota

- Date: September 4
- Game time: 7:05 p.m.
- Game weather: None (indoor stadium)
- Game attendance: 62,334
- Referee: Don Carey (126)
- Recap, Game Book

Game information

First quarter

- DAL – Kevin Ogletree 5-yard pass from Jon Kitna (Nick Folk kick), 9:01. Cowboys 7–0. Drive: 12 plays, 71 yards, 5:59.
- MIN – Jeff Dugan 36-yard pass from Tarvaris Jackson (Ryan Longwell kick), 7:06. Tied 7–7. Drive: 2 plays, 36 yards, 0:13.

Second quarter

- MIN – Ian Johnson 1-yard run (Ryan Longwell kick), 10:40. Vikings 14–7. Drive: 6 plays, 25 yards, 2:28.
- MIN – Darius Reynaud 81-yard punt return (Ryan Longwell kick), 9:12. Vikings 21–7.

Third quarter

- DAL – Pat Watkins 23-yard interception return (Nick Folk kick), 14:54. Vikings 21–14.
- DAL – Steve Octavien 44-yard interception return (Nick Folk kick), 12:25. Tied 21–21.
- MIN – Ian Johnson 2-yard run (Ryan Longwell kick), 5:33. Vikings 28–21. Drive: 6 plays, 30 yards, 2:30.

Fourth quarter

- MIN – Ryan Longwell 41-yard field goal, 14:57. Vikings 31–21. Drive: 6 plays, 57 yards, 3:05.
- DAL – Scott Chandler 4-yard pass from Rudy Carpenter (Nick Folk kick), 7:21. Vikings 31–28. Drive: 14 plays, 77 yards, 7:36.
- DAL – Jesse Holley 82-yard punt return (Nick Folk kick), 2:51. Cowboys 35–31.

Top passers

- DAL – Rudy Carpenter – 12/18, 125 yards, TD
- MIN – Sage Rosenfels – 7/15, 115 yards, INT

Top rushers

- DAL – Julius Crosslin – 9 rushes, 42 yards
- MIN – Ian Johnson – 17 rushes, 61 yards, 2 TD

Top receivers

- DAL – John Phillips – 3 receptions, 75 yards
- MIN – Bobby Williams – 2 receptions, 53 yards

== Regular season ==
As well as playing their NFC North rivals both at home and on the road, the Vikings were scheduled to face opponents from the AFC North and the NFC West. They were also handed fixtures against the Carolina Panthers from the NFC South and the New York Giants from the NFC East by virtue of having won their division in 2008. Based on their opponents' results in 2008, the Vikings had the second-easiest schedule in the league in 2009, with their opponents having an overall record of 107–148–1 (.420) in 2008.

=== Schedule ===
Week	Date	Opponent	Result	Record	Venue	NFL.com recap
1	September 13	at Cleveland Browns	**W** 34–20	1–0	Cleveland Browns Stadium	Recap
2	September 20	at **Detroit Lions**	**W** 27–13	2–0	Ford Field	Recap
3	September 27	San Francisco 49ers	**W** 27–24	3–0	Hubert H. Humphrey Metrodome	Recap
4	October 5	**Green Bay Packers**	**W** 30–23	4–0	Mall of America Field	Recap
5	October 11	at St. Louis Rams	**W** 38–10	5–0	Edward Jones Dome	Recap
6	October 18	Baltimore Ravens	**W** 33–31	6–0	Mall of America Field	Recap
7	October 25	at Pittsburgh Steelers	**L** 17–27	6–1	Heinz Field	Recap
8	November 1	at **Green Bay Packers**	**W** 38–26	7–1	Lambeau Field	Recap
9	Bye week					
10	November 15	**Detroit Lions**	**W** 27–10	8–1	Mall of America Field	Recap
11	November 22	Seattle Seahawks	**W** 35–9	9–1	Mall of America Field	Recap
12	November 29	**Chicago Bears**	**W** 36–10	10–1	Mall of America Field	Recap
13	December 6	at Arizona Cardinals	**L** 17–30	10–2	University of Phoenix Stadium	Recap
14	December 13	Cincinnati Bengals	**W** 30–10	11–2	Mall of America Field	Recap
15	December 20	at Carolina Panthers	**L** 7–26	11–3	Bank of America Stadium	Recap
16	December 28	at **Chicago Bears**	**L** 30–36 (OT)	11–4	Soldier Field	Recap
17	January 3	New York Giants	**W** 44–7	12–4	Mall of America Field	Recap
Note: Intra-division opponents are in **bold** text.

=== Game summaries ===
==== Week 1: at Cleveland Browns ====
Week 1: Minnesota Vikings at Cleveland Browns – Game summary

Quarter	1	2	3	4	Total
**Vikings**	3	7	14	10	**34**
Browns	3	10	0	7	**20**

at Cleveland Browns Stadium, Cleveland, Ohio

- Date: September 13
- Game time: 12:00 p.m.
- Game weather: Sunny, 70 °F (21 °C)
- Game attendance: 70,560
- Referee: John Parry (132)
- TV announcers (Fox): Thom Brennaman, Brian Billick and Charissa Thompson
- Recap, Game Book

Game information

**First quarter**

- CLE – Phil Dawson 37-yard field goal, 11:28. Browns 3–0. **Drive: 8 plays, 31 yards, 3:32.**
- MIN – Ryan Longwell 21-yard field goal, 0:03. Tied 3–3. **Drive: 12 plays, 46 yards, 6:52.**

**Second quarter**

- MIN – Adrian Peterson 1-yard run (Ryan Longwell kick), 11:09. Vikings 10–3. **Drive: 4 plays, 23 yards, 1:47.**
- CLE – Phil Dawson 20-yard field goal, 5:57. Vikings 10–6. **Drive: 9 plays, 73 yards, 5:12.**
- CLE – Joshua Cribbs 67-yard punt return (Phil Dawson kick), 1:30. Browns 13–10.

**Third quarter**

- MIN – Adrian Peterson 1-yard run (Ryan Longwell kick), 10:07. Vikings 17–13. **Drive: 9 plays, 55 yards, 4:53.**
- MIN – Percy Harvin 6-yard pass from Brett Favre (Ryan Longwell kick), 1:06. Vikings 24–13. **Drive: 13 plays, 82 yards, 7:32.**

**Fourth quarter**

- MIN – Ryan Longwell 37-yard field goal, 6:55. Vikings 27–13. **Drive: 6 plays, 14 yards, 3:06.**
- MIN – Adrian Peterson 64-yard run (Ryan Longwell kick), 5:58. Vikings 34–13. **Drive: 1 play, 64 yards, 0:13.**
- CLE – Robert Royal 26-yard pass from Brady Quinn (Phil Dawson kick), 0:28. Vikings 34–20. **Drive: 9 plays, 80 yards, 2:35.**

**Top passers**

- MIN – Brett Favre – 14/21, 110 yards, TD
- CLE – Brady Quinn – 21/35, 205 yards, TD, INT

**Top rushers**

- MIN – Adrian Peterson – 25 rushes, 180 yards, 3 TD
- CLE – Jamal Lewis – 11 rushes, 57 yards

**Top receivers**

- MIN – Percy Harvin – 3 receptions, 36 yards, TD
- CLE – Robert Royal – 4 receptions, 60 yards, TD

The Vikings began their season at Cleveland Browns Stadium for a Week 1 interconference duel with the Cleveland Browns. In the first quarter, Minnesota trailed as Browns kicker Phil Dawson got a 37-yard field goal. The Vikings answered with kicker Ryan Longwell making a 21-yard field goal. In the second quarter, Minnesota took the lead as running back Adrian Peterson got a 1-yard touchdown run. Cleveland retook their lead as Dawson kicked a 20-yard field goal, along with wide receiver Joshua Cribbs returning a punt 67 yards for a touchdown.

In the third quarter, the Vikings took control as Peterson got a 1-yard touchdown run, along with quarterback Brett Favre completing a 6-yard touchdown pass to rookie wide receiver Percy Harvin. Afterwards, Minnesota put the game out of reach in the fourth quarter; Ryan Longwell nailed a 37-yard field goal, while Adrian Peterson got a 64-yard touchdown run. The Browns closed out the game with quarterback Brady Quinn completing a 26-yard touchdown pass to tight end Robert Royal.

With the win, the Vikings began their season at 1–0.

==== Week 2: at Detroit Lions ====
Week 2: Minnesota Vikings at Detroit Lions – Game summary

Quarter	1	2	3	4	Total
**Vikings**	0	7	10	10	**27**
Lions	3	7	0	3	**13**

at Ford Field, Detroit, Michigan

- Date: September 20
- Game time: 12:00 p.m.
- Game weather: None (indoor stadium)
- Game attendance: 56,269
- Referee: Carl Cheffers (51)
- TV announcers (Fox): Ron Pitts and John Lynch
- Recap, Game Book

Game information

**First quarter**

- DET – Jason Hanson 30-yard field goal, 5:05. Lions 3–0. **Drive: 12 plays, 40 yards, 6:21.**

**Second quarter**

- DET – Calvin Johnson 8-yard pass from Matthew Stafford (Jason Hanson kick), 5:40. Lions 10–0. **Drive: 9 plays, 75 yards, 4:16.**
- MIN – Visanthe Shiancoe 1-yard pass from Brett Favre (Ryan Longwell kick), 1:04. Lions 10–7. **Drive: 10 plays, 76 yards, 4:36.**

**Third quarter**

- MIN – Ryan Longwell 26-yard field goal, 8:38. Tied 10–10. **Drive: 10 plays, 39 yards, 4:15.**
- MIN – Adrian Peterson 27-yard run (Ryan Longwell kick), 7:45. Vikings 17–10. **Drive: 1 play, 27 yards, 0:09.**

**Fourth quarter**

- MIN – Ryan Longwell 46-yard field goal, 9:56. Vikings 20–10. **Drive: 9 plays, 55 yards, 5:45.**
- MIN – Percy Harvin 3-yard pass from Brett Favre (Ryan Longwell kick), 5:58. Vikings 27–10. **Drive: 3 plays, 16 yards, 1:23.**
- DET – Jason Hanson 48-yard field goal, 2:37. Vikings 27–13. **Drive: 15 plays, 44 yards, 3:21.**

**Top passers**

- MIN – Brett Favre – 23/27, 155 yards, 2 TD
- DET – Matthew Stafford – 18/30, 152 yards, TD, 2 INT

**Top rushers**

- MIN – Adrian Peterson – 15 rushes, 92 yards, TD
- DET – Kevin Smith – 24 rushes, 83 yards

**Top receivers**

- MIN – Bernard Berrian – 6 receptions, 46 yards
- DET – Calvin Johnson – 5 receptions, 51 yards, TD

Coming off their road win over the Browns, the Vikings flew to Ford Field for a Week 2 NFC North duel with the Detroit Lions. Minnesota trailed early as Lions kicker Jason Hanson got a 30-yard field goal. Detroit added to their lead in the second quarter as quarterback Matthew Stafford completed an 8-yard touchdown pass to wide receiver Calvin Johnson. The Vikings ended the half with a 1-yard touchdown pass from quarterback Brett Favre to tight end Visanthe Shiancoe.

In the third quarter, Minnesota took the lead as kicker Ryan Longwell made a 46-yard field goal, followed by running back Adrian Peterson getting a 27-yard touchdown run. The Vikings pulled away as Longwell nailed a 46-yard field goal, followed by Favre completing a 3-yard touchdown pass to rookie wide receiver Percy Harvin. The Lions completed the scoring as Hanson got a 48-yard field goal.

With the win, the Vikings improved to 2–0.

==== Week 3: vs. San Francisco 49ers ====
Week 3: San Francisco 49ers at Minnesota Vikings – Game summary

Quarter	1	2	3	4	Total
49ers	0	14	3	7	**24**
**Vikings**	7	6	7	7	**27**

at Hubert H. Humphrey Metrodome, Minneapolis, Minnesota

- Date: September 27
- Game time: 12:00 p.m.
- Game weather: None (indoor stadium)
- Game attendance: 63,398
- Referee: Jerome Boger (23)
- TV announcers (Fox): Sam Rosen, Tim Ryan and Nischelle Turner
- Recap, Game Book

Game information

**First quarter**

- MIN – Sidney Rice 30-yard pass from Brett Favre (Ryan Longwell kick), 8:38. Vikings 7–0. **Drive: 6 plays, 88 yards, 2:36.**

**Second quarter**

- MIN – Ryan Longwell 40-yard field goal, 13:09. Vikings 10–0. **Drive: 7 plays, 12 yards, 1:51.**
- SF – Vernon Davis 5-yard pass from Shaun Hill (Joe Nedney kick), 9:26. Vikings 10–7. **Drive: 7 plays, 57 yards, 3:43.**
- MIN – Ryan Longwell 52-yard field goal, 3:26. Vikings 13–7. **Drive: 7 plays, 39 yards, 2:53.**
- SF – Nate Clements 59-yard return of blocked field goal (Joe Nedney kick), 0:00. 49ers 14–13.

**Third quarter**

- SF – Joe Nedney 37-yard field goal, 4:47. 49ers 17–13. **Drive: 8 plays, 42 yards, 4:37.**
- MIN – Percy Harvin 101-yard kickoff return (Ryan Longwell kick), 4:34. Vikings 20–17. **Drive: 0 plays, 0 yards, 0:13.**

**Fourth quarter**

- SF – Vernon Davis 20-yard pass from Shaun Hill (Joe Nedney kick), 8:12. 49ers 24–20. **Drive: 6 plays, 80 yards, 4:37.**
- MIN – Greg Lewis 32-yard pass from Brett Favre (Ryan Longwell kick), 0:02. Vikings 27–24. **Drive: 10 plays, 80 yards, 1:27.**

**Top passers**

- SF – Shaun Hill – 15/25, 195 yards, 2 TD, INT
- MIN – Brett Favre – 24/46, 301 yards, 2 TD, INT

**Top rushers**

- SF – Glen Coffee – 25 rushes, 54 yards
- MIN – Adrian Peterson – 19 rushes, 85 yards

**Top receivers**

- SF – Vernon Davis – 7 receptions, 96 yards, 2 TD
- MIN – Chester Taylor – 7 receptions, 70 yards

Coming off their divisional road win over the Lions, the Vikings played their Week 3 home opener against the San Francisco 49ers. Minnesota opened in the first quarter with quarterback Brett Favre's 30-yard touchdown pass to wide receiver Sidney Rice. The Vikings added onto their lead in the second quarter with kicker Ryan Longwell's 40-yard field goal, but the 49ers answered with quarterback Shaun Hill's 5-yard touchdown pass to tight end Vernon Davis. Minnesota came back with Longwell's 52-yard field goal, but San Francisco took the lead prior to halftime as cornerback Nate Clements returned a blocked field goal 59 yards for a touchdown.

The 49ers increased their lead in the second half with kicker Joe Nedney's 37-yard field goal, but the Vikings immediately responded with rookie wide receiver Percy Harvin returning a kickoff 101 yards for a touchdown. In the fourth quarter, San Francisco got the lead again with Hill hooking up with Davis on a 20-yard touchdown pass. Afterwards, Minnesota came up with a dramatic win as Favre completed a game-winning 32-yard touchdown pass to wide receiver Greg Lewis with 2 seconds remaining in the game. The pass was later awarded an ESPY for "Best Play". The game was also voted as the best game of the regular season by voters on NFL.com.

With the win, the Vikings improved to 3–0.

==== Week 4: vs. Green Bay Packers ====
Week 4: Green Bay Packers at Minnesota Vikings – Game summary

Quarter	1	2	3	4	Total
Packers	7	7	0	9	**23**
**Vikings**	7	14	7	2	**30**

at Mall of America Field at Hubert H. Humphrey Metrodome, Minneapolis, Minnesota

- Date: October 5
- Game time: 7:30 p.m.
- Game weather: None (indoor stadium)
- Game attendance: 63,846
- Referee: Gene Steratore (114)
- TV announcers (ESPN): Mike Tirico, Ron Jaworski and Jon Gruden
- Recap, Game Book

Game information

**First quarter**

- MIN – Visanthe Shiancoe 1-yard pass from Brett Favre (Ryan Longwell kick), 3:20. Vikings 7–0. **Drive: 12 plays, 67 yards, 6:02.**
- GB – Jermichael Finley 62-yard pass from Aaron Rodgers (Mason Crosby kick), 2:16. Tied 7–7. **Drive: 3 plays, 67 yards, 1:04.**

**Second quarter**

- MIN – Sidney Rice 14-yard pass from Brett Favre (Ryan Longwell kick), 4:59. Vikings 14–7. **Drive: 10 plays, 77 yards, 6:43.**
- GB – Clay Matthews 42-yard fumble return (Mason Crosby kick), 3:18. Tied 14–14.
- MIN – Adrian Peterson 1-yard run (Ryan Longwell kick), 0:30. Vikings 21–14. **Drive: 6 plays, 84 yards, 2:48.**

**Third quarter**

- MIN – Bernard Berrian 31-yard pass from Brett Favre (Ryan Longwell kick), 10:40. Vikings 28–14. **Drive: 8 plays, 80 yards, 4:20.**

**Fourth quarter**

- MIN – Aaron Rodgers sacked in end zone by Jared Allen for safety, 7:21. Vikings 30–14.
- GB – Jordy Nelson 33-yard pass from Aaron Rodgers (pass failed), 3:40. Vikings 30–20. **Drive: 6 plays, 96 yards, 1:19.**
- GB – Mason Crosby 31-yard field goal, 0:55. Vikings 30–23. **Drive: 9 plays, 68 yards, 2:15.**

**Top passers**

- GB – Aaron Rodgers – 26/37, 384 yards, 2 TD, INT
- MIN – Brett Favre – 24/31, 271 yards, 3 TD

**Top rushers**

- GB – Ryan Grant – 11 rushes, 51 yards
- MIN – Adrian Peterson – 25 rushes, 55 yards, TD

**Top receivers**

- GB – Jermichael Finley – 6 receptions, 128 yards, TD
- MIN – Bernard Berrian – 6 receptions, 75 yards, TD

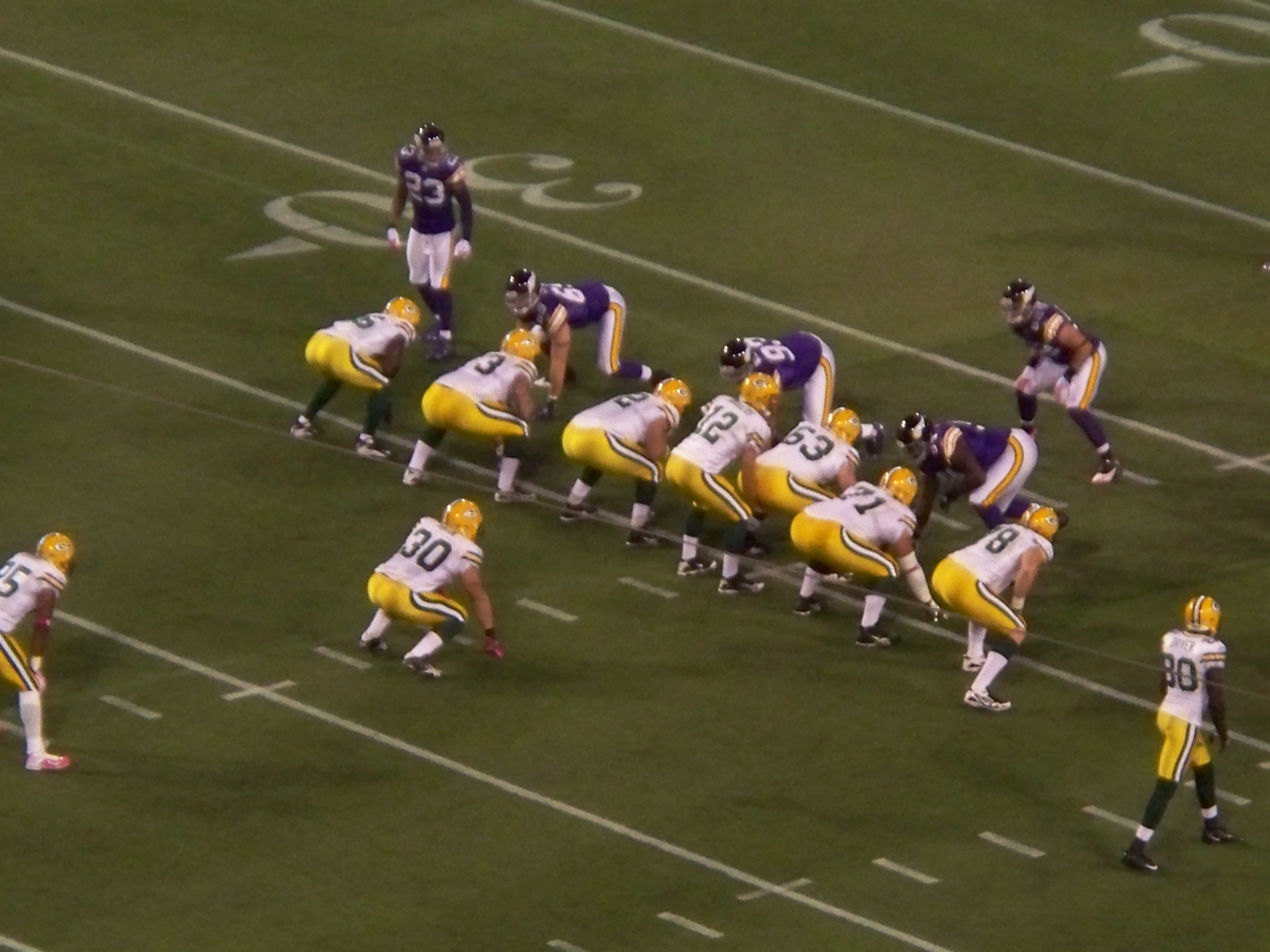
Minnesota Vikings versus Green Bay Packers in Week 4 of the 2009 NFL season.

Coming off their last-second win over the 49ers, the Vikings stayed at home, donned their throwback uniforms, and prepared for the highly anticipated Week 4 NFC North Monday Night Football duel with the Green Bay Packers. This was a key divisional match-up, as the division lead was on the line, while quarterback Brett Favre was pitted against his former team. Favre entered the stadium to a series of boos coming from Green Bay fans throughout the stadium.

Minnesota started off the first quarter with Favre completing a 1-yard touchdown pass to tight end Visanthe Shiancoe. The Packers responded with quarterback Aaron Rodgers completing a 62-yard touchdown pass to tight end Jermichael Finley. In the second quarter, the Vikings struck again with a 14-yard touchdown pass from Favre to wide receiver Sidney Rice, but Green Bay answered with linebacker Clay Matthews stripping running back Adrian Peterson of the ball and returning it 42 yards for a touchdown. The Vikings closed out the half with a 1-yard touchdown run from Peterson.

Minnesota began to build a lead in the third quarter as Favre hooked up with wide receiver Bernard Berrian on a 31-yard touchdown pass. In the fourth quarter, the Vikings solidified their lead as defensive end Jared Allen sacked Rodgers in the Green Bay endzone for a safety. The Packers rallied with a 33-yard touchdown pass from Rodgers to wide receiver Jordy Nelson (with a failed 2-point conversion), followed by kicker Mason Crosby nailing a 31-yard field goal. However, the Packers' push came too late and Minnesota was able to run out the clock for the win.

With the victory, not only did the Vikings improve to 4–0, but Favre became the first quarterback in NFL history to defeat all 32 NFL teams.

Allen had a spectacular single-game performance with a career-best 4.5 sacks. Favre was awarded the NFC Offensive Player of the Week, marking the 14th time in his career he has earned this award.

==== Week 5: at St. Louis Rams ====
Week 5: Minnesota Vikings at St. Louis Rams – Game summary

Quarter	1	2	3	4	Total
**Vikings**	14	3	7	14	**38**
Rams	0	3	0	7	**10**

at Edward Jones Dome, St. Louis, Missouri

- Date: October 11
- Game time: 12:00 p.m.
- Game weather: None (indoor stadium)
- Game attendance: 60,166
- Referee: Don Carey (126)
- TV announcers (Fox): Chris Myers and Charles Davis
- Recap, Game Book

Game information

**First quarter**

- MIN – Adrian Peterson 5-yard run (Ryan Longwell kick), 10:17. Vikings 7–0. **Drive: 9 plays, 80 yards, 4:43.**
- MIN – Jared Allen 52-yard fumble return (Ryan Longwell kick), 8:00. Vikings 14–0.

**Second quarter**

- STL – Josh Brown 29-yard field goal, 7:38. Vikings 14–3. **Drive: 7 plays, 14 yards, 1:59.**
- MIN – Ryan Longwell 47-yard field goal, 5:34. Vikings 17–3. **Drive: 5 plays, 27 yards, 2:04.**

**Third quarter**

- MIN – Visanthe Shiancoe 13-yard pass from Brett Favre (Ryan Longwell kick), 9:15. Vikings 24–3. **Drive: 7 plays, 90 yards, 3:44.**

**Fourth quarter**

- MIN – Adrian Peterson 7-yard run (Ryan Longwell kick), 10:01. Vikings 31–3. **Drive: 9 plays, 80 yards, 4:48.**
- STL – Donnie Avery 27-yard pass from Marc Bulger (Josh Brown kick), 6:45. Vikings 31–10. **Drive: 6 plays, 80 yards, 3:16.**
- MIN – Chester Taylor 1-yard run (Ryan Longwell kick), 1:55. Vikings 38–10. **Drive: 9 plays, 80 yards, 4:50.**

**Top passers**

- MIN – Brett Favre – 18/24, 232 yards, TD, INT
- STL – Kyle Boller – 20/31, 209 yards, INT

**Top rushers**

- MIN – Adrian Peterson – 14 rushes, 63 yards, 2 TD
- STL – Steven Jackson – 21 rushes, 84 yards

**Top receivers**

- MIN – Percy Harvin – 4 receptions, 66 yards
- STL – Donnie Avery – 5 receptions, 87 yards, TD

Coming off an impressive divisional home win over the Packers, the Vikings flew to the Edward Jones Dome for a Week 5 duel with the St. Louis Rams. Minnesota got off to a fast start in the first quarter as running back Adrian Peterson got a 5-yard touchdown run, followed by defensive end Jared Allen's 52-yard fumble return for a touchdown. The Rams got on the board with kicker Josh Brown making a 29-yard field goal, but the Vikings replied with kicker Ryan Longwell booting a 47-yard field goal.

Minnesota kept its dominating performance going in the third quarter as quarterback Brett Favre hooked up with tight end Visanthe Shiancoe on a 13-yard touchdown pass. In the fourth quarter, the Vikings continued to pull away as Peterson got a 7-yard touchdown run. St. Louis tried to rally with a 27-yard touchdown pass from quarterback Marc Bulger to wide receiver Donnie Avery, but Minnesota closed out the game with a 1-yard touchdown run from running back Chester Taylor.

With the win, not only did the Vikings make their first 5–0 start since 2003, but Favre earned his first 5–0 start in his career.

==== Week 6: vs. Baltimore Ravens ====
Week 6: Baltimore Ravens at Minnesota Vikings – Game summary

Quarter	1	2	3	4	Total
Ravens	0	3	7	21	**31**
**Vikings**	14	0	6	13	**33**

at Mall of America Field at Hubert H. Humphrey Metrodome, Minneapolis, Minnesota

- Date: October 18
- Game time: 12:00 p.m.
- Game weather: None (indoor stadium)
- Game attendance: 63,689
- Referee: Mike Carey (94)
- TV announcers (CBS): Greg Gumbel and Dan Dierdorf
- Recap, Game Book

Game information

**First quarter**

- MIN – Visanthe Shiancoe 19-yard pass from Brett Favre (Ryan Longwell kick), 11:25. Vikings 7–0. **Drive: 6 plays, 61 yards, 3:35.**
- MIN – Bernard Berrian 4-yard pass from Brett Favre (Ryan Longwell kick), 6:16. Vikings 14–0. **Drive: 7 plays, 55 yards, 3:21.**

**Second quarter**

- BAL – Steven Hauschka 29-yard field goal, 0:02. Vikings 14–3. **Drive: 9 plays, 71 yards, 1:45.**

**Third quarter**

- MIN – Ryan Longwell 40-yard field goal, 7:16. Vikings 17–3. **Drive: 10 plays, 38 yards, 5:35.**
- BAL – Ray Rice 22-yard run (Steven Hauschka kick), 4:13. Vikings 17–10. **Drive: 8 plays, 72 yards, 3:03.**
- MIN – Ryan Longwell 22-yard field goal, 2:05. Vikings 20–10. **Drive: 5 plays, 67 yards, 2:08.**

**Fourth quarter**

- MIN – Visanthe Shiancoe 1-yard pass from Brett Favre (Ryan Longwell kick), 10:08. Vikings 27–10. **Drive: 10 plays, 80 yards, 5:42.**
- BAL – Mark Clayton 32-yard pass from Joe Flacco (Steven Hauschka kick), 8:35. Vikings 27–17. **Drive: 7 plays, 75 yards, 1:33.**
- MIN – Ryan Longwell 29-yard field goal, 6:01. Vikings 30–17. **Drive: 5 plays, 61 yards, 2:34.**
- BAL – Derrick Mason 12-yard pass from Joe Flacco (Steven Hauschka kick), 5:12. Vikings 30–24. **Drive: 3 plays, 73 yards, 0:49.**
- BAL – Ray Rice 33-yard run (Steven Hauschka kick), 3:37. Ravens 31–30. **Drive: 1 play, 33 yards, 0:07.**
- MIN – Ryan Longwell 31-yard field goal, 1:56. Vikings 33–31. **Drive: 6 plays, 66 yards, 1:41.**

**Top passers**

- BAL – Joe Flacco – 28/43, 385 yards, 2 TD
- MIN – Brett Favre – 21/29, 278 yards, 3 TD

**Top rushers**

- BAL – Ray Rice – 10 rushes, 77 yards, 2 TD
- MIN – Adrian Peterson – 22 rushes, 143 yards

**Top receivers**

- BAL – Ray Rice – 10 receptions, 117 yards
- MIN – Sidney Rice – 6 receptions, 176 yards

Coming off their easy road win over the Rams, the Vikings went home for a Week 6 inter-conference duel with the Baltimore Ravens. Minnesota got off to a fast start in the first quarter with quarterback Brett Favre completing a 19-yard touchdown pass to tight end Visanthe Shiancoe and a 4-yard touchdown pass to wide receiver Bernard Berrian. Afterwards, the Ravens got the only points of the second quarter as kicker Steven Hauschka getting a 29-yard field goal.

In the third quarter, the Vikings picked up where they left off with a 40-yard field goal from kicker Ryan Longwell. Baltimore responded with a 22-yard touchdown run from running back Ray Rice, yet Longwell helped out Minnesota by nailing a 22-yard field goal. Afterwards, an action-packed fourth quarter ensued. Minnesota increased its lead with Favre hooking up with Shiancoe again on a 1-yard touchdown pass, but the Ravens continued to hang around as quarterback Joe Flacco found wide receiver Mark Clayton on a 32-yard touchdown pass. The Vikings replied with Longwell's 29-yard field goal, but Baltimore took lead for the first time in the game as Flacco hooked up with wide receiver Derrick Mason on a 12-yard touchdown pass and Rice running 33 yards for a touchdown. Minnesota then regained the lead as Longwell booted a 31-yard field goal after a 58-yard pass from quarterback Brett Favre to wide receiver Sidney Rice. The Ravens got a last-minute drive into scoring range, but Hauschka's 44-yard field goal attempt went wide left, preserving the Vikings' perfect season.

With the win, the Vikings acquired their first 6–0 start since 2003 (unfortunately that team did not make the playoffs). Also, dating back to Week 17 of the 2008 season, Minnesota has won seven-straight regular season games for the first time since 2000. The Vikings would not start 6–0 again until 2026.

==== Week 7: at Pittsburgh Steelers ====
Week 7: Minnesota Vikings at Pittsburgh Steelers – Game summary

Quarter	1	2	3	4	Total
Vikings	0	7	3	7	**17**
**Steelers**	3	7	3	14	**27**

at Heinz Field, Pittsburgh, Pennsylvania

- Date: October 25
- Game time: 12:00 p.m.
- Game weather: Sunny, 52 °F (11 °C)
- Game attendance: 65,597
- Referee: Ron Winter (14)
- TV announcers (Fox): Kenny Albert, Daryl Johnston and Tony Siragusa
- Recap, Game Book

Game information

**First quarter**

- PIT – Jeff Reed 39-yard field goal, 0:04. Steelers 3–0. **Drive: 8 plays, 18 yards, 4:22.**

**Second quarter**

- MIN – Adrian Peterson 2-yard run (Ryan Longwell kick), 5:12. Vikings 7–3. **Drive: 13 plays, 76 yards, 5:22.**
- PIT – Mike Wallace 40-yard pass from Ben Roethlisberger (Jeff Reed kick), 0:24. Steelers 10–7. **Drive: 8 plays, 91 yards, 1:15.**

**Third quarter**

- PIT – Jeff Reed 27-yard field goal, 11:05. Steelers 13–7. **Drive: 9 plays, 55 yards, 3:55.**
- MIN – Ryan Longwell 18-yard field goal, 4:44. Steelers 13–10. **Drive: 13 plays, 64 yards, 6:21.**

**Fourth quarter**

- PIT – LaMarr Woodley 77-yard fumble return (Jeff Reed kick), 6:23. Steelers 20–10.
- MIN – Percy Harvin 88-yard kickoff return (Ryan Longwell kick), 6:09. Steelers 20–17. **Drive: 0 plays, 0 yards, 0:14.**
- PIT – Keyaron Fox 82-yard interception return (Jeff Reed kick), 1:00. Steelers 27–17.

**Top passers**

- MIN – Brett Favre – 33/50, 334 yards, INT
- PIT – Ben Roethlisberger – 14/26, 175 yards, TD

**Top rushers**

- MIN – Adrian Peterson – 18 rushes, 69 yards, TD
- PIT – Rashard Mendenhall – 10 rushes, 69 yards

**Top receivers**

- MIN – Sidney Rice – 10 receptions, 136 yards
- PIT – Mike Wallace – 3 receptions, 72 yards, TD

Coming off their thrilling home win over the Ravens, the Vikings flew to Heinz Field for a Week 7 interconference duel with the defending Super Bowl champion Pittsburgh Steelers. Minnesota trailed late in the first quarter as Steelers kicker Jeff Reed got a 39-yard field goal, but they took the lead in the second quarter as running back Adrian Peterson got a 1-yard touchdown. However, Pittsburgh retook the lead as quarterback Ben Roethlisberger hooked up with wide receiver Mike Wallace on a 40-yard touchdown pass.

Both teams exchanged field goals in the third quarter as Reed nailed a 27-yard field goal, while Vikings kicker Ryan Longwell booted an 18-yard field goal. In the fourth quarter, Minnesota began to trail big as Vikings quarterback Brett Favre was stripped by defensive end Brett Keisel, causing a 77-yard fumble return for a touchdown by linebacker LaMarr Woodley. The Vikings immediately struck back with rookie wide receiver Percy Harvin's 88-yard kickoff return for a touchdown, but the Steelers' defense answered right back with linebacker Keyaron Fox's 82-yard interception return for a touchdown. The Vikings could not come back to win. The Steelers ended up winning 27–17.

With the loss, Minnesota fell to 6–1.

==== Week 8: at Green Bay Packers ====
Week 8: Minnesota Vikings at Green Bay Packers – Game summary

Quarter	1	2	3	4	Total
**Vikings**	7	10	7	14	**38**
Packers	3	0	17	6	**26**

at Lambeau Field, Green Bay, Wisconsin

- Date: November 1
- Game time: 3:15 p.m.
- Game weather: Mostly cloudy, 48 °F (9 °C)
- Game attendance: 71,213
- Referee: Tony Corrente (99)
- TV announcers (Fox): Thom Brennaman, Troy Aikman and Pam Oliver
- Recap, Game Book

Game information

**First quarter**

- GB – Mason Crosby 37-yard field goal, 5:05. Packers 3–0. **Drive: 4 plays, 2 yards, 1:58.**
- MIN – Adrian Peterson 1-yard run (Ryan Longwell kick), 1:17. Vikings 7–3. **Drive: 7 plays, 14 yards, 3:48.**

**Second quarter**

- MIN – Visanthe Shiancoe 12-yard pass from Brett Favre (Ryan Longwell kick), 10:42. Vikings 14–3. **Drive: 7 plays, 51 yards, 3:37.**
- MIN – Ryan Longwell 41-yard field goal, 0:09. Vikings 17–3. **Drive: 8 plays, 37 yards, 2:11.**

**Third quarter**

- MIN – Percy Harvin 51-yard pass from Brett Favre (Ryan Longwell kick), 13:08. Vikings 24–3. **Drive: 4 plays, 63 yards, 1:52.**
- GB – Mason Crosby 26-yard field goal, 8:28. Vikings 24–6. **Drive: 10 plays, 62 yards, 4:40.**
- GB – Spencer Havner 16-yard pass from Aaron Rodgers (Mason Crosby kick), 6:30. Vikings 24–13. **Drive: 5 plays, 41 yards, 1:53.**
- GB – Spencer Havner 5-yard pass from Aaron Rodgers (Mason Crosby kick), 1:57. Vikings 24–20. **Drive: 7 plays, 84 yards, 4:00.**

**Fourth quarter**

- MIN – Jeff Dugan 2-yard pass from Brett Favre (Ryan Longwell kick), 13:35. Vikings 31–20. **Drive: 7 plays, 38 yards, 3:22.**
- GB – Greg Jennings 10-yard pass from Aaron Rodgers (pass failed), 10:26. Vikings 31–26. **Drive: 7 plays, 74 yards, 3:09.**
- MIN – Bernard Berrian 16-yard pass from Brett Favre (Ryan Longwell kick), 3:48. Vikings 38–26. **Drive: 4 plays, 59 yards, 1:50.**

**Top passers**

- MIN – Brett Favre – 17/28, 244 yards, 4 TD
- GB – Aaron Rodgers – 26/41, 287 yards, 3 TD

**Top rushers**

- MIN – Adrian Peterson – 25 rushes, 97 yards, TD
- GB – Aaron Rodgers – 5 rushes, 52 yards

**Top receivers**

- MIN – Percy Harvin – 5 receptions, 84 yards, TD
- GB – Greg Jennings – 7 receptions, 81 yards, TD

Hoping to rebound from their first loss of the season to the Steelers, the Vikings flew to Lambeau Field for the highly anticipated Week 8 divisional rematch with the Green Bay Packers, as quarterback Brett Favre made his first return to Lambeau since initially retiring after the 2007 season.

In the first quarter, the Packers scored the game's first points as kicker Mason Crosby made a 37-yard field goal following a miscue by Vikings center John Sullivan (Favre audibled for another play but Sullivan snapped the ball before Favre completed his audible). Minnesota responded with a 1-yard touchdown from running back Adrian Peterson. In the second quarter, the Vikings added onto their lead as Favre completed a 12-yard touchdown pass to tight end Visanthe Shiancoe, followed by kicker Ryan Longwell (another former Packer) nailing a 41-yard field goal.

Minnesota picked up where they left off in the third quarter as Favre hooked up with rookie wide receiver Percy Harvin on a 51-yard touchdown pass, yet Green Bay started to rally as Crosby booted a 26-yard field goal, followed by quarterback Aaron Rodgers finding tight end Spencer Havner on a 16-yard and a 5-yard touchdown pass. The Vikings answered in the fourth quarter with Favre connecting with tight end/fullback Jeff Dugan on a 2-yard touchdown pass. The Packers tried to come back as Rodgers completed a 10-yard touchdown pass to wide receiver Greg Jennings (with a failed 2-point conversion), but Minnesota pulled away with Favre finding wide receiver Bernard Berrian on a 16-yard touchdown pass.

With their first season-sweep of the Packers in four years, the Vikings went into their bye week at 7–1, and took a commanding 2 1/2-game lead in the NFC North over the second-place Packers. Favre threw at least 4 touchdowns for the 21st time in his career, matching the NFL record held by Dan Marino. This also marks Vikings head coach Brad Childress' first win at Green Bay (he is 3–5 overall against the Packers) and the Vikings' first sweep of the Packers since 2005.

==== Week 9: Bye week ====
During the Vikings' bye week, both Green Bay and Chicago lost their games (to Tampa Bay 38–28 and Arizona 41–21 respectively), allowing the Vikings to gain a three-game lead in the division standings and moving them a step closer to qualification for the playoffs and first round bye.

==== Week 10: vs. Detroit Lions ====
Week 10: Detroit Lions at Minnesota Vikings – Game summary

Quarter	1	2	3	4	Total
Lions	0	3	7	0	**10**
**Vikings**	3	7	7	10	**27**

at Mall of America Field at Hubert H. Humphrey Metrodome, Minneapolis, Minnesota

- Date: November 15
- Game time: 12:00 p.m.
- Game weather: None (indoor stadium)
- Game attendance: 63,854
- Referee: Walt Anderson (66)
- TV announcers (Fox): Sam Rosen, Tim Ryan and Chris Myers
- Recap, Game Book

Game information

**First quarter**

- MIN – Ryan Longwell 22-yard field goal, 9:18. Vikings 3–0. **Drive: 10 plays, 66 yards, 5:42.**

**Second quarter**

- MIN – Adrian Peterson 22-yard run (Ryan Longwell kick), 10:48. Vikings 10–0. **Drive: 4 plays, 67 yards, 1:15.**
- DET – Jason Hanson 38-yard field goal, 0:04. Vikings 10–3. **Drive: 11 plays, 60 yards, 2:00.**

**Third quarter**

- MIN – Adrian Peterson 1-yard run (Ryan Longwell kick), 14:18. Vikings 17–3. **Drive: 2 plays, 28 yards, 0:22.**
- DET – Will Heller 8-yard pass from Matthew Stafford (Jason Hanson kick), 8:14. Vikings 17–10. **Drive: 15 plays, 84 yards, 6:04.**

**Fourth quarter**

- MIN – Jeff Dugan 8-yard pass from Brett Favre (Ryan Longwell kick), 13:20. Vikings 24–10. **Drive: 4 plays, 61 yards, 2:03.**
- MIN – Ryan Longwell 35-yard field goal, 7:33. Vikings 27–10. **Drive: 8 plays, 71 yards, 4:11.**

**Top passers**

- DET – Matthew Stafford – 29/51, 224 yards, TD
- MIN – Brett Favre – 20/29, 344 yards, TD

**Top rushers**

- DET – Kevin Smith – 12 rushes, 55 yards
- MIN – Adrian Peterson – 18 rushes, 133 yards, 2 TD

**Top receivers**

- DET – Calvin Johnson – 8 receptions, 84 yards
- MIN – Sidney Rice – 7 receptions, 201 yards

Coming off their bye week, the Vikings were at home and met in an NFC North duel with the Detroit Lions, who hadn't won in the Metrodome since 1997. In the first quarter, the Vikings scored the period's only points as kicker Ryan Longwell nailed a 22-yard field goal. They increased their lead in the second quarter as running back Adrian Peterson scored on a 22-yard touchdown run. However, Lions kicker Jason Hanson kicked a 38-yard field goal late in the quarter. At the beginning of the second half, a fumble by the Lions on their first play from scrimmage was recovered at their 29-yard line by the Vikings. Peterson ran twice on the ensuing drive, scoring on a 1-yard touchdown run to make it a 17–3 lead. The Lions responded with a 15-play, 84-yard drive, capped off by an 8-yard touchdown pass from Matthew Stafford to tight end Will Heller. Nevertheless, the Vikings pulled away in the fourth quarter as Favre completed an 8-yard pass to tight end Jeff Dugan and kicker Ryan Longwell nailed a 35-yard field goal.

With the win, the Vikings moved to 8–1, and compiled a 4–0 record against their NFC North rivals. The Vikings accrued nearly 500 yards of total offense, including 303 yards in the first half alone. The Vikings also had 13 penalties, a season-high. Wide receiver Sidney Rice had a big day, catching seven passes for 201 yards, including a 56-yard reception in the opening seconds of the fourth quarter. Rice was named NFC Offensive Player of the Week for Week 10, the first time he has received this award. Favre and Peterson were voted FedEx Air and Ground Players of the Week.

==== Week 11: vs. Seattle Seahawks ====
Week 11: Seattle Seahawks at Minnesota Vikings – Game summary

Quarter	1	2	3	4	Total
Seahawks	0	0	3	6	**9**
**Vikings**	0	21	7	7	**35**

at Mall of America Field at Hubert H. Humphrey Metrodome, Minneapolis, Minnesota

- Date: November 22
- Game time: 12:00 p.m.
- Game weather: None (indoor stadium)
- Game attendance: 63,854
- Referee: Ed Hochuli (85)
- TV announcers (Fox): Dick Stockton and Charles Davis
- Recap, Game Book

Game information

**First quarter**

- No scoring plays.

**Second quarter**

- MIN – Percy Harvin 23-yard pass from Brett Favre (Ryan Longwell kick), 10:05. Vikings 7–0. **Drive: 10 plays, 84 yards, 5:01.**
- MIN – Visanthe Shiancoe 8-yard pass from Brett Favre (Ryan Longwell kick), 4:57. Vikings 14–0. **Drive: 6 plays, 70 yards, 2:32.**
- MIN – Bernard Berrian 3-yard pass from Brett Favre (Ryan Longwell kick), 1:12. Vikings 21–0. **Drive: 6 plays, 34 yards, 3:34.**

**Third quarter**

- MIN – Sidney Rice 7-yard pass from Brett Favre (Ryan Longwell kick), 4:08. Vikings 28–0. **Drive: 12 plays, 89 yards, 6:37.**
- SEA – Olindo Mare 40-yard field goal, 0:43. Vikings 28–3. **Drive: 7 plays, 47 yards, 3:25.**

**Fourth quarter**

- MIN – Sidney Rice 34-yard pass from Tarvaris Jackson (Ryan Longwell kick), 10:21. Vikings 35–3. **Drive: 10 plays, 80 yards, 5:22.**
- SEA – Justin Forsett 1-yard run (pass failed), 8:05. Vikings 35–9. **Drive: 6 plays, 78 yards, 2:16.**

**Top passers**

- SEA – Matt Hasselbeck – 19/26, 231 yards, INT
- MIN – Brett Favre – 22/25, 213 yards, 4 TD

**Top rushers**

- SEA – Justin Forsett – 8 rushes, 9 yards, TD
- MIN – Adrian Peterson – 24 rushes, 82 yards

**Top receivers**

- SEA – Nate Burleson – 6 receptions, 100 yards
- MIN – Sidney Rice – 6 receptions, 89 yards, 2 TD

Coming off their penalty-plagued blowout win over the Lions, the Vikings stayed at home and met in a Week 11 duel with the Seattle Seahawks. After a scoreless first quarter, the Vikings got on the board with quarterback Brett Favre completing a 23-yard touchdown pass to wide receiver Percy Harvin. Later in the same quarter, the Vikings increased their lead with an 8-yard touchdown pass from Favre to tight end Visanthe Shiancoe. Closing out the first half was a 3-yard touchdown pass from Favre to wide receiver Bernard Berrian to make a 21–0 Vikings halftime lead, the first time of the season the Vikings kept their opponent scoreless in the first half. In the third quarter, the Vikings continued to dominate as Favre found wide receiver Sidney Rice on a 7-yard touchdown pass. Seattle scored their first points of the game when kicker Olindo Mare nailed a 40-yard field goal. Finally, the Vikings put the game away as second-string quarterback Tarvaris Jackson found Rice again on a 34-yard touchdown pass. The Seahawks tried to rally with a 1-yard touchdown run by running back Justin Forsett (with a failed two-point conversion), but the Vikings prevented the Seahawks comeback from advancing any further.

With the win, the Vikings improved to 9–1. Brett Favre threw four touchdown passes for the 22nd time in his career (second of the season), breaking the mark set by Dan Marino.

==== Week 12: vs. Chicago Bears ====
Week 12: Chicago Bears at Minnesota Vikings – Game summary

Quarter	1	2	3	4	Total
Bears	0	7	3	0	**10**
**Vikings**	0	24	3	9	**36**

at Mall of America Field at Hubert H. Humphrey Metrodome, Minneapolis, Minnesota

- Date: November 29
- Game time: 3:15 p.m.
- Game weather: None (indoor stadium)
- Game attendance: 63,854
- Referee: Walt Coleman (65)
- TV announcers (Fox): Joe Buck, Troy Aikman and Pam Oliver
- Recap, Game Book

Game information

**First quarter**

- No scoring plays.

**Second quarter**

- MIN – Percy Harvin 15-yard pass from Brett Favre (Ryan Longwell kick), 14:56. Vikings 7–0. **Drive: 13 plays, 96 yards, 6:52.**
- CHI – Johnny Knox 24-yard pass from Jay Cutler (Robbie Gould kick), 12:12. Tied 7–7. **Drive: 6 plays, 54 yards, 2:44.**
- MIN – Chester Taylor 10-yard pass from Brett Favre (Ryan Longwell kick), 8:06. Vikings 14–7. **Drive: 8 plays, 80 yards, 4:06.**
- MIN – Ryan Longwell 52-yard field goal, 7:02. Vikings 17–7. **Drive: 4 plays, −3 yards, 0:57.**
- MIN – Visanthe Shiancoe 6-yard pass from Brett Favre (Ryan Longwell kick), 0:17. Vikings 24–7. **Drive: 7 plays, 70 yards, 0:40.**

**Third quarter**

- CHI – Robbie Gould 38-yard field goal, 12:44. Vikings 24–10. **Drive: 4 plays, −12 yards, 2:16.**
- MIN – Ryan Longwell 37-yard field goal, 7:45. Vikings 27–10. **Drive: 12 plays, 48 yards, 4:59.**

**Fourth quarter**

- MIN – Ryan Longwell 20-yard field goal, 13:36. Vikings 30–10. **Drive: 13 plays, 71 yards, 7:36.**
- MIN – Adrian Peterson 5-yard run (run failed), 6:35. Vikings 36–10. **Drive: 8 plays, 68 yards, 5:09.**

**Top passers**

- CHI – Jay Cutler – 18/23, 147 yards, TD, 2 INT
- MIN – Brett Favre – 32/48, 392 yards, 3 TD

**Top rushers**

- CHI – Matt Forté – 8 rushes, 27 yards
- MIN – Adrian Peterson – 25 rushes, 85 yards, TD

**Top receivers**

- CHI – Greg Olsen – 7 receptions, 45 yards
- MIN – Percy Harvin – 6 receptions, 101 yards, TD

Coming off their easy win over the Seahawks, the Vikings stayed at home, donned their throwback uniforms, and faced the Chicago Bears in a Week 12 duel. After a scoreless first quarter, the Vikings drew first blood as quarterback Brett Favre completed a 15-yard touchdown pass to rookie wide receiver Percy Harvin. The Bears responded with quarterback Jay Cutler firing a 24-yard touchdown pass to wide receiver Johnny Knox. The Vikings responded with Favre hooking up with running back Chester Taylor on a 10-yard touchdown pass, along with kicker Ryan Longwell nailing a 52-yard field goal. Finally, the Vikings closed out the first half with Favre finding tight end Visanthe Shiancoe on a 6-yard touchdown pass. In the third quarter, the Bears tried to rally with kicker Robbie Gould nailing a 38-yard field goal. However, the Vikings finally shut out the Bears for the rest of the second half, and kicker Ryan Longwell made field goals of 37 and 20 yards. Running back Adrian Peterson also had a 5-yard touchdown run, though the extra point attempt was missed.

With the win, the Vikings improved to 10–1, and compiled a 5–0 record against their NFC North rivals. Their magic number decreased to two, meaning that any combination of two Vikings wins or Packers losses would result in the Vikings clinching their second consecutive NFC North division title. On Wednesday, December 2, Brett Favre was named the NFC Offensive Player of the Month for November; it was the sixth time in his career that he won the award.

==== Week 13: at Arizona Cardinals ====
Week 13: Minnesota Vikings at Arizona Cardinals – Game summary

Quarter	1	2	3	4	Total
Vikings	7	3	0	7	**17**
**Cardinals**	7	14	6	3	**30**

at University of Phoenix Stadium, Glendale, Arizona

- Date: December 6
- Game time: 7:20 p.m.
- Game weather: None (indoor stadium)
- Game attendance: 64,121
- Referee: John Parry (132)
- TV announcers (NBC): Al Michaels, Cris Collinsworth and Andrea Kremer
- Recap, Game Book

Game information

**First quarter**

- MIN – Visanthe Shiancoe 3-yard pass from Brett Favre (Ryan Longwell kick), 9:47. Vikings 7–0. **Drive: 10 plays, 47 yards, 4:25.**
- ARI – Anquan Boldin 2-yard pass from Kurt Warner (Neil Rackers kick), 4:49. Tied 7–7. **Drive: 1 play, 2 yards, 0:03.**

**Second quarter**

- ARI – Anquan Boldin 39-yard pass from Kurt Warner (Neil Rackers kick), 7:42. Cardinals 14–7. **Drive: 2 plays, 58 yards, 0:52.**
- MIN – Ryan Longwell 25-yard field goal, 1:55. Cardinals 14–10. **Drive: 10 plays, 62 yards, 5:47.**
- ARI – Larry Fitzgerald 34-yard pass from Kurt Warner (Neil Rackers kick), 1:14. Cardinals 21–10. **Drive: 5 plays, 77 yards, 0:41.**

**Third quarter**

- ARI – Neil Rackers 31-yard field goal, 7:45. Cardinals 24–10. **Drive: 10 plays, 46 yards, 4:34.**
- ARI – Neil Rackers 30-yard field goal, 3:19. Cardinals 27–10. **Drive: 5 plays, 32 yards, 1:51.**

**Fourth quarter**

- ARI – Neil Rackers 29-yard field goal, 4:18. Cardinals 30–10. **Drive: 10 plays, 69 yards, 5:34.**
- MIN – Percy Harvin 31-yard pass from Brett Favre (Ryan Longwell kick), 1:20. Cardinals 30–17. **Drive: 9 plays, 84 yards, 2:58.**

**Top passers**

- MIN – Brett Favre – 30/45, 275 yards, 2 TD, 2 INT
- ARI – Kurt Warner – 22/32, 285 yards, 3 TD

**Top rushers**

- MIN – Percy Harvin – 2 rushes, 22 yards
- ARI – Tim Hightower – 6 rushes, 50 yards

**Top receivers**

- MIN – Percy Harvin – 6 receptions, 79 yards, TD
- ARI – Larry Fitzgerald – 8 receptions, 143 yards, TD

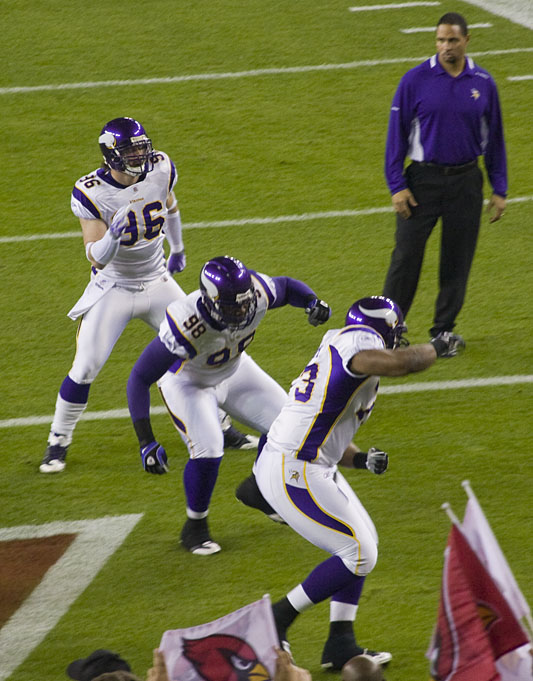
Brian Robison, Letroy Guion and Jimmy Kennedy in week 13

Coming off their easy home win over the Bears, the Vikings flew to the desert for a Week 13 Sunday Night duel with the defending NFC champion Arizona Cardinals. In the first quarter, Minnesota got on the board with quarterback Brett Favre completing a 3-yard touchdown pass to tight end Visanthe Shiancoe. It was originally ruled an incomplete pass as Shiancoe was deemed to have stepped out of bounds, but Minnesota challenged and won based on the fact that Shiancoe had both feet inbounds and the referee counted Shiancoe's third step, thereby making the original ruling on the field to be overturned. The Cardinals then responded with quarterback Kurt Warner finding wide receiver Anquan Boldin on a 2-yard touchdown pass.

In the second quarter, Arizona took the lead with Warner finding Boldin again on a 39-yard touchdown pass. The Vikings responded with kicker Ryan Longwell nailing a 25-yard field goal. However, the Cardinals took the lead at halftime when Warner completed a 34-yard touchdown pass to wide receiver Larry Fitzgerald. In the third quarter, Arizona increased their lead when kicker Neil Rackers kicked field goals of 31 and 30 yards. In the fourth quarter, Arizona kicker Neil Rackers nailed a 29-yard field goal. However, the Vikings tried to rally with Favre hooking up with rookie wide receiver Percy Harvin on a 31-yard touchdown pass. The Vikings tried an onside kick, which they did not recover and Arizona ran out the clock to seal their win.

With only their second loss of the season, the Vikings not only fell to 10–2, but they lost starting linebacker E. J. Henderson to a season-ending broken leg.

==== Week 14: vs. Cincinnati Bengals ====
Week 14: Cincinnati Bengals at Minnesota Vikings – Game summary

Quarter	1	2	3	4	Total
Bengals	0	7	0	3	**10**
**Vikings**	0	16	7	7	**30**

at Mall of America Field at Hubert H. Humphrey Metrodome, Minneapolis, Minnesota

- Date: December 13
- Game time: 12:00 p.m.
- Game weather: None (indoor stadium)
- Game attendance: 63,854
- Referee: Scott Green (19)
- TV announcers (CBS): Greg Gumbel and Dan Dierdorf
- Recap, Game Book

Game information

**First quarter**

- No scoring plays.

**Second quarter**

- MIN – Ryan Longwell 41-yard field goal, 14:28. Vikings 3–0. **Drive: 9 plays, 39 yards, 4:22.**
- MIN – Sidney Rice 9-yard pass from Brett Favre (Ryan Longwell kick), 8:45. Vikings 10–0. **Drive: 7 plays, 43 yards, 2:46.**
- CIN – Chad Ochocinco 15-yard pass from Carson Palmer (Shayne Graham kick), 3:56. Vikings 10–7. **Drive: 10 plays, 82 yards, 4:49.**
- MIN – Ryan Longwell 23-yard field goal, 0:35. Vikings 13–7. **Drive: 14 plays, 71 yards, 3:21.**
- MIN – Ryan Longwell 44-yard field goal, 0:00. Vikings 16–7. **Drive: 1 play, 0 yards, 0:04.**

**Third quarter**

- MIN – Adrian Peterson 1-yard run (Ryan Longwell kick), 8:40. Vikings 23–7. **Drive: 10 plays, 60 yards, 6:20.**

**Fourth quarter**

- CIN – Shayne Graham 22-yard field goal, 12:43. Vikings 23–10. **Drive: 11 plays, 75 yards, 6:00.**
- MIN – Adrian Peterson 3-yard run (Ryan Longwell kick), 3:24. Vikings 30–10. **Drive: 11 plays, 67 yards, 6:15.**

**Top passers**

- CIN – Carson Palmer – 15/25, 94 yards, TD
- MIN – Brett Favre – 17/30, 192 yards, TD, INT

**Top rushers**

- CIN – Cedric Benson – 16 rushes, 96 yards
- MIN – Adrian Peterson – 26 rushes, 97 yards, 2 TD

**Top receivers**

- CIN – Chad Ochocinco – 3 receptions, 27 yards, TD
- MIN – Bernard Berrian – 4 receptions, 43 yards

Hoping to rebound from their devastating Sunday Night loss to the Cardinals, the Vikings went home and met the Cincinnati Bengals in a Week 14 duel. After a scoreless first quarter, Minnesota took first blood as kicker Ryan Longwell nailed a 41-yard field goal. They increased their lead later in the quarter with quarterback Brett Favre finding wide receiver Sidney Rice on a 9-yard touchdown pass. Cincinnati responded with quarterback Carson Palmer finding wide receiver Chad Ochocinco on a 15-yard touchdown pass, however the Vikings quickly scored two field goals by kicker Ryan Longwell (from 23 and 44 yards out) to put the Vikings up 16–7 at halftime. In the third quarter, the Vikings scored the period's only points as running back Adrian Peterson got a 1-yard touchdown run. In the fourth quarter, Cincinnati tried to rally with kicker Shayne Graham nailing a 22-yard field goal, but the Vikings put the game away with running back Adrian Peterson's 3-yard touchdown run.

With the win, the Vikings not only improved to 11–2 on the season, they also secured a playoff berth for the second consecutive season and improved upon the record from the previous season (10–6). Their "magic number" decreased to one, meaning that either a Green Bay loss at Pittsburgh or a Vikings win against Carolina on Sunday night would make Minnesota repeat division champions for the first time since 1978, when they won six consecutive NFC Central titles. Also, if the Eagles lost against San Francisco, the Vikings would also clinch a first-round bye in the NFC playoffs.

==== Week 15: at Carolina Panthers ====
Week 15: Minnesota Vikings at Carolina Panthers – Game summary

Quarter	1	2	3	4	Total
Vikings	0	7	0	0	**7**
**Panthers**	0	6	0	20	**26**

at Bank of America Stadium, Charlotte, North Carolina

- Date: December 20
- Game time: 7:20 p.m.
- Game weather: Partly cloudy, 37 °F (3 °C)
- Game attendance: 73,515
- Referee: Pete Morelli (135)
- TV announcers (NBC): Al Michaels and Cris Collinsworth
- Recap, Game Book

Game information

**First quarter**

- No scoring plays.

**Second quarter**

- CAR – Brad Hoover 1-yard pass from Matt Moore (kick blocked), 10:55. Panthers 6–0. **Drive: 15 plays, 71 yards, 8:01.**
- MIN – Adrian Peterson 4-yard run (Ryan Longwell kick), 5:01. Vikings 7–6. **Drive: 6 plays, 41 yards, 3:01.**

**Third quarter**

- No scoring plays.

**Fourth quarter**

- CAR – Steve Smith 42-yard pass from Matt Moore (pass failed), 14:49. Panthers 12–7. **Drive: 7 plays, 49 yards, 2:34.**
- CAR – Jonathan Stewart 3-yard run (John Kasay kick), 9:18. Panthers 19–7. **Drive: 6 plays, 77 yards, 3:00.**
- CAR – Jonathan Stewart 2-yard pass from Matt Moore (John Kasay kick), 3:07. Panthers 26–7. **Drive: 8 plays, 80 yards, 5:01.**

**Top passers**

- MIN – Brett Favre – 17/27, 224 yards, INT
- CAR – Matt Moore – 21/33, 299 yards, 3 TD

**Top rushers**

- MIN – Adrian Peterson – 12 rushes, 35 yards, TD
- CAR – Jonathan Stewart – 25 rushes, 109 yards, TD

**Top receivers**

- MIN – Adrian Peterson – 3 receptions, 73 yards
- CAR – Steve Smith – 9 receptions, 157 yards, TD

Coming off their home win over the Bengals, the Vikings flew to Bank of America Stadium to face the Carolina Panthers in a Week 15 Sunday Night duel. The Vikings clinched the NFC North about an hour before the game thanks in part to Pittsburgh's 37–36 last-second win over the Packers. With a win, the Vikings would be one game behind New Orleans to clinch homefield advantage. After a scoreless first quarter, Carolina got on the board with quarterback Matt Moore finding fullback Brad Hoover on a 1-yard touchdown pass. The extra point attempt was blocked, however. The Vikings then took the lead later in the quarter with running back Adrian Peterson's 4-yard touchdown run. After yet another scoreless quarter, it was all Carolina as Matt Moore completed a 42-yard touchdown pass to wide receiver Steve Smith, as well as running back Jonathan Stewart running in a 3-yard touchdown, as well as catching a 2-yard touchdown pass from Moore.

With the loss, the Vikings fell to 11–3. Reports surfaced after the game suggesting that there was tension between Vikings quarterback Brett Favre and head coach Brad Childress. The incident was later resolved.

==== Week 16: at Chicago Bears ====
Week 16: Minnesota Vikings at Chicago Bears – Game summary

Quarter	1	2	3	4	OT	Total
Vikings	0	0	13	17	0	**30**
**Bears**	3	13	7	7	6	**36**

at Soldier Field, Chicago, Illinois

- Date: December 28
- Game time: 7:30 p.m.
- Game weather: Partly cloudy, 26 °F (−3 °C)
- Game attendance: 62,479
- Referee: Gene Steratore (114)
- TV announcers (ESPN): Mike Tirico, Ron Jaworski and Jon Gruden
- Recap, Game Book

Game information

**First quarter**

- CHI – Robbie Gould 22-yard field goal, 7:24. Bears 3–0. **Drive: 9 plays, 56 yards, 4:35.**

**Second quarter**

- CHI – Robbie Gould 42-yard field goal, 13:23. Bears 6–0. **Drive: 9 plays, 36 yards, 3:54.**
- CHI – Greg Olsen 7-yard pass from Jay Cutler (Robbie Gould kick), 5:56. Bears 13–0. **Drive: 7 plays, 66 yards, 3:12.**
- CHI – Robbie Gould 41-yard field goal, 0:00. Bears 16–0. **Drive: 8 plays, 59 yards, 1:48.**

**Third quarter**

- MIN – Adrian Peterson 1-yard run (kick blocked), 8:17. Bears 16–6. **Drive: 4 plays, 80 yards, 1:47.**
- CHI – Desmond Clark 2-yard pass from Jay Cutler (Robbie Gould kick), 6:30. Bears 23–6. **Drive: 4 plays, 34 yards, 1:47.**
- MIN – Visanthe Shiancoe 6-yard pass from Brett Favre (Ryan Longwell kick), 1:18. Bears 23–13. **Drive: 10 plays, 73 yards, 5:12.**

**Fourth quarter**

- MIN – Ryan Longwell 41-yard field goal, 12:10. Bears 23–16. **Drive: 7 plays, 30 yards, 2:53.**
- MIN – Adrian Peterson 1-yard run (Ryan Longwell kick), 5:49. Tied 23–23. **Drive: 8 plays, 79 yards, 4:06.**
- CHI – Earl Bennett 20-yard pass from Jay Cutler (Robbie Gould kick), 4:55. Bears 30–23. **Drive: 2 plays, 21 yards, 0:54.**
- MIN – Sidney Rice 6-yard pass from Brett Favre (Ryan Longwell kick), 0:16. Tied 30–30. **Drive: 14 plays, 68 yards, 4:39.**

**Overtime**

- CHI – Devin Aromashodu 39-yard pass from Jay Cutler, 9:15. Bears 36–30. **Drive: 1 play, 39 yards, 0:06.**

**Top passers**

- MIN – Brett Favre – 26/40, 321 yards, 2 TD
- CHI – Jay Cutler – 20/35, 273 yards, 4 TD, INT

**Top rushers**

- MIN – Adrian Peterson – 24 rushes, 94 yards, 2 TD
- CHI – Matt Forté – 21 rushes, 74 yards

**Top receivers**

- MIN – Bernard Berrian – 3 receptions, 58 yards
- CHI – Devin Aromashodu – 7 receptions, 150 yards, TD

Hoping to rebound from their fourth-quarter collapse to the Panthers, the Vikings flew to Soldier Field to face Jay Cutler and the Chicago Bears in a Week 16 rematch to conclude the 40th season of Monday Night Football. Due to the Saints losing to Tampa Bay 20–17 in overtime the previous day, the Vikings needed to win their last two games and have the Saints lose to Carolina the next week in order to clinch homefield advantage. In the first quarter, the Bears drew first blood as kicker Robbie Gould nailed a 22-yard field goal for the only score of the period. In the second quarter, the Bears increased their lead with Gould nailing a 42-yard field goal. They increased their lead with Cutler firing a 7-yard touchdown pass to tight end Greg Olsen. The Bears then closed out the first half with Gould's 41-yard field goal.

In the third quarter, the Vikes started to rally with running back Adrian Peterson's 1-yard touchdown run (with the extra point attempt blocked). The Bears increased their lead over the Vikings with Cutler's 2-yard touchdown pass to tight end Desmond Clark. The Vikings then closed out the quarter with quarterback Brett Favre firing a 6-yard touchdown pass to tight end Visanthe Shiancoe. An exciting fourth quarter ensued. The Vikings started out the quarter's scoring with kicker Ryan Longwell's 41-yard field goal, along with Adrian Peterson's second 1-yard touchdown run. The Bears then responded with Cutler firing a 20-yard touchdown pass to wide receiver Earl Bennett. The Vikings then completed the remarkable comeback with Favre finding wide receiver Sidney Rice on a 6-yard touchdown pass on 4th-and-goal with 15 seconds left in regulation. The Bears then took a knee to force overtime. In overtime, the Bears won the toss and marched down the field, stopping at the 35-yard line. However, the potential game-winning 45-yard field goal attempt by Gould went wide right, giving the Vikings a chance to win. After an exchange of punts, the Vikings had the ball at the 26-yard line with 11 minutes left in the period. On the first play of scrimmage, Favre fired a screen pass to Peterson who caught it and went 16 yards, before being confronted by Hunter Hillenmeyer, who caused Peterson to fumble the ball, which was then recovered by Bears' linebacker Nick Roach. The Bears then won on Jay Cutler's game-winning 39-yard touchdown pass to wide receiver Devin Aromashodu.

With the loss, not only did the Vikings fall to 11–4, they also surrendered homefield advantage to the Saints.

==== Week 17: vs. New York Giants ====
Week 17: New York Giants at Minnesota Vikings – Game summary

Quarter	1	2	3	4	Total
Giants	0	0	0	7	**7**
**Vikings**	7	24	13	0	**44**

at Mall of America Field at Hubert H. Humphrey Metrodome, Minneapolis, Minnesota

- Date: January 3
- Game time: 12:00 p.m.
- Game weather: None (indoor stadium)
- Game attendance: 63,854
- Referee: Terry McAulay (77)
- TV announcers (Fox): Kenny Albert, Daryl Johnston and Tony Siragusa
- Recap, Game Book

Game information

**First quarter**

- MIN – Visanthe Shiancoe 10-yard pass from Brett Favre (Ryan Longwell kick), 12:57. Vikings 7–0. **Drive: 5 plays, 60 yards, 2:03.**

**Second quarter**

- MIN – Ryan Longwell 36-yard field goal, 14:46. Vikings 10–0. **Drive: 9 plays, 49 yards, 4:52.**
- MIN – Adrian Peterson 1-yard run (Ryan Longwell kick), 8:52. Vikings 17–0. **Drive: 6 plays, 91 yards, 3:51.**
- MIN – Sidney Rice 4-yard pass from Brett Favre (Ryan Longwell kick), 2:39. Vikings 24–0. **Drive: 7 plays, 59 yards, 3:43.**
- MIN – Sidney Rice 12-yard pass from Brett Favre (Ryan Longwell kick), 0:07. Vikings 31–0. **Drive: 8 plays, 40 yards, 2:17.**

**Third quarter**

- MIN – Ryan Longwell 24-yard field goal, 8:05. Vikings 34–0. **Drive: 9 plays, 67 yards, 5:19.**
- MIN – Naufahu Tahi 1-yard pass from Brett Favre (Ryan Longwell kick), 6:13. Vikings 41–0. **Drive: 4 plays, 8 yards, 1:38.**
- MIN – Ryan Longwell 27-yard field goal, 0:10. Vikings 44–0. **Drive: 8 plays, 32 yards, 4:29.**

**Fourth quarter**

- NYG – DJ Ware 1-yard run (Lawrence Tynes kick), 9:11. Vikings 44–7. **Drive: 11 plays, 77 yards, 5:59.**

**Top passers**

- NYG – Eli Manning – 17/23, 141 yards, INT
- MIN – Brett Favre – 25/31, 316 yards, 4 TD

**Top rushers**

- NYG – DJ Ware – 5 rushes, 22 yards, TD
- MIN – Adrian Peterson – 9 rushes, 54 yards, TD

**Top receivers**

- NYG – Steve Smith – 10 receptions, 57 yards
- MIN – Sidney Rice – 6 receptions, 112 yards, 2 TD

Hoping to break a two-game primetime losing skid, the Vikings went home to Mall of America Field for the Week 17 season finale against the New York Giants. The Vikings needed a win and an Eagles loss to Dallas later in the day in order to clinch a first-round bye in the playoffs. They also came into the game hoping to go 8–0 at home for the first time since the 15–1 season of 1998. The Vikings drew first blood in the first quarter with quarterback Brett Favre finding tight end Visanthe Shiancoe (a former Giant) on a 10-yard touchdown pass for the only score of the period. In the second quarter, the Vikings increased their lead with kicker Ryan Longwell's 41-yard field goal. Later in the quarter, it was all touchdowns as Adrian Peterson scored from one yard out, as well as Favre firing two touchdown passes to wide receiver Sidney Rice from 4 and 12 yards out. The 31–0 halftime lead was the second time of the season that the Vikes shut out their opponent in the first half, as well as tying a franchise record for the largest halftime lead. In the third quarter, the Vikings continued to destroy the Giants with Favre's 1-yard touchdown pass to fullback Naufahu Tahi on 4th-and-goal, along with kicker Ryan Longwell's field goals of 24 and 27 yards. The Giants only mustered a 1-yard touchdown run in the fourth quarter by running back Danny Ware.

With the win, the Vikings improved to 12–4, the franchise's best record since the 15–1 1998 campaign. With Dallas beating Philadelphia 24–0 later in the day, the Vikings clinched a first-round bye. Brett Favre threw at least four touchdown passes for the third time this season, as well as being honored with his third NFC Offensive Player of the Week award. The three awards are the most he has received in one season in his 19-year NFL career.

=== Standings ===
NFC North
	W	L	T	PCT	DIV	CONF	PF	PA	STK
^{(2)} Minnesota Vikings	12	4	0	.750	5–1	9–3	470	312	W1
^{(5)} Green Bay Packers	11	5	0	.688	4–2	9–3	461	297	W2
Chicago Bears	7	9	0	.438	3–3	5–7	327	375	W2
Detroit Lions	2	14	0	.125	0–6	1–11	262	494	L6

== Postseason ==
=== Schedule ===
Playoff round	Date	Opponent	Result	Record	Venue	NFL.com recap
WC	First-round bye					
DIV	January 17	Dallas Cowboys (3)	W 34–3	1–0	Mall of America Field	Recap
CONF	January 24	at New Orleans Saints (1)	L 28–31 (OT)	1–1	Louisiana Superdome	Recap

=== Game summaries ===
==== NFC Wildcard Round: Bye week ====
As the NFC second-seed, the Minnesota Vikings received a bye to the Divisional Round.

==== NFC Divisional Round: vs. Dallas Cowboys ====
NFC Divisional Round: Dallas Cowboys at Minnesota Vikings – Game summary

Quarter	1	2	3	4	Total
Cowboys	0	3	0	0	3
Vikings	7	10	0	17	34

at Mall of America Field at Hubert H. Humphrey Metrodome, Minneapolis, Minnesota

- Date: January 17
- Game time: 12:00 p.m.
- Game weather: None (indoor stadium)
- Game attendance: 63,547
- Referee: Walt Anderson (66)
- TV announcers (Fox): Joe Buck, Troy Aikman, Pam Oliver and Chris Myers
- Recap, Game Book

Game information

First quarter

- MIN – Sidney Rice 47-yard pass from Brett Favre (Ryan Longwell kick), 4:04. Vikings 7–0. Drive: 4 plays, 61 yards, 1:44.

Second quarter

- DAL – Shaun Suisham 33-yard field goal, 12:11. Vikings 7–3. Drive: 13 plays, 67 yards, 6:53.
- MIN – Sidney Rice 16-yard pass from Brett Favre (Ryan Longwell kick), 7:23. Vikings 14–3. Drive: 10 plays, 80 yards, 4:48.
- MIN – Ryan Longwell 23-yard field goal, 3:46. Vikings 17–3. Drive: 6 plays, 14 yards, 2:43.

Third quarter

- No scoring plays.

Fourth quarter

- MIN – Ryan Longwell 28-yard field goal, 14:23. Vikings 20–3. Drive: 4 plays, 5 yards, 1:44.
- MIN – Sidney Rice 45-yard pass from Brett Favre (Ryan Longwell kick), 7:32. Vikings 27–3. Drive: 7 plays, 86 yards, 4:27.
- MIN – Visanthe Shiancoe 11-yard pass from Brett Favre (Ryan Longwell kick), 1:55. Vikings 34–3. Drive: 6 plays, 37 yards, 3:31.

Top passers

- DAL – Tony Romo – 22/35, 198 yards, INT
- MIN – Brett Favre – 15/24, 234 yards, 4 TD

Top rushers

- DAL – Felix Jones – 14 rushes, 69 yards
- MIN – Adrian Peterson – 26 rushes, 63 yards

Top receivers

- DAL – Jason Witten – 10 receptions, 98 yards
- MIN – Sidney Rice – 6 receptions, 141 yards, 3 TD

This game began while many TV show hosts and sports analysts were convinced that a red-hot Dallas team was going to end the Vikings' explosive season with Brett Favre. Tony Romo had been throwing more accurately than ever, and because the Vikings had a week off, even their own fans were feeling the pressure of facing a tough Dallas team.

Entering the playoffs as the NFC's number 2 seed, the Vikings began their playoff run at home in the NFC Divisional Round against the number 3 Dallas Cowboys. Minnesota delivered the opening strike in the first quarter as quarterback Brett Favre found wide receiver Sidney Rice on a 47-yard touchdown pass. The Cowboys got on the board in the second quarter with a 33-yard field goal from kicker Shaun Suisham, yet the Vikings came right back with Favre hooking up with Rice again on a 16-yard touchdown pass, followed by a 23-yard field goal from kicker Ryan Longwell. After a scoreless third quarter, Minnesota delivered the final strike in the fourth quarter as Longwell nailed a 28-yard field goal, followed by Favre's 45-yard touchdown pass to Rice and his 11-yard touchdown pass to tight end Visanthe Shiancoe.

With the win, the Vikings advanced to their ninth NFC Championship Game in team history, and their first appearance since the 2000 season with a 13–4 record. Brett Favre became the oldest player to start and win a playoff game, but also won his first postseason game in four against Dallas. This would be the Vikings' final win in a playoff game until (after) 2017. This was also the last playoff game ever in the Metrodome, as the Vikings would not win the division again until the 2015 season, when they were playing at TCF Bank Stadium while waiting for U.S. Bank Stadium to be completed.

==== NFC Championship Game: at New Orleans Saints ====
NFC Championship: Minnesota Vikings at New Orleans Saints – Game summary

Quarter	1	2	3	4	OT	Total
Vikings	14	0	7	7	0	28
Saints	7	7	7	7	3	31

at Louisiana Superdome, New Orleans, Louisiana

- Date: January 24
- Game time: 5:40 p.m.
- Game weather: None (indoor stadium)
- Game attendance: 71,276
- Referee: Pete Morelli (135)
- TV announcers (Fox): Joe Buck, Troy Aikman, Pam Oliver and Chris Myers
- Recap, Game Book

Game information

First quarter

- MIN – Adrian Peterson 19-yard run (Ryan Longwell kick), 9:35. Vikings 7–0. Drive: 10 plays, 80 yards, 5:25.
- NO – Pierre Thomas 38-yard pass from Drew Brees (Garrett Hartley kick), 6:30. Tied 7–7. Drive: 7 plays, 76 yards, 3:05.
- MIN – Sidney Rice 5-yard pass from Brett Favre (Ryan Longwell kick), 2:11. Vikings 14–7. Drive: 10 plays, 73 yards, 4:19.

Second quarter

- NO – Devery Henderson 9-yard pass from Drew Brees (Garrett Hartley kick), 10:30. Tied 14–14. Drive: 7 plays, 64 yards, 2:51.

Third quarter

- NO – Pierre Thomas 9-yard run (Garrett Hartley kick), 12:56. Saints 21–14. Drive: 4 plays, 37 yards, 2:04.
- MIN – Adrian Peterson 1-yard run (Ryan Longwell kick), 7:35. Tied 21–21. Drive: 9 plays, 80 yards, 5:21.

Fourth quarter

- NO – Reggie Bush 5-yard pass from Drew Brees (Garrett Hartley kick), 12:39. Saints 28–21. Drive: 3 plays, 7 yards, 1:31.
- MIN – Adrian Peterson 2-yard run (Ryan Longwell kick), 4:58. Tied 28–28. Drive: 7 plays, 57 yards, 2:59.

Overtime

- NO – Garrett Hartley 40-yard field goal, 10:15. Saints 31–28. Drive: 10 plays, 39 yards, 4:45.

Top passers

- MIN – Brett Favre – 28/46, 310 yards, TD, 2 INT
- NO – Drew Brees – 17/31, 197 yards, 3 TD

Top rushers

- MIN – Adrian Peterson – 25 rushes, 122 yards, 3 TD
- NO – Pierre Thomas – 14 rushes, 61 yards, TD

Top receivers

- MIN – Bernard Berrian – 9 receptions, 102 yards
- NO – Devery Henderson – 4 receptions, 39 yards, TD

Coming off their dominant divisional home win over the Cowboys, the Vikings flew to the Louisiana Superdome for the NFC Championship Game against the top-seeded New Orleans Saints. Minnesota delivered the opening strike in the first quarter with running back Adrian Peterson's 19-yard touchdown run. The Saints answered with quarterback Drew Brees completing a 38-yard touchdown pass to running back Pierre Thomas, yet the Vikings regained the lead as quarterback Brett Favre found wide receiver Sidney Rice on a 5-yard touchdown pass. In the second quarter, New Orleans tied the game again on Brees' 9-yard touchdown pass to wide receiver Devery Henderson.

The Saints took the lead in the third quarter with Thomas' 9-yard touchdown run, yet Minnesota tied the game as Peterson got a 1-yard touchdown run. In the fourth quarter, New Orleans got the lead again as Brees hooked up with running back Reggie Bush on a 5-yard touchdown pass, yet the Vikings tied the game again with Peterson's 2-yard touchdown run. After stopping the Saints offense the Vikings got the ball back and were close to field goal range in the final 30 seconds when they were flagged for too many men on the field; on the next play Favre rolled to the right as a hole opened up, but instead of running forward he threw the ball deep across his body and it was picked off by the Saints' Tracy Porter, forcing overtime.

In overtime, after a 40-yard kickoff return by Pierre Thomas, New Orleans drove downfield, converting on 4th-and-1 before a controversial pass interference penalty against linebacker Ben Leber brought them into field goal range. Three plays later, Saints kicker Garrett Hartley nailed the game-ending 40-yard field goal.

With the loss, the Vikings' season ended with an overall record of 13–5. Doomed by turnovers – the Vikings had six fumbles, three of which they lost, plus two interceptions by Brett Favre – the Vikings lost another NFC Championship Game in overtime, this one reminiscent of the 1998–99 loss to the Falcons in the Metrodome. The Saints' performance in the game, and leading into it, would later be subject to investigation, as it was eventually revealed that the Saints had been involved in a bounty program beginning in the 2009 season.

== Statistics ==
=== Team leaders ===
Category	Player(s)	Value
Passing yards	Brett Favre	4,202
Passing touchdowns	Brett Favre	33
Rushing yards	Adrian Peterson	1,383
Rushing touchdowns	Adrian Peterson	18 *
Receiving yards	Sidney Rice	1,312
Receiving touchdowns	Visanthe Shiancoe	11
Points	Ryan Longwell	132
Kickoff return yards	Percy Harvin	1,156
Punt return yards	Darius Reynaud	308
Tackles	Chad Greenway	99
Sacks	Jared Allen	14.5
Interceptions	Cedric Griffin	4
Forced fumbles	Jared Allen	5

* Vikings single season record

=== League rankings ===
Category	Total yards	Yards per game	NFL rank (out of 32)
Passing offense	4,156	259.8	8th
Rushing offense	1,918	119.9	13th
Total offense	6,074	379.6	5th
Passing defense	3,494	218.4	19th
Rushing defense	1,394	87.1	2nd
Total defense	4,888	305.5	6th

== Pro Bowl ==
Eight Minnesota Vikings players were originally selected for the 2010 Pro Bowl: five on offense (Brett Favre, Adrian Peterson, Sidney Rice, Bryant McKinnie and Steve Hutchinson), two on defense (Jared Allen and Kevin Williams) and one special teamer (Heath Farwell). Of these, six were selected to start the game, with Favre and Rice going as reserves. However, as Philadelphia Eagles wide receiver DeSean Jackson was voted as a starter at both wide receiver and kickoff returner, a replacement had to be selected at KR; Percy Harvin was added to the roster on January 4, 2010, making it nine Vikings in the NFC roster. Antoine Winfield was added to the NFC roster as an extra cornerback on January 19, 2010, bringing the Vikings' contribution to the roster to 10 players.

Had the Vikings reached Super Bowl XLIV, none of their players would have appeared in the 2010 Pro Bowl, but they lost to the New Orleans Saints in the NFC Championship Game. Nevertheless, QB Brett Favre (ankle), CB Antoine Winfield (foot) and KR Percy Harvin (migraine headaches) all pulled out as a result of their various ailments. OT Bryant McKinnie was cut from the NFC roster on January 30 after missing four of the five practice sessions and attending only one team meeting; he claimed, via text message to the Star Tribune, that his absence was due to a lack of physical fitness. McKinnie was not replaced in the roster and was also fined his game check.
