= Visanthe Shiancoe =

English-born American football player (born 1980)

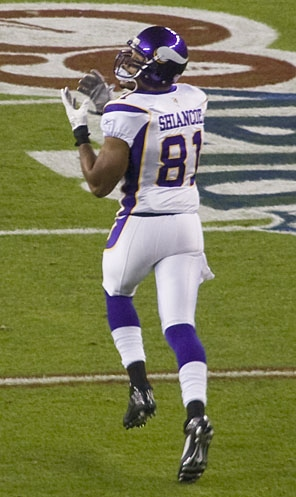
- Shiancoe with the Minnesota Vikings in 2009

No. 82, 81, 80
- Position: Tight end

Personal information
- Born: June 18, 1980 (age 46); Birmingham, England
- Listed height: 6 ft 4 in (1.93 m)
- Listed weight: 250 lb (113 kg)

Career information
- High school: Montgomery Blair (Silver Spring, Maryland, U.S.)
- College: Morgan State (1999–2002)
- NFL draft: 2003: 3rd round, 91st overall pick

Career history
- New York Giants (2003−2006); Minnesota Vikings (2007−2011); New England Patriots (2012); Baltimore Ravens (2013)*; Tennessee Titans (2013)
- * Offseason or practice squad member only

Career NFL statistics
- Receptions: 245
- Receiving yards: 2,679
- Receiving touchdowns: 27
- Stats at Pro Football Reference

Visanthe Shiancoe (/vɪˈsɑːnθ ˈʃæŋkoʊ/; born June 18, 1980) is an English-American former professional football player who was a tight end in the National Football League (NFL). After playing college football for the Morgan State Bears, he was selected by the New York Giants in the third round of the 2003 NFL draft. He played for the Giants for four seasons from 2003 to 2006 and the Minnesota Vikings for five seasons from 2007 to 2011. He played for the New England Patriots in 2012 and the Tennessee Titans in 2013.

== Early life ==
Shiancoe was born in Birmingham, England to a Liberian mother and a Ghanaian father. As an infant, he emigrated to the United States with his mother, settling in Silver Spring, Maryland.

Shiancoe played high school football for Montgomery Blair High School in Silver Spring. He attended Morgan State University in Baltimore, Maryland where he transformed himself from a 190-pound freshman to a 250-pound senior tight end.

== Professional career ==
Pre-draft measurables
Height	Weight	Arm length	Hand span	40-yard dash	10-yard split	20-yard split	20-yard shuttle	Three-cone drill	Vertical jump	Broad jump	Bench press
6 ft 4 3/8 in (1.94 m)	251 lb (114 kg)	33 1/2 in (0.85 m)	10 1/4 in (0.26 m)	4.68 s	1.62 s	2.71 s	4.31 s	7.09 s	39.5 in (1.00 m)	10 ft 0 in (3.05 m)	28 reps
All values from NFL Combine

=== New York Giants ===
Shiancoe was selected in the third round (91st overall) in the 2003 NFL draft by the New York Giants. He played for the Giants for four seasons, mostly serving as a backup to Jeremy Shockey.

=== Minnesota Vikings ===
Shiancoe signed a five-year, $18.2 million contract with the Minnesota Vikings as a free agent in 2007. He compiled 208 receptions for 2,424 yards and 24 touchdowns in his five seasons as a Viking, in regular season games. Shiancoe played in all 80 games over those five seasons, of which he started 66. He led NFC tight ends with seven touchdowns in 2008 and ranked third by a tight end in the NFL.

=== New England Patriots ===
Shiancoe agreed to a one-year deal with the New England Patriots on July 24, 2012, reportedly worth $1.2 million. He was activated on November 11, 2012, after an injury to Aaron Hernandez and a suspension of Brandon Bolden. On December 11, 2012, he was released.

=== Baltimore Ravens ===
On July 28, 2013, Shiancoe signed a one-year deal to play for the Baltimore Ravens. The contract was considered a "qualifying contract" under which Shiancoe stood to make the veteran minimum for a player with 10 or more years of service ($940,000) while counting as only $555,000 against the Ravens' salary cap. The signing was prompted by a season-ending hip injury suffered during training camp by Dennis Pitta. After less than a month on the team, Shiancoe was released after the third week of preseason on August 25, 2013.

=== Tennessee Titans ===
On December 3, 2013, Shiancoe signed with the Tennessee Titans. On December 10, the Titans released Shiancoe.

== NFL career statistics ==
Legend
**Bold**	Career high

=== Regular season ===
Year	Team	Games		Receiving					
Year	Team	GP	GS	Tgt	Rec	Yds	Avg	Lng	TD
2003	NYG	**16**	7	23	10	56	5.6	10	2
2004	NYG	**16**	7	7	5	25	5.0	9	1
2005	NYG	**16**	5	17	8	91	11.4	17	0
2006	NYG	**16**	4	14	12	81	6.8	16	0
2007	MIN	**16**	**15**	43	27	323	12.0	**79**	1
2008	MIN	**16**	**15**	59	42	**596**	**14.2**	40	7
2009	MIN	**16**	13	**79**	**56**	566	10.1	27	**11**
2010	MIN	**16**	9	**79**	47	530	11.3	33	2
2011	MIN	**16**	14	70	36	409	11.4	37	3
2012	NWE	4	0	1	0	0	0.0	0	0
2013	TEN	1	1	2	2	2	1.0	3	0
Career		149	90	394	245	2,679	10.9	79	27

=== Playoffs ===
Year	Team	Games		Receiving					
Year	Team	GP	GS	Tgt	Rec	Yds	Avg	Lng	TD
2005	NYG	1	0	1	1	4	4.0	4	0
2006	NYG	1	0	1	1	4	4.0	4	0
2008	MIN	1	1	3	1	7	7.0	7	0
2009	MIN	**2**	**2**	**7**	**5**	**94**	**18.8**	**26**	**1**
Career		5	3	12	8	109	13.6	26	1

== Television appearances ==
Shiancoe was a contestant on NBC's Minute to Win It on September 8, 2010, playing to win money for the National Kidney Foundation. When he could not perform the card trick, where he had to blow off a deck of 53 playing cards with one joker at the bottom remaining on the bottle in a minute, he successfully performed the same trick on NFL Network again in less than 30 seconds, only to realize that the final Joker card was glued on.

=== Towel incident ===
Fox aired a post game segment following a victory over the Detroit Lions in 2008. Vikings owner Zygi Wilf was presenting the game ball to coach Brad Childress' son, Andrew, who had enlisted in the United States Marine Corps the day before. In the background, Shiancoe was shown unclothed for a moment before covering himself with a towel. According to the NFL and Fox Sports, the image lasted a fifth of a second. Fox Sports apologized for airing the image. Through his agent, Shiancoe said he was embarrassed by the unintentional incident.

== Personal life ==
Shiancoe currently resides in Prince George's County, Maryland. Although his first name has been commonly mispronounced as vi-SAWN-tee (/vɪˈsɑːntiː/) or vi-SAWN-tae (/vɪˈsɑːnteɪ/) he has clarified that the correct pronunciation is vi-SAWNTH (/vɪˈsɑːnθ/).

He plans to become involved in causes in his mother's home country of Liberia.
