= Vinny Perretta =

American football player (born 1985)

No. 15
- Position: Wide receiver

Personal information
- Born: October 14, 1985 (age 41); San Diego, California, U.S.
- Listed height: 5 ft 9 in (1.75 m)
- Listed weight: 186 lb (84 kg)

Career information
- High school: La Costa Canyon (Carlsbad, California)
- College: Boise State
- NFL draft: 2009: undrafted

Career history
- Minnesota Vikings (2009–2010)*
- * Offseason or practice squad member only

Vinny Perretta (born October 14, 1985) is an American former professional football wide receiver. He played college football at Boise State. He was signed by the Minnesota Vikings of the National Football League (NFL) as an undrafted free agent in 2009. He retired from the NFL in April 2010.

== Early life ==
Perretta is a 2004 graduate of La Costa Canyon High School in Encinitas, CA where he was a two-time First-team All-Avocado League selection. He earned offensive team MVP honors and was on all-academic team. He gained over 1,000 yards in total offense as a senior with 12 touchdowns, including two on kickoff returns. He lettered in football three times and track and field once.

== College career ==
Perretta is best known for throwing the touchdown pass in overtime to Derek Schouman in the 2007 Fiesta Bowl to help Boise State beat Oklahoma 43–42 in what many consider to be the best college football game ever played.

In 2008, as a senior, Perretta caught 36 passes for 578 yards and 2 touchdowns and helped Boise State post an undefeated 12–0 regular season mark. In 2007, he played in four games before being sidelined with shoulder injury. He made nine catches for 120 yards and five rushes for 30 yards and a touchdown. In 2006, he played wide receiver and running back and finished third on team in rushing with 316 yards and three touchdowns on 55 carries while finishing fifth on in receiving with 17 catches for 124 yards and two touchdowns and was named to the All-WAC academic team. In 2005, he was part of Boise State's wide receiver rotation and played in all 13 games, catching 12 passes for 169 yards. In 2004, he was named offensive scout team player of the year and he red-shirted after walking on prior to the 2004 season.

== Professional career ==
On May 8, 2009, the Minnesota Vikings signed Perretta and Boise State teammate Ian Johnson. Perretta was re-signed on April 15, 2010. However, he decided to retire shortly after.

== Post-career life ==
Perretta is now a sales representative in Boise, Idaho. He is married with two children. Peretta enjoys golf as a hobby.
