= Heath Farwell =

American football player and coach (born 1981)

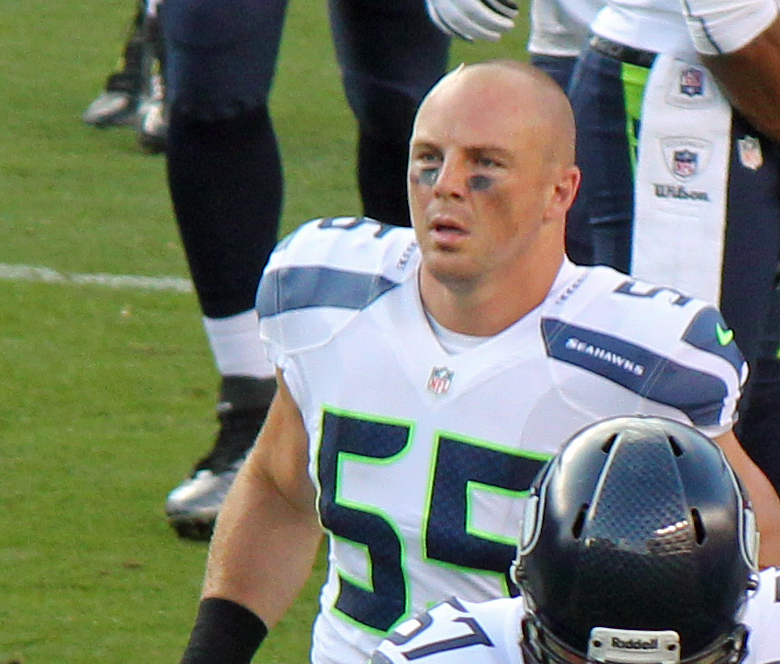
- Farwell with the Seattle Seahawks in 2012

Jacksonville Jaguars
- Title: Associate head coach/Special teams coordinator

Personal information
- Born: December 31, 1981 (age 44); Fontana, California, U.S.
- Listed height: 6 ft 0 in (1.83 m)
- Listed weight: 235 lb (107 kg)

Career information
- Position: Linebacker (No. 59, 55)
- High school: Corona (CA)
- College: San Jose State (2000); San Diego State (2001-2004)
- NFL draft: 2005: undrafted

Career history

Playing
- Minnesota Vikings (2005–2010); Seattle Seahawks (2011–2014)

Coaching
- Seattle Seahawks (2016–2017) Assistant special teams coach; Carolina Panthers (2018) Assistant special teams coach; Buffalo Bills (2019–2021) Special teams coordinator; Jacksonville Jaguars (2022–present); Special teams coordinator (2022-2025); Associate head coach/special teams coordinator (2026-present)

Awards and highlights
- Super Bowl champion (XLVIII); Pro Bowl (2009)

Career NFL statistics
- Total tackles: 157
- Forced fumbles: 1
- Fumble recoveries: 4
- Stats at Pro Football Reference

Heath Charles Farwell (born December 31, 1981) is an American football coach and former linebacker who is the associate head coach and special teams coordinator for the Jacksonville Jaguars of the National Football League (NFL).

Farwell played college football for the San Diego State Aztecs and was signed by the Minnesota Vikings as an undrafted free agent in 2005. He played for 10 seasons in the NFL with the Vikings and Seattle Seahawks and was the special teams captain during his tenure with the Seahawks. He has also served as the special teams coordinator for the Buffalo Bills and an assistant coach for the Carolina Panthers and Seattle Seahawks.

== Early life ==
Farwell attended Corona High School in Corona, California, and was a letterman in football, baseball, and track&field. As a junior, he had 96 tackles and 12 sacks en route to all-league honors. He recorded 129 tackles and 10 sacks as a senior, earning first-team all-Mountain View League as well as all-Riverside Press-Enterprise county all-star. In 2014, his football number was retired by Corona High School.

== College career ==
Farwell played at San Jose State in 2000 before transferring to San Diego State University. After sitting out the 2001 season due to NCAA transfer rules, Farwell debuted with the San Diego State Aztecs in 2002 as a sophomore. He was ranked 5th on the team with 59 tackles, and his three quarterback sacks were 4th in the Mountain West Conference among linebackers. During the season, he also recorded 10 tackles for loss, while having a season best eight tackles versus UCLA. His four forced fumbles were tops in Mountain West. The following year, he started six games at outside linebacker and finished the season with 52 tackles and 3.5 quarterback sacks. He also recovered two fumbles on the season versus Air Force and UCLA, and had a season high eight tackles versus Utah. As a senior, he started all 11 games for the Aztecs and was third on the team with 69 total tackles. He also added a team best seven sacks, two interceptions and forced four fumbles. Farwell finished his career with 180 tackles, 13.5 sacks and nine forced fumbles in three seasons at San Diego State.

== Professional career ==
Pre-draft measurables
Height	Weight	40-yard dash	20-yard shuttle	Three-cone drill	Vertical jump	Broad jump
6 ft 0 in (1.83 m)	224 lb (102 kg)	4.60 s	4.43 s	7.00 s	36.0 in (0.91 m)	9 ft 9 in (2.97 m)
All values from Pro Day

=== Minnesota Vikings ===
Farwell was signed as an undrafted free agent in 2005 out of San Diego State. He was named the special teams MVP for the Vikings at the end of the 2006 NFL season. In the team's preseason opener in 2008, Farwell suffered a torn ACL in his knee and was placed on season-ending injured reserve.

Farwell received a $7.5 million contract over three years from the Vikings. He was voted as a NFC 2010 Pro Bowl special teams starter.

On September 3, 2011, Farwell was waived by the Vikings. His release cleared $1.75 million in salary cap space for the Vikings.

=== Seattle Seahawks ===
Farwell signed with the Seattle Seahawks on October 19, 2011. On March 13, 2012, he was re-signed by the Seattle Seahawks. He served as a special teams captain for the Seahawks from 2012 onward. Farwell and the Seahawks won Super Bowl XLVIII after they defeated the Denver Broncos by a score of 43–8. The Seahawks placed Farwell on injured reserve on August 26, 2014.

== NFL career statistics ==
Legend
**Bold**	Career high

=== Regular season ===
Year	Team	Games		Tackles					Interceptions					Fumbles			
Year	Team	GP	GS	Cmb	Solo	Ast	Sck	TFL	Int	Yds	TD	Lng	PD	FF	FR	Yds	TD
2005	MIN	7	0	8	7	1	0.0	0	0	0	0	0	0	0	0	0	0
2006	MIN	**16**	0	27	21	6	0.0	0	0	0	0	0	0	0	1	0	0
2007	MIN	**16**	0	**30**	**25**	5	0.0	0	0	0	0	0	0	0	1	0	0
2009	MIN	**16**	0	19	18	1	0.0	0	0	0	0	0	0	0	**2**	0	0
2010	MIN	**16**	0	16	14	2	0.0	0	0	0	0	0	0	0	0	0	0
2011	SEA	11	0	21	14	7	0.0	0	0	0	0	0	0	0	0	0	0
2012	SEA	**16**	0	20	10	**10**	0.0	0	0	0	0	0	0	0	0	0	0
2013	SEA	**16**	0	16	9	7	0.0	0	0	0	0	0	0	**1**	0	0	0
		114	0	157	118	39	0.0	0	0	0	0	0	0	1	4	0	0

=== Playoffs ===
Year	Team	Games		Tackles					Interceptions					Fumbles			
Year	Team	GP	GS	Cmb	Solo	Ast	Sck	TFL	Int	Yds	TD	Lng	PD	FF	FR	Yds	TD
2009	MIN	2	0	2	**2**	0	0.0	0	0	0	0	0	0	0	0	0	0
2012	SEA	2	0	1	0	1	0.0	0	0	0	0	0	0	0	0	0	0
2013	SEA	**3**	0	**3**	1	**2**	0.0	0	0	0	0	0	0	0	0	0	0
		7	0	6	3	3	0.0	0	0	0	0	0	0	0	0	0	0

== Coaching career ==
=== Seattle Seahawks ===
On August 16, 2016, Farwell returned to the Seahawks, where he served as a two-time special teams captain in his four years in Seattle (2011–14), as a coaching assistant.

=== Carolina Panthers ===
In 2018, Farwell was hired by the Carolina Panthers as their assistant special teams coordinator.

=== Buffalo Bills ===
In 2019, Farwell was hired by the Buffalo Bills as their special teams coordinator under head coach Sean McDermott.

=== Jacksonville Jaguars ===
On February 17, 2022, Farwell was hired by the Jacksonville Jaguars as their special teams coordinator under head coach Doug Pederson. In 2025, Farwell was retained under new Jaguars head coach Liam Coen.

On June 30, 2026, Farwell added "associate head coach" to his title.
