= Jeff Dugan =

American football player (born 1981)

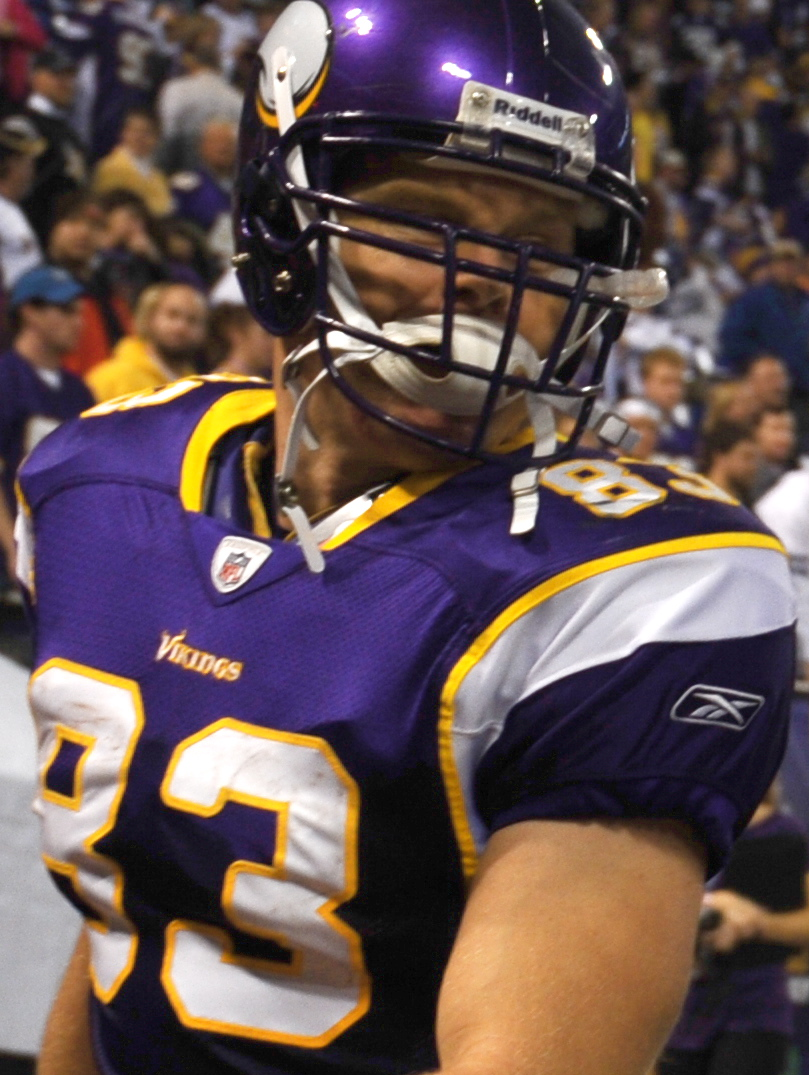
- Dugan in 2009

No. 83
- Position: Tight end

Personal information
- Born: April 8, 1981 (age 45); Pittsburgh, Pennsylvania, U.S.
- Listed height: 6 ft 4 in (1.93 m)
- Listed weight: 258 lb (117 kg)

Career information
- High school: Central Catholic (Pittsburgh)
- College: Maryland (1999–2003)
- NFL draft: 2004: 7th round, 220th overall pick

Career history
- Minnesota Vikings (2004–2010)

Awards and highlights
- Second-team All-ACC (2003)

Career NFL statistics
- Games played: 79
- Receptions: 27
- Receiving yards: 191
- Receiving touchdowns: 3
- Stats at Pro Football Reference

Jeffery Stephen Dugan (born April 8, 1981) is an American former professional football player who was a tight end and fullback for the Minnesota Vikings of the National Football League (NFL). He was selected by the Vikings in seventh round of 2004 NFL draft. He played college football for the Maryland Terrapins. Before college Dugan attended Central Catholic High School, where NFL quarterbacks Dan Marino and Marc Bulger attended.

== College career ==
Dugan attended the University of Maryland, College Park, and he finished his career with 55 receptions for 649 yards (11.8 yards per rec. avg.), and three touchdowns. As a true freshman, he was named the team's freshman of the year and was a Freshman All-American third-team selection by the Sports Page. After the first game of the year, he took over the starting job. He was second on the team in receptions, with 25. In his sophomore year, he started 10 games and was used primarily as a blocker, but had 7 receptions for 64 yards and a touchdown. In his junior year, he started every game and caught 9 passes for 91 yards and a touchdown and was named ACC honorable mention. In his senior year in 2003, he caught 14 passes for 175 yards and was named to the All-ACC second-team.

== Professional career ==
Pre-draft measurables
Height	Weight	Arm length	Hand span	40-yard dash	10-yard split	20-yard split	20-yard shuttle	Three-cone drill	Vertical jump	Broad jump	Bench press
6 ft 4 3/8 in (1.94 m)	263 lb (119 kg)	31 3/8 in (0.80 m)	10 in (0.25 m)	4.95 s	1.68 s	2.82 s	4.32 s	7.40 s	28.0 in (0.71 m)	9 ft 1 in (2.77 m)	21 reps
All values from Pro Day

Dugan was selected by the Minnesota Vikings in the seventh round of the 2004 NFL draft. In his rookie season, he played in 14 of 16 regular season games, made two starts, and played in two playoff games. Dugan played in the third most games, for Viking rookies that season. Jeff had a career-high three tackles on special teams in a game against Green Bay on November 14, notched a special teams tackle versus Detroit, and made his first career start on Monday Night Football against the Philadelphia Eagles on September 20. Jeff's 2005 season consisted of only one game against the Atlanta Falcons on October 2. He was then listed as inactive for 15 regular season games. Dugan made his first career playoff start versus Green Bay, on January 9, 2005.

In 2006, Dugan made his transition from tight end to full back, when Tony Richardson had a season-ending injury. Dugan handled the transition admirably, and assisted Chester Taylor, as he ran for 1,214 yards, which became the fourth highest in Vikings history. Dugan also helped a pair of running backs rush for 100+ yards in the final seven games of the season. Dugan contributed on special teams as well.

On September 3, 2011, Dugan was waived by the Minnesota Vikings to make room for the 53-man roster.

== Personal ==
Attending classes during the offseason, Jeff obtained an MBA from Northwestern's Kellogg School of Management.

== See also ==
- List of Maryland Terrapins football people
