= Asher Allen =

American football player (born 1988)

No. 21
- Position: Cornerback

Personal information
- Born: January 22, 1988 (age 38); Tucker, Georgia, U.S.
- Listed height: 5 ft 9 in (1.75 m)
- Listed weight: 194 lb (88 kg)

Career information
- High school: Tucker
- College: Georgia (2006–2008)
- NFL draft: 2009: 3rd round, 86th overall pick

Career history
- Minnesota Vikings (2009–2011)

Career NFL statistics
- Total tackles: 134
- Sacks: 1
- Forced fumbles: 1
- Pass deflections: 11
- Interceptions: 4
- Stats at Pro Football Reference

Asher Allen (born January 22, 1988) is an American former professional football player who was a cornerback for three seasons in the National Football League (NFL) for the Minnesota Vikings. After playing college football for Georgia, he was selected by the Vikings in the third round of the 2009 NFL draft.

== Professional career ==
Pre-draft measurables
Height	Weight	Arm length	Hand span	40-yard dash	10-yard split	20-yard split	20-yard shuttle	Three-cone drill	Vertical jump	Broad jump	Bench press
5 ft 9 1/2 in (1.77 m)	194 lb (88 kg)	29 1/2 in (0.75 m)	8 1/2 in (0.22 m)	4.65 s	1.60 s	2.66 s	4.30 s	6.93 s	35.0 in (0.89 m)	9 ft 7 in (2.92 m)	22 reps
All values from NFL Combine

Allen made his NFL debut in week 7 against the Pittsburgh Steelers due to an injury to starting cornerback Antoine Winfield. In the game, Allen made two key fourth quarter plays. He first made a touchdown-saving tackle on a kick return by Stefan Logan. Later in the drive he caused a fumble on Steelers quarterback Ben Roethlisberger, resulting in a fourth down. In week 11 against the Seattle Seahawks, Allen intercepted a pass from Matt Hasselbeck for his first NFL interception. He was placed on injured reserve at the end of the 2011 season due to a concussion. After three seasons of play, he announced his retirement from the NFL on May 30, 2012.

== Personal ==
Allen is a cousin of former Dallas Cowboys wide receiver Michael Irvin. Allen is married and is a member of the Jehovah's Witnesses.
