= Jayme Mitchell =

American football player (born 1984)

No. 92, 97
- Position: Defensive end

Personal information
- Born: March 15, 1984 (age 42); Jackson, Mississippi, U.S.
- Listed height: 6 ft 6 in (1.98 m)
- Listed weight: 285 lb (129 kg)

Career information
- College: Ole Miss
- NFL draft: 2006: undrafted

Career history
- Minnesota Vikings (2006–2010); Cleveland Browns (2010–2011); Tampa Bay Buccaneers (2012)*
- * Offseason or practice squad member only

Career NFL statistics
- Total tackles: 55
- Sacks: 6.5
- Forced fumbles: 2
- Fumble recoveries: 1
- Stats at Pro Football Reference

Jayme Dondrell Mitchell (born March 15, 1984) is an American former professional football player who was a defensive end in the National Football League (NFL). He played college football for the Ole Miss Rebels and was signed by the Minnesota Vikings as an undrafted free agent in 2006.

Mitchell has also played for the Cleveland Browns.

== College career ==
Mitchell started 20 of the 45 games he played during his career at the University of Mississippi and finished with 105 tackles, including 67 solo stops and 19 tackles for a loss. He also notched 5.0 career sacks, forced 2 fumbles and recovered another. As a senior, he started all 11 games at LDE. As a junior, he played in 8 games, starting 7 at LDE. He played in all 13 games as a sophomore, starting vs. South Carolina. He blocked a 30-yard FG at Vanderbilt and intercepted his 1st pass vs. LSU. Mitchell played in all 13 games as a true freshman and started his 1st career game at LDT against Mississippi State and notched 3 tackles in the Independence Bowl win over Nebraska.

== Professional career ==
=== Pre-draft ===
Mitchell was timed at 4.78 in the 40-yard dash and measured 6-6, 272 pounds.

=== Minnesota Vikings ===
In 2006, he played in 13 games after signing as an undrafted rookie free agent. He made 9 tackles and had 3 sacks. In 2007, he posted a sack and 9 QB hurries while playing in 10 games, notching 49 tackles in limited action. He spent the entire 2008 season on the injured reserve list after injuring his knee in the first preseason game against Seattle.

=== Cleveland Browns ===
He was traded to the Browns on October 5, 2010, for a late round 2012 draft pick. He did not play a game for the Browns in 2010, but signed a two-year contract on July 29, 2011, with Cleveland. He was released on March 16, 2012.

=== Tampa Bay Buccaneers ===
Mitchell signed with the Tampa Bay Buccaneers on June 4, 2012. He left the team during training camp on August 8, and was released on August 10.
