= Ian Johnson (American football) =

American football player (born 1985)

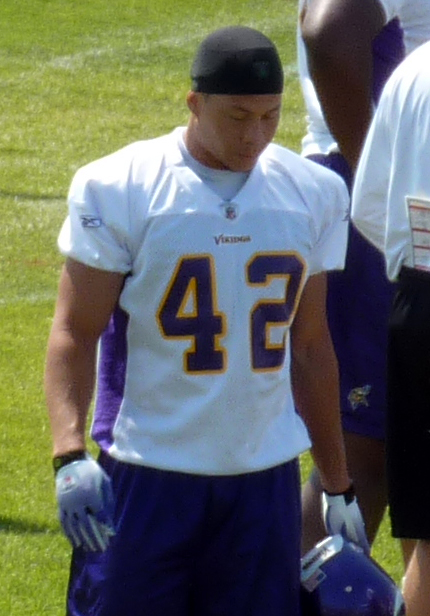
- 2009 Vikings training camp

No. 42, 28, 41
- Position: Running back

Personal information
- Born: September 25, 1985 (age 41); San Dimas, California, U.S.
- Listed height: 5 ft 11 in (1.80 m)
- Listed weight: 212 lb (96 kg)

Career information
- High school: La Verne (CA) Damien
- College: Boise State
- NFL draft: 2009: undrafted

Career history
- Minnesota Vikings (2009–2010)*; Arizona Cardinals (2010)*; Detroit Lions (2010–2011)*; San Francisco 49ers (2011)*; Miami Dolphins (2011)*
- * Offseason or practice squad member only

Awards and highlights
- First-team All-American (2006); 2× First-team All-WAC (2006, 2007); Second-team All-WAC (2008)
- Stats at Pro Football Reference

Ian Blake Johnson (born September 25, 1985) is an American former professional football player who was a running back in the National Football League (NFL). He played college football at Boise State.

== Early life ==
Born in Monrovia, California, Johnson attended Damien High School in La Verne. In football, he was named Inland Valley Offensive Player of the Year, L.A. Times All-San Gabriel Valley first-team, San Gabriel Valley Tribune All-Area first-team, Daily Bulletin Inland Valley All-Area Team, All-Sierra League MVP, and CIF Division II first-team all-league as a senior. Johnson was also a team captain for the Spartans and set Damien High School records in career rushing yards, season rushing yards (2,009 yards) and points scored (347). He was a high school teammate of Arena Football League star, Nick Davila. Also a track & field athlete, Johnson was an All-Sierra League and All-CIF pick while competing in the 100-meter dash (11.17 s), 200-meter dash (23.03 s), and 4 × 100 m relay (43.38 s).

== College career ==
Johnson was redshirted for the 2004 season. In 2005, he rushed for 1,445 yards, at that time the second-most by a freshman in Broncos history, scoring 14 touchdowns. In his career at BSU, Johnson ran for 4,158 yards and 58 touchdowns, surpassing Marshall Faulk to set a new WAC record for career rushing touchdowns.

The Broncos finished the 2006 regular season unbeaten (12–0) and became only the second-team from outside the BCS conferences to play in a BCS bowl game. They played in the Fiesta Bowl against the Oklahoma Sooners, the year's Big 12 champion. Johnson scored the game-winning two-point conversion in overtime on a Statue of Liberty play to the left side. Boise State defeated Oklahoma 43–42, completing a perfect 13–0 season. Johnson rushed for 100 yards and a touchdown.

Johnson had been considered a dark horse Heisman Trophy candidate. Shortly after the announcement of his consideration for the Heisman Trophy, however, a collapsed lung sidelined Johnson for one game and hurt his chances of winning the Heisman. After the end of the 2006 regular season, he led NCAA Division I-A in scoring with 24 touchdowns. On December 7, 2006, Sports Illustrated named Johnson to their 2006 All-American first-team. This made Johnson the first Boise State athlete to be named to a major All-American team. CBSSports.com also named him All-America in 2006. He was also named to the All-WAC team, won a Division I-A Offensive Player of the Week award, two WAC Offensive Player of the Week awards, and was a semifinalist for the Doak Walker Award. Johnson ran an official 4.58 40-yard dash at Boise State.

== Professional career ==
Pre-draft measurables
Height	Weight	Arm length	Hand span	40-yard dash	10-yard split	20-yard split	20-yard shuttle	Three-cone drill	Vertical jump	Broad jump	Bench press	Wonderlic
5 ft 11 1/4 in (1.81 m)	212 lb (96 kg)	31 in (0.79 m)	9 1/2 in (0.24 m)	4.46 s	1.58 s	2.60 s	4.18 s	6.86 s	33 in (0.84 m)	9 ft 8 in (2.95 m)	26 reps	26
All values from NFL Combine/Boise State's Pro Day

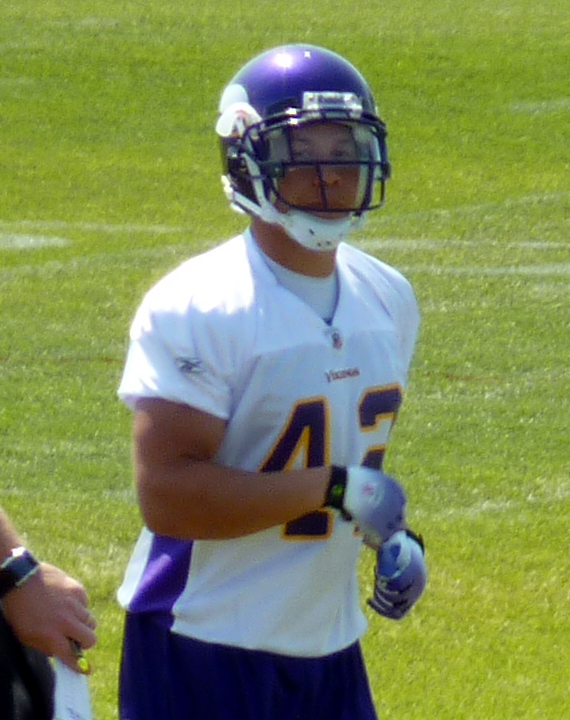
Johnson in 2009

Johnson ran the fastest 40-yard dash time for a running back at the 2009 NFL Combine with a 4.46. He was signed as a free agent with the Minnesota Vikings. In the fourth game of the preseason, Johnson ran for two touchdowns in 17 carries against the Dallas Cowboys. The following season, Johnson was waived by the Vikings on September 4, 2010. He was re-signed to the practice squad two days later.

The Arizona Cardinals signed Johnson to their practice squad on September 6, 2010, and he was released three weeks later on September 27.

The Detroit Lions signed Johnson to their practice squad on November 17, 2010. During the following season's training camp, he was released on September 3, 2011.

Johnson was signed to the San Francisco 49ers' practice squad on September 12, 2011, and later released on December 14, Johnson was signed to the Miami Dolphins' practice squad on December 29, 2011.

== Post-football career ==
Johnson is an insurance agent through State Farm in Boise. In November 2010, Johnson joined Kituku and Associates in Boise as a motivational speaker and personal coach. Johnson speaks at schools, businesses, churches, and associations on turning dreams to reality, winning as a team, making the right choices, and overcoming challenges. Johnson joined Boise radio station KNFL "ESPN Boise 730/96.5" in February 2014.

== Personal life ==
Following the 2007 Fiesta Bowl, during an interview with Chris Myers, Johnson proposed to his girlfriend Chrissy Popadics, Boise State's head cheerleader, on Fox Sports' postgame coverage. They married on July 28, 2007. According to Johnson, he received about 30 threatening letters, which he handed over to the FBI, from people who objected to his nationally televised marriage proposal. Johnson, who is black, and Popadics, who is white, hired security for their wedding due to the threats. Johnson and his wife have three daughters.

Johnson crocheted during his spare time while at Boise State, giving beanies away to teammates after being prohibited from selling them by the NCAA.

== See also ==
- List of NCAA Division I FBS running backs with at least 50 career rushing touchdowns
- List of NCAA major college football yearly rushing leaders
- List of NCAA major college football yearly scoring leaders
