= 2008 Minnesota Vikings season =

48th season in franchise history

- Owner: Zygi Wilf
- Head coach: Brad Childress
- Offensive coordinator: Darrell Bevell
- Defensive coordinator: Leslie Frazier
- Home stadium: Hubert H. Humphrey Metrodome

Results
- Record: 10–6
- Division place: 1st NFC North
- Playoffs: Lost Wild Card Playoffs (vs. Eagles) 14–26
- All-Pros: 5: RB Adrian Peterson (1st team); G Steve Hutchinson (1st team); DE Jared Allen (1st team); DT Kevin Williams (1st team); CB Antoine Winfield (2nd team)
- Pro Bowlers: 6: RB Adrian Peterson; G Steve Hutchinson; DE Jared Allen (bench); DT Kevin Williams; DT Pat Williams (bench); CB Antoine Winfield

Uniform
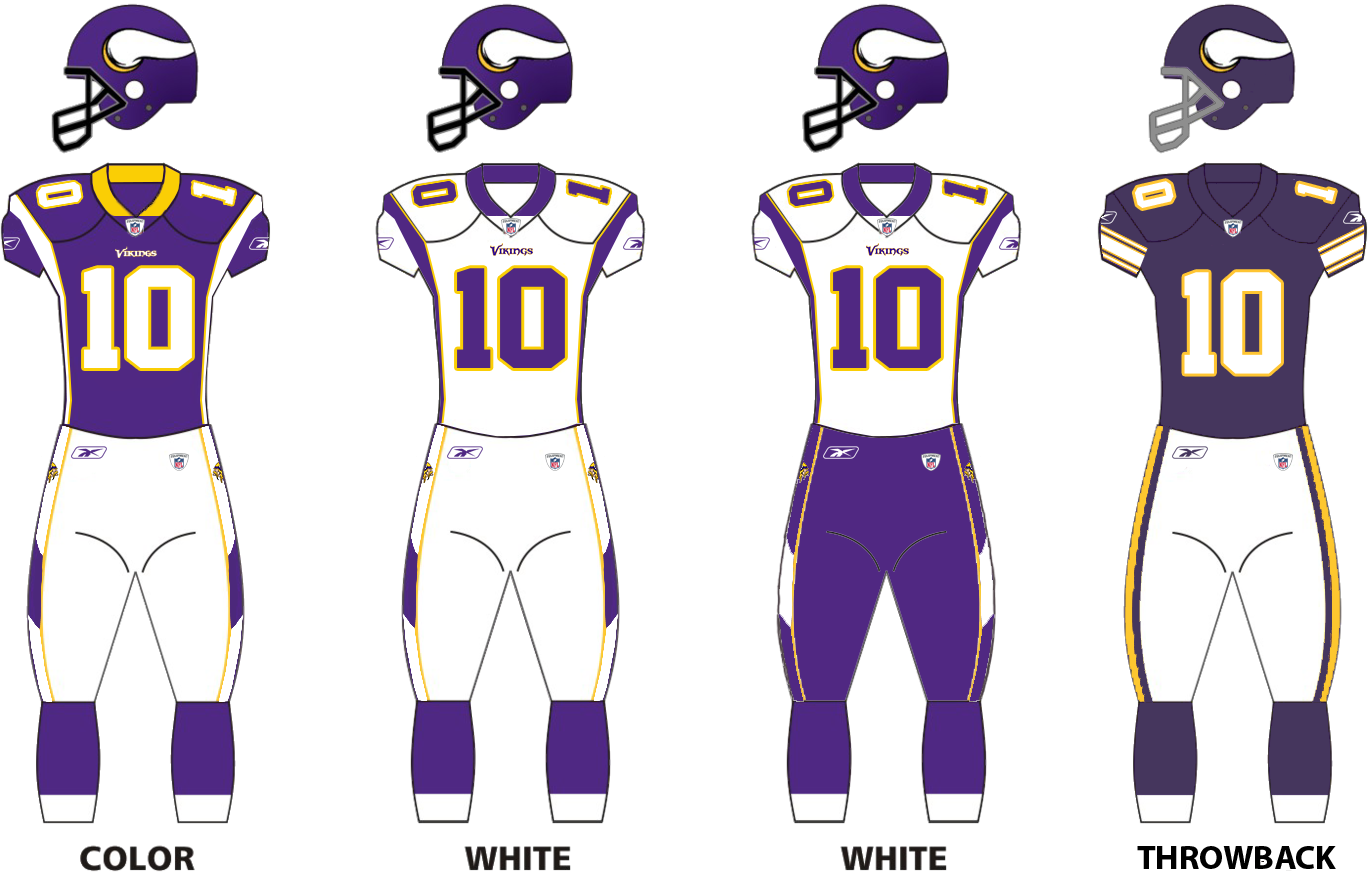

The 2008 season was the Minnesota Vikings' 48th in the National Football League (NFL) and their third under head coach Brad Childress. They won their 17th NFC North division title with a 10–6 record, the first time since 2000 that they made the playoffs with a winning record; however, they finished behind the New York Giants and Carolina Panthers and had to play in the wild card round of the playoffs. They were paired with Childress's former team, the Philadelphia Eagles, who won 26–14. Second-year running back Adrian Peterson led the league in rushing with 1,760 yards.

== Offseason ==
=== Player and personnel moves ===
==== Releases and injuries ====
On February 11, it was announced that defensive end Kenechi Udeze had been diagnosed by doctors with a form of leukemia. KMSP-TV also reported that Udeze was at Fairview Southdale Hospital undergoing tests and that he had been at the Mayo Clinic in Rochester the week before. Udeze was expected to be out for the 2008 season, but returned for one game against the Green Bay Packers on November 9 before ultimately retiring from professional football on July 29, 2009.

On February 20, the team released free safety Dwight Smith after two somewhat controversial seasons with the Vikings in which Smith had several run-ins with the law. He was due to receive $2.5 million and a $500,000 roster bonus this season.

On February 27, the team released backup quarterback Kelly Holcomb.

On February 29, the team traded wide receiver Troy Williamson to the Jacksonville Jaguars for a sixth-round pick in the 2008 draft and linebacker Dontarrious Thomas left the team to join the San Francisco 49ers.

On March 1, the Vikings' former defensive tackle Spencer Johnson joined the Buffalo Bills.

On March 3, free agent running back Mewelde Moore left the team to join the Pittsburgh Steelers.

On March 7, safety Tank Williams joined the New England Patriots and fullback Tony Richardson joined the New York Jets.

==== Signings and extensions ====
On February 29, the team signed safety Madieu Williams, formerly of the Cincinnati Bengals, and fullback Thomas Tapeh, formerly of the Philadelphia Eagles.

On March 1, the team signed wide receiver Bernard Berrian, formerly of the Chicago Bears.

On March 4, running back and special teams specialist Maurice Hicks, formerly of the San Francisco 49ers, signed a three-year contract to join the team.

On March 14, the team signed linebacker and special-teams standout Derrick Pope, formerly of the Miami Dolphins.

On March 17, the Vikings signed former Seattle Seahawks defensive tackle Ellis Wyms, and re-signed wide receiver Robert Ferguson; all to one-year contracts.

On March 20 and March 21, Houston Texans safety Michael Boulware and former Green Bay Packers career backup defensive tackle Kenderick Allen to one-year contracts.

On March 24, restricted free agent linebacker Heath Farwell was re-resigned to a one-year contract. Also, on the next day, the team signed former Kansas City Chiefs cornerback Benny Sapp to a one-year contract.

On April 8, former Vikings backup quarterback Gus Frerotte rejoined the team on a one-year contract.

On April 23, Kansas City Chiefs defensive end Jared Allen signed a six-year contract with the Vikings in a trade that gave the Chiefs the Vikings' 2008 first-round draft pick and both third-round picks. The trade may also involve the swapping of 2008 sixth round draft picks with Kansas City.

On July 22, the Vikings signed their fifth-round pick, defensive tackle Letroy Guion, and their seventh-round pick, wide receiver Jaymar Johnson.

=== 2008 draft ===
2008 Minnesota Vikings Draft
Draft order		Player name	Position	College	Contract	Notes
Round	Selection	Player name	Position	College	Contract	Notes
1	17	Traded to the Kansas City Chiefs (Note: The Vikings traded their first-, third- and sixth-round selections (17th, 82nd and 182nd overall), and the third-round selection they acquired from the Broncos (73rd overall) to the Chiefs in exchange for DE Jared Allen and a sixth-round selection (187th overall).)				
2	43	Tyrell Johnson	S	Arkansas State	4 years	From Panthers, via Eagles (Note: The Vikings traded their second- and fourth-round selections (47th and 117th overall) to the Eagles in exchange for second- and fifth-round selections (43rd and 152nd overall).)
2	47	Traded to the Philadelphia Eagles				
3	73	Traded to the Kansas City Chiefs				From Broncos (Note: The Vikings traded their 2007 fourth-round selection (121st overall) to the Broncos in exchange for Denver's 2007 sixth- and seventh-round selections (176th and 233rd overall), and 2008 third-round selection (73rd overall).)
3	82	Traded to the Kansas City Chiefs				
4	117	Traded to the Philadelphia Eagles				
5	137	John David Booty	QB	USC	4 years	From Rams, via Packers (Note: The Vikings traded their fifth- and seventh-round selections (150th and 209th overall) to the Packers in exchange for a fifth-round selection (137th overall).)
5	150	Traded to the Green Bay Packers				
5	152	Letroy Guion	DT	Florida State	4 years	From Eagles
6	182	Traded to the Kansas City Chiefs				
6	187	John Sullivan	C	Notre Dame	4 years	From Buccaneers, via Chiefs
6	193	Jaymar Johnson	WR	Jackson State	4 years	From Jaguars (Note: The Vikings traded WR Troy Williamson to the Jaguars in exchange for a sixth-round selection (193rd overall).)
7	209	Traded to the Green Bay Packers				From Rams (Note: The Vikings traded OT Adam Goldberg to the Rams in exchange for a seventh-round selection (209th overall).)
7	226	Traded to the New York Jets (Note: The Vikings traded their seventh-round selection (226th overall) and DT C. J. Mosley to the Jets in exchange for QB Brooks Bollinger.)				

Notes:

All selections were moved up one overall position as the New England Patriots forfeited their first-round pick (originally 31st overall) due to the "Spygate scandal".

Notable undrafted free agents
Name	Position	College
Husain Abdullah	S	Washington State
Stephen Hauschka	K	NC State
Erin Henderson	LB	Maryland
Darius Reynaud	WR	West Virginia

== Training camp ==
2008 Minnesota Vikings training camp in Mankato, Minnesota.

On May 27, Erasmus James was traded to the Washington Redskins for a conditional 2009 NFL draft pick.

On June 27, the Vikings signed a one-day contract with seven-season member Robert Griffith so he could ceremonially retire as a member of the team.

On July 16, Jay Glazer reported that the Green Bay Packers had filed tampering charges against the Vikings for allegedly inappropriately contacting Green Bay quarterback Brett Favre.

On August 4, NFL commissioner Roger Goodell ruled that contact between the Vikings and Brett Favre over the summer did not violate league tampering rules, as the Packers alleged, mostly because Favre was retired at the time.

== Staff ==
2008 Minnesota Vikings staff
Front office: Owner/chairman – Zygi Wilf; Owner/president – Mark Wilf; Owner/vice chairman – Leonard Wilf; Vice president of football operations – Rob Brzezinski; Vice president of player personnel – Rick Spielman; Director of player personnel – George Paton; Director of college scouting – Scott Studwell; Assistant director of college scouting – Jamaal Stephenson; Head coaches: Head coach – Brad Childress; Assistant to the head coach – Kevin Stefanski; Coaches administrative assistant – Todd Nielson; Offensive coaches: Offensive coordinator – Darrell Bevell; Quarterbacks – Kevin Rogers; Running backs – Eric Bieniemy; Assistant running backs – Ryan Ficken; Wide receivers – George Stewart; Assistant wide receivers/offensive assistant/assistant special teams – Chad O'Shea; Tight ends – Jimmie Johnson; Offensive line – Pat Morris; Assistant offensive line – Jim Hueber; Offensive assistant/defensive assistant – Ryan Silverfield	Defensive coaches: Defensive coordinator – Leslie Frazier; Defensive line – Karl Dunbar; Assistant defensive line – Brendan Daly; Linebackers – Fred Pagac; Defensive backs/secondary – Joe Woods; Assistant secondary – Derek Mason; Defensive assistant – Jeff Imamura; Special teams coaches: Special teams coordinator – Paul Ferraro; Assistant special teams – Brian Murphy; Strength and conditioning: Head athletic trainer/director of sports medicine – Eric Sugarman; Strength and conditioning – Tom Kanavy; Assistant strength and conditioning – Juney Barnett; Assistant strength and conditioning – Martin Streight

== Roster ==
2008 Minnesota Vikings roster
Quarterbacks (QB): 4 John David Booty; 12 Gus Frerotte; 7 Tarvaris Jackson; Running backs (RB): 43 Maurice Hicks KR; 45 Garrett Mills; 28 Adrian Peterson; 38 Naufahu Tahi FB; 29 Chester Taylor KR; Wide receivers (WR): 84 Aundrae Allison PR; 87 Bernard Berrian PR; 18 Sidney Rice; 82 Darius Reynaud; 19 Bobby Wade; Tight ends (TE): 83 Jeff Dugan; 40 Jim Kleinsasser; 81 Visanthe Shiancoe	Offensive linemen (OL): 78 Matt Birk C; 62 Ryan Cook T; 64 Anthony Herrera G; 79 Artis Hicks T; 76 Steve Hutchinson G; 72 Marcus Johnson T; 74 Bryant McKinnie T; 65 John Sullivan C; Defensive linemen (DL): 69 Jared Allen DE; 91 Ray Edwards DE; 90 Fred Evans DT; 73 Otis Grigsby DE; 98 Letroy Guion DT; 71 Jimmy Kennedy DT; 96 Brian Robison DE; 93 Kevin Williams DT; 94 Pat Williams DT; 97 Ellis Wyms DE/DT	Linebackers (LB): 54 Vinny Ciurciu; 52 Chad Greenway OLB; 99 Napoleon Harris MLB; 50 Erin Henderson OLB; 58 David Herron MLB; 51 Ben Leber OLB; 55 Dontarrious Thomas OLB; Defensive backs (DB): 39 Husain Abdullah SS; 37 Eric Frampton FS; 23 Cedric Griffin CB; 25 Tyrell Johnson FS; 21 Marcus McCauley CB; 22 Benny Sapp CB; 42 Darren Sharper SS; 20 Madieu Williams FS; 26 Antoine Winfield CB; Special teams (ST): 5 Chris Kluwe P; 46 Cullen Loeffler LS; 8 Ryan Longwell K	Practice squad: 61 Martail Burnett DE; 75 Chris Clark T; 63 Brian Daniels G; 11 Jaymar Johnson WR; -- Derrick Roberson CB; -- Roderick Rogers CB/S; 30 Marcus Walker CB; 34 Albert Young RB; Reserve: -- Kenderick Allen DT (IR); 27 Michael Boulware S (IR); 59 Heath Farwell LB (IR); 41 Charles Gordon (IR); 56 E. J. Henderson LB (IR); 92 Jayme Mitchell DE (IR); 60 Drew Radovich T (IR); 95 Kenechi Udeze DE (NF-Ill.); Rookies in italics 53 active, 8 reserve, 8 practice squad

== Preseason ==
=== Schedule ===
Week	Date	Opponent	Result	Record	Venue	NFL.com recap
1	August 8	Seattle Seahawks	L 17–34	0–1	Hubert H. Humphrey Metrodome	Recap
2	August 16	at Baltimore Ravens	W 23–15	1–1	M&T Bank Stadium	Recap
3	August 23	Pittsburgh Steelers	L 10–12	1–2	Hubert H. Humphrey Metrodome	Recap
4	August 28	at Dallas Cowboys	L 10–16	1–3	Texas Stadium	Recap

=== Game summaries ===
==== Week 1: vs. Seattle Seahawks ====
Preseason Week 1: Seattle Seahawks at Minnesota Vikings – Game summary

Quarter	1	2	3	4	Total
Seahawks	17	0	14	3	34
Vikings	7	10	0	0	17

at Hubert H. Humphrey Metrodome, Minneapolis, Minnesota

- Date: August 8
- Game time: 19:00
- Game weather: None (indoor stadium)
- Game attendance: 62,545
- Referee: John Parry (132)
- Recap, Game Book

Game information

First quarter

- SEA – Jordan Kent 18-yard pass from Matt Hasselbeck (Olindo Mare kick), 11:43. Seahawks 7–0. Drive: 7 plays, 76 yards, 3:17.
- SEA – Olindo Mare 21-yard field goal, 7:14. Seahawks 10–0. Drive: 6 plays, 40 yards, 3:20.
- MIN – Thomas Tapeh 6-yard pass from Tarvaris Jackson (Steven Hauschka kick), 5:52. Seahawks 10–7. Drive: 5 plays, 49 yards, 1:22.
- SEA – Jeb Putzier 15-yard pass from Seneca Wallace (Olindo Mare kick), 1:35. Seahawks 17–7. Drive: 8 plays, 71 yards, 4:17.

Second quarter

- MIN – Chester Taylor 1-yard run (Steven Hauschka kick), 12:31. Seahawks 17–14. Drive: 8 plays, 68 yards, 4:04.
- MIN – Steven Hauschka 35-yard field goal, 0:40. Tied 17–17. Drive: 10 plays, 42 yards, 4:15.

Third quarter

- SEA – Trent Shelton 7-yard pass from Seneca Wallace (Olindo Mare kick), 11:44. Seahawks 24–17. Drive: 5 plays, 32 yards, 2:20.
- SEA – Joel Filani 1-yard pass from Seneca Wallace (Olindo Mare kick), 4:45. Seahawks 31–17. Drive: 5 plays, 31 yards, 2:31.

Fourth quarter

- SEA – Olindo Mare 20-yard field goal, 12:17. Seahawks 34–17. Drive: 11 plays, 64 yards, 4:44.

Top passers

- SEA – Seneca Wallace – 15/20, 165 yards
- MIN – Tarvaris Jackson – 8/11, 118 yards

Top rushers

- SEA – Maurice Morris – 6 rushes, 62 yards
- MIN – Maurice Hicks – 7 rushes, 32 yards

Top receivers

- SEA – Michael Bumpus – 3 receptions, 51 yards
- MIN – Albert Young – 5 receptions, 52 yards

==== Week 2: at Baltimore Ravens ====
Preseason Week 2: Minnesota Vikings at Baltimore Ravens – Game summary

Quarter	1	2	3	4	Total
Vikings	7	13	3	0	23
Ravens	7	0	0	8	15

at M&T Bank Stadium, Baltimore, Maryland

- Date: August 16
- Game time: 18:30
- Game weather: Clear, 81 °F (27 °C)
- Game attendance: 70,585
- Referee: Jeff Triplette (42)
- Recap, Game Book

Game information

First quarter

- MIN – Martin Nance 23-yard pass from Tarvaris Jackson (Steven Hauschka kick), 10:24. Vikings 7–0. Drive: 11 plays, 70 yards, 4:36.
- BAL – Ray Rice 6-yard run (Matt Stover kick), 6:11. Tied 7–7. Drive: 7 plays, 73 yards, 4:13.

Second quarter

- MIN – Steven Hauschka 21-yard field goal, 14:58. Vikings 10–7. Drive: 14 plays, 74 yards, 6:13.
- MIN – Robert Ferguson 5-yard pass from Gus Frerotte (Steven Hauschka kick), 6:58. Vikings 17–7. Drive: 12 plays, 77 yards, 4:44.
- MIN – Steven Hauschka 34-yard field goal, 0:00. Vikings 20–7. Drive: 4 plays, −5 yards, 1:26.

Third quarter

- MIN – Steven Hauschka 48-yard field goal, 1:21. Vikings 23–7. Drive: 13 plays, 34 yards, 5:22.

Fourth quarter

- BAL – Derrick Martin 22-yard interception return (Cory Ross run), 12:11. Vikings 23–15.

Top passers

- MIN – Tarvaris Jackson – 7/11, 82 yards
- BAL – Joe Flacco – 10/15, 74 yards

Top rushers

- MIN – Albert Young – 12 rushes, 46 yards
- BAL – Ray Rice – 8 rushes, 77 yards

Top receivers

- MIN – Martin Nance – 3 receptions, 74 yards
- BAL – Ernie Wheelwright – 5 receptions, 37 yards

==== Week 3: vs. Pittsburgh Steelers ====
Preseason Week 3: Pittsburgh Steelers at Minnesota Vikings – Game summary

Quarter	1	2	3	4	Total
Steelers	0	3	3	6	12
Vikings	0	7	3	0	10

at Hubert H. Humphrey Metrodome, Minneapolis, Minnesota

- Date: August 23
- Game time: 19:00
- Game weather: None (indoor stadium)
- Game attendance: 62,625
- Referee: Carl Cheffers (51)
- Recap, Game Book

Game information

First quarter

- No scoring plays.

Second quarter

- MIN – Adrian Peterson 1-yard run (Ryan Longwell kick), 14:12. Vikings 7–0. Drive: 6 plays, 47 yards, 1:44.
- PIT – Jeff Reed 35-yard field goal, 6:40. Vikings 7–3. Drive: 9 plays, 18 yards, 4:06.

Third quarter

- MIN – Ryan Longwell 37-yard field goal, 10:06. Vikings 10–3. Drive: 11 plays, 60 yards, 4:54.
- PIT – Jeff Reed 43-yard field goal, 2:50. Vikings 10–6. Drive: 13 plays, 56 yards, 7:16.

Fourth quarter

- PIT – Jeff Reed 37-yard field goal, 10:02. Vikings 10–9. Drive: 13 plays, 63 yards, 5:50.
- PIT – Jeff Reed 47-yard field goal, 0:04. Steelers 12–9. Drive: 11 plays, 45 yards, 2:08.

Top passers

- PIT – Byron Leftwich – 16/23, 129 yards
- MIN – Gus Frerotte – 13/19, 133 yards

Top rushers

- PIT – Rashard Mendenhall – 15 rushes, 79 yards
- MIN – Adrian Peterson – 12 rushes, 21 yards

Top receivers

- PIT – Willie Reid – 5 receptions, 55 yards
- MIN – Aundrae Allison – 5 receptions, 56 yards

==== Week 4: at Dallas Cowboys ====
Preseason Week 4: Minnesota Vikings at Dallas Cowboys – Game summary

Quarter	1	2	3	4	Total
Vikings	0	7	3	0	10
Cowboys	10	3	0	3	16

at Texas Stadium, Irving, Texas

- Date: August 28
- Game time: 19:00
- Game weather: 95 °F (35 °C)
- Game attendance: 60,246
- Referee: Pete Morelli (135)
- Recap, Game Book

Game information

First quarter

- DAL – Nick Folk 23-yard field goal, 8:28. Cowboys 3–0. Drive: 12 plays, 73 yards, 6:32.
- DAL – Tashard Choice 11-yard run (Nick Folk kick), 6:59. Cowboys 10–0. Drive: 2 plays, 24 yards, 0:31.

Second quarter

- MIN – Maurice Hicks 1-yard run (Ryan Longwell kick), 14:07. Cowboys 10–7. Drive: 8 plays, 60 yards, 3:11.
- DAL – Nick Folk 52-yard field goal, 0:00. Cowboys 13–7. Drive: 5 plays, 32 yards, 0:38.

Third quarter

- MIN – Ryan Longwell 25-yard field goal, 10:22. Cowboys 13–10. Drive: 11 plays, 67 yards, 4:38.

Fourth quarter

- DAL – Nick Folk 52-yard field goal, 11:14. Cowboys 16–10. Drive: 15 plays, 59 yards, 7:33.

Top passers

- MIN – John David Booty – 8/15, 93 yards
- DAL – Richard Bartel – 29/42, 233 yards

Top rushers

- MIN – Albert Young – 14 rushes, 68 yards
- DAL – Sam Hurd – 1 rush, 35 yards

Top receivers

- MIN – Martin Nance – 2 receptions, 31 yards
- DAL – Mike Jefferson – 3 receptions, 36 yards

== Regular season ==
=== Schedule ===
Week	Date	Opponent	Result	Record	Venue	NFL.com recap
1	September 8	at Green Bay Packers	L 19–24	0–1	Lambeau Field	Recap
2	September 14	Indianapolis Colts	L 15–18	0–2	Hubert H. Humphrey Metrodome	Recap
3	September 21	Carolina Panthers	W 20–10	1–2	Hubert H. Humphrey Metrodome	Recap
4	September 28	at Tennessee Titans	L 17–30	1–3	LP Field	Recap
5	October 6	at New Orleans Saints	W 30–27	2–3	Louisiana Superdome	Recap
6	October 12	Detroit Lions	W 12–10	3–3	Hubert H. Humphrey Metrodome	Recap
7	October 19	at Chicago Bears	L 41–48	3–4	Soldier Field	Recap
8	Bye					
9	November 2	Houston Texans	W 28–21	4–4	Hubert H. Humphrey Metrodome	Recap
10	November 9	Green Bay Packers	W 28–27	5–4	Hubert H. Humphrey Metrodome	Recap
11	November 16	at Tampa Bay Buccaneers	L 13–19	5–5	Raymond James Stadium	Recap
12	November 23	at Jacksonville Jaguars	W 30–12	6–5	Jacksonville Municipal Stadium	Recap
13	November 30	Chicago Bears	W 34–14	7–5	Hubert H. Humphrey Metrodome	Recap
14	December 7	at Detroit Lions	W 20–16	8–5	Ford Field	Recap
15	December 14	at Arizona Cardinals	W 35–14	9–5	University of Phoenix Stadium	Recap
16	December 21	Atlanta Falcons	L 17–24	9–6	Hubert H. Humphrey Metrodome	Recap
17	December 28	New York Giants	W 20–19	10–6	Hubert H. Humphrey Metrodome	Recap

=== Game summaries ===
==== Week 1: at Green Bay Packers ====
Week 1: Minnesota Vikings at Green Bay Packers – Game summary

Quarter	1	2	3	4	Total
Vikings	0	3	3	13	19
Packers	0	10	7	7	24

at Lambeau Field, Green Bay, Wisconsin

- Date: September 8
- Game time: 6:00 p.m
- Game weather: Mostly cloudy, 58 °F (14 °C)
- Game attendance: 71,004
- Referee: Jeff Triplette (42)
- TV announcers (ESPN): Mike Tirico, Ron Jaworski, Tony Kornheiser and Michele Tafoya
- Recap, Game Book

Game information

First quarter

- No scoring plays.

Second quarter

- MIN – Ryan Longwell 37-yard field goal, 13:35. Vikings 3–0. Drive: 6 plays, 51 yards, 2:57.
- GB – Korey Hall 1-yard pass from Aaron Rodgers (Mason Crosby kick), 10:07. Packers 7–3. Drive: 5 plays, 62 yards, 3:28.
- GB – Mason Crosby 42-yard field goal, 3:21. Packers 10–3. Drive: 8 plays, 63 yards, 4:15.

Third quarter

- MIN – Ryan Longwell 27-yard field goal, 10:52. Packers 10–6. Drive: 9 plays, 77 yards, 4:08.
- GB – Will Blackmon 76-yard punt return (Mason Crosby kick), 6:35. Packers 17–6.

Fourth quarter

- MIN – Sidney Rice 23-yard pass from Tarvaris Jackson (pass failed), 14:12. Packers 17–12. Drive: 15 plays, 79 yards, 7:23.
- GB – Aaron Rodgers 1-yard run (Mason Crosby kick), 6:03. Packers 24–12. Drive: 4 plays, 77 yards, 2:31.
- MIN – Adrian Peterson 3-yard run (Ryan Longwell kick), 2:39. Packers 24–19. Drive: 11 plays, 80 yards, 3:24.

Top passers

- MIN – Tarvaris Jackson – 16/35, 178 yards
- GB – Aaron Rodgers – 18/22, 178 yards

Top rushers

- MIN – Adrian Peterson – 19 rushes, 103 yards
- GB – Ryan Grant – 12 rushes, 92 yards

Top receivers

- MIN – Garrett Mills – 3 receptions, 49 yards
- GB – Greg Jennings – 5 receptions, 91 yards

The Vikings began their 2008 campaign on the road against their NFC North foe, the Green Bay Packers, in the first game of 2008's Monday Night Football doubleheader. After a scoreless first quarter, the Vikings attacked first with kicker Ryan Longwell getting a 37-yard field goal. The Packers responded with quarterback Aaron Rodgers completing a 1-yard touchdown pass to fullback Korey Hall, along with kicker Mason Crosby getting a 42-yard field goal. In the third quarter, the Vikes tried to catch up as Longwell got a 27-yard field goal, but Green Bay replied with cornerback Will Blackmon returning a punt 76 yards for a touchdown. In the fourth quarter, Minnesota tried to rally as quarterback Tarvaris Jackson completed a 23-yard touchdown pass to wide receiver Sidney Rice (with a failed two-point conversion), yet the Packers responded with Rodgers getting a 1-yard touchdown run. The Vikes replied with a 3-yard touchdown run from running back Adrian Peterson, but their final rally ended in an interception.

With the loss, not only did the Vikings begin their season at 0–1, but head coach Brad Childress fell to 0–5 against the Packers in his coaching career. In the first half, Minnesota was widely outgained in passing yards 139–6.

==== Week 2: vs. Indianapolis Colts ====
Week 2: Indianapolis Colts at Minnesota Vikings – Game summary

Quarter	1	2	3	4	Total
Colts	0	0	7	11	18
Vikings	6	3	6	0	15

at Hubert H. Humphrey Metrodome, Minneapolis, Minnesota

- Date: September 14
- Game time: 1:00 p.m.
- Game weather: None (indoor stadium)
- Game attendance: 63,585
- Referee: Gene Steratore (114)
- TV announcers (CBS): Greg Gumbel and Dan Dierdorf
- Recap, Game Book

Game information

First quarter

- MIN – Ryan Longwell 45-yard field goal, 10:10. Vikings 3–0. Drive: 6 plays, 31 yards, 2:14.
- MIN – Ryan Longwell 27-yard field goal, 0:09. Vikings 6–0. Drive: 8 plays, 43 yards, 3:56.

Second quarter

- MIN – Ryan Longwell 53-yard field goal, 0:00. Vikings 9–0. Drive: 3 plays, 45 yards, 0:21.

Third quarter

- MIN – Ryan Longwell 46-yard field goal, 10:38. Vikings 12–0. Drive: 8 plays, 34 yards, 4:22.
- MIN – Ryan Longwell 28-yard field goal, 4:09. Vikings 15–0. Drive: 8 plays, 36 yards, 3:31.
- IND – Joseph Addai 1-yard run (Adam Vinatieri kick), 1:24. Vikings 15–7. Drive: 6 plays, 80 yards, 2:45.

Fourth quarter

- IND – Reggie Wayne 32-yard pass from Peyton Manning (Dominic Rhodes run), 5:54. Tied 15–15. Drive: 3 plays, 61 yards, 1:15.
- IND – Adam Vinatieri 47-yard field goal, 0:03. Colts 18–15. Drive: 5 plays, 21 yards, 1:04.

Top passers

- IND – Peyton Manning – 26/42, 311 yards, TD, 2 INT
- MIN – Tarvaris Jackson – 14/24, 130 yards

Top rushers

- IND – Joseph Addai – 15 rushes, 20 yards, TD
- MIN – Adrian Peterson – 29 rushes, 160 yards

Top receivers

- IND – Anthony Gonzalez – 9 receptions, 137 yards
- MIN – Bobby Wade – 3 receptions, 42 yards

Hoping to rebound from their divisional road loss to the Packers, the Vikings played their Week 2 home opener against the Indianapolis Colts. In the first half, kicker Ryan Longwell helped Minnesota take the early lead with a 45-yard and a 27-yard field goal in the first quarter, along with a 53-yard field goal in the second quarter. In the third quarter, the Vikes increased its lead with Longwell getting a 46-yard and a 28-yard field goal. However, the Colts responded with running back Joseph Addai getting a 1-yard touchdown run. In the fourth quarter, Indianapolis continued to gain ground as quarterback Peyton Manning completed a 32-yard touchdown pass to wide receiver Reggie Wayne, followed by a two-point conversion run by running back Dominic Rhodes. The Colts sealed the win with a 47-yard field goal from kicker Adam Vinatieri with 3 seconds left in regulation.

==== Week 3: vs. Carolina Panthers ====
Week 3: Carolina Panthers at Minnesota Vikings – Game summary

Quarter	1	2	3	4	Total
Panthers	3	7	0	0	10
Vikings	0	10	7	3	20

at Hubert H. Humphrey Metrodome, Minneapolis, Minnesota

- Date: September 21
- Game time: 12:00 p.m.
- Game weather: None (indoor stadium)
- Game attendance: 62,628
- Referee: John Parry
- TV announcers (Fox): Ron Pitts, Tony Boselli and Charissa Thompson
- Recap, Game Book

Game information

First quarter

- CAR – John Kasay 43-yard field goal, 12:53. Panthers 3–0. Drive: 5 plays, 37 yards, 2:07.

Second quarter

- CAR – Jonathan Stewart 2-yard run (John Kasay kick), 9:55. Panthers 10–0. Drive: 11 plays, 84 yards, 5:48.
- MIN – Ryan Longwell 28-yard field goal, 1:46. Panthers 10–3. Drive: 15 plays, 69 yards, 8:09.
- MIN – Antoine Winfield 19-yard fumble return (Ryan Longwell kick), 1:04. Tied 10–10.

Third quarter

- MIN – Visanthe Shiancoe 34-yard pass from Gus Frerotte (Ryan Longwell kick), 12:53. Vikings 17–10. Drive: 5 plays, 80 yards, 2:07.

Fourth quarter

- MIN – Ryan Longwell 32-yard field goal, 9:07. Vikings 20–10. Drive: 19 plays, 75 yards, 11:34.

Top passers

- CAR – Jake Delhomme – 17/29, 191 yards
- MIN – Gus Frerotte – 16/28, 204 yards, TD, INT

Top rushers

- CAR – DeAngelo Williams – 10 rushes, 27 yards
- MIN – Adrian Peterson – 17 rushes, 77 yards

Top receivers

- CAR – Steve Smith Sr. – 4 receptions, 70 yards
- MIN – Bernard Berrian – 3 receptions, 79 yards

Trying to avoid an 0–3 start, the Vikings stayed at home for a Week 3 duel with the Carolina Panthers. Due to poor performance, Jackson was benched at quarterback in favor of veteran Gus Frerotte.

In the first quarter, Minnesota trailed early as Panthers kicker John Kasay got a 43-yard field goal. In the second quarter, Carolina increased its lead with running back Jonathan Stewart getting a 2-yard touchdown run. The Vikes responded with a 28-yard field goal by Longwell, followed by cornerback Antoine Winfield sacking Panthers quarterback Jake Delhomme, who fumbled the ball, which Winfield returned 19 yards for a touchdown just before halftime, the key play in the Vikings' victory. Head coach Brad Childress said a day later that Winfield had a half-second left before it was ruled an incomplete pass. In the third quarter, the Vikings got the lead as Frerotte completed a 34-yard touchdown pass to tight end Visanthe Shiancoe. In the fourth quarter, Minnesota sealed its victory with Longwell nailing a 32-yard field goal.

==== Week 4: at Tennessee Titans ====
Week 4: Minnesota Vikings at Tennessee Titans – Game summary

Quarter	1	2	3	4	Total
Vikings	0	10	0	7	17
Titans	10	10	3	7	30

at LP Field, Nashville, Tennessee

- Date: September 28
- Game time: 12:00 p.m.
- Game weather: Sunny, 78 °F (26 °C)
- Game attendance: 69,143
- Referee: Peter Morelli
- TV announcers (Fox): Chris Myers, J. C. Pearson and Nischelle Turner
- Recap, Game Book

Game information

First quarter

- TEN – Rob Bironas 20-yard field goal, 10:04. Titans 3–0. Drive: 11 plays, 74 yards, 4:56.
- TEN – Chris Johnson 1-yard run (Rob Bironas kick), 4:05. Titans 10–0. Drive: 9 plays, 33 yards, 4:38.

Second quarter

- MIN – Adrian Peterson 28-yard run (Ryan Longwell kick), 14:53. Titans 10–7. Drive: 10 plays, 80 yards, 4:12.
- TEN – Rob Bironas 32-yard field goal, 10:19. Titans 13–7. Drive: 8 plays, 58 yards, 4:34.
- TEN – LenDale White 1-yard run (Rob Bironas kick), 3:42. Titans 20–7. Drive: 5 plays, 11 yards, 1:46.
- MIN – Ryan Longwell 42-yard field goal, 0:48. Titans 20–10. Drive: 11 plays, 43 yards, 2:54.

Third quarter

- TEN – Rob Bironas 49-yard field goal, 6:54. Titans 23–10. Drive: 7 plays, 33 yards, 2:45.

Fourth quarter

- MIN – Adrian Peterson 3-yard run (Ryan Longwell kick), 6:00. Titans 23–17. Drive: 11 plays, 79 yards, 4:13.
- TEN – Chris Johnson 6-yard run (Rob Bironas kick), 3:40. Titans 30–17. Drive: 1 play, 6 yards, 0:06.

Top passers

- MIN – Gus Frerotte – 25/43, 266 yards, INT
- TEN – Kerry Collins – 18/35, 199 yards

Top rushers

- MIN – Adrian Peterson – 18 rushes, 80 yards, 2 TD
- TEN – Chris Johnson – 17 rushes, 61 yards, 2 TD

Top receivers

- MIN – Bernard Berrian – 5 receptions, 78 yards
- TEN – Justin Gage – 5 receptions, 92 yards

Coming off their home win over the Panthers, the Vikings flew to LP Field for a Week 4 interconference duel with the Tennessee Titans. In the first quarter, Minnesota trailed early as Titans kicker Rob Bironas got a 20-yard field goal, while running back Chris Johnson got a 1-yard touchdown run. In the second quarter, the Vikes responded with a 28-yard touchdown run from Peterson. However, Tennessee responded with Bironas kicking a 32-yard field goal, along with running back LenDale White getting a 1-yard touchdown run. The Vikings closed out the half with Longwell getting a 42-yard field goal.

In the third quarter, the Titans increased their lead with Bironas nailing a 49-yard field goal. In the fourth quarter, Minnesota tried to rally as Peterson got a 3-yard touchdown run, but Tennessee pulled away with Johnson's 6-yard touchdown run.

With the loss, the Vikings fell to 1–3.

==== Week 5: at New Orleans Saints ====
Week 5: Minnesota Vikings at New Orleans Saints – Game summary

Quarter	1	2	3	4	Total
Vikings	10	10	0	10	30
Saints	10	0	7	10	27

at Louisiana Superdome, New Orleans, Louisiana

- Date: October 6
- Game time: 7:30 p.m.
- Game weather: None (indoor stadium)
- Game attendance: 70,015
- Referee: Ed Hochuli
- TV announcers (ESPN): Mike Tirico, Ron Jaworski, Tony Kornheiser, Michele Tafoya and Suzy Kolber
- Recap, Game Book

Game information

First quarter

- NO – Devery Henderson 17-yard pass from Drew Brees (Martín Gramática kick), 11:09. Saints 7–0. Drive: 8 plays, 47 yards, 3:51.
- MIN – Antoine Winfield 59-yard return of blocked field goal (Ryan Longwell kick), 6:20. Tied 7–7.
- NO – Martín Gramática 35-yard field goal, 2:58. Saints 10–7. Drive: 8 plays, 34 yards, 3:22.
- MIN – Ryan Longwell 53-yard field goal, 0:53. Tied 10–10. Drive: 4 plays, 4 yards, 2:05.

Second quarter

- MIN – Visanthe Shiancoe 4-yard pass from Chester Taylor (Ryan Longwell kick), 13:19. Vikings 17–10. Drive: 3 plays, 5 yards, 1:32.
- MIN – Ryan Longwell 33-yard field goal, 0:04. Vikings 20–10. Drive: 15 plays, 72 yards, 3:20.

Third quarter

- NO – Reggie Bush 71-yard punt return (Martín Gramática kick), 1:46. Vikings 20–17.

Fourth quarter

- NO – Martín Gramática 53-yard field goal, 13:20. Tied 20–20. Drive: 6 plays, 14 yards, 1:40.
- NO – Reggie Bush 64-yard punt return (Martín Gramática kick), 11:36. Saints 27–20.
- MIN – Bernard Berrian 33-yard pass from Gus Frerotte (Ryan Longwell kick), 7:10. Tied 27–27. Drive: 7 plays, 75 yards, 4:26.
- MIN – Ryan Longwell 30-yard field goal, 0:13. Vikings 30–27. Drive: 6 plays, 51 yards, 1:45.

Top passers

- MIN – Gus Frerotte – 19/36, 222 yards, TD
- NO – Drew Brees – 26/46, 330 yards, TD, 2 INT

Top rushers

- MIN – Adrian Peterson – 21 rushes, 32 yards
- NO – Reggie Bush – 12 rushes, 29 yards

Top receivers

- MIN – Bernard Berrian – 6 receptions, 110 yards, TD
- NO – Devery Henderson – 4 receptions, 104 yards, TD

Hoping to rebound from their road loss to the Titans, the Vikings flew to the Louisiana Superdome for a Week 5 Monday night duel with the New Orleans Saints. Frerotte made his first start on Monday Night Football since 1997, when he was with the Washington Redskins.

In the first quarter, the Vikes trailed early as Saints quarterback Drew Brees completed a 17-yard touchdown pass to wide receiver Devery Henderson. Minnesota responded with Winfield returning a blocked field goal 59 yards for a touchdown, the first such score in franchise history. New Orleans answered with kicker Martín Gramática getting a 35-yard field goal, yet the Vikings replied with Longwell getting a 53-yard field goal. In the second quarter, the Vikes took the lead on a trick play as running back Chester Taylor completed a 4-yard touchdown pass to Shiancoe, along with Longwell kicking a 33-yard field goal.

In the third quarter, the Saints began to rally as running back Reggie Bush returned a punt 71 yards for a touchdown. In the fourth quarter, New Orleans took the lead with Gramática's 53-yard field goal and Bush's 64-yard punt return for a touchdown. Afterwards, Minnesota answered with Frerotte completing a 33-yard touchdown pass to wide receiver Bernard Berrian, along with Longwell nailing the game-winning 30-yard field goal.

With the win, the Vikings improved to 2–3.

Winfield had a big game. In addition to his touchdown off of a blocked field goal, he had 8 tackles and a sack (with a forced fumble recovery).

This was also the first time in NFL history that a game had a combination of a blocked field goal, a touchdown pass by a non-quarterback, two field goals of 50+ yards, and two punts returned for touchdowns.

==== Week 6: vs. Detroit Lions ====
Week 6: Detroit Lions at Minnesota Vikings – Game summary

Quarter	1	2	3	4	Total
Lions	0	3	7	0	10
Vikings	2	0	7	3	12

at Hubert H. Humphrey Metrodome, Minneapolis, Minnesota

- Date: October 12
- Game time: 12:00 p.m.
- Game weather: None (indoor stadium)
- Game attendance: 62,867
- Referee: Tony Corrente
- TV announcers (Fox): Ron Pitts, Tony Boselli and Laura Okmin
- Recap, Game Book

Game information

First quarter

- MIN – Dan Orlovsky sacked out of bounds in the end zone by Jared Allen for a safety, 0:18. Vikings 2–0.

Second quarter

- DET – Jason Hanson 40-yard field goal, 1:56. Lions 3–2. Drive: 6 plays, 48 yards, 3:02.

Third quarter

- DET – Calvin Johnson 12-yard pass from Dan Orlovsky (Jason Hanson kick), 8:22. Lions 10–2. Drive: 10 plays, 69 yards, 6:38.
- MIN – Bernard Berrian 86-yard pass from Gus Frerotte (Ryan Longwell kick), 4:33. Lions 10–9. Drive: 1 play, 86 yards, 0:14.

Fourth quarter

- MIN – Ryan Longwell 26-yard field goal, 0:09. Vikings 12–10. Drive: 10 plays, 71 yards, 4:32.

Top passers

- DET – Dan Orlovsky – 12/21, 150 yards, TD
- MIN – Gus Frerotte – 18/33, 296 yards, TD, INT

Top rushers

- DET – Kevin Smith – 5 rushes, 62 yards
- MIN – Adrian Peterson – 25 rushes, 111 yards

Top receivers

- DET – Calvin Johnson – 4 receptions, 85 yards, TD
- MIN – Bernard Berrian – 5 receptions, 131 yards, TD

Coming off their Monday night road win over the Saints, the Vikings went home for a Week 6 NFC North duel with the Detroit Lions. In the first quarter, the Vikings got an early lead as Lions quarterback Dan Orlovsky unintentionally ran out of the back of his own end zone, giving Minnesota a safety. In the second quarter, Detroit got the lead as kicker Jason Hanson made a 40-yard field goal. In the third quarter, the Lions increased their lead as Orlovsky completed a 12-yard touchdown pass to wide receiver Calvin Johnson. The Vikings answered with an 86-yard touchdown pass from Frerotte to Berrian. In the end of the fourth quarter, the Vikings got in field goal range due to a controversial pass interference call on Leigh Bodden. The Vikings sealed the win with Longwell nailing the game-winning 26-yard field goal.

With the win, the Vikings improved to 3–3.

==== Week 7: at Chicago Bears ====
Week 7: Minnesota Vikings at Chicago Bears – Game summary

Quarter	1	2	3	4	Total
Vikings	14	10	7	10	41
Bears	14	13	14	7	48

at Soldier Field, Chicago, Illinois

- Date: October 19
- Game time: 12:00 p.m.
- Game weather: Partly cloudy, 58 °F (14 °C)
- Game attendance: 62,235
- Referee: Carl Cheffers
- TV announcers (Fox): Sam Rosen, Tim Ryan and Charissa Thompson
- Recap, Game Book

Game information

First quarter

- MIN – Adrian Peterson 1-yard run (Ryan Longwell kick), 9:18. Vikings 7–0. Drive: 10 plays, 67 yards, 5:42.
- CHI – Greg Olsen 18-yard pass from Kyle Orton (Robbie Gould kick), 6:43. Tied 7–7. Drive: 5 plays, 54 yards, 2:35.
- CHI – Garrett Wolfe 17-yard return of blocked punt (Robbie Gould kick), 5:43. Bears 14–7.
- MIN – Visanthe Shiancoe 24-yard pass from Gus Frerotte (Ryan Longwell kick), 2:18. Tied 14–14. Drive: 6 plays, 70 yards, 3:25.

Second quarter

- CHI – Robbie Gould 26-yard field goal, 13:33. Bears 17–14. Drive: 9 plays, 44 yards, 3:45.
- MIN – Ryan Longwell 42-yard field goal, 9:10. Tied 17–17. Drive: 8 plays, 42 yards, 4:23.
- CHI – Zack Bowman fumble recovery in the end zone (Robbie Gould kick), 4:58. Bears 24–17.
- MIN – Chester Taylor 1-yard run (Ryan Longwell kick), 0:22. Tied 24–24. Drive: 7 plays, 68 yards, 3:25.
- CHI – Robbie Gould 48-yard field goal, 0:00. Bears 27–24. Drive: 3 plays, 28 yards, 0:22.

Third quarter

- CHI – Rashied Davis fumble recovery in the end zone (Robbie Gould kick), 12:12. Bears 34–24.
- MIN – Adrian Peterson 54-yard run (Ryan Longwell kick), 10:40. Bears 34–31. Drive: 4 plays, 64 yards, 1:32.
- CHI – Marty Booker 51-yard pass from Kyle Orton (Robbie Gould kick), 2:35. Bears 41–31. Drive: 4 plays, 63 yards, 1:31.

Fourth quarter

- CHI – Matt Forte 1-yard run (Robbie Gould kick), 14:53. Bears 48–31. Drive: 4 plays, 6 yards, 0:57.
- MIN – Ryan Longwell 23-yard field goal, 8:59. Bears 48–34. Drive: 12 plays, 63 yards, 5:54.
- MIN – Bernard Berrian 5-yard pass from Gus Frerotte (Ryan Longwell kick), 3:00. Bears 48–41. Drive: 13 plays, 75 yards, 4:11.

Top passers

- MIN – Gus Frerotte – 25/40, 298 yards, 2 TD, 4 INT
- CHI – Kyle Orton – 21/32, 283 yards, 2 TD

Top rushers

- MIN – Adrian Peterson – 22 rushes, 121 yards, 2 TD
- CHI – Matt Forte – 20 rushes, 56 yards, TD

Top receivers

- MIN – Bernard Berrian – 6 receptions, 81 yards, TD
- CHI – Marty Booker – 3 receptions, 79 yards, TD

Coming off their divisional home win over the Lions, the Vikings flew to Soldier Field for a Week 7 NFC North duel with the Chicago Bears. In the first quarter, the Vikes drew first blood as Peterson got a 1-yard touchdown run. The Bears responded with quarterback Kyle Orton completing an 18-yard touchdown pass to tight end Greg Olsen, along with running back Garrett Wolfe returning a blocked punt 17 yards for a touchdown. Minnesota responded with a 24-yard touchdown pass from Frerotte to Shiancoe. In the second quarter, it was back and forth. Chicago kicker Robbie Gould kicked a 26-yard field goal, while Longwell got a 42-yard field goal for the Vikings. Bears cornerback Zack Bowman recovered a fumble in Minnesota's endzone for a touchdown, but the Vikings canceled it out on a 1-yard touchdown run by Taylor. Chicago closed out the half as Gould got a 48-yard field goal.

In the third quarter, the Bears got the lead again as wide receiver Rashied Davis recovered a fumble in Minnesota's endzone for a touchdown. The Vikes replied as Peterson got a 54-yard touchdown run. Chicago then struck again, as Orton completed a 51-yard touchdown pass to wide receiver Marty Booker. In the fourth quarter, the Bears struck again as running back Matt Forte got a 1-yard touchdown run. Minnesota tried to rally as Longwell nailed a 23-yard field goal, along with Frerotte completing a 5-yard touchdown pass to Berrian. However, Chicago's defense stepped up and prevented the Vikes from tying the game, intercepting Frerotte one more time.

With the loss, the Vikings went into their bye week at 3–4.

The 89 combined points is the most in a single game in the history of both franchises.

==== Week 9: vs. Houston Texans ====
Week 9: Houston Texans at Minnesota Vikings – Game summary

Quarter	1	2	3	4	Total
Texans	7	0	7	7	21
Vikings	7	14	0	7	28

at Hubert H. Humphrey Metrodome, Minneapolis, Minnesota

- Date: November 2
- Game time: 12:00 p.m.
- Game weather: None (indoor stadium)
- Game attendance: 62,839
- Referee: Walt Coleman
- TV announcers (CBS): Dick Enberg and Randy Cross
- Recap, Game Book

Game information

First quarter

- MIN – Adrian Peterson 1-yard run (Ryan Longwell kick), 12:48. Vikings 7–0. Drive: 4 plays, 66 yards, 2:12.
- HOU – Jacques Reeves 44-yard interception return (Kris Brown kick), 8:38. Tied 7–7.

Second quarter

- MIN – Sidney Rice 8-yard pass from Gus Frerotte (Ryan Longwell kick), 14:07. Vikings 14–7. Drive: 13 plays, 47 yards, 5:59.
- MIN – Bernard Berrian 49-yard pass from Gus Frerotte (Ryan Longwell kick), 6:09. Vikings 21–7. Drive: 3 plays, 56 yards, 1:35.

Third quarter

- HOU – David Anderson 3-yard pass from Sage Rosenfels (Kris Brown kick), 9:28. Vikings 21–14. Drive: 10 plays, 72 yards, 5:32.

Fourth quarter

- MIN – Visanthe Shiancoe 25-yard pass from Gus Frerotte (Ryan Longwell kick), 6:26. Vikings 28–14. Drive: 7 plays, 84 yards, 3:25.
- HOU – Andre Johnson 14-yard pass from Sage Rosenfels (Kris Brown kick), 2:58. Vikings 28–21. Drive: 10 plays, 67 yards, 3:28.

Top passers

- HOU – Sage Rosenfels – 21/29, 224 yards, 2 TD, INT
- MIN – Gus Frerotte – 11/18, 182 yards, 3 TD, INT

Top rushers

- HOU – Steve Slaton – 16 rushes, 62 yards
- MIN – Adrian Peterson – 25 rushes, 139 yards, TD

Top receivers

- HOU – Owen Daniels – 11 receptions, 133 yards
- MIN – Bernard Berrian – 2 receptions, 104 yards, TD

Coming off their bye week, the Vikings played a Week 9 interconference duel at home against the Houston Texans. In the first quarter, the Vikes drew first blood as Peterson got a 1-yard touchdown run. The Texans responded with cornerback Jacques Reeves returning an interception 44 yards for a touchdown. In the second quarter, Minnesota responded with a pair of touchdown passes from Frerotte: first, an 8-yard pass to Rice and then a 49-yard pass to Berrian.

In the third quarter, Houston started to rally as quarterback Sage Rosenfels completed a 3-yard touchdown pass to wide receiver David Anderson. In the fourth quarter, the Vikings answered with Frerotte completing a 25-yard touchdown pass to Shiancoe. The Texans tried to come back as Rosenfels completed a 14-yard touchdown pass to wide receiver Andre Johnson. Fortunately, Minnesota's defense stiffened for the victory.

With the win, the Vikings improved to 4–4.

==== Week 10: vs. Green Bay Packers ====
Week 10: Green Bay Packers at Minnesota Vikings – Game summary

Quarter	1	2	3	4	Total
Packers	7	3	14	3	27
Vikings	7	7	7	7	28

at Hubert H. Humphrey Metrodome, Minneapolis, Minnesota

- Date: November 9
- Game time: 12:00 p.m.
- Game weather: None (indoor stadium)
- Game attendance: 63,845
- Referee: Alberto Riveron
- TV announcers (Fox): Joe Buck, Troy Aikman and Pam Oliver
- Recap, Game Book

Game information

First quarter

- MIN – Sidney Rice 3-yard pass from Gus Frerotte (Ryan Longwell kick), 9:01. Vikings 7–0. Drive: 9 plays, 39 yards, 4:06.
- GB – Ryan Grant 1-yard run (Mason Crosby kick), 4:01. Tied 7–7. Drive: 6 plays, 48 yards, 3:15.

Second quarter

- MIN – Ryan Longwell 54-yard field goal, 12:56. Vikings 10–7. Drive: 11 plays, 43 yards, 6:05.
- MIN – Penalty on Aaron Rodgers enforced in the end zone for a safety, 12:22. Vikings 12–7.
- MIN – Aaron Rodgers sacked in the end zone by Jared Allen for a safety, 0:44. Vikings 14–7.
- GB – Mason Crosby 47-yard field goal, 0:00. Vikings 14–10. Drive: 3 plays, 11 yards, 0:22.

Third quarter

- MIN – Chester Taylor 47-yard pass from Gus Frerotte (Ryan Longwell kick), 10:31. Vikings 21–10. Drive: 8 plays, 77 yards, 4:29.
- GB – Nick Collins 59-yard interception return (Mason Crosby kick), 5:21. Vikings 21–17.
- GB – Will Blackmon 65-yard punt return (Mason Crosby kick), 3:09. Packers 24–21.

Fourth quarter

- GB – Mason Crosby 40-yard field goal, 5:56. Packers 27–21. Drive: 5 plays, 19 yards, 3:02.
- MIN – Adrian Peterson 29-yard run (Ryan Longwell kick), 2:22. Vikings 28–27. Drive: 7 plays, 69 yards, 3:34.

Top passers

- GB – Aaron Rodgers – 15/26, 142 yards
- MIN – Gus Frerotte – 15/28, 151 yards, 2 TD, 3 INT

Top rushers

- GB – Ryan Grant – 16 rushes, 75 yards, TD
- MIN – Adrian Peterson – 30 rushes, 192 yards, TD

Top receivers

- GB – Donald Driver – 5 receptions, 46 yards
- MIN – Chester Taylor – 4 receptions, 84 yards, TD

Coming off their win over the Texans, the Vikings stayed at home for a Week 10 NFC North rematch with the Green Bay Packers. In the first quarter, the Vikes drew first blood as Frerotte completed a 3-yard touchdown pass to Rice. The Packers responded with running back Ryan Grant getting a 1-yard touchdown run. In the second quarter, Minnesota increased their lead with former Packer Ryan Longwell kicking a 54-yard field goal, along with the Vikings picking up back-to-back safeties: first Aaron Rodgers gave away an intentional grounding penalty in his own endzone, before Vikings defensive end Jared Allen sacked Rodgers in his own endzone for the second. Green Bay closed out the half with Crosby getting a 47-yard field goal.

In the third quarter, the Vikes increased their lead as Frerotte completed a 47-yard touchdown pass to Taylor. However, the Packers took the lead as safety Nick Collins returned an interception 59 yards for a touchdown, before Blackmon scored his second punt return touchdown of the season against the Vikings, returning one 65 yards. In the fourth quarter, the Packers increased their lead as Crosby nailed a 40-yard field goal. The Vikings regained the lead as Peterson got a 29-yard touchdown run. Green Bay did manage to get a late drive going, yet Crosby's 52-yard field goal attempt sailed wide right, preserving head coach Brad Childress's first win over the Packers.

With the win, the Vikings improved to 5–4.

==== Week 11: at Tampa Bay Buccaneers ====
Week 11: Minnesota Vikings at Tampa Bay Buccaneers – Game summary

Quarter	1	2	3	4	Total
Vikings	3	10	0	0	13
Buccaneers	3	3	7	6	19

at Raymond James Stadium, Tampa, Florida

- Date: November 16
- Game time: 12:00 p.m.
- Game weather: Sunny, 62 °F (17 °C)
- Game attendance: 65,278
- Referee: Mike Carey
- TV announcers (Fox): Sam Rosen, Tim Ryan and Chris Myers
- Recap, Game Book

Game information

First quarter

- MIN – Ryan Longwell 43-yard field goal, 6:53. Vikings 3–0. Drive: 8 plays, 36 yards, 4:44.
- TB – Matt Bryant 39-yard field goal, 2:48. Tied 3–3. Drive: 9 plays, 58 yards, 4:05.

Second quarter

- MIN – Bobby Wade 4-yard pass from Gus Frerotte (Ryan Longwell kick), 13:33. Vikings 10–3. Drive: 8 plays, 76 yards, 4:15.
- TB – Matt Bryant 26-yard field goal, 7:48. Vikings 10–6. Drive: 10 plays, 64 yards, 5:45.
- MIN – Ryan Longwell 37-yard field goal, 1:47. Vikings 13–6. Drive: 12 plays, 51 yards, 6:01.

Third quarter

- TB – B. J. Askew 1-yard run (Matt Bryant kick), 9:25. Tied 13–13. Drive: 11 plays, 80 yards, 5:35.

Fourth quarter

- TB – Matt Bryant 29-yard field goal, 5:36. Buccaneers 16–13. Drive: 13 plays, 69 yards, 8:52.
- TB – Matt Bryant 26-yard field goal, 3:30. Buccaneers 19–13. Drive: 7 plays, 18 yards, 1:59.

Top passers

- MIN – Gus Frerotte – 14/20, 138 yards, TD
- TB – Jeff Garcia – 23/30, 255 yards

Top rushers

- MIN – Adrian Peterson – 19 rushes, 85 yards
- TB – Warrick Dunn – 20 rushes, 53 yards

Top receivers

- MIN – Bernard Berrian – 3 receptions, 46 yards
- TB – Jerramy Stevens – 6 receptions, 84 yards

Coming off their divisional home win over the Packers, the Vikings flew to Raymond James Stadium for a Week 11 duel with the Tampa Bay Buccaneers. In the first quarter, the Vikings struck first as Longwell got a 43-yard field goal. The Buccaneers responded with kicker Matt Bryant getting a 39-yard field goal. In the second quarter, Minnesota answered with Frerotte completing a 4-yard touchdown pass to wide receiver Bobby Wade. Tampa Bay replied with Bryant making a 26-yard field goal. The Vikings closed out the half with Longwell getting a 26-yard field goal.

In the third quarter, the Buccaneers tied the game with FB B. J. Askew getting a 1-yard touchdown run. In the fourth quarter, Tampa Bay took the lead as Bryant nailed a 29-yard and a 26-yard field goal. Minnesota tried to rally, but the Buccaneers' defense was too much to overcome.

With the loss, the Vikings fell to 5–5.

==== Week 12: at Jacksonville Jaguars ====
Week 12: Minnesota Vikings at Jacksonville Jaguars – Game summary

Quarter	1	2	3	4	Total
Vikings	17	0	3	10	30
Jaguars	7	3	0	2	12

at Jacksonville Municipal Stadium, Jacksonville, Florida

- Date: November 23
- Game time: 12:00 p.m.
- Game weather: Cloudy, 66 °F (19 °C)
- Game attendance: 65,064
- Referee: John Parry
- TV announcers (Fox): Chris Rose, John Lynch and Krista Voda
- Recap, Game Book

Game information

First quarter

- MIN – Napoleon Harris 27-yard fumble return (Ryan Longwell kick), 14:47. Vikings 7–0.
- MIN – Chester Taylor 3-yard run (Ryan Longwell kick), 13:19. Vikings 14–0. Drive: 3 plays, 28 yards, 1:21.
- JAX – Reggie Williams 8-yard pass from David Garrard (Josh Scobee kick), 7:57. Vikings 14–7. Drive: 4 plays, 27 yards, 1:52.
- MIN – Ryan Longwell 54-yard field goal, 6:00. Vikings 17–7. Drive: 5 plays, 19 yards, 1:57.

Second quarter

- JAX – Josh Scobee 21-yard field goal, 12:29. Vikings 17–10. Drive: 14 plays, 66 yards, 8:31.

Third quarter

- MIN – Ryan Longwell 32-yard field goal, 7:43. Vikings 20–10. Drive: 7 plays, 23 yards, 4:02.

Fourth quarter

- MIN – Ryan Longwell 22-yard field goal, 13:59. Vikings 23–10. Drive: 11 plays, 65 yards, 6:28.
- MIN – Adrian Peterson 16-yard run (Ryan Longwell kick), 6:55. Vikings 30–10. Drive: 10 plays, 60 yards, 4:58.
- JAX – Chris Kluwe ran out of bounds in the end zone for a safety, 3:01. Vikings 30–12.

Top passers

- MIN – Gus Frerotte – 12/20, 120 yards, INT
- JAX – David Garrard – 27/45, 317 yards, TD, 2 INT

Top rushers

- MIN – Adrian Peterson – 17 rushes, 80 yards, TD
- JAX – Fred Taylor – 6 rushes, 20 yards

Top receivers

- MIN – Visanthe Shiancoe – 3 receptions, 60 yards
- JAX – Maurice Jones-Drew – 9 receptions, 113 yards

Hoping to rebound from their road loss to the Buccaneers, the Vikings flew to Jacksonville Municipal Stadium for a Week 12 interconference duel with the Jacksonville Jaguars. In the first quarter, the Vikes got off to a fast start as linebacker Napoleon Harris returned a fumble 27 yards for a touchdown, while Taylor got a 3-yard touchdown run. The Jaguars responded with quarterback David Garrard completing an 8-yard touchdown pass to wide receiver Reggie Williams. Minnesota answered with a 54-yard field goal from Longwell. In the second quarter, Jacksonville got the period's only points as kicker Josh Scobee made a 21-yard field goal.

In the third quarter, the Vikings replied with Longwell making a 32-yard field goal. In the fourth quarter, Minnesota pulled away as Longwell nailed a 22-yard field goal, while Peterson got a 16-yard touchdown run. Afterwards, the Jaguars were given a safety when Vikings punter Chris Kluwe ran out of the back of his endzone.

With the win, Minnesota improved to 6–5.

==== Week 13: vs. Chicago Bears ====
Week 13: Chicago Bears at Minnesota Vikings – Game summary

Quarter	1	2	3	4	Total
Bears	7	0	7	0	14
Vikings	0	17	7	10	34

at Hubert H. Humphrey Metrodome, Minneapolis, Minnesota

- Date: November 30
- Game time: 7:15 p.m.
- Game weather: None (indoor stadium)
- Game attendance: 63,722
- Referee: Bill Leavy
- TV announcers (NBC): Al Michaels, John Madden and Andrea Kremer
- Recap, Game Book

Game information

First quarter

- CHI – Devin Hester 65-yard pass from Kyle Orton (Robbie Gould kick), 8:04. Bears 7–0. Drive: 2 plays, 68 yards, 0:49.

Second quarter

- MIN – Ryan Longwell 23-yard field goal, 12:45. Bears 7–3. Drive: 5 plays, 60 yards, 1:42.
- MIN – Bernard Berrian 99-yard pass from Gus Frerotte (Ryan Longwell kick), 4:48. Vikings 10–7. Drive: 1 play, 99 yards, 0:11.
- MIN – Gus Frerotte 1-yard run (Ryan Longwell kick), 0:48. Vikings 17–7. Drive: 8 plays, 86 yards, 1:48.

Third quarter

- CHI – Matt Forte 2-yard pass from Kyle Orton (Robbie Gould kick), 8:53. Vikings 17–14. Drive: 2 plays, 4 yards, 0:42.
- MIN – Chester Taylor 21-yard run (Ryan Longwell kick), 4:27. Vikings 24–14. Drive: 5 plays, 35 yards, 2:36.

Fourth quarter

- MIN – Adrian Peterson 1-yard run (Ryan Longwell kick), 8:25. Vikings 31–14. Drive: 6 plays, 22 yards, 3:33.
- MIN – Ryan Longwell 27-yard field goal, 4:18. Vikings 34–14. Drive: 7 plays, 11 yards, 3:46.

Top passers

- CHI – Kyle Orton – 11/29, 153 yards, 2 TD, 3 INT
- MIN – Gus Frerotte – 16/25, 210 yards, TD, INT

Top rushers

- CHI – Matt Forte – 22 rushes, 96 yards
- MIN – Adrian Peterson – 28 rushes, 131 yards, TD

Top receivers

- CHI – Devin Hester – 3 receptions, 67 yards, TD
- MIN – Bernard Berrian – 4 receptions, 122 yards, TD

Coming off their road win over the Jaguars, the Vikings went home, donned their throwback uniforms, and played a Week 13 NFC North rematch with the Chicago Bears, with first place in the division on the line. In the first quarter, Chicago struck first, with quarterback Kyle Orton completing a 65-yard touchdown pass to wide receiver Devin Hester. The Vikings responded in the second quarter with Longwell getting a 23-yard field goal. Later in the quarter, the Vikings defense came up big with a goal-line stand. Defensive end Jared Allen made the key tackle just an inch short of the end zone on fourth-and-goal. On the very next play, Frerotte ran a play-action fake from his own endzone and found former Bear Bernard Berrian for a 99-yard touchdown pass. This tied an NFL record for the longest pass from scrimmage and it was the first-ever longest offensive touchdown play in franchise history. It was also the 11th time in NFL history that a 99-yard play was made. Then, with 1:09 left until halftime, Frerotte found tight end Jim Kleinsasser for a 21-yard gain to just inside the one-yard line. The play was originally ruled a touchdown, but was officially reviewed and it was determined that he was just short of the goal line. On the next play however, Frerotte got the touchdown on a 1-yard quarterback sneak with 44 seconds left until the half.

In the third quarter, both teams traded blows. The Bears answered a 2-yard touchdown pass from Orton to running back Matt Forté, while Minnesota answered with a 21-yard touchdown run from Taylor. In the fourth quarter, the Vikes pulled away as Peterson got a 1-yard touchdown run, while Longwell nailed a 27-yard field goal.

With the win, the Vikings improved to 7–5 and took first place in the NFC North for the first time since early in the 2007 season.

==== Week 14: at Detroit Lions ====
Week 14: Minnesota Vikings at Detroit Lions – Game summary

Quarter	1	2	3	4	Total
Vikings	0	3	7	10	20
Lions	3	3	7	3	16

at Ford Field, Detroit, Michigan

- Date: December 7
- Game time: 1:00 p.m.
- Game weather: None (indoor stadium)
- Game attendance: 50,444
- Referee: Jerome Boger
- TV announcers (Fox): Sam Rosen, Tim Ryan and Chris Myers
- Recap, Game Book

Game information

First quarter

- DET – Jason Hanson 25-yard field goal, 1:01. Lions 3–0. Drive: 13 plays, 73 yards, 7:52.

Second quarter

- DET – Jason Hanson 23-yard field goal, 11:39. Lions 6–0. Drive: 8 plays, 43 yards, 3:37.
- MIN – Ryan Longwell 35-yard field goal, 4:55. Lions 6–3. Drive: 12 plays, 65 yards, 6:44.

Third quarter

- MIN – Chester Taylor 17-yard run (Ryan Longwell kick), 10:50. Vikings 10–6. Drive: 5 plays, 61 yards, 2:56.
- DET – Calvin Johnson 70-yard pass from Daunte Culpepper (Jason Hanson kick), 8:45. Lions 13–10. Drive: 3 plays, 80 yards, 2:05.

Fourth quarter

- MIN – Visanthe Shiancoe 11-yard pass from Tarvaris Jackson (Ryan Longwell kick), 11:22. Vikings 17–13. Drive: 11 plays, 90 yards, 5:35.
- DET – Jason Hanson 39-yard field goal, 5:44. Vikings 17–16. Drive: 10 plays, 48 yards, 5:38.
- MIN – Ryan Longwell 50-yard field goal, 0:22. Vikings 20–16. Drive: 10 plays, 54 yards, 5:22.

Top passers

- MIN – Tarvaris Jackson – 8/10, 105 yards, TD
- DET – Daunte Culpepper – 14/24, 220 yards, TD

Top rushers

- MIN – Adrian Peterson – 22 rushes, 105 yards
- DET – Kevin Smith – 21 rushes, 64 yards

Top receivers

- MIN – Visanthe Shiancoe – 5 receptions, 65 yards, TD
- DET – Calvin Johnson – 3 receptions, 84 yards, TD

Fresh off their divisional home win over the Bears on Sunday night, the Vikings flew to Ford Field for a Week 14 NFC North rematch with the winless Detroit Lions. Minnesota went behind late in the first quarter, as Lions kicker Jason Hanson made a 25-yard field goal. In the second quarter, Detroit increased its lead as Hanson made a 23-yard field goal. The Vikings closed the gap to three points with a 35-yard field goal from Longwell with just under 5 minutes left in the first half; however, a second interception of the game for Frerotte meant he was pulled at half-time in favor of Tarvaris Jackson.

In the third quarter, Minnesota took the lead as Taylor got a 17-yard touchdown run. The Lions replied with quarterback Daunte Culpepper (a former Viking) completing a 70-yard touchdown pass to Calvin Johnson. In the fourth quarter, the Vikings regained the lead as Jackson completed an 11-yard touchdown pass to Shiancoe. Detroit tried to rally as Hanson made a 39-yard field goal, but Longwell helped Minnesota pull away with a 50-yard field goal, his fifth successful kick of the season from 50 yards or more.

With the win, the Vikings improved to 8–5.

==== Week 15: at Arizona Cardinals ====
Week 15: Minnesota Vikings at Arizona Cardinals – Game summary

Quarter	1	2	3	4	Total
Vikings	21	7	7	0	35
Cardinals	0	0	14	0	14

at University of Phoenix Stadium, Glendale, Arizona

- Date: December 14
- Game time: 3:05 p.m.
- Game weather: None (indoor stadium)
- Game attendance: 64,457
- Referee: Ron Winter
- TV announcers (Fox): Joe Buck, Troy Aikman and Pam Oliver
- Recap, Game Book

Game information

First quarter

- MIN – Bernard Berrian 82-yard punt return (Ryan Longwell kick), 11:05. Vikings 7–0.
- MIN – Bernard Berrian 41-yard pass from Tarvaris Jackson (Ryan Longwell kick), 6:39. Vikings 14–0. Drive: 6 plays, 47 yards, 2:51.
- MIN – Sidney Rice 6-yard pass from Tarvaris Jackson (Ryan Longwell kick), 2:43. Vikings 21–0. Drive: 6 plays, 23 yards, 3:14.

Second quarter

- MIN – Chester Taylor 11-yard pass from Tarvaris Jackson (Ryan Longwell kick), 2:08. Vikings 28–0. Drive: 12 plays, 91 yards, 7:06.

Third quarter

- ARI – Jerheme Urban 50-yard pass from Kurt Warner (Neil Rackers kick), 13:43. Vikings 28–7. Drive: 3 plays, 73 yards, 1:17.
- ARI – Roderick Hood 68-yard return of blocked field goal (Neil Rackers kick), 4:27. Vikings 28–14.
- MIN – Bobby Wade 59-yard pass from Tarvaris Jackson (Ryan Longwell kick), 0:17. Vikings 35–14. Drive: 7 plays, 80 yards, 4:10.

Fourth quarter

- No scoring plays.

Top passers

- MIN – Tarvaris Jackson – 11/17, 163 yards, 4 TD
- ARI – Kurt Warner – 29/45, 270 yards, TD, INT

Top rushers

- MIN – Adrian Peterson – 28 rushes, 165 yards
- ARI – J. J. Arrington – 2 rushes, 23 yards

Top receivers

- MIN – Bobby Wade – 2 receptions, 67 yards, TD
- ARI – Jerheme Urban – 3 receptions, 82 yards, TD

Coming off their hotly contested road win over the Lions, the Vikings flew to the desert for a Week 15 duel with the newly crowned NFC West champion Arizona Cardinals. Quarterback Tarvaris Jackson returned to the starting line-up for the first time since the Vikings' Week 2 loss to the Indianapolis Colts. Early in the first quarter, the Vikings got on the board first with a punt returned 82 yards by Berrian for a touchdown. Later in the first quarter, the Vikings increased their lead with Jackson completing a 41-yard touchdown pass to Berrian. The Vikings closed out the first quarter with Jackson completing a 6-yard touchdown pass to Rice. In the second quarter, the Vikings increased their lead with an 11-yard touchdown pass from Jackson to Taylor for the only score of the period.

In the third quarter, Arizona tried to rally as quarterback Kurt Warner completed a 50-yard touchdown pass to wide receiver Jerheme Urban. Later in the quarter, the Vikings tried to put the game away with a 34-yard field goal by kicker Ryan Longwell, only to have it blocked and Arizona returning it 62 yards for a touchdown by cornerback Roderick Hood. Finally, the Vikings put the game away for good with Jackson completing a 59-yard touchdown pass to wide receiver Bobby Wade. Arizona tried to rally in the final minutes of the game, but on first-and-goal, they ran out of time.

With the win, the Vikings improved to 9–5 and to a one-game lead over the Bears in the NFC North. If the Vikings won in week 16 against Atlanta or Chicago lost against Green Bay, the Vikings clinched their 17th division title, and their first since 2000.

==== Week 16 vs. Atlanta Falcons ====
Week 16: Atlanta Falcons at Minnesota Vikings – Game summary

Quarter	1	2	3	4	Total
Falcons	7	10	7	0	24
Vikings	7	0	0	10	17

at Hubert H. Humphrey Metrodome, Minneapolis, Minnesota

- Date: December 21
- Game time: 3:05 p.m.
- Game weather: None (indoor stadium)
- Game attendance: 62,889
- Referee: Scott Green
- TV announcers (Fox): Dick Stockton, Brian Baldinger, Brian Billick and Laura Okmin
- Recap, Game Book

Game information

First quarter

- ATL – Michael Turner 1-yard run (Jason Elam kick), 8:47. Falcons 7–0. Drive: 12 plays, 74 yards, 6:13.
- MIN – Visanthe Shiancoe 21-yard pass from Tarvaris Jackson (Ryan Longwell kick), 2:00. Tied 7–7. Drive: 12 plays, 90 yards, 6:47.

Second quarter

- ATL – Jerious Norwood 8-yard pass from Matt Ryan (Jason Elam kick), 14:06. Falcons 14–7. Drive: 5 plays, 22 yards, 1:20.
- ATL – Jason Elam 22-yard field goal, 0:03. Falcons 17–7. Drive: 9 plays, 43 yards, 3:52.

Third quarter

- ATL – Justin Blalock fumble recovery in the end zone (Jason Elam kick), 2:38. Falcons 24–7. Drive: 7 plays, 51 yards, 3:29.

Fourth quarter

- MIN – Ryan Longwell 29-yard field goal, 11:32. Falcons 24–10. Drive: 12 plays, 69 yards, 6:06.
- MIN – Visanthe Shiancoe 17-yard pass from Tarvaris Jackson (Ryan Longwell kick), 2:44. Falcons 24–17. Drive: 12 plays, 82 yards, 3:14.

Top passers

- ATL – Matt Ryan – 13/24, 134 yards, TD
- MIN – Tarvaris Jackson – 22/36, 233 yards, 2 TD

Top rushers

- ATL – Michael Turner – 19 rushes, 70 yards, TD
- MIN – Tarvaris Jackson – 8 rushes, 82 yards

Top receivers

- ATL – Michael Jenkins – 4 receptions, 61 yards
- MIN – Visanthe Shiancoe – 7 receptions, 136 yards, 2 TD

Coming off their road rout of the Cardinals, the Vikings went home for a Week 16 battle with the Atlanta Falcons; a win gave the Vikings their first division title since 2000, and their first NFC North title. Minnesota trailed early in the first quarter as Falcons running back Michael Turner got a 1-yard touchdown run. The Vikings responded with a 21-yard touchdown pass from Jackson to Shiancoe. However, Atlanta answered in the second quarter with quarterback Matt Ryan completing an 8-yard touchdown pass to running back Jerious Norwood, followed by kicker Jason Elam's 22-yard field goal.

The Falcons further increased their lead in the third quarter as offensive guard Justin Blalock recovered Ryan's fumble in the endzone for a touchdown. In the fourth quarter, Minnesota tried to rally as Longwell nailed a 29-yard field goal, followed by Jackson's 17-yard touchdown pass to Shiancoe. However, Atlanta's defense prevented any further comeback from happening.

With the loss, the Vikings fell to 9–6.

==== Week 17 vs. New York Giants ====
Week 17: New York Giants at Minnesota Vikings – Game summary

Quarter	1	2	3	4	Total
Giants	0	9	7	3	19
Vikings	0	10	0	10	20

at Hubert H. Humphrey Metrodome, Minneapolis, Minnesota

- Date: December 28
- Game time: 12:00 p.m.
- Game weather: None (indoor stadium)
- Game attendance: 63,761
- Referee: Terry McAulay
- TV announcers (Fox): Dick Stockton, Brian Baldinger and Laura Okmin
- Recap, Game Book

Game information

First quarter

- No scoring plays.

Second quarter

- MIN – Ryan Longwell 48-yard field goal, 14:52. Vikings 3–0. Drive: 8 plays, 37 yards, 3:38.
- MIN – Adrian Peterson 67-yard run (Ryan Longwell kick), 11:22. Vikings 10–0. Drive: 3 plays, 76 yards, 1:30.
- NYG – John Carney 51-yard field goal, 9:30. Vikings 10–3. Drive: 5 plays, 10 yards, 1:52.
- NYG – John Carney 30-yard field goal, 1:03. Vikings 10–6. Drive: 14 plays, 79 yards, 7:29.
- NYG – John Carney 42-yard field goal, 0:00. Vikings 10–9. Drive: 5 plays, 33 yards, 0:27.

Third quarter

- NYG – Domenik Hixon 23-yard pass from David Carr (John Carney kick), 9:29. Giants 16–10. Drive: 10 plays, 80 yards, 5:31.

Fourth quarter

- NYG – John Carney 20-yard field goal, 11:22. Giants 19–10. Drive: 8 plays, 38 yards, 4:27.
- MIN – Bernard Berrian 54-yard pass from Tarvaris Jackson (Ryan Longwell kick), 9:26. Giants 19–17. Drive: 3 plays, 66 yards, 1:56.
- MIN – Ryan Longwell 50-yard field goal, 0:00. Vikings 20–19. Drive: 9 plays, 30 yards, 3:17.

Top passers

- NYG – Eli Manning – 11/19, 119 yards
- MIN – Tarvaris Jackson – 16/26, 239 yards, TD, INT

Top rushers

- NYG – Derrick Ward – 15 rushes, 77 yards
- MIN – Adrian Peterson – 21 rushes, 103 yards, TD

Top receivers

- NYG – Domenik Hixon – 4 receptions, 62 yards, TD
- MIN – Bobby Wade – 4 receptions, 98 yards

Coming into their final game of the season against the New York Giants, the Vikings needed a win or a Chicago Bears loss to clinch the NFC North division title. The scoring began early in the second quarter when Longwell kicked a 48-yard field goal for the Vikings. They continued the scoring with a 67-yard run by Peterson, the second longest of his career to date. The Giants responded with a 51-yard John Carney field goal. The Giants continued the scoring with two John Carney field goals from 30 and 42 yards respectively to round out the end of the second quarter.

In the third quarter, the Giants took the lead when David Carr threw a 23-yard pass to Domenik Hixon, then added a 20-yard John Carney field goal early in the fourth quarter, making for a Giants nine-point lead. The Vikings came back with a 54-yard pass from Jackson to Berrian and clinched the win when Ryan Longwell nailed a 50-yard, game-winning field goal as time expired.

With the victory, the Vikings finished the regular season at 10–6, winning their first division title since 2000 and earning their first playoff berth since 2004.

=== Standings ===
NFC North
	W	L	T	PCT	DIV	CONF	PF	PA	STK
^{(3)} Minnesota Vikings	10	6	0	.625	4–2	8–4	379	333	W1
Chicago Bears	9	7	0	.563	4–2	7–5	375	350	L1
Green Bay Packers	6	10	0	.375	4–2	5–7	419	380	W1
Detroit Lions	0	16	0	.000	0–6	0–12	268	517	L16

== Postseason ==
=== Schedule ===
Week	Date	Opponent	Result	Record	Venue	NFL.com recap
WC	January 4	Philadelphia Eagles	L 14–26	0–1	Hubert H. Humphrey Metrodome	Recap

=== Game summaries ===
==== NFC Wildcard Round: vs. Philadelphia Eagles ====
NFC Wildcard Round: Philadelphia Eagles at Minnesota Vikings – Game summary

Quarter	1	2	3	4	Total
Eagles	6	10	0	10	26
Vikings	0	14	0	0	14

at Hubert H. Humphrey Metrodome, Minneapolis, Minnesota

- Date: January 4
- Game time: 15:30
- Game weather: None (indoor stadium)
- Game attendance: 61,746
- Referee: Tony Corrente (99)
- TV announcers (Fox): Joe Buck, Troy Aikman, Pam Oliver and Chris Myers
- Recap, Game Book

Game information

First quarter

- PHI – David Akers 43-yard field goal, 6:44. Eagles 3–0. Drive: 4 plays, 1 yard, 1:38.
- PHI – David Akers 51-yard field goal, 0:00. Eagles 6–0. Drive: 6 plays, 42 yards, 2:36.

Second quarter

- MIN – Adrian Peterson 40-yard run (Ryan Longwell kick), 11:05. Vikings 7–6. Drive: 8 plays, 78 yards, 3:55.
- PHI – David Akers 31-yard field goal, 7:29. Eagles 9–7. Drive: 9 plays, 59 yards, 3:36.
- PHI – Asante Samuel 44-yard interception return (David Akers kick), 6:34. Eagles 16–7.
- MIN – Adrian Peterson 3-yard run (Ryan Longwell kick), 1:51. Eagles 16–14. Drive: 9 plays, 64 yards, 4:43.

Third quarter

- No scoring plays.

Fourth quarter

- PHI – Brian Westbrook 71-yard pass from Donovan McNabb (David Akers kick), 6:37. Eagles 23–14. Drive: 1 play, 71 yards, 0:16.
- PHI – David Akers 45-yard field goal, 1:55. Eagles 26–14. Drive: 6 plays, 20 yards, 0:54.

Top passers

- PHI – Donovan McNabb – 23/34, 300 yards, TD
- MIN – Tarvaris Jackson – 15/35, 164 yards

Top rushers

- PHI – Brian Westbrook – 20 rushes, 38 yards
- MIN – Adrian Peterson – 20 rushes, 83 yards

Top receivers

- PHI – Brian Westbrook – 3 receptions, 83 yards, TD
- MIN – Bernard Berrian – 2 receptions, 36 yards

Entering the postseason as the NFC's third seed, the Vikings began their playoff run at home against the sixth-seed Philadelphia Eagles and for the first time in eight years, the Vikings hosted a playoff game. Minnesota trailed early as Eagles kicker David Akers got a 43-yard and a 51-yard field goal. The Vikings responded in the second quarter as Peterson got a 40-yard touchdown run. However, Philadelphia answered with Akers' 31-yard field goal, followed by cornerback Asante Samuel's 44-yard interception return for a touchdown. Minnesota ended the half with a 3-yard touchdown run from Peterson.

After a scoreless third quarter, the Eagles increased their lead in the fourth quarter with quarterback Donovan McNabb's 71-yard touchdown pass to running back Brian Westbrook, followed by an Akers 45-yard field goal. Try as they might, the Vikings were unable to build any momentum to mount a rally.

With the loss, the Vikings' season ended with an overall record of 10–7.

== Statistics ==
=== Team leaders ===
Category	Player(s)	Value
Passing yards	Gus Frerotte	2,157
Passing touchdowns	Gus Frerotte	12
Rushing yards	Adrian Peterson	1,760
Rushing touchdowns	Adrian Peterson	10
Receiving yards	Bernard Berrian	964
Receiving touchdowns	Bernard Berrian; Visanthe Shiancoe	7
Points	Ryan Longwell	127
Kickoff return yards	Maurice Hicks	690
Punt return yards	Bernard Berrian	114
Tackles	Chad Greenway	115
Sacks	Jared Allen	14.5
Interceptions	Ben Leber; Benny Sapp; Madieu Williams; Antoine Winfield	2
Forced fumbles	Antoine Winfield; Cedric Griffin	4

=== League rankings ===
Category	Total yards	Yards per game	NFL rank (out of 32)
Passing offense	2,956	184.8	25th
Rushing offense	2,338	146.1	5th
Total offense	5,294	330.9	17th
Passing defense	3,449	215.6	18th
Rushing defense	1,230	76.9	1st
Total defense	4,679	292.4	6th
