= Troy Williamson =

American football player (born 1983)

No. 19, 82, 84
- Position: Wide receiver

Personal information
- Born: April 30, 1983 (age 43); Aiken, South Carolina, U.S.
- Listed height: 6 ft 1 in (1.85 m)
- Listed weight: 203 lb (92 kg)

Career information
- High school: Aiken (SC) Silver Bluff
- College: South Carolina (2002–2004)
- NFL draft: 2005: 1st round, 7th overall pick

Career history
- Minnesota Vikings (2005–2007); Jacksonville Jaguars (2008–2009)

Awards and highlights
- First-team All-SEC (2004)

Career NFL statistics
- Receptions: 87
- Receiving yards: 1,131
- Receiving touchdowns: 4
- Return yards: 987
- Stats at Pro Football Reference

Troy Williamson (born April 30, 1983) is an American former professional football player who was a wide receiver for five seasons in the National Football League (NFL). He was selected by the Minnesota Vikings seventh overall in the 2005 NFL draft. He played college football for the South Carolina Gamecocks.

== Early life ==
Troy Williamson attended Silver Bluff High School in Aiken, South Carolina, and he was a letterman and excelled in both football and track. His mother (Shirley Williamson) had 11 kids. In football, as a senior, he rushed for 890 yards and caught 21 passes for 500 yards (23.8 yards per rec. avg.). He was an All-American, a consensus All-State selection, won Class-AA Player of the Year honors presented by the High School Sports Report, a Mr. Football finalist for the state of South Carolina, and helped lead his team to back-to-back state championships. After his senior season, he was rated the fifth-best wide receiver prospect in the Atlantic Region by PrepStar.

=== Track and field ===
In track, Williamson was a two-time 100 meters and 200 meters state champion, with personal bests of 10.35 and 20.79 seconds.

Personal bests

Event	Time (seconds)	Venue	Date
55 meters	6.32	Columbia, New York	February 21, 2004
60 meters	6.77	Lexington, Kentucky	February 28, 2004
100 meters	10.35	Spring Valley, New York	April 20, 2002
200 meters	20.79	Minneapolis, Minnesota	January 14, 2006

== Professional career ==
Pre-draft measurables
Height	Weight	40-yard dash	10-yard split	20-yard split	20-yard shuttle	Three-cone drill	Vertical jump	Wonderlic
6 ft 1 1/4 in (1.86 m)	203 lb (92 kg)	4.32 s	1.58 s	2.57 s	4.00 s	7.10 s	37 in (0.94 m)	21
All values from NFL Combine

=== Minnesota Vikings ===
The Vikings needed a receiver with deep speed after trading Randy Moss to Oakland, drafting Williamson with the seventh overall pick in the 2005 NFL draft, using the pick acquired from trading Moss to Oakland. In the 2006−2007 off-season he claimed his hand-eye coordination was bad due to his depth perception and that was the reason for his 11 dropped balls, which tied for second in the NFL. The Vikings 2007 season was equally difficult for Williamson, who finished with 240 yards and 1 touchdown. Most notably in the Vikings' finale, Williamson dropped two crucial passes. First, a wide-open Williamson dropped an almost-certain 72-yard touchdown pass from Tarvaris Jackson in the second quarter and then another pass that would have yielded a critical first down later in the game.

=== Jacksonville Jaguars ===
After the 2007 season Williamson was traded for a 6th round pick to the Jacksonville Jaguars. The Vikings ended up using that pick to select Jaymar Johnson. Williamson controversially stated that he "wants to duke it out" with former Minnesota Vikings head coach Brad Childress because he had fined Troy $25,000 for attending his Grandmother's funeral (Childress rescinded the fine under pressure from team veterans), adding that they could "meet at the 50-yard line and go at it." The Jaguars released Williamson on September 4, 2010.

== NFL career statistics ==
Year	Team	GP	Receiving							Rushing						Kick return					Fumbles	
Year	Team	GP	Rec	Tgt	Yds	Avg	Lng	TD	FD	Att	Yds	Avg	Lng	TD	FD	Att	Yds	Avg	Lng	TD	Fum	Lost
2005	MIN	14	24	—	372	15.5	56	2	18	3	28	9.3	11	0	2	12	192	16.0	28	0	0	0
2006	MIN	14	37	76	455	12.3	46	0	22	0	0	0.0	0	0	0	14	324	23.1	44	0	0	0
2007	MIN	11	18	37	240	13.3	60	1	9	2	29	14.5	26	0	1	17	387	22.8	56	0	0	0
2008	JAX	8	5	13	30	6.0	10	1	2	1	1	1.0	1	0	0	4	84	21.0	26	0	0	0
2009	JAX	2	3	4	34	11.3	13	0	1	0	0	0.0	0	0	0	0	0	0.0	0	0	1	1
Career		49	87	130	1,131	13.0	60	4	52	6	58	9.7	26	0	3	47	987	21.0	56	0	1	1
