= Jaymar Johnson =

American football player (born 1984)

- Johnson with the Minnesota Vikings in 2008

No. 11, 83
- Position: Wide receiver

Personal information
- Born: July 10, 1984 (age 42); Gary, Indiana, U.S.
- Listed height: 6 ft 0 in (1.83 m)
- Listed weight: 176 lb (80 kg)

Career information
- High school: William A. Wirt (Gary)
- College: Jackson State
- NFL draft: 2008: 6th round, 193rd overall pick

Career history
- Minnesota Vikings (2008–2010); Arizona Cardinals (2011); Winnipeg Blue Bombers (2014)*
- * Offseason or practice squad member only

Career NFL statistics
- Receptions: 1
- Receiving yards: 9
- Punt returns: 16
- Punt return yards: 134
- Stats at Pro Football Reference

Jaymar Johnson (born July 10, 1984) is an American former professional football player who was a wide receiver in the National Football League (NFL). He was selected by the Minnesota Vikings in the sixth round of the 2008 NFL draft. He played college football for the Jackson State Tigers.

Johnson also played for the Arizona Cardinals.

== Early life ==
Johnson was born on July 10, 1984, in Gary, Indiana. As a kid, he won seven Pop Warner trophies and his nickname was "Double-J".

As a senior in high school he was named All-State, All-Area and All-Conference.

=== Shootings ===
As a teenager, Johnson left his aunt's home in Gary with his nephew (William M. Fields Jr.) and was caught in the crossfire of a gun battle about 100 yards from his location.

A few years later during a pickup basketball game, Johnson fled with his cousins and later discovered his t-shirt had been grazed by a bullet.

== College career ==
Johnson attended Jackson State University and debuted for the Tigers against Alabama State and future teammate Tarvaris Jackson. As a junior, he had a career-high 199 receiving yards against Southern. During his last three seasons at Jackson State, Johnson started in every game. He majored in health education at Jackson State.

== Professional career ==
=== Minnesota Vikings ===
Johnson was selected by the Minnesota Vikings in the sixth round of the 2008 NFL draft (193rd overall), through a pick acquired from trading Troy Williamson to the Jacksonville Jaguars. He became the first Jackson State player to be drafted since Sylvester Morris in the 2000 NFL draft. He was cut late during training camp but was re-signed to the practice squad on September 1, 2008. He spent most of the year on the practice squad. According to Vikings head coach Brad Childress, during the 2009 offseason, Johnson put on 17 pounds getting up to 187 and was the hardest worker on the team.

During the 2010 preseason, Johnson was placed on the Injured Reserve list, having broken his left thumb in the Week 1 preseason game against the St. Louis Rams. The injury allowed the Vikings to re-register returning quarterback Brett Favre to their 53-man roster.

On September 2, 2011, he was waived by Minnesota.

=== Arizona Cardinals ===
The Arizona Cardinals signed him to their practice squad on September 20. He was promoted to the active roster on November 29. Johnson was waived on December 23, 2011. Johnson was added to the practice squad on December 28, 2011. He was waived on August 25, 2012.

=== Winnipeg Blue Bombers ===
Johnson signed with the Winnipeg Blue Bombers of the Canadian Football League in April 2014. Johnson was released from the team on June 20, 2014.

== Personal ==
His brother James played college football at Arkansas-Pine Bluff. He is the youngest of eight children and enjoys playing the saxophone and planned on joining the medical field following his college career.
