= Brad Childress =

American football coach (born 1956)

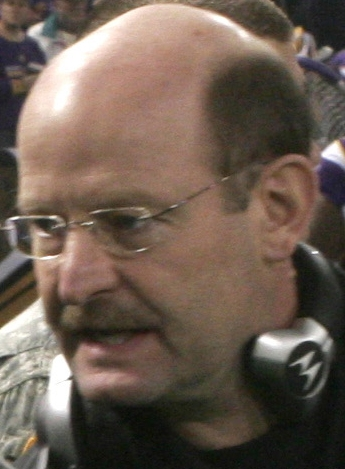
- Childress in 2007

Personal information
- Born: June 27, 1956 (age 70); Aurora, Illinois, U.S.

Career information
- High school: Marmion Academy (Aurora)
- College: Eastern Illinois

Career history
- Illinois (1978–1980) Running backs coach; Illinois (1981–1984) Wide receivers coach; Indianapolis Colts (1985) Quarterbacks coach; Northern Arizona (1986–1989) Offensive coordinator; Utah (1990) Wide receivers coach; Wisconsin (1991–1992) Running backs coach; Wisconsin (1993–1998) Offensive coordinator; Philadelphia Eagles (1999–2001) Quarterbacks coach; Philadelphia Eagles (2002–2005) Offensive coordinator; Minnesota Vikings (2006–2010) Head coach; Cleveland Browns (2012) Offensive coordinator; Kansas City Chiefs (2013–2015) Spread game analyst; Kansas City Chiefs (2016) Offensive coordinator; Kansas City Chiefs (2017) Assistant head coach; Chicago Bears (2018) Offensive analyst; Chicago Bears (2019) Senior offensive assistant

Head coaching record
- Regular season: 39–35 (.527)
- Postseason: 1–2 (.333)
- Career: 40–37 (.519)
- Coaching profile at Pro Football Reference

Brad Childress (born June 27, 1956) is an American former football coach. He worked for over 40 years as a coach for various college programs and National Football League (NFL) franchises. He was the offensive coordinator for Wisconsin from 1994 to 1998, the offensive coordinator for the Philadelphia Eagles from 1999 to 2005, the head coach of the Minnesota Vikings from 2006 to 2010, the offensive coordinator for the Cleveland Browns in 2012, and the offensive coordinator for the Kansas City Chiefs in 2016.

== Early life ==
Childress attended high school at the Marmion Academy in Aurora, Illinois. He is a 1978 graduate of Eastern Illinois University, where he preceded current Denver Broncos head coach Sean Payton. Childress attended Eastern Illinois after playing quarterback and wide receiver at the University of Illinois. Childress suffered an injury before ever playing for Eastern Illinois. He was one of three Eastern Illinois University alumni who have been head coaches in the NFL, along with Sean Payton and Mike Shanahan. Prior to his hiring by the Vikings, Childress had worked exclusively as an offensive coach, working his way up through the ranks at various colleges and NFL organizations, first as a position coach, culminating with his offensive coordinator position with the Eagles.

== Coaching career ==
=== College coaching ===
During the last four seasons of his tenure on the University of Illinois' coaching staff, the Illini posted four consecutive winning seasons ('81–'84), including a Big Ten championship and a trip to the Rose Bowl in 1983. Childress followed stints with the Indianapolis Colts, Northern Arizona, and the University of Utah with a successful run at the University of Wisconsin. Childress was the offensive coordinator under former Badger head coach Barry Alvarez, and directed offenses that helped the Badgers to five bowl game appearances from 1993 to 1998, including two Rose Bowls as Big Ten co-champions following the 1993 and 1998 seasons. He coached running back Ron Dayne for three seasons. Dayne went on to win the 1999 Heisman Trophy and finished his career as the all-time leading rusher in the Football Bowl Subdivision.

=== Philadelphia Eagles (1999–2005) ===
Childress joined the Philadelphia Eagles for the 1999 NFL season, and helped the team to three consecutive trips to the NFC Championship Game (2001–03), and a Super Bowl trip in 2004. Andy Reid, the Eagles' head coach, had previously worked with Childress at Northern Arizona University, a staff that also included future NFL coaches Bill Callahan and Marty Mornhinweg. While Childress did not call plays for the Eagles (this responsibility was taken by Andy Reid), he did receive credit for his work with quarterback Donovan McNabb, who was named to five Pro Bowls during his time with Childress.

=== Minnesota Vikings (2006–2010) ===
On January 6, 2006, Childress was hired to be the 7th head coach of the Minnesota Vikings. This choice was the result of a short selection process. Former coach Mike Tice was informed that his contract would not be renewed shortly after the Vikings' last game of the 2005 season on December 31. Four candidates were interviewed by the Vikings: Childress, Kansas City Chiefs offensive coordinator Al Saunders, Indianapolis Colts assistant head coach Jim Caldwell, and former Vikings defensive coordinator Ted Cottrell.

The Vikings were 9–7 with Mike Tice in 2005, the year before Childress was named head coach. After going 6–10 in his first season in 2006, the team went 8–8 in his second season in 2007, narrowly missing a playoff berth. This was followed by a 10–6 record and NFC North title in 2008 while battling the fourth-toughest schedule in the NFL. However, the Vikings were defeated by the #6 seed Philadelphia Eagles 26–14 in the first round of the 2008–09 NFL playoffs.

On November 19, 2009, the Vikings announced they would be extending Childress's contract through the 2013 season. The owner Zygi Wilf was cited as saying, “Brad has done a tremendous job leading this football team and we value the positive environment he has created for the Minnesota Vikings on and off the field, He has continued to positively impact this team and create a strong foundation for future success."

Partly due to frustration with the development of quarterback Tarvaris Jackson, the Vikings signed Brett Favre for the 2009 season. Favre joined to the team after a controversial courtship which included Childress picking him up at the airport. Favre led the Vikings to a 12–4 season, losing to the eventual Super Bowl XLIV champion New Orleans Saints in the NFC Championship Game.

In 2010, the Vikings acquired wide receiver Randy Moss and a seventh-round selection in the 2012 NFL draft from the New England Patriots in early October 2010 in exchange for the Vikings' third-round selection in the 2011 draft. Just four weeks later Moss was waived under Childress' direction, one day after Moss criticized Childress and teammates in a press conference following the Vikings' loss to the New England Patriots at Gillette Stadium. Just before the press conference, Moss reportedly told team owner Zygi Wilf that Childress was unfit to coach in the NFL and should be fired. In violation of the team's policy where ownership is to be kept in the loop, Childress did not consider consulting with Wilf on the decision to waive Moss, although it was likely that Wilf would have not opposed this move, plus Childress's contract gives him the final say on football matters. After the unilateral decision to cut Moss, Childress' integrity was questioned by at least one former Vikings beat reporter.

Childress was fired on November 22, 2010, following a 31–3 home loss to the eventual Super Bowl XLV champion Green Bay Packers which dropped the team to 3–7 on the year.

=== Cleveland Browns (2012) ===
On January 27, 2012, Childress became the Cleveland Browns offensive coordinator, reuniting with head coach Pat Shurmur, whom he worked alongside at the Philadelphia Eagles from 1999 to 2005. He lasted just one season in Cleveland, and was let go at the end of the year along with head coach Pat Shurmur and the rest of the coaching staff.

=== Kansas City Chiefs (2013–2017) ===
On March 28, 2013, new head coach of the Kansas City Chiefs Andy Reid hired Childress as the spread game analyst and special projects coordinator, a position he stayed at for three seasons. On January 18, 2016, he was promoted to co-offensive coordinator with Matt Nagy. During games, Childress worked from a stadium skybox and Nagy on the sidelines. On February 13, 2017, Childress was promoted to assistant head coach. Childress announced his retirement on January 8, 2018, following a wildcard round playoff loss to the Tennessee Titans.

=== Atlanta Legends ===
On April 25, 2018, the Alliance of American Football announced Childress would serve as head coach of the Atlanta Legends starting with the inaugural 2019 season. On January 9, 2019, one month before the team's first game, Childress resigned, with defensive coordinator Kevin Coyle succeeding him.

In a 2019 interview with the Chicago Sun-Times, Childress explained his decision was spurred by doubts about the AAF's long-term viability prior to the start of the 2019 season. The league would fold midseason for financial troubles.

=== Chicago Bears (2018–2019) ===
On February 27, 2018, Childress came out of retirement to reunite with Nagy on the Chicago Bears as an offensive consultant. Serving through the 2018 offseason and training camp, Childress assisted Nagy in developing and installing his offense.

Childress rejoined the Bears on May 1, 2019, as the senior offensive assistant.

He retired from coaching in April 2020.

== Head coaching record ==
Team	Year	Regular season					Postseason			
Team	Year	Won	Lost	Ties	Win %	Finish	Won	Lost	Win %	Result
MIN	2006	6	10	0	.375	3rd in NFC North	–	–	–	–
MIN	2007	8	8	0	.500	2nd in NFC North	–	–	–	–
MIN	2008	10	6	0	.625	1st in NFC North	0	1	.000	Lost to Philadelphia Eagles in NFC Wild Card Game
MIN	2009	12	4	0	.750	1st in NFC North	1	1	.500	Lost to New Orleans Saints in NFC Championship Game
MIN	2010	3	7	0	.300	Fired	–	–	–	–
Total		39	35	0	.527		1	2	.333	
