= Tarvaris Jackson =

American football player (1983–2020)

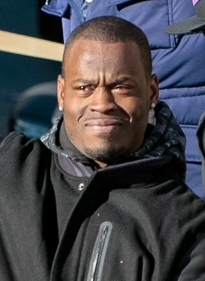
- Jackson at the Seahawks' Super Bowl XLVIII parade in Feb. 2014

No. 7
- Position: Quarterback

Personal information
- Born: April 21, 1983; Montgomery, Alabama, U.S.
- Died: April 12, 2020 (aged 36); Pike Road, Alabama, U.S.
- Listed height: 6 ft 2 in (1.88 m)
- Listed weight: 225 lb (102 kg)

Career information
- High school: Sidney Lanier (Montgomery)
- College: Arkansas (2001–2002); Alabama State (2003–2005)
- NFL draft: 2006: 2nd round, 64th overall pick

Career history

Playing
- Minnesota Vikings (2006–2010); Seattle Seahawks (2011); Buffalo Bills (2012); Seattle Seahawks (2013–2015)

Coaching
- Alabama State (2018) Offensive quality control & quarterbacks coach; Tennessee State (2019) Quarterbacks coach

Awards and highlights
- Super Bowl champion (XLVIII); Second-team All-SWAC (2005)

Career NFL statistics
- Passing attempts: 1,037
- Passing completions: 640
- Completion percentage: 59.6%
- TD–INT: 39–35
- Passing yards: 7,263
- Passer rating: 78.5
- Rushing yards: 636
- Rushing touchdowns: 6
- Stats at Pro Football Reference

Tarvaris D'Andre Jackson (April 21, 1983 – April 12, 2020) was an American professional football player who was a quarterback in the National Football League (NFL). Jackson played college football for the Arkansas Razorbacks and the Alabama State Hornets. He was selected by the Minnesota Vikings in the second round of the 2006 NFL draft.

A reserve quarterback for much of his time with the Vikings, Jackson was starting quarterback for the 2007 season and part of the 2008 season, after which Jackson started the Vikings' Wild Card playoff game. In 2011, Jackson signed with the Seattle Seahawks and was starting quarterback for the 2011 season. Jackson was then traded to the Buffalo Bills before the 2012 season, but never played a game. Jackson returned to the Seahawks in 2013. He was the backup quarterback for Russell Wilson during their Super Bowl XLVIII win.

== Early life and college ==
Jackson was born and raised in Montgomery, Alabama, and graduated from Sidney Lanier High School of Montgomery in 2001.

=== Arkansas ===
Jackson then enrolled at the University of Arkansas and played three games for the Razorbacks as a freshman but suffered a season-ending injury. Consequently, Jackson received a medical redshirt for the season. Jackson finished 2001 with 3 of 9 passes completed for 53 yards and one interception and rushed 14 yards on seven carries. In 2002, Jackson played 8 games. He completed 14 of 39 passes for 143 yards, one touchdown, and two interceptions and rushed –16 yards in 14 carries.

=== Alabama State ===
In 2003, after trailing on the depth chart to future first round draft pick Matt Jones, Jackson transferred to Alabama State University and led the Hornets to an 8–5 record, Southwestern Athletic Conference (SWAC) Eastern Division title, and berth in the SWAC Championship Game. He completed 160 of 316 passes for 2,342 yards, 18 touchdowns, and 13 interceptions and rushed 444 yards on 91 carries including five touchdowns. As a junior in 2004, Jackson won SWAC Championship MVP in Alabama State's second 10-win season in school history. With 11 starts in 12 games, Jackson passed for 2,556 yards, 20 touchdowns, and nine interceptions. He had 67 carries for 215 yards and three touchdowns. In his senior season in 2005, Jackson was named team captain and was a second-team All-SWAC selection. He threw for 2,655 yards, 25 touchdowns, and five interceptions. He rushed for 271 yards and two touchdowns on 95 carries.

== Professional career ==
=== 2006 NFL draft ===
Pre-draft measurables
Height	Weight	Arm length	Hand span	40-yard dash	10-yard split	20-yard split	20-yard shuttle	Three-cone drill	Vertical jump	Broad jump	Bench press	Wonderlic
6 ft 2 in (1.88 m)	226 lb (103 kg)	31 3/4 in (0.81 m)	9 3/8 in (0.24 m)	4.69 s	1.65 s	2.74 s	4.38 s	7.40 s	31.5 in (0.80 m)	8 ft 11 in (2.72 m)	22 reps	19
All values were taken at the NFL Scouting Combine except the Wonderlic that was taken at Alabama State's Pro Day; see also NFL prospect profile at the Wayback Machine (archived May 19, 2006).

Vikings scouts and personnel had reportedly been watching him closely in secret over his senior season, particularly liking his performance in the East-West Shrine Game. They were also impressed by his workout at the scouting combine (among the top 5 quarterbacks in ball speed and the 40-yard dash). Several NFL teams, including the Vikings, had arranged secret workouts with him too. Jackson was selected with the last pick in the second round (64th overall) of the 2006 NFL draft, while he was projected to go much later, in the sixth or seventh round. The Vikings traded two 3rd round picks to get the 2nd round pick with which they drafted Jackson, fearing he might get picked sooner than anticipated. Jackson's early selection caused some surprise, as he was the 5th quarterback taken and the 1st Division I-AA player selected (the previous I-AA quarterback drafted was Spergon Wynn in 2000). He was also the first quarterback from Alabama State to be drafted into the NFL since Ricky Jones in 1992. Even Jackson was surprised by the pick, saying, "I was more focused on [getting drafted in] the third round and even that was stretching it". Most pre-draft publications did not even have him listed as one of the top 10 eligible quarterbacks, while he was the 5th selected. On July 26, 2006, Jackson signed a four-year deal with Minnesota, including a $1 million signing bonus.

Vikings coach Brad Childress was quoted days before the draft as saying he was interested in finding a "developmental guy", a "diamond in the rough" quarterback of the future, raw talent he could teach a system.

The day after the draft, Childress was quoted by the St. Paul Pioneer Press as saying: "I think you judge quarterbacks a little bit differently...When you see what you want at the quarterback position, you need to go get it. And that's exactly what I see with Tarvaris Jackson is a guy that's a piece of clay, that has all the skills in terms of, No. 1, what's he look like throwing the football?...He's got a great throwing motion; he's athletic. He has all those things that we're looking for, and he's wired right. That's important for a quarterback. I think he's a flatline guy. I think he's a sponge. You're talking about a guy that never had a coach there as a quarterback coach. So what can he do with coaching?"

=== Minnesota Vikings ===
==== 2006 season ====
Jackson's 2006 pre-season passer rating was 106.1, 15th in the league out of 110 quarterbacks who performed. Only one quarterback from his draft class (Jay Cutler) did better. He also showed great scrambling skills averaging 11.3 yards in rushing (the only Viking other than Brad Johnson to average more than 3.3 yards in rushing). ESPN analyst Mike Tirico referred to Jackson as a right-handed Michael Vick. His pre-season performance was enough to surpass second and third-string quarterbacks Mike McMahon and J. T. O'Sullivan on the depth chart. After the pre-season, McMahon and O'Sullivan were cut from the team and Brooks Bollinger was brought in, whom Jackson then competed against for the number two spot.

On September 25, 2006, Jackson had minor knee surgery to repair the meniscus in his knee. He returned to limited practice after two weeks, and then came back to play his first NFL game with the Vikings in week 13 against the Chicago Bears in the fourth quarter after Johnson was benched for throwing four interceptions and backup quarterback Brooks Bollinger was injured. Jackson completed three of his four passes before fumbling the ball to Chicago and the Bears then ran the clock out. Following this game, when Jackson was asked if he was ready to take over as starter, he said: "Not really...We still have a chance to make the playoffs, so we're still trying to do that. So it's obvious that Brad is still our quarterback so we can stay on that."

In Week 15, Johnson started the game but was benched in the fourth quarter when the Vikings had been underperforming the entire game losing by a score of 26–7 at the time Jackson went in late in the third quarter against the New York Jets. Although Johnson had not thrown an interception that game and had a respectable passer rating of 94.2 in the game, the Minnesota fans jeered Johnson throughout the game and chanted "We want Jackson!" at numerous points because Johnson had only thrown nine touchdowns all season (in 14 games) and had a career worst 71.9 passer rating throughout the season. Jackson received a standing ovation as he trotted out onto the field. A landmark in Jackson's career happened that game when Jackson completed his first touchdown pass to Mewelde Moore. Jackson threw 177 yards, one touchdown, and ran three times for 20 yards while the Jets protected their large lead. He also threw an interception in the red zone.

Jackson was named the starting quarterback for Minnesota towards the end of his rookie season. Jackson's first game was a week 16 night game against the Green Bay Packers at Lambeau Field. Game conditions were very poor. A steady rain fell throughout the evening and the kickoff temperature was only 36 degrees Fahrenheit. The Vikings lost by a score of 9–7 with the only Vikings score coming from an interception for a touchdown by defensive back Fred Smoot. The offense set a franchise low record of only three first downs the whole game, did not get close enough to the end zone to even attempt a field goal, and only had 27 passing yards gained against the NFL's 19th ranked defense (ranked 26th against the pass). Jackson had a passer rating of 36.5, had a 50% completion rate (10–20 for 50 yards), one interception, and one fumble. Packers quarterback Brett Favre only managed a slightly better 52% completion rate (26–50) and threw two interceptions. He threw for 285 yards with no touchdowns.

==== 2007 season ====
Jackson did not live up to the Vikings' expectations in 2007 despite finishing 8–4 as a starter. Jackson had nine touchdowns and 12 interceptions, along with a 159 yards per game, causing the Vikings to have the second-worst passing offense in the NFL. His 70.8 passer rating was 28th among NFL quarterbacks. Jackson missed three games because of injuries, which included a strained groin, a concussion and a fractured index finger. The Vikings failed to make the playoffs. Analysts put the Vikings' 8–8 record on the successful running of Chester Taylor and rookie Adrian Peterson, which took the pressure off of Jackson and the defense.

Later in the season, opponents decided to focus all their defensive efforts on stopping Peterson and the Vikings running game, while daring Jackson to beat them in the passing game. The Washington Redskins successfully utilized five defensive lineman or four linebackers against the Vikings, leaving only two or three defensive backs in pass coverage. And the 49ers blitzed their cornerbacks 20 percent of the time instead of covering receivers with them. On the season's last game against the Denver Broncos, Jackson led the Vikings to two fourth quarter drives to tie the game and send it into overtime. In overtime, however, Jackson fumbled on the second play and the Vikings lost the game. Jackson showed slow improvement over the season: he played a large role when the Vikings went on a five-game winning streak in November, but also showed his inexperience in several ill-judged interceptions, jump passes, and turnovers. After the season, Childress would not say if Tarvaris Jackson would be the starter in 2008.

==== 2008 season ====
There was a lot of media coverage on Jackson the summer of 2008. The Vikings returned seven players that were in the 2008 Pro Bowl (only three teams had more), and spent $60 million in guaranteed contract money upgrading their team with Jared Allen, traded from the Kansas City Chiefs, and free agents Bernard Berrian and Madieu Williams. Several analysts believed better quarterback play was all that was needed to make the Vikings one of the top contending teams in the NFL, and with the Green Bay Packers losing Brett Favre the NFC North Division was up for grabs. Sport's Illustrated's Paul Zimmerman predicted the Vikings would win the Super Bowl.

Head coach Brad Childress decided to stay with Jackson as the starting quarterback and brought in Gus Frerotte to be his backup. It was widely reported in the off-season that Jackson had a new swagger, handled situations in practice well where he looked lost in the previous years, and had an improved grasp of the Vikings offensive system. Childress threw a "Coaching 101" clinic for media reporters in which he played a tape of Jackson showing the progress he made in 2007 through a series of missed passes or poor decisions that he made in early games but executed properly in later contests and concluded with some tape of him hitting a target net with every 15-yard pass he threw during an offseason drill. Offensive coordinator Darrell Bevell repeatedly told the press that although it was Jackson's third year with the Vikings it was really his second year playing, and NFL quarterbacks improve the most between their first and second years. Jackson had another good preseason, until he injured his knee again in the second preseason game which kept him from playing the last two preseason games.

In the first game of the regular season against the Green Bay Packers, Jackson threw a game-ending interception and in the second game the Vikings made five field goal attempts and no touchdowns against the Indianapolis Colts. The Vikings lost both games by close margins, and Jackson's 64.8 passer rating ranked him 26th in the NFL. Childress said in the second post-game press conference that Jackson would still definitely be the starter next week, but on Monday after a coaches' meeting he changed his mind and benched Jackson for the remainder of the year.

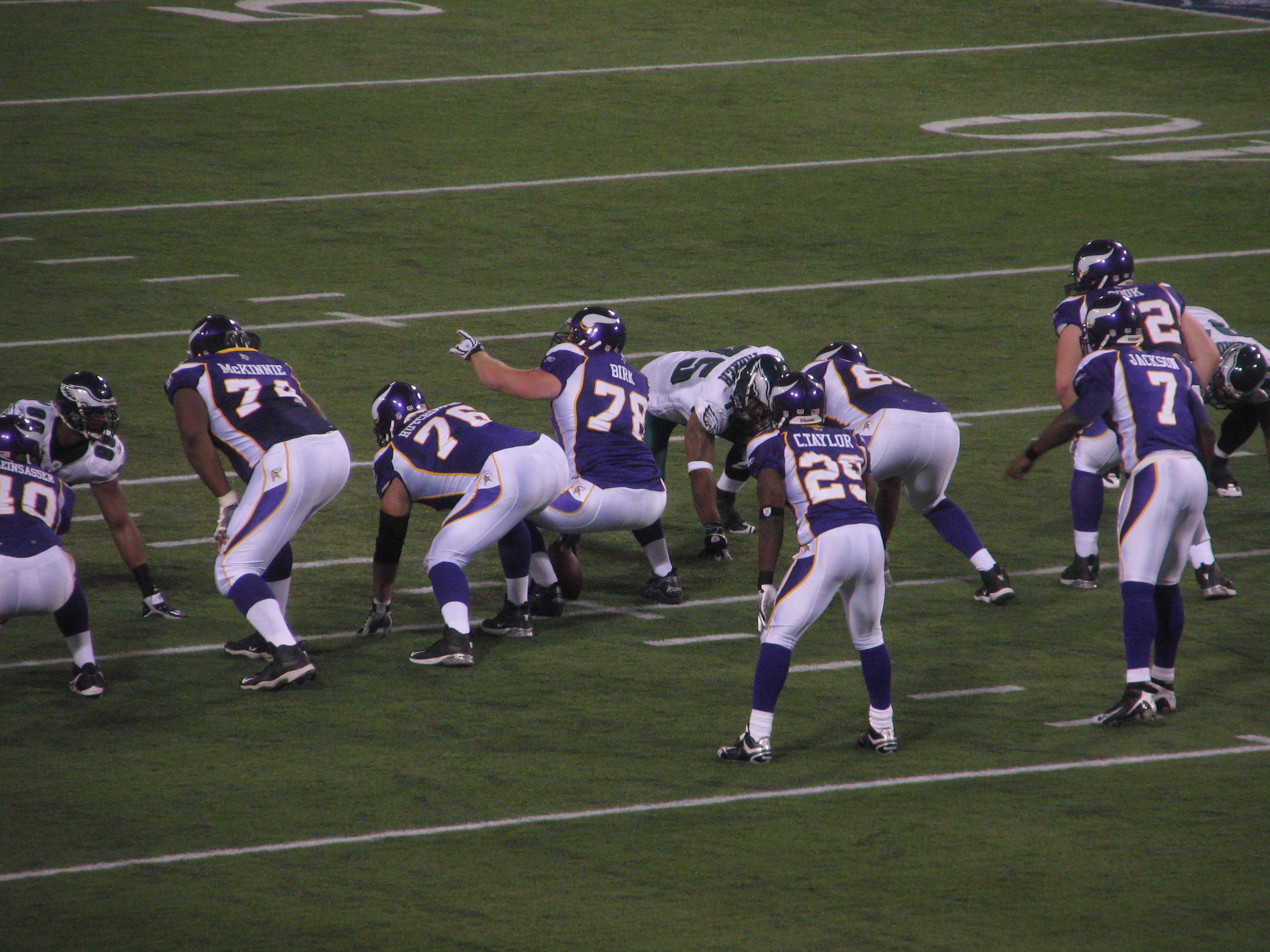
Jackson (7) with the Vikings

After being relegated to backup after the loss to the Colts, Jackson saw his next significant action in Week 14 against Detroit, where he played the entire second half in place of an injured Gus Frerotte. With the Vikings trailing 6–3 at halftime to the winless Lions, Jackson completed eight of ten passes for 105 yards and a touchdown, an 11-yard strike to tight end Visanthe Shiancoe that would be the game-winning score for the Vikings. The following week, with Frerotte still injured, Jackson was the starting quarterback against the Arizona Cardinals and he played arguably the best game of his career. Jackson completed 11 of 17 passes for 163 yards and, most impressively, threw four touchdown passes and no interceptions. Jackson earned NFC Offensive Player of the Week honors for his performance as well as the FedEx Air Player of the Week award.

The Vikings lost 24–17 to the Atlanta Falcons in Week 16 despite Jackson's performance. He completed 22 of 36 passes for 233 yards with two touchdowns and no interceptions. He also rushed for 76 yards (which matched the total of Pro-Bowl running back Adrian Peterson). With the Vikings in a win-and-in situation against the New York Giants in Week 17, Jackson overcame an interception in the end zone by leading the Vikings on a touchdown drive (a 54-yard strike to Bernard Berrian) and the game-winning field goal drive on the following possessions. The Vikings defeated the Giants 20–19 and earned the NFC North title.

The Vikings season ended in the Wild Card Round of the playoffs with a loss to the Philadelphia Eagles. Jackson went 15-for-35 for 164 yards in the game with one interception.

==== 2009 season ====
Jackson went into the 2009 season in competition for a starting job with Sage Rosenfels, who the Vikings had acquired from the Houston Texans. The Vikings also pursued former New York Jets and Green Bay Packers quarterback Brett Favre, who had retired after the end of the 2008 season. Favre announced that he would not join the Vikings prior to training camp, however, and Jackson and Rosenfels split duties in the early part of camp. Jackson was the second quarterback to play in the opening preseason game, and was expected to start the second preseason game against the Kansas City Chiefs.

That changed, however, when Favre announced that he would play for the Vikings after all, signing with the team on August 19. Jackson, Rosenfels, and 2008 third-stringer John David Booty were believed to be competing for two roster spots, and for the primary backup job. Many observers believed the Vikings would attempt to trade Jackson.

Jackson helped his case with a strong performance in Favre's debut game against the Kansas City Chiefs, throwing for 202 yards and two touchdowns in backup work. Ultimately, the Vikings elected to keep Jackson and Rosenfels on the active roster, with Jackson as the primary backup to Favre.

Jackson entered the Vikings' first two games of the season in garbage time.

==== 2010 season ====
The Vikings re-signed Jackson on April 19, 2010, as they waited for Favre to decide whether he would return for another season, which he did. Jackson was a restricted free agent who was given a one-year tender worth $1.176 million. Jackson backed up Favre for the 2010 season.

Jackson took over for an injured Favre in Week 8 against the New England Patriots. Jackson threw for one touchdown in the loss. Jackson took over for an injured Favre yet again in Week 13 against the Buffalo Bills. Jackson threw two touchdown passes to Sidney Rice in the 38–14 win, but also threw three interceptions. Jackson started on December 13, against the New York Giants in place of the injured Favre. In that game, Jackson suffered a turf toe injury and missed the rest of the season.

On March 3, 2011, the Vikings declined to tender Jackson a contract offer to play for them in the 2011 season. Under league rules, Jackson became an unrestricted free agent.

=== Seattle Seahawks (first stint) ===
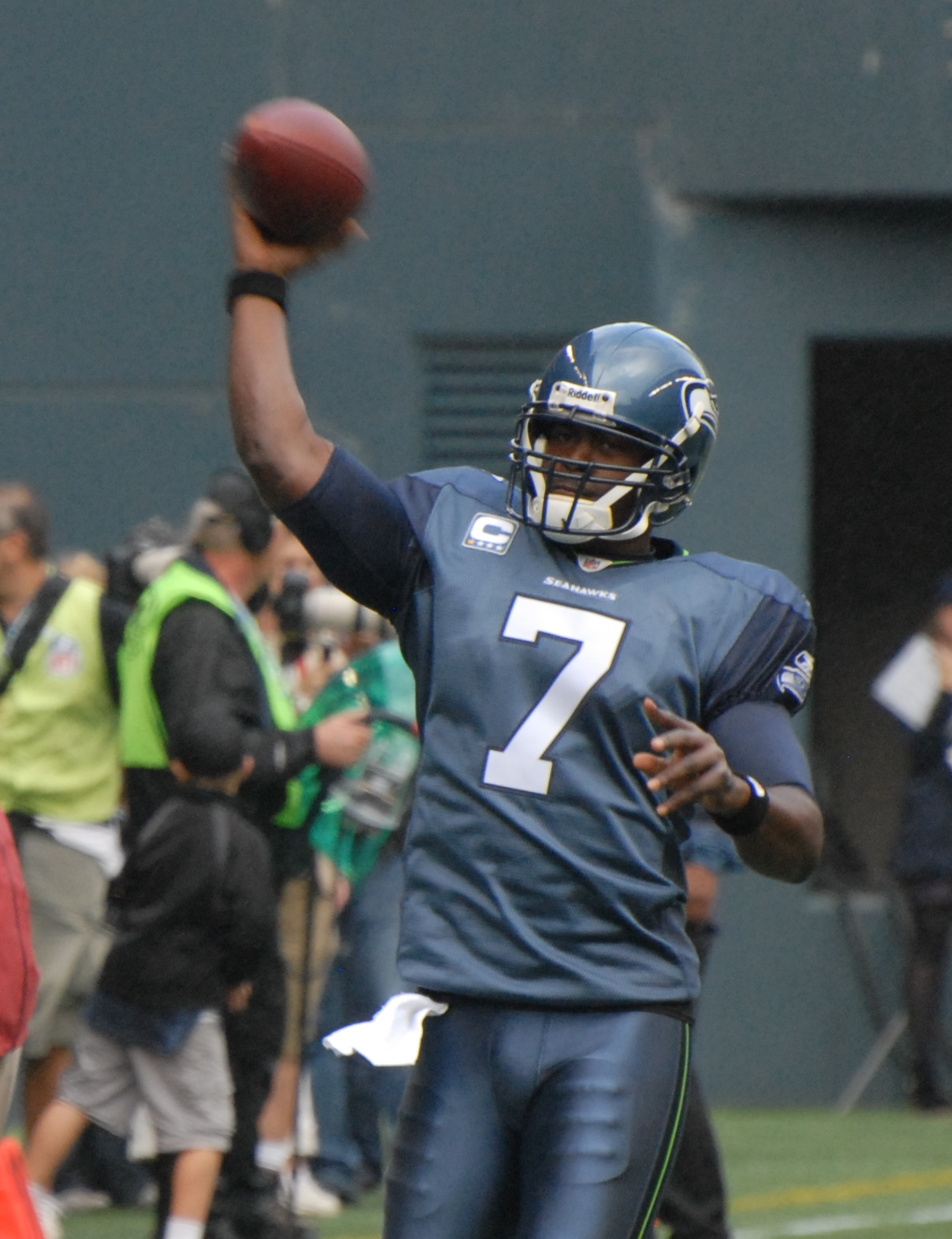
Jackson with the Seahawks in 2011

Jackson officially signed a two-year contract with the Seattle Seahawks on July 29, 2011 and was announced as the starting quarterback shortly after. In Seattle, he had been reunited with offensive coordinator Darrell Bevell and wide receiver Sidney Rice both members of the Vikings during his time there. Along with wide receiver Mike Williams, Jackson was appointed to offensive team captain, which was previously owned by Matt Hasselbeck, who signed with the Tennessee Titans. Despite having a below-average year compared to other quarterbacks in the league, Jackson had the best year of his career, finishing with 3,091 yards passing, throwing 14 touchdowns and 13 interceptions. During the off-season, the Seahawks acquired former Green Bay Packers quarterback Matt Flynn and drafted Wisconsin quarterback Russell Wilson to compete with Jackson for the 2012 starting quarterback position.

=== Buffalo Bills ===
On August 26, 2012, Jackson was traded to the Buffalo Bills for a conditional seventh round draft pick. The third-string quarterback for the season, Jackson did not see any game action in 2012.

On February 15, 2013, the Bills re-signed Jackson to a one-year, $2.25 million deal. He was released on June 10, 2013. ESPN reported on June 12 that Jackson was likely to re-sign with the Seattle Seahawks for the 2013 season.

=== Seattle Seahawks (second stint) ===
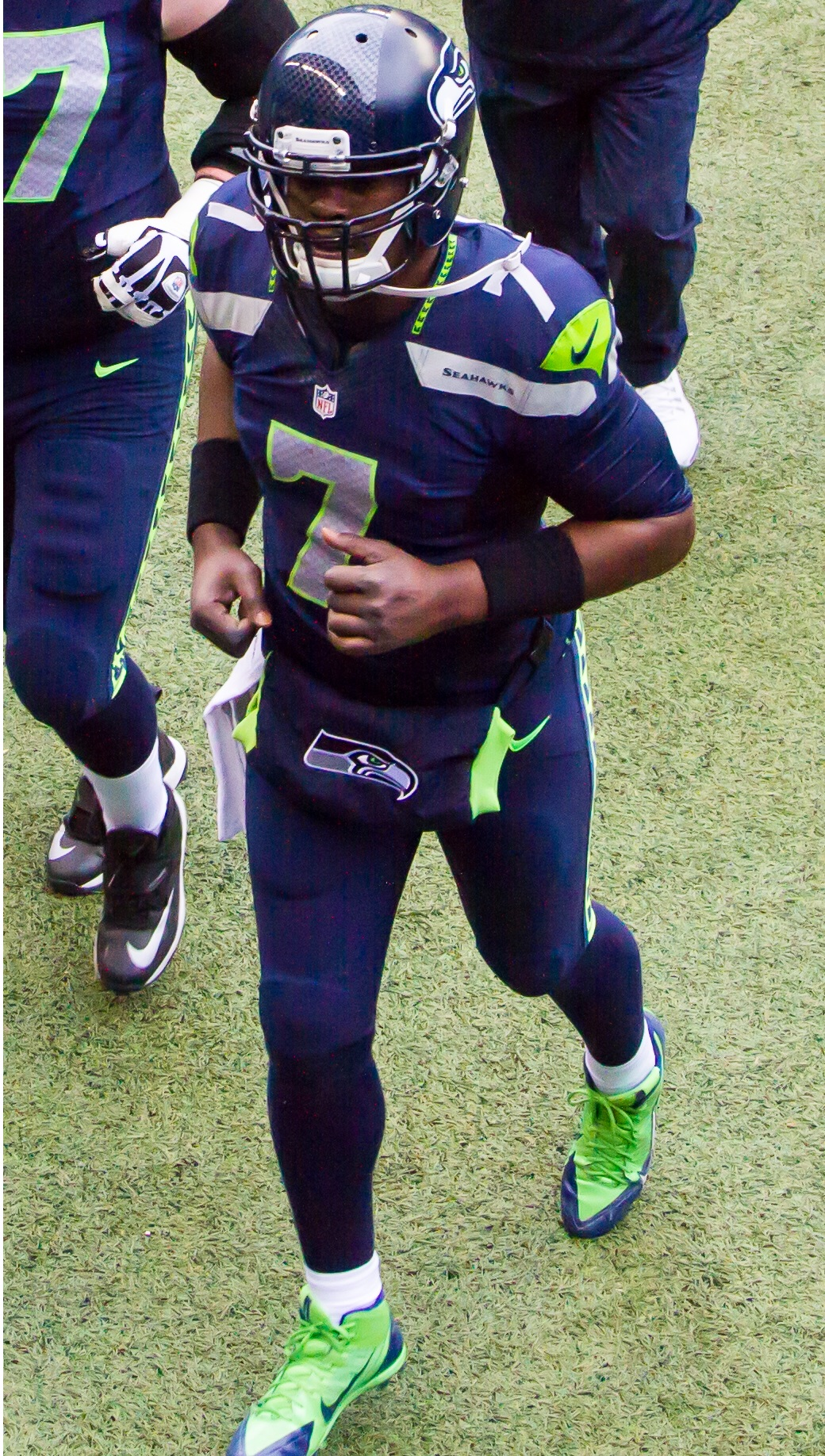
Jackson in 2013

On June 13, 2013, Jackson signed a one-year deal with the Seattle Seahawks. Jackson competed with Brady Quinn for the backup quarterback spot behind starter Russell Wilson. To coincide with the signing of Jackson, the Seahawks released quarterback Jerrod Johnson. The Seahawks released quarterback Brady Quinn and made Jackson the official backup quarterback to Wilson. Jackson appeared in three games of the 2013 regular season producing 151 passing yards and a touchdown. During Super Bowl XLVIII against the Denver Broncos, Jackson came in relief of Russell Wilson during the fourth quarter, marking the first time in 13 years any backup quarterback played in a Super Bowl. The Seahawks won their first Super Bowl in franchise history as they defeated the Broncos 43–8. Following the season, Jackson signed a one-year deal to stay with the Seahawks. The Seahawks made it to Super Bowl XLIX, but failed to repeat as Super Bowl champions as they fell to the New England Patriots by a score of 28–24.

Following the 2015 season, Jackson became an unrestricted free agent. Seahawks coach Pete Carroll said that the team was interested in re-signing Jackson, though they ultimately opted to roster undrafted rookie Trevone Boykin as their backup quarterback the following season.

== Career statistics ==
=== NFL ===
Legend
	Won the Super Bowl
	Led the league
**Bold**	Career high

==== Regular season ====
Year	Team	Games			Passing									Rushing					Sacks		Fumbles	
Year	Team	GP	GS	Record	Cmp	Att	Pct	Yds	Avg	Lng	TD	Int	Rtg	Att	Yds	Avg	Lng	TD	Sck	SckY	Fum	Lost
2006	MIN	4	2	0–2	47	81	58.1	475	5.9	50	2	4	62.5	15	77	5.1	13	1	8	37	4	1
2007	MIN	12	12	**8–4**	171	294	58.2	1,911	6.5	**71**	9	12	70.8	**54**	**260**	4.8	32	**3**	19	70	5	3
2008	MIN	9	5	2–3	88	149	59.1	1,056	7.1	59	9	2	95.4	26	145	5.6	29	0	14	97	5	3
2009	MIN	8	0	–	14	21	66.7	201	9.6	34	1	0	113.4	17	-10	-0.6	6	0	0	0	0	0
2010	MIN	3	1	0–1	34	58	58.6	341	5.9	46	3	4	63.9	7	63	**9.0**	**33**	0	6	43	1	0
2011	SEA	**15**	**14**	7–7	**271**	**450**	60.2	**3,091**	6.9	61	**14**	**13**	79.2	40	108	2.7	13	1	**42**	**293**	**9**	**5**
2012	BUF	0	0	DNP																		
2013	SEA	3	0	–	10	13	**76.9**	151	**11.6**	35	1	0	**140.2**	4	1	0.3	5	1	6	0	0	0
2014	SEA	1	0	–	0	0	0.0	0	0.0	0	0	0	0.0	0	0	0.0	0	0	0	0	0	0
2015	SEA	4	0	–	4	6	66.7	37	6.2	17	0	0	83.3	8	-8	-1.0	-1	0	1	6	0	0
Career		59	34	17–17	640	1,073	59.6	7,263	6.8	71	39	35	78.5	171	638	3.7	33	6	90	546	24	12

==== Postseason ====
Year	Team	Games			Passing									Rushing					Sacks		Fumbles	
Year	Team	GP	GS	Record	Cmp	Att	Pct	Yds	Avg	Lng	TD	Int	Rtg	Att	Yds	Avg	Lng	TD	Sck	SckY	Fum	Lost
2008	MIN	**1**	**1**	0–1	**15**	**35**	**42.9**	**164**	**4.7**	**27**	0	**1**	**45.4**	**2**	**17**	**8.5**	**17**	0	**1**	**11**	**1**	0
2009	MIN	0	0	DNP																		
2013	SEA	**1**	0	–	0	1	0.0	0	0.0	0	0	0	39.6	0	0	0.0	0	0	0	0	0	0
2014	SEA	0	0	DNP																		
2015	SEA	0	0	DNP																		
Career		2	1	0–1	15	36	41.7	164	4.6	27	0	1	44.2	2	17	8.5	17	0	1	11	1	0

=== College ===
Year	Team	Passing							Rushing			
Year	Team	Cmp	Att	Pct	Yds	Y/A	TD	Int	Att	Yds	Avg	TD
2001	Arkansas	3	9	33.3	53	5.9	0	1	7	14	2.0	0
2002	Arkansas	14	39	35.9	143	3.7	1	2	14	-16	-1.1	0
2003	Alabama State	135	261	51.7	1,984	7.6	18	9	92	454	4.9	5
2004	Alabama State	183	350	52.3	2,562	7.3	20	9	67	215	3.2	3
2005	Alabama State	181	296	61.1	2,655	9.0	25	5	95	271	2.9	3
Total		516	955	54	7,397	6.7	64	26	275	938	3.14	11

== Coaching career ==
In 2018, Jackson took a graduate assistant role at Alabama State, his alma mater. In 2019, Jackson was named quarterbacks coach for Tennessee State.

== Personal life and death ==
Jackson was married and had three children.

Jackson was arrested on June 25, 2016, in Kissimmee, Florida, and charged with aggravated assault after police said he threatened his wife with a gun. After the arrest, Jackson publicly stated that he lacked the money to afford an attorney.

On April 12, 2020, Jackson was killed in a car crash at age 36. The Alabama Law Enforcement Agency said Jackson was killed in a single-car crash at 8:50 p.m. He had been driving in Pike Road, Alabama, when his 2012 Chevrolet Camaro drifted off the road, struck a tree and flipped. Jackson had been driving 70 mph in a 30 mph zone and was wearing a seatbelt.
