= 2007 Minnesota Vikings season =

NFL team season

- Owner: Zygi Wilf
- Head coach: Brad Childress
- Home stadium: Hubert H. Humphrey Metrodome

Results
- Record: 8–8
- Division place: 2nd NFC North
- Playoffs: Did not qualify
- All-Pros: 6: RB Adrian Peterson (2nd team); FB Tony Richardson (2nd team); G Steve Hutchinson (1st team); DT Kevin Williams (1st team); DT Pat Williams (2nd team); S Darren Sharper (2nd team)
- Pro Bowlers: 7: RB Adrian Peterson; FB Tony Richardson; G Steve Hutchinson; C Matt Birk (bench); DT Kevin Williams; DT Pat Williams; S Darren Sharper

Uniform
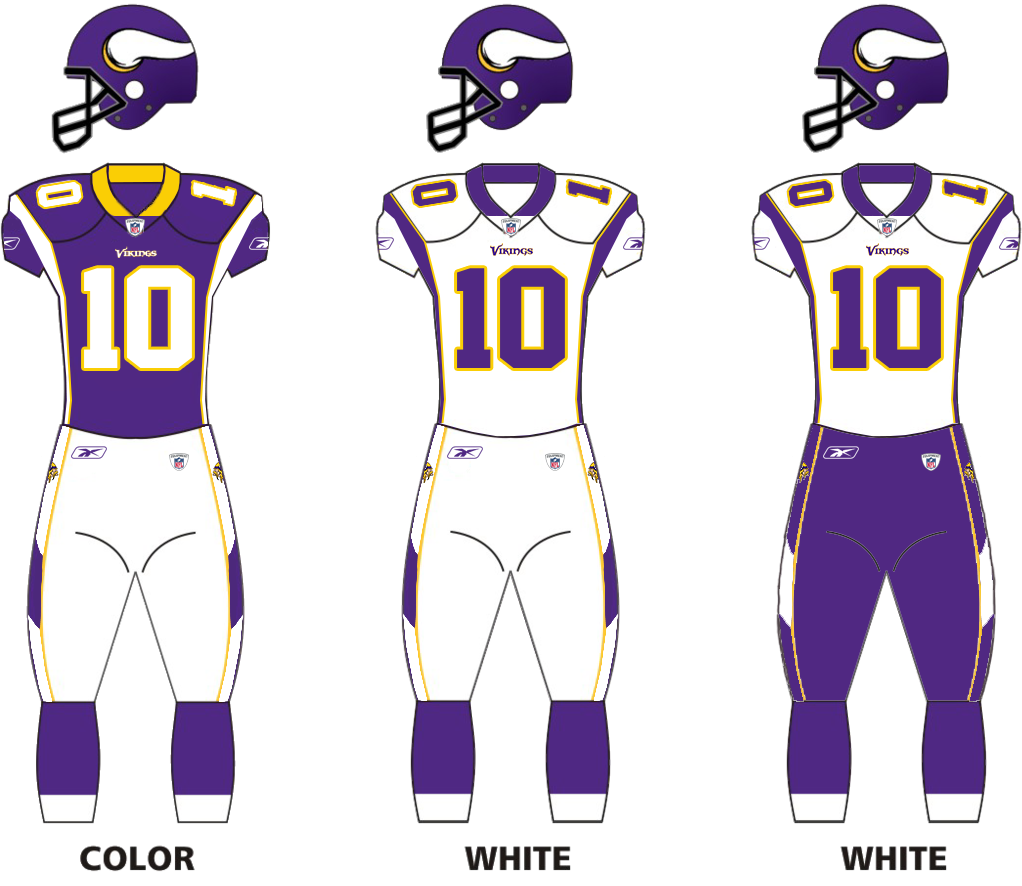

The 2007 season was the Minnesota Vikings' 47th in the National Football League (NFL). The Vikings' 8–8 record under second-year head coach Brad Childress was an improvement on their 6–10 record in 2006; nonetheless, for the third straight year, the Vikings failed to make the playoffs.

Although they had the worst pass defense in the NFL in 2007, surrendering 4,225 passing yards, the Vikings finished the season with the league's best defense against the run, allowing only 74.1 rushing yards per game, as well as the best rushing offense with running backs Adrian Peterson and Chester Taylor. Peterson was named the Offensive Rookie of the Year for 2007.

== Offseason ==
The Vikings began the 2007 offseason by losing their defensive coordinator, Mike Tomlin, who was hired to be the head coach of the Pittsburgh Steelers on January 21, 2007. Coach Brad Childress waited until after the Super Bowl to hire Leslie Frazier, who served as special assistant to the head coach/defensive backs coach under Tony Dungy at the Indianapolis Colts. Frazier became the Vikings' new defensive coordinator on February 8. Frazier played cornerback for the 1985 Chicago Bears, and had just won Super Bowl XLI over his former Bears team when he was hired by the Vikings.

=== 2007 draft ===
Pro Bowler
MVP

2007 Minnesota Vikings Draft
Draft order		Player name	Position	College	Contract	Notes
Round	Selection	Player name	Position	College	Contract	Notes
1	7	Adrian Peterson	Running back	Oklahoma	5 years	
2	41	Traded to the Atlanta Falcons (Note: The Vikings traded their second-round selection (41st overall) to the Falcons in exchange for second- and fourth-round selections (44th and 121st overall).)				
2	44	Sidney Rice	Wide receiver	South Carolina	4 years	From Falcons
3	72	Marcus McCauley	Cornerback	Fresno State	4 years	
4	102	Brian Robison	Defensive end	Texas	4 years	From Buccaneers (Note: The Vikings traded fourth- and sixth-round selections (106th and 182nd overall) to the Buccaneers in exchange for a fourth-round selection (102nd overall).)
4	106	Traded to the Tampa Bay Buccaneers				
4	121	Traded to the Denver Broncos (Note: The Vikings traded a fourth-round selection (121st overall) to the Broncos in exchange for sixth- and seventh-round selections (176th and 233rd overall), and a 2008 third-round selection.)				From Falcons
5	146	Aundrae Allison	Wide receiver	East Carolina	4 years	
6	176	Rufus Alexander	Linebacker	Oklahoma	4 years	From Lions, via Broncos
6	182	Traded to the Tampa Bay Buccaneers				
7	217	Tyler Thigpen	Quarterback	Coastal Carolina	4 years	
7	233	Chandler Williams	Wide receiver	FIU	4 years	From Broncos

=== Transactions ===
Re-signed
Player	Position	Status	Contract
Chris Kluwe	P	Free agent	1 year ($435,000)
Heath Farwell	LB	Free agent	1 year ($435,000)
Anthony Herrera	G	Free agent	1 year ($850,000)
Spencer Johnson	DT	Free agent	1 year ($850,000)
Richard Owens	TE	Free agent	1 year ($850,000)
Artose Pinner	RB	Free agent	1 year ($850,000)
Darrion Scott	DE	Free agent	1 year ($850,000)
Tank Williams	SS	Free agent	1 year ($595,000)
Drew Henson	QB	Free agent	1 year ($765,000)

Additions
Player	Position	Status (previous team)	Contract
Visanthe Shiancoe	TE	Free agent (NYG)	5 years ($18.2 million)
Vinny Ciurciu	LB	Free agent (CAR)	3 years ($3 million)
Bobby Wade	WR	Free agent (TEN)	5 years ($15 million)
Mike Doss	S	Free agent (IND)	1 year ($1 million)

Departures
Player	Position	Status (new team)	Contract
Jason Whittle	G	Free agent (BUF)	1 year ($720,000)
Fred Smoot	CB	Free agent (WAS)	5 years ($25 million)
Brad Johnson	QB	Free agent (DAL)	3 years ($7.5 million)
Napoleon Harris	LB	Free agent (KC)	6 years ($24 million)
Bethel Johnson	WR	Free agent (PHI)	1 year
Jermaine Wiggins	TE	Free agent (JAC)	1 year ($1 million)

== Staff ==
2007 Minnesota Vikings staff
Front office: Owner/chairman – Zygi Wilf; Owner/president – Mark Wilf; Owner/vice chairman – Leonard Wilf; Vice president of football operations – Rob Brzezinski; Vice president of player personnel – Rick Spielman; Director of player personnel – George Paton; Director of college scouting – Scott Studwell; Assistant director of college scouting – Jamaal Stephenson; Head coaches: Head coach – Brad Childress; Assistant to the head coach – Kevin Stefanski; Coaches administrative assistant – Todd Nielson; Offensive coaches: Offensive coordinator – Darrell Bevell; Quarterbacks – Kevin Rogers; Running backs – Eric Bieniemy; Assistant running backs – Ryan Ficken; Wide receivers – George Stewart; Assistant wide receivers/offensive assistant – Chad O’Shea; Tight ends – Jimmie Johnson; Offensive line – Pat Morris; Assistant offensive line – Jim Hueber	Defensive coaches: Defensive coordinator – Leslie Frazier; Defensive line – Karl Dunbar; Assistant defensive line – Brendan Daly; Linebackers – Fred Pagac; Defensive backs/secondary – Joe Woods; Assistant secondary – Derek Mason; Defensive assistant – Jeff Imamura; Special teams coaches: Special teams coordinator – Paul Ferraro; Assistant special teams – Brian Murphy; Strength and conditioning: Head athletic trainer/director of sports medicine – Eric Sugarman; Strength and conditioning – Tom Kanavy; Assistant strength and conditioning – Martin Streight; Assistant strength and conditioning – Juney Barnett; Strength and conditioning intern – Chris DiSanto

== Roster ==
2007 Minnesota Vikings roster
Quarterbacks (QB): 9 Brooks Bollinger; 13 Kelly Holcomb; 7 Tarvaris Jackson; Running backs (RB): 45 Garrett Mills; 30 Mewelde Moore PR; 28 Adrian Peterson KR; 49 Tony Richardson FB; 38 Naufahu Tahi FB; 29 Chester Taylor; Wide receivers (WR): 84 Aundrae Allison KR; 89 Robert Ferguson; 18 Sidney Rice; 19 Bobby Wade PR; 82 Troy Williamson KR; Tight ends (TE): 83 Jeff Dugan; 40 Jim Kleinsasser; 81 Visanthe Shiancoe	Offensive linemen (OL): 78 Matt Birk C; 62 Ryan Cook T; 64 Anthony Herrera G; 79 Artis Hicks G; 76 Steve Hutchinson G; 75 Chase Johnson T; 72 Marcus Johnson T; 74 Bryant McKinnie T; Defensive linemen (DL): 90 Fred Evans DT; 73 Otis Grigsby DE; 97 Spencer Johnson DT; 92 Jayme Mitchell DE; 96 Brian Robison DE; 95 Kenechi Udeze DE; 93 Kevin Williams DT; 94 Pat Williams DT	Linebackers (LB): 50 Vinny Ciurciu OLB; 59 Heath Farwell OLB; 52 Chad Greenway OLB; 56 E. J. Henderson MLB; 58 David Herron MLB; 51 Ben Leber OLB; 56 Dontarrious Thomas; Defensive backs (DB): 21 Mike Doss FS; 37 Eric Frampton SS; 41 Charles Gordon CB; 23 Cedric Griffin CB; 31 Marcus McCauley CB; 42 Darren Sharper SS; 20 Dwight Smith FS; 27 Ronyell Whitaker CB; 25 Tank Williams FS; 26 Antoine Winfield CB; Special teams (ST): 5 Chris Kluwe P; 46 Cullen Loeffler LS; 8 Ryan Longwell K	Practice squad: 63 Brian Daniels G; 34 Tyler Everett S; 66 Seppo Evwaraye G ^{Int'l}; 17 Joel Filani WR; 61 Alex Guerrero DT; 32 Dee McCann CB; 15 Martin Nance WR; 85 Justin Surrency WR; 24 Arkee Whitlock RB; Reserve: 57 Rufus Alexander LB (IR); 91 Ray Edwards DE (Susp.); 99 Erasmus James DE (IR); 47 Braden Jones TE (IR); 67 Dan Mozes C (IR); 98 Darrion Scott DE (IR); Rookies in italics 53 active, 6 reserve, 9 practice squad

== Preseason ==
=== Schedule ===
Week	Date	Opponent	Result	Record	Venue	NFL.com recap
1	August 10	St. Louis Rams	L 10–13	0–1	Hubert H. Humphrey Metrodome	Recap
2	August 17	at New York Jets	W 37–20	1–1	Giants Stadium	Recap
3	August 25	at Seattle Seahawks	L 13–30	1–2	Qwest Field	Recap
4	August 30	Dallas Cowboys	W 23–14	2–2	Hubert H. Humphrey Metrodome	Recap

=== Game summaries ===
==== Week 1: vs. St. Louis Rams ====
Preseason Week 1: St. Louis Rams at Minnesota Vikings – Game summary

Quarter	1	2	3	4	Total
Rams	0	7	0	6	13
Vikings	0	3	7	0	10

at Hubert H. Humphrey Metrodome, Minneapolis, Minnesota

- Date: August 10
- Game time: 7:10 p.m. CDT
- Game weather: None (indoor stadium)
- Game attendance: 62,666
- Referee: Ed Hochuli (85)
- Recap, Game Book

Game information

First quarter

- No scoring plays.

Second quarter

- MIN – Ryan Longwell 30-yard field goal, 9:30. Vikings 3–0. Drive: 13 plays, 65 yards, 7:03.
- STL – Brian Leonard 10-yard run (Kevin Lovell kick), 4:11. Rams 7–3. Drive: 11 plays, 73 yards, 5:19.

Third quarter

- MIN – Dontarrious Thomas 82-yard interception return (Ryan Longwell kick), 9:49. Vikings 10–7.

Fourth quarter

- STL – Kevin Lovell 39-yard field goal, 13:08. Tied 10–10. Drive: 13 plays, 59 yards, 6:22.
- STL – Kevin Lovell 40-yard field goal, 0:00. Rams 13–10. Drive: 9 plays, 46 yards, 2:52.

Top passers

- STL – Ryan Fitzpatrick – 13/21, 117 yards, 2 INT
- MIN – Tarvaris Jackson – 8/11, 83 yards

Top rushers

- STL – Brian Leonard – 9 rushes, 36 yards, TD
- MIN – Adrian Peterson – 11 rushes, 33 yards

Top receivers

- STL – Derek Stanley – 4 receptions, 61 yards
- MIN – Bobby Wade – 2 receptions, 42 yards

==== Week 2: at New York Jets ====
Preseason Week 2: Minnesota Vikings at New York Jets – Game summary

Quarter	1	2	3	4	Total
Vikings	14	10	10	3	37
Jets	3	10	0	7	20

at Giants Stadium, East Rutherford, New Jersey

- Date: August 17
- Game time: 8:10 p.m. CDT/7:10 p.m. CDT
- Game weather: Overcast, 67 °F (19 °C)
- Game attendance: 75,851
- Referee: Jeff Triplette (42)
- Recap, Game Book

Game information

First quarter

- MIN – Darren Sharper 40-yard interception return (Ryan Longwell kick), 11:24. Vikings 7–0.
- NYJ – Mike Nugent 19-yard field goal, 5:51. Vikings 7–3. Drive: 11 plays, 62 yards, 5:33.
- MIN – Chad Greenway 16-yard interception return (Ryan Longwell kick), 3:28. Vikings 14–3.

Second quarter

- NYJ – Mike Nugent 34-yard field goal, 14:21. Vikings 14–6. Drive: 7 plays, 35 yards, 4:07.
- MIN – Adrian Peterson 3-yard run (Ryan Longwell kick), 10:25. Vikings 21–6. Drive: 7 plays, 77 yards, 3:56.
- NYJ – Justin McCareins 35-yard pass from Kellen Clemens (Mike Nugent kick), 4:36. Vikings 21–13. Drive: 3 plays, 35 yards, 1:26.
- MIN – Ryan Longwell 54-yard field goal, 0:00. Vikings 24–13. Drive: 10 plays, 39 yards, 4:36.

Third quarter

- MIN – Brian Robison 3-yard fumble return (Ryan Longwell kick), 6:18. Vikings 31–13.
- MIN – Ryan Longwell 22-yard field goal, 2:07. Vikings 34–13. Drive: 7 plays, 36 yards, 2:57.

Fourth quarter

- NYJ – Jason Pociask 23-yard pass from Marques Tuiasosopo (Mike Nugent kick), 2:22. Vikings 34–20. Drive: 9 plays, 78 yards, 3:26.
- MIN – Ryan Longwell 27-yard field goal, 0:30. Vikings 37–20. Drive: 4 plays, 6 yards, 1:52.

Top passers

- MIN – Drew Henson – 4/9, 33 yards
- NYJ – Marques Tuiasosopo – 5/10, 64 yards, TD

Top rushers

- MIN – Adrian Peterson – 8 rushes, 70 yards, TD
- NYJ – Leon Washington – 11 rushes, 52 yards

Top receivers

- MIN – Chester Taylor – 1 reception, 18 yards
- NYJ – Justin McCareins – 3 receptions, 52 yards, TD

==== Week 3: at Seattle Seahawks ====
Preseason Week 3: Minnesota Vikings at Seattle Seahawks – Game summary

Quarter	1	2	3	4	Total
Vikings	0	10	3	0	13
Seahawks	6	10	7	7	30

at Qwest Field, Seattle, Washington

- Date: August 25
- Game time: 6:00 p.m. PDT/8:00 p.m. PDT
- Game weather: Partly cloudy, 68 °F (20 °C)
- Game attendance: 66,723
- Referee: Larry Nemmers (20)
- Recap, Game Book

Game information

First quarter

- SEA – Josh Brown 28-yard field goal, 13:30. Seahawks 3–0. Drive: 4 plays, 9 yards, 1:16.
- SEA – Josh Brown 22-yard field goal, 8:59. Seahawks 6–0. Drive: 6 plays, 31 yards, 2:05.

Second quarter

- SEA – Josh Brown 46-yard field goal, 12:57. Seahawks 9–0. Drive: 8 plays, 44 yards, 4:03.
- MIN – Visanthe Shiancoe 6-yard pass from Bobby Wade (Ryan Longwell kick), 8:32. Seahawks 9–7. Drive: 3 plays, 43 yards, 1:05.
- SEA – Shaun Alexander 1-yard run (Josh Brown kick), 3:28. Seahawks 16–7. Drive: 9 plays, 74 yards, 5:04.
- MIN – Ryan Longwell 47-yard field goal, 0:33. Seahawks 16–10. Drive: 10 plays, 45 yards, 2:55.

Third quarter

- MIN – Ryan Longwell 49-yard field goal, 0:30. Seahawks 16–13. Drive: 9 plays, 26 yards, 5:41.
- SEA – Ben Obomanu 57-yard pass from Seneca Wallace (Kurt Smith kick), 0:13. Seahawks 23–13. Drive: 1 play, 57 yards, 0:17.

Fourth quarter

- SEA – Kevin Hobbs 39-yard interception return (Kurt Smith kick), 14:04. Seahawks 30–13.

Top passers

- MIN – Tarvaris Jackson – 9/18, 117 yards
- SEA – Matt Hasselbeck – 12/17, 129 yards, INT

Top rushers

- MIN – Chester Taylor – 8 rushes, 61 yards
- SEA – Shaun Alexander – 8 rushes, 30 yards, TD

Top receivers

- MIN – Bobby Wade – 5 receptions, 85 yards
- SEA – Ben Obomanu – 1 reception, 57 yards, TD

==== Week 4: vs. Dallas Cowboys ====
Preseason Week 4: Dallas Cowboys at Minnesota Vikings – Game summary

Quarter	1	2	3	4	Total
Cowboys	7	7	0	0	14
Vikings	0	17	3	3	23

at Hubert H. Humphrey Metrodome, Minneapolis, Minnesota

- Date: August 30
- Game time: 7:10 p.m. CDT
- Game weather: None (indoor stadium)
- Game attendance: 62,938
- Referee: Tony Corrente (99)
- Recap, Game Book

Game information

First quarter

- DAL – Jerheme Urban 95-yard punt return (Nick Folk kick), 10:31. Cowboys 7–0.

Second quarter

- MIN – Artose Pinner 1-yard run (Ryan Longwell kick), 14:24. Tied 7–7. Drive: 8 plays, 58 yards, 3:20.
- MIN – Sidney Rice 4-yard pass from Brooks Bollinger (Ryan Longwell kick), 10:29. Vikings 14–7. Drive: 6 plays, 19 yards, 3:08.
- DAL – Tony Curtis 5-yard pass from Matt Moore (Nick Folk kick), 1:56. Tied 14–14. Drive: 9 plays, 43 yards, 5:25.
- MIN – Ryan Longwell 47-yard field goal, 0:03. Vikings 17–14. Drive: 8 plays, 53 yards, 1:53.

Third quarter

- MIN – Ryan Longwell 27-yard field goal, 9:43. Vikings 20–14. Drive: 10 plays, 60 yards, 5:17.

Fourth quarter

- MIN – Ryan Longwell 37-yard field goal, 8:48. Vikings 23–14. Drive: 8 plays, 25 yards, 3:18.

Top passers

- DAL – Matt Moore – 14/19, 94 yards, TD
- MIN – Brooks Bollinger – 9/15, 109 yards, TD

Top rushers

- DAL – Alonzo Coleman – 4 rushes, 12 yards
- MIN – Artose Pinner – 12 rushes, 34 yards, TD

Top receivers

- DAL – Tony Curtis – 5 receptions, 44 yards, TD
- MIN – Robert Ferguson – 1 reception, 38 yards

== Regular season ==
=== Schedule ===
Week	Date	Opponent	Result	Record	Venue	NFL.com recap
1	September 9	Atlanta Falcons	**W** 24–3	1–0	Hubert H. Humphrey Metrodome	Recap
2	September 16	at **Detroit Lions**	**L** 17–20 (OT)	1–1	Ford Field	Recap
3	September 23	at Kansas City Chiefs	**L** 10–13	1–2	Arrowhead Stadium	Recap
4	September 30	**Green Bay Packers**	**L** 16–23	1–3	Hubert H. Humphrey Metrodome	Recap
5	Bye					
6	October 14	at **Chicago Bears**	**W** 34–31	2–3	Soldier Field	Recap
7	October 21	at Dallas Cowboys	**L** 14–24	2–4	Texas Stadium	Recap
8	October 28	Philadelphia Eagles	**L** 16–23	2–5	Hubert H. Humphrey Metrodome	Recap
9	November 4	San Diego Chargers	**W** 35–17	3–5	Hubert H. Humphrey Metrodome	Recap
10	November 11	at **Green Bay Packers**	**L** 0–34	3–6	Lambeau Field	Recap
11	November 18	Oakland Raiders	**W** 29–22	4–6	Hubert H. Humphrey Metrodome	Recap
12	November 25	at New York Giants	**W** 41–17	5–6	Giants Stadium	Recap
13	December 2	**Detroit Lions**	**W** 42–10	6–6	Hubert H. Humphrey Metrodome	Recap
14	December 9	at San Francisco 49ers	**W** 27–7	7–6	Bill Walsh Field at Monster Park	Recap
15	December 17	**Chicago Bears**	**W** 20–13	8–6	Hubert H. Humphrey Metrodome	Recap
16	December 23	Washington Redskins	**L** 21–32	8–7	Hubert H. Humphrey Metrodome	Recap
17	December 30	at Denver Broncos	**L** 19–22 (OT)	8–8	Invesco Field	Recap

Note: Intra-division opponents are in bold text.

=== Game summaries ===
==== Week 1: vs. Atlanta Falcons ====
Week 1: Atlanta Falcons at Minnesota Vikings – Game summary

Quarter	1	2	3	4	Total
Falcons	0	0	0	3	**3**
**Vikings**	7	0	3	14	**24**

at Hubert H. Humphrey Metrodome, Minneapolis

- Date: September 9
- Game time: 1:00 p.m. EDT/12:00 p.m. CDT
- Game weather: Indoors
- Game attendance: 62,815
- Referee: John Parry
- TV announcers (Fox): Ron Pitts (play-by-play), Tony Boselli (color commentator), and Dawn Mitchell (sideline reporter)
- Recap, Game Book

Game information

**First quarter**

- MIN – Kevin Williams 54-yard interception return (Ryan Longwell kick), 7:43. Vikings 7–0.

**Second quarter**

- No scoring plays.

**Third quarter**

- MIN – Ryan Longwell 49-yard field goal, 1:46. Vikings 10–0. **Drive: 10 plays, 60 yards, 4:17.**

**Fourth quarter**

- ATL – Matt Prater 45-yard field goal, 9:23. Vikings 10–3. **Drive: 13 plays, 47 yards, 7:23.**
- MIN – Adrian Peterson 60-yard pass from Tarvaris Jackson (Ryan Longwell kick), 7:19. Vikings 17–3. **Drive: 4 plays, 80 yards, 2:04.**
- MIN – Antoine Winfield 14-yard interception return (Ryan Longwell kick), 2:37. Vikings 24–3.

**Top passers**

- ATL – Joey Harrington – 23/32, 199 yards, 2 INT
- MIN – Tarvaris Jackson – 13/23, 163 yards, TD, INT

**Top rushers**

- ATL – Warrick Dunn – 22 rushes, 55 yards
- MIN – Adrian Peterson – 19 rushes, 103 yards

**Top receivers**

- ATL – Alge Crumpler – 4 receptions, 40 yards
- MIN – Adrian Peterson – 1 reception, 60 yards, TD

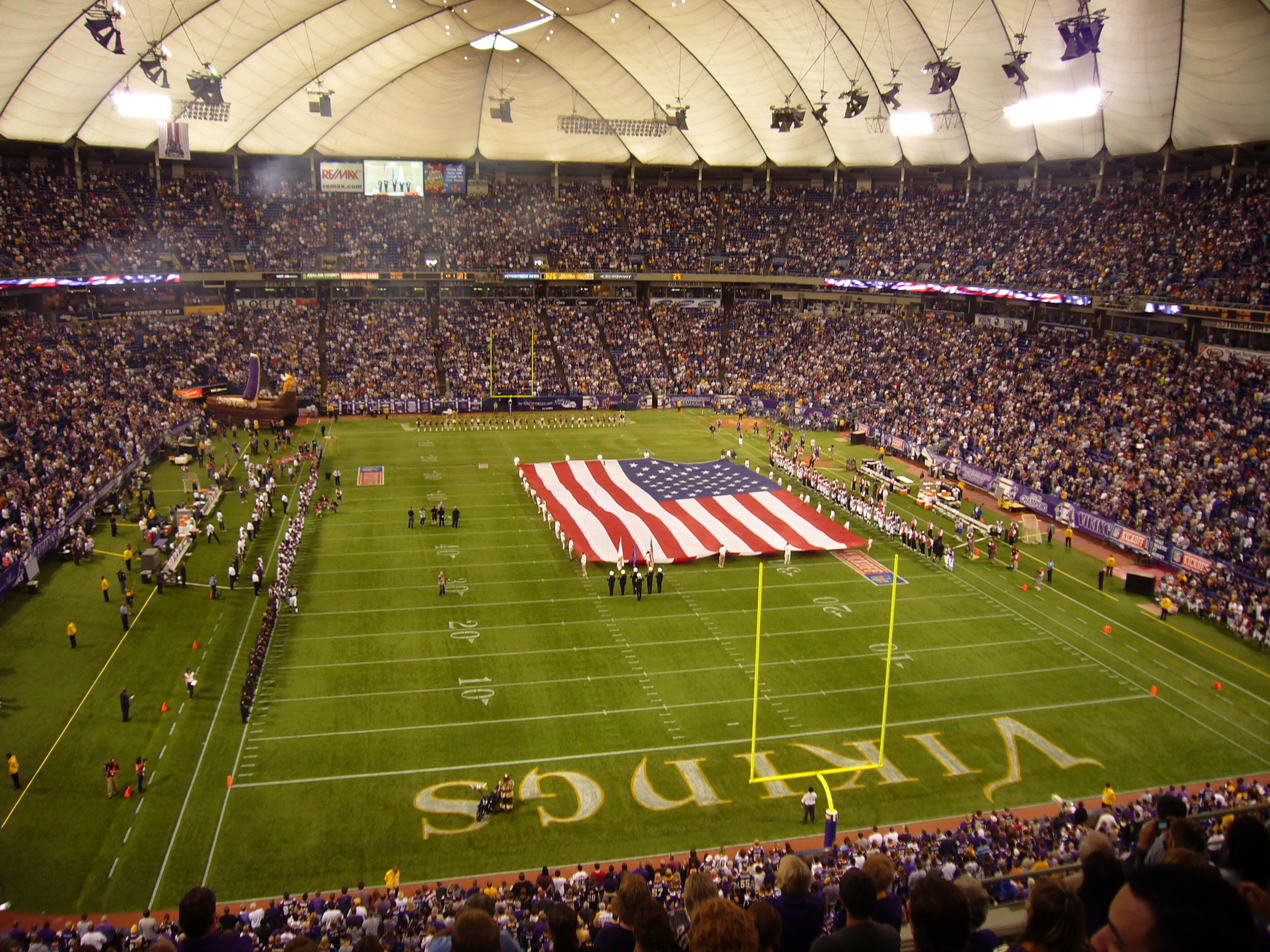
The Vikings 2007 opener at the HHH Metrodome

The Vikings began their 2007 campaign at home against the Atlanta Falcons. In the first quarter, Minnesota scored first with defensive tackle Kevin Williams returning an interception 54 yards for a touchdown. It was the only score of the first half. In the third quarter, kicker Ryan Longwell kicked a 49-yard field goal. In the fourth quarter, the Falcons got their only score of the game, with Matt Prater kicking a 45-yard field goal. From there, the Vikings had the only offense with Tarvaris Jackson throwing a 60-yard touchdown pass to rookie running back Adrian Peterson. Cornerback Antoine Winfield returned an interception 14 yards for a touchdown.

==== Week 2: at Detroit Lions ====
Week 2: Minnesota Vikings at Detroit Lions – Game summary

Quarter	1	2	3	4	OT	Total
Vikings	0	7	10	0	0	**17**
**Lions**	0	10	7	0	3	**20**

at Ford Field, Detroit

- Date: September 16
- Game time: 4:05 p.m. EDT/3:05 p.m. CDT
- Game weather: Indoors
- Game attendance: 61,771
- Referee: Bill Leavy
- TV announcers (Fox): Matt Vasgersian (play-by-play), J.C. Pearson (color commentator), and Jennifer Hammond (sideline reporter)
- Recap, Game Book

Game information

**First quarter**

- No scoring plays.

**Second quarter**

- DET – Roy Williams 9-yard pass from Jon Kitna (Jason Hanson kick), 11:09. Lions 7–0. **Drive: 6 plays, 51 yards, 3:39.**
- MIN – Tarvaris Jackson 1-yard run (Ryan Longwell kick), 8:25. Tied 7–7. **Drive: 7 plays, 43 yards, 2:44.**
- DET – Jason Hanson 30-yard field goal, 1:06. Lions 10–7. **Drive: 8 plays, 55 yards, 2:24.**

**Third quarter**

- DET – Calvin Johnson 7-yard pass from J. T. O'Sullivan (Jason Hanson kick), 10:06. Lions 17–7. **Drive: 7 plays, 31 yards, 3:23.**
- MIN – Ryan Longwell 32-yard field goal, 5:57. Lions 17–10. **Drive: 8 plays, 27 yards, 4:09.**
- MIN – Ray Edwards 9-yard fumble return (Ryan Longwell kick), 5:08. Tied 17–17.

**Fourth quarter**

- No scoring plays.

**Overtime**

- DET – Jason Hanson 37-yard field goal, 8:55. Lions 20–17. **Drive: 5 plays, 31 yards, 2:40.**

**Top passers**

- MIN – Tarvaris Jackson – 17/33, 166 yards, 4 INT
- DET – Jon Kitna – 22/32, 245 yards, TD, INT

**Top rushers**

- MIN – Adrian Peterson – 20 rushes, 66 yards
- DET – Brian Calhoun – 5 rushes, 22 yards

**Top receivers**

- MIN – Adrian Peterson – 4 receptions, 52 yards
- DET – Roy Williams – 7 receptions, 111 yards, TD

Following their home win over the Falcons, the Vikings flew to Ford Field for a Week 2 divisional match-up with the Detroit Lions. After a scoreless first quarter, Minnesota trailed early as Lions quarterback Jon Kitna completed a 9-yard touchdown pass to wide receiver Roy Williams. The Vikings tied the game with a 1-yard touchdown run from quarterback Tarvaris Jackson. However, Detroit retook the lead with kicker Jason Hanson's 30-yard field goal.

In the third quarter, the Lions increased their lead with a 7-yard touchdown pass from J. T. O'Sullivan – who was in for the injured Kitna – to Calvin Johnson. Minnesota tied the game through a 32-yard field goal from Ryan Longwell and a 9-yard fumble return touchdown from defensive end Ray Edwards. After both teams failed to score in the fourth quarter, the Vikings received the ball first to begin overtime. However, nine plays into the Vikings' drive, Detroit recovered a fumble by backup Vikings quarterback Brooks Bollinger for the game's 10th overall turnover, allowing Hanson's to kick a 37-yard, game-winning field goal.

==== Week 3: at Kansas City Chiefs ====
Week 3: Minnesota Vikings at Kansas City Chiefs – Game summary

Quarter	1	2	3	4	Total
Vikings	7	3	0	0	**10**
**Chiefs**	0	3	3	7	**13**

at Arrowhead Stadium, Kansas City, Missouri

- Date: September 23
- Game time: 1:00 p.m. EDT/12:00 p.m. CDT
- Game weather: Clear, 83 °F (28 °C)
- Game attendance: 78,038
- Referee: Walt Anderson
- TV announcers (Fox): Matt Vasgersian (play-by-play), J. C. Pearson (color commentator), and Jennifer Hammond (sideline reporter)
- Recap, Game Book

Game information

**First quarter**

- MIN – Adrian Peterson 11-yard run (Ryan Longwell kick), 10:02. Vikings 7–0. **Drive: 6 plays, 50 yards, 3:18.**

**Second quarter**

- MIN – Ryan Longwell 22-yard field goal, 9:18. Vikings 10–0. **Drive: 5 plays, 29 yards, 1:21.**
- KC – Dave Rayner 39-yard field goal, 3:32. Vikings 10–3. **Drive: 7 plays, 7 yards, 2:40.**

**Third quarter**

- KC – Dave Rayner 49-yard field goal, 2:58. Vikings 10–6. **Drive: 13 plays, 61 yards, 6:21.**

**Fourth quarter**

- KC – Dwayne Bowe 16-yard pass from Damon Huard (Dave Rayner kick), 9:23. Chiefs 13–10. **Drive: 12 plays, 84 yards, 5:47.**

**Top passers**

- MIN – Kelly Holcomb – 14/28, 169 yards
- KC – Damon Huard – 20/29, 206 yards, TD

**Top rushers**

- MIN – Adrian Peterson – 25 rushes, 102 yards, TD
- KC – Larry Johnson – 24 rushes, 42 yards

**Top receivers**

- MIN – Visanthe Shiancoe – 3 receptions, 51 yards
- KC – Tony Gonzalez – 7 receptions, 96 yards

Following their divisional road loss to the Lions, the Vikings flew to Arrowhead Stadium for an interconference duel with the Kansas City Chiefs. In the first quarter, the Vikings' rookie running back Adrian Peterson got an 11-yard touchdown run for the only score of the period. In the second quarter, Minnesota increased their lead via a 22-yard Ryan Longwell field goal. The Chiefs ended the half with kicker Dave Rayner getting a 39-yard field goal.

In the second half, Kansas City were the only team to score. In the third quarter, the Chiefs drew closer with Rayner kicking a 49-yard field goal, before closing out the win in the fourth quarter with quarterback Damon Huard completing a 16-yard touchdown pass to Dwayne Bowe.

==== Week 4: vs. Green Bay Packers ====
Week 4: Green Bay Packers at Minnesota Vikings – Game summary

Quarter	1	2	3	4	Total
**Packers**	7	3	3	10	**23**
Vikings	0	6	3	7	**16**

at Hubert H. Humphrey Metrodome, Minneapolis, Minnesota

- Date: September 30
- Game time: 1:05 p.m. EDT/12:05 p.m. CDT
- Game weather: Indoors
- Game attendance: 63,779
- Referee: Ed Hochuli
- TV announcers (Fox): Ron Pitts (play-by-play) and J.C. Pearson (color commentator)
- Recap, Game Book

Game information

**First quarter**

- GB – Greg Jennings 16-yard pass from Brett Favre (Mason Crosby kick), 4:56. Packers 7–0. **Drive: 4 plays, 46 yards, 2:01.**

**Second quarter**

- MIN – Ryan Longwell 44-yard field goal, 5:19. Packers 7–3. **Drive: 6 plays, 66 yards, 2:18.**
- MIN – Ryan Longwell 35-yard field goal, 1:56. Packers 7–6. **Drive: 5 plays, 41 yards, 2:22.**
- GB – Mason Crosby 28-yard field goal, 0:02. Packers 10–6. **Drive: 11 plays, 66 yards, 1:54.**

**Third quarter**

- GB – Mason Crosby 44-yard field goal, 6:04. Packers 13–6. **Drive: 16 plays, 54 yards, 8:56.**
- MIN – Ryan Longwell 48-yard field goal, 3:18. Packers 13–9. **Drive: 8 plays, 50 yards, 2:46.**

**Fourth quarter**

- GB – Mason Crosby 33-yard field goal, 12:44. Packers 16–9. **Drive: 6 plays, 19 yards, 2:26.**
- GB – James Jones 33-yard pass from Brett Favre (Mason Crosby kick), 5:46. Packers 23–9. **Drive: 11 plays, 82 yards, 5:17.**
- MIN – Sidney Rice 15-yard pass from Kelly Holcomb (Ryan Longwell kick), 1:55. Packers 23–16. **Drive: 12 plays, 72 yards, 3:51.**

**Top passers**

- GB – Brett Favre – 32/45, 344 yards, 2 TD
- MIN – Kelly Holcomb – 21/39, 258 yards, TD, INT

**Top rushers**

- GB – DeShawn Wynn – 10 rushes, 20 yards
- MIN – Adrian Peterson – 12 rushes, 112 yards

**Top receivers**

- GB – Donald Lee – 4 receptions, 66 yards
- MIN – Bobby Wade – 5 receptions, 83 yards

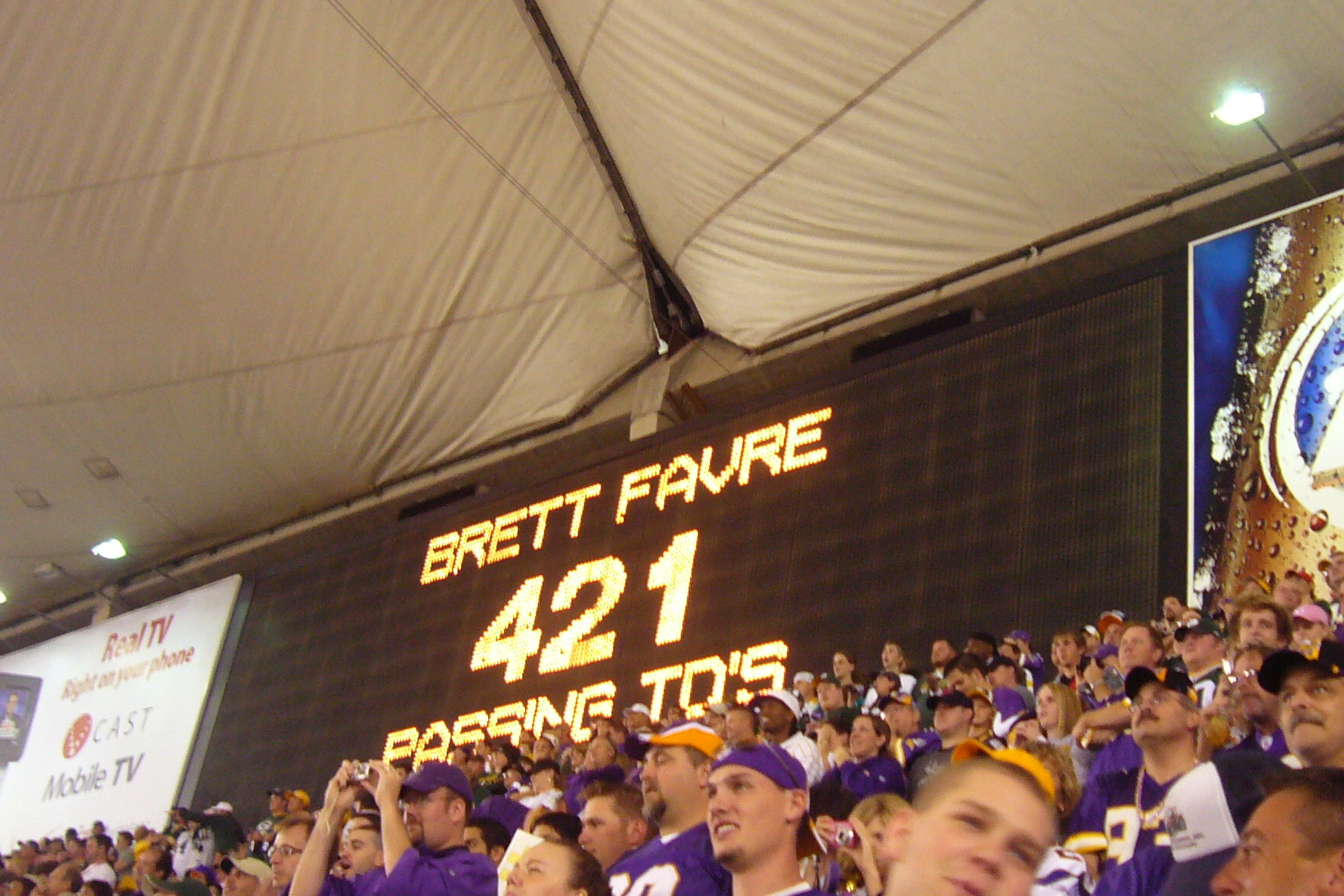
Packers QB Brett Favre broke Dan Marino's TD pass record during Week 4 at the Metrodome.

Trying to snap a two-game losing streak, the Vikings returned home for an NFC North duel with the Green Bay Packers. With regular starting quarterback Tarvaris Jackson recovering from injuries, Kelly Holcomb started in his place. In the first quarter, the Vikings trailed early as Brett Favre threw a 16-yard touchdown pass to Greg Jennings, surpassing Dan Marino with the 421st touchdown pass of his career. After Favre was honored for his accomplishment, Minnesota narrowed the margin between the two teams to a single point with field goals of 44 and 35 yards from kicker Ryan Longwell, before Mason Crosby hit a 28-yard field goal to restore a four-point lead for the Packers going into halftime.

In the third quarter, Crosby and Longwell cancelled each other out with field goals from 44 yards and 48 yards, respectively. In the fourth quarter, Crosby made a 33-yard field goal, before Favre completed a 33-yard touchdown pass to James Jones. Minnesota tried to rebound with Holcomb completing a 15-yard touchdown pass to rookie wide receiver Sidney Rice. The Vikings failed with an attempted onside kick, but two plays later Chad Greenway recovered a fumble by Favre, giving the Vikings just under 2 minutes to go 54 yards for a game-tying touchdown. However, after moving into Green Bay territory, Holcomb was subsequently intercepted by Atari Bigby, allowing Favre to kneel out the game.

Adrian Peterson ran 12 times for 112 yards, making him the first rookie running back since Chuck Foreman to rush for 100 yards in each of his first three games as a Vikings starter.

==== Week 6: at Chicago Bears ====
Week 6: Minnesota Vikings at Chicago Bears – Game summary

Quarter	1	2	3	4	Total
**Vikings**	7	7	7	13	**34**
Bears	7	7	0	17	**31**

at Soldier Field, Chicago

- Date: October 14
- Game time: 1:00 p.m. EDT/12:00 p.m. CDT
- Game weather: Sunny, 55 °F (13 °C)
- Game attendance: 62,174
- Referee: Gene Steratore
- TV announcers (Fox): Dick Stockton (play-by-play) and Brian Baldinger (color commentator)
- Recap, Game Book

Game information

**First quarter**

- CHI – Devin Hester 89-yard punt return (Robbie Gould kick), 1:56. Bears 7–0.
- MIN – Troy Williamson 60-yard pass from Tarvaris Jackson (Ryan Longwell kick), 0:00. Tied 7–7. **Drive: 4 plays, 74 yards, 1:56.**

**Second quarter**

- CHI – Bernard Berrian 39-yard pass from Brian Griese (Robbie Gould), 11:45. Bears 14–7. **Drive: 6 plays, 67 yards, 3:15.**
- MIN – Adrian Peterson 67-yard run (Ryan Longwell kick), 2:19. Tied 14–14. **Drive: 4 plays, 80 yards, 2:03.**

**Third quarter**

- MIN – Adrian Peterson 73-yard run (Ryan Longwell kick), 2:31. Vikings 21–14. **Drive: 3 plays, 88 yards, 1:35.**

**Fourth quarter**

- MIN – Ryan Longwell 48-yard field goal, 11:31. Vikings 24–14. **Drive: 9 plays, 34 yards, 3:29.**
- CHI – Robbie Gould 32-yard field goal, 8:37. Vikings 24–17. **Drive: 7 plays, 44 yards, 2:54.**
- MIN – Adrian Peterson 35-yard run (Ryan Longwell kick), 4:10. Vikings 31–17. **Drive: 8 plays, 68 yards, 4:27.**
- CHI – Muhsin Muhammad 33-yard pass from Brian Griese (Robbie Gould kick), 2:36. Vikings 31–24. **Drive: 3 plays, 53 yards, 0:20.**
- CHI – Devin Hester 81-yard pass from Brian Griese (Robbie Gould kick), 1:38. Tied 31–31. **Drive: 2 plays, 81 yards, 0:15.**
- MIN – Ryan Longwell 55-yard field goal, 0:00. Vikings 34–31. **Drive: 4 plays, 1 yard, 1:38.**

**Top passers**

- MIN – Tarvaris Jackson – 9/23, 136 yards, TD
- CHI – Brian Griese – 26/45, 381 yards, 3 TD, 2 INT

**Top rushers**

- MIN – Adrian Peterson – 20 rushes, 224 yards, 3 TD
- CHI – Cedric Benson – 18 rushes, 67 yards

**Top receivers**

- MIN – Troy Williamson – 2 receptions, 69 yards, TD
- CHI – Devin Hester – 1 reception, 81 yards, TD

Coming off their bye week, the Vikings went to Soldier Field for a Week 6 NFC North contest against the Chicago Bears. In the first quarter, Minnesota trailed early as Devin Hester returned a punt 89 yards for a touchdown. The Vikings responded with a 60-yard touchdown pass from Tarvaris Jackson to Troy Williamson. In the second quarter, Chicago's Brian Griese completed a 39-yard touchdown pass to Bernard Berrian. Afterwards, Minnesota answered with a 67-yard touchdown run from Adrian Peterson.

In the third quarter, the Vikings took the lead with 73-yard touchdown run from Peterson for the only score of the period. Kickers Ryan Longwell and Robbie Gould traded field goals of 48 and 32 yards to start the fourth quarter, before Peterson scored his third touchdown of the game on a 35-yard run. Chicago tied the game again with Griese completing a 33-yard touchdown pass to Muhsin Muhammad, followed by an 81-yard touchdown pass to Hester. But on the ensuing kickoff, Peterson sprinted all the way down to the Chicago 38-yard line, setting Longwell up for a 55-yard, game-winning field goal.

With the win, the Vikings improved to 2–3, largely in part to Peterson's 224 rushing yards, which put him fifth for the most rookie rushing yards in one game. Up to this point, he had a total of 607 rushing yards, which placed him second for the most rookie rushing yards through the first five games, only behind Eric Dickerson. He also broke the NFL record for most all purpose yards in a single game, with 361.

==== Week 7: at Dallas Cowboys ====
Week 7: Minnesota Vikings at Dallas Cowboys – Game summary

Quarter	1	2	3	4	Total
Vikings	7	7	0	0	**14**
**Cowboys**	7	0	14	3	**24**

at Texas Stadium, Irving, Texas

- Date: October 21
- Game time: 4:15 p.m. EDT/3:15 p.m. CDT
- Game weather: 88 °F (31 °C)
- Game attendance: 63,432
- Referee: Walt Coleman
- TV announcers (Fox): Kenny Albert (play-by-play) and Troy Aikman (color commentator)
- Recap, Game Book

Game information

**First quarter**

- DAL – Terrell Owens 5-yard pass from Tony Romo (Nick Folk kick), 6:36. Cowboys 7–0. **Drive: 14 plays, 80 yards, 8:24.**
- MIN – Adrian Peterson 20-yard run (Ryan Longwell kick), 0:43. Tied 7–7. **Drive: 11 plays, 69 yards, 5:53.**

**Second quarter**

- MIN – Cedric Griffin 28-yard fumble return (Ryan Longwell kick), 1:39. Vikings 14–7.

**Third quarter**

- DAL – Marion Barber III 1-yard run (Nick Folk kick), 6:55. Tied 14–14. **Drive: 5 plays, 36 yards, 2:41.**
- DAL – Pat Watkins 68-yard return of blocked field goal (Nick Folk kick), 2:52. Cowboys 21–14.

**Fourth quarter**

- DAL – Nick Folk 45-yard field goal, 10:34. Cowboys 24–14. **Drive: 4 plays, −5 yards, 1:17.**

**Top passers**

- MIN – Tarvaris Jackson – 6/19, 72 yards
- DAL – Tony Romo – 31/39, 277 yards, TD

**Top rushers**

- MIN – Adrian Peterson – 12 rushes, 63 yards, TD
- DAL – Marion Barber III – 19 rushes, 96 yards, TD

**Top receivers**

- MIN – Troy Williamson – 1 reception, 25 yards
- DAL – Terrell Owens – 7 receptions, 103 yards, TD

Coming off their impressive divisional road win over the Bears, the Vikings flew to Texas Stadium for a Week 7 intraconference duel with the Dallas Cowboys. In the first quarter, Minnesota trailed early as Cowboys quarterback Tony Romo completed a 5-yard touchdown pass to Terrell Owens. The Vikings responded with a 20-yard touchdown run from Adrian Peterson. In the second quarter, Minnesota scored a bizarre defensive touchdown, as Antoine Winfield forced a fumble from Cowboys receiver Patrick Crayton; linebacker Ben Leber recovered the ball and ran with it before lateraling it to Cedric Griffin; Griffin then also fumbled the ball, but it bobbled back up into his hands and he was able to run it in for a touchdown.

In the third quarter, the Vikings began to struggle as Cowboys running back Marion Barber III scored a 1-yard touchdown, before safety Pat Watkins returned a blocked field goal 68 yards for a touchdown. In the fourth quarter, Dallas closed out the win with kicker Nick Folk getting a 45-yard field goal.

==== Week 8: vs. Philadelphia Eagles ====
Week 8: Philadelphia Eagles at Minnesota Vikings – Game summary

Quarter	1	2	3	4	Total
**Eagles**	3	14	3	3	**23**
Vikings	7	3	3	3	**16**

at Hubert H. Humphrey Metrodome, Minneapolis

- Date: October 28
- Game time: 1:00 p.m. EDT/12:00 p.m. CDT
- Game weather: Indoors
- Game attendance: 63,019
- Referee: Bill Carollo
- TV announcers (Fox): Dick Stockton (play-by-play) and Brian Baldinger (color commentator)
- Recap, Game Book

Game information

**First quarter**

- MIN – Visanthe Shiancoe 9-yard pass from Kelly Holcomb (Ryan Longwell kick), 6:42. Vikings 7–0. **Drive: 11 plays, 79 yards, 5:52.**
- PHI – David Akers 20-yard field goal, 0:45. Vikings 7–3. **Drive: 10 plays, 72 yards, 4:47.**

**Second quarter**

- PHI – Brian Westbrook 6-yard pass from Donovan McNabb (David Akers kick), 5:46. Eagles 10–7. **Drive: 12 plays, 93 yards, 6:20.**
- PHI – Brian Westbrook 1-yard run (David Akers kick), 2:19. Eagles 17–7. **Drive: 4 plays, 49 yards, 1:46.**
- MIN – Ryan Longwell 39-yard field goal, 0:58. Eagles 17–10. **Drive: 8 plays, 52 yards, 1:21.**

**Third quarter**

- PHI – David Akers 27-yard field goal, 10:46. Eagles 20–10. **Drive: 6 plays, 51 yards, 2:36.**
- MIN – Ryan Longwell 32-yard field goal, 1:42. Eagles 20–13. **Drive: 11 plays, 55 yards, 5:41.**

**Fourth quarter**

- MIN – Ryan Longwell 48-yard field goal, 8:53. Eagles 20–16. **Drive: 9 plays, 40 yards, 4:22.**
- PHI – David Akers 25-yard field goal, 5:09. Eagles 23–16. **Drive: 9 plays, 66 yards, 3:44.**

**Top passers**

- PHI – Donovan McNabb – 23/36, 333 yards, TD
- MIN – Brooks Bollinger – 7/10, 94 yards

**Top rushers**

- PHI – Brian Westbrook – 21 rushes, 46 yards, TD
- MIN – Adrian Peterson – 20 rushes, 70 yards

**Top receivers**

- PHI – Reggie Brown – 8 receptions, 105 yards
- MIN – Bobby Wade – 4 receptions, 53 yards

Hoping to rebound from their road loss to the Cowboys, the Vikings came home for a Week 8 intraconference duel with the Philadelphia Eagles that saw head coach Brad Childress go up against his mentor, Philadelphia coach Andy Reid. With starting quarterback Tarvaris Jackson out with a thumb injury, veteran backup Kelly Holcomb got the start.

In the first quarter, Minnesota took an early lead as Holcomb completed a 9-yard touchdown pass to tight end Visanthe Shiancoe. The Eagles responded with a 20-yard David Akers field goal, before running back Brian Westbrook scored a 6-yard touchdown catch followed by a 1-yard run to put the Eagles up 17–7. Minnesota's only response for the period was a 39-yard field goal from kicker Ryan Longwell.

In the third quarter, Akers and Longwell traded field goals from 27 and 32 yards. Longwell then drew the Vikings to within four points on a 48-yard field goal with just under 9 minutes to play in the game, only for Akers to seal the win for the Eagles on a 25-yard field goal.

Holcomb (7/16 for 88 yards and 1 touchdown) was concussed on a sack in the third quarter, resulting in Brooks Bollinger (7/10 for 94 yards) coming in to finish the game.

==== Week 9: vs. San Diego Chargers ====
Week 9: San Diego Chargers at Minnesota Vikings – Game summary

Quarter	1	2	3	4	Total
Chargers	7	7	0	3	**17**
**Vikings**	7	0	14	14	**35**

at Hubert H. Humphrey Metrodome, Minneapolis

- Date: November 4
- Game time: 1:05 p.m. EST/12:05 p.m. CST
- Game weather: Indoors
- Game attendance: 63,043
- Referee: Mike Carey
- TV announcers (CBS): Greg Gumbel (play-by-play) and Dan Dierdorf (color commentator)
- Recap, Game Book

Game information

**First quarter**

- SD – LaDainian Tomlinson 1-yard run (Nate Kaeding kick), 5:44. Chargers 7–0. **Drive: 10 plays, 53 yards, 5:39.**
- MIN – Adrian Peterson 1-yard run (Ryan Longwell kick), 2:49. Tied 7–7. **Drive: 5 plays, 39 yards, 2:55.**

**Second quarter**

- SD – Antonio Cromartie 109-yard field goal return (Nate Kaeding kick), 0:00. Chargers 14–7.

**Third quarter**

- MIN – Adrian Peterson 64-yard run (Ryan Longwell kick), 12:44. Tied 14–14. **Drive: 6 plays, 83 yards, 2:16.**
- MIN – Sidney Rice 40-yard pass from Brooks Bollinger (Ryan Longwell kick), 3:07. Vikings 21–14. **Drive: 6 plays, 81 yards, 3:37.**

**Fourth quarter**

- SD – Nate Kaeding 36-yard field goal, 14:09. Vikings 21–17. **Drive: 10 plays, 63 yards, 3:58.**
- MIN – Adrian Peterson 46-yard run (Ryan Longwell kick), 7:44. Vikings 28–17. **Drive: 1 play, 46 yards, 0:10.**
- MIN – Chester Taylor 2-yard run (Ryan Longwell kick), 4:28. Vikings 35–17. **Drive: 5 plays, 40 yards, 3:02.**

**Top passers**

- SD – Philip Rivers – 19/42, 197 yards, INT
- MIN – Brooks Bollinger – 7/10, 95 yards, TD

**Top rushers**

- SD – LaDainian Tomlinson – 16 rushes, 40 yards, TD
- MIN – Adrian Peterson – 30 rushes, 296 yards, 3 TD

**Top receivers**

- SD – Chris Chambers – 5 receptions, 59 yards
- MIN – Sidney Rice – 4 receptions, 66 yards, TD

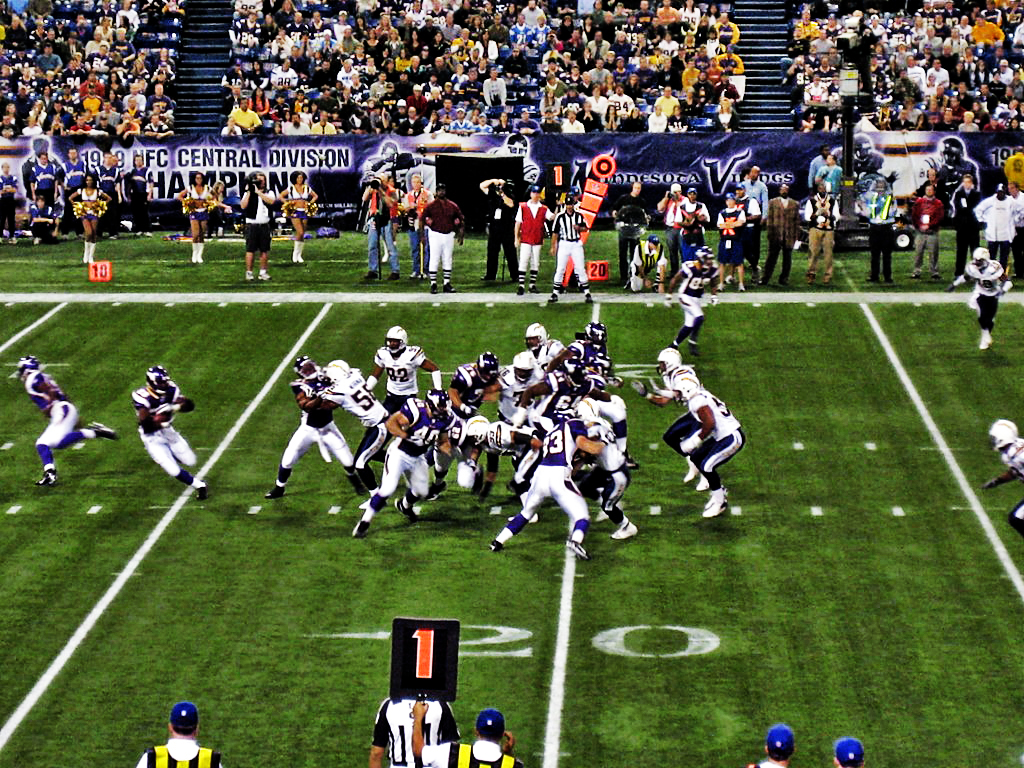
Adrian Peterson rushing against San Diego in week 9

Hoping to rebound from their home loss to the Eagles, the Vikings stayed at home and played a Week 9 interconference game against the San Diego Chargers. The two teams were level by the end of the first quarter, following 1-yard touchdown runs from both Chargers running back LaDainian Tomlinson and the Vikings' Adrian Peterson. The second quarter then went scoreless until the very last play of the half, when kicker Ryan Longwell came up short on a 57-yard field goal attempt, which Antonio Cromartie returned 109 yards for a touchdown, the longest possible play in the game.

The Vikings scored a pair of long touchdowns in the third quarter, as Peterson scored on a 64-yard run, followed by a 40-yard pass from Brooks Bollinger to Sidney Rice. The Chargers narrowed the Vikings' lead to four points in the fourth quarter on a 36-yard field goal by Nate Kaeding, but another long touchdown run of 46 yards from Peterson and a 2-yard score from fellow running back Chester Taylor sealed a 35–17 win for the Vikings.

Peterson had 30 carries for 296 rushing yards, setting a new league record for a single game, along with three touchdowns.

Quarterback Tarvaris Jackson (6/12 for 63 yards) started the game, but was concussed in the second quarter and replaced by Brooks Bollinger.

==== Week 10: at Green Bay Packers ====
Week 10: Minnesota Vikings at Green Bay Packers – Game summary

Quarter	1	2	3	4	Total
Vikings	0	0	0	0	**0**
**Packers**	7	6	14	7	**34**

at Lambeau Field, Green Bay, Wisconsin

- Date: November 11
- Game time: 1:00 p.m. EST/12:00 p.m. CST
- Game weather: Partly sunny, 49 °F (9 °C)
- Game attendance: 70,945
- Referee: Gerry Austin
- TV announcers (Fox): Dick Stockton (play-by-play) and Brian Baldinger (color commentator)
- Recap, Game Book

Game information

**First quarter**

- GB – Ryan Grant 30-yard run (Mason Crosby kick), 7:18. Packers 7–0. **Drive: 12 plays, 82 yards, 5:32.**

**Second quarter**

- GB – Mason Crosby 39-yard field goal, 6:30. Packers 10–0. **Drive: 13 plays, 69 yards, 8:13.**
- GB – Mason Crosby 24-yard field goal, 0:00. Packers 13–0. **Drive: 13 plays, 75 yards, 2:50.**

**Third quarter**

- GB – Donald Lee 1-yard pass from Brett Favre (Mason Crosby kick), 9:29. Packers 20–0. **Drive: 9 plays, 72 yards, 5:31.**
- GB – Ruvell Martin 8-yard pass from Brett Favre (Mason Crosby kick), 2:24. Packers 27–0. **Drive: 10 plays, 69 yards, 4:59.**

**Fourth quarter**

- GB – Ruvell Martin 17-yard pass from Brett Favre (Mason Crosby kick), 5:38. Packers 34–0. **Drive: 9 plays, 96 yards, 5:54.**

**Top passers**

- MIN – Brooks Bollinger – 16/26, 176 yards, INT
- GB – Brett Favre – 33/46, 351 yards, 3 TD

**Top rushers**

- MIN – Adrian Peterson – 11 rushes, 45 yards
- GB – Ryan Grant – 25 rushes, 119 yards, TD

**Top receivers**

- MIN – Robert Ferguson – 6 receptions, 59 yards
- GB – Donald Driver – 4 receptions, 63 yards
- GB – Greg Jennings – 4 receptions, 63 yards

Playing their first road game in three weeks, the Vikings traveled to Lambeau Field to play their long-time rivals, the Green Bay Packers.

In the first half, a 30-yard run by Ryan Grant gave the Packers a 7–0 lead, and two field goals by Mason Crosby (a 39-yard field goal midway through the 2nd quarter and a 24-yard field goal at the end of the half) provided all the first half scoring, as the Vikings went to the locker room trailing 13–0.

The Packers completed the shutout with Brett Favre throwing a pair of third-quarter touchdown passes, one to Donald Lee and one to Ruvell Martin. Martin scored again in the fourth quarter. The Vikings were shut out 34–0, the first time the Vikings had been shut out in the regular season since 1991.

Adrian Peterson suffered a knee injury in the third quarter and left the game.

With the loss, Minnesota fell to 3–6 and were swept by the Packers.

==== Week 11: vs. Oakland Raiders ====
Week 11: Oakland Raiders at Minnesota Vikings – Game summary

Quarter	1	2	3	4	Total
Raiders	3	16	0	3	**22**
**Vikings**	9	10	3	7	**29**

at Hubert H. Humphrey Metrodome, Minneapolis

- Date: November 18
- Game time: 1:00 p.m. EST/12:00 p.m. CST
- Game weather: Indoors
- Game attendance: 62,960
- Referee: Jeff Triplette
- TV announcers (CBS): Dick Enberg (play-by-play) and Randy Cross (color commentator)
- Recap, Game Book

Game information

**First quarter**

- MIN – Chester Taylor 10-yard run (Ryan Longwell kick), 14:11. Vikings 7–0. **Drive: 2 plays, 84 yards, 0:49.**
- MIN – Penalty on Daunte Culpepper enforced in the end zone for a safety, 8:30. Vikings 9–0.
- OAK – Sebastian Janikowski 42-yard field goal, 4:45. Vikings 9–3. **Drive: 6 plays, 29 yards, 2:46.**

**Second quarter**

- MIN – Ryan Longwell 30-yard field goal, 14:56. Vikings 12–3. **Drive: 9 plays, 61 yards, 4:49.**
- OAK – John Madsen 10-yard pass from Daunte Culpepper (Sebastian Janikowski kick), 12:57. Vikings 12–10. **Drive: 5 plays, 67 yards, 1:59.**
- OAK – Sebastian Janikowski 30-yard field goal, 11:18. Raiders 13–12. **Drive: 4 plays, 2 yards, 1:26.**
- MIN – Chester Taylor 38-yard run (Ryan Longwell kick), 9:17. Vikings 19–13. **Drive: 4 plays, 64 yards, 2:01.**
- OAK – Sebastian Janikowski 42-yard field goal, 1:42. Vikings 19–16. **Drive: 9 plays, 44 yards, 2:53.**
- OAK – Sebastian Janikowski 49-yard field goal, 0:00. Tied 19–19. **Drive: 5 plays, 15 yards, 0:46.**

**Third quarter**

- MIN – Ryan Longwell 38-yard field goal, 8:23. Vikings 22–19. **Drive: 6 plays, 48 yards, 2:34.**

**Fourth quarter**

- MIN – Chester Taylor 6-yard run (Ryan Longwell kick), 14:52. Vikings 29–19. **Drive: 6 plays, 74 yards, 2:52.**
- OAK – Sebastian Janikowski 52-yard field goal, 3:23. Vikings 29–22. **Drive: 7 plays, 58 yards, 1:59.**

**Top passers**

- OAK – Daunte Culpepper – 23/39, 344 yards, TD, INT
- MIN – Tarvaris Jackson – 17/22, 171 yards, INT

**Top rushers**

- OAK – Justin Fargas – 22 rushes, 60 yards
- MIN – Chester Taylor – 22 rushes, 164 yards, 3 TD

**Top receivers**

- OAK – Ronald Curry – 4 receptions, 120 yards
- MIN – Visanthe Shiancoe – 2 receptions, 94 yards

Hoping to rebound from their divisional road loss to the Packers, the Vikings' Week 11 opponent was the Oakland Raiders, who had former Vikings quarterback Daunte Culpepper under center. After a 79-yard pass from wide receiver Sidney Rice to Visanthe Shiancoe on the first play from scrimmage, the Vikings scored on the very next play on a 10-yard run from Chester Taylor. This was followed by a safety when Culpepper was penalized for intentional grounding in his own endzone. Two plays after the ensuing free kick, the Vikings fumbled the ball just inside Oakland territory, allowing the Raiders to set up a 42-yard field goal for Sebastian Janikowski. On the next drive, the Vikings restored their nine-point lead as kicker Ryan Longwell hit a 30-yard field goal on the first play of the second quarter. A short Oakland drive culminating in 10-yard touchdown pass from Culpepper to tight end John Madsen, followed by another Janikowski field goal, saw the Raiders take the lead for the first time. Four plays later, Minnesota regained a six-point lead on a 38-yard touchdown run from Taylor, but field goals of 42 and 49 yards from Janikowski meant the first half ended with the scores level at 19–19.

The Vikings recorded the only score of the third quarter on a 38-yard field goal from Longwell, though they did finish the period on the Raiders' 6-yard line, allowing Taylor to run in his third touchdown on the opening play of the fourth quarter, the first time in his career that he scored three touchdowns in one game. A 52-yard field goal from Janikowski narrowed the margin to 7 points with less than three-and-a-half minutes to play, and after forcing the Vikings to punt just inside the two-minute warning, they had one last chance to level the scores. On the first play of the drive, Culpepper threw the ball in the direction of Justin Fargas, who tipped it up, allowing Chad Greenway to come up with an interception; he went to ground with the ball, but inexplicably got up and attempted to advance it, which allowed left tackle Barry Sims to force a fumble, recovered by right guard Paul McQuistan. That enabled the Raiders to extend their drive, but although they managed to get into Vikings territory, a false start penalty meant Culpepper had to attempt a Hail Mary pass on the final play, but it came up short, giving the Vikings a 29–22 win.

==== Week 12: at New York Giants ====
Week 12: Minnesota Vikings at New York Giants – Game summary

Quarter	1	2	3	4	Total
**Vikings**	14	10	3	14	**41**
Giants	7	0	3	7	**17**

at Giants Stadium, East Rutherford, New Jersey

- Date: November 25
- Game time: 1:00 p.m. EST/12:00 p.m. CST
- Game weather: Sunny, 46 °F (8 °C)
- Game attendance: 78,591
- Referee: Walt Anderson
- TV announcers (Fox): Kenny Albert (play-by-play), Daryl Johnston (color commentator) and Tony Siragusa (sideline reporter)
- Recap, Game Book

Game information

**First quarter**

- MIN – Sidney Rice 60-yard pass from Tarvaris Jackson (Ryan Longwell kick), 14:19. Vikings 7–0. **Drive: 2 plays, 60 yards, 0:41.**
- NYG – Reuben Droughns 1-yard run (Lawrence Tynes kick), 9:25. Tied 7–7. **Drive: 8 plays, 65 yards, 4:54.**
- MIN – Darren Sharper 20-yard interception return (Ryan Longwell kick), 3:15. Vikings 14–7.

**Second quarter**

- MIN – Chester Taylor 8-yard run (Ryan Longwell kick), 9:49. Vikings 21–7. **Drive: 1 play, 8 yards, 0:09.**
- MIN – Ryan Longwell 46-yard field goal, 3:16. Vikings 24–7. **Drive: 9 plays, 37 yards, 4:47.**

**Third quarter**

- NYG – Lawrence Tynes 48-yard field goal, 11:07. Vikings 24–10. **Drive: 10 plays, 48 yards, 3:53.**
- MIN – Ryan Longwell 26-yard field goal, 1:43. Vikings 27–10. **Drive: 14 plays, 69 yards, 9:24.**

**Fourth quarter**

- MIN – Dwight Smith 93-yard interception return (Ryan Longwell kick), 13:41. Vikings 34–10.
- MIN – Chad Greenway 37-yard interception return (Ryan Longwell kick), 12:59. Vikings 41–10.
- NYG – Plaxico Burress 6-yard pass from Eli Manning (Lawrence Tynes kick), 5:54. Vikings 41–17. **Drive: 7 plays, 44 yards, 2:51.**

**Top passers**

- MIN – Tarvaris Jackson – 10/12, 129 yards, TD
- NYG – Eli Manning – 21/49, 273 yards, TD, 4 INT

**Top rushers**

- MIN – Chester Taylor – 31 rushes, 77 yards, TD
- NYG – Reuben Droughns – 15 rushes, 46 yards, TD

**Top receivers**

- MIN – Sidney Rice – 3 receptions, 82 yards, TD
- NYG – Plaxico Burress – 7 receptions, 93 yards, TD

Coming off their home win over the Raiders, the Vikings flew to the Meadowlands for a Week 12 matchup with the New York Giants. In the first quarter, the Vikings scored first as QB Tarvaris Jackson completed a 60-yard TD pass to WR Sidney Rice. The Giants responded with RB Reuben Droughns getting a 1-yard TD run. Minnesota regained the lead with safety Darren Sharper returning an interception 20 yards for a touchdown. In the second quarter, the Vikings continued their scoring as RB Chester Taylor got an 8-yard TD run, while kicker Ryan Longwell managed to get a 46-yard field goal.

In the third quarter, New York tried to come back as kicker Lawrence Tynes hit a 26-yard field goal. Minnesota answered with Longwell kicking a 26-yard field goal. In the fourth quarter, the Vikings pulled away with safety Dwight Smith returning an interception 93 yards for a touchdown, along with LB Chad Greenway returning an interception 37 yards for a touchdown. The Giants' only response was QB Eli Manning's 6-yard TD pass to WR Plaxico Burress.

With the win, the Vikings improved to 5–6.

Minnesota's league-worst pass defense had a big game as they intercepted Eli Manning four times (one from Sharper, two from Smith and one from Greenway), with three of them getting returned for touchdowns (which is the most since the 1984 Seahawks returned 4 picks in one game). It set a franchise record for the most interception return yards in one game with 169.

==== Week 13: vs. Detroit Lions ====
Week 13: Detroit Lions at Minnesota Vikings – Game summary

Quarter	1	2	3	4	Total
Lions	3	7	0	0	**10**
**Vikings**	7	28	7	0	**42**

at Hubert H. Humphrey Metrodome, Minneapolis

- Date: December 2
- Game time: 1:00 p.m. EST/12:00 p.m. CST
- Game weather: Indoors
- Game attendance: 62,996
- Referee: Larry Nemmers
- TV announcers (Fox): Dick Stockton (play-by-play) and Brian Baldinger (color commentator)
- Recap, Game Book

Game information

**First quarter**

- MIN – Chester Taylor 2-yard run (Ryan Longwell kick), 7:24. Vikings 7–0. **Drive: 9 plays, 87 yards, 5:17.**
- DET – Jason Hanson 37-yard field goal, 1:57. Vikings 7–3. **Drive: 11 plays, 42 yards, 5:27.**

**Second quarter**

- MIN – Adrian Peterson 16-yard run (Ryan Longwell kick), 11:23. Vikings 14–3. **Drive: 10 plays, 84 yards, 5:34.**
- DET – Casey FitzSimmons 1-yard pass from Jon Kitna (Jason Hanson kick), 9:37. Vikings 14–10. **Drive: 4 plays, 73 yards, 1:46.**
- MIN – Aundrae Allison 104-yard kickoff return (Ryan Longwell kick), 9:23. Vikings 21–10. **Drive: 0 plays, 0 yards, 0:14.**
- MIN – Bobby Wade 6-yard pass from Tarvaris Jackson (Ryan Longwell kick), 2:17. Vikings 28–10. **Drive: 10 plays, 51 yards, 5:31.**
- MIN – Sidney Rice 2-yard pass from Tarvaris Jackson (Ryan Longwell kick), 0:05. Vikings 35–10. **Drive: 5 plays, 27 yards, 0:48.**

**Third quarter**

- MIN – Adrian Peterson 13-yard run (Ryan Longwell kick), 10:06. Vikings 42–10. **Drive: 9 plays, 66 yards, 4:54.**

**Fourth quarter**

- No scoring plays.

**Top passers**

- DET – Jon Kitna – 27/35, 260 yards, TD
- MIN – Tarvaris Jackson – 18/24, 204 yards, 2 TD, INT

**Top rushers**

- DET – T. J. Duckett – 3 rushes, 22 yards
- MIN – Adrian Peterson – 15 rushes, 116 yards, 2 TD

**Top receivers**

- DET – Roy Williams – 5 receptions, 85 yards
- MIN – Bobby Wade – 4 receptions, 54 yards, TD

Coming off their road win over the Giants, the Vikings went home for a Week 13 divisional rematch with the Detroit Lions. In the first quarter, Minnesota scored first as RB Chester Taylor completed a 2-yard TD run. The Lions replied with kicker Jason Hanson hitting a 37-yard field goal. In the second quarter, Minnesota answered with rookie RB Adrian Peterson getting a 16-yard TD run. Detroit responded with QB Jon Kitna completing a 1-yard TD pass to TE/FB Casey Fitzsimmons. Afterwards, the Vikings immediately scored with rookie WR Aundrae Allison returning a kickoff 103 yards for a touchdown (a franchise best), while QB Tarvaris Jackson completing a 6-yard TD pass to WR Bobby Wade and a 2-yard TD pass to WR Sidney Rice. In the third quarter, Peterson added a 13-yard TD run.

With the win, the Vikings improved to 6–6.

This was the first time since their 15–1 season of 1998 that they were able to get 40+ points in back-to-back games.

==== Week 14: at San Francisco 49ers ====
Week 14: Minnesota Vikings at San Francisco 49ers – Game summary

Quarter	1	2	3	4	Total
**Vikings**	10	17	0	0	**27**
49ers	0	0	7	0	**7**

at Bill Walsh Field at Monster Park, San Francisco

- Date: December 9
- Game time: 4:05 p.m. EST/3:05 p.m. CST
- Game weather: Sunny and clear, 53 °F (12 °C)
- Game attendance: 68,050
- Referee: Peter Morelli
- TV announcers (Fox): Matt Vasgersian (play-by-play) and J.C. Pearson (color commentator)
- Recap, Game Book

Game information

**First quarter**

- MIN – Kevin Williams 18-yard interception return (Ryan Longwell kick), 14:46. Vikings 7–0.
- MIN – Ryan Longwell 48-yard field goal, 5:08. Vikings 10–0. **Drive: 13 plays, 55 yards, 6:15.**

**Second quarter**

- MIN – Robert Ferguson 19-yard pass from Tarvaris Jackson (Ryan Longwell kick), 14:14. Vikings 17–0. **Drive: 7 plays, 58 yards, 2:44.**
- MIN – Ryan Longwell 46-yard field goal, 7:16. Vikings 20–0. **Drive: 4 plays, −5 yards, 1:31.**
- MIN – Chester Taylor 84-yard run (Ryan Longwell kick), 5:52. Vikings 27–0. **Drive: 2 plays, 81 yards, 0:53.**

**Third quarter**

- SF – Arnaz Battle 5-yard pass from Shaun Hill (Joe Nedney kick), 7:06. Vikings 27–7. **Drive: 12 plays, 61 yards, 6:31.**

**Fourth quarter**

- No scoring plays.

**Top passers**

- MIN – Tarvaris Jackson – 16/25, 163 yards, TD
- SF – Shaun Hill – 22/27, 181 yards, TD

**Top rushers**

- MIN – Chester Taylor – 8 rushes, 101 yards, TD
- SF – Frank Gore – 16 rushes, 68 yards

**Top receivers**

- MIN – Robert Ferguson – 4 receptions, 57 yards, TD
- SF – Delanie Walker – 6 receptions, 66 yards

After their home win over the Lions, the Vikings flew to Bill Walsh Field at Monster Park for a Week 14 contest with the San Francisco 49ers. In the first quarter, Minnesota scored first as DT Kevin Williams returned an interception 18 yards for a touchdown, along with kicker Ryan Longwell getting a 48-yard field goal. In the second quarter, the Vikings added to their lead as QB Tarvaris Jackson completed a 19-yard TD pass to WR Robert Ferguson. Longwell hit a 46-yard field goal, and RB Chester Taylor completed an 84-yard TD run. In the third quarter, the 49ers got their only score of the game as QB Shaun Hill completed a 5-yard TD pass to WR Arnaz Battle.

With the win, Minnesota improved to 7–6.

Rookie RB Adrian Peterson ended the day with a career-low 3 yards rushing on 14 carries.

==== Week 15: vs. Chicago Bears ====
Week 15: Chicago Bears at Minnesota Vikings – Game summary

Quarter	1	2	3	4	Total
Bears	3	10	0	0	**13**
**Vikings**	0	6	6	8	**20**

at Hubert H. Humphrey Metrodome, Minneapolis

- Date: December 17
- Game time: 8:30 p.m. EST/7:30 p.m. CST
- Game weather: Indoors
- Game attendance: 63,800
- Referee: Tony Corrente
- TV announcers (ESPN): Mike Tirico (play-by-play), Ron Jaworski, Tony Kornheiser (color commentators), Michele Tafoya and Suzy Kolber (sideline reporters)
- Recap, Game Book

Game information

**First quarter**

- CHI – Robbie Gould 29-yard field goal, 10:41. Bears 3–0. **Drive: 4 plays, 3 yards, 1:29.**

**Second quarter**

- MIN – Ryan Longwell 42-yard field goal, 10:07. Tied 3–3. **Drive: 6 plays, 38 yards, 2:20.**
- CHI – Robbie Gould 47-yard field goal, 6:57. Bears 6–3. **Drive: 8 plays, 14 yards, 3:10.**
- CHI – Jason McKie 1-yard run (Robbie Gould kick), 0:30. Bears 13–3. **Drive: 2 plays, 12 yards, 0:13.**
- MIN – Ryan Longwell 48-yard field goal, 0:00. Bears 13–6. **Drive: 4 plays, 43 yards, 0:30.**

**Third quarter**

- MIN – Adrian Peterson 1-yard run (kick failed, wl), 10:29. Vikings 13–12. **Drive: 4 plays, 73 yards, 2:08.**

**Fourth quarter**

- MIN – Adrian Peterson 8-yard run (Brooks Bollinger run), 10:56. Vikings 13–20. **Drive: 11 plays, 65 yards, 6:18.**

**Top passers**

- CHI – Kyle Orton – 22/38, 184 yards, INT
- MIN – Tarvaris Jackson – 18/29, 249 yards, 3 INT

**Top rushers**

- CHI – Adrian Peterson – 9 rushes, 26 yards
- MIN – Adrian Peterson – 20 rushes, 78 yards, 2 TD

**Top receivers**

- CHI – Adrian Peterson – 8 receptions, 51 yards
- MIN – Robert Ferguson – 2 receptions, 79 yards

After the west coast win over the 49ers, the Vikings went home for a Week 15 Monday night NFC North rematch with the Chicago Bears. Chicago's kicker Robbie Gould kicked a 29-yard field goal for the only score of the first quarter. In the second quarter, Minnesota responded with kicker Ryan Longwell getting a 42-yard field goal. Chicago took the halftime lead with Gould kicking a 47-yard field goal and FB Jason McKie getting a 1-yard TD run.

In the third quarter, the Vikings started to rally as rookie RB Adrian Peterson got a 1-yard TD run (with a failed PAT) for the only score of the period. In the fourth quarter, the Vikings took the lead as Peterson got an 8-yard TD run. The Bears were unable to score in the second half.

With the win, the Vikings improved to 8–6.

==== Week 16: vs. Washington Redskins ====
Week 16: Washington Redskins at Minnesota Vikings – Game summary

Quarter	1	2	3	4	Total
**Redskins**	9	13	3	7	**32**
Vikings	0	0	7	14	**21**

at Hubert H. Humphrey Metrodome, Minneapolis

- Date: December 23
- Game time: 8:15 p.m. EST/7:15 p.m. CST
- Game weather: Indoors
- Game attendance: 63,634
- Referee: Bill Leavy
- TV announcers (NBC): Al Michaels (play-by-play), John Madden(color commentator) and Andrea Kremer (sideline reporter)
- Recap, Game Book

Game information

**First quarter**

- WAS – Tony Richardson tackled in end zone by Kedric Golston for a safety, 10:43. Redskins 2–0.
- WAS – Chris Cooley 33-yard pass from Todd Collins (Shaun Suisham kick), 7:24. Redskins 9–0. **Drive: 7 plays, 67 yards, 3:19.**

**Second quarter**

- WAS – Santana Moss 32-yard pass from Todd Collins (Shaun Suisham kick), 7:43. Redskins 16–0. **Drive: 2 plays, 32 yards, 0:11.**
- WAS – Antwaan Randle El 15-yard pass from Clinton Portis (pass failed), 0:44. Redskins 22–0. **Drive: 10 plays, 80 yards, 3:30.**

**Third quarter**

- WAS – Shaun Suisham 26-yard field goal, 6:52. Redskins 25–0. **Drive: 10 plays, 56 yards, 4:53.**
- MIN – Jim Kleinsasser 2-yard pass from Tarvaris Jackson (Ryan Longwell kick), 2:54. Redskins 25–7. **Drive: 7 plays, 77 yards, 3:58.**

**Fourth quarter**

- MIN – Tarvaris Jackson 6-yard run (Ryan Longwell kick), 10:18. Redskins 25–14. **Drive: 9 plays, 51 yards, 4:31.**
- WAS – Clinton Portis 13-yard run (Shaun Suisham kick), 5:06. Redskins 32–14. **Drive: 9 plays, 75 yards, 5:12.**
- MIN – Tarvaris Jackson 1-yard run (Ryan Longwell kick), 1:58. Redskins 32–21. **Drive: 13 plays, 72 yards, 3:08.**

**Top passers**

- WAS – Todd Collins – 22/29, 254 yards, 2 TD
- MIN – Tarvaris Jackson – 25/41, 220 yards, TD, 2 INT

**Top rushers**

- WAS – Clinton Portis – 20 rushes, 76 yards, TD
- MIN – Tarvaris Jackson – 8 rushes, 44 yards, 2 TD

**Top receivers**

- WAS – Santana Moss – 4 receptions, 71 yards, TD
- MIN – Robert Ferguson – 4 receptions, 51 yards

After the Monday night win over the Bears, the Vikings hosted the Washington Redskins. With a win, the Vikings clinched an NFC playoff berth. The Redskins also needed a win to avoid elimination. Washington scored the only points in the first half, leading 22–0 at halftime on a safety and three touchdowns. Passes by Todd Collins to Chris Cooley and Santana Moss as well as a pass from Clinton Portis to Antwaan Randle El completed the scoring. After a field goal by Washington's Shaun Suisham to start the second half at 25–0, Minnesota answered with two touchdowns by Tarvaris Jackson: one a short pass to Jim Kleinsasser, the other a 6-yard rush. Each team scored an additional touchdown in the fourth quarter, bringing the final score to 32–21.

With the loss, the Vikings fell to 8–7, matching the Redskins' record. In order to secure a playoff spot, the Vikings needed a win in Denver in week 17, as well as a loss by the Redskins against the Dallas Cowboys. Because of this loss in week 16, if the Redskins won their last game, the Vikings would be eliminated from the playoffs regardless of the outcome of the Denver game.

==== Week 17: at Denver Broncos ====
Week 17: Minnesota Vikings at Denver Broncos – Game summary

Quarter	1	2	3	4	OT	Total
Vikings	0	3	0	16	0	**19**
**Broncos**	0	14	3	2	3	**22**

at Invesco Field at Mile High, Denver, Colorado

- Date: December 30
- Game time: 4:15 p.m. EST/3:15 p.m. CST
- Game weather: Partly cloudy, 36 °F (2 °C)
- Game attendance: 76,084
- Referee: Jerome Boger
- TV announcers (Fox): Sam Rosen (play by play), Tim Ryan (color commentator)
- Recap, Game Book

Game information

**First quarter**

- No scoring plays.

**Second quarter**

- MIN – Ryan Longwell 22-yard field goal, 14:51. Vikings 3–0. **Drive: 13–56, 6:05.**
- DEN – Brandon Marshall 15-yard pass from Jay Cutler (Jason Elam kick), 11:25. Broncos 7–3. **Drive: 6 plays, 74 yards, 3:26.**
- DEN – Tony Scheffler 2-yard pass from Jay Cutler (Jason Elam kick), 1:54. Broncos 14–3. **Drive: 7 plays, 48 yards, 4:09.**

**Third quarter**

- DEN – Jason Elam 43-yard field goal, 7:35. Broncos 17–3. **Drive: 13 plays, 52 yards, 6:23.**

**Fourth quarter**

- DEN – Vikings penalty in own end zone, resulting in safety, 13:04. Broncos 19–3.
- MIN – Bobby Wade 5-yard pass from Tarvaris Jackson (Tarvaris Jackson run), 5:18. Broncos 19–11. **Drive: 8 plays, 69 yards, 2:46.**
- MIN – Bobby Wade 22-yard pass from Tarvaris Jackson (Tarvaris Jackson run), 2:21. Tied 19–19. **Drive: 5 plays, 65 yards, 1:51.**

**Overtime**

- DEN – Jason Elam 30-yard field goal, 14:08. Broncos 22–19. **Drive: 1 play, 0 yards, 0:04.**

**Top passers**

- MIN – Tarvaris Jackson – 16/31, 175 yards, 2 TD
- DEN – Jay Cutler – 26/37, 246 yards, 2 TD

**Top rushers**

- MIN – Chester Taylor – 10 rushes, 83 yards
- DEN – Selvin Young – 22 rushes, 87 yards

**Top receivers**

- MIN – Bobby Wade – 5 receptions, 92 yards, 2 TD
- DEN – Brandon Marshall – 10 receptions, 114 yards, TD

In the final game of the season, the Vikings lost in overtime to the Broncos. Trailing in the fourth quarter by 16, Minnesota was able to score two touchdowns (both passes from Tarvaris Jackson to Bobby Wade), and complete two two-point conversions, (both quarterback runs by Jackson) to tie the game at 19. In overtime, the Vikings had the ball first, but on the second play of their drive, Jackson was hit by Alvin McKinley and fumbled. The ball was recovered by Elvis Dumervil on Minnesota's 13 yd line. Jason Elam kicked a 30-yard game-winning field goal.

The Vikings finished with an 8–8 record and were eliminated from playoff contention due to the Redskins' victory over the Dallas Cowboys 27–6.

=== Standings ===
NFC North
	W	L	T	PCT	DIV	CONF	PF	PA	STK
^{(2)} Green Bay Packers	13	3	0	.813	4–2	9–3	435	291	W1
Minnesota Vikings	8	8	0	.500	3–3	6–6	365	311	L2
Detroit Lions	7	9	0	.438	3–3	4–8	346	444	L1
Chicago Bears	7	9	0	.438	2–4	4–8	334	348	W2

== Statistics ==
=== Team leaders ===
Category	Player(s)	Value
Passing yards	Tarvaris Jackson	1,911
Passing touchdowns	Tarvaris Jackson	9
Rushing yards	Adrian Peterson	1,341
Rushing touchdowns	Adrian Peterson	12
Receiving yards	Bobby Wade	647
Receiving touchdowns	Sidney Rice	4
Points	Ryan Longwell	99
Kickoff return yards	Aundrae Allison	574
Punt return yards	Mewelde Moore	130
Tackles	E. J. Henderson	118
Sacks	Ben Leber; Kenechi Udeze; Ray Edwards	5.0
Interceptions	Darren Sharper; Dwight Smith	4
Forced fumbles	Ray Edwards	4

=== League rankings ===
Category	Total yards	Yards per game	NFL rank (out of 32)
Passing offense	2,745	171.6	28th
Rushing offense	2,634	164.6	1st
Total offense	5,379	336.2	13th
Passing defense	4,225	264.1	32nd
Rushing defense	1,185	74.1	1st
Total defense	5,410	338.1	20th

== Pro Bowl ==
The Vikings had seven players selected to the 2008 Pro Bowl. Starting on offense were RB Adrian Peterson, fullback Tony Richardson and offensive guard Steve Hutchinson. Starting at defense were defensive tackles Kevin Williams and Pat Williams as well as strong safety Darren Sharper. The reserve center was Matt Birk. Only one team, the Dallas Cowboys, had more starters (7). Besides the seven named players for Minnesota, kicker Ryan Longwell was named a first alternate, and special teams player Heath Farwell and left tackle Bryant McKinnie were named second alternates.
