= Ray Edwards (American football) =

American football player (born 1985)

No. 91, 93
- Position: Defensive end

Personal information
- Born: January 1, 1985 (age 41); Cincinnati, Ohio, U.S.
- Listed height: 6 ft 5 in (1.96 m)
- Listed weight: 268 lb (122 kg)

Career information
- High school: Woodward (Cincinnati)
- College: Purdue (2003–2005)
- NFL draft: 2006: 4th round, 127th overall pick

Career history
- Minnesota Vikings (2006–2010); Atlanta Falcons (2011–2012)

Awards and highlights
- Sporting News All-Freshman team (2003)

Career NFL statistics
- Total tackles: 223
- Sacks: 33
- Forced fumbles: 4
- Fumble recoveries: 6
- Pass deflections: 15
- Defensive touchdowns: 1
- Stats at Pro Football Reference

Ray Edwards
Personal information
- Nickname: Monk
- Nationality: (United States) American
- Born: Raymond James Edwards Jr.

Boxing career
- Weight class: Heavyweight

Boxing record
- Total fights: 14
- Wins: 12
- Win by KO: 7
- Losses: 1
- Draws: 1

Raymond James Edwards Jr. (born January 1, 1985) is an American former professional football player who was a defensive end in the National Football League (NFL). He played college football for the Purdue Boilermakers and was selected by the Minnesota Vikings in the fourth round of the 2006 NFL draft.

== Early life ==
Edwards attended Woodward High School in Cincinnati and was a student and a letterman in football and basketball. In football, he was a two-year starter and posted 20.0 sacks, 110 tackles, and seven forced fumbles as a senior.

== College career ==
Edwards played college football for three years at Big Ten school Purdue University from 2003 to 2005. In his college career, Edwards played 36 games (starting in 18). He recorded a total of 16 sacks and received many honors including All-Freshmen team choice by The Sporting News (2003), honorable mention All-Big Ten (2004) and semifinalist for the Ted Hendricks Defensive End of the Year Award (2005).

== Professional career ==
Pre-draft measurables
Height	Weight	Arm length	Hand span	40-yard dash	10-yard split	20-yard split	20-yard shuttle	Three-cone drill	Vertical jump	Broad jump	Bench press
6 ft 4 3/4 in (1.95 m)	273 lb (124 kg)	33 1/4 in (0.84 m)	10 3/8 in (0.26 m)	4.83 s	1.61 s	2.77 s	4.57 s	7.71 s	39 in (0.99 m)	9 ft 6 in (2.90 m)	30 reps
All values from NFL Combine

=== Minnesota Vikings ===
Edwards was selected as the 127th pick (fourth round) of the 2006 NFL draft. During his rookie season, he appeared in 15 of the 16 regular season games, (the most for a Vikings rookie that year) and started in 2 of the last 4 games. He recorded 3 sacks and 10 tackles. In 2007 Edwards had 5 sacks and 30 tackles in 12 games. He scored one touchdown on a fumble recovery against Detroit. On December 5, Edwards was suspended for four games by the National Football League for a violation of the league's Steroid policy. He was not eligible to play for the remainder of the Vikings regular season. In 2008 Edwards made 55 tackles and 5 sacks as the starting left defensive end after the acquisition of Jared Allen. In 2009, Edwards had a breakout year, recording 8.5 sacks, and having a strong performance against the Dallas Cowboys in the Divisional Round of the post-season. Edwards became a restricted free agent in the 2010 offseason due to the CBA dispute instead of an unrestricted FA as he would have been if there were a labor agreement. The Vikings gave him a first-round restricted free agent tender. He signed the tender on June 14, 2010, after deciding to miss the Vikings offseason program.

=== Atlanta Falcons ===
On July 29, 2011, Edwards was signed by the Atlanta Falcons to a five-year contract for 30 million dollars with 11 million dollars guaranteed. During the Falcons' 8–1 start in 2012, Edwards was largely invisible, with most of his snaps being taken by players with much lower salaries.

Edwards was released by the Falcons on November 12, 2012.

== NFL career statistics ==
Legend
**Bold**	Career high

=== Regular season ===
Year	Team	Games		Tackles					Interceptions					Fumbles			
Year	Team	GP	GS	Cmb	Solo	Ast	Sck	TFL	Int	Yds	TD	Lng	PD	FF	FR	Yds	TD
2006	MIN	15	2	10	7	3	3.0	2	0	0	0	0	2	0	0	0	0
2007	MIN	12	11	30	26	4	5.0	7	0	0	0	0	2	**2**	1	9	**1**
2008	MIN	15	15	**53**	34	**19**	5.0	12	0	0	0	0	**3**	1	0	0	0
2009	MIN	**16**	**16**	51	**43**	8	**8.5**	**15**	0	0	0	0	2	1	1	0	0
2010	MIN	14	14	37	28	9	8.0	9	0	0	0	0	**3**	0	0	0	0
2011	ATL	**16**	**16**	33	24	9	3.5	6	0	0	0	0	**3**	0	**2**	**64**	0
2012	ATL	9	4	9	6	3	0.0	2	0	0	0	0	0	0	**2**	26	0
		97	78	223	168	55	33.0	53	0	0	0	0	15	4	6	99	1

=== Playoffs ===
Year	Team	Games		Tackles					Interceptions					Fumbles			
Year	Team	GP	GS	Cmb	Solo	Ast	Sck	TFL	Int	Yds	TD	Lng	PD	FF	FR	Yds	TD
2009	MIN	**2**	**2**	**10**	**10**	0	**4.0**	**4**	0	0	0	0	0	**2**	0	0	0
2011	ATL	1	1	2	2	0	0.0	1	0	0	0	0	0	0	0	0	0
		3	3	12	12	0	4.0	5	0	0	0	0	0	2	0	0	0

== Catfish ==
In a 2020 episode of Catfish: The TV Show, hosts Nev Schulman and Kamie Crawford discover that the catfish they are tracking down in the episode used Edwards's photos in his fake Instagram account, along with two other men's photos.

== Boxing ==
Edwards made his professional boxing debut at a Minnesota casino on May 20, 2011, defeating Tyrone Gibson in a four-round bout. Edwards told the Star Tribune that he had signed a two-fight contract. His trainer was Jeff Warner, a former heavyweight boxer and pro wrestler.

== Professional boxing record ==
12 Wins (7 knockouts, 5 decisions), 1 Losses, 1 Draws
Res.	Record	Opponent	Type	Rd., Time	Date	Location	Notes
Loss	12-1-1	(United States) Keenan "Good Burger" Hickman	KO	4 (6) 2:55	2016-11-26	(United States) Firebird Athletic Complex, Bedford, Ohio	
Win	12-0-1	(United States) Daniel Pasciolla	UD	6	2016-09-15	(United States) 2300 Arena, Philadelphia, Pennsylvania	
Win	11-0-1	(United States) Steven Tyner	KO	2 (4) 2:14	2016-08-26	(United States) The Cabooze, Minneapolis, Minnesota	
Draw	10-0-1	(United States) Grover Young	SD	4	2015-11-25	(United States) Bayfront Convention Center, Erie, Pennsylvania	
Win	10-0-0	(United States) Efren "Doc" Brown	TKO	2 (4) 1:29	2015-06-27	(United States) Tyndall Armory, Indianapolis, Indiana	
Win	9–0	(United States) Brandon "Sizzler" Spencer	UD	6	2014-09-27	(United States) Performance Arts Center, Dearborn, Michigan	
Win	8–0	(United States) D. J. "Don't get me confused with DL" Hughley	TKO	4 (4), 0:47	2014-08-16	(United States) Carole Heafner Center, Charlotte, North Carolina	
Win	7–0	(United States) Sam "I Am" Coming	KO	2 (4), 0:53	2014-05-16	(United States) Henry Ford College, Dearborn, Michigan	
Win	6–0	(United States) Raymuendo Lopez	UD	4	2014-04-19	(United States) Henry Ford College, Dearborn, Michigan	
Win	5–0	(United States) Alex Rozman	UD	4	2014-01-24	(United States) Grand Casino, Hinckley, Minnesota	
Win	4–0	(United States) "Mini" Van Goodman	TKO	3 (4), 0:30	2013-03-15	(United States) Grand Casino, Hinckley, Minnesota	
Win	3–0	(United States) Nick "Turbo Tax" Capes	KO	1 (4), 0:29	2013-02-09	(United States) Red River Valley Fairgrounds, West Fargo, North Dakota	
Win	2–0	(United States) Cory "Spare Tire" Briggs	KO	1 (4), 0:41	2013-01-15	(United States) Grand Casino, Hinckley, Minnesota	
Win	1–0	(United States) Tyrone Gibson	UD	4	2011-05-20	(United States) Grand Casino, Hinckley, Minnesota	Professional debut.
