= Dwight Smith (American football) =

American football player (born 1978)

No. 26, 24
- Position: Safety

Personal information
- Born: August 13, 1978 (age 48); Detroit, Michigan, U.S.
- Listed height: 5 ft 10 in (1.78 m)
- Listed weight: 201 lb (91 kg)

Career information
- High school: Central (Detroit)
- College: Akron
- NFL draft: 2001: 3rd round, 84th overall pick

Career history
- Tampa Bay Buccaneers (2001–2004); New Orleans Saints (2005); Minnesota Vikings (2006–2007); Detroit Lions (2008)

Awards and highlights
- Super Bowl champion (XXXVII); Consensus All-American (2000); MAC Defensive Player of the Year (2000); First-team All-MAC (2000); Second-team All-MAC (1999)

Career NFL statistics
- Total tackles: 477
- Sacks: 2
- Forced fumbles: 10
- Fumble recoveries: 4
- Interceptions: 22
- Defensive touchdowns: 1
- Stats at Pro Football Reference

Dwight L. Smith (born August 13, 1978) is an American former professional football player who was a safety for eight seasons in the National Football League (NFL). He played college football for the Akron Zips, earning consensus All-American honors. He was selected by the Tampa Bay Buccaneers in the third round of the 2001 NFL draft, and he also played in the NFL for the New Orleans Saints, Minnesota Vikings and Detroit Lions. Smith earned a Super Bowl ring with the Buccaneers in Super Bowl XXXVII.

== Early life ==
Smith was born in Detroit, Michigan. He attended Central High School in Detroit, and played high school football for the Central Trailblazers.

== College career ==
He attended the University of Akron, where he played for the Akron Zips football team from 1997 to 2000. As a senior in 2000, he had 10 interceptions and was recognized as a consensus first-team All-American at defensive back along with being a finalist for the Thorpe Award.

== Professional career ==
Pre-draft measurables
Height	Weight	Arm length	Hand span	40-yard dash	10-yard split	20-yard split	Vertical jump	Broad jump	Bench press
5 ft 9 5/8 in (1.77 m)	212 lb (96 kg)	29 1/2 in (0.75 m)	9 in (0.23 m)	4.57 s	1.65 s	2.65 s	33.5 in (0.85 m)	9 ft 6 in (2.90 m)	15 reps
All values from NFL Combine

=== Tampa Bay Buccaneers ===
Smith began his career with the Tampa Bay Buccaneers from 2001 to 2004. Smith's career highlight came in the Bucs' 48–21 victory over the Oakland Raiders in Super Bowl XXXVII, in which Smith intercepted two passes from quarterback Rich Gannon, returning both for touchdowns. He was the first player ever to score 2 touchdowns on interception returns in Super Bowl history.

=== New Orleans Saints ===
Before the 2005 season he signed with the New Orleans Saints and played for them for a season. He was released in July 2006, after failed attempts to trade him.

=== Minnesota Vikings ===
Smith signed a three-year deal with the Vikings in July 2006. On February 20, 2008, the Vikings released him.

=== Detroit Lions ===
On February 27, 2008, he signed with the Detroit Lions. He received $5 million over 2 years. The deal reunited Smith with Lions' head coach Rod Marinelli and defensive coordinator Joe Barry, both of whom were assistants on the Tampa Bay staff when the veteran safety spent the first four seasons of his NFL career as a standout Bucs' defender.

Smith was released by the Lions on February 9, 2009.

== NFL career statistics ==
Legend
**Bold**	Career high

=== Regular season ===
Year	Team	Games		Tackles					Interceptions					Fumbles			
Year	Team	GP	GS	Cmb	Solo	Ast	Sck	TFL	Int	Yds	TD	Lng	PD	FF	FR	Yds	TD
2001	TAM	15	0	28	23	5	0.0	0	0	0	0	0	3	1	**2**	0	0
2002	TAM	**16**	2	44	41	3	0.0	2	4	39	0	35	8	1	0	0	0
2003	TAM	**16**	**16**	74	62	12	0.0	1	**5**	3	0	3	10	1	0	0	0
2004	TAM	**16**	**16**	**86**	**75**	11	0.0	3	3	13	0	13	**13**	**3**	0	0	0
2005	NOR	15	15	73	63	10	**1.0**	**8**	2	53	0	28	7	2	0	0	0
2006	MIN	15	14	79	63	**16**	**1.0**	4	4	81	0	47	7	1	1	**5**	0
2007	MIN	14	13	52	45	7	0.0	2	4	**112**	**1**	**93**	9	1	0	0	0
2008	DET	10	7	41	33	8	0.0	1	0	0	0	0	2	0	1	0	0
		117	83	477	405	72	2.0	21	22	301	1	93	59	10	4	5	0

=== Playoffs ===
Year	Team	Games		Tackles					Interceptions					Fumbles			
Year	Team	GP	GS	Cmb	Solo	Ast	Sck	TFL	Int	Yds	TD	Lng	PD	FF	FR	Yds	TD
2001	TAM	1	0	1	1	0	0.0	0	0	0	0	0	0	0	0	0	0
2002	TAM	**3**	**1**	**12**	**12**	0	0.0	0	**3**	**100**	**2**	**50**	**3**	0	**1**	0	0
		4	1	13	13	0	0.0	0	3	100	2	50	3	0	1	0	0
