= Kevin Williams (defensive tackle) =

American football player (born 1980)

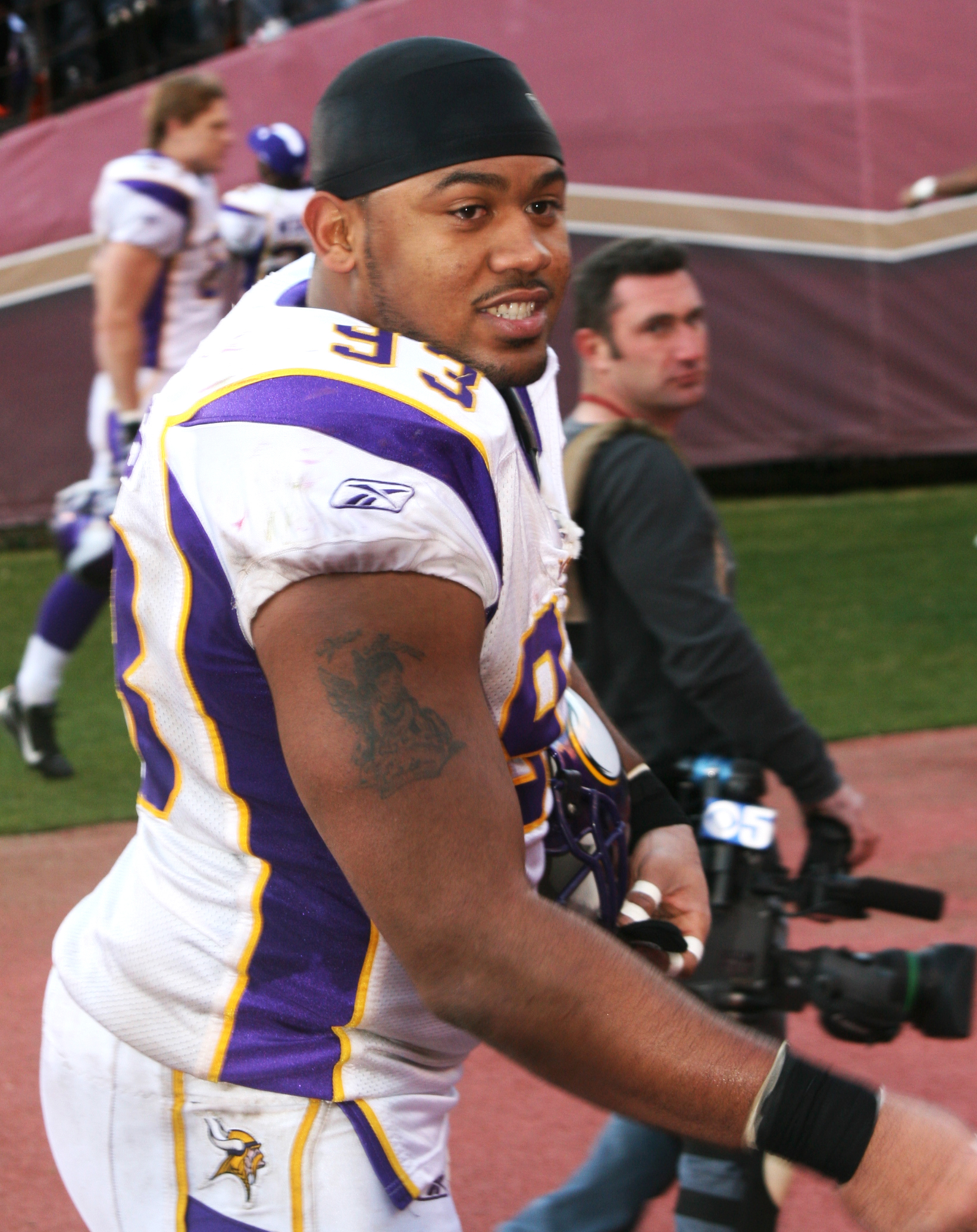
- Williams with the Minnesota Vikings in 2007

No. 93, 94
- Position: Defensive tackle

Personal information
- Born: August 16, 1980 (age 46); Arkadelphia, Arkansas, U.S.
- Listed height: 6 ft 5 in (1.96 m)
- Listed weight: 311 lb (141 kg)

Career information
- High school: Fordyce (Fordyce, Arkansas)
- College: Oklahoma State (1999–2002)
- NFL draft: 2003: 1st round, 9th overall pick

Career history
- Minnesota Vikings (2003–2013); Seattle Seahawks (2014); New Orleans Saints (2015)

Awards and highlights
- 5× First-team All-Pro (2004, 2006–2009); 6× Pro Bowl (2004, 2006–2010); NFL 2000s All-Decade Team; PFWA All-Rookie Team (2003); Minnesota Vikings Ring of Honor; 50 Greatest Vikings; Minnesota Vikings All-Mall of America Field Team

Career NFL statistics
- Total tackles: 528
- Sacks: 63
- Forced fumbles: 10
- Fumble recoveries: 13
- Interceptions: 5
- Defensive touchdowns: 4
- Stats at Pro Football Reference

Kevin Williams (born August 16, 1980) is an American former professional football player who was a defensive tackle in the National Football League (NFL). He played college football for the Oklahoma State Cowboys. He was selected by the Minnesota Vikings ninth overall in the 2003 NFL draft.

== College career ==
Williams attended Oklahoma State University, where he was a mainstay on the Oklahoma State Cowboys football team's defensive front, starting 42 games during his career. He recorded 160 tackles, 38 tackles for loss, and 18.5 sacks during his career and was an integral part of a team that improved from 3–8 with 1 win in the conference in 2000 to an 8–5 overall record with a 5-3 conference mark in 2002. The Cowboys' Houston Bowl appearance in 2002 was only the second time in 14 years that OSU made it to a bowl game.

== Professional career ==
=== 2003 NFL draft ===
After an outstanding performance during the Senior Bowl, Williams went from a marginal first round choice to a possible top 12 pick for the 2003 NFL draft in most scouts' estimation. However, he was considered a “classic one-year wonder” and compared to Gerard Warren by Stewart Mandel of Sports Illustrated. Others considered Williams "a more natural end" and suggested a move to the edge in the NFL. The Vikings were actually slotted as the 7th team for the 1st round of the draft, but when their 15 minutes on the clock expired, two other teams rushed in and made selections (Jacksonville took Byron Leftwich and Carolina selected Jordan Gross) before Minnesota finally got to choose Williams.

Pre-draft measurables
Height	Weight	Arm length	Hand span	40-yard dash	10-yard split	20-yard split	20-yard shuttle	Three-cone drill	Vertical jump	Broad jump	Bench press
6 ft 4 7/8 in (1.95 m)	304 lb (138 kg)	33 in (0.84 m)	9 in (0.23 m)	4.81 s	1.68 s	2.79 s	5.04 s	7.66 s	30 in (0.76 m)	9 ft 4 in (2.84 m)	23 reps
All values from NFL Combine

=== Minnesota Vikings ===
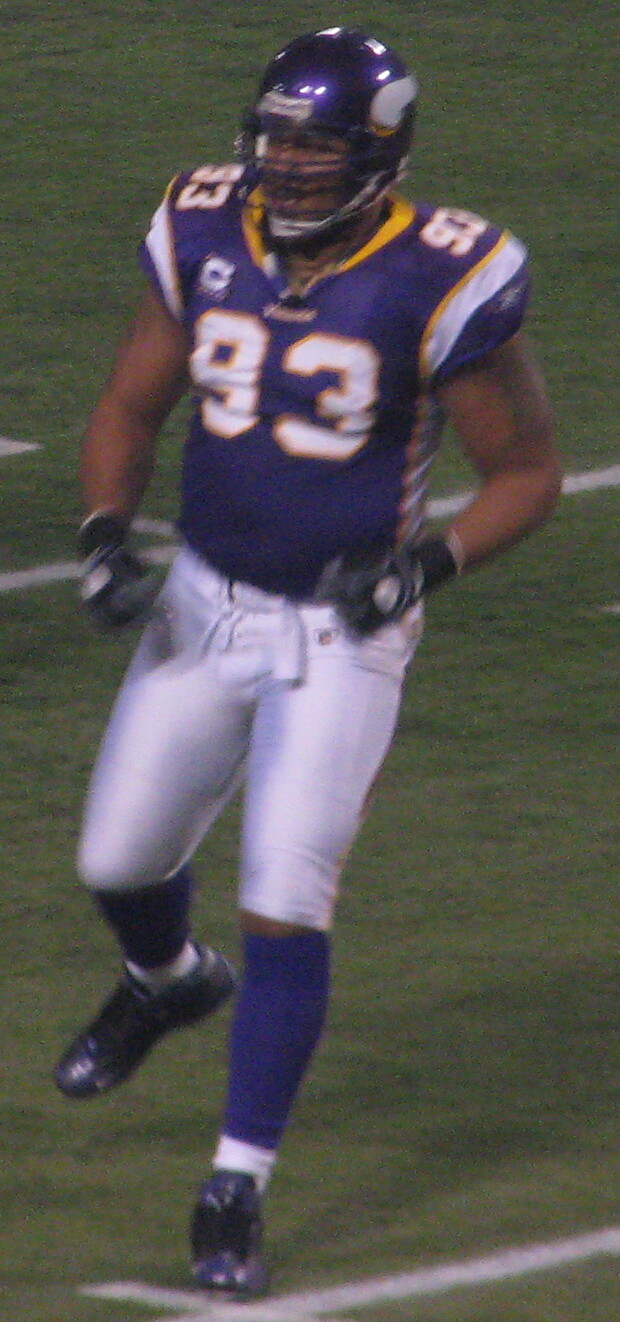
Williams with the Vikings in Jan. 2009

In 2003, Williams was one of the top impact rookie defenders in team history and led the Vikings with 10.5 sacks, the 2nd-most sacks by a Vikings rookie behind Keith Millard's 11.0 in 1985. He was a consensus All-Rookie team honoree having started opening 12 games of the season at left defensive end and moved inside to start at nose tackle for the final 4 games. He set the Vikings rookie record with 3.0 sacks in season finale at Arizona on December 28. Williams was named NFC Defensive Rookie of the Month when he had 18 tackles, 5.0 sacks, a forced fumble and an interception in the 4-game stretch and joined Carl Eller (1964) and Al Noga (1988) as the only rookie defensive ends in team history to start the season opener when he debuted in the lineup at Green Bay September 7 and also joined defensive end Lance Johnstone as players with 10.0+ sacks, the first time in Vikings history since 1993 when Chris Doleman and John Randle accomplished the feat.

Williams compiled 11.5 sacks in 2004, 4 in 2005, and 5 in 2006. Williams played under tackle in the Vikings 4–3 defense, with teammate Pat Williams manning the nose tackle position. They were known collectively as the "Williams Wall" as well as the "Williams Wrecking Crew" due to their physical presence at the line of scrimmage, an attribute that helped them lead the Vikings to the best rushing defense in the league for three consecutive seasons (2006–2008).

On December 23, 2006, the Minnesota Vikings signed him to a new 7-year contract extension that could reach $50 million with incentives, the contract also included $16 million in guaranteed money.

In 2007, during the NFL Kickoff game, Williams intercepted Atlanta Falcons quarterback Joey Harrington and ran 54 yards for a touchdown in the 1st quarter. This was the Vikings' first TD for the 2007 season. In week 14 of the same season, Williams intercepted San Francisco 49ers quarterback Trent Dilfer and returned the pick for a touchdown in the 1st quarter. It was the first touchdown of the game and Williams' second interception touchdown of the season.

On December 2, 2008, he received a four-game suspension for use of a diuretic, which can be used a masking agent for steroid use. It is believed that the diuretic was found in a weight-loss supplement that he had been taking. Williams, along with Pat Williams, appealed the suspension to a Minnesota federal court; the judge ruled against the NFL's decision and allowed all suspended players, including Williams, to play until a further review of the case. The case review had been ongoing through the entire 2009 and 2010 NFL seasons, but in 2011, he was suspended for only 2 games under the rules of the new Collective Bargaining Agreement.

=== Seattle Seahawks ===
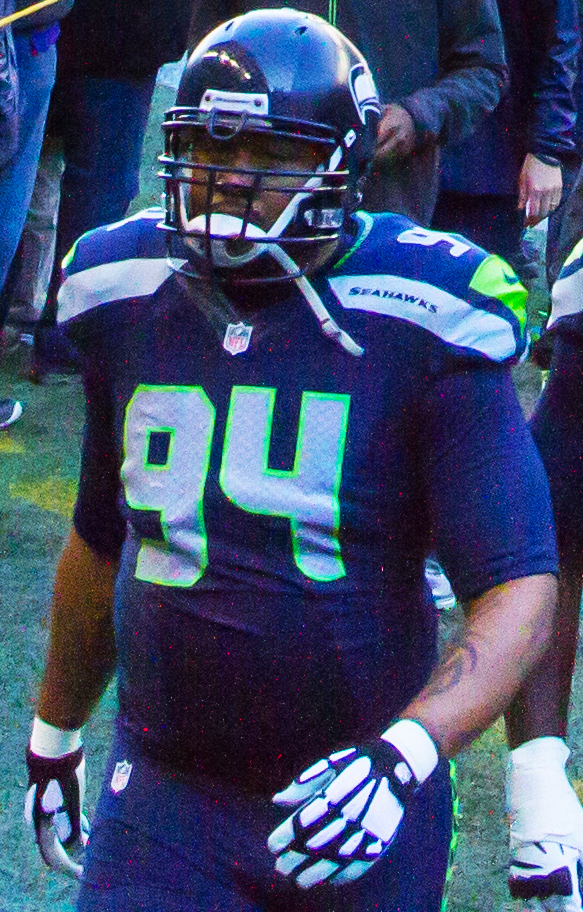
Williams with the Seahawks in 2014

On June 12, 2014, Williams signed a one-year contract with the Seattle Seahawks in excess of $2 million. He would play all 16 games for the Seahawks that season, recording 30 tackles, 3 sacks, 2 pass deflections, and 6 tackles for loss on the #1 defense in points allowed in the league. Williams played in his first career Super Bowl in Super Bowl XLIX. In the Super Bowl, Williams recorded 3 tackles, but the Seahawks lost 28–24 to the New England Patriots.

=== New Orleans Saints ===
The New Orleans Saints signed Williams to a one-year contract on June 12, 2015. He blocked an extra point during the Saints Week 12 matchup against the Carolina Panthers. Stephone Anthony picked it up and returned it for two points, becoming the first person to do so.

=== Retirement ===
On July 27, 2016, Williams signed a one-day contract with the Minnesota Vikings before announcing his retirement from professional football.

== NFL career statistics ==
Year	Team	GP	Tackles				Fumbles			Interceptions					
Year	Team	GP	Cmb	Solo	Ast	Sck	FF	FR	Yds	Int	Yds	Avg	Lng	TD	PD
2003	MIN	16	51	36	15	10.5	0	1	0	1	3	3	3	0	4
2004	MIN	16	70	52	18	11.5	2	3	77	1	7	7.0	7	0	8
2005	MIN	14	42	30	12	4.0	0	1	6	0	0	0.0	0	0	7
2006	MIN	16	36	28	8	5.0	0	3	0	0	0	0.0	0	0	6
2007	MIN	16	38	30	8	3.0	1	1	15	2	72	36.0	54	2	6
2008	MIN	16	60	45	15	8.5	1	0	0	0	0	0.0	0	0	4
2009	MIN	16	30	22	8	6.0	1	1	0	0	0	0.0	0	0	7
2010	MIN	16	39	27	12	1.0	1	0	0	0	0	0.0	0	0	10
2011	MIN	14	38	25	13	5.0	1	0	0	0	0	0.0	0	0	2
2012	MIN	16	30	19	11	2.0	0	2	0	0	0	0.0	0	0	7
2013	MIN	15	29	17	12	3.5	0	1	0	1	0	0.0	0	0	4
2014	SEA	16	30	18	13	3.0	0	0	0	0	0	0.0	0	0	2
2015	NO	16	32	18	14	0.0	2	0	0	0	0	0.0	0	0	3
Career		203	525	367	158	63.0	9	13	98	5	82	16.4	54	2	68

== Personal life ==
Williams graduated from Fordyce High School in 1998, where many of his individual football records still stand. Williams married in June 2005 to Tasha, who ended her collegiate basketball career in 2006 as a senior at Louisiana Tech and helped the Lady Techsters to the NCAA Tournament, earning all-conference honors. Kevin majored in general studies and earned his degree in the spring of 2003 from Oklahoma State.
