= Pat Williams (American football) =

American football player (born 1972)

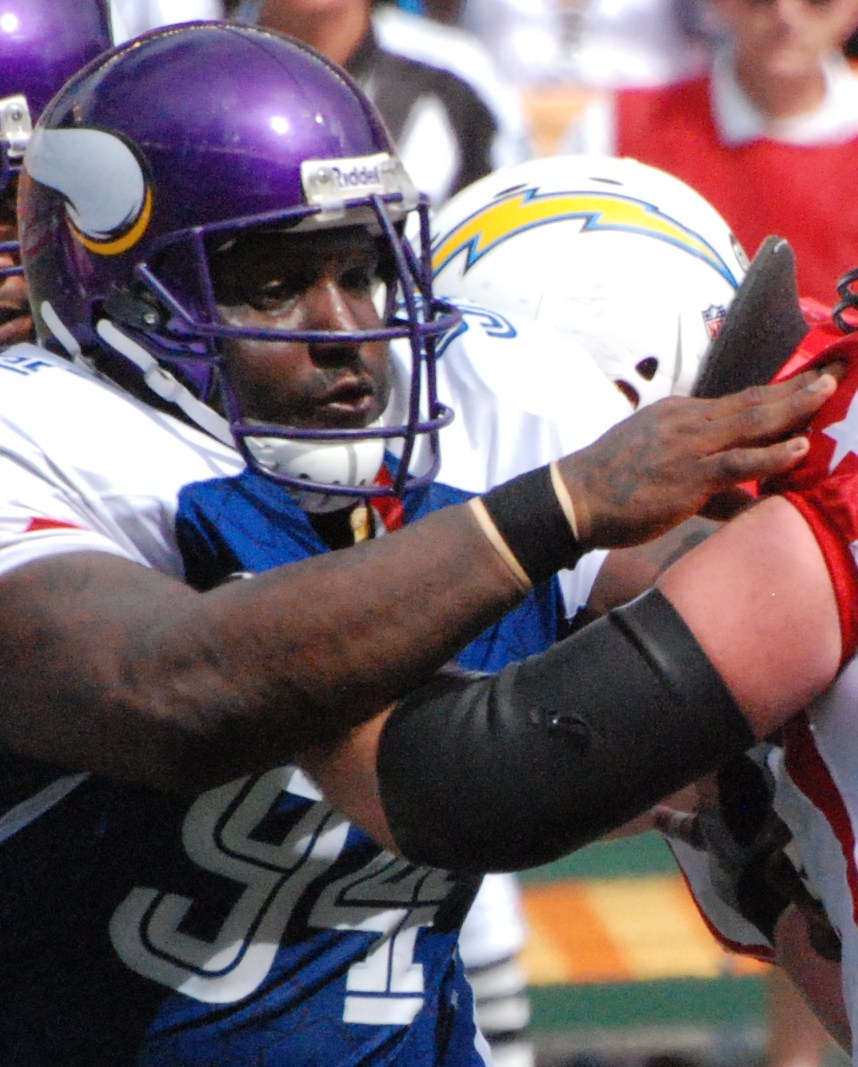
- Williams in the 2009 Pro Bowl

No. 93, 94
- Position: Defensive tackle

Personal information
- Born: October 24, 1972 (age 54); Monroe, Louisiana, U.S.
- Listed height: 6 ft 3 in (1.91 m)
- Listed weight: 317 lb (144 kg)

Career information
- High school: Wossman (Monroe)
- College: NE State; Texas A&M
- NFL draft: 1997: undrafted

Career history
- Buffalo Bills (1997–2004); Minnesota Vikings (2005–2010)

Awards and highlights
- Second-team All-Pro (2007); 3× Pro Bowl (2006–2008); Second-team All-SWC (1995)

Career NFL statistics
- Total tackles: 672
- Sacks: 20.5
- Forced fumbles: 8
- Fumble recoveries: 9
- Interceptions: 1
- Defensive touchdowns: 2
- Stats at Pro Football Reference

Patrick Williams Sr. (born October 24, 1972) is an American former professional football player who was a defensive tackle for 14 seasons in the National Football League (NFL). He played college football for the Texas A&M Aggies. He was signed by the Buffalo Bills as an undrafted free agent in 1997. Williams also played for the Minnesota Vikings, with whom he was a three-time Pro Bowl selection.

== College career ==
After graduating from Wossman High School in Monroe, Louisiana, Williams attended Navarro College, where he was a two-time junior college All-American in 1992 and 1993. He initially transferred to Texas A&M University in 1994, but failed the math portion of a junior-college exit exam and was ruled ineligible for the 1994 season. He transferred again to Northeastern Oklahoma A&M College, where he graduated in 1995, before returning to Texas A&M. Williams earned 2nd-team All-SWC as a junior in 1995 in only 6 starts. He also started 8 games and appeared in 11 as a senior.

== Professional career ==
Pre-draft measurables
Height	Weight	Arm length	Hand span	40-yard dash	10-yard split	20-yard split	20-yard shuttle	Three-cone drill	Vertical jump	Broad jump	Bench press
6 ft 3 1/8 in (1.91 m)	288 lb (131 kg)	34 in (0.86 m)	9 5/8 in (0.24 m)	4.90 s	1.68 s	2.89 s	4.72 s	8.36 s	26.5 in (0.67 m)	7 ft 9 in (2.36 m)	24 reps

=== Buffalo Bills ===
Williams went undrafted in the 1997 NFL draft, and signed with the Buffalo Bills as an undrafted free agent the same year. He played in just one game his rookie season. During the 1998–2000 seasons, he was a regular contributor, but did not become a regular starter until the 2001 season. In 2000, he was named to USA Today's All-Joe Team, recognizing the NFL's most "overlooked, ignored and hard-working" players. Williams intercepted his first career pass and returned it 20 yards for a touchdown, picking off Miami Dolphins quarterback A. J. Feeley on December 5, 2004, sealing the win for Buffalo 42-32 and breaking open a 3-point game with 1:55 left to play. Williams was named 2003 winner of the Ed Block Courage Award by his teammates. During his final four seasons with the Bills (2001–2004), he started in all but four games. He became a free agent after the 2004 season.

=== Minnesota Vikings ===
Prior to the 2005 season, Williams signed with the Minnesota Vikings, the 1st signing for the team in 2005 free agency and a priority signing. Following an advice by then defensive coordinator Mike Tomlin, Williams lost 15 pounds in the offseason. Williams played nose tackle in the Minnesota Vikings 4-3 defense, with teammate Kevin Williams playing the Under Tackle position. They were known collectively as the "Williams Wall" as well as the "Williams Wrecking Crew" due to their physical presence at the line of scrimmage, an attribute that helped them lead the Vikings to the best rushing defense in the league for three consecutive seasons (2006–2008). As a player for the Vikings, he was selected to his first Pro Bowl in 2006, and followed with consecutive selections in 2007 and 2008. He was also a second-team All-Pro selection in 2007.

On December 2, 2008, Pat and teammate Kevin Williams were suspended for 4 games by the league for violating its anti-doping policy, for use of a diuretic, which can be used as a masking agent for steroid use. It is believed that the diuretic was found in a weight-loss supplement that he had been taking. Williams, along with Kevin Williams, appealed the suspension to a Minnesota federal court; the judge ruled against the NFL's decision and allowed all suspended players, including Williams, to play until a further review of the case.

On April 28, 2011, the Minnesota Supreme Court declined to consider Williams' appeal of the case, clearing the way for the NFL to suspend Williams.

In the 2009 season, Williams made 44 tackles, 2 sacks, and 2 forced fumbles. He announced that he might retire after the season, but decided to come back for one more year in 2010. He was the oldest defensive player in the NFL.

On March 2, 2011, Williams announced that he would not re-sign with the Vikings for the 2011 season. "Everything’s good. I am not coming back. Going to go finish elsewhere." He ended his NFL career playing nose tackle when he retired.

On April 23, 2013, Pat Williams signed a one-day contract so that he could retire as a Minnesota Viking.

Pat Williams coaches at Wossman High School as a defensive line coach.

Pat Williams helped create a Lineman Academy located at the University of St. Thomas in St. Paul, Minnesota.

== NFL statistics ==
Year	Team	Games	Combined tackles	Tackles	Assisted tackles	Sacks	Forced fumbles	Fumble recoveries	Interceptions	Touchdowns
1998	BUF	13	12	11	1	3.5	0	0	0	0
1999	BUF	16	32	25	7	2.5	1	0	0	0
2000	BUF	16	55	37	18	2.5	1	2	0	0
2001	BUF	13	59	41	18	1.5	0	0	0	0
2002	BUF	16	83	53	30	0.5	1	1	0	0
2003	BUF	16	81	54	27	0.0	0	1	0	1
2004	BUF	16	53	37	16	2.5	0	1	1	1
2005	MIN	16	66	41	25	1.5	1	1	0	0
2006	MIN	16	44	37	7	1.0	1	0	0	0
2007	MIN	16	62	43	19	2.0	0	2	0	0
2008	MIN	14	44	31	13	1.0	0	1	0	0
2009	MIN	15	44	34	10	2.0	2	0	0	0
2010	MIN	16	30	22	8	0.0	1	0	0	0
Career	BUF/MIN	199	665	466	199	20.5	8	9	1	2
