= Aundrae Allison =

American football player (born 1984)

No. 84, 16
- Position: Wide receiver

Personal information
- Born: June 25, 1984 (age 42); Kannapolis, North Carolina, U.S.
- Listed height: 6 ft 0 in (1.83 m)
- Listed weight: 198 lb (90 kg)

Career information
- High school: A.L. Brown (Kannapolis)
- College: East Carolina
- NFL draft: 2007: 5th round, 146th overall pick

Career history
- Minnesota Vikings (2007–2008); New York Jets (2009); Virginia Destroyers (2011)*; Tampa Bay Buccaneers (2011)*; Virginia Destroyers (2011)
- * Offseason or practice squad member only

Awards and highlights
- UFL champion (2011); First-team All-Conference USA (2005); Second-team All-Conference USA (2006)

Career NFL statistics
- Receptions: 18
- Receiving yards: 231
- Return yards: 732
- Return touchdowns: 1
- Stats at Pro Football Reference

Aundrae Akeem Allison (born June 25, 1984) is an American former professional football player who was a wide receiver in the National Football League (NFL). He was selected by the Minnesota Vikings in the fifth round of the 2007 NFL draft. He played college football for the East Carolina Pirates.

He was also a member of the New York Jets, Virginia Destroyers, and Tampa Bay Buccaneers.

== Early life ==
Allison attended A. L. Brown High School in Kannapolis, North Carolina. He was an Associated Press All-State selection during his senior season and earned All-Conference honors twice.

== College career ==
=== Georgia Military College ===
Allison enrolled at Georgia Military College in Milledgeville, GA January 2003 after leaving Coffeyville JUCO. He made junior college all-American and also earned a two-year AAS degree from the prestigious school.

=== East Carolina University ===
Allison played college football at East Carolina University for two years. In 2005, Allison was the first player in school history to pick up over 1,000 reception yards with 83 catches for 1,024 yards. He had seven touchdowns in 11 games that season. Allison's 83 receptions are second in all-time single-season school history. In addition, Allison averaged 12.3 yards per reception and 93.1 yards per game (second best in Conference USA) and had five 100-yard receiving games, which was the most in a single season at ECU. Allison led the conference and was 4th nationally in receptions per game with 7.55. At the conclusion of the season, Allison was named a first-team All-Conference USA selection. During the 2006 season his production went down a bit, finishing with 62 receptions for 708 and four touchdowns. After the 2006 season, Allison entered the NFL draft.

=== Statistics ===
East Carolina statistics
Year	GP	Rec	Yds	YPC	TDs
2005	11	83	1024	12.3	7
2006	11	62	708	11.4	4
Totals	22	145	1732	12.0	11

== Professional career ==
Pre-draft measurables
Height	Weight	Arm length	Hand span	40-yard dash	10-yard split	20-yard split	20-yard shuttle	Three-cone drill	Vertical jump	Broad jump
6 ft 0 1/4 in (1.84 m)	198 lb (90 kg)	32 1/4 in (0.82 m)	9 in (0.23 m)	4.39 s	1.51 s	2.53 s	4.25 s	6.81 s	37.0 in (0.94 m)	10 ft 7 in (3.23 m)
All values from NFL Combine/Pro Day

=== Minnesota Vikings ===
Allison was selected by the Minnesota Vikings in the fifth round (146th overall) of the 2007 NFL draft.

During his rookie season with the Vikings, Allison served as a wide receiver and kickoff returner. In Week 13 against the Detroit Lions, Allison returned a kickoff 104 yards for a touchdown—a franchise record at the time. Although not starting, he appeared in 11 of 16 regular season games. He caught a total of 8 passes for 122 yds, and returned 20 kicks for 574 yards.

Allison recorded 10 receptions for 109 yards in 2008. After the team's failed attempts to trade him, Allison was waived by the Vikings on August 4, 2009.

=== New York Jets ===
Allison was claimed off waivers by the New York Jets on August 5, 2009. The team waived wide receiver Mario Urrutia to make room for Allison on the roster. Allison was sidelined for the 2009 season after suffering a torn ACL against the Philadelphia Eagles in the Jets final preseason game. Allison recovered and was preparing to maintain a spot on the active roster. This effort would be cut short as Allison was waived on August 29, 2010.

=== Virginia Destroyers (first stint) ===
Allison was selected by the Virginia Destroyers in the fourth round (19th overall) of the 2011 UFL draft. He signed with the team for the 2011 season on July 6, 2011.

=== Tampa Bay Buccaneers ===
On August 14, 2011, Allison signed with the Tampa Bay Buccaneers, but was waived on August 29.

=== Virginia Destroyers (second stint) ===
After being waived by the Buccaneers, Allison was re-signed by the Destroyers. The Destroyers, coached by NFL legend Marty Schottenheimer, would become the UFL champions with Allison leading the team in all receiving categories.

== Personal life ==
In 2010, Allison created the luxury fashion brand Wealthy War Intentions. The brand is co-owned by former New York Jets running back Chris Johnson, whom Allison went to college with.
