= 2010 Minnesota Vikings season =

50th season in franchise history

- Vikings 50th season logo
- Owner: Zygi Wilf
- Head coach: Brad Childress (fired on November 22; 3–7 record); Leslie Frazier (interim; 3–3 record)
- Home stadium: Mall of America Field at Hubert H. Humphrey Metrodome; Ford Field (Week 14) (Note: On December 12, 2010, the Metrodome's inflatable roof collapsed due to heavy snowfall, so the Vikings had to play at these stadiums for Weeks 14 and 15.); TCF Bank Stadium (Week 15)

Results
- Record: 6–10
- Division place: 4th NFC North
- Playoffs: Did not qualify
- All-Pros: RB Adrian Peterson (2nd team)
- Pro Bowlers: 4: RB Adrian Peterson (bench); DT Kevin Williams (withdrew); CB Antoine Winfield; LB E. J. Henderson (did not play)

Uniform
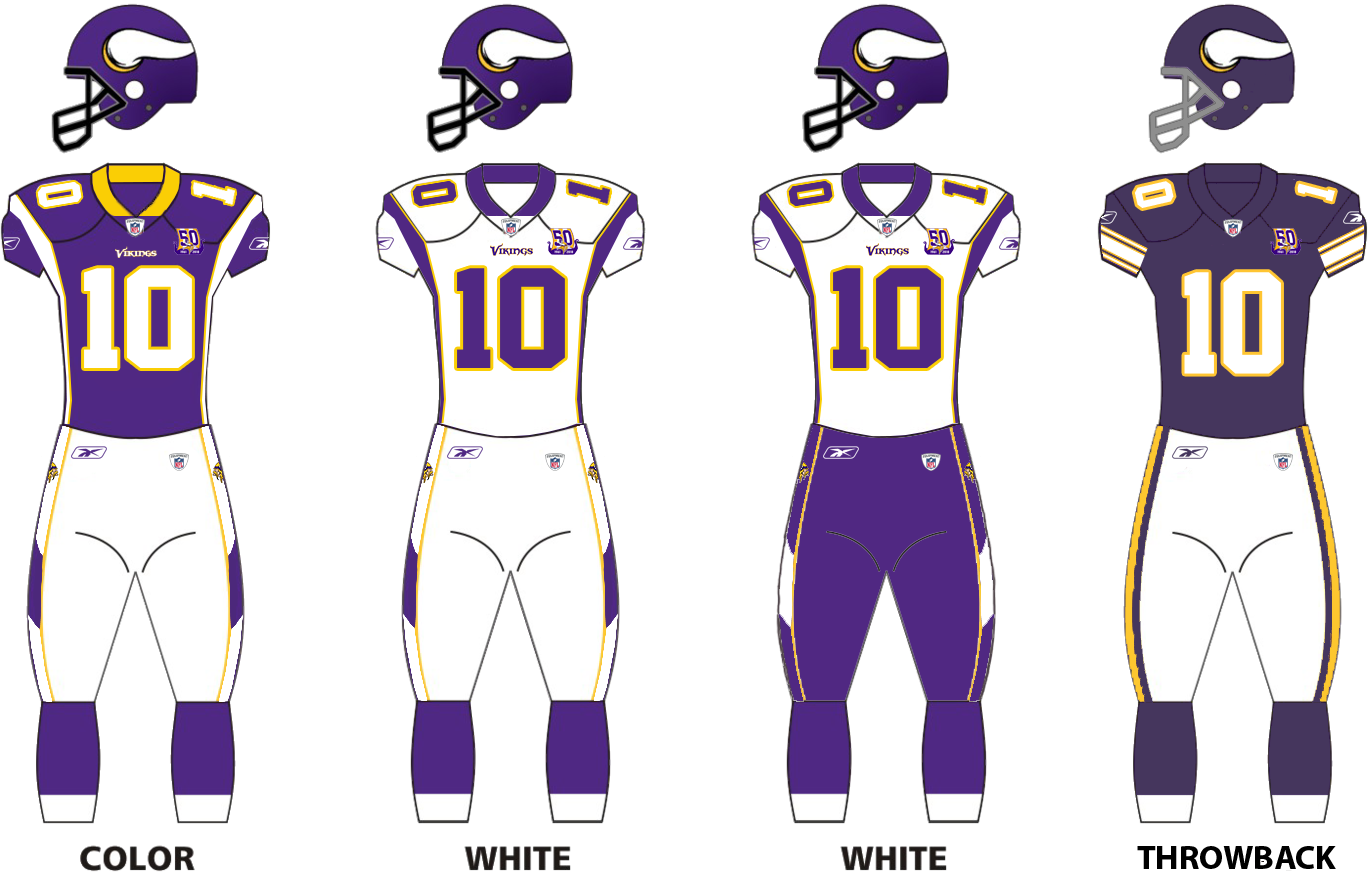

The 2010 season was the Minnesota Vikings' 50th in the National Football League (NFL), and the fifth and final under head coach Brad Childress. After a loss to the New Orleans Saints in the NFC Championship ended their 2009 season, the Vikings had hoped to defend their NFC North division title for the third year in a row and contend again for a Super Bowl championship. However, Brett Favre was unable to recover from the injuries he had sustained in the NFC Championship and turned in abysmal performances for most of the season, being forced to sit out three games due to injuries and breaking his consecutive start record at 297 games since September 1992. After the Vikings fell to a 3–7 record with a 31–3 division loss to the Green Bay Packers in week 11, Childress was fired and assistant head coach and defensive coordinator Leslie Frazier was named as his interim replacement, going 3–3 in his six games in charge before taking over the job permanently at the end of the season. The team finished 6–10 and ended up in last place in the division for the first time since 1990. The Vikings also missed the playoffs for the first time since 2007.

This season also saw the return of star wide receiver Randy Moss, as the Vikings traded a third-round draft pick to the New England Patriots in exchange for Moss and a 2012 seventh-round selection. Although it was his first time back with the Vikings since 2004, Moss was waived after only a month in Minnesota, before being claimed off waivers by the Tennessee Titans, where he played the remainder of the season before retiring at the end of the season. It was also quarterback Brett Favre's 20th and final season in the NFL; Favre had started 321 straight games from 1992 to 2010, and retired as the all-time leader in consecutive starts made by a quarterback. Favre was also the last remaining active player to win a Super Bowl in the 1990s, having led the Packers to their third Super Bowl title in 1997.

Further woes befell the team when wide receiver Percy Harvin missed two games due to persistent migraine headaches. On December 12, the Hubert H. Humphrey Metrodome's inflatable roof collapsed for the first time since 1986 after a heavy snowfall. As a consequence, the Vikings had to play that week's game against the Giants at Detroit's Ford Field on Monday night. Since the Metrodome's roof could not be repaired in time, the team was forced to play the Bears in Week 15 at TCF Bank Stadium for their first outdoor home game since 1981.

== Offseason ==
=== Transactions ===
In April 2010, the Vikings re-signed restricted free agents Ryan Cook (offensive tackle), Fred Evans (defensive tackle), Eric Frampton (safety) and Naufahu Tahi (fullback). A week later, on April 21, they signed cornerback Lito Sheppard to a one-year contract after his release by the New York Jets. They then added wide receiver Marquis Hamilton and offensive tackle Bill Noethlich to their roster in the first week of May.

During the 2010 preseason, the Vikings were struggling at the wide receiver position and signed free agent Javon Walker – who had been released by the Oakland Raiders in April – before trading cornerback Benny Sapp to the Miami Dolphins in exchange for Greg Camarillo. A week later, the Vikings waived the contracts of Bill Noethlich and Marko Mitchell, placed J Leman on the injured reserve list and designated Sidney Rice as Physically Unable to Perform.

On September 3, the Vikings traded Sage Rosenfels and Darius Reynaud to the New York Giants for a fifth-round pick in the 2011 draft and a conditional seventh-round pick in 2012. Rosenfels became expendable to the Vikings when Brett Favre decided to return for the 2010 season.

=== 2010 draft ===
Pro Bowler

2010 Minnesota Vikings Draft
Draft order		Player name	Position	College	Contract	Notes
Round	Selection	Player name	Position	College	Contract	Notes
1	30	Traded to the Detroit Lions (Note: The Vikings traded first- and fourth-round selections (30th and 128th overall) to the Lions in exchange for second-, fourth-, and seventh-round selections (34th, 100th and 214th overall).)				
2	34	Chris Cook	CB	Virginia	4 years, $5.37 million	From Lions
2	51	Toby Gerhart	RB	Stanford	4 years, $3.767 million	From Texans (Note: The Vikings traded second- and third-round selections (62nd and 93rd overall) to the Texans in exchange for a second-round selection (51st overall).)
2	62	Traded to the Houston Texans				
3	93	Traded to the Houston Texans				
4	100	Everson Griffen	DE	USC	4 years, $2.33 million	From Lions
4	128	Traded to the Detroit Lions				
5	161	Chris DeGeare	OT	Wake Forest	4 years, $1.95 million	
5	167	Nathan Triplett	LB	Minnesota	4 years, $1.942 million	Compensatory pick (Note: The Vikings were awarded a fifth-round compensatory pick for the loss of free agents C Matt Birk and S Darren Sharper.)
6	199	Joe Webb	QB	UAB	4 years, $1.882 million	
7	214	Mickey Shuler Jr.	TE	Penn State	4 years, $1.85 million	From Browns via Lions
7	237	Ryan D'Imperio	LB	Rutgers	4 years, $1.837 million	

=== Undrafted free agents ===
Name	Position	College
R.J. Archer	Quarterback	William & Mary
Thomas Austin	Guard	Clemson
Adrian Battles	Guard	Minnesota State
Marquis Hamilton	Wide receiver	Iowa State
Tommy Hernandez	Center	UC Davis
Cedric McKinley	Defensive end	Minnesota
Bill Noethlich	Tackle	Southwest Minnesota State
Marcus Sherels	Cornerback	Minnesota
Terrell Skinner	Safety	Maryland
Ray Small	Wide receiver	Ohio State

== Staff ==
2010 Minnesota Vikings staff
Front office: Owner/chairman – Zygi Wilf; Owner/president – Mark Wilf; Owner/vice chairman – Leonard Wilf; Vice president of football operations – Rob Brzezinski; Vice president of player personnel – Rick Spielman; Director of player personnel – George Paton; Director of college scouting – Scott Studwell; Assistant director of college scouting – Jamaal Stephenson; Head coaches: Head coach – Brad Childress; Interim head coach/defensive coordinator – Leslie Frazier; Assistant head coach-offense/running backs – Eric Bieniemy; Assistant to the head coach – Dennis Polian; Offensive coaches: Offensive coordinator – Darrell Bevell; Quarterbacks – Kevin Rogers; Assistant quarterbacks – Kevin Stefanski; Wide receivers – George Stewart; Assistant wide receivers – Ryan Ficken; Tight ends – Jimmie Johnson; Offensive line – Pat Morris; Assistant offensive line – Jim Hueber	Defensive coaches: Defensive line – Karl Dunbar; Defensive line – Ryan Silverfield; Assistant defensive line – Diron Reynolds; Linebackers – Fred Pagac; Defensive backs/secondary – Joe Woods; Assistant defensive backs/secondary – Matt Sheldon; Defensive assistant – Jeff Imamura; Special teams coaches: Special teams coordinator – Brian Murphy; Assistant special teams – Chris White; Strength and conditioning: Head athletic trainer/director of sports medicine – Eric Sugarman; Strength and conditioning – Tom Kanavy; Assistant strength and conditioning – Juney Barnett; Assistant strength and conditioning – Martin Streight; Assistant strength and conditioning – Chaz Mahle

== Roster ==
2010 Minnesota Vikings roster
Quarterbacks (QB): 3 Rhett Bomar; 4 Brett Favre; 9 Patrick Ramsey; 14 Joe Webb; Running backs (RB): 27 Lorenzo Booker KR; 32 Toby Gerhart; 28 Adrian Peterson; 38 Naufahu Tahi FB; Wide receivers (WR): 19 Hank Baskett; 87 Bernard Berrian; 85 Greg Camarillo PR; 12 Percy Harvin; 13 Juaquin Iglesias; 17 Greg Lewis; 18 Sidney Rice; Tight ends (TE): 83 Jeff Dugan; 40 Jim Kleinsasser; 81 Visanthe Shiancoe	Offensive linemen (OL): 79 Patrick Brown T; 62 Ryan Cook G/C; 68 Jon Cooper C; 72 Chris DeGeare G; 71 Phil Loadholt T; 74 Bryant McKinnie T; 65 John Sullivan C; 66 Thomas Welch T; Defensive linemen (DL): 69 Jared Allen DE; 91 Ray Edwards DE; 90 Fred Evans DT; 97 Everson Griffen DE; 98 Letroy Guion DT; 73 Jimmy Kennedy DT; 96 Brian Robison DE; 93 Kevin Williams DT; 94 Pat Williams DT	Linebackers (LB): 54 Jasper Brinkley MLB; 59 Heath Farwell OLB; 52 Chad Greenway OLB; 56 E. J. Henderson MLB; 50 Erin Henderson OLB; 51 Ben Leber OLB; 55 Kenny Onatolu OLB; Defensive backs (DB): 39 Husain Abdullah SS; 21 Asher Allen CB; 37 Eric Frampton SS; 33 Jamarca Sanford FS; 29 Lito Sheppard CB; 35 Marcus Sherels CB; 41 Frank Walker CB; 26 Antoine Winfield CB; Special teams (ST): 5 Chris Kluwe P; 46 Cullen Loeffler LS; 8 Ryan Longwell K	Practice squad: 89 Freddie Brown WR; 22 Simeon Castille CB; 44 Ryan D'Imperio FB; 95 Tremaine Johnson DT; 78 Seth Olsen G; 24 Cord Parks CB; 30 DeAndre Wright CB; Reserve: 31 Chris Cook CB (IR); 23 Cedric Griffin CB (IR); 64 Anthony Herrera G (IR); 76 Steve Hutchinson G (IR); 7 Tarvaris Jackson QB (IR); 11 Jaymar Johnson WR (IR); 25 Tyrell Johnson S (IR); 20 Madieu Williams FS (IR); 34 Albert Young RB (IR); Rookies in italics 53 active, 9 reserve, 7 practice squad

== Preseason ==
=== Schedule ===
The Vikings preseason schedule was announced on March 31, 2010.

Week	Date	Opponent	Result	Record	Venue	NFL.com recap
1	August 14	at St. Louis Rams	W 28–7	1–0	Edward Jones Dome	Recap
2	August 22	at San Francisco 49ers	L 10–15	1–1	Candlestick Park	Recap
3	August 28	Seattle Seahawks	W 24–13	2–1	Mall of America Field	Recap
4	September 2	Denver Broncos	W 31–24	3–1	Mall of America Field	Recap

=== Game summaries ===
==== Week 1: at St. Louis Rams ====
Preseason Week 1: Minnesota Vikings at St. Louis Rams – Game summary

Quarter	1	2	3	4	Total
Vikings	0	14	7	7	28
Rams	7	0	0	0	7

at Edward Jones Dome, St. Louis, Missouri

- Date: August 14
- Game time: 19:00
- Game weather: None (indoor stadium)
- Game attendance: 40,801
- Referee: Clete Blakeman (34)
- Recap, Game Book

Game information

First quarter

- STL – Danny Amendola 93-yard punt return (Shaun Suisham kick), 1:29. Rams 7–0.

Second quarter

- MIN – Logan Payne 2-yard pass from Sage Rosenfels (Ryan Longwell kick), 12:13. Tied 7–7. Drive: 5 plays, 16 yards, 2:33.
- MIN – Garrett Mills 65-yard pass from Sage Rosenfels (Ryan Longwell kick), 6:45. Vikings 14–7. Drive: 3 plays, 64 yards, 0:52.

Third quarter

- MIN – Marko Mitchell 71-yard pass from Sage Rosenfels (Rhys Lloyd kick), 3:14. Vikings 21–7. Drive: 3 plays, 82 yards, 1:12.

Fourth quarter

- MIN – Mickey Shuler Jr. 2-yard pass from Joe Webb (Rhys Lloyd kick), 6:49. Vikings 28–7. Drive: 13 plays, 63 yards, 6:48.

Top passers

- MIN – Sage Rosenfels – 23/34, 310 yards, 3 TD
- STL – Sam Bradford – 6/13, 57 yards

Top rushers

- MIN – Toby Gerhart – 8 rushes, 24 yards
- STL – Keith Toston – 4 rushes, 16 yards

Top receivers

- MIN – Garrett Mills – 4 receptions, 106 yards, TD
- STL – Chris Ogbonnaya – 4 receptions, 31 yards

The Vikings began their 2010 pre-season with a trip to Edward Jones Dome to take on the league's worst team from 2009, the St. Louis Rams. The Rams roster featured rookie quarterback Sam Bradford, signed as the #1 overall pick in the 2010 NFL draft. Meanwhile, the Vikings were without six members of their regular starting offense, including QB Brett Favre and RB Adrian Peterson. The Rams got the first touchdown of the game with 1:29 remaining in the first quarter, when Danny Amendola returned a Chris Kluwe punt for 93 yards. The Vikings responded with two TDs in the second quarter; first, backup QB Sage Rosenfels passed for two yards to wide receiver Logan Payne, before throwing a 65-yard TD pass to tight end Garrett Mills. Rosenfels got his third passing TD in the third quarter, with a 71-yard pass to WR Marko Mitchell. The victory was completed with 6:49 left in the game as fellow rookies – QB Joe Webb and TE Mickey Shuler Jr. – combined for a two-yard pass.

==== Week 2: at San Francisco 49ers ====
Preseason Week 2: Minnesota Vikings at San Francisco 49ers – Game summary

Quarter	1	2	3	4	Total
Vikings	0	3	0	7	10
49ers	7	0	3	5	15

at Candlestick Park, San Francisco, California

- Date: August 22
- Game time: 19:00
- Game weather: Sunny, 63 °F (17 °C)
- Game attendance: 69,732
- Referee: Bill Leavy (127)
- TV: NBC
- Recap, Game Book

Game information

First quarter

- SF – Anthony Dixon 4-yard run (Joe Nedney kick), 8:03. 49ers 7–0. Drive: 12 plays, 70 yards, 6:57.

Second quarter

- MIN – Ryan Longwell 40-yard field goal, 11:07. 49ers 7–3. Drive: 12 plays, 50 yards, 6:40.

Third quarter

- SF – Joe Nedney 28-yard field goal, 6:25. 49ers 10–3. Drive: 10 plays, 87 yards, 5:04.

Fourth quarter

- SF – Joe Nedney 31-yard field goal, 14:00. 49ers 13–3. Drive: 12 plays, 71 yards, 6:20.
- MIN – Joe Webb 48-yard run (Rhys Lloyd kick), 1:54. 49ers 13–10. Drive: 2 plays, 50 yards, 0:37.
- SF – Joe Webb sacked in the end zone by Derek Walker for a safety, 0:00. 49ers 15–10.

Top passers

- MIN – Joe Webb – 7/14, 47 yards
- SF – Nate Davis – 7/16, 114 yards

Top rushers

- MIN – Joe Webb – 3 rushes, 53 yards, TD
- SF – Anthony Dixon – 20 rushes, 51 yards, TD

Top receivers

- MIN – Adrian Peterson – 3 receptions, 25 yards
- SF – Ted Ginn Jr. – 2 receptions, 65 yards

The Vikings' second preseason game took them to San Francisco to take on the 49ers. The game marked the return of quarterback Brett Favre to the Vikings' starting lineup, but he lasted just four plays; the first was a 13-yard pass to RB Adrian Peterson for a first down, but he was sacked for a loss of 10 yards two plays later and was replaced by Tarvaris Jackson for the Vikings' next drive.

By the time Favre took the field, the 49ers were already leading 7–0 via a 4-yard run from Anthony Dixon. It was not until the 2nd quarter that the Vikings got their first points on the board, with Ryan Longwell landing a 40-yard field goal. San Francisco responded with two Joe Nedney field goals in the second half before the Vikings' rookie QB Joe Webb took advantage of a gap in the 49ers defense to rush 48 yards for a touchdown, bringing Minnesota within three points with two minutes left to play. Kicker Rhys Lloyd attempted an onside kick, but it was recovered by San Francisco, and by the time the Vikings got the ball back they were on their own 8-yard line with 9 seconds left in the game. They attempted to go for the win, but Webb was sacked in the end zone for a safety as the clock ran out, giving the 49ers a 15–10 win.

==== Week 3: vs. Seattle Seahawks ====
Preseason Week 3: Seattle Seahawks at Minnesota Vikings – Game summary

Quarter	1	2	3	4	Total
Seahawks	0	10	3	0	13
Vikings	0	10	0	14	24

at Mall of America Field at Hubert H. Humphrey Metrodome, Minneapolis, Minnesota

- Date: August 28
- Game time: 19:00
- Game weather: None (indoor stadium)
- Game attendance: 63,550
- Referee: Terry McAulay (77)
- Recap, Game Book

Game information

First quarter

- No scoring plays.

Second quarter

- SEA – Earl Thomas 86-yard interception return (Olindo Mare kick), 12:45. Seahawks 7–0.
- MIN – Adrian Peterson 24-yard run (Ryan Longwell kick), 11:45. Tied 7–7. Drive: 2 plays, 23 yards, 1:00.
- SEA – Olindo Mare 38-yard field goal, 8:26. Seahawks 10–7. Drive: 8 plays, 52 yards, 3:19.
- MIN – Ryan Longwell 28-yard field goal, 1:12. Tied 10–10. Drive: 14 plays, 66 yards, 7:14.

Third quarter

- SEA – Olindo Mare 34-yard field goal, 12:25. Seahawks 13–10. Drive: 5 plays, 57 yards, 0:51.

Fourth quarter

- MIN – Javon Walker 25-yard pass from Sage Rosenfels (Ryan Longwell kick), 7:09. Vikings 17–13. Drive: 10 plays, 87 yards, 4:48.
- MIN – Ryan D'Imperio 7-yard pass from Joe Webb (Ryan Longwell kick), 2:48. Vikings 24–13. Drive: 7 plays, 20 yards, 3:20.

Top passers

- SEA – Charlie Whitehurst – 12/26, 138 yards
- MIN – Brett Favre – 16/26, 187 yards

Top rushers

- SEA – Justin Forsett – 6 rushes, 20 yards
- MIN – Adrian Peterson – 11 rushes, 37 yards, TD

Top receivers

- SEA – Mike Williams – 3 receptions, 54 yards
- MIN – Greg Camarillo – 4 receptions, 47 yards

The Vikings returned to the Metrodome in Week 3 for the first time since their 2009 Divisional Play-off to take on the Seattle Seahawks. Quarterback Brett Favre lasted for eight series and threw for 187 yards on 16 completions, but the Vikings only came away with 10 points while he was on the field. The first points of the game came from an interception of a Favre pass, as Seattle safety Earl Thomas got to the ball ahead of wide receiver Bernard Berrian and returned it for an 86-yard touchdown. Nevertheless, Darius Reynaud returned the ensuing kickoff for 73 yards, giving Adrian Peterson the opportunity to rush 23 yards in two plays to level the scores at 7–7. Olindo Mare and Ryan Longwell then traded field goals to make the scores 10–10 at halftime. Another field goal from Mare put the Seahawks ahead on their first drive of the second half, but the Vikings responded with a 25-yard touchdown pass from Sage Rosenfels to new wide receiver Javon Walker with just over seven minutes left in the game. Minnesota sealed the win with less than three minutes on the clock, when Joe Webb tossed the ball seven yards for fullback Ryan D'Imperio to return the Vikings to a winning preseason record.

==== Week 4: vs. Denver Broncos ====
Preseason Week 4: Denver Broncos at Minnesota Vikings – Game summary

Quarter	1	2	3	4	Total
Broncos	7	0	7	10	24
Vikings	7	10	7	7	31

at Mall of America Field at Hubert H. Humphrey Metrodome, Minneapolis, Minnesota

- Date: September 2
- Game time: 19:00
- Game weather: None (indoor stadium)
- Game attendance: 63,328
- Referee: Mike Carey (94)
- Recap, Game Book

Game information

First quarter

- DEN – LenDale White 2-yard run (Matt Prater kick), 6:08. Broncos 7–0. Drive: 10 plays, 58 yards, 4:46.
- MIN – Erin Henderson 35-yard fumble return (Ryan Longwell kick), 5:02. Tied 7–7.

Second quarter

- MIN – Ryan Longwell 27-yard field goal, 14:58. Vikings 10–7. Drive: 6 plays, 15 yards, 2:44.
- MIN – Albert Young 1-yard run (Ryan Longwell kick), 6:42. Vikings 17–7. Drive: 3 plays, 13 yards, 1:38.

Third quarter

- DEN – Matthew Willis 39-yard pass from Tim Tebow (Matt Prater kick), 11:39. Vikings 17–14. Drive: 6 plays, 78 yards, 3:21.
- MIN – Ian Johnson 4-yard run (Ryan Longwell kick), 7:09. Vikings 24–14. Drive: 7 plays, 76 yards, 4:30.

Fourth quarter

- DEN – Alric Arnett 14-yard pass from Brady Quinn (Matt Prater kick), 12:01. Vikings 24–21. Drive: 6 plays, 51 yards, 2:29.
- MIN – Javon Walker 63-yard pass from Joe Webb (Ryan Longwell kick), 10:07. Vikings 31–21. Drive: 4 plays, 80 yards, 1:54.
- DEN – Matt Prater 49-yard field goal, 4:44. Vikings 31–24. Drive: 13 plays, 58 yards, 5:23.

Top passers

- DEN – Tim Tebow – 12/16, 167 yards, TD
- MIN – Joe Webb – 5/9, 100 yards, TD

Top rushers

- DEN – Bruce Hall – 15 rushes, 33 yards
- MIN – Joe Webb – 4 rushes, 48 yards

Top receivers

- DEN – Matthew Willis – 5 receptions, 122 yards, TD
- MIN – Javon Walker – 4 receptions, 87 yards, TD

The Vikings completed their preseason schedule with a home game against the Denver Broncos. To accommodate the Vikings playing in the 2010 NFL Kickoff game the following Thursday, this game was also played on a Thursday, and head coach Brad Childress opted to rest the majority of his starting lineup. As in each of their three previous preseason games, the Vikings conceded the first points of the game, allowing LenDale White to rush two yards into the endzone and convert on 2nd-and-goal. The Vikings were unable to earn a first down on each of their first three series, but after punting on the third, the Broncos' rookie quarterback Tim Tebow fumbled the snap on their return drive; Erin Henderson picked up the loose ball and returned it 35 yards for a touchdown. Ryan Longwell put Minnesota ahead with a 27-yard field goal on the first play of the second quarter, and from that point the Vikings never relinquished their lead. Albert Young then converted a 1st-and-goal from the 1-yard line to give Minnesota a 10-point lead at halftime. The two teams traded touchdowns in the third quarter, as Tebow threw a 39-yard pass to Matthew Willis for Denver, and Ian Johnson rushed 4 yards for Minnesota. A 14-yard pass from Brady Quinn to Alric Arnett brought the Broncos to within three points going into the last 12 minutes of the game, but on the very next series, Joe Webb threw a 63-yard pass to a wide open Javon Walker on the right side of the field, and the wide receiver walked into the end zone. Broncos kicker Matt Prater completed the scoring with a 49-yard field goal with just under five minutes left, giving the Vikings a 31–24 win and a 3–1 preseason record.

== Regular season ==
=== Schedule ===
Based on the NFL's predetermined scheduling formula, the Vikings played every team in the NFC East and AFC East, the teams from the NFC South and NFC West that finished the same place in their division as the Vikings did last year (which were the division winners), as well as their usual NFC North division rivals. The schedule was announced on April 20, 2010: the season began with the Vikings taking on the New Orleans Saints in the NFL Kickoff Game on Thursday, September 9, while the bye week will come in Week 4. The season culminated with road games against the Philadelphia Eagles and the Detroit Lions.

Week	Date	Opponent	Result	Record	Venue	NFL.com recap
1	September 9	at New Orleans Saints	**L** 9–14	0–1	Louisiana Superdome	Recap
2	September 19	Miami Dolphins	**L** 10–14	0–2	Mall of America Field	Recap
3	September 26	**Detroit Lions**	**W** 24–10	1–2	Mall of America Field	Recap
4	Bye					
5	October 11	at New York Jets	**L** 20–29	1–3	New Meadowlands Stadium	Recap
6	October 17	Dallas Cowboys	**W** 24–21	2–3	Mall of America Field	Recap
7	October 24	at **Green Bay Packers**	**L** 24–28	2–4	Lambeau Field	Recap
8	October 31	at New England Patriots	**L** 18–28	2–5	Gillette Stadium	Recap
9	November 7	Arizona Cardinals	**W** 27–24 (OT)	3–5	Mall of America Field	Recap
10	November 14	at **Chicago Bears**	**L** 13–27	3–6	Soldier Field	Recap
11	November 21	**Green Bay Packers**	**L** 3–31	3–7	Mall of America Field	Recap
12	November 28	at Washington Redskins	**W** 17–13	4–7	FedExField	Recap
13	December 5	Buffalo Bills	**W** 38–14	5–7	Mall of America Field	Recap
14	December 13	New York Giants	**L** 3–21	5–8	Ford Field**	Recap
15	December 20	**Chicago Bears**	**L** 14–40	5–9	TCF Bank Stadium**	Recap
16	December 28	at Philadelphia Eagles	**W** 24–14	6–9	Lincoln Financial Field	Recap
17	January 2	at **Detroit Lions**	**L** 13–20	6–10	Ford Field	Recap

Notes:

- Intra-division opponents are in **bold** text.
- ** Orange indicates that the game was originally scheduled for Mall of America Field but was moved to the indicated location due to the collapse of the Metrodome roof. The Giants game was rescheduled from December 12 to December 13.
- The Vikings' road game against the Philadelphia Eagles was postponed from December 26 to December 28 due to inclement weather.

=== Game summaries ===
==== Week 1: at New Orleans Saints ====
Week 1: Minnesota Vikings at New Orleans Saints – Game summary

Quarter	1	2	3	4	Total
Vikings	0	9	0	0	**9**
**Saints**	7	0	7	0	**14**

at Louisiana Superdome, New Orleans, Louisiana

- Date: September 9
- Game time: 7:30 p.m.
- Game weather: None (indoor stadium)
- Game attendance: 70,051
- Referee: Terry McAulay (77)
- TV announcers (NBC): Al Michaels and Cris Collinsworth
- Recap, Game Book

Game information

**First quarter**

- NO – Devery Henderson 29-yard pass from Drew Brees (Garrett Hartley kick), 12:56. Saints 7–0. **Drive: 5 plays, 77 yards, 2:04.**

**Second quarter**

- MIN – Ryan Longwell 41-yard field goal, 5:28. Saints 7–3. **Drive: 16 plays, 66 yards, 9:25.**
- MIN – Visanthe Shiancoe 20-yard pass from Brett Favre (kick blocked), 0:34. Vikings 9–7. **Drive: 5 plays, 64 yards, 0:45.**

**Third quarter**

- NO – Pierre Thomas 1-yard run (Garrett Hartley kick), 6:13. Saints 14–9. **Drive: 11 plays, 74 yards, 6:43.**

**Fourth quarter**

- No scoring plays.

**Top passers**

- MIN – Brett Favre – 15/27, 171 yards, TD, INT
- NO – Drew Brees – 27/36, 237 yards, TD

**Top rushers**

- MIN – Adrian Peterson – 19 rushes, 87 yards
- NO – Pierre Thomas – 19 rushes, 71 yards, TD

**Top receivers**

- MIN – Visanthe Shiancoe – 4 receptions, 76 yards, TD
- NO – Marques Colston – 5 receptions, 62 yards

The Vikings began the 2010 NFL season by taking part in the annual NFL Kickoff Game against the defending Super Bowl champions, the New Orleans Saints, in a rematch of the previous season's NFC Championship Game. Minnesota lost the coin toss and gave up a touchdown on the first drive of the game; New Orleans received the ball from the kickoff and then took 5 plays to go 77 yards, culminating with Drew Brees passing 29 yards down the right sideline for wide receiver Devery Henderson, who dived into the endzone for the score. The 1st quarter ended with the Vikings defense forcing the Saints to go 3-and-out, with the subsequent punt beginning the 2nd quarter.

The Vikings began the next drive at their own 11-yard line, before taking 16 plays to go 66 yards and into field goal range. They failed to convert on 3rd down at the New Orleans 23-yard line, giving Ryan Longwell the chance to score a 41-yard field goal. Minnesota forced another 3-and-out on the Saints' next possession, but Bernard Berrian muffed the catch on the punt return, and the Vikings began their next drive at their own 18-yard line. To rub salt in the wound, on the 3rd play of the drive, Brett Favre was hit hard by Roman Harper and he threw a pass right into the hands of Saints linebacker Jonathan Vilma. With less than 90 seconds left in the half, Garrett Hartley stepped up for a 46-yard field goal attempt, but he hooked the kick wide left of the uprights. Beginning at the 36-yard line with 1:19 left in the half, Favre controlled the clock and picked up a 1st down before throwing consecutive 33-yard and 20-yard passes to tight end Visanthe Shiancoe for the Vikings' first touchdown of the season. Ryan Longwell's extra point attempt was blocked by defensive tackle Remi Ayodele, but the Vikings went in at the half with a 2-point lead.

After receiving the ball to start the second half, the Vikings were unable to get past midfield and gave the ball back to the Saints on the New Orleans 26-yard line. In the space of 10 plays, the Saints were up to the Minnesota 1-yard line, from where Pierre Thomas was able to jump over the line of scrimmage to restore New Orleans' lead. In the 4th quarter, the Saints had another shot at a field goal, this time from 32 yards, but again Hartley pulled the kick wide of the posts. New Orleans got the ball back with 5:32 left in the game, and ran out the clock to claim a 14–9 win.

==== Week 2: vs. Miami Dolphins ====
Week 2: Miami Dolphins at Minnesota Vikings – Game summary

Quarter	1	2	3	4	Total
**Dolphins**	7	0	7	0	**14**
Vikings	0	0	7	3	**10**

at Mall of America Field at Hubert H. Humphrey Metrodome, Minneapolis, Minnesota

- Date: September 19
- Game time: 12:00 p.m.
- Game weather: None (indoor stadium)
- Game attendance: 63,846
- Referee: Mike Carey (94)
- TV announcers (CBS): Greg Gumbel and Dan Dierdorf
- Recap, Game Book

Game information

**First quarter**

- MIA – Brian Hartline 5-yard pass from Chad Henne (Dan Carpenter kick), 4:40. Dolphins 7–0. **Drive: 9 plays, 73 yards, 4:47.**

**Second quarter**

- No scoring plays.

**Third quarter**

- MIA – Koa Misi fumble recovery in endzone (Dan Carpenter kick), 6:29. Dolphins 14–0.
- MIN – Adrian Peterson 1-yard run (Ryan Longwell kick), 2:38. Dolphins 14–7. **Drive: 2 plays, 1 yard, 0:10.**

**Fourth quarter**

- MIN – Ryan Longwell 28-yard field goal, 7:52. Dolphins 14–10. **Drive: 13 plays, 78 yards, 6:49.**

**Top passers**

- MIA – Chad Henne – 9/15, 114 yards, TD
- MIN – Brett Favre – 22/36, 225 yards, 3 INT

**Top rushers**

- MIA – Ronnie Brown – 13 rushes, 80 yards
- MIN – Adrian Peterson – 28 rushes, 145 yards, TD

**Top receivers**

- MIA – Brandon Marshall – 4 receptions, 71 yards
- MIN – Visanthe Shiancoe – 6 receptions, 86 yards

Week 2 saw the Vikings make their regular-season return to Mall of America Field with an interconference matchup against the Miami Dolphins, who they had not played since Week 11 of the 2006 season. Yet again, Minnesota conceded the first points of the game – on Miami's first offensive play of the game, Chad Henne threw a 46-yard pass to Brandon Marshall to get the Dolphins to the Minnesota 27-yard line; eight plays later, they had the ball in the endzone via a 5-yard pass from Henne to wide receiver Brian Hartline. The 2nd quarter saw Brett Favre throw his second interception of the season – his first of four turnovers during the game. The second came midway through the 3rd quarter when the 21-year veteran fumbled on a sack into his own endzone; the ball was recovered by Dolphins linebacker Koa Misi to give Miami a two-possession lead.

A Minnesota fightback began soon after, but not before Favre threw another interception, picked off by cornerback Jason Allen at the Miami 2-yard line. However, on Miami's first play after the turnover, running back Ricky Williams fumbled during a tackle by linebacker E. J. Henderson; Henderson's brother Erin recovered the ball and made his way to the 1-yard line, giving the Vikings a 1st-and-goal opportunity. Favre failed to pick out tight end Visanthe Shiancoe with the first play of the drive before allowing Adrian Peterson to barge through the line of scrimmage for the touchdown. A 13-play drive at the start of the 4th quarter got the Vikings into the Dolphins' redzone, but the Miami defense forced them to settle for a 28-yard field goal.

With just under six minutes left in the game, Minnesota defensive tackle Pat Williams forced another Miami fumble, recovered by E. J. Henderson 24 yards from the Miami endzone. A succession of rushing attempts from Adrian Peterson followed, getting the Vikings to within a yard of a go-ahead touchdown, but linebacker Karlos Dansby stopped him short of the line on 4th-and-goal. The Vikings had one more attempt to steal the win inside the final two minutes, but Favre's attempted pass to Shiancoe on 4th-and-6 from the Dolphins' 27 fell incomplete, allowing Henne to run the game out with a kneel down, and the Vikings suffered their first home loss in the regular season for the first time since 2008 against the Atlanta Falcons.

==== Week 3: vs. Detroit Lions ====
Week 3: Detroit Lions at Minnesota Vikings – Game summary

Quarter	1	2	3	4	Total
Lions	7	3	0	0	**10**
**Vikings**	7	7	10	0	**24**

at Mall of America Field at Hubert H. Humphrey Metrodome, Minneapolis, Minnesota

- Date: September 26
- Game time: 12:00 p.m.
- Game weather: None (indoor stadium)
- Game attendance: 63,377
- Referee: Ed Hochuli (85)
- TV announcers (Fox): Kenny Albert, Daryl Johnston and Tony Siragusa
- Recap, Game Book

Game information

**First quarter**

- DET – Tony Scheffler 5-yard pass from Shaun Hill (Jason Hanson kick), 3:04. Lions 7–0. **Drive: 3 plays, 12 yards, 1:13.**
- MIN – Percy Harvin 24-yard pass from Brett Favre (Ryan Longwell kick), 0:57. Tied 7–7. **Drive: 1 play, 24 yards, 0:05.**

**Second quarter**

- MIN – Adrian Peterson 6-yard run (Ryan Longwell kick), 4:44. Vikings 14–7. **Drive: 10 plays, 66 yards, 5:58.**
- DET – Jason Hanson 33-yard field goal, 0:00. Vikings 14–10. **Drive: 5 plays, 36 yards, 0:54.**

**Third quarter**

- MIN – Ryan Longwell 31-yard field goal, 7:47. Vikings 17–10. **Drive: 13 plays, 59 yards, 7:13.**
- MIN – Adrian Peterson 80-yard run (Ryan Longwell kick), 3:01. Vikings 24–10. **Drive: 1 play, 80 yards, 0:13.**

**Fourth quarter**

- No scoring plays.

**Top passers**

- DET – Shaun Hill – 29/43, 237 yards, TD, 2 INT
- MIN – Brett Favre – 23/34, 201 yards, TD, 2 INT

**Top rushers**

- DET – Jahvid Best – 7 rushes, 26 yards
- MIN – Adrian Peterson – 23 rushes, 160 yards, TD

**Top receivers**

- DET – Tony Scheffler – 7 receptions, 60 yards, TD
- MIN – Percy Harvin – 6 receptions, 62 yards, TD

The Vikings stayed at home for their Week 3 encounter with their divisional rivals, the Detroit Lions. Both teams went into the game with 0–2 records, hoping to move away from the bottom of the division standings. Deep into the 1st quarter, Vikings quarterback Brett Favre continued his interception-throwing form, as he was picked off by Lions defensive tackle Corey Williams while attempting to throw a short pass to running back Toby Gerhart. Williams set off on a run, but Gerhart recovered to bring him down at the Minnesota 12-yard line. Three short plays later, Detroit had the ball in the end zone, quarterback Shaun Hill finishing off the drive with a 5-yard pass to tight end Tony Scheffler. The Vikings were forced to punt the ball away on their first drive after the touchdown, but Detroit punt returner Stefan Logan fumbled while attempting to catch the ball, which was recovered by Vikings linebacker Chad Greenway 24 yards from the Detroit goal line. With the first play of the drive, Favre threw a 24-yard pass to wide receiver Percy Harvin, who made a diving catch for the game-tying touchdown. Detroit's next drive resulted in a missed field goal, allowing the Vikings to go 66 yards back down the field for a touchdown, finished off by a 6-yard run from Adrian Peterson. With a minute left in the first half, Favre was picked off yet again, as his throwing arm was hit by Lions defensive end Cliff Avril, giving Alphonso Smith a simple interception. The Lions drove 36 yards into the Minnesota half, and Jason Hanson ended the 2nd quarter with a field goal from 33 yards.

Minnesota began the second half with the ball and took 10 plays to get into the Detroit red zone; however, the Detroit defense stood firm and the Vikings were limited to a 31-yard field goal from Ryan Longwell. The Lions managed to get back into the Minnesota half on their next possession, but they went 3-and-out on the Minnesota 41-yard line before punting into the end zone for a touchback. On the very next play, Vikings halfback Adrian Peterson broke a career-long 80-yard run for a touchdown to put Minnesota 24–10 up. On Detroit's next possession, a sack on 3rd-and-20 by Vikings defensive end Brian Robison on quarterback Shaun Hill sparked a mass brawl between the two teams. As the defense made their way off the field, Brett Favre was seen giving them vigorous verbal encouragement. Midway through the 4th quarter, Minnesota running back Toby Gerhart fumbled the ball in a tackle, and it was recovered by Detroit free safety Louis Delmas. The Lions then drove back down the field from their own 22-yard line to within 4 yards of the Minnesota end zone in just under 5 minutes. However, on 1st-and-goal, Vikings linebacker Ben Leber intercepted Shaun Hill's attempted pass to running back Maurice Morris inside the end zone before returning it to the Minnesota 18-yard line. The Vikings failed in their attempt to run the clock down to the two-minute warning and had to punt the ball away, giving the Lions one final chance to reduce their deficit. Beginning the drive at their own 38-yard line, they got to the Minnesota 10-yard line within seven plays, but cornerback Antoine Winfield intercepted Hill's attempt at another touchdown pass to Tony Scheffler inside the endzone for a touchback with only a minute to go. Brett Favre knelt the ball down to run out the clock and the Vikings picked up their first win of the regular season.

==== Week 4: Bye week ====
The Vikings took their 2010 bye week in Week 4 of the season – their earliest bye week since the 2004 season. There were mixed results for their divisional rivals, with the Green Bay Packers beating the Detroit Lions by 2 points, while the Chicago Bears were beaten 17–3 by the New York Giants.

In the days leading to their Week 5 game, the Vikings pulled off a dramatic trade, acquiring receiver Randy Moss from the New England Patriots. The move reunited Moss with the team that drafted him in 1998 and came after Moss caught 50 touchdowns with New England, including a one-handed touchdown catch against the Jets four weeks earlier.

==== Week 5: at New York Jets ====
Week 5: Minnesota Vikings at New York Jets – Game summary

Quarter	1	2	3	4	Total
Vikings	0	0	7	13	**20**
**Jets**	3	6	6	14	**29**

at New Meadowlands Stadium, East Rutherford, New Jersey

- Date: October 11
- Game time: 8:15 p.m.
- Game weather: Cloudy, 72 °F (22 °C)
- Game attendance: 77,909
- Referee: Pete Morelli (135)
- TV announcers (ESPN): Mike Tirico, Ron Jaworski, Jon Gruden, Michele Tafoya and Suzy Kolber
- Recap, Game Book

Game information

**First quarter**

- NYJ – Nick Folk 25-yard field goal, 4:55. Jets 3–0. **Drive: 7 plays, 33 yards, 3:32.**

**Second quarter**

- NYJ – Nick Folk 53-yard field goal, 5:29. Jets 6–0. **Drive: 7 plays, 33 yards, 2:30.**
- NYJ – Nick Folk 22-yard field goal, 0:17. Jets 9–0. **Drive: 14 plays, 43 yards, 3:43.**

**Third quarter**

- NYJ – Nick Folk 34-yard field goal, 8:49. Jets 12–0. **Drive: 8 plays, 30 yards, 3:55.**
- MIN – Randy Moss 37-yard pass from Brett Favre (Ryan Longwell kick), 2:10. Jets 12–7. **Drive: 10 plays, 72 yards, 4:01.**
- NYJ – Nick Folk 31-yard field goal, 0:49. Jets 15–7. **Drive: 4 plays, 6 yards, 1:21.**

**Fourth quarter**

- MIN – Percy Harvin 34-yard pass from Brett Favre (pass failed), 12:47. Jets 15–13. **Drive: 5 plays, 65 yards, 3:02.**
- NYJ – Shonn Greene 23-yard run (Nick Folk kick), 4:30. Jets 22–13. **Drive: 6 plays, 66 yards, 2:36.**
- MIN – Percy Harvin 11-yard pass from Brett Favre (Ryan Longwell kick), 3:09. Jets 22–20. **Drive: 5 plays, 54 yards, 1:21.**
- NYJ – Dwight Lowery 26-yard interception return (Nick Folk kick), 1:30. Jets 29–20.

**Top passers**

- MIN – Brett Favre – 14/34, 264 yards, 3 TD, INT
- NYJ – Mark Sanchez – 21/44, 191 yards

**Top rushers**

- MIN – Adrian Peterson – 18 rushes, 88 yards
- NYJ – LaDainian Tomlinson – 20 rushes, 94 yards

**Top receivers**

- MIN – Percy Harvin – 5 receptions, 97 yards, 2 TD
- NYJ – Braylon Edwards – 5 receptions, 70 yards

Coming off their bye week, the Vikings flew to New Meadowlands Stadium for a Week 5 interconference duel with the New York Jets on Monday night. Minnesota trailed early in the first quarter as Jets kicker Nick Folk got a 25-yard field goal. The Vikings' deficit increased in the second quarter as Folk made a 53-yard and a 22-yard field goal.

Minnesota's frustrations continued in the third quarter as Folk got a 34-yard field goal. The Vikings would respond as quarterback Brett Favre threw his 500th career touchdown pass by finding wide receiver Randy Moss on a 37-yard touchdown pass, but New York answered with Folk's 31-yard field goal. After the delay at the end of the third quarter due to adverse weather conditions the Vikings would strike back in the fourth quarter as Favre found wide receiver Percy Harvin on a 34-yard touchdown pass (with a failed 2-point conversion), but the Jets replied with a 23-yard touchdown run from running back Shonn Greene. Minnesota tried to rally as Favre found Harvin again on an 11-yard touchdown pass, but New York would put the game away as cornerback Dwight Lowery returned an interception 26 yards for a touchdown.

==== Week 6: vs. Dallas Cowboys ====
Week 6: Dallas Cowboys at Minnesota Vikings – Game summary

Quarter	1	2	3	4	Total
Cowboys	7	7	0	7	**21**
**Vikings**	7	0	14	3	**24**

at Mall of America Field at Hubert H. Humphrey Metrodome, Minneapolis, Minnesota

- Date: October 17
- Game time: 3:15 p.m.
- Game weather: None (indoor stadium)
- Game attendance: 64,120
- Referee: Gene Steratore (114)
- TV announcers (Fox): Thom Brennaman, Troy Aikman and Pam Oliver
- Recap, Game Book

Game information

**First quarter**

- DAL – Roy Williams 15-yard pass from Tony Romo (David Buehler kick), 5:02. Cowboys 7–0. **Drive: 8 plays, 48 yards, 4:03.**
- MIN – Greg Camarillo 10-yard pass from Brett Favre (Ryan Longwell kick), 0:00. Tied 7–7. **Drive: 3 plays, 16 yards, 1:25.**

**Second quarter**

- DAL – Roy Williams 2-yard pass from Tony Romo (David Buehler kick), 0:29. Cowboys 14–7. **Drive: 13 plays, 82 yards, 7:05.**

**Third quarter**

- MIN – Percy Harvin 95-yard kickoff return (Ryan Longwell kick), 14:48. Tied 14–14. **Drive: 0 plays, 0 yards, 0:12.**
- MIN – Adrian Peterson 1-yard run (Ryan Longwell kick), 0:43. Vikings 21–14. **Drive: 9 plays, 49 yards, 5:19.**

**Fourth quarter**

- DAL – Dez Bryant 31-yard pass from Tony Romo (David Buehler kick), 10:18. Tied 21–21. **Drive: 10 plays, 65 yards, 5:25.**
- MIN – Ryan Longwell 38-yard field goal, 4:03. Vikings 24–21. **Drive: 7 plays, 10 yards, 3:30.**

**Top passers**

- DAL – Tony Romo – 24/32, 220 yards, 3 TD, 2 INT
- MIN – Brett Favre – 14/19, 118 yards, TD

**Top rushers**

- DAL – Felix Jones – 14 rushes, 32 yards
- MIN – Adrian Peterson – 24 rushes, 73 yards, TD

**Top receivers**

- DAL – Felix Jones – 10 receptions, 61 yards
- MIN – Randy Moss – 5 receptions, 55 yards

Hoping to rebound from their road loss to the Jets and save their season, the Vikings went home for a Week 6 duel with the Dallas Cowboys, in a rematch of last year's Divisional Playoff game, won 34–3 by the Vikings. Minnesota trailed in the first quarter as Cowboys quarterback Tony Romo completed a 15-yard touchdown pass to wide receiver Roy Williams. The Vikings answered with quarterback Brett Favre finding wide receiver Greg Camarillo on a 10-yard touchdown pass. Dallas struck back in the second quarter as Romo found Williams again on a 2-yard touchdown pass.

Minnesota took the lead in the third quarter as wide receiver Percy Harvin returned the half's opening kickoff 95 yards for a touchdown, followed by a 1-yard touchdown run from running back Adrian Peterson. The Cowboys tied the game in the fourth quarter as Romo threw a 31-yard touchdown pass to wide receiver Dez Bryant. Afterwards, the Vikings closed out the game as kicker Ryan Longwell booted a 38-yard field goal.

==== Week 7: at Green Bay Packers ====
Week 7: Minnesota Vikings at Green Bay Packers – Game summary

Quarter	1	2	3	4	Total
Vikings	7	10	7	0	**24**
**Packers**	7	7	14	0	**28**

at Lambeau Field, Green Bay, Wisconsin

- Date: October 24
- Game time: 7:20 p.m.
- Game weather: Cloudy, 58 °F (14 °C)
- Game attendance: 71,107
- Referee: Scott Green (19)
- TV announcers (NBC): Al Michaels, Cris Collinsworth and Andrea Kremer
- Recap, Game Book

Game information

**First quarter**

- GB – Brandon Jackson 1-yard run (Mason Crosby kick), 5:07. Packers 7–0. **Drive: 4 plays, 76 yards, 2:28.**
- MIN – Percy Harvin 17-yard run (Ryan Longwell kick), 1:11. Tied 7–7. **Drive: 7 plays, 44 yards, 3:56.**

**Second quarter**

- GB – Andrew Quarless 9-yard pass from Aaron Rodgers (Mason Crosby kick), 14:53. Packers 14–7. **Drive: 5 plays, 79 yards, 1:18.**
- MIN – Adrian Peterson 1-yard run (Ryan Longwell kick), 10:16. Tied 14–14. **Drive: 9 plays, 76 yards, 4:37.**
- MIN – Ryan Longwell 28-yard field goal, 3:59. Vikings 17–14. **Drive: 8 plays, 53 yards, 3:09.**

**Third quarter**

- GB – Greg Jennings 14-yard pass from Aaron Rodgers (Mason Crosby kick), 8:44. Packers 21–17. **Drive: 5 plays, 41 yards, 3:00.**
- GB – Desmond Bishop 32-yard interception return (Mason Crosby kick), 7:45. Packers 28–17.
- MIN – Randy Moss 4-yard pass from Brett Favre (Ryan Longwell kick), 4:12. Packers 28–24. **Drive: 6 plays, 58 yards, 3:33.**

**Fourth quarter**

- No scoring plays.

**Top passers**

- MIN – Brett Favre – 16/29, 212 yards, TD, 3 INT
- GB – Aaron Rodgers – 21/34, 295 yards, 2 TD, 2 INT

**Top rushers**

- MIN – Adrian Peterson – 28 rushes, 131 yards, TD
- GB – Brandon Jackson – 13 rushes, 58 yards, TD

**Top receivers**

- MIN – Percy Harvin – 5 receptions, 65 yards
- GB – James Jones – 4 receptions, 107 yards

Coming off their home win over the Cowboys, the Vikings flew to Lambeau Field for a Week 7 NFC North Sunday night duel with the Green Bay Packers, as quarterback Brett Favre made his return to take on his former team, in their first meeting on NBC's Sunday Night Football. Minnesota trailed early in the first quarter as Packers running back Brandon Jackson got a 1-yard touchdown run. Afterwards, the Vikings responded as wide receiver Percy Harvin got a 17-yard touchdown run. Green Bay struck back in the second quarter as quarterback Aaron Rodgers completed a 9-yard touchdown pass to tight end Andrew Quarless, yet Minnesota took the lead with running back Adrian Peterson getting a 1-yard touchdown run, followed by kicker Ryan Longwell booting a 28-yard field goal after a bizarre reversal of a touchdown reception by Visanthe Shiancoe.

The Packers began the third quarter with Rodgers completing a 14-yard touchdown pass to wide receiver Greg Jennings, followed by linebacker Desmond Bishop returning a Favre interception 32 yards for a touchdown. The Vikings would answer with Favre finding wide receiver Randy Moss on a 4-yard touchdown pass. Minnesota tried to rally in the fourth quarter with an apparent 30-yard touchdown pass from Favre to Harvin with 48 seconds left, which would have been the game winner, but Harvin had only one foot in bounds, nullifying the touchdown. Favre tried two more times to get into the end zone, but Green Bay's defense held for the win.

==== Week 8: at New England Patriots ====
Week 8: Minnesota Vikings at New England Patriots – Game summary

Quarter	1	2	3	4	Total
Vikings	0	7	3	8	**18**
**Patriots**	0	7	14	7	**28**

at Gillette Stadium, Foxborough, Massachusetts

- Date: October 31
- Game time: 3:15 p.m.
- Game weather: Partly cloudy, 49 °F (9 °C)
- Game attendance: 68,756
- Referee: Walt Anderson (66)
- TV announcers (Fox): Thom Brennaman, Troy Aikman and Pam Oliver
- Recap, Game Book

Game information

**First quarter**

- No scoring plays.

**Second quarter**

- MIN – Adrian Peterson 1-yard run (Ryan Longwell kick), 14:57. Vikings 7–0. **Drive: 12 plays, 76 yards, 6:09.**
- NE – Danny Woodhead 3-yard run (Stephen Gostkowski kick), 10:25. Tied 7–7. **Drive: 8 plays, 75 yards, 4:32.**

**Third quarter**

- MIN – Ryan Longwell 24-yard field goal, 9:33. Vikings 10–7. **Drive: 11 plays, 68 yards, 5:27.**
- NE – Brandon Tate 65-yard pass from Tom Brady (Stephen Gostkowski kick), 7:59. Patriots 14–10. **Drive: 4 plays, 80 yards, 1:34.**
- NE – BenJarvus Green-Ellis 13-yard run (Stephen Gostkowski kick), 2:25. Patriots 21–10. **Drive: 4 plays, 37 yards, 1:48.**

**Fourth quarter**

- MIN – Naufahu Tahi 1-yard pass from Tarvaris Jackson (Tarvaris Jackson–Percy Harvin pass), 7:26. Patriots 21–18. **Drive: 9 plays, 80 yards, 3:34.**
- NE – BenJarvus Green-Ellis 2-yard run (Stephen Gostkowski kick), 1:56. Patriots 28–18. **Drive: 13 plays, 80 yards, 5:30.**

**Top passers**

- MIN – Brett Favre – 22/32, 259 yards, INT
- NE – Tom Brady – 16/27, 240 yards, TD

**Top rushers**

- MIN – Adrian Peterson – 25 rushes, 92 yards, TD
- NE – BenJarvus Green-Ellis – 17 rushes, 112 yards, 2 TD

**Top receivers**

- MIN – Percy Harvin – 6 receptions, 104 yards
- NE – Brandon Tate – 3 receptions, 101 yards, TD

The Vikings made their first trip to Gillette Stadium since 2002 and the game marks the return of Randy Moss to Foxboro following an early-October trade from the New England Patriots.

In the second quarter, the Vikings took the lead after running back Adrian Peterson got a 1-yard touchdown run. The Patriots replied with running back Danny Woodhead getting a 3-yard touchdown run. The Vikings got the lead back in the third quarter with kicker Ryan Longwell nailing a 24-yard field goal. They fell behind with quarterback Tom Brady completing a 65-yard touchdown pass to wide receiver Brandon Tate, and when running back BenJarvus Green-Ellis made a 13-yard touchdown run. They tried to come back in the 4th quarter after quarterback Tarvaris Jackson completed a 1-yard touchdown pass to fullback Naufahu Tahi (with a successful 2-point conversion as Jackson passed to wide receiver Percy Harvin) but couldn't do anything after Green-Ellis got a 2-yard touchdown run.

==== Week 9: vs. Arizona Cardinals ====
Week 9: Arizona Cardinals at Minnesota Vikings – Game summary

Quarter	1	2	3	4	OT	Total
Cardinals	0	14	7	3	0	**24**
**Vikings**	0	10	0	14	3	**27**

at Mall of America Field at Hubert H. Humphrey Metrodome, Minneapolis, Minnesota

- Date: November 7
- Game time: 12:00 p.m.
- Game weather: None (indoor stadium)
- Game attendance: 64,120
- Referee: Bill Leavy (127)
- TV announcers (Fox): Kenny Albert, Daryl Johnston and Tony Siragusa
- Recap, Game Book

Game information

**First quarter**

- No scoring plays.

**Second quarter**

- MIN – Adrian Peterson 12-yard pass from Brett Favre (Ryan Longwell kick), 12:17. Vikings 7–0. **Drive: 5 plays, 52 yards, 2:43.**
- ARI – LaRod Stephens-Howling 96-yard kickoff return (Jay Feely kick), 12:04. Tied 7–7. **Drive: 0 plays, 0 yards, 0:13.**
- MIN – Ryan Longwell 21-yard field goal, 6:22. Vikings 10–7. **Drive: 11 plays, 61 yards, 5:42.**
- ARI – Andre Roberts 30-yard pass from Derek Anderson (Jay Feely kick), 0:29. Cardinals 14–10. **Drive: 7 plays, 81 yards, 1:01.**

**Third quarter**

- ARI – Michael Adams 30-yard fumble return (Jay Feely kick), 14:48. Cardinals 21–10.

**Fourth quarter**

- ARI – Jay Feely 22-yard field goal, 12:40. Cardinals 24–10. **Drive: 14 plays, 89 yards, 7:36.**
- MIN – Adrian Peterson 4-yard run (Ryan Longwell kick), 3:34. Cardinals 24–17. **Drive: 3 plays, 40 yards, 1:05.**
- MIN – Visanthe Shiancoe 25-yard pass from Brett Favre (Ryan Longwell kick), 0:27. Tied 24–24. **Drive: 5 plays, 77 yards, 1:57.**

**Overtime**

- MIN – Ryan Longwell 35-yard field goal, 9:42. Vikings 27–24. **Drive: 6 plays, 51 yards, 3:56.**

**Top passers**

- ARI – Derek Anderson – 15/26, 179 yards, TD
- MIN – Brett Favre – 36/47, 446 yards, 2 TD, 2 INT

**Top rushers**

- ARI – Tim Hightower – 13 rushes, 39 yards
- MIN – Adrian Peterson – 15 rushes, 81 yards, TD

**Top receivers**

- ARI – Larry Fitzgerald – 7 receptions, 107 yards
- MIN – Percy Harvin – 9 receptions, 126 yards

The Vikings came into Week 9 in desperation mode as they went against the 3–4 Cardinals, whom they lost the previous December in the desert. The Vikings came into the game wearing their purple pants and played the Cardinals in what was arguably a desperation game not only for the season, but head coach Brad Childress' job. His job had become more scrutinized after he acted alone to cut wide receiver Randy Moss, which drew a bunch of boos and jeers at Childress. However, the action did not start until the 2nd quarter, when the Vikings drove down the field and had a 2nd and goal. Favre threw to Peterson behind the line, but Peterson dodged a few players and got into the end zone, which made the game 7–0 in the 2nd quarter. The very next play, when the Vikings kicked off, Stephens-Howling returned a kickoff 96 yards for a touchdown which tied the game. After that, the Vikings responded with kicker Ryan Longwell nailing a 21-yard field goal. They fell behind with quarterback Derek Anderson completing a 30-yard touchdown pass to wide receiver Andre Roberts to close out the first half. This was followed by defensive back Michael Adams returning a Percy Harvin kickoff fumble 30 yards for a touchdown, and with kicker Jay Feely making a 22-yard field goal. The lead was closed down by Peterson as he got a 4-yard touchdown run, and by quarterback Brett Favre's 25-yard touchdown pass to tight end Visanthe Shiancoe. In overtime the decision was made when Longwell successfully made a 35-yard field goal to give the Vikings the win, bringing their record up to 3–5 and temporarily saving their quarterback's and head coach's jobs.

==== Week 10: at Chicago Bears ====
Week 10: Minnesota Vikings at Chicago Bears – Game summary

Quarter	1	2	3	4	Total
Vikings	3	7	3	0	**13**
**Bears**	0	14	6	7	**27**

at Soldier Field, Chicago, Illinois

- Date: November 14
- Game time: 12:00 p.m.
- Game weather: Partly cloudy, 44 °F (7 °C)
- Game attendance: 62,206
- Referee: Tony Corrente (99)
- TV announcers (Fox): Kenny Albert, Daryl Johnston and Tony Siragusa
- Recap, Game Book

Game information

**First quarter**

- MIN – Ryan Longwell 36-yard field goal, 3:30. Vikings 3–0. **Drive: 11 plays, 62 yards, 6:32.**

**Second quarter**

- CHI – Greg Olsen 17-yard pass from Jay Cutler (Robbie Gould kick), 6:57. Bears 7–3. **Drive: 11 plays, 71 yards, 5:13.**
- MIN – Percy Harvin 53-yard pass from Brett Favre (Ryan Longwell kick), 3:17. Vikings 10–7. **Drive: 1 plays, 53 yards, 0:09.**
- CHI – Devin Hester 19-yard pass from Jay Cutler (Robbie Gould kick), 0:44. Bears 14–10. **Drive: 8 plays, 49 yards, 2:33.**

**Third quarter**

- CHI – Robbie Gould 34-yard field goal, 13:12. Bears 17–10. **Drive: 4 plays, −6 yards, 0:59.**
- MIN – Ryan Longwell 33-yard field goal, 8:14. Bears 17–13. **Drive: 4 plays, 42 yards, 1:05.**
- CHI – Robbie Gould 37-yard field goal, 5:26. Bears 20–13. **Drive: 7 plays, 14 yards, 2:48.**

**Fourth quarter**

- CHI – Kellen Davis 19-yard pass from Jay Cutler (Robbie Gould kick), 8:37. Bears 27–13. **Drive: 8 plays, 55 yards, 4:31.**

**Top passers**

- MIN – Brett Favre – 18/31, 170 yards, TD, 3 INT
- CHI – Jay Cutler – 22/35, 237 yards, 3 TD, 2 INT

**Top rushers**

- MIN – Adrian Peterson – 17 rushes, 51 yards
- CHI – Matt Forté – 21 rushes, 69 yards

**Top receivers**

- MIN – Percy Harvin – 4 receptions, 64 yards, TD
- CHI – Johnny Knox – 5 receptions, 90 yards

Coming off their win over the Cardinals the Vikings flew to Soldier Field for an NFC North rivalry match against the Bears. In the first quarter the Vikings took the lead after kicker Ryan Longwell hit a 36-yard field goal. They fell behind in the second quarter when quarterback Jay Cutler threw a 17-yard touchdown pass to tight end Greg Olsen. They got the lead back after quarterback Brett Favre completed a 53-yard touchdown pass to wide receiver Percy Harvin. They trailed again when Cutler got a 19-yard touchdown pass to wide receiver Devin Hester. The Bears extended their lead in the third quarter after kicker Robbie Gould nailed a 34-yard field goal. The Vikings replied with Longwell making a 33-yard field goal, but fell further behind with Gould hitting a 37-yard field goal, and in the 4th quarter with Cutler making a 19-yard touchdown pass to tight end Kellen Davis.

==== Week 11: vs. Green Bay Packers ====
Week 11: Green Bay Packers at Minnesota Vikings – Game summary

Quarter	1	2	3	4	Total
**Packers**	0	17	7	7	**31**
Vikings	3	0	0	0	**3**

at Mall of America Field at Hubert H. Humphrey Metrodome, Minneapolis, Minnesota

- Date: November 21
- Game time: 12:00 p.m.
- Game weather: None (indoor stadium)
- Game attendance: 64,120
- Referee: Clete Blakeman (34)
- TV announcers (Fox): Joe Buck, Troy Aikman and Pam Oliver
- Recap, Game Book

Game information

**First quarter**

- MIN – Ryan Longwell 24-yard field goal, 6:06. Vikings 3–0. **Drive: 10 plays, 77 yards, 5:51.**

**Second quarter**

- GB – Mason Crosby 42-yard field goal, 9:44. Tied 3–3. **Drive: 7 plays, 54 yards, 2:36.**
- GB – Greg Jennings 11-yard pass from Aaron Rodgers (Mason Crosby kick), 5:14. Packers 10–3. **Drive: 8 plays, 80 yards, 3:29.**
- GB – James Jones 3-yard pass from Aaron Rodgers (Mason Crosby kick), 0:05. Packers 17–3. **Drive: 6 plays, 53 yards, 0:58.**

**Third quarter**

- GB – Greg Jennings 46-yard pass from Aaron Rodgers (Mason Crosby kick), 12:01. Packers 24–3. **Drive: 6 plays, 73 yards, 2:59.**

**Fourth quarter**

- GB – Greg Jennings 22-yard pass from Aaron Rodgers (Mason Crosby kick), 9:42. Packers 31–3. **Drive: 6 plays, 42 yards, 3:32.**

**Top passers**

- GB – Aaron Rodgers – 22/31, 301 yards, 4 TD
- MIN – Brett Favre – 17/38, 208 yards, INT

**Top rushers**

- GB – Dimitri Nance – 12 rushes, 37 yards
- MIN – Adrian Peterson – 14 rushes, 72 yards

**Top receivers**

- GB – Greg Jennings – 7 receptions, 152 yards, 3 TD
- MIN – Sidney Rice – 3 receptions, 56 yards

Hoping to rebound from their loss to the Bears the Vikings played on home ground for an NFC North rivalry match against the Packers. In the 1st quarter the Vikings took the lead as kicker Ryan Longwell hit a 24-yard field goal. They fell behind from the second quarter onwards as the Packers rallied with kicker Mason Crosby making a 42-yard field goal, followed by quarterback Aaron Rodgers completing an 11-yard touchdown pass to wide receiver Greg Jennings, followed by his 3-yard touchdown pass to wide receiver James Jones. In the second half Rodgers connected with Jennings again on a 46 and then a 22-yard touchdown pass in the fourth quarter to finish off the Vikings.

The following day Brad Childress was fired as head coach and Leslie Frazier was named interim head coach.

==== Week 12: at Washington Redskins ====
Week 12: Minnesota Vikings at Washington Redskins – Game summary

Quarter	1	2	3	4	Total
**Vikings**	7	0	10	0	**17**
Redskins	7	0	0	6	**13**

at FedExField, Landover, Maryland

- Date: November 28
- Game time: 12:00 p.m.
- Game weather: Sunny, 47 °F (8 °C)
- Game attendance: 83,602
- Referee: Ed Hochuli (85)
- TV announcers (Fox): Dick Stockton, Charles Davis and Charissa Thompson
- Recap, Game Book

Game information

**First quarter**

- WAS – Fred Davis 10-yard pass from Donovan McNabb (Graham Gano kick), 7:07. Redskins 7–0. **Drive: 13 plays, 83 yards, 7:53.**
- MIN – Adrian Peterson 5-yard run (Ryan Longwell kick), 3:21. Tied 7–7. **Drive: 7 plays, 71 yards, 3:46.**

**Second quarter**

- No scoring plays.

**Third quarter**

- MIN – Toby Gerhart 5-yard run (Ryan Longwell kick), 9:48. Vikings 14–7. **Drive: 9 plays, 74 yards, 5:12.**
- MIN – Ryan Longwell 31-yard field goal, 0:52. Vikings 17–7. **Drive: 4 plays, −4 yards, 1:07.**

**Fourth quarter**

- WAS – Graham Gano 40-yard field goal, 13:34. Vikings 17–10. **Drive: 4 plays, 7 yards, 2:18.**
- WAS – Graham Gano 42-yard field goal, 10:02. Vikings 17–13. **Drive: 5 plays, 46 yards, 1:43.**

**Top passers**

- MIN – Brett Favre – 15/23, 172 yards
- WAS – Donovan McNabb – 21/35, 211 yards, TD, INT

**Top rushers**

- MIN – Toby Gerhart – 22 rushes, 76 yards, TD
- WAS – James Davis – 6 rushes, 11 yards

**Top receivers**

- MIN – Visanthe Shiancoe – 3 receptions, 54 yards
- WAS – Anthony Armstrong – 2 receptions, 53 yards

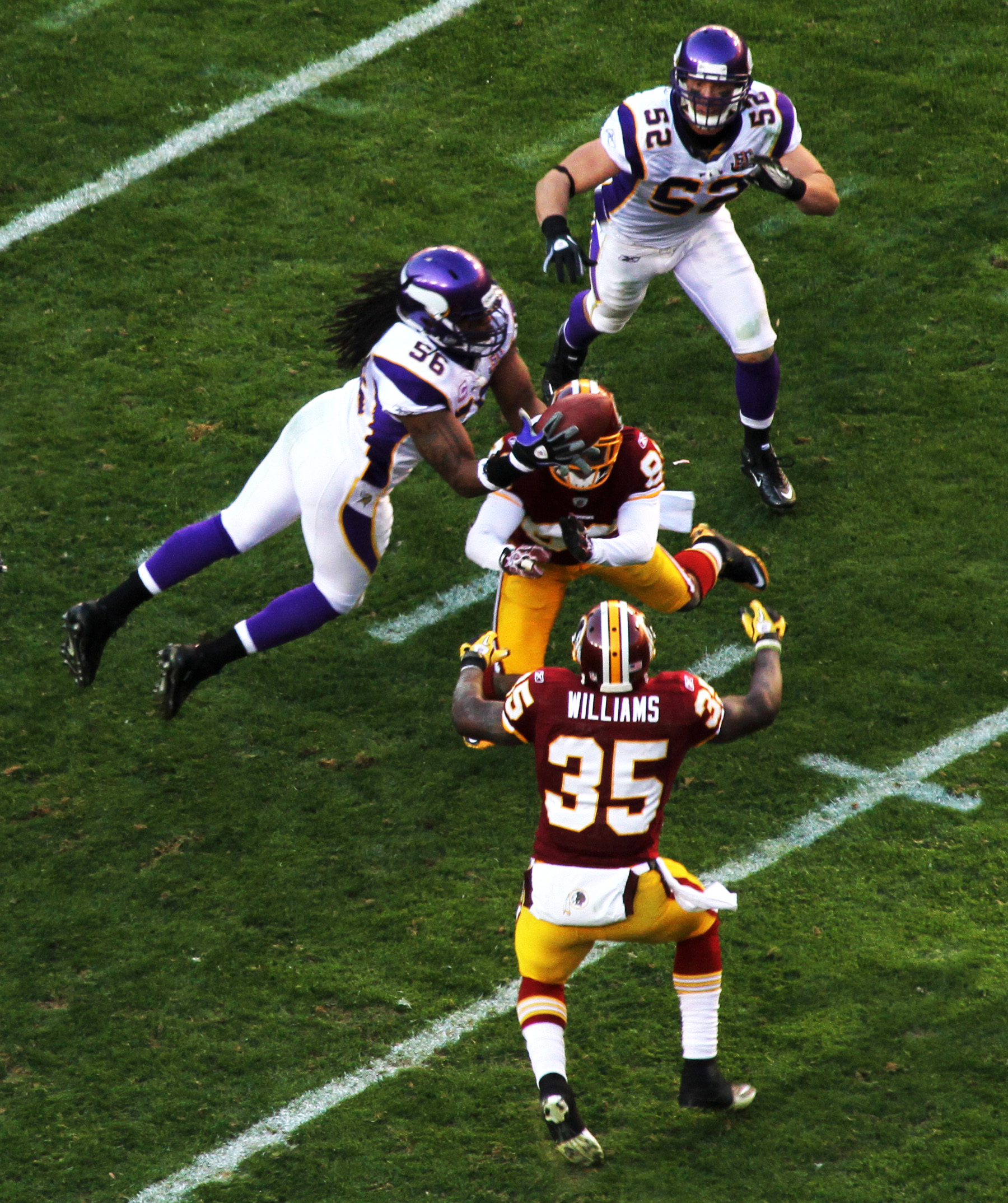
E.J. Henderson makes an interception against Washington, week 12

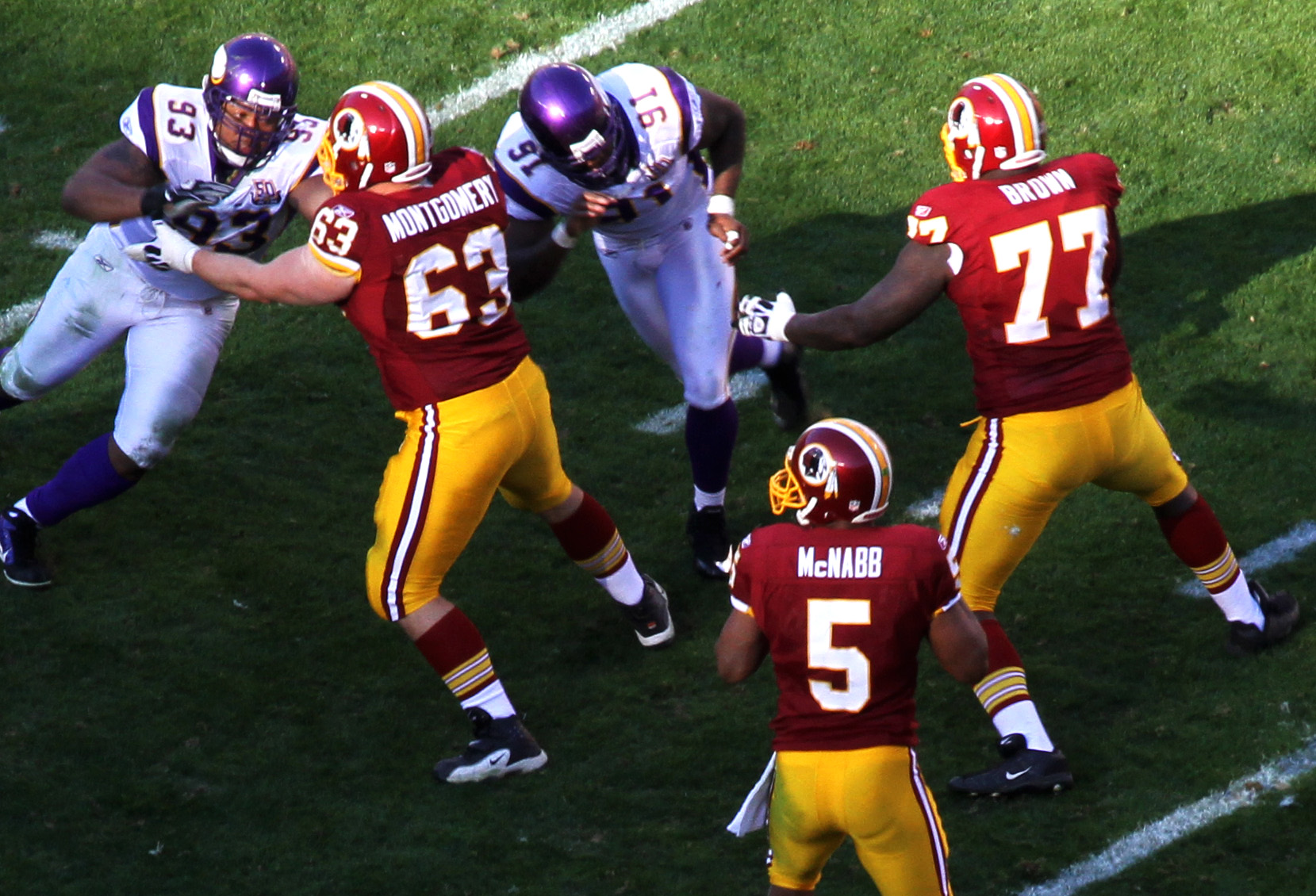
Minnesota on defense at the Washington Redskins in week 12, November 28

The Vikings' eleventh game was an NFC duel with the Redskins at FedExField. In the 1st quarter the Vikings trailed early as quarterback Donovan McNabb completed a 10-yard touchdown pass to tight end Fred Davis. They replied as running back Adrian Peterson got a 5-yard touchdown run. The Vikings pulled ahead with running back Toby Gerhart getting a 5-yard touchdown run, followed by kicker Ryan Longwell nailing a 31-yard field goal. The Redskins tried to come back, but only came away with 40-yard and a 42-yard field goals from kicker Graham Gano, giving the Vikings the win.

==== Week 13: vs. Buffalo Bills ====
Week 13: Buffalo Bills at Minnesota Vikings – Game summary

Quarter	1	2	3	4	Total
Bills	7	0	0	7	**14**
**Vikings**	7	24	0	7	**38**

at Mall of America Field at Hubert H. Humphrey Metrodome, Minneapolis, Minnesota

- Date: December 5
- Game time: 12:00 p.m.
- Game weather: None (indoor stadium)
- Game attendance: 64,012
- Referee: Jerome Boger (23)
- TV announcers (CBS): Kevin Harlan and Solomon Wilcots
- Recap, Game Book

Game information

**First quarter**

- BUF – Drayton Florence 40-yard interception return (Rian Lindell kick), 4:34. Bills 7–0.
- MIN – Sidney Rice 31-yard pass from Tarvaris Jackson (Ryan Longwell kick), 1:45. Tied 7–7. **Drive: 5 plays, 70 yards, 2:49.**

**Second quarter**

- MIN – Adrian Peterson 2-yard run (Ryan Longwell kick), 14:56. Vikings 14–7. **Drive: 4 plays, 14 yards, 1:41.**
- MIN – Adrian Peterson 3-yard run (Ryan Longwell kick), 11:00. Vikings 21–7. **Drive: 5 plays, 60 yards, 2:07.**
- MIN – Sidney Rice 6-yard pass from Tarvaris Jackson (Ryan Longwell kick), 8:00. Vikings 28–7. **Drive: 2 plays, 5 yards, 0:47.**
- MIN – Ryan Longwell 38-yard field goal, 0:00. Vikings 31–7. **Drive: 12 plays, 62 yards, 5:08.**

**Third quarter**

- No scoring plays.

**Fourth quarter**

- MIN – Adrian Peterson 43-yard run (Ryan Longwell kick), 14:46. Vikings 38–7. **Drive: 1 plays, 43 yards, 0:06.**
- BUF – David Nelson 12-yard pass from Ryan Fitzpatrick (Rian Lindell kick), 4:43. Vikings 38–14. **Drive: 5 plays, 43 yards, 1:02.**

**Top passers**

- BUF – Ryan Fitzpatrick – 15/25, 158 yards, TD, INT
- MIN – Tarvaris Jackson – 15/22, 187 yards, 2 TD, 3 INT

**Top rushers**

- BUF – Fred Jackson – 11 rushes, 42 yards
- MIN – Adrian Peterson – 16 rushes, 107 yards, 3 TD

**Top receivers**

- BUF – Lee Evans – 3 receptions, 72 yards
- MIN – Sidney Rice – 5 receptions, 105 yards, 2 TD

The Vikings' 12th game was an interconference duel with the Bills inside their dome and the first home game for interim head coach Leslie Frazier. On their first series, quarterback Brett Favre attempted a pass, but he was hit from behind and was intercepted by Bills cornerback Drayton Florence. Favre was slow to get up afterwards and he was able to walk off the field on his own power, but did not return to the game, citing a shoulder injury (later revealed to be a sprain in his throwing shoulder). At 297 consecutive starts over 19 seasons, this injury would put an end to Favre's all-time NFL consecutive start streak. In his place, backup quarterback Tarvaris Jackson took over for the rest of the game. They got off to a bad start after Jackson's pass was intercepted by cornerback Drayton Florence and returned 40 yards for a touchdown. They overcame this deficit with Jackson getting a 31-yard touchdown pass to wide receiver Sidney Rice. It was originally ruled an interception, but Frazier challenged the play and the officials sided with the Vikings, saying that Rice had two hands on the ball, resulting in a touchdown. It was followed in the second quarter by running back Adrian Peterson getting a 2-yard and a 3-yard touchdown run. Then Jackson found Rice again on a 6-yard touchdown pass, followed by kicker Ryan Longwell nailing a 38-yard field goal. They continued to dominate in the fourth quarter when Peterson ran 43 yards to the end zone for a touchdown. The Bills responded with quarterback Ryan Fitzpatrick getting a 12-yard touchdown pass to tight end David Nelson. However, the Bills were unable to overcome such a large deficit and couldn't come up with another come-from-behind victory.

==== Week 14: vs. New York Giants ====
Week 14: New York Giants at Minnesota Vikings – Game summary

Quarter	1	2	3	4	Total
**Giants**	0	14	7	0	**21**
Vikings	3	0	0	0	**3**

at Ford Field, Detroit, Michigan (moved from the Metrodome due to the roof collapse)

- Date: December 13 (rescheduled from December 12)
- Game time: 6:20 p.m.
- Game weather: None (indoor stadium)
- Game attendance: 45,910
- Referee: Jeff Triplette (42)
- TV announcers (Fox): Joe Buck, Troy Aikman and Pam Oliver
- Recap, Game Book

Game information

**First quarter**

- MIN – Ryan Longwell 21-yard field goal, 5:25. Vikings 3–0. **Drive: 10 plays, 31 yards, 4:35.**

**Second quarter**

- NYG – Brandon Jacobs 1-yard run (Lawrence Tynes kick), 8:11. Giants 7–3. **Drive: 6 plays, 89 yards, 3:45.**
- NYG – Kevin Boss 6-yard pass from Eli Manning (Lawrence Tynes kick), 0:03. Giants 14–3. **Drive: 9 plays, 71 yards, 1:40.**

**Third quarter**

- NYG – Ahmad Bradshaw 48-yard run (Lawrence Tynes kick), 2:46. Giants 21–3. **Drive: 3 plays, 59 yards, 1:00.**

**Fourth quarter**

- No scoring plays.

**Top passers**

- NYG – Eli Manning – 22/37, 187 yards, TD, 2 INT
- MIN – Tarvaris Jackson – 15/30, 118 yards, INT

**Top rushers**

- NYG – Brandon Jacobs – 14 rushes, 116 yards, TD
- MIN – Adrian Peterson – 14 rushes, 26 yards

**Top receivers**

- NYG – Hakeem Nicks – 7 receptions, 96 yards
- MIN – Sidney Rice – 5 receptions, 60 yards

Originally scheduled for 12:00 p.m. CST on Sunday, December 12, this game was moved to Monday night after severe blizzard conditions in the Minneapolis – Saint Paul area that forced the Giants to spend the night in Kansas City after their flight was diverted, while the operators of the Metrodome asked for more time to clear all the snow from the stadium's bubbled roof. The roof later collapsed, forcing the NFL to use Ford Field in Detroit as an alternate site. Despite the one-day delay, Brett Favre was listed as inactive for the game due to his shoulder injury. With the loss, the Vikings dropped to 5–8, and were mathematically eliminated from postseason contention.

==== Week 15: vs. Chicago Bears ====
Week 15: Chicago Bears at Minnesota Vikings – Game summary

Quarter	1	2	3	4	Total
**Bears**	10	7	20	3	**40**
Vikings	7	0	7	0	**14**

at TCF Bank Stadium, Minneapolis, Minnesota (moved from the Metrodome due to the roof collapse)

- Date: December 20
- Game time: 7:30 p.m.
- Game weather: Snow, 23 °F (−5 °C)
- Game attendance: 40,504
- Referee: Carl Cheffers (51)
- TV announcers (ESPN): Mike Tirico, Ron Jaworski, Jon Gruden, Michele Tafoya and Suzy Kolber
- Recap, Game Book

Game information

**First quarter**

- MIN – Percy Harvin 23-yard pass from Brett Favre (Ryan Longwell kick), 11:22. Vikings 7–0. **Drive: 6 plays, 60 yards, 3:38.**
- CHI – Robbie Gould 29-yard field goal, 5:18. Vikings 7–3. **Drive: 4 plays, 3 yards, 1:25.**
- CHI – Johnny Knox 67-yard pass from Jay Cutler (Robbie Gould kick), 1:55. Bears 10–7. **Drive: 1 play, 47 yards, 0:55.**

**Second quarter**

- CHI – Devin Hester 15-yard pass from Jay Cutler (Robbie Gould kick), 6:54. Bears 17–7. **Drive: 8 plays, 70 yards, 4:17.**

**Third quarter**

- CHI – Robbie Gould 23-yard field goal, 14:06. Bears 20–7. **Drive: 4 plays, 1 yard, 0:54.**
- CHI – Devin Hester 64-yard punt return (Robbie Gould kick), 12:06. Bears 27–7.
- MIN – Joe Webb 13-yard run (Ryan Longwell kick), 9:47. Bears 27–14. **Drive: 4 plays, 68 yards, 2:19.**
- CHI – Rashied Davis 9-yard pass from Jay Cutler (Robbie Gould kick), 5:16. Bears 34–14. **Drive: 7 plays, 53 yards, 4:31.**
- CHI – Robbie Gould 34-yard field goal, 0:38. Bears 37–14. **Drive: 7 plays, 29 yards, 3:39.**

**Fourth quarter**

- CHI – Robbie Gould 20-yard field goal, 7:03. Bears 40–14. **Drive: 7 plays, 30 yards, 3:26.**

**Top passers**

- CHI – Jay Cutler – 14/24, 194 yards, 3 TD, INT
- MIN – Joe Webb – 15/26, 129 yards, 2 INT

**Top rushers**

- CHI – Matt Forté – 17 rushes, 92 yards
- MIN – Toby Gerhart – 16 rushes, 77 yards

**Top receivers**

- CHI – Johnny Knox – 2 receptions, 78 yards, TD
- MIN – Percy Harvin – 5 receptions, 72 yards, TD

The Vikings' 14th game was a division rivalry rematch against the Bears at TCF Bank Stadium which was played on Monday Night. In the first quarter the Vikings took the lead with quarterback Brett Favre throwing a 23-yard touchdown pass to wide receiver Percy Harvin. However, they failed to maintain this lead after kickier Robbie Gould made a 29-yard field goal, followed by quarterback Jay Cutler completing a 67 and a 15-yard touchdown pass to wide receivers Johnny Knox and Devin Hester respectively, then with Gould nailing a 23-yard field goal. The Vikings caused more problems after a three-and-out converted into a 64-yard punt return for a touchdown by Hester. They tried to break the lead with quarterback Joe Webb scrambling 13 yards for a touchdown, but they continued to struggle after Cutler got a 9-yard touchdown pass to wide receiver Rashied Davis, followed by Gould hitting a 34 and a 20-yard field goal. The loss dropped the Vikings to 5–9, securing them their first losing season since 2006.

==== Week 16: at Philadelphia Eagles ====
Week 16: Minnesota Vikings at Philadelphia Eagles – Game summary

Quarter	1	2	3	4	Total
**Vikings**	0	7	10	7	**24**
Eagles	7	0	0	7	**14**

at Lincoln Financial Field, Philadelphia, Pennsylvania

- Date: December 28 (rescheduled from December 26)
- Game time: 7:00 p.m.
- Game weather: Partly cloudy, 32 °F (0 °C)
- Game attendance: 69,144
- Referee: Mike Carey (94)
- TV announcers (NBC): Al Michaels, Cris Collinsworth and Andrea Kremer
- Recap, Game Book

Game information

**First quarter**

- PHI – Clay Harbor 3-yard pass from Michael Vick (David Akers kick), 7:42. Eagles 7–0. **Drive: 7 plays, 50 yards, 3:34.**

**Second quarter**

- MIN – Antoine Winfield 45-yard fumble return (Ryan Longwell kick), 0:44. Tied 7–7.

**Third quarter**

- MIN – Ryan Longwell 30-yard field goal, 12:24. Vikings 10–7. **Drive: 7 plays, 62 yards, 2:36.**
- MIN – Joe Webb 9-yard run (Ryan Longwell kick), 7:03. Vikings 17–7. **Drive: 7 plays, 75 yards, 3:41.**

**Fourth quarter**

- PHI – Michael Vick 10-yard run (David Akers kick), 10:17. Vikings 17–14. **Drive: 12 plays, 53 yards, 4:57.**
- MIN – Adrian Peterson 1-yard run (Ryan Longwell kick), 6:43. Vikings 24–14. **Drive: 8 plays, 60 yards, 3:34.**

**Top passers**

- MIN – Joe Webb – 17/26, 195 yards
- PHI – Michael Vick – 25/43, 263 yards, TD, INT

**Top rushers**

- MIN – Adrian Peterson – 22 rushes, 118 yards, TD
- PHI – Michael Vick – 8 rushes, 63 yards, TD

**Top receivers**

- MIN – Percy Harvin – 7 receptions, 100 yards
- PHI – Brent Celek – 10 receptions, 97 yards

The December 2010 North American blizzard postponed the game until Tuesday, December 28, 2010, at 8:00 p.m. The NFL postponed the game shortly after noon, even before there was any snow accumulation in Philadelphia, after Philadelphia Mayor Michael Nutter declared a snow emergency for the city. This was the 20th NFL game to be played on a Tuesday, and the first since 1946. This was also the first Tuesday game in Vikings franchise history.

Trying to snap a two-game losing streak, the Vikings flew to Lincoln Financial Field for a Week 16 intraconference duel with the Philadelphia Eagles on Tuesday night. Minnesota trailed in the first quarter as Eagles quarterback Michael Vick completed a 3-yard touchdown pass to tight end Clay Harbor. The Vikings answered in the second quarter with cornerback Antoine Winfield returning a fumble 45 yards for a touchdown.

Minnesota took the lead in the third quarter with a 30-yard field goal from kicker Ryan Longwell, followed by a 9-yard touchdown run from rookie quarterback Joe Webb. Philadelphia struck back with Vick getting a 10-yard touchdown run which cut the lead to a field goal, but the Vikings came right back with a 1-yard touchdown run from running back Adrian Peterson.

==== Week 17: at Detroit Lions ====
Week 17: Minnesota Vikings at Detroit Lions – Game summary

Quarter	1	2	3	4	Total
Vikings	0	0	7	6	**13**
**Lions**	0	10	3	7	**20**

at Ford Field, Detroit, Michigan

- Date: January 2
- Game time: 12:00 p.m.
- Game weather: None (indoor stadium)
- Game attendance: 57,013
- Referee: Walt Anderson (66)
- TV announcers (Fox): Ron Pitts and John Lynch
- Recap, Game Book

Game information

**First quarter**

- No scoring plays.

**Second quarter**

- DET – Dave Rayner 55-yard field goal, 6:45. Lions 3–0. **Drive: 8 plays, 32 yards, 4:18.**
- DET – Nate Burleson 7-yard pass from Shaun Hill (Dave Rayner kick), 0:23. Lions 10–0. **Drive: 15 plays, 94 yards, 4:39.**

**Third quarter**

- DET – Dave Rayner 37-yard field goal, 9:58. Lions 13–0. **Drive: 11 plays, 47 yards, 5:02.**
- MIN – Jared Allen 36-yard interception return (Ryan Longwell kick), 6:03. Lions 13–7.

**Fourth quarter**

- MIN – Ryan Longwell 27-yard field goal, 12:05. Lions 13–10. **Drive: 12 plays, 52 yards, 7:17.**
- DET – Maurice Morris 5-yard run (Dave Rayner kick), 9:29. Lions 20–10. **Drive: 8 plays, 77 yards, 2:36.**
- MIN – Ryan Longwell 48-yard field goal, 1:55. Lions 20–13. **Drive: 13 plays, 58 yards, 3:41.**

**Top passers**

- MIN – Joe Webb – 20/32, 148 yards, INT
- DET – Shaun Hill – 28/39, 258 yards, TD, INT

**Top rushers**

- MIN – Joe Webb – 5 rushes, 35 yards
- DET – Jahvid Best – 10 rushes, 34 yards

**Top receivers**

- MIN – Percy Harvin – 8 receptions, 72 yards
- DET – Nate Burleson – 6 receptions, 83 yards, TD

The Vikings' final game was a division rivalry rematch against the Lions. In the second quarter the Vikings trailed early as kicker Dave Rayner nailed a 55-yard field goal, followed by quarterback Shaun Hill completing a 7-yard touchdown pass to wide receiver Nate Burleson, followed by Rayner making a 37-yard field goal. The Vikings got on the board too as an interception was returned 36 yards for a touchdown by defensive end Jared Allen. This was followed by kicker Ryan Longwell hitting a 27-yard field goal. Detroit extended their lead with running back Maurice Morris getting a 5-yard touchdown run. The Vikings tried to come back, but only came away with a 48-yard field goal from Longwell, giving the Vikings a loss and thus closing out the season on a 6–10 record.

=== Standings ===
NFC North
	W	L	T	PCT	DIV	CONF	PF	PA	STK
^{(2)} Chicago Bears	11	5	0	.688	5–1	8–4	334	286	L1
^{(6)} Green Bay Packers	10	6	0	.625	4–2	8–4	388	240	W2
Detroit Lions	6	10	0	.375	2–4	5–7	362	369	W4
Minnesota Vikings	6	10	0	.375	1–5	5–7	281	348	L1

== Statistics ==
=== Team leaders ===
Category	Player(s)	Value
Passing yards	Brett Favre	2,509
Passing touchdowns	Brett Favre	11
Rushing yards	Adrian Peterson	1,298
Rushing touchdowns	Adrian Peterson	12
Receiving yards	Percy Harvin	868
Receiving touchdowns	Percy Harvin	5
Points	Ryan Longwell	81
Kickoff return yards	Percy Harvin	933
Punt return yards	Greg Camarillo	359
Tackles	Chad Greenway	144
Sacks	Jared Allen	11.0
Interceptions	Husain Abdullah; E. J. Henderson	3
Forced fumbles	Ben Leber; Antoine Winfield	2

=== League rankings ===
Category	Total yards	Yards per game	NFL rank (out of 32)
Passing offense	3,097	193.6	26th
Rushing offense	1,942	121.4	10th
Total offense	5,038	314.9	23rd
Passing defense	3,367	210.4	10th
Rushing defense	1,635	102.2	9th
Total defense	5,002	312.6	8th

== Pro Bowl ==
After Minnesota's disappointing season, only one Vikings player was selected to play in the 2011 Pro Bowl: RB Adrian Peterson. He missed out on the NFC's starting lineup to the Atlanta Falcons' Michael Turner, and was joined on the bench by the St. Louis Rams' Steven Jackson. Peterson received the most fan votes out of all running backs in the NFL (948,410), and the sixth most out of all players, behind five quarterbacks.

After the Detroit Lions' rookie defensive tackle Ndamukong Suh went for surgery on an injured shoulder, Kevin Williams was called up as an alternate. However, due to the imminent arrival of a new baby to him and his wife, Williams himself withdrew from the roster on January 22; he was replaced by the Arizona Cardinals' DT Darnell Dockett. Two days later, CB Antoine Winfield was added to the NFC Pro Bowl roster to replace the Green Bay Packers' Charles Woodson and Tramon Williams, both of whom withdrew due to their participation in Super Bowl XLV. The final Viking to be added to the NFC roster was LB E. J. Henderson, who received his first career Pro Bowl selection. Coming in as injury cover for San Francisco's Patrick Willis and Chicago's Brian Urlacher, Henderson travelled to Hawaii, but did not take the field.
