= Sidney Rice =

American football player (born 1986)

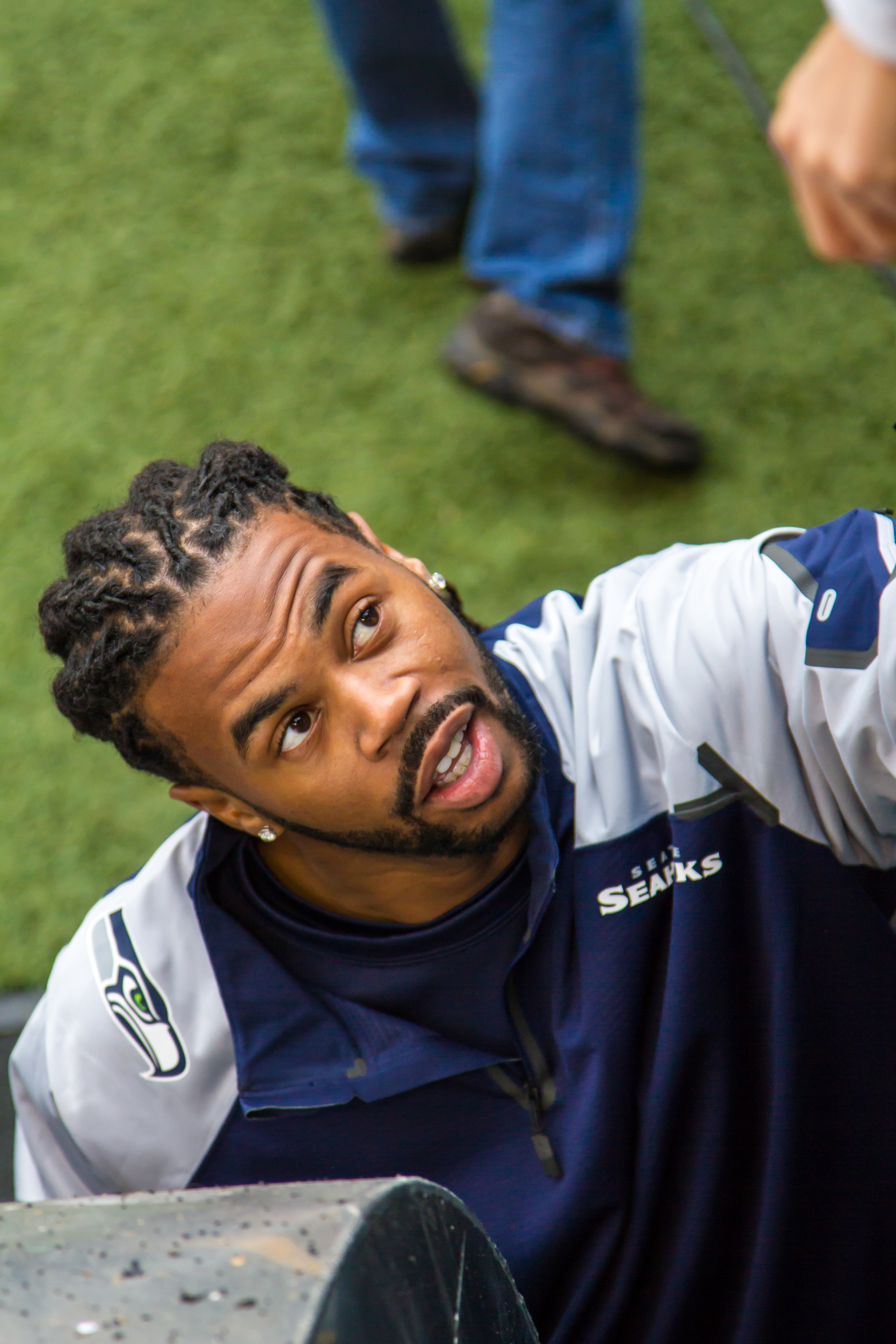
- Rice with the Seattle Seahawks in 2013

No. 18
- Position: Wide receiver

Personal information
- Born: September 1, 1986 (age 40); Gaffney, South Carolina, U.S.
- Listed height: 6 ft 4 in (1.93 m)
- Listed weight: 202 lb (92 kg)

Career information
- High school: Gaffney
- College: South Carolina (2004–2006)
- NFL draft: 2007: 2nd round, 44th overall pick

Career history
- Minnesota Vikings (2007–2010); Seattle Seahawks (2011–2013)

Awards and highlights
- Super Bowl champion (XLVIII); Pro Bowl (2009); PFWA All-Rookie Team (2007); First-team All-SEC (2005); Second-team All-SEC (2006)

Career NFL statistics
- Receptions: 243
- Receiving yards: 3,592
- Receiving touchdowns: 30
- Stats at Pro Football Reference

Sidney Raynard Rice (born September 1, 1986) is an American former professional football player who was a wide receiver for seven seasons in the National Football League (NFL). Rice played college football for the South Carolina Gamecocks. He was selected by the Minnesota Vikings in the second round of the 2007 NFL draft.

He also played for the Seattle Seahawks, with whom he became a champion in Super Bowl XLVIII.

== Early life ==
Rice was born to Ida Coleman in Pickens, South Carolina. Rice has two older brothers, Jarvis Rice and Tremell Austin. Rice grew up in Gaffney, where he played both football and basketball for the Gaffney High School Indians. Rice, who graduated from Gaffney High School in 2004 was named All-State in both sports, leading the basketball team to consecutive state titles and the football team to a state championship as well. He had 38 catches for 735 yards and 11 touchdowns his junior campaign. He was named to the High School Sports Report Statewide All-State team and selected Offensive Player of the Year. In 2003, Rice caught 77 passes for 1,414 yards and 14 touchdowns as a senior. Rice ended his high school career with 167 receptions for 3,044 yards and 31 touchdowns. In addition, Rice excelled in basketball, earning 2002 – 2003 Class 4A Basketball Player of the Year after helping Gaffney to the state championship. That season, he averaged 18 points and seven rebounds per game, as the Indians finished the basketball season with an undefeated 28–0 record.

== College career ==
Rice was heavily recruited by many colleges but signed with the University of South Carolina, where he played for the South Carolina Gamecocks football team from 2004 to 2006.

Rice was redshirted in his freshman year in 2004.

In his redshirt freshman year in 2005, Rice had six games going over the 100-yard mark and three with multiple touchdowns. In the Independence Bowl against Missouri, he had 12 receptions for 191 receiving yards and a touchdown in the 38–31 loss. Overall, Rice had 70 catches for 1,143 yards and 13 touchdowns. He began his career with eight consecutive games with a touchdown, a school record. He led the SEC in receiving yards and receiving touchdowns. This streak ended with the 30–22 upset of the nationally ranked Florida Gators at Williams-Brice Stadium.

In 2006, Rice had five games going over the 100-yard mark and two with multiple receiving touchdowns. Overall, Rice caught 72 passes for 1,090 yards and 10 touchdowns. He had five touchdowns against Florida Atlantic which broke a South Carolina record and tied an SEC record for most receiving touchdowns in a game. For his short career, he broke Sterling Sharpe's school career touchdown record in just two years with the program, finishing his career with 23 touchdowns.

== Professional career ==
Pre-draft measurables
Height	Weight	Arm length	Hand span	40-yard dash	10-yard split	20-yard split	20-yard shuttle	Three-cone drill	Vertical jump	Broad jump
6 ft 3 1/2 in (1.92 m)	200 lb (91 kg)	33 1/2 in (0.85 m)	9 3/4 in (0.25 m)	4.53 s	1.58 s	2.64 s	4.34 s	7.09 s	39.5 in (1.00 m)	9 ft 11 in (3.02 m)
All values from NFL Combine

=== Minnesota Vikings ===
==== 2007–2008 ====
Rice was selected in the second round with the 44th overall pick of the 2007 NFL draft by the Minnesota Vikings. He signed a four-year contract with the Vikings in 2007.

Rice caught his first touchdown pass on September 30, 2007, playing against the Green Bay Packers. In Week 15, against the Chicago Bears, Rice injured his knee, causing him to miss the final two games. Rice finished his rookie season with 31 receptions for 396 yards and four touchdowns. He completed two passes including a 79-yard pass, the longest for a non-quarterback in Vikings history.

The next season, Rice was named a starter with the Vikings new wide receiver acquisition Bernard Berrian. He scored a 23-yard touchdown in Week 1 against the Green Bay Packers. However, Rice suffered a knee injury that kept him out until Week 9. When he returned, most of his playing time was when the Vikings were in the red zone as he would lose his starting job to Bobby Wade. Rice finished the 2008 season with 15 catches for 141 yards and four touchdowns.

==== 2009 Pro Bowl season ====
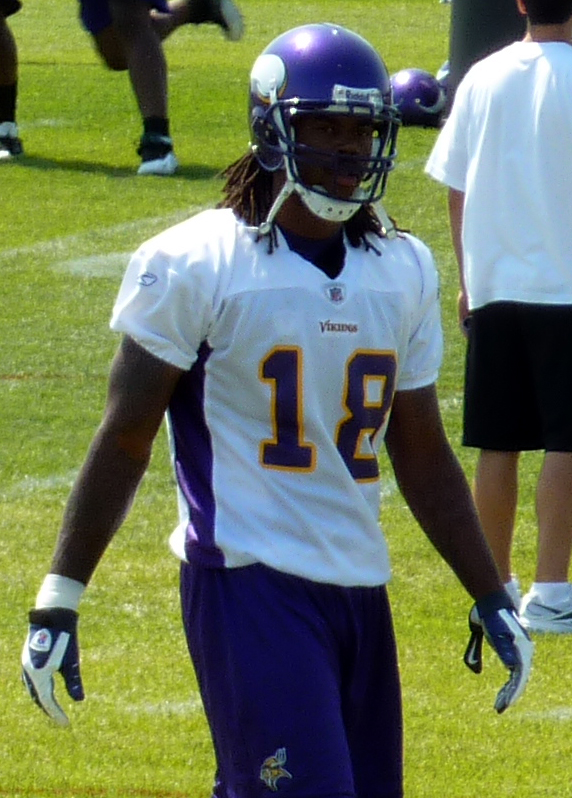
Rice at Vikings training camp in 2009

In 2009, Rice had the most successful and stellar season of his career. Rice won his starting job back, and showed chemistry with new quarterback Brett Favre. In a game against the Baltimore Ravens, he finished with six catches for 176 yards. The next week against Pittsburgh, Rice had a career-high 10 catches for 136 yards. In Week 10 against the Detroit Lions, Rice had a seven-catch, 201-yard performance. On November 18, 2009, Rice was named the NFC Offensive Player of the Week, the first time he received that award. Also, during the same year, he was selected to his first Pro Bowl. In Week 17 of the 2009 NFL season, Rice caught six receptions for 112 yards, along with two touchdowns. This helped to complete a 44–7 rout of the New York Giants and help the Vikings to a 12–4 regular season record. This was enough for them to secure the #2 seed in the NFC playoffs.

Coming off a bye week in the first round of the playoffs, Rice and the Vikings played host to the NFC East champions Dallas Cowboys in the NFC Divisional Round of the playoffs at the Metrodome. Rice played exceptionally well against the Cowboys, catching six passes from Brett Favre for 141 yards and three touchdowns.

==== Hip surgery and 2010 season ====
Rice suffered a hip injury in the previous season's NFC Championship against the Saints. He was supposed to have surgery in the off-season during the spring to repair it. He did not go through with it during the off-season, fearing its effect on his performance. On Monday, August 23, 2010, three weeks into the next season's training camp, he decided to go through with the surgery and was unable to play with the Vikings until November. Rice underwent a "pick" procedure similar to microfracture knee surgery to repair joint cartilage damage. Doctors poked holes in the hip bone, making it bleed to generate cells that would reconstitute themselves as replacement fibrocartilage to fill the damaged gap. To compensate, the Vikings signed free agent wide receiver Javon Walker, whom Brett Favre played with in Green Bay, as well as trade for wide receiver Greg Camarillo, formerly of the Miami Dolphins. The Vikings traded for wide receiver Randy Moss from New England, whom they released after four games. Sidney Rice was activated from the physically unable to perform (PUP) list. He made his 2010 season debut on November 21 against the Green Bay Packers in the Metrodome with three catches for 56 yards. Rice went on to have a role in the Vikings' late-season victory over the Buffalo Bills, with 105 receiving yards and two touchdowns, and before sustaining a concussion during Philadelphia Eagles game. This left him unable to play in the season finale, a loss against the Detroit Lions. He finished the 2010 season with 17 receptions for 280 receiving yards and two receiving touchdowns in six games.

=== Seattle Seahawks ===
==== 2011 season ====
After the lifting of the NFL lockout, Rice agreed to terms on a five-year, $41 million contract with the Seattle Seahawks. The contract guaranteed Rice $18.5 million over its duration. He was reunited in Seattle with offensive coordinator Darrell Bevell and quarterback Tarvaris Jackson, a member of the Vikings during Rice's tenure there.

Rice was placed on injured reserve on November 30, 2011. In the 2011 season, Rice finished with 32 receptions for 484 receiving yards and two receiving touchdowns in nine games. He had two games going over the 100-yard mark on the season.

==== 2012 season ====
On October 14, 2012, in Week 6, Rice caught the game-winning touchdown from a 46-yard pass from rookie quarterback Russell Wilson to beat the New England Patriots by a score of 24–23. In Week 10, against the New York Jets, he had two receiving touchdowns in the 28–7 victory. On December 2, in Week 13, Rice caught the game-winning touchdown from Russell Wilson in overtime, as the Seahawks edged past the Chicago Bears 23–17 at Soldier Field; he caught six passes for 99 yards and the one touchdown, keeping the Seahawks in contention for a wild-card berth with a 7–5 record. Rice finished the 2012 season with 50 receptions for 748 receiving yards and seven receiving touchdowns.

==== 2013 season ====
In Week 3, against the Jacksonville Jaguars, Rice had two receiving touchdowns in the 45–17 victory. In a Week 8 game against the St. Louis Rams, Rice tore his ACL, rendering him out for the remainder of the season. Rice finished the 2013 season with 15 receptions for 231 receiving yards and three receiving touchdowns in eight games. Without Rice, the Seahawks would win Super Bowl XLVIII after defeating the Denver Broncos by a score of 43–8.

In February 2014, the Seahawks released Rice. He agreed to re-sign with Seahawks on a one-year contract on April 16, 2014.

==== Retirement ====
On July 23, 2014, Rice announced his retirement from professional football due to multiple concussions throughout his career.

== NFL career statistics ==
Legend
	Won the Super Bowl
**Bold**	Career high

=== Regular season ===
Year	Team	GP	Receiving							Fumbles	
Year	Team	GP	Rec	Tgt	Yds	Avg	Lng	TD	FD	Fum	Lost
2007	MIN	13	31	53	396	12.8	60	4	25	0	0
2008	MIN	13	15	31	141	9.4	23	4	12	0	0
2009	MIN	16	83	122	1,312	15.8	63	8	59	1	1
2010	MIN	6	17	43	280	16.5	46	2	14	0	0
2011	SEA	9	32	57	484	15.1	52	2	19	0	0
2012	SEA	16	50	80	748	15.0	46	7	37	0	0
2013	SEA	8	15	35	231	15.4	31	3	11	1	1
Career		81	243	421	3,592	14.8	63	30	177	2	2
