= Alric Arnett =

American football player (born 1987)

Profile
- Position: Wide receiver

Personal information
- Born: June 26, 1987 (age 39); Belle Glade, Florida, United States
- Listed height: 6 ft 2 in (1.88 m)
- Listed weight: 190 lb (86 kg)

Career information
- High school: Belle Glades (FL) Central
- College: West Virginia
- NFL draft: 2010: undrafted

Career history
- Denver Broncos (2010)*; Indianapolis Colts (2010)*; Detroit Lions (2010)*; Orlando Predators (2012); Calgary Stampeders (2013)
- * Offseason or practice squad member only

Career CFL statistics
- Receptions: 1
- Receiving yards: 4
- Stats at CFL.ca (archived)

Career AFL statistics
- Tackles: 1
- Stats at ArenaFan.com

Alric Arnett (born June 26, 1987) is an American former football wide receiver who played in the Arena Football League and Canadian Football League. He played for the Orlando Predators and Calgary Stampeders. He played college football for the West Virginia Mountaineers.
