= Ryan D'Imperio =

American football player (born 1987)

No. 44
- Position: Fullback

Personal information
- Born: August 15, 1987 (age 39); Sewell, New Jersey, U.S.
- Listed height: 6 ft 2 in (1.88 m)
- Listed weight: 241 lb (109 kg)

Career information
- High school: Washington Township (NJ)
- College: Rutgers
- NFL draft: 2010: 7th round, 237th overall pick

Career history
- Minnesota Vikings (2010−2011); Kansas City Chiefs (2012)*; New York Giants (2013)*
- * Offseason or practice squad member only
- Stats at Pro Football Reference

Ryan D'Imperio (born August 15, 1987) is an American former professional football player who was a fullback in the National Football League (NFL). He was selected by the Minnesota Vikings in the seventh round of the 2010 NFL draft. He played college football for the Rutgers Scarlet Knights. He finished his career playing 12 NFL games with two receptions and seven total yards gained.

== College career ==
After receiving a high school degree while attending at Washington Township High School in Sewell, New Jersey, D’Imperio came to Rutgers and made an instant impact at linebacker. The true freshman appeared in all 13 games as the Scarlet Knights enjoyed an 11–2 season in 2006 and won their first bowl championship. Throughout his college career, D'Imperio recorded 177 total tackles, 6 quarterback sacks, and 2 interceptions, including one returned for a touchdown. After his junior year, D'Imperio was voted to the Second Team All-Big East.

== Professional career ==
=== Minnesota Vikings ===
D'Imperio was selected as a linebacker 237th overall in the 2010 NFL draft by the Minnesota Vikings. D'Imperio chose to wear the number 44, the same number he wore in both high school and college. Rather than play linebacker, Viking's coach Brad Childress, thought D'Imperio would be better suited playing fullback on the offensive side of the ball. He spent the 2010 season on the Vikings practice squad. On September 3, 2011, D'Imperio was waived by the Vikings during final cuts before the start of the 2011 NFL season and added to the practice squad. On October 4, 2011, D'Imperio was promoted to the active roster.

On August 31, 2012, D'Imperio was released during final roster cutdowns due to an injured shoulder.

=== Kansas City Chiefs ===
D'Imperio signed with the Kansas City Chiefs on March 21, 2013. D'Imperio was released from the Kansas City Chiefs on May 13, 2013

=== New York Giants ===
On July 26, 2013, D'Imperio signed with the New York Giants. On August 13, 2013, the Giants announced that he had retired.
