= Greg Camarillo =

American football player (born 1982)

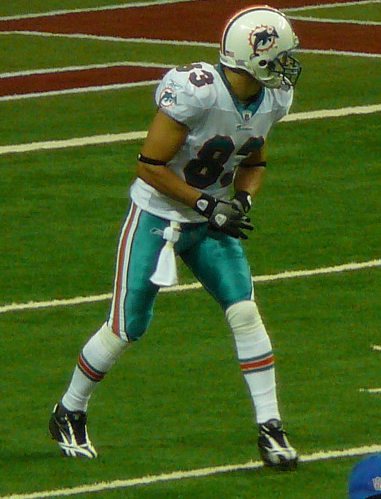
- Camarillo with the Miami Dolphins in 2009

No. 83, 85, 17
- Position: Wide receiver

Personal information
- Born: April 18, 1982 (age 44); Redwood City, California, U.S.
- Listed height: 6 ft 1 in (1.85 m)
- Listed weight: 195 lb (88 kg)

Career information
- High school: Menlo-Atherton (Atherton, California)
- College: Stanford
- NFL draft: 2005: undrafted

Career history
- San Diego Chargers (2005–2006); Miami Dolphins (2007–2009); Minnesota Vikings (2010–2011); New Orleans Saints (2012)

Career NFL statistics
- Games played: 80
- Receptions: 146
- Receiving yards: 1,730
- Receiving touchdowns: 5
- Stats at Pro Football Reference

Greg Camarillo (/kæməˈriːoʊ/ kam-ə-REE-oh; born April 18, 1982) is an American former professional football player who was a wide receiver in the National Football League (NFL). He played college football for the Stanford Cardinal and was signed by the San Diego Chargers as an undrafted free agent in 2005.

Camarillo also played for the Miami Dolphins. He is most notable for his game-winning 64-yard touchdown reception from Cleo Lemon against the Baltimore Ravens on December 16, 2007. The play won the Dolphins the game 22–16 in overtime and was the team's first win after thirteen consecutive losses to begin the year. It was also the only game the Dolphins won the entire season and allowed them to narrowly avoid becoming the first 0–16 team in NFL history (which was later achieved by the Detroit Lions in the 2008 season).

== Early life ==
Camarillo is Jewish. His mother is also Jewish, and her family immigrated to the U.S. from Hungary. His father was born in California, and is a professor of Mexican-American history and culture at Stanford. His Catholic paternal grandfather immigrated to the U.S. from Mexico. Camarillo was raised Jewish and celebrating both Christmas and Chanukah.

Camarillo attended Menlo-Atherton High School in Atherton, California, where he was a letterman in football and basketball. In football, he was a four-year letterman and as a senior, he was a first-team All-Peninsula Athletic League honoree and an All-San Mateo County selection. In basketball, he was a second-team All-Peninsula Athletic League selection.

== College career ==
He turned down Harvard and chose Stanford, where he walked on as a punter, red-shirted his first year in 2000 and later played wide receiver for four seasons, totaling 45 receptions for 599 yards, and played on special teams for the Cardinals. He earned Academic All-Pac-10 honors for three years, graduating with a degree in product design engineering.

As a junior, Camarillo caught 18 passes for 225 yards (a 12.5 per-catch average), and posted similar but slightly better statistics as a senior (18 catches for 280 yards and a 15.6 per-catch average).

== Professional career ==
=== San Diego Chargers ===
Camarillo was signed as an undrafted free agent by the San Diego Chargers in 2005.

=== Miami Dolphins ===
On September 2, 2007, the Miami Dolphins claimed Camarillo off waivers. On December 16, Camarillo caught a 64-yard touchdown pass from Cleo Lemon in overtime against the Baltimore Ravens, clinching the Dolphins' first and only win of the 2007 NFL season. It was the longest offensive play for the Dolphins in 2007. Camarillo had a career-high 109 receiving yards and one touchdown. This was Camarillo's first touchdown since high school, since he failed to score during his four seasons at Stanford. In the following week, a 28–7 loss to the New England Patriots, Camarillo recorded his second professional touchdown when he scored on a 21-yard pass reception.

Camarillo's third pro touchdown came on October 5, 2008, on a 17-yard second-quarter pass from Chad Pennington, in a 17–10 victory over the San Diego Chargers.

On November 20, 2008, Camarillo signed a three-year, $6 million contract extension. Three days later, he caught what would be his fourth and final touchdown of the season, as later on he suffered a torn ACL against the New England Patriots and was subsequently placed on season-ending injured reserve.

In the 2009 NFL season, Camarillo did not drop a single pass thrown to him, earning him a reputation as a safe pair of hands in a pinch.

=== Minnesota Vikings ===
On August 25, 2010, the Miami Dolphins traded Camarillo to the Minnesota Vikings for cornerback Benny Sapp due to the Vikings' injury problems at wide receiver. He became a free agent after not being re-signed at the start of the 2012 offseason.

=== New Orleans Saints ===
The New Orleans Saints signed Camarillo on August 19, 2012. He was released as part of the final roster cuts before the start of the regular season. Camarillo was re-signed by the Saints on September 11, following injuries to the team's receiving corps during the first game of the regular season. His contract with the Saints was terminated on October 20, to make room for linebacker Jonathan Vilma who was activated off of the PUP list.

== See also ==
- List of select Jewish football players
