= 2018 Minnesota Vikings season =

NFL team season

- Owner: Zygi Wilf
- General manager: Rick Spielman
- Head coach: Mike Zimmer
- Home stadium: U.S. Bank Stadium

Results
- Record: 8–7–1
- Division place: 2nd NFC North
- Playoffs: Did not qualify
- All-Pros: 2: DE Danielle Hunter (2nd team); S Harrison Smith (2nd team)
- Pro Bowlers: 4: OLB Anthony Barr; DE Danielle Hunter; S Harrison Smith; WR Adam Thielen

Uniform
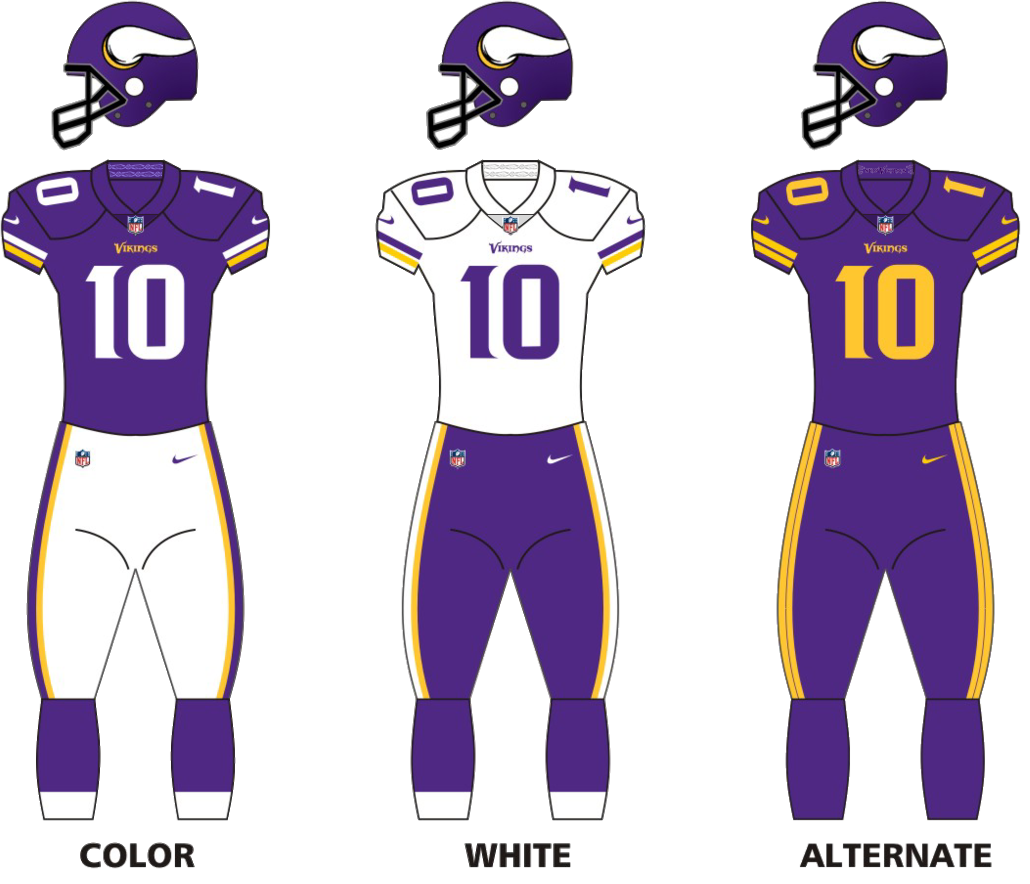

The 2018 season was the Minnesota Vikings' 58th in the National Football League (NFL), their third playing their home games at U.S. Bank Stadium and their fifth under head coach Mike Zimmer.

Following a Week 8 loss to the New Orleans Saints, the team could no longer improve on their 13–3 record from the 2017 season, in which they won the NFC North division and reached the NFC Championship before losing to the eventual Super Bowl LII champion Philadelphia Eagles. The Vikings failed to qualify for the playoffs for the second time in three years when they lost to the division rival Chicago Bears coupled with the Philadelphia Eagles defeating the Washington Redskins in the final week of the regular season.

== Roster changes ==
=== 2018 draft ===
2018 Minnesota Vikings draft selections
Round	Selection	Player name	Position	College	Notes
1	30	Mike Hughes	CB	UCF	
2	62	Brian O'Neill	OT	Pittsburgh	
3	94	Traded to the Tampa Bay Buccaneers (Note: The Vikings traded a third-round selection (94th overall) to the Tampa Bay Buccaneers in exchange for fourth- and sixth-round selections (102nd and 180th overall).)			
4	102	Jalyn Holmes	DE	Ohio State	From Buccaneers
4	130	Traded to the Philadelphia Eagles (Note: The Vikings traded a fourth-round selection (130th overall) and a 2017 first-round selection to the Philadelphia Eagles in exchange for QB Sam Bradford.)			
5	157	Tyler Conklin	TE	Central Michigan	From Jets (Note: The Vikings traded fifth- and seventh-round selections (167th and 225th overall) to the New York Jets in exchange for a fifth-round selection (157th overall).)
5	167	Daniel Carlson	K	Auburn	From Vikings via Jets (Note: The Vikings traded two sixth-round selections (180th and 204th overall) to the New York Jets in exchange for fifth- and seventh-round selections (167th and 204th overall).)
6	180	Traded to the New York Jets			From Buccaneers
6	204	Traded to the New York Jets			
6	213	Colby Gossett	G	Appalachian State	Compensatory pick (Note: The Vikings were awarded two sixth-round compensatory picks (213th and 218th overall).)
6	218	Ade Aruna	DE	Tulane	Compensatory pick
7	225	Devante Downs	LB	California	From Broncos (Note: The Vikings traded a 2019 fifth-round selection to the Denver Broncos in exchange for a seventh-round selection (225th overall) and QB Trevor Siemian.) via Vikings and Jets
7	248	Traded to the Seattle Seahawks (Note: The Vikings traded a seventh-round selection (248th overall) to the Seattle Seahawks in exchange for CB Tramaine Brock.)			

2018 Minnesota Vikings undrafted free agents
Name	Position	College
Jeff Badet	WR	Oklahoma
Mike Boone	RB	Cincinnati
Curtis Cothran	DT	Penn State
Garret Dooley	LB	Wisconsin
Armanti Foreman	WR	Texas
Chris Gonzalez	G	San José State
Holton Hill	CB	Texas
Tyler Hoppes	TE	Nebraska
Hercules Mata'afa	DE	Washington State
Trevon Mathis	CB	Toledo
Tray Matthews	DB	Auburn
Kamryn Pettway	RB	Auburn
Peter Pujals	QB	Holy Cross
Korey Robertson	WR	Southern Miss
Roc Thomas	RB	Jacksonville State
Jake Wieneke	WR	South Dakota State
Jonathan Wynn	LB	Vanderbilt

Notes

- The Vikings were awarded two compensatory selections at the NFL's annual spring owners' meetings. They received two additional selections in the sixth round, compensating for the losses of Cordarrelle Patterson and Adrian Peterson.

Draft trades

=== Transactions ===
Re-signings
Date	Player name	Position	Contract terms
March 12	Mack Brown	RB	1 year / $630,000
March 12	Anthony Harris	SS	1 year / $705,000
March 16	Dylan Bradley	DT	1 year / $480,000
March 20	Kai Forbath	K	1 year / $790,000
March 28	Marcus Sherels	CB	1 year / $1.4 million
April 30	Terence Newman	CB	1 year / $1.105 million

Departures
Date	Player name	Position	Note	New team
March 14	Sam Bradford	QB	UFA	Arizona Cardinals
March 14	Tramaine Brock	CB	UFA	Denver Broncos
March 14	Case Keenum	QB	UFA	Denver Broncos
March 14	Jerick McKinnon	RB	UFA	San Francisco 49ers
March 16	Jarius Wright	WR	Released	Carolina Panthers
March 18	Teddy Bridgewater	QB	UFA	New York Jets
March 21	Shaan Washington	LB	Waived	
March 21	Emmanuel Lamur	OLB	UFA	Oakland Raiders
March 22	Joe Berger	G	Retired	
March 23	Tom Johnson	DT	UFA	Seattle Seahawks
March 23	Jeremiah Sirles	G	UFA	Carolina Panthers
March 24	Shamar Stephen	DT	UFA	Seattle Seahawks

Additions
Date	Player name	Position	Previous team	Contract terms
February 12	Josh Andrews	G	Philadelphia Eagles	
March 15	Kirk Cousins	QB	Washington Redskins	3 years / $84 million
March 16	Sheldon Richardson	DT	Seattle Seahawks	1 year / $8 million
March 19	Trevor Siemian	QB	Denver Broncos	Trade
March 20	Josiah Price	TE	Minnesota Vikings	
March 20	Nick Dooley	LS		
March 22	Tom Compton	G	Chicago Bears	1 year / $900,000
March 29	Reshard Cliett	LB	Kansas City Chiefs	
March 30	Kendall Wright	WR	Chicago Bears	1 year / $1 million
April 5	Tavarres King	WR	New York Giants	
August 22	George Iloka	S	Cincinnati Bengals	1 year / $790,000

== Staff ==
2018 Minnesota Vikings staff
Front office: Owner/chairman – Zygi Wilf; Owner/president – Mark Wilf; Owner/vice chairman – Leonard Wilf; General manager – Rick Spielman; Assistant general manager – George Paton; Executive vice president – public affairs – Lester Bagley; Executive vice president – football operations – Rob Brzezinski; Executive vice president – strategic planning and business initiatives – Jonathan Wilf; Executive vice president/chief marketing officer – Steve LaCroix; Executive vice president/chief financial officer – Steve Poppen; Chief operating officer – Kevin Warren; Project executive – Don Becker; Consultant – Bud Grant; Head coaches: Head coach – Mike Zimmer; Offensive coaches: Interim offensive coordinator/quarterbacks – Kevin Stefanski; Assistant quarterbacks – Drew Petzing; Running backs – Kennedy Polamalu; Wide receivers – Darrell Hazell; Tight ends – Todd Downing; Co-offensive line – Clancy Barone; Co-offensive line – Andrew Janocko	Defensive coaches: Defensive coordinator – George Edwards; Defensive line – Andre Patterson; Assistant defensive line – Robert Rodriguez; Linebackers – Adam Zimmer; Defensive backs – Jerry Gray; Nickel/defensive backs – Terence Newman; Defensive assistant/assistant defensive backs – Jeff Howard; Defensive quality control coach – Nick Rallis; Special teams coaches: Special teams coordinator – Mike Priefer; Assistant special teams – Ryan Ficken; Strength and conditioning: Head strength and conditioning – Mark Uyeyama; Assistant strength and conditioning – Derik Keyes; Assistant strength and conditioning –Reshard Langford; Assistant strength and conditioning – Chaz Mahle

== Roster ==
2018 Minnesota Vikings roster
Quarterbacks (QB): 8 Kirk Cousins; 3 Trevor Siemian; 1 Kyle Sloter; Running backs (RB): 31 Ameer Abdullah; 44 Mike Boone; 33 Dalvin Cook; 30 C. J. Ham FB; 25 Latavius Murray; Wide receivers (WR): 12 Chad Beebe; 14 Stefon Diggs; 17 Aldrick Robinson; 19 Adam Thielen; 11 Laquon Treadwell; 15 Brandon Zylstra; Tight ends (TE): 83 Tyler Conklin; 89 David Morgan; 82 Kyle Rudolph	Offensive linemen (OL): 79 Tom Compton G; 65 Pat Elflein C; 69 Rashod Hill T; 63 Danny Isidora G; 61 Brett Jones C; 75 Brian O'Neill T; 71 Riley Reiff T; 74 Mike Remmers G; Defensive linemen (DL): 90 Tashawn Bower DE; 97 Everson Griffen DE; 92 Jalyn Holmes DE; 99 Danielle Hunter DE; 94 Jaleel Johnson DT; 96 Tom Johnson DT; 98 Linval Joseph DT; 93 Sheldon Richardson DT; 91 Stephen Weatherly DE	Linebackers (LB): 55 Anthony Barr OLB; 40 Kentrell Brothers MLB; 57 Devante Downs OLB; 42 Ben Gedeon OLB; 54 Eric Kendricks MLB; 50 Eric Wilson; Defensive backs (DB): 20 Mackensie Alexander CB; 41 Anthony Harris SS; 24 Holton Hill CB; 23 George Iloka SS; 36 Craig James CB; 27 Jayron Kearse FS; 29 Xavier Rhodes CB; 35 Marcus Sherels CB; 22 Harrison Smith FS; 26 Trae Waynes CB; Special teams (ST): 5 Dan Bailey K; 47 Kevin McDermott LS; 6 Matt Wile P	Practice squad: 85 Jeff Badet WR; 78 Adam Bisnowaty T; 43 Reshard Cliett OLB; 66 Curtis Cothran DT; 67 Cornelius Edison C; 87 Cole Hikutini TE; 37 Jalen Myrick CB; 72 Storm Norton T; 95 Ifeadi Odenigbo DE; 32 Roc Thomas RB; Reserve: 61 Ade Aruna DE (IR); 76 Aviante Collins T (IR); 62 Nick Easton G (IR); 21 Mike Hughes CB (IR); 68 Cedrick Lang T (IR); 51 Hercules Mata'afa DE (IR); 87 Josiah Price TE (IR); 34 Andrew Sendejo SS (IR); 48 Johnny Stanton FB (IR); Rookies in italics 53 active, 9 reserve, 10 practice squad

== Preseason ==
The Vikings' preliminary preseason schedule was announced on April 11.

Week	Date	Opponent	Result	Record	Venue	Attendance	NFL.com recap
1	August 11	at Denver Broncos	W 42–28	1–0	Broncos Stadium at Mile High	75,530	Recap
2	August 18	Jacksonville Jaguars	L 10–14	1–1	U.S. Bank Stadium	66,637	Recap
3	August 24	Seattle Seahawks	W 21–20	2–1	U.S. Bank Stadium	66,676	Recap
4	August 30	at Tennessee Titans	W 13–3	3–1	Nissan Stadium	61,455	Recap

=== Game summaries ===
==== Week 1: at Denver Broncos ====
Week 1: Minnesota Vikings at Denver Broncos – Game summary

Quarter	1	2	3	4	Total
Vikings	14	10	3	15	42
Broncos	0	14	7	7	28

at Broncos Stadium at Mile High, Denver, Colorado

- Date: August 11
- Game time: 8:00 p.m. CDT/7:00 p.m. MDT
- Game weather: Clear, 90 °F (32 °C)
- Game attendance: 75,530
- Referee: Pete Morelli (135)
- TV: KMSP
- Recap, Game Book

Game information

First quarter

- MIN – Stefon Diggs 1-yard pass from Kirk Cousins (Daniel Carlson kick), 8:15. Vikings 7–0. Drive: 8 plays, 75 yards, 5:14.
- MIN – Roc Thomas 13-yard pass from Trevor Siemian (Daniel Carlson kick), 1:36. Vikings 14–0. Drive: 3 plays, 23 yards, 1:14.

Second quarter

- MIN – Daniel Carlson 39-yard field goal, 9:47. Vikings 17–0. Drive: 11 plays, 55 yards, 5:20.
- DEN – Royce Freeman 23-yard run (Brandon McManus kick), 5:47. Vikings 17–7. Drive: 3 plays, 30 yards, 0:51.
- MIN – Roc Thomas 78-yard pass from Trevor Siemian (Daniel Carlson kick), 4:59. Vikings 24–7. Drive: 2 plays, 81 yards, 0:48.
- DEN – Isaiah McKenzie 78-yard punt return (Brandon McManus kick), 1:39. Vikings 24–14.

Third quarter

- MIN – Daniel Carlson 57-yard field goal, 5:50. Vikings 27–14. Drive: 7 plays, 21 yards, 3:43.
- DEN – Matt LaCosse 36-yard pass from Chad Kelly (Brandon McManus kick), 3:26. Vikings 27–21. Drive: 5 plays, 75 yards, 2:24.

Fourth quarter

- DEN – Phillip Lindsay 19-yard pass from Chad Kelly (Brandon McManus kick), 10:00. Broncos 28–27. Drive: 11 plays, 85 yards, 4:43.
- MIN – Chad Beebe 9-yard pass from Kyle Sloter (Kyle Sloter–Jeff Badet pass), 6:01. Vikings 35–28. Drive: 7 plays, 75 yards, 3:59.
- MIN – Kyle Sloter 14-yard run (Daniel Carlson kick), 3:06. Vikings 42–28. Drive: 6 plays, 30 yards, 2:17.

Top passers

- MIN – Trevor Siemian – 11/17, 165 yards, 2 TD, INT
- DEN – Chad Kelly – 14/21, 177 yards, 2 TD, INT

Top rushers

- MIN – Latavius Murray – 4 rushes, 43 yards
- DEN – Royce Freeman – 4 rushes, 38 yards, TD

Top receivers

- MIN – Roc Thomas – 3 receptions, 102 yards, 2 TD
- DEN – Matt LaCosse – 2 receptions, 40 yards, TD

==== Week 2: vs. Jacksonville Jaguars ====
Week 2: Jacksonville Jaguars at Minnesota Vikings – Game summary

Quarter	1	2	3	4	Total
Jaguars	0	7	0	7	14
Vikings	3	0	7	0	10

at U.S. Bank Stadium, Minneapolis, Minnesota

- Date: August 18
- Game time: 12:00 p.m. CDT
- Game weather: None (indoor stadium)
- Game attendance: 66,637
- Referee: Shawn Hochuli (83)
- TV: KMSP
- Recap, Game Book

Game information

First quarter

- MIN – Kai Forbath 44-yard field goal, 7:18. Vikings 3–0. Drive: 9 plays, 30 yards, 4:33.

Second quarter

- JAX – Leonard Fournette 1-yard run (Josh Lambo kick), 14:57. Jaguars 7–3. Drive: 12 plays, 70 yards, 6:25.

Third quarter

- MIN – Mike Boone 1-yard run (Daniel Carlson kick), 4:23. Vikings 10–7. Drive: 6 plays, 74 yards, 3:33.

Fourth quarter

- JAX – Brandon Wilds 1-yard run (Josh Lambo kick), 1:55. Jaguars 14–10. Drive: 2 plays, 4 yards, 0:08.

Top passers

- JAX – Blake Bortles – 12/20, 159 yards, INT
- MIN – Kyle Sloter – 10/15, 82 yards

Top rushers

- JAX – T. J. Yeldon – 10 rushes, 39 yards
- MIN – Mike Boone – 13 rushes, 91 yards, TD

Top receivers

- JAX – T. J. Yeldon – 5 receptions, 73 yards
- MIN – Cayleb Jones – 2 receptions, 23 yards

==== Week 3: vs. Seattle Seahawks ====
Week 3: Seattle Seahawks at Minnesota Vikings – Game summary

Quarter	1	2	3	4	Total
Seahawks	0	10	3	7	20
Vikings	0	6	0	15	21

at U.S. Bank Stadium, Minneapolis, Minnesota

- Date: August 24
- Game time: 7:00 p.m. CDT
- Game weather: None (indoor stadium)
- Game attendance: 66,676
- Referee: Brad Allen (122)
- TV: KMSP
- Recap, Game Book

Game information

First quarter

- No scoring plays.

Second quarter

- MIN – Latavius Murray 1-yard run (pass failed), 13:42. Vikings 6–0. Drive: 13 plays, 97 yards, 7:17.
- SEA – Chris Carson 6-yard run (Sebastian Janikowski kick), 7:36. Seahawks 7–6. Drive: 12 plays, 75 yards, 6:06.
- SEA – Sebastian Janikowski 35-yard field goal, 2:39. Seahawks 10–6. Drive: 8 plays, 36 yards, 3:54.

Third quarter

- SEA – Sebastian Janikowski 55-yard field goal, 10:09. Seahawks 13–6. Drive: 6 plays, 38 yards, 2:11.

Fourth quarter

- MIN – Jake Wieneke 1-yard pass from Kyle Sloter (Daniel Carlson kick), 9:09. Tied 13–13. Drive: 8 plays, 32 yards, 4:28.
- SEA – David Moore 36-yard pass from Alex McGough (Sebastian Janikowski kick), 4:10. Seahawks 20–13. Drive: 10 plays, 75 yards, 4:59.
- MIN – Chad Beebe 25-yard pass from Kyle Sloter (Kyle Sloter–Jake Wieneke pass), 0:47. Vikings 21–20. Drive: 9 plays, 53 yards, 1:38.

Top passers

- SEA – Alex McGough – 5/14, 140 yards, TD, INT
- MIN – Kirk Cousins – 17/28, 182 yards

Top rushers

- SEA – Mike Davis – 8 rushes, 31 yards
- MIN – Mike Boone – 9 rushes, 26 yards

Top receivers

- SEA – Caleb Scott – 2 receptions, 69 yards
- MIN – Chad Beebe – 5 receptions, 59 yards, TD

==== Week 4: at Tennessee Titans ====
Week 4: Minnesota Vikings at Tennessee Titans – Game summary

Quarter	1	2	3	4	Total
Vikings	0	3	3	7	13
Titans	3	0	0	0	3

at Nissan Stadium, Nashville, Tennessee

- Date: August 30
- Game time: 7:00 p.m. CDT
- Game weather: Cloudy, 83 °F (28 °C)
- Game attendance: 61,455
- Referee: Walt Coleman (65)
- TV: KMSP
- Recap, Game Book

Game information

First quarter

- TEN – Ryan Succop 24-yard field goal, 2:00. Titans 3–0. Drive: 16 plays, 69 yards, 9:31.

Second quarter

- MIN – Daniel Carlson 39-yard field goal, 1:55. Tied 3–3. Drive: 13 plays, 69 yards, 6:36.

Third quarter

- MIN – Daniel Carlson 22-yard field goal, 7:05. Vikings 6–3. Drive: 15 plays, 48 yards, 7:55.

Fourth quarter

- MIN – Brandon Zylstra 24-yard pass from Kyle Sloter (Daniel Carlson kick), 7:18. Vikings 13–3. Drive: 4 plays, 55 yards, 1:33.

Top passers

- MIN – Kyle Sloter – 11/15, 130 yards, TD
- TEN – Luke Falk – 13/24, 114 yards

Top rushers

- MIN – Mike Boone – 15 rushes, 56 yards
- TEN – Dalyn Dawkins – 17 rushes, 53 yards

Top receivers

- MIN – Brandon Zylstra – 4 receptions, 54 yards, TD
- TEN – Cameron Batson – 4 receptions, 46 yards

== Regular season ==
=== Schedule ===
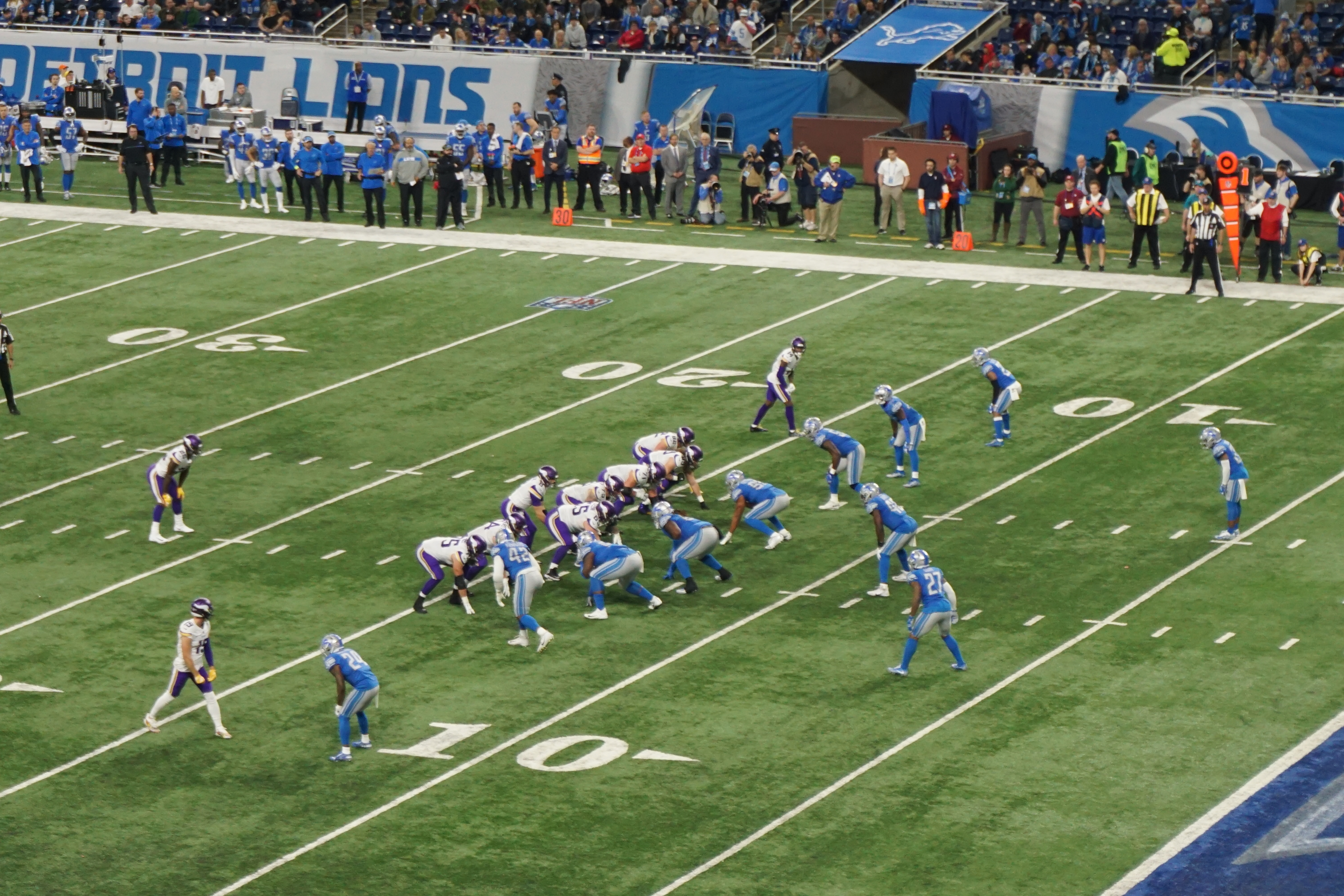
Minnesota in action at Detroit on December 23, 2018

Week	Date	Opponent	Result	Record	Venue	Attendance	NFL.com recap
1	September 9	San Francisco 49ers	**W** 24–16	1–0	U.S. Bank Stadium	66,673	Recap
2	September 16	at **Green Bay Packers**	**T** 29–29 (OT)	1–0–1	Lambeau Field	78,461	Recap
3	September 23	Buffalo Bills	**L** 6–27	1–1–1	U.S. Bank Stadium	66,800	Recap
4	September 27	at Los Angeles Rams	**L** 31–38	1–2–1	Los Angeles Memorial Coliseum	72,027	Recap
5	October 7	at Philadelphia Eagles	**W** 23–21	2–2–1	Lincoln Financial Field	69,696	Recap
6	October 14	Arizona Cardinals	**W** 27–17	3–2–1	U.S. Bank Stadium	66,801	Recap
7	October 21	at New York Jets	**W** 37–17	4–2–1	MetLife Stadium	77,982	Recap
8	October 28	New Orleans Saints	**L** 20–30	4–3–1	U.S. Bank Stadium	66,801	Recap
9	November 4	**Detroit Lions**	**W** 24–9	5–3–1	U.S. Bank Stadium	66,825	Recap
10	Bye						
11	November 18	at **Chicago Bears**	**L** 20–25	5–4–1	Soldier Field	61,651	Recap
12	November 25	**Green Bay Packers**	**W** 24–17	6–4–1	U.S. Bank Stadium	66,872	Recap
13	December 2	at New England Patriots	**L** 10–24	6–5–1	Gillette Stadium	65,878	Recap
14	December 10	at Seattle Seahawks	**L** 7–21	6–6–1	CenturyLink Field	69,007	Recap
15	December 16	Miami Dolphins	**W** 41–17	7–6–1	U.S. Bank Stadium	66,841	Recap
16	December 23	at **Detroit Lions**	**W** 27–9	8–6–1	Ford Field	61,641	Recap
17	December 30	**Chicago Bears**	**L** 10–24	8–7–1	U.S. Bank Stadium	66,878	Recap

Note: Intra-division opponents are in bold text.

=== Game summaries ===
==== Week 1: vs. San Francisco 49ers ====
Week 1: San Francisco 49ers at Minnesota Vikings – Game summary

Quarter	1	2	3	4	Total
49ers	0	3	10	3	**16**
**Vikings**	3	7	14	0	**24**

at U.S. Bank Stadium, Minneapolis, Minnesota

- Date: September 9
- Game time: 12:00 p.m. CDT
- Game weather: None (indoor stadium)
- Game attendance: 66,673
- Referee: Clay Martin (19)
- TV announcers (Fox): Kevin Burkhardt, Charles Davis and Pam Oliver
- Recap, Game Book

Game information

**First quarter**

- MIN – Daniel Carlson 48-yard field goal, 3:56. Vikings 3–0. **Drive: 7 plays, 40 yards, 3:21.**

**Second quarter**

- MIN – Stefon Diggs 22-yard pass from Kirk Cousins (Daniel Carlson kick), 13:39. Vikings 10–0. **Drive: 6 plays, 53 yards, 2:32.**
- SF – Robbie Gould 42-yard field goal, 11:42. Vikings 10–3. **Drive: 7 plays, 51 yards, 1:57.**

**Third quarter**

- MIN – Mike Hughes 28-yard interception return (Daniel Carlson kick), 10:41. Vikings 17–3.
- SF – Robbie Gould 33-yard field goal, 9:15. Vikings 17–6. **Drive: 5 plays, 60 yards, 1:26.**
- MIN – Kyle Rudolph 11-yard pass from Kirk Cousins (Daniel Carlson kick), 4:22. Vikings 24–6. **Drive: 9 plays, 75 yards, 4:53.**
- SF – Dante Pettis 22-yard pass from Jimmy Garoppolo (Robbie Gould kick), 0:31. Vikings 24–13. **Drive: 7 plays, 75 yards, 3:51.**

**Fourth quarter**

- SF – Robbie Gould 22-yard field goal, 8:09. Vikings 24–16. **Drive: 11 plays, 82 yards, 5:34.**

**Top passers**

- SF – Jimmy Garoppolo – 15/33, 261 yards, TD, 3 INT
- MIN – Kirk Cousins – 20/36, 244 yards, 2 TD

**Top rushers**

- SF – Matt Breida – 11 rushes, 46 yards
- MIN – Latavius Murray – 11 rushes, 42 yards

**Top receivers**

- SF – George Kittle – 5 receptions, 90 yards
- MIN – Adam Thielen – 6 receptions, 102 yards

The Vikings began the 2018 season with a home game against the San Francisco 49ers, their first home game since the Minneapolis Miracle in the divisional round of the 2017–18 NFL playoffs. The game saw quarterback Kirk Cousins and defensive tackle Sheldon Richardson make their regular season debuts for the Vikings, as well as the return of second-year running back Dalvin Cook, who had torn his ACL early in the 2017 season. The two teams traded punts to start the game, before the Vikings put a drive together on their second possession, culminating with a 48-yard field goal by rookie kicker Daniel Carlson. The 49ers then failed to pick up a first down on their next possession, giving the Vikings good field position on their own 47-yard line off the ensuing punt as the first quarter drew to a close. Runs by Latavius Murray and a 17-yard pass from Cousins to Cook gave the Vikings a third-and-3 situation on the San Francisco 22-yard-line, from where Cousins threw a 22-yard strike to Stefon Diggs, the 100th touchdown pass of his career. On the ensuing San Francisco possession, quarterback Jimmy Garoppolo linked up with tight end George Kittle and wide receiver Trent Taylor to get them into Minnesota territory, before a pass interference penalty against Vikings cornerback Trae Waynes put the 49ers just outside the red zone; however, the Minnesota defense stood firm and allowed just a 42-yard Robbie Gould field goal; however, on the Vikings' next drive, Cook fumbled the ball at the end of a 15-yard run, allowing San Francisco to regain possession. They marched down to the Vikings' 1-yard line, only for defensive tackle Linval Joseph to force a fumble from running back Alfred Morris, which safety Harrison Smith subsequently recovered. The Vikings were able to get out from under the shadow of their own goalposts and closed out the half with a 10–3 lead.

The Vikings defense forced a three-and-out to begin the second half, but only managed one first down on their ensuing possession before having to punt; however, three plays later, with the 49ers at third-and-8 from their own 20-yard line, the Vikings' rookie cornerback Mike Hughes intercepted a pass from Garoppolo and returned it 28 yards for a touchdown to put the Vikings up 17–3. Garoppolo responded immediately, however, completing a 56-yard pass to fullback Kyle Juszczyk to put the 49ers inside the Vikings' 20. As in the first half, though, the Minnesota defense held up and limited the 49ers to a 33-yard field goal. Cousins focused his attention on his wide receivers to begin the next Vikings possession, completing passes of 11 and 34 yards to Adam Thielen, the latter being the Vikings' longest completed pass of the day, to get into 49ers territory. Cook continued to run the ball, while Cousins' attention shifted to his tight ends, first completing a nine-yard pass to David Morgan II before an 11-yard completion to Kyle Rudolph for the Vikings' third touchdown of the day. A 36-yard completion from Garoppolo to Kittle was the highlight of the subsequent San Francisco drive, which culminated in a 22-yard touchdown pass to rookie wide receiver Dante Pettis with 30 seconds left in the quarter. The Vikings went three-and-out on their next possession; they soon had the ball back, as cornerback Xavier Rhodes intercepted Garoppolo, only to again have to punt, giving San Francisco the ball back at their own 14-yard line. A 39-yard pass from Garoppolo to Pettis got the 49ers into the Vikings' half, but a tackle for a five-yard loss by Smith led to another third-down situation for San Francisco; Garoppolo's third-down pass was incomplete, which should have meant them having to punt, only for Richardson to be flagged for roughing the passer, giving the 49ers a 15-yard advantage and an automatic first down. They were able to get down to the Vikings' 4-yard line, but were unable to get the ball into the end zone and again had to settle for a field goal, reducing the margin to 8 points. The Vikings again had to punt on their next possession, but a 10-yard sack by Smith on the next series meant San Francisco had to do the same, giving the Vikings the ball back with six minutes left to play. A combination of runs from Murray and Cook allowed the Vikings to take three minutes off the clock, but a scramble run from Cousins came up just short of another first down; however, the Vikings were able to draw the 49ers' defense offside, giving them a free five yards and the first down. They were able to take another minute off the clock before punting, giving the 49ers the ball with 1:49 to play. Needing a touchdown to stand a chance of taking the game to overtime, Garoppolo had to go for it, but was intercepted by Smith on the second play of the drive, allowing the Vikings to run out the clock and claim their first win of the season.

==== Week 2: at Green Bay Packers ====
Week 2: Minnesota Vikings at Green Bay Packers – Game summary

Quarter	1	2	3	4	OT	Total
Vikings	7	0	0	22	0	**29**
Packers	7	10	3	9	0	**29**

at Lambeau Field, Green Bay, Wisconsin

- Date: September 16
- Game time: 12:00 p.m. CDT
- Game weather: Partly cloudy, 80 °F (27 °C)
- Game attendance: 78,461
- Referee: Tony Corrente (99)
- TV announcers (Fox): Kevin Burkhardt, Charles Davis and Pam Oliver
- Recap, Game Book

Game information

**First quarter**

- GB – Josh Jackson blocked punt recovery in end zone (Mason Crosby kick), 7:28. Packers 7–0.
- MIN – Laquon Treadwell 14-yard pass from Kirk Cousins (Daniel Carlson kick), 3:04. Tied 7–7. **Drive: 8 plays, 57 yards, 4:24.**

**Second quarter**

- GB – Davante Adams 9-yard pass from Aaron Rodgers (Mason Crosby kick), 12:28. Packers 14–7. **Drive: 11 plays, 75 yards, 5:36.**
- GB – Mason Crosby 37-yard field goal, 0:00. Packers 17–7. **Drive: 5 plays, 43 yards, 1:37.**

**Third quarter**

- GB – Mason Crosby 40-yard field goal, 6:32. Packers 20–7. **Drive: 10 plays, 67 yards, 5:04.**

**Fourth quarter**

- MIN – Stefon Diggs 3-yard pass from Kirk Cousins (Daniel Carlson kick), 14:17. Packers 20–14. **Drive: 9 plays, 71 yards, 4:02.**
- GB – Mason Crosby 31-yard field goal, 7:35. Packers 23–14. **Drive: 10 plays, 62 yards, 6:42.**
- MIN – Stefon Diggs 75-yard pass from Kirk Cousins (Daniel Carlson kick), 7:18. Packers 23–21. **Drive: 2 plays, 75 yards, 0:17.**
- GB – Mason Crosby 48-yard field goal, 2:13. Packers 26–21. **Drive: 10 plays, 39 yards, 5:05.**
- GB – Mason Crosby 36-yard field goal, 1:45. Packers 29–21. **Drive: 4 plays, −5 yards, 0:19.**
- MIN – Adam Thielen 22-yard pass from Kirk Cousins (Kirk Cousins–Stefon Diggs pass), 0:31. Tied 29–29. **Drive: 8 plays, 75 yards, 1:14.**

**Overtime**

- No scoring plays.

**Top passers**

- MIN – Kirk Cousins – 35/48, 425 yards, 4 TD, INT
- GB – Aaron Rodgers – 30/42, 281 yards, TD

**Top rushers**

- MIN – Dalvin Cook – 10 rushes, 38 yards
- GB – Jamaal Williams – 16 rushes, 59 yards

**Top receivers**

- MIN – Adam Thielen – 12 receptions, 131 yards, TD
- GB – Jimmy Graham – 6 receptions, 95 yards

Week 2 saw the Vikings travel to Lambeau Field to take on their archrivals, the Green Bay Packers, against whom Vikings linebacker Anthony Barr effectively ended Packers quarterback Aaron Rodgers' 2017 season with a hit that broke Rodgers' collarbone.

The Packers received the ball first and were forced to punt. On the ensuing drive, the Packers forced the Vikings to go three-and-out, but the punt from the Vikings' Matt Wile was blocked by Geronimo Allison and recovered by the Packers' Josh Jackson for a touchdown. On Minnesota's next drive, quarterback Kirk Cousins led the Vikings on an eight-play, 57-yard touchdown drive to tie the game at 7–7, with the scoring pass going to Laquon Treadwell for 14 yards. Green Bay followed that with a nine-yard touchdown pass from Rodgers to Davante Adams early in the second quarter, making the game 14–7. After trading punts and a missed 48-yard field goal for the Vikings by rookie kicker Daniel Carlson, the Packers' Mason Crosby made a 37-yard field goal at the end of the first half to send the Packers to the locker room leading 17–7.

The Vikings received the ball after halftime, but their drive stalled and were forced to punt. Green Bay followed that up with a 40-yard field goal from Crosby with 6:32 left in the third quarter. After trading punts, the Vikings scored another touchdown on a three-yard pass to Stefon Diggs early in the fourth quarter to reduce the Packers' lead to six points. Green Bay followed that up with Crosby's third field goal of the day, this time from 31 yards, but the Vikings responded quickly on their next drive, as Cousins hit Diggs with a 75-yard touchdown pass to make it a 23–21 lead for the Packers. Crosby then made his fourth field goal of the day from 48 yards with 2:13 left in the fourth quarter. Cousins threw an interception on the first play of the Vikings' next drive, leading to a fifth Crosby field goal from 36 yards with 1:45 remaining, putting the Packers up 29–21. Cousins then led the Vikings 75 yards in eight plays, resulting in a 22-yard touchdown pass to Adam Thielen, but the Vikings needed a two-point conversion to tie the game. Cousins then connected with Diggs to tie the game at 29–29, with 31 seconds remaining in regulation. Green Bay was able to move down the field and into field goal range, but Crosby's 52-yard attempt missed left and the game went to overtime.

The Vikings won the overtime coin toss and received the ball. They moved 39 yards in seven plays, but Carlson's 49-yard attempt sailed wide right. Green Bay then was forced to punt after chewing 3:45 off the clock, and the Vikings started their next drive with 3:57 left to play. After moving 63 yards, the Vikings were at the Packers' 17-yard line with four seconds remaining in overtime, but Carlson missed his third field goal attempt of the game, this time from 35 yards, and again wide right. Carlson was waived the next day, replaced by veteran kicker Dan Bailey.

==== Week 3: vs. Buffalo Bills ====
Week 3: Buffalo Bills at Minnesota Vikings – Game summary

Quarter	1	2	3	4	Total
**Bills**	17	10	0	0	**27**
Vikings	0	0	0	6	**6**

at U.S. Bank Stadium, Minneapolis, Minnesota

- Date: September 23
- Game time: 12:00 p.m. CDT
- Game weather: None (indoor stadium)
- Game attendance: 66,800
- Referee: Alex Kemp (55)
- TV announcers (CBS): Jim Nantz, Tony Romo and Tracy Wolfson
- Recap, Game Book

Game information

**First quarter**

- BUF – Josh Allen 10-yard run (Steven Hauschka kick), 10:01. Bills 7–0. **Drive: 9 plays, 75 yards, 4:59.**
- BUF – Steven Hauschka 30-yard field goal, 7:24. Bills 10–0. **Drive: 4 plays, 4 yards, 1:57.**
- BUF – Jason Croom 26-yard pass from Josh Allen (Steven Hauschka kick), 5:09. Bills 17–0. **Drive: 2 plays, 25 yards, 0:48.**

**Second quarter**

- BUF – Josh Allen 1-yard run (Steven Hauschka kick), 12:14. Bills 24–0. **Drive: 11 plays, 65 yards, 5:45.**
- BUF – Steven Hauschka 50-yard field goal, 6:16. Bills 27–0. **Drive: 8 plays, 17 yards, 3:46.**

**Third quarter**

- No scoring plays.

**Fourth quarter**

- MIN – Kyle Rudolph 4-yard pass from Kirk Cousins (pass failed), 2:59. Bills 27–6. **Drive: 13 plays, 92 yards, 4:20.**

**Top passers**

- BUF – Josh Allen – 15/22, 196 yards, TD
- MIN – Kirk Cousins – 40/55, 296 yards, TD, INT

**Top rushers**

- BUF – Chris Ivory – 20 rushes, 56 yards
- MIN – Mike Boone – 2 rushes, 11 yards

**Top receivers**

- BUF – Chris Ivory – 3 receptions, 70 yards
- MIN – Adam Thielen – 14 receptions, 105 yards

Although the Vikings entered the game as 16.5- to 17-point favorites over the Bills, they were dominated at home in what is considered one of the biggest upsets in NFL history.

==== Week 4: at Los Angeles Rams ====
Week 4: Minnesota Vikings at Los Angeles Rams – Game summary

Quarter	1	2	3	4	Total
Vikings	7	13	8	3	**31**
**Rams**	7	21	10	0	**38**

at Los Angeles Memorial Coliseum, Los Angeles, California

- Date: September 27
- Game time: 7:20 p.m. CDT/5:20 p.m. PDT
- Game weather: Clear, 75 °F (24 °C)
- Game attendance: 72,027
- Referee: Brad Allen (122)
- TV announcers (Fox/NFLN): Joe Buck, Troy Aikman, Erin Andrews and Kristina Pink; (Amazon Prime): Hannah Storm and Andrea Kremer
- Recap, Game Book

Game information

**First quarter**

- MIN – Aldrick Robinson 16-yard pass from Kirk Cousins (Dan Bailey kick), 7:55. Vikings 7–0. **Drive: 13 plays, 75 yards, 7:05.**
- LAR – Todd Gurley 8-yard pass from Jared Goff (Sam Ficken kick), 1:55. Tied 7–7. **Drive: 12 plays, 75 yards, 6:00.**

**Second quarter**

- MIN – Dan Bailey 37-yard field goal, 10:05. Vikings 10–7. **Drive: 12 plays, 56 yards, 6:50.**
- LAR – Cooper Kupp 70-yard pass from Jared Goff (Sam Ficken kick), 9:28. Rams 14–10. **Drive: 2 plays, 75 yards, 0:37.**
- MIN – Aldrick Robinson 17-yard pass from Kirk Cousins (Dan Bailey kick), 8:04. Vikings 17–14. **Drive: 3 plays, 75 yards, 1:24.**
- LAR – Cooper Kupp 19-yard pass from Jared Goff (Sam Ficken kick), 3:47. Rams 21–17. **Drive: 4 plays, 71 yards, 1:50.**
- LAR – Brandin Cooks 47-yard pass from Jared Goff (Sam Ficken kick), 1:26. Rams 28–17. **Drive: 2 plays, 73 yards, 0:15.**
- MIN – Dan Bailey 39-yard field goal, 0:02. Rams 28–20. **Drive: 9 plays, 49 yards, 1:24.**

**Third quarter**

- LAR – Sam Ficken 34-yard field goal, 5:21. Rams 31–20. **Drive: 6 plays, 68 yards, 3:01.**
- MIN – Adam Thielen 45-yard pass from Kirk Cousins (Kirk Cousins–Latavius Murray pass), 3:35. Rams 31–28. **Drive: 5 plays, 75 yards, 1:46.**
- LAR – Robert Woods 31-yard pass from Jared Goff (Sam Ficken kick), 1:09. Rams 38–28. **Drive: 5 plays, 75 yards, 2:26.**

**Fourth quarter**

- MIN – Dan Bailey 40-yard field goal, 3:46. Rams 38–31. **Drive: 9 plays, 58 yards, 4:35.**

**Top passers**

- MIN – Kirk Cousins – 36/50, 422 yards, 3 TD
- LAR – Jared Goff – 26/33, 465 yards, 5 TD

**Top rushers**

- MIN – Kirk Cousins – 4 rushes, 28 yards
- LAR – Todd Gurley – 17 rushes, 83 yards

**Top receivers**

- MIN – Adam Thielen – 8 receptions, 135 yards, TD
- LAR – Cooper Kupp – 9 receptions, 162 yards, 2 TD

This was the first NFL broadcast in history to have an all-female announcing team (accessible only to Amazon Prime viewers).

==== Week 5: at Philadelphia Eagles ====
Week 5: Minnesota Vikings at Philadelphia Eagles – Game summary

Quarter	1	2	3	4	Total
**Vikings**	3	14	3	3	**23**
Eagles	0	3	3	15	**21**

at Lincoln Financial Field, Philadelphia, Pennsylvania

- Date: October 7
- Game time: 4:25 p.m. EDT/3:25 p.m. CDT
- Game weather: Partly cloudy, 79 °F (26 °C)
- Game attendance: 69,696
- Referee: Walt Coleman (65)
- TV announcers (Fox): Joe Buck, Troy Aikman and Erin Andrews
- Recap, Game Book

Game information

**First quarter**

- MIN – Dan Bailey 37-yard field goal, 5:02. Vikings 3–0. **Drive: 5 plays, 31 yards, 2:02.**

**Second quarter**

- PHI – Jake Elliott 30-yard field goal, 12:24. Tied 3–3. **Drive: 5 plays, 55 yards, 2:11.**
- MIN – Linval Joseph 64-yard fumble return (Dan Bailey kick), 4:12. Vikings 10–3.
- MIN – Adam Thielen 3-yard pass from Kirk Cousins (Dan Bailey kick), 0:21. Vikings 17–3. **Drive: 8 plays, 56 yards, 2:24.**

**Third quarter**

- MIN – Dan Bailey 22-yard field goal, 7:32. Vikings 20–3. **Drive: 6 plays, 91 yards, 2:01.**
- PHI – Jake Elliott 28-yard field goal, 2:57. Vikings 20–6. **Drive: 8 plays, 67 yards, 4:35.**

**Fourth quarter**

- PHI – Wendell Smallwood 12-yard pass from Carson Wentz (Wendell Smallwood run), 12:05. Vikings 20–14. **Drive: 10 plays, 66 yards, 4:14.**
- MIN – Dan Bailey 52-yard field goal, 2:47. Vikings 23–14. **Drive: 11 plays, 55 yards, 6:24.**

PHI – Zach Ertz 7-yard pass from Carson Wentz (Jake Elliott kick), 1:09. Vikings 23–21. **Drive: 7 plays, 75 yards, 1:38.**

**Top passers**

- MIN – Kirk Cousins – 30/37, 301 yards, TD
- PHI – Carson Wentz – 24/35, 311 yards, 2 TD

**Top rushers**

- MIN – Latavius Murray – 11 rushes, 42 yards
- PHI – Jay Ajayi – 8 rushes, 29 yards

**Top receivers**

- MIN – Adam Thielen – 7 receptions, 116 yards, TD
- PHI – Zach Ertz – 10 receptions, 110 yards, TD

==== Week 6: vs. Arizona Cardinals ====
Week 6: Arizona Cardinals at Minnesota Vikings – Game summary

Quarter	1	2	3	4	Total
Cardinals	3	7	0	7	**17**
**Vikings**	10	3	14	0	**27**

at U.S. Bank Stadium, Minneapolis, Minnesota

- Date: October 14
- Game time: 12:00 p.m. CDT
- Game weather: None (indoor stadium)
- Game attendance: 66,801
- Referee: Jerome Boger (23)
- TV announcers (Fox): Sam Rosen, Ronde Barber and Shane Bacon
- Recap, Game Book

Game information

**First quarter**

- ARI – Phil Dawson 26-yard field goal, 8:18. Cardinals 3–0. **Drive: 7 plays, 49 yards, 2:47.**
- MIN – Latavius Murray 21-yard run (Dan Bailey kick), 5:33. Vikings 7–3. **Drive: 6 plays, 75 yards, 2:45.**
- MIN – Dan Bailey 37-yard field goal, 2:03. Vikings 10–3. **Drive: 6 plays, 12 yards, 3:23.**

**Second quarter**

- ARI – Budda Baker 36-yard fumble return (Phil Dawson kick), 4:13. Tied 10–10.
- MIN – Dan Bailey 48-yard field goal, 0:07. Vikings 13–10. **Drive: 7 plays, 36 yards, 1:13.**

**Third quarter**

- MIN – Adam Thielen 13-yard pass from Kirk Cousins (Dan Bailey kick), 10:06. Vikings 20–10. **Drive: 10 plays, 75 yards, 4:54.**
- MIN – Kirk Cousins 7-yard run (Dan Bailey kick), 6:37. Vikings 27–10. **Drive: 3 plays, 43 yards, 1:11.**

**Fourth quarter**

- ARI – David Johnson 1-yard run (Phil Dawson kick), 6:57. Vikings 27–17. **Drive: 7 plays, 69 yards, 2:48.**

**Top passers**

- ARI – Josh Rosen – 21/31, 240 yards, INT
- MIN – Kirk Cousins – 24/34, 233 yards, TD, INT

**Top rushers**

- ARI – David Johnson – 18 rushes, 55 yards, TD
- MIN – Latavius Murray – 24 rushes, 155 yards, TD

**Top receivers**

- ARI – Christian Kirk – 6 receptions, 77 yards
- MIN – Adam Thielen – 11 receptions, 123 yards, TD

==== Week 7: at New York Jets ====
Week 7: Minnesota Vikings at New York Jets – Game summary

Quarter	1	2	3	4	Total
**Vikings**	7	3	10	17	**37**
Jets	7	0	3	7	**17**

at MetLife Stadium, East Rutherford, New Jersey

- Date: October 21
- Game time: 1:00 p.m. EDT/12:00 p.m. CDT
- Game weather: Cloudy, 46 °F (8 °C)
- Game attendance: 77,982
- Referee: Shawn Smith (14)
- TV announcers (Fox): Thom Brennaman, Chris Spielman and Shannon Spake
- Recap, Game Book

Game information

**First quarter**

- MIN – Adam Thielen 34-yard pass from Kirk Cousins (Dan Bailey kick), 13:22. Vikings 7–0. **Drive: 4 plays, 68 yards, 1:38.**
- NYJ – Chris Herndon 12-yard pass from Sam Darnold (Jason Myers kick), 1:01. Vikings 7–7. **Drive: 6 plays, 86 yards, 3:26.**

**Second quarter**

- MIN – Dan Bailey 26-yard field goal, 10:13. Vikings 10–7. **Drive: 8 plays, 27 yards, 2:50.**

**Third quarter**

- MIN – Latavius Murray 11-yard run (Dan Bailey kick), 8:15. Vikings 17–7. **Drive: 9 plays, 64 yards, 5:06.**
- MIN – Dan Bailey 22-yard field goal, 5:49. Vikings 20–7. **Drive: 4 plays, 5 yards, 2:06.**
- NYJ – Jason Myers 55-yard field goal, 2:39. Vikings 20–10. **Drive: 7 plays, 9 yards, 3:10.**

**Fourth quarter**

- MIN – Latavius Murray 38-yard run (Dan Bailey kick), 13:38. Vikings 27–10. **Drive: 2 plays, 51 yards, 1:08.**
- NYJ – Sam Darnold 1-yard run (Jason Myers kick), 10:27. Vikings 27–17. **Drive: 9 plays, 59 yards, 3:11.**
- MIN – Aldrick Robinson 34-yard pass from Kirk Cousins (Dan Bailey kick), 5:16. Vikings 34–17. **Drive: 7 plays, 61 yards, 3:17.**
- MIN – Dan Bailey 43-yard field goal, 3:22. Vikings 37–17. **Drive: 4 plays, −3 yards, 1:07.**

**Top passers**

- MIN – Kirk Cousins – 25/40, 241 yards, 2 TD
- NYJ – Sam Darnold – 17/42, 206 yards, TD, 3 INT

**Top rushers**

- MIN – Latavius Murray – 15 rushes, 69 yards, 2 TD
- NYJ – Isaiah Crowell – 11 rushes, 29 yards

**Top receivers**

- MIN – Adam Thielen – 9 receptions, 110 yards, TD
- NYJ – Trenton Cannon – 4 receptions, 69 yards

The Vikings recorded their first-ever road win against the Jets, ending a five-game road losing streak against them.

==== Week 8: vs. New Orleans Saints ====
Week 8: New Orleans Saints at Minnesota Vikings – Game summary

Quarter	1	2	3	4	Total
**Saints**	7	10	10	3	**30**
Vikings	7	6	0	7	**20**

at U.S. Bank Stadium, Minneapolis, Minnesota

- Date: October 28
- Game time: 7:20 p.m. CDT
- Game weather: None (indoor stadium)
- Game attendance: 66,801
- Referee: Craig Wrolstad (4)
- TV announcers (NBC): Al Michaels, Cris Collinsworth, Michele Tafoya and Terry McAulay
- Recap, Game Book

Game information

**First quarter**

- NO – Alvin Kamara 3-yard pass from Drew Brees (Wil Lutz kick), 10:33. Saints 7–0. **Drive: 8 plays, 81 yards, 4:27.**
- MIN – Stefon Diggs 1-yard pass from Kirk Cousins (Dan Bailey kick), 3:16. Tied 7–7. **Drive: 13 plays, 91 yards, 7:17.**

**Second quarter**

- MIN – Latavius Murray 1-yard run (kick failed, wide left), 11:57. Vikings 13–7. **Drive: 7 plays, 80 yards, 4:05.**
- NO – Wil Lutz 52-yard field goal, 7:27. Vikings 13–10. **Drive: 8 plays, 33 yards, 4:30.**
- NO – Alvin Kamara 1-yard run (Wil Lutz kick), 0:30. Saints 17–13. **Drive: 2 plays, 18 yards, 0:27.**

**Third quarter**

- NO – Wil Lutz 42-yard field goal, 8:19. Saints 20–13. **Drive: 9 plays, 21 yards, 4:09.**
- NO – P. J. Williams 45-yard interception return (Wil Lutz kick), 5:58. Saints 27–13.

**Fourth quarter**

- NO – Wil Lutz 42-yard field goal, 9:35. Saints 30–13. **Drive: 15 plays, 60 yards, 8:15.**
- MIN – Adam Thielen 1-yard pass from Kirk Cousins (Dan Bailey kick), 4:26. Saints 30–20. **Drive: 13 plays, 75 yards, 5:09.**

**Top passers**

- NO – Drew Brees – 18/23, 120 yards, TD, INT
- MIN – Kirk Cousins – 31/41, 359 yards, 2 TD, INT

**Top rushers**

- NO – Mark Ingram II – 13 rushes, 63 yards
- MIN – Latavius Murray – 13 rushes, 56 yards, TD

**Top receivers**

- NO – Michael Thomas – 5 receptions, 81 yards
- MIN – Stefon Diggs – 10 receptions, 119 yards, TD

This was a rematch of the Minneapolis Miracle from last year's divisional playoff game. There would be no miracle in this one however, as the Saints won 30–20 as the Vikings fell to 4–3–1.

==== Week 9: vs. Detroit Lions ====
Week 9: Detroit Lions at Minnesota Vikings – Game summary

Quarter	1	2	3	4	Total
Lions	0	6	0	3	**9**
**Vikings**	7	10	0	7	**24**

at U.S. Bank Stadium, Minneapolis, Minnesota

- Date: November 4
- Game time: 12:00 p.m. CST
- Game weather: None (indoor stadium)
- Game attendance: 66,825
- Referee: Pete Morelli (135)
- TV announcers (Fox): Thom Brennaman, Chris Spielman and Shannon Spake
- Recap, Game Book

Game information

**First quarter**

- MIN – Latavius Murray 1-yard run (Dan Bailey kick), 9:53. Vikings 7–0. **Drive: 9 plays, 65 yards, 5:07.**

**Second quarter**

- DET – Matt Prater 35-yard field goal, 13:16. Vikings 7–3. **Drive: 14 plays, 48 yards, 8:16.**
- DET – Matt Prater 35-yard field goal, 4:45. Vikings 7–6. **Drive: 10 plays, 28 yards, 5:44.**
- MIN – Adam Thielen 2-yard pass from Kirk Cousins (Dan Bailey kick), 3:20. Vikings 14–6. **Drive: 3 plays, 75 yards, 1:25.**
- MIN – Dan Bailey 39-yard field goal, 0:04. Vikings 17–6. **Drive: 5 plays, 31 yards, 0:35.**

**Third quarter**

- No scoring plays.

**Fourth quarter**

- MIN – Danielle Hunter 32-yard fumble return (Dan Bailey kick), 6:57. Vikings 24–6.
- DET – Matt Prater 37-yard field goal, 1:11. Vikings 24–9. **Drive: 17 plays, 69 yards, 5:46.**

**Top passers**

- DET – Matthew Stafford – 25/36, 199 yards
- MIN – Kirk Cousins – 18/22, 164 yards, TD, INT

**Top rushers**

- DET – Kerryon Johnson – 12 rushes, 37 yards
- MIN – Dalvin Cook – 10 rushes, 89 yards

**Top receivers**

- DET – Marvin Jones – 6 receptions, 66 yards
- MIN – Laquon Treadwell – 2 receptions, 37 yards

==== Week 11: at Chicago Bears ====
Week 11: Minnesota Vikings at Chicago Bears – Game summary

Quarter	1	2	3	4	Total
Vikings	0	0	3	17	**20**
**Bears**	3	11	0	11	**25**

at Soldier Field, Chicago, Illinois

- Date: November 18
- Game time: 7:20 p.m. CST
- Game weather: Partly cloudy, 33 °F (1 °C)
- Game attendance: 61,651
- Referee: John Parry (132)
- TV announcers (NBC): Al Michaels, Cris Collinsworth, Michele Tafoya and Terry McAulay
- Recap, Game Book

Game information

**First quarter**

- CHI – Cody Parkey 33-yard field goal, 5:58. Bears 3–0. **Drive: 12 plays, 64 yards, 6:54.**

**Second quarter**

- CHI – Anthony Miller 18-yard pass from Mitchell Trubisky (Mitchell Trubisky–Josh Bellamy pass), 6:00. Bears 11–0. **Drive: 13 plays, 82 yards, 7:13.**
- CHI – Cody Parkey 41-yard field goal, 0:50. Bears 14–0. **Drive: 10 plays, 41 yards, 3:57.**

**Third quarter**

- MIN – Dan Bailey 36-yard field goal, 0:07. Bears 14–3. **Drive: 8 plays, 13 yards, 3:15.**

**Fourth quarter**

- MIN – Dan Bailey 36-yard field goal, 11:46. Bears 14–6. **Drive: 5 plays, 11 yards, 2:33.**
- CHI – Eddie Jackson 27-yard interception return (Mitchell Trubisky–Adam Shaheen pass), 8:30. Bears 22–6.
- MIN – Aldrick Robinson 13-yard pass from Kirk Cousins (Kirk Cousins–Adam Thielen pass), 4:51. Bears 22–14. **Drive: 11 plays, 74 yards, 3:39.**
- CHI – Cody Parkey 48-yard field goal, 2:48. Bears 25–14. **Drive: 8 plays, 45 yards, 2:03.**
- MIN – Stefon Diggs 5-yard pass from Kirk Cousins (pass failed), 0:48. Bears 25–20. **Drive: 11 plays, 75 yards, 2:00.**

**Top passers**

- MIN – Kirk Cousins – 30/46, 262 yards, 2 TD, 2 INT
- CHI – Mitchell Trubisky – 20/31, 165 yards, TD, 2 INT

**Top rushers**

- MIN – Dalvin Cook – 9 rushes, 12 yards
- CHI – Jordan Howard – 18 rushes, 63 yards

**Top receivers**

- MIN – Stefon Diggs – 13 receptions, 126 yards, TD
- CHI – Taylor Gabriel – 7 receptions, 52 yards

==== Week 12: vs. Green Bay Packers ====
Week 12: Green Bay Packers at Minnesota Vikings – Game summary

Quarter	1	2	3	4	Total
Packers	7	7	0	3	**17**
**Vikings**	7	7	10	0	**24**

at U.S. Bank Stadium, Minneapolis, Minnesota

- Date: November 25
- Game time: 7:20 p.m. CST
- Game weather: None (indoor stadium)
- Game attendance: 66,872
- Referee: Bill Vinovich (52)
- TV announcers (NBC): Al Michaels, Cris Collinsworth and Michele Tafoya
- Recap, Game Book

Game information

**First quarter**

- GB – Davante Adams 15-yard pass from Aaron Rodgers (Mason Crosby kick), 5:54. Packers 7–0. **Drive: 7 plays, 68 yards, 3:37.**
- MIN – Dalvin Cook 26-yard pass from Kirk Cousins (Dan Bailey kick), 2:53. Tied 7–7. **Drive: 6 plays, 75 yards, 3:01.**

**Second quarter**

- GB – Aaron Jones 6-yard run (Mason Crosby kick), 14:16. Packers 14–7. **Drive: 7 plays, 75 yards, 3:37.**
- MIN – Stefon Diggs 30-yard pass from Kirk Cousins (Dan Bailey kick), 11:01. Tied 14–14. **Drive: 8 plays, 75 yards, 3:15.**

**Third quarter**

- MIN – Dan Bailey 37-yard field goal, 3:27. Vikings 17–14. **Drive: 7 plays, 25 yards, 3:54.**
- MIN – Adam Thielen 14-yard pass from Kirk Cousins (Dan Bailey kick), 0:27. Vikings 24–14. **Drive: 4 plays, 31 yards, 1:19.**

**Fourth quarter**

- GB – Mason Crosby 38-yard field goal, 2:20. Vikings 24–17. **Drive: 9 plays, 73 yards, 2:31.**

**Top passers**

- GB – Aaron Rodgers – 17/28, 198 yards, TD
- MIN – Kirk Cousins – 29/38, 342 yards, 3 TD

**Top rushers**

- GB – Aaron Jones – 17 rushes, 72 yards, TD
- MIN – Latavius Murray – 11 rushes, 33 yards

**Top receivers**

- GB – Davante Adams – 5 receptions, 69 yards, TD
- MIN – Adam Thielen – 8 receptions, 125 yards, TD

==== Week 13: at New England Patriots ====
Week 13: Minnesota Vikings at New England Patriots – Game summary

Quarter	1	2	3	4	Total
Vikings	0	7	3	0	**10**
**Patriots**	7	3	7	7	**24**

at Gillette Stadium, Foxborough, Massachusetts

- Date: December 2
- Game time: 4:25 p.m. EST/3:25 p.m. CST
- Game weather: Cloudy, 53 °F (12 °C)
- Game attendance: 65,878
- Referee: Craig Wrolstad (4)
- TV announcers (Fox): Joe Buck, Troy Aikman and Erin Andrews
- Recap, Game Book

Game information

**First quarter**

- NE – James Develin 1-yard run (Stephen Gostkowski kick), 9:33. Patriots 7–0. **Drive: 8 plays, 81 yards, 3:52.**

**Second quarter**

- NE – Stephen Gostkowski 20-yard field goal, 5:45. Patriots 10–0. **Drive: 15 plays, 68 yards, 8:16.**
- MIN – Adam Thielen 5-yard pass from Kirk Cousins (Dan Bailey kick), 0:15. Patriots 10–7. **Drive: 7 plays, 74 yards, 1:37.**

**Third quarter**

- MIN – Dan Bailey 39-yard field goal, 2:20. Tied 10–10. **Drive: 12 plays, 41 yards, 4:01.**
- NE – Josh Gordon 24-yard pass from Tom Brady (Stephen Gostkowski kick), 0:35. Patriots 17–10. **Drive: 4 plays, 75 yards, 1:45.**

**Fourth quarter**

- NE – James Develin 2-yard run (Stephen Gostkowski kick), 10:54. Patriots 24–10. **Drive: 6 plays, 50 yards, 3:12.**

**Top passers**

- MIN – Kirk Cousins – 32/44, 201 yards, TD, 2 INT
- NE – Tom Brady – 24/32, 311 yards, TD, INT

**Top rushers**

- MIN – Dalvin Cook – 9 rushes, 84 yards
- NE – Sony Michel – 17 rushes, 63 yards

**Top receivers**

- MIN – Stefon Diggs – 5 receptions, 49 yards
- NE – James White – 9 receptions, 92 yards

==== Week 14: at Seattle Seahawks ====
Week 14: Minnesota Vikings at Seattle Seahawks – Game summary

Quarter	1	2	3	4	Total
Vikings	0	0	0	7	**7**
**Seahawks**	0	3	0	18	**21**

at CenturyLink Field, Seattle, Washington

- Date: December 10
- Game time: 7:15 p.m. CST/5:15 p.m. PST
- Game weather: Cloudy, 48 °F (9 °C)
- Game attendance: 69,007
- Referee: Brad Allen (122)
- TV announcers (ESPN): Joe Tessitore, Jason Witten, Booger McFarland and Lisa Salters
- Recap, Game Book

Game information

**First quarter**

- No scoring plays.

**Second quarter**

- SEA – Sebastian Janikowski 37-yard field goal, 14:11. Seahawks 3–0. **Drive: 13 plays, 70 yards, 6:39.**

**Third quarter**

- No scoring plays.

**Fourth quarter**

- SEA – Sebastian Janikowski 35-yard field goal, 13:22. Seahawks 6–0. **Drive: 8 plays, 43 yards, 3:39.**
- SEA – Chris Carson 2-yard run (Russell Wilson–Tyler Lockett pass), 2:53. Seahawks 14–0. **Drive: 7 plays, 63 yards, 2:45.**
- SEA – Justin Coleman 29-yard fumble return (Sebastian Janikowski kick), 2:35. Seahawks 21–0.
- MIN – Dalvin Cook 6-yard pass from Kirk Cousins (Dan Bailey kick), 1:10. Seahawks 21–7. **Drive: 6 plays, 70 yards, 1:25.**

**Top passers**

- MIN – Kirk Cousins – 20/33, 208 yards, TD
- SEA – Russell Wilson – 10/20, 72 yards, INT

**Top rushers**

- MIN – Dalvin Cook – 13 rushes, 55 yards
- SEA – Chris Carson – 22 rushes, 90 yards, TD

**Top receivers**

- MIN – Stefon Diggs – 4 receptions, 76 yards
- SEA – Tyler Lockett – 5 receptions, 42 yards

==== Week 15: vs. Miami Dolphins ====
Week 15: Miami Dolphins at Minnesota Vikings – Game summary

Quarter	1	2	3	4	Total
Dolphins	0	10	7	0	**17**
**Vikings**	21	0	3	17	**41**

at U.S. Bank Stadium, Minneapolis, Minnesota

- Date: December 16
- Game time: 12:00 p.m. CST
- Game weather: None (indoor stadium)
- Game attendance: 66,841
- Referee: Walt Coleman (65)
- TV announcers (CBS): Ian Eagle, Dan Fouts and Evan Washburn
- Recap, Game Book

Game information

**First quarter**

- MIN – Stefon Diggs 13-yard pass from Kirk Cousins (Dan Bailey kick), 11:40. Vikings 7–0. **Drive: 6 plays, 76 yards, 3:20.**
- MIN – Dalvin Cook 13-yard run (Dan Bailey kick), 6:21. Vikings 14–0. **Drive: 6 plays, 60 yards, 2:59.**
- MIN – Latavius Murray 18-yard run (Dan Bailey kick), 1:32. Vikings 21–0. **Drive: 7 plays, 70 yards, 3:38.**

**Second quarter**

- MIA – Minkah Fitzpatrick 50-yard interception return (Jason Sanders kick), 7:44. Vikings 21–7.
- MIA – Jason Sanders 25-yard field goal, 0:14. Vikings 21–10. **Drive: 14 plays, 61 yards, 6:03.**

**Third quarter**

- MIA – Kalen Ballage 75-yard run (Jason Sanders kick), 14:49. Vikings 21–17. **Drive: 1 play, 75 yards, 0:11.**
- MIN – Dan Bailey 36-yard field goal, 8:40. Vikings 24–17. **Drive: 4 plays, 4 yards, 1:19.**

**Fourth quarter**

- MIN – Dan Bailey 34-yard field goal, 13:01. Vikings 27–17. **Drive: 9 plays, 57 yards, 4:35.**
- MIN – Aldrick Robinson 40-yard pass from Kirk Cousins (Dan Bailey kick), 9:54. Vikings 34–17. **Drive: 4 plays, 55 yards, 2:04.**
- MIN – Dalvin Cook 21-yard run (Dan Bailey kick), 7:49. Vikings 41–17. **Drive: 6 plays, 60 yards, 2:59.**

**Top passers**

- MIA – Ryan Tannehill – 11/24, 108 yards
- MIN – Kirk Cousins – 14/21, 215 yards, 2 TD, INT

**Top rushers**

- MIA – Kalen Ballage – 12 rushes, 123 yards, TD
- MIN – Dalvin Cook – 19 rushes, 136 yards, 2 TD

**Top receivers**

- MIA – Danny Amendola – 3 receptions, 30 yards
- MIN – Tyler Conklin – 2 receptions, 53 yards

==== Week 16: at Detroit Lions ====
Week 16: Minnesota Vikings at Detroit Lions – Game summary

Quarter	1	2	3	4	Total
**Vikings**	0	14	3	10	**27**
Lions	3	6	0	0	**9**

at Ford Field, Detroit, Michigan

- Date: December 23
- Game time: 1:00 p.m. EST/12:00 p.m. CST
- Game weather: None (indoor stadium)
- Game attendance: 61,641
- Referee: Walt Anderson (66)
- TV announcers (Fox): Chris Myers, Daryl Johnston and Laura Okmin
- Recap, Game Book

Game information

**First quarter**

- DET – Matt Prater 47-yard field goal, 7:30. Lions 3–0. **Drive: 5 plays, 28 yards, 2:40.**

**Second quarter**

- DET – Matt Prater 35-yard field goal, 10:39. Lions 6–0. **Drive: 9 plays, 21 yards, 4:11.**
- DET – Matt Prater 48-yard field goal, 4:05. Lions 9–0. **Drive: 8 plays, 36 yards, 4:17.**
- MIN – Stefon Diggs 8-yard pass from Kirk Cousins (Dan Bailey kick), 1:32. Lions 9–7. **Drive: 8 plays, 69 yards, 2:33.**
- MIN – Kyle Rudolph 44-yard pass from Kirk Cousins (Dan Bailey kick), 0:00. Vikings 14–9. **Drive: 5 plays, 70 yards, 0:36.**

**Third quarter**

- MIN – Dan Bailey 24-yard field goal, 8:54. Vikings 17–9. **Drive: 11 plays, 69 yards, 6:06.**

**Fourth quarter**

- MIN – Kyle Rudolph 4-yard pass from Kirk Cousins (Dan Bailey kick), 13:25. Vikings 24–9. **Drive: 9 plays, 53 yards, 5:38.**
- MIN – Dan Bailey 29-yard field goal, 4:15. Vikings 27–9. **Drive: 4 plays, −1 yard, 2:15.**

**Top passers**

- MIN – Kirk Cousins – 21/28, 253 yards, 3 TD
- DET – Matthew Stafford – 18/32, 116 yards

**Top rushers**

- MIN – Dalvin Cook – 16 rushes, 73 yards
- DET – Zach Zenner – 8 rushes, 45 yards

**Top receivers**

- MIN – Kyle Rudolph – 9 receptions, 122 yards, 2 TD
- DET – Kenny Golladay – 6 receptions, 58 yards

==== Week 17: vs. Chicago Bears ====
Week 17: Chicago Bears at Minnesota Vikings – Game summary

Quarter	1	2	3	4	Total
**Bears**	7	6	0	11	**24**
Vikings	0	3	7	0	**10**

at U.S. Bank Stadium, Minneapolis, Minnesota

- Date: December 30
- Game time: 3:25 p.m. CST
- Game weather: None (indoor stadium)
- Game attendance: 66,878
- Referee: Clete Blakeman (34)
- TV announcers (Fox): Joe Buck, Troy Aikman and Erin Andrews
- Recap, Game Book

Game information

**First quarter**

- CHI – Jordan Howard 6-yard run (Cody Parkey kick), 10:38. Bears 7–0. **Drive: 6 plays, 71 yards, 3:46.**

**Second quarter**

- CHI – Jordan Howard 1-yard run (kick failed, hit right upright), 7:17. Bears 13–0. **Drive: 10 plays, 85 yards, 5:39.**
- MIN – Dan Bailey 45-yard field goal, 0:53. Bears 13–3. **Drive: 8 plays, 37 yards, 1:04.**

**Third quarter**

- MIN – Stefon Diggs 2-yard pass from Kirk Cousins (Dan Bailey kick), 1:51. Bears 13–10. **Drive: 12 plays, 92 yards, 7:35.**

**Fourth quarter**

- CHI – Tarik Cohen 3-yard run (Mitchell Trubisky–Nick Kwiatkoski pass), 7:46. Bears 21–10. **Drive: 16 plays, 75 yards, 9:05.**
- CHI – Cody Parkey 42-yard field goal, 4:25. Bears 24–10. **Drive: 4 plays, 8 yards, 2:29.**

**Top passers**

- CHI – Mitchell Trubisky – 18/26, 163 yards
- MIN – Kirk Cousins – 20/33, 132 yards, TD

**Top rushers**

- CHI – Jordan Howard – 21 rushes, 109 yards, 2 TD
- MIN – Dalvin Cook – 11 rushes, 39 yards

**Top receivers**

- CHI – Taylor Gabriel – 4 receptions, 61 yards
- MIN – Stefon Diggs – 8 receptions, 47 yards, TD

=== Standings ===
==== Division ====
NFC North
	W	L	T	PCT	DIV	CONF	PF	PA	STK
^{(3)} Chicago Bears	12	4	0	.750	5–1	10–2	421	283	W4
Minnesota Vikings	8	7	1	.531	3–2–1	6–5–1	360	341	L1
Green Bay Packers	6	9	1	.406	1–4–1	3–8–1	376	400	L1
Detroit Lions	6	10	0	.375	2–4	4–8	324	360	W1

==== Conference ====
NFC
#	Team	Division	W	L	T	PCT	DIV	CONF	SOS	SOV	STK
**Division leaders**
1 (Note: New Orleans finished ahead of LA Rams based on head-to-head victory, claiming the No. 1 seed.)	New Orleans Saints	South	13	3	0	.813	4–2	9–3	.482	.488	L1
2	Los Angeles Rams	West	13	3	0	.813	6–0	9–3	.480	.428	W2
3	Chicago Bears	North	12	4	0	.750	5–1	10–2	.430	.419	W4
4	Dallas Cowboys	East	10	6	0	.625	5–1	9–3	.488	.444	W2
**Wild Cards**
5	Seattle Seahawks	West	10	6	0	.625	3–3	8–4	.484	.400	W2
6	Philadelphia Eagles	East	9	7	0	.563	4–2	6–6	.518	.486	W3
**Did not qualify for the postseason**
7	Minnesota Vikings	North	8	7	1	.531	3–2–1	6–5–1	.504	.355	L1
8 (Note: Atlanta finished ahead of Washington based on head-to-head victory. Atlanta finished ahead of Carolina based on head-to-head sweep. Washington finished ahead of Carolina based on head-to-head victory.)	Atlanta Falcons	South	7	9	0	.438	4–2	7–5	.482	.348	W3
9	Washington Redskins	East	7	9	0	.438	2–4	6–6	.486	.371	L2
10	Carolina Panthers	South	7	9	0	.438	2–4	5–7	.508	.518	W1
11	Green Bay Packers	North	6	9	1	.406	1–4–1	3–8–1	.488	.417	L1
12	Detroit Lions	North	6	10	0	.375	2–4	4–8	.504	.427	W1
13 (Note: NY Giants finished ahead of Tampa Bay based on head-to-head victory.)	New York Giants	East	5	11	0	.313	1–5	4–8	.527	.487	L3
14	Tampa Bay Buccaneers	South	5	11	0	.313	2–4	4–8	.523	.506	L4
15	San Francisco 49ers	West	4	12	0	.250	1–5	2–10	.504	.406	L2
16	Arizona Cardinals	West	3	13	0	.188	2–4	3–9	.527	.302	L4
**Tiebreakers** (Note: When breaking ties for three or more teams under the NFL's rules, they are first broken within divisions, then comparing only the highest-ranked remaining team from each division.)

== Pro Bowl ==
Four Vikings players were elected to the Pro Bowl when the rosters were announced on December 18, 2018, with both outside linebacker Anthony Barr and safety Harrison Smith named to their fourth Pro Bowls. Wide receiver Adam Thielen was named to his second Pro Bowl, having received his first nomination in 2017, while defensive end Danielle Hunter received his first Pro Bowl selection.

== Statistics ==
=== Team leaders ===
Category	Player(s)	Total
Passing yards	Kirk Cousins	4,298
Passing touchdowns	Kirk Cousins	30
Rushing yards	Dalvin Cook	615
Rushing touchdowns	Latavius Murray	6
Receptions	Adam Thielen	113
Receiving yards	Adam Thielen	1,373
Receiving touchdowns	Stefon Diggs; Adam Thielen	9
Points	Dan Bailey	93
Kickoff return yards	Ameer Abdullah	258
Punt return yards	Marcus Sherels	276
Tackles	Eric Kendricks	108
Sacks	Danielle Hunter	14.5
Interceptions	Anthony Harris; Harrison Smith	3
Forced fumbles	Anthony Barr; Mike Hughes; George Iloka; Jaleel Johnson; Linval Joseph; Eric Kendricks; Harrison Smith; Stephen Weatherly	1

Source: Minnesota Vikings' official website

=== League rankings ===
Category	Total yards	Yards per game	NFL rank (out of 32)
Passing offense	3,497	269.0	8th
Rushing offense	1,110	85.4	30th
Total offense	4,607	354.4	17th
Passing defense	2,803	215.6	5th
Rushing defense	1,404	108.0	13th
Total defense	4,207	323.6	5th

Source: NFL.com
