= Danielle Hunter =

Jamaican-born American football player (born 1994)

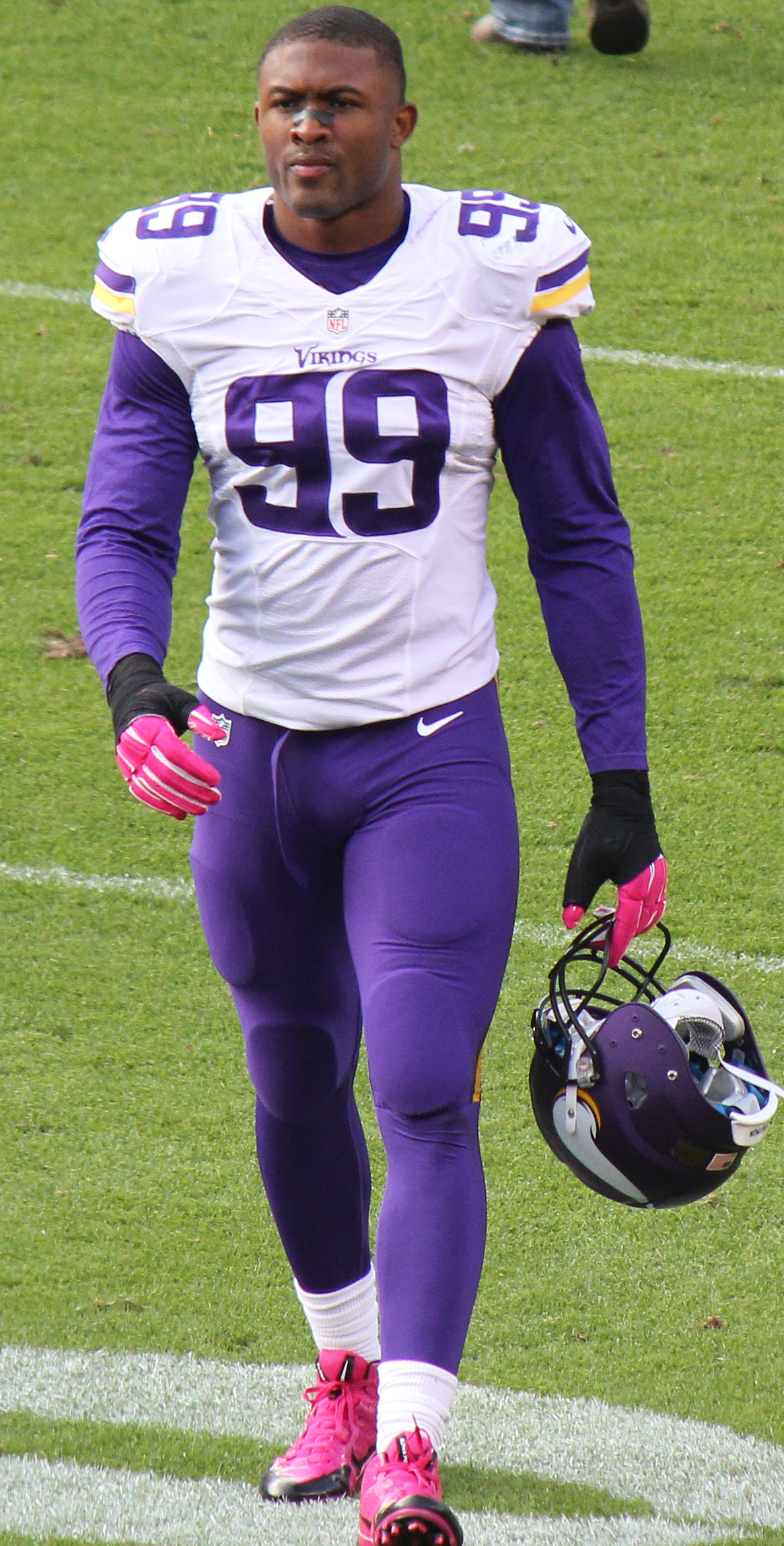
- Hunter with the Minnesota Vikings in 2015

No. 55 – Houston Texans
- Position: Defensive end
- Roster status: Active

Personal information
- Born: October 29, 1994 (age 32); St. Catherine, Jamaica
- Listed height: 6 ft 5 in (1.96 m)
- Listed weight: 263 lb (119 kg)

Career information
- High school: Morton Ranch (Katy, Texas, U.S.)
- College: LSU (2012–2014)
- NFL draft: 2015: 3rd round, 88th overall pick

Career history
- Minnesota Vikings (2015–2023); Houston Texans (2024–present)

Awards and highlights
- 2× Second-team All-Pro (2018, 2025); 5× Pro Bowl (2018, 2019, 2022–2024); PFWA All-Rookie Team (2015)

Career NFL statistics as of Week 11, 2026
- Total tackles: 581
- Sacks: 118.5
- Forced fumbles: 16
- Fumble recoveries: 5
- Pass deflections: 18
- Defensive touchdowns: 2
- Stats at Pro Football Reference

Danielle Hunter (/dəˈniːl/ də-NEEL; born October 29, 1994) is a Jamaican-American professional football defensive end for the Houston Texans of the National Football League (NFL). He played college football for the LSU Tigers and was selected by the Minnesota Vikings in the third round of the 2015 NFL draft. Hunter made four Pro Bowls with the Vikings prior to signing with the Texans in 2024.

== Early life ==
Born in St. Catherine, Jamaica on October 29, 1994, Hunter moved to the United States when he was 8 years old. He grew up in Katy, Texas, just west of Houston, where he attended Morton Ranch High School. He got signed up for youth football after a coach saw him playing tag with another boy who was trying to get away on roller skates. As a junior, he led his football team to their first Class 5A State Playoffs appearance despite playing defensive end for the first time as a freshman because he performed poorly in wide receiver tryouts. He tallied 63 tackles and seven sacks in his junior season. As a senior, he recorded 30 quarterback pressures, 11 tackles for losses, four sacks and four pass breakups on defense, while also catching four passes for 63 yards and a score on offense. In his final high school game against Lamar High School, he was credited with 16 stops. During his high school career, Hunter compiled 108 total tackles.

In track and field, Hunter competed in both sprinting and jumping events. Checking in at 6'6", 225 pounds, Hunter captured the district title in the high jump with a leap of 1.83 meters (6 feet, 0 inches) while also placing 5th in the long jump with a leap of 6.40 meters (20 feet, 11.5 inches) and 6th in the 400-meter dash with a time of 51.47 seconds at the 2011 District Meet.

Regarded as a four-star recruit by Rivals.com, Hunter was rated as the No. 37 prospect in the state of Texas. He was also ranked as the 14th best defensive end by Scout.com, 21st by Rivals.com and 34th by ESPN.com.

== College career ==
Hunter attended Louisiana State University from 2012 to 2014, where he was a two-year starter at defensive end for the Tigers.

=== Freshman ===
As a true freshman in 2012, Hunter was only 17 years old. He saw action in 12 games with no starts, playing most of the time on special teams, including kickoff coverage. He was active in every game with the exception of the South Carolina game in October 13. He had a season-high three tackles in a win over Idaho on September 15. Hunter ended his first year with 12 tackles, including three solo.

=== Sophomore ===
As a sophomore in 2013, Hunter played in 13 games, starting 10 of them after breaking into the starting lineup on September 21 against Auburn. In that game, his first start, he recorded a then career-best eight tackles and a quarterback hurry in a 35–21 win over the eventual national runner-up. He had an outstanding all-around game in a win over Florida with seven tackles, one tackle for loss and two pass breakups. He closed the year with four tackles, including a sack for a 4-yard loss, in the win over Iowa in the 2014 Outback Bowl. Hunter finished the season with 57 tackles, 8.0 tackles for loss, 3.0 sacks, five quarterback hurries and a pair of pass breaksups.

=== Junior ===
Hunter returned as a starter for his junior year in 2014. For the first time in his career, he played and started all 13 games for the Tigers, contributing as a key member of an LSU defense that led the Southeastern Conference (SEC) in total yards (316.8 yards per game) and pass defense (164.2 yards per game) and ranked No. 2 in the league in scoring defense with 17.5 points per game. In the season opener game, he helped the Tiger defense limit Wisconsin to 32 yards on 19 plays over the final 27 minutes of the contest as LSU erased a 17-point deficit to beat the Badgers 28–24. Against Mississippi State, he had six tackles, a sack and scooped up a Dak Prescott fumble on the first play of the second half, racing 25 yards for a touchdown. After setting a career-high in tackles with 12 against Auburn in week 4, he became the first LSU defensive lineman with double-digit tackles in a game since Glenn Dorsey had 11 tackles against Ole Miss on November 28, 2006. He was the first LSU defender to score on a fumble return since Tyrann Mathieu did it on a 23-yard return in win over Kentucky on October 1, 2011. In LSU's win over Kentucky in week 8, he had one of his best all-around games with six tackles, 2.0 tackles for loss, a quarterback hurry and three pass breakups. He played a key role in LSU's upset win over third-ranked Ole Miss with nine tackles, including two for losses, in a 10–7 win over the Rebels. He closed out the season with nine tackles, including one for a 4-yard loss, against Notre Dame in the Music City Bowl. For the season, Hunter recorded 73 tackles, including 30 solo stops, 1.5 sacks, six pass breakups and a pair of quarterback hurries. His 13.0 tackles for loss ranked 10th in the SEC.

He played in 38 games with 23 starts in three years, and started 23 straight games at defensive end. He opted to forgo his final season at LSU and declared for the 2015 NFL draft in January 2015. He finished his college career with 142 tackles, 21.0 tackles for loss (79 yards), 4.5 sacks (27 yards), eight pass breakups, seven quarterback hurries, and two forced fumbles (including a touchdown on a 25-yard fumble return).

== Professional career ==
=== Pre-draft ===
Following his junior season, Hunter entered the 2015 NFL draft. Described as a defensive end with tremendous athletic upside and a good motor, Hunter was often compared to Giants defensive end Jason Pierre-Paul in terms of his similar length, burst and potential.

External videos
- Hunter's NFL Combine workout
- Hunter gets drafted by Minnesota

Pre-draft measurables
Height	Weight	Arm length	Hand span	Wingspan	40-yard dash	10-yard split	20-yard split	20-yard shuttle	Three-cone drill	Vertical jump	Broad jump	Bench press
6 ft 5 1/8 in (1.96 m)	252 lb (114 kg)	34 1/4 in (0.87 m)	10 1/2 in (0.27 m)	6 ft 11 1/4 in (2.11 m)	4.57 s	1.57 s	2.67 s	4.35 s	6.95 s	36.5 in (0.93 m)	10 ft 10 in (3.30 m)	25 reps
All values from NFL Combine and Pro Day

At the 2015 NFL Combine, Hunter registered a time of 4.57 seconds in the 40-yard dash, the fastest time among all defensive linemen. He also did 25 repetitions on the 225-pound bench press.

=== Minnesota Vikings ===
==== 2015 ====
Hunter was selected by the Minnesota Vikings in the third round of the 2015 NFL draft with the 88th pick overall. The pick was part of a trade where the Vikings traded back in the third round, giving up their 80th overall pick for the third- and fifth-rounders (88th and 143rd overall) of the Detroit Lions. As a rookie in 2015, Hunter was the youngest player in the NFL, but quickly managed to earn a rotational role on defense and finished second among all NFL rookies and second in the team in sacks with 6. After two seasons in Minnesota, Hunter compiled 18.5 career sacks and four games in which he finished the day with at least 1.5 sacks. Since 1985, only Keith Millard and Kevin Williams registered more sacks than Hunter in their first two NFL seasons with the Vikings.

In his first career start, Hunter had four tackles, half a sack and was credited with a forced fumble in the Vikings' 16–10 victory over the Kansas City Chiefs in week 6. The forced fumble ended the Chiefs' second-to-last drive of the game. In week 8 against the Chicago Bears, Hunter recorded a sack and a tackle. In Week 15, Hunter continued to see an expanded role on the defensive line as he played 48 of 64 snaps in the Vikings' blowout win over the Chicago Bears 38–17, recording 1.5 sacks and five total tackles. Hunter finished the season with 33 total tackles (29 of them solo), 10 tackles for loss, 6 sacks, 25 quarterback pressures, 1 pass defensed and a forced fumble. On January 19, 2016, Hunter was named to the Pro Football Writers of America's (PFWA) 2015 NFL All-Rookie team.

==== 2016 ====
Hunter scored the first touchdown of his professional career on a 24-yard fumble return against the Tennessee Titans. Shortly after his fumble return, he broke through to sack Marcus Mariota deep in his own territory. Against the Green Bay Packers in Week 2, he was credited with 4 tackles and a strip sack as the Vikings opened their new U.S. Bank Stadium with a 17–14 victory. In Week 3 with the Vikings trailing 10–0 to the Carolina Panthers late in the first quarter, Hunter shoved left tackle Michael Oher to the turf and eluded guard Andrew Norwell to sack Cam Newton in the end zone for a safety. It was the first safety since Jared Allen had one on December 4, 2011, against the Denver Broncos. Hunter had his first career multi-sack game in Week 11 against the Arizona Cardinals, helping the Vikings end their four-game losing streak. Against the Dallas Cowboys in Week 13, Hunter had his second two-sack game of the season. In 16 games with the Vikings in 2016, Hunter accumulated 54 total tackles, 12.5 sacks (including a safety), one forced fumble, and one fumble recovery for a touchdown despite the fact that he did not start a single game. He was also credited with 55 quarterback hurries according to Sam Monson at Pro Football Focus (PFF). Hunter was the only Viking to be featured on NFL.com analyst Elliot Harrison's All-Under-25 team.

==== 2017 ====
In week 4 against the Detroit Lions, Hunter sacked quarterback Matthew Stafford twice and defended a pass during the 14–7 loss. These sacks were Hunter's first of the season. In week 8 against the Cleveland Browns in London, Hunter forced a fumble on running back Isaiah Crowell which was recovered by teammate Anthony Harris on the first offensive play of the second half. The Vikings eventually won the game 33–16. Hunter recorded a sack in the next three games against the Redskins, Rams, and Lions respectively. Hunter finished the regular season with 45 tackles, 7 sacks, one forced fumble, one fumble recovery, and two passes defended in 16 games started.

In the divisional round of the playoffs against the New Orleans Saints, Hunter recorded one tackle during the 29–24 win which became known as the Minneapolis Miracle. In the National Football Conference (NFC) Championship game against the Philadelphia Eagles, Hunter recorded 5 tackles and sacked Nick Foles once during the 38–7 loss.

==== 2018 ====
On June 27, 2018, Hunter signed a five-year, $72 million extension with the Vikings with $40 million guaranteed and a $15 million signing bonus. Hunter had a strong start to the 2018 season, recording at least one sack in each of the Vikings' first seven games, including 2 sacks against the Cardinals in Week 6. In Week 9, Hunter recorded a career-high 3.5 sacks, nine tackles, and returned a fumble recovery 32 yards for a touchdown in a 24–9 win over the Lions, earning him NFC Defensive Player of the Week. In that same game, the Vikings set a new franchise record with 10 sacks. Hunter would finish the 2018 season with 72 total tackles, 14.5 sacks, 21 tackles for loss, and one fumble recovery for a touchdown. Hunter's 14.5 sacks tied him with Von Miller for fourth most in the NFL. For these efforts, Hunter was awarded his first trip to the Pro Bowl, where he recorded a sack against Andrew Luck. In addition to the Pro Bowl nomination, Hunter was also named Second-team All-Pro by the Associated Press and First-team All-Pro by Sporting News and the PFWA. He was ranked 57th by his fellow players on the NFL Top 100 Players of 2019.

==== 2019 ====
In Week 1 against the Atlanta Falcons, Hunter recorded his first sack of the season on Matt Ryan as the Vikings won 28–12. In Week 14 against the Lions, he sacked David Blough 3 times in the 20–7 win, earning him NFC Defensive Player of the Week. In the game, Hunter became the youngest player in NFL history to reach 50 sacks. Hunter finished the regular season with 70 tackles, 14.5 sacks, three forced fumbles, and one fumble recovery in 16 games started. On December 17, 2019, Hunter was nominated to play in his second straight Pro Bowl.

In the NFC Wild Card game against the New Orleans Saints, Hunter recorded a strip sack on Drew Brees which was recovered by teammate Jalyn Holmes during the 26–20 overtime win. In the divisional round against the San Francisco 49ers, Hunter sacked Jimmy Garoppolo once during the 27–10 loss. He was ranked 40th by his fellow players on the NFL Top 100 Players of 2020.

==== 2020 ====
On September 9, 2020, Hunter was placed on injured reserve with a neck injury. He underwent season-ending surgery to clean up a herniated disc in his neck.

==== 2021 ====
Hunter started off the season with six sacks in the first seven games, before suffering a season ending torn pectoral muscle placing him on injured reserve for the second consecutive season.

==== 2022 ====
Hunter was able to stay healthy, playing in every game for the first time since 2019. Hunter recorded 65 total tackles and 10.5 sacks. He was named to his third career Pro Bowl.

==== 2023 ====
On July 30, 2023, Hunter signed a new one-year deal with the Vikings.

In October, Hunter was named NFC Defensive Player of the Month for his strong performance. He was ranked 68th by his fellow players on the NFL Top 100 Players of 2024.

=== Houston Texans ===
On March 14, 2024, Hunter signed a two-year, $49 million contract with the Houston Texans. He started all 17 games for Houston, posting 12.0 sacks and 46 combined tackles. Hunter was ranked 25th by his fellow players on the NFL Top 100 Players of 2025.

On March 19, 2025, Hunter and the Texans agreed to a one-year, $35.6 million contract extension. In Week 10, Hunter recorded 3.5 sacks, seven tackles, four tackles for loss, and a forced fumble in a 36–29 win over the Jacksonville Jaguars, earning AFC Defensive Player of the Week.

On March 5, 2026, he signed a one-year, $40 million contract extension.

== Career statistics ==
Legend
	Led the league
**Bold**	Career high

=== NFL ===
==== Regular season ====
Year	Team	Games		Tackles						Interceptions						Fumbles			
Year	Team	GP	GS	Cmb	Solo	Ast	Sck	TFL	Sfty	PD	Int	Yds	Avg	Lng	TD	FF	FR	Yds	TD
2015	MIN	14	1	33	29	4	6.0	8	0	0	0	0	0.0	0	0	1	0	0	0
2016	MIN	16	0	56	34	22	12.5	11	**1**	1	0	0	0.0	0	0	1	**1**	24	**1**
2017	MIN	16	16	45	27	18	7.0	12	0	2	0	0	0.0	0	0	1	**1**	0	0
2018	MIN	16	16	72	51	21	14.5	21	0	0	0	0	0.0	0	0	0	**1**	**32**	**1**
2019	MIN	16	16	70	52	18	14.5	15	0	0	0	0	0.0	0	0	3	**1**	4	0
2020	MIN	0	0	Did not play due to injury															
2021	MIN	7	7	38	23	15	6.0	6	0	0	0	0	0.0	0	0	0	0	0	0
2022	MIN	17	17	65	46	19	10.5	12	0	3	0	0	0.0	0	0	1	0	0	0
2023	MIN	17	17	**83**	**54**	**29**	**16.5**	**23**	0	2	0	0	0.0	0	0	**4**	0	0	0
2024	HOU	17	17	46	31	15	12.0	17	0	3	0	0	0.0	0	0	1	0	0	0
2025	HOU	17	17	54	28	26	15.0	15	0	3	0	0	0.0	0	0	3	**1**	0	0
2026	HOU	8	8	19	9	10	4.0	3	0	**4**	0	0	0.0	0	0	1	0	0	0
Career		161	132	581	384	197	118.5	143	1	18	0	0	0.0	0	0	16	5	60	2

==== Postseason ====
Year	Team	Games		Tackles						Interceptions						Fumbles			
Year	Team	GP	GS	Cmb	Solo	Ast	Sck	TFL	Sfty	PD	Int	Yds	Avg	Lng	TD	FF	FR	Yds	TD
2015	MIN	1	0	1	1	0	0.0	0	0	0	0	0	0.0	0	0	0	0	0	0
2017	MIN	2	2	9	**6**	3	1.0	**2**	0	0	0	0	0.0	0	0	0	0	0	0
2019	MIN	2	2	**10**	5	**5**	2.5	1	0	**1**	0	0	0.0	0	0	1	0	0	0
2022	MIN	1	1	4	3	1	1.0	1	0	0	0	0	0.0	0	0	0	0	0	0
2024	HOU	2	2	7	4	3	0.0	0	0	0	0	0	0.0	0	0	0	0	0	0
2025	HOU	2	2	5	5	0	**3.0**	**2**	0	0	0	0	0.0	0	0	**2**	0	0	0
Career		10	9	36	24	12	7.5	6	0	1	0	0	0.0	0	0	3	0	0	0

=== College ===
Season	Team	GP	GS	Tackles					Interceptions						Fumbles			
Season	Team	GP	GS	Cmb	Solo	Ast	Sck	TfL	PD	Int	Yds	Avg	Lng	TD	FF	FR	Yds	TD
2012	LSU	12	0	12	3	9	0.0	0.0	0	0	0	0.0	0	0	0	0	0	0
2013	LSU	13	10	57	19	38	**3.0**	8.0	2	0	0	0.0	0	0	**1**	0	0	0
2014	LSU	13	13	**73**	**30**	**43**	1.5	**13.0**	**6**	0	0	0.0	0	0	**1**	**1**	**25**	**1**
Totals		38	23	142	52	90	4.5	21.0	8	0	0	0.0	0	0	2	1	25	1
