= Laquon Treadwell =

American football player (born 1995)

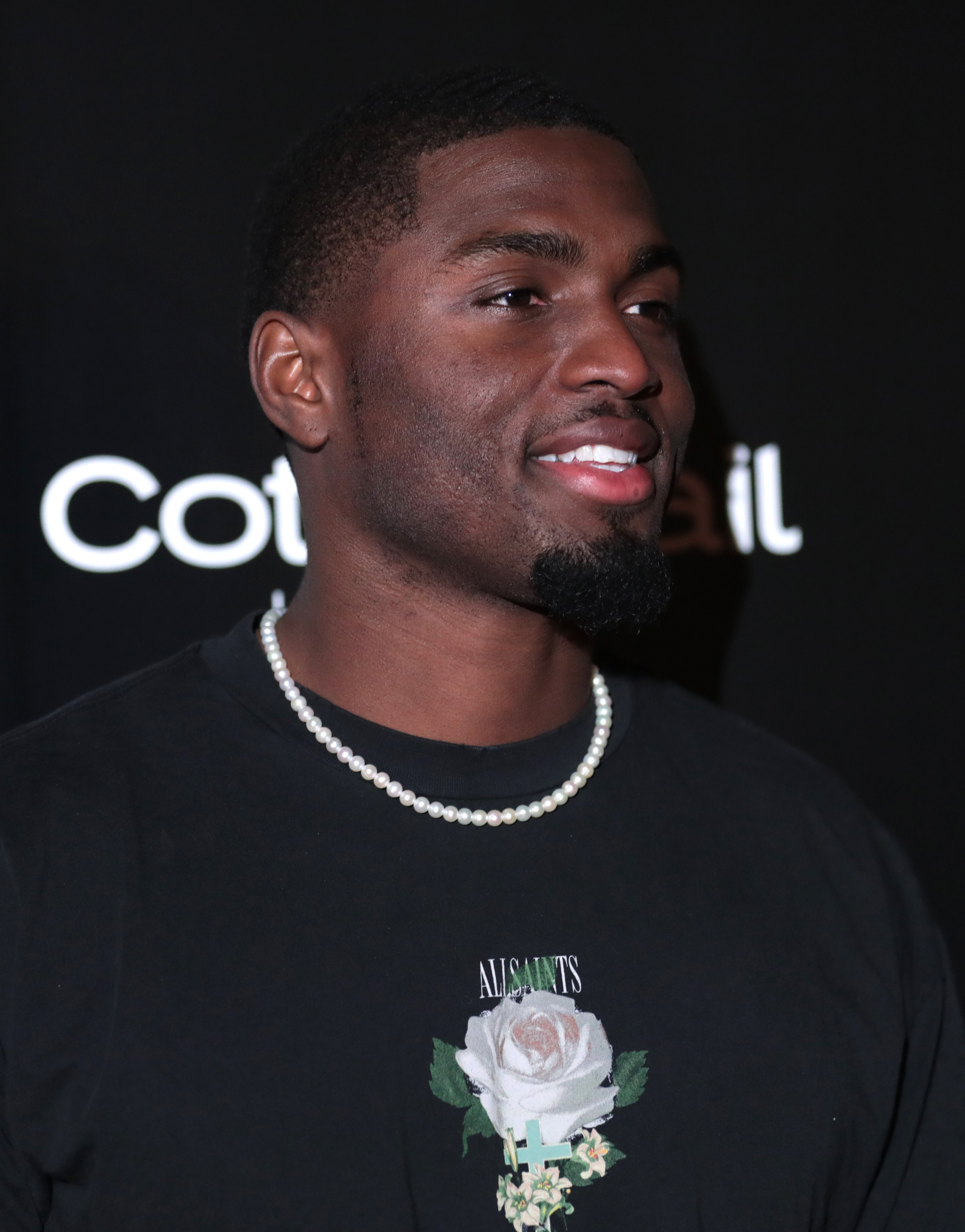
- Treadwell in 2023

No. 13 – Indianapolis Colts
- Position: Wide receiver
- Roster status: Active

Personal information
- Born: June 14, 1995 (age 31); Chicago, Illinois, U.S.
- Listed height: 6 ft 2 in (1.88 m)
- Listed weight: 215 lb (98 kg)

Career information
- High school: Crete-Monee (Crete, Illinois)
- College: Ole Miss (2013–2015)
- NFL draft: 2016: 1st round, 23rd overall pick

Career history
- Minnesota Vikings (2016–2019); Atlanta Falcons (2020); Jacksonville Jaguars (2021); New England Patriots (2022)*; Arizona Cardinals (2022)*; Seattle Seahawks (2022); Baltimore Ravens (2023); Indianapolis Colts (2024–present)
- * Offseason or practice squad member only

Awards and highlights
- Second-team All-American (2015); First-team All-SEC (2015); SEC Freshman of the Year (2013)

Career NFL statistics as of 2025
- Receptions: 111
- Receiving yards: 1,242
- Receiving touchdowns: 5
- Stats at Pro Football Reference

Laquon Malik Treadwell (born June 14, 1995) is an American professional football wide receiver for the Indianapolis Colts of the National Football League (NFL). He played college football for the Ole Miss Rebels from 2013 to 2015, earning second-team All-American honors in 2015. He left as the school's all-time leader in receptions with 202 during the course of three seasons. Treadwell was selected by the Minnesota Vikings in the first round of the 2016 NFL draft. He has also been a member of the Atlanta Falcons, Jacksonville Jaguars, New England Patriots, Arizona Cardinals, Seattle Seahawks, and Baltimore Ravens.

== Early life ==
Treadwell attended Crete-Monee High School in suburban Chicago, where he finished his three-year football career as the second-leading receiver in Illinois prep history with 3,563 yards. He played primarily as a wide receiver during his career, but he was also the team's quarterback as a freshman and also played on defense his sophomore through senior years. As a sophomore, he caught 58 passes for 811 yards and seven touchdowns. As a junior, he was named the NWI Times Offensive Player of the Year, Southland Conference Offensive Player of the Year and a first-team all-state pick when he recorded 75 catches for 1,391 yards and 18 touchdowns on offense and 45 tackles (10 for loss) and eight sacks on defense. Treadwell was named the Chicago Tribune Player of the Year, NWI Times Offensive Player of the Year, and all-state first-team as a senior after leading Crete-Monee to a 14–0 record and the Class 6A state title; he hauled in 81 catches for 1,424 yards and 16 touchdowns and rushed for 257 yards and seven more scores on the ground, while on defense he compiled 56 tackles and six interceptions. For his senior season efforts, Treadwell was named an All-American selection by Under Armour, USA Today, MaxPreps and SuperPrep. As a standout basketball guard and forward, Treadwell averaged 13.0 points and 8.6 rebounds per game for the Warriors.

Following his senior season, Treadwell played in the 2013 Under Armour All-America Game, where he was covered by the nation's No.1 cornerback and Florida recruit Vernon Hargreaves III, according to the Orlando Sentinel. He finished the game with six catches for 46 yards.

Regarded as Illinois’ top football recruit in 2013, Treadwell was rated a 5-star recruit by Rivals.com, Scout.com, 247Sports.com and MaxPreps and the nation's No. 1 wide receiver by Tom Lemming, Rivals.com, and ESPN.com. He was listed as the No. 5 overall recruit in the nation by Rivals.com, No. 6 by MaxPreps, No. 19 by ESPN.com, No. 28 by 247Sports.com, and No. 30 by Scout.com. Checking in at 6 ft 3 in (1.91 m), 195 pounds (88 kg), Treadwell ran a reported 4.40 in the 40-yard dash according to 247Sports. He was also the No. 1 ranked wide receiver in the 2013 class at the 247Sports Composite Rankings. Treadwell committed to the University of Mississippi on November 30, 2012. Treadwell's former high school teammate and close friend, Anthony Standifer, who is a defensive back at Ole Miss, was the one that initially got Treadwell interested in the Rebels.

College recruiting
Name	Hometown	School	Height	Weight	40^{‡}	Commit date
Laquon Treadwell; WR	Chicago, Illinois	Crete-Monee HS	6 ft 3 in (1.91 m)	195 lb (88 kg)	4.30	Nov 30, 2012
Laquon Treadwell; WR	Recruit ratings: Scout: Rivals:					
Overall recruit ranking: Scout: 3 (WR); 30 (national) Rivals: 1 (WR); 1 (IL); 5 (national)
‡ Refers to 40-yard dash; Note: In many cases, Scout, Rivals, 247Sports, On3, and ESPN may conflict in their listings of height, weight and 40 time.; In these cases, the average was taken. ESPN grades are on a 100-point scale.; Sources: "2013 Ole Miss Football Commitment List". Rivals.; "2013 Ole Miss College Football Team Recruiting Prospects". Scout.; "Scout.com Team Recruiting Rankings". Scout.; "2013 Team Ranking". Rivals.com.

== College career ==
A member of the highly ranked 2013 University of Mississippi signing class, Treadwell played three seasons for the Rebels. He finished his career as the all-time leading pass catcher in Ole Miss history with 202 career receptions (seventh-most in Southeastern Conference (SEC) history) and ranks third in receiving yards with 2,393 and touchdowns with 21, as well as tied for second with nine career 100-yard receiving games. Treadwell managed at least one catch in all 35 games in which he played for the Rebels.

=== Freshman season (2013) ===
Treadwell exploded onto the college scene with a record-breaking rookie season, establishing Ole Miss' freshman records with 72 receptions for 608 receiving yards and five touchdown catches. As a result of his outstanding play, he was named SEC Freshman of the Year by the league coaches, becoming the first player in school history to receive the distinction. He also established a school freshman record with nine catches in his Rebel debut at Vanderbilt and matched that total again in the regular-season finale at Mississippi State. He played in every game of the season and made 12 starts as a slot receiver. In the season opener at Vanderbilt on August 29, Treadwell earned his first start in his college debut and made the most of it, breaking an Ole Miss freshman record with nine catches for 82 yards and hauling in a two-point conversion; he was named SEC Freshman of the Week for his performance. In Week 4 at #1 Alabama, he had four catches for 51 yards, one rush for 1 yard and threw his lone career interception. Against #9 Texas A&M on October 12, Treadwell caught a team-high eight passes for 77 yards while scoring his first two collegiate touchdowns. In the Rebels' 34–24 victory over Arkansas, he contributed with a game-high eight catches for 39 yards and a touchdown. The next week against Troy, he collected four catches for 53 yards and two touchdowns, including a highlight-reel catch-and-run in which he broke five tackles on his way to the end zone. In the final game of the season at Mississippi State on November 28, Treadwell tied his own Ole Miss freshman record with nine catches for 57 yards. During the game, he also completed a 19-yard pass to quarterback Bo Wallace on a trick play and forced and recovered a fumble to regain possession after a Wallace interception.

2013 season breakdown
			Receiving					Rushing				
Date	Opponent	Result	Rec	Yards	Avg	Long	TDs	Att	Yards	Avg	Long	TDs
8/29	@Vanderbilt	W 39–35	9	82	9.1	17	0	0	0	0.0	0	0
9/7	Southeast Missouri State	W 31–13	2	27	13.5	16	0	1	7	7.0	7	0
9/14	@Texas	W 44–23	5	45	9.0	17	0	0	0	0.0	0	0
9/28	@Alabama	L 25–0	4	51	12.8	38	0	1	1	1.0	1	0
10/5	@Auburn	L 30–22	4	45	11.3	29	0	0	0	0.0	0	0
10/12	Texas A&M	L 41–38	8	77	9.6	19	2	0	0	0.0	0	0
10/19	LSU	W 27–24	7	43	6.1	13	0	0	0	0.0	0	0
10/26	Idaho	W 59–14	2	15	7.5	9	0	0	0	0.0	0	0
11/9	Arkansas	W 34–24	8	39	4.9	14	1	0	0	0.0	0	0
11/16	Troy	W 51–21	4	53	13.3	25	2	0	0	0.0	0	0
11/23	Missouri	L 24–10	5	23	4.6	9	0	0	0	0.0	0	0
11/28	@Mississippi State	L 17–10	9	57	6.3	19	0	0	0	0.0	0	0
12/30	vs. @Georgia Tech	W 25–17	5	51	10.2	27	0	1	−6	−6.0	0	0
2013 totals			72	608	8.4	38	5	3	2	0.7	7	0

=== Sophomore season (2014) ===
On November 1, 2014, with 1:30 left in the game against #3 Auburn, Treadwell caught a screen pass and took it to the Tigers' 1 yard line before being tackled from behind and bending awkwardly. As a result of the gruesome injury, Treadwell broke his tibia and dislocated his ankle, and adding insult to the injury, he fumbled the ball, which was recovered in the end zone by Auburn's linebacker Cassanova McKinzy, sealing the game for the Tigers.

2014 season breakdown
			Receiving					Rushing				
Date	Opponent	Result	Rec	Yards	Avg	Long	TDs	Att	Yards	Avg	Long	TDs
8/28	Boise State	W 35–13	7	105	15.0	31	1	0	0	0.0	0	0
9/6	@Vanderbilt	W 41–3	4	31	7.8	14	0	0	0	0.0	0	0
9/13	Louisiana-Lafayette	W 56–15	4	48	12.0	30	0	0	0	0.0	0	0
9/27	Memphis	W 24–3	5	123	24.6	63	2	1	−4	−4.0	0	0
10/4	Alabama	W 23–17	5	55	11.0	16	1	1	−3	−3.0	0	0
10/11	@Texas A&M	W 35–20	5	53	10.6	21	0	0	0	0.0	0	0
10/18	Tennessee	W 34–3	4	43	10.8	14	0	0	0	0.0	0	0
10/25	@LSU	L 10–7	4	71	17.8	27	0	0	0	0.0	0	0
11/1	Auburn	L 35–31	10	103	10.3	20	1	0	0	0.0	0	0
2014 totals			48	632	13.2	63	5	2	−7	−3.5	0	0

=== Junior season (2015) ===
On January 4, 2016, Treadwell announced he would forego his final year of eligibility at Ole Miss to enter the 2016 NFL draft. Treadwell stated: "After sitting down with my family, we have decided it is time for me to take the next step in my career and enter the NFL draft; it's always been a dream of mine to play in the NFL, and I can't thank my teammates, coaches and our great fans enough for their unbelievable support since the first day I stepped foot on campus. No matter how far life may take us, I will always be an Ole Miss Rebel. God bless."

2015 season breakdown
			Receiving					Rushing				
Date	Opponent	Result	Rec	Yards	Avg	Long	TDs	Att	Yards	Avg	Long	TDs
9/5	Tennessee-Martin	W 76–3	4	44	11.0	15	0	0	0	0.0	0	0
9/12	Fresno State	W 73–21	5	73	14.6	28	0	0	0	0.0	0	0
9/19	@Alabama	W 43–37	5	80	16.0	29	1	0	0	0.0	0	0
9/26	Vanderbilt	W 27–16	8	135	16.9	32	0	0	0	0.0	0	0
10/3	@Florida	L 38–10	5	42	8.4	15	0	0	0	0.0	0	0
10/10	New Mexico State	W 52–3	8	136	17.0	37	2	0	0	0.0	0	0
10/17	@Memphis	L 37–24	14	144	10.3	21	1	0	0	0.0	0	0
10/24	Texas A&M	W 23–3	5	102	20.4	58	1	0	0	0.0	0	0
10/31	@Auburn	W 27–19	7	114	16.3	33	1	0	0	0.0	0	0
11/7	Arkansas	L 53–52 (OT)	7	132	18.9	42	1	0	0	0.0	0	0
11/21	LSU	W 38–17	4	58	14.5	27	1	1	−5	−5.0	0	0
11/28	@Mississippi State	W 38–27	4	22	5.5	17	0	0	0	0.0	0	0
1/1	vs. Oklahoma State	W 48–20	6	71	11.8	34	3	0	0	0.0	0	0
2015 totals			82	1,153	14.1	58	11	1	−5	−5.0	0	0

== Professional career ==
=== Pre-draft ===
Prior to the draft, NFL Network's analyst Mike Mayock ranked Treadwell second overall among wide receivers and compared him to Houston Texans' superstar wide receiver DeAndre Hopkins. He also gave him a grade of 6.25, only behind Notre Dame's Will Fuller.

On February 22, Treadwell announced to NFL.com that he would not take part in the 40-yard dash event at the combine, stating that he wanted more time before running it in front of NFL team scouts and general managers. He said he set his goal in the mid-to-high 4.4s or 4.5s. "I figured if I have enough time to work on it, I'll get the time I want," Treadwell said. He did perform in the vertical jump at the combine, and his 33-inch leap placed him in the bottom half of the wide receiver group. Measuring in at 6 ft 2 in (1.88 m), 217 pounds (98 kg) at Ole Miss' pro day, Treadwell confirmed the relatively slow 40-yard dash time that scouts anticipated; in his first attempt, he clocked a pedestrian 4.65, and on his second chance, he ran a 4.63 with a 1.62 10-yard split. However, the more surprising result for Treadwell, in fact, was not his 40-yard dash time but a disappointing 33 1/2-inch (0.85 m) vertical jump, a half-inch better than he did in Indianapolis. He also completed the 20-yard shuttle in 4.30 seconds and the 3-cone drill in 7.04 seconds. Based on his combine and Pro Day numbers, among the 43 wide receivers that were evaluated in Indianapolis, Treadwell's 40-yard dash time would have placed him 28th. His twelve reps in the bench press was tied for 22nd within the group and his combine vertical jump tied for 23rd. His broad jump of 9 ft 9 in (2.97 m) ranked 12th and his campus numbers in the 20-yard shuttle and 3-cone drill would have placed 17th and 16th, respectively. After the workout, Treadwell stated: "I didn't run what I wanted to run, but it was fun. I'm proud of myself for what I did run most importantly. I'm just a playmaker, when I get into the game it's a different feel than the 40-yard dash."

External videos
- Treadwell's NFL Combine workout
- Treadwell's Pro Day workout
- Treadwell gets drafted by Minnesota

Pre-draft measurables
Height	Weight	Arm length	Hand span	Wingspan	40-yard dash	10-yard split	20-yard split	20-yard shuttle	Three-cone drill	Vertical jump	Broad jump	Bench press
6 ft 2 in (1.88 m)	221 lb (100 kg)	33 3/8 in (0.85 m)	9 1/2 in (0.24 m)	6 ft 8 1/2 in (2.04 m)	4.63 s	1.62 s	2.73 s	4.30 s	7.04 s	33.5 in (0.85 m)	9 ft 9 in (2.97 m)	12 reps
All values are from NFL Combine/Pro Day

=== Minnesota Vikings ===
"We all know Treadwell ran a 4.65 in the 40 at his pro day. So, either you believe in him and his game, or you don't. He's a natural hands catcher and will win 50–50 balls. He's also one of the best blocking wide receivers in this draft. He's physical, tough and has great hands. I think the Vikings got a winner."

— Mike Mayock, former NFL Network analyst and former general manager of the Oakland Raiders

==== 2016 season ====
Treadwell was selected as the 23rd overall pick by the Minnesota Vikings in the first round of the 2016 NFL draft. On April 29, 2016, it was announced that Treadwell, who wore No. 1 at Ole Miss, would wear No. 11 for the Vikings, a number that stayed ownerless after wide receiver Mike Wallace was released in March. In June 2016, after being selected by the Vikings, Treadwell created a minor controversy when he posted a photo of himself on social media wearing an Oakland Raiders baseball cap. On August 12, Treadwell made his first appearance as a Viking in a preseason game against the Cincinnati Bengals, catching a game-high four passes for 41 yards from backup quarterback Shaun Hill and third-stringer Joel Stave. On November 6, Treadwell caught his first career NFL pass, which was a 15-yard reception from quarterback Sam Bradford in the first quarter against their NFC North division rival Detroit Lions. Despite having high hopes following the draft, Treadwell's rookie year was limited as he only appeared in nine games and finished the season with the aforementioned reception for 15 yards.

==== 2017 season ====
In Week 2 against the Pittsburgh Steelers, Treadwell had three receptions for 33 yards. In the 2017 season, he recorded 20 receptions for 200 receiving yards.

==== 2018 season ====
In Week 2 against the Green Bay Packers, Treadwell scored his first professional touchdown in the 29–29 tie. In the 2018 season, Treadwell finished with 35 receptions for 302 receiving yards and one receiving touchdown in 15 games and seven starts.

==== 2019 season ====
On May 1, 2019, the Vikings declined the fifth-year option on Treadwell's contract, making him a free agent for the 2020 season. On August 31, he was waived by Minnesota as part of final roster cuts. The Vikings re-signed Treadwell on September 24 after Chad Beebe was placed on Injured Reserve. In Week 13 against the Seattle Seahawks on Monday Night Football, Treadwell caught one pass for a 58-yard touchdown during the 37–30 loss. This was Treadwell's first touchdown catch since Week 2 of the 2018 season He finished the 2019 season with nine receptions for 184 yards and a touchdown in 13 games and one start.

=== Atlanta Falcons ===
On March 25, 2020, Treadwell signed with the Atlanta Falcons. He was released on September 5 and re-signed to the practice squad on September 16. Treadwell was placed on the practice squad/COVID-19 list by the team on November 17, and promoted to the active roster on December 1. Although seeing limited action in only five games of the 2020 season, he made six receptions on seven total targets for 49 yards and scored a single-season career-high of two touchdowns.

=== Jacksonville Jaguars ===
On June 18, 2021, Treadwell signed with the Jacksonville Jaguars. He was released on August 31 by the Jaguars as part of final roster cuts and re-signed to the practice squad the following day. He was promoted to the active roster on November 6. Treadwell finished the 2021 season with 33 receptions for 434 receiving yards and one receiving touchdown in 12 games and seven starts.

On March 21, 2022, Treadwell re-signed with the Jaguars. He was released by Jacksonville on August 29 as part of preliminary roster cuts.

=== New England Patriots ===
On September 6, 2022, Treadwell was signed to the New England Patriots' practice squad. He was released by the Patriots on October 4.

=== Arizona Cardinals ===
On October 12, 2022, Treadwell was signed to the Arizona Cardinals' practice squad. He was released by Arizona on October 26.

=== Seattle Seahawks ===
On November 1, 2022, Treadwell was signed to the Seattle Seahawks' practice squad. He was promoted to the active roster on December 20. For the 2022 season, Treadwell appeared in six regular season games and one postseason game.

=== Baltimore Ravens ===
On June 5, 2023, Treadwell signed with the Baltimore Ravens. He was released by the Ravens on August 29 as part of final roster cuts and re-signed to the practice squad two days later. On September 30, Treadwell was elevated to the active roster. He was signed to the active roster on December 30, then released on January 15, 2024. Treadwell was re-signed to the practice squad shortly after, but was not signed to a reserve/future contract after the season and thus became a free agent when his practice squad contract expired.

=== Indianapolis Colts ===
On July 24, 2024, Treadwell signed with the Indianapolis Colts. He was released by the Colts on August 27 as part of final roster cuts and re-signed to the practice squad the following day. He signed a reserve/future contract on January 6, 2025. Treadwell played in two games with the Colts during the regular season, failing to record an offensive stat.

On August 26, 2025, Treadwell was released by the Colts as part of final roster cuts; he was re-signed to the team's practice squad two days later. He was promoted to the active roster on November 8.

On March 13, 2026, Treadwell re-signed with the Colts.

== Career statistics ==
=== NFL ===
Legend
**Bold**	Career high

==== Regular season ====
Season	Team	Games		Receiving					Fumbles	
Season	Team	GP	GS	Rec	Yds	Avg	Lng	TD	FUM	Lost
2016	MIN	9	1	1	15	15.0	15	0	0	0
2017	MIN	**16**	**7**	20	200	10.0	25	0	**1**	0
2018	MIN	15	**7**	**35**	302	8.6	22	1	0	0
2019	MIN	13	1	9	184	**20.4**	**58**	1	0	0
2020	ATL	5	0	6	49	8.2	14	**2**	0	0
2021	JAX	12	7	33	**434**	13.2	41	1	0	0
2022	SEA	6	0	6	42	7.0	17	0	0	0
2023	BAL	5	1	1	16	16.0	16	0	0	0
2024	IND	2	0	0	0	0	0	0	0	0
2025	IND	10	0	0	0	0	0	0	0	0
Career		93	24	111	1,242	11.2	58	5	1	0

==== Postseason ====
Season	Team	Games		Receiving					Fumbles	
Season	Team	GP	GS	Rec	Yds	Avg	Lng	TD	FUM	Lost
2017	MIN	**2**	0	0	0	0.0	0	0	0	0
2019	MIN	1	0	0	0	0.0	0	0	0	0
2022	SEA	1	0	0	0	0.0	0	0	0	0
Career		4	0	0	0	0.0	0	0	0	0

=== College ===
**Ole Miss Rebels**
Season	Receiving					Rushing					Passing						
Season	Rec	Yards	Avg	TD	Long	Att	Yards	Avg	TD	Long	Comp	Att	Yards	Pct.	TD	Int	Rtg
**2013**	72	936	8.4	5	38	3	2	0.7	0	7	1	4	19	25.0	0	1	14.9
**2014**	48	732	13.2	5	63	2	−7	−3.5	0	−3	0	0	0	0	0	0	0
**2015**	82	1,153	14.1	11	58	1	−5	−5.0	0	−5	3	3	134	100.0	1	0	585.2
Career	202	2,393	11.8	21	63	6	-10	-1.7	0	7	4	7	153	57.1	1	1	259.3

- Green indicates career high
