= Anthony Harris (safety) =

American football player (born 1991)

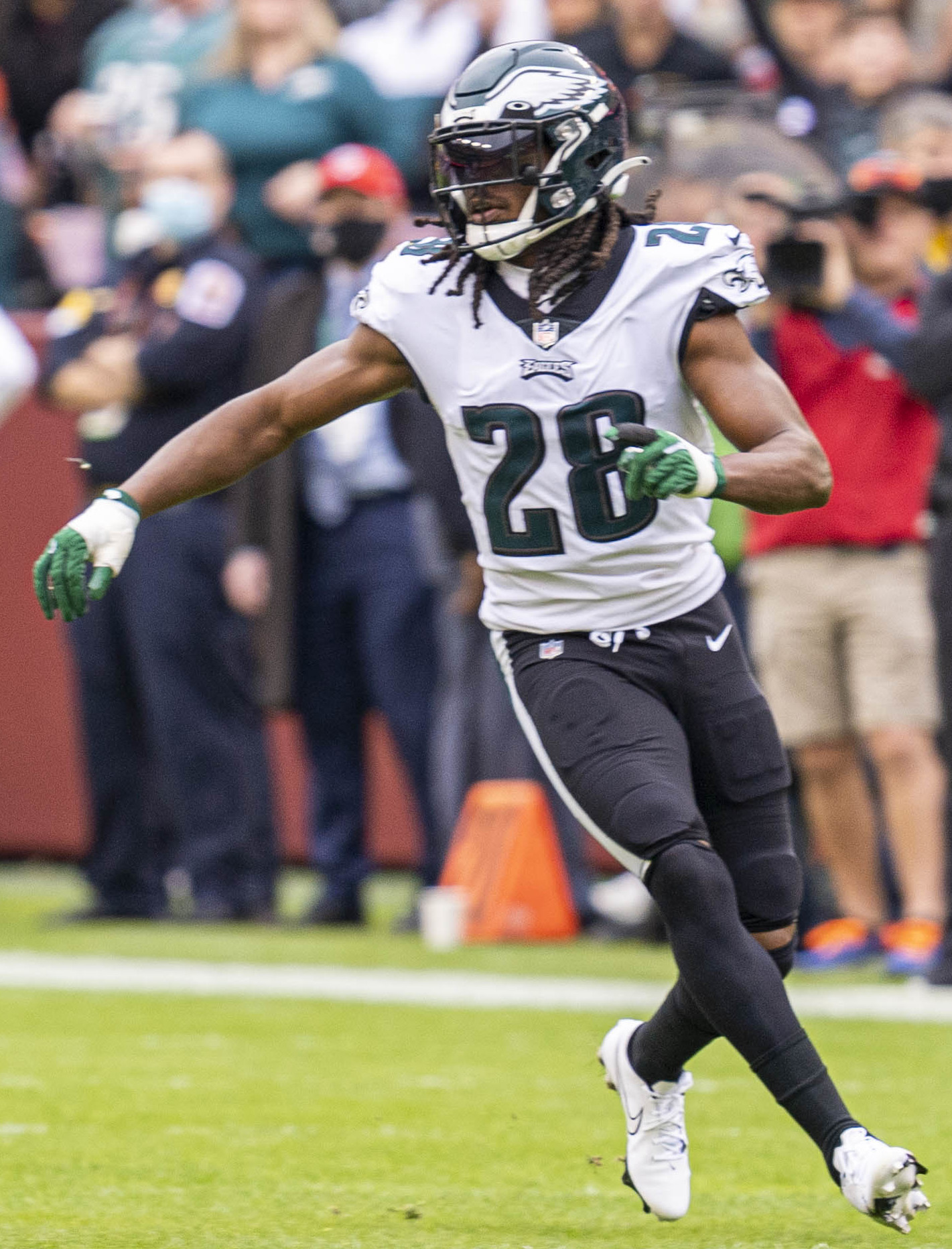
- Harris with the Philadelphia Eagles in 2022

No. 41, 28
- Position: Safety

Personal information
- Born: October 9, 1991 (age 35); Richmond, Virginia, U.S.
- Listed height: 6 ft 1 in (1.85 m)
- Listed weight: 202 lb (92 kg)

Career information
- High school: Lloyd C. Bird (Chesterfield, Virginia)
- College: Virginia (2011–2014)
- NFL draft: 2015: undrafted

Career history
- Minnesota Vikings (2015–2020); Philadelphia Eagles (2021); Denver Broncos (2022); Philadelphia Eagles (2022)

Awards and highlights
- NFL interceptions co-leader (2019); First-team All-American (2013); First-team All-ACC (2013)

Career NFL statistics
- Total tackles: 356
- Forced fumbles: 1
- Fumble recoveries: 4
- Pass deflections: 31
- Interceptions: 10
- Defensive touchdowns: 1
- Stats at Pro Football Reference

Anthony Harris (born October 9, 1991) is an American former professional football player who was a safety in the National Football League (NFL). He played college football for the Virginia Cavaliers, and was signed by the Minnesota Vikings of the National Football League (NFL) as an undrafted free agent in 2015. He played his first six seasons with Minnesota, and was the NFL interceptions co-leader in 2019.

== Early life ==
Harris attended Lloyd C. Bird High School in Chesterfield, Virginia, where he played quarterback, wide receiver and defensive back (two-time All-state and All-region selection). As a junior, he allowed only one completion and notched eight interceptions on defense, while also throwing for over 1,000 yards and rushing for 800 more yards from the quarterback spot on offense. In 2010, he was selected to the first-team All-Group AAA football team by the Associated Press (AP) and was named to the All-Dominion District first-team as a utility player and earned All-district second-team accolades at both quarterback and defensive back. Harris was also a starter on the Skyhawk basketball team as well.

Regarded as a three-star prospect according to both Rivals.com and Scout.com, Harris was ranked as the No. 34 athlete in the nation and No. 13 recruit in the state of Virginia by Rivals. He was ranked as the No. 68 wide receiver in the country by Scout. He also received a scouts grade of 72 from ESPN.com and was ranked the No. 201 athlete in nation. Harris committed to play college football at the University of Virginia on June 2, 2010, after being recruited by then head coach Jim Reid. He chose the Cavaliers over scholarship offers from Maryland, Richmond and West Virginia, among others.

== College career ==
Harris attended the University of Virginia, where he played for the Virginia Cavaliers football team from 2011 to 2014. He started 35 of the 49 games he played at Virginia. Harris ended his collegiate career with 289 tackles (145 solo and 6 for loss), 11 interceptions, 2 sacks, 2 forced fumbles and 19 passes defensed. His 11 interceptions tied him for No. 10 all-time in program history.

In his first season in 2011, Harris was one of 12 true freshmen to appear in games for the Cavaliers, playing in all 13 of Virginia's games. He appeared mostly on special teams and finished the season with 14 total tackles including a season-high three stops at North Carolina.

As a sophomore in 2012, Harris helped anchor the nation's youngest starting secondary, which featured 4 sophomores and 1 freshman. Harris recorded 87 total tackles (48 solo and 0.5 for loss), a forced fumble, an interception and was credited with 3 passes defensed. He was one of 11 Cavaliers to start all 12 games. He made his first career interception at NC State and returned it for 37 yards. He registered four games with double-digit tackles, with 11 against Penn State, 12 against Louisiana Tech, 10 at Duke and had a career-high 14 tackles against North Carolina. Against Louisiana Tech, he helped hold one of the nation's most prolific offenses to its lowest output of total yards (385 yards) on the season and only game the Bulldogs were held under 400 yards.

As a junior in 2013, Harris started 11 games for the Cavaliers, earned first-team All-Atlantic Coast Conference (ACC) honors and was an All-American by Sports Illustrated after leading the nation in interceptions with eight, the most by a Cavalier since Ronde Barber led the ACC with eight in 1994. Harris finished the season with 80 total tackles (42 solo and 3.5 for loss), one sack, a forced fumble, six passes defensed and eight interceptions, which placed Harris No. 2 all-time at Virginia for interceptions in a season, tied with Ronde Barber and Kevin Cook. He also blocked a key punt in the second half of Virginia's victory against BYU and was named the Walter Camp National Defensive Player of the Week for his efforts against the Cougars.

In his final season at Virginia in 2014, Harris was named 3rd-Team All-ACC. Harris notched a career-high 108 tackles (No. 5 in the ACC and No. 31 in the nation) along with two interceptions, a sack and ten passes defensed. He had eight tackles, broke up one pass and returned one interception for seven yards in Virginia's win against No. 21 Louisville to earn the first of his two ACC Defensive Back of the Week honors, with the second one coming in a win over Miami in which he recorded 10 tackles and broke up three passes. He had 13 tackles against Pitt, including one sack for a loss of 11 yards. He ended the year with seven tackles in the season finale at Virginia Tech.

== Professional career ==
=== Pre-draft ===
On December 1, 2014, it was announced that Harris had accepted his invitation to play in the 2015 Senior Bowl. Unfortunately, he was unable to participate after discovering he had sustained a torn labrum during his senior season that would require surgery. Harris attended the NFL Scouting Combine in Indianapolis, Indiana, but was limited to the 40-yard dash due to his injury. He had private visits with representatives from the Minnesota Vikings, New York Giants, and Detroit Lions. At the conclusion of the pre-draft process, Harris received a wide range of varying draft projections due to his shoulder injury. He was projected by NFL draft experts and scouts to possibly go as early as the second round or as late as the seventh. The majority of draft experts and scouts projected him to be a third or fourth round pick. He was ranked the fourth best safety prospect by NFL analyst Charles Davis, the fifth best safety by NFL analyst Bucky Brooks, and was ranked the ninth best free safety in the draft by NFLDraftScout.com.

Pre-draft measurables
Height	Weight	Arm length	Hand span	40-yard dash
6 ft 0 5/8 in (1.84 m)	183 lb (83 kg)	32 in (0.81 m)	9 1/4 in (0.23 m)	4.56 s
All values from NFL Combine

=== Minnesota Vikings ===
==== 2015 season ====
On May 2, 2015, the Minnesota Vikings signed Harris as an undrafted free agent after he was not one of the 15 safeties selected during the 2015 NFL draft. The Vikings signed him to a three-year, $1.58 million contract that includes a $10,000 signing bonus. Harris going undrafted surprised many scouts and analysts, due to the 2015 NFL draft being very thin at the safety position with only four true safeties being selected in the first two rounds. His fall in the draft was attributed to his shoulder injury and many reporting his recovery process could possibly extend into the beginning of the regular season. ESPN analyst Todd McShay listed Harris as the top undrafted free agent after the draft.

Throughout his first training camp, Harris competed against Andrew Sendejo, Antone Exum, and Robert Blanton for the starting strong safety position. On September 5, 2015, he was waived by the Minnesota Vikings, but was re-signed to the practice squad the following day.

On December 8, 2015, Harris was promoted to the active roster after spending the first 12 games on the practice squad. He was named the starting free safety, alongside cornerback Terrence Newman, after multiple injuries to safeties Harrison Smith, Sendejo, and Exum. On December 10, 2015, Harris made his first career start and professional regular season debut during a 23–20 loss to the Arizona Cardinals and led the team with eight combined tackles while also deflecting a deep pass attempt by Carson Palmer. The following game, he made his second consecutive start and collected five combined tackles and defended a pass in a 38–17 victory over the Chicago Bears. He finished his rookie season with 15 combined tackles (12 solo) and two pass deflections in four games and two starts.

The Vikings completed the 2015 season with an 11–5 record and finished atop the NFC North. On January 10, 2016, Harris appeared in his first career playoff game as the Vikings lost 10–9 to the Seattle Seahawks in the NFC Wild Card Round.

==== 2016 season ====
Harris entered training camp competing for a job as the backup safety against Michael Griffin, Exum, and Jayron Kearse. Head coach Mike Zimmer named Harris the backup free safety to Smith to begin the 2016 season.

On December 11, 2016, Harris started at free safety in place of an injured Smith who suffered a severe high ankle sprain. He recorded seven solo tackles in a 25–16 victory at the Jacksonville Jaguars. The next week, Harris collected a career-high 15 combined tackles and defended a pass as the Vikings were routed 34–6 by the Indianapolis Colts. On January 1, 2017, he started at strong safety in place of Sendejo who injured his knee during practice. Harris went on to make eight combined tackles in a 38–10 victory over the Bears. He finished the season with 30 combined tackles (11 solo) and a pass deflection and played in 16 games with three starts.

==== 2017 season ====
Harris began the 2017 regular season as the backup free safety to Smith. On October 15, 2017, against the Green Bay Packers, he started at strong safety after Sendejo was sidelined with a groin injury. He recorded two solo tackles in a 23–10 victory for Minnesota. Due to Sendejo being suspended for a Week 8 matchup against the Cleveland Browns in London, Harris got the start again and recovered a fumble by running back Isaiah Crowell in the third quarter. During a Week 11 matchup against the Los Angeles Rams, Harris recorded a season-high seven combined tackles after starting at strong safety with Sendejo inactive due to a groin and hamstring injury. Harris also deflected a pass, as the Vikings defeated the Rams 24–7.

==== 2018 season ====
On March 8, 2018, Harris re-signed with the Vikings. In Week 6 against the Cardinals, Harris recorded his first career interception off quarterback Josh Rosen in the 27–17 win. In Week 11 against the Bears, Harris intercepted Mitchell Trubisky twice in a 25–20 loss.

==== 2019 season ====
On March 11, 2019, the Vikings placed a second-round restricted free agent tender on Harris. Following the release of Sendejo, Harris was named a starting safety alongside Smith.

In Week 1 against the Atlanta Falcons, Harris intercepted Matt Ryan twice and recovered a fumble as the Vikings won 28–12. For his Week 1 effort, Harris was awarded NFC Defensive Player of the Week. In Week 8 against the Washington Redskins, Harris recorded his third interception of the season off Dwayne Haskins in the 19–9 win. On December 2, 2019, against the Seahawks, Harris intercepted Russell Wilson and returned it 20 yards for his first career touchdown in the 37–30 loss. Harris would record two more interceptions throughout the season, which came off Philip Rivers in a 39–10 win over the Los Angeles Chargers, and Aaron Rodgers in a 23–10 loss to the Packers. With six interceptions, Harris was tied for the NFL's most alongside New England's Stephon Gilmore and Buffalo's Tre'Davious White.

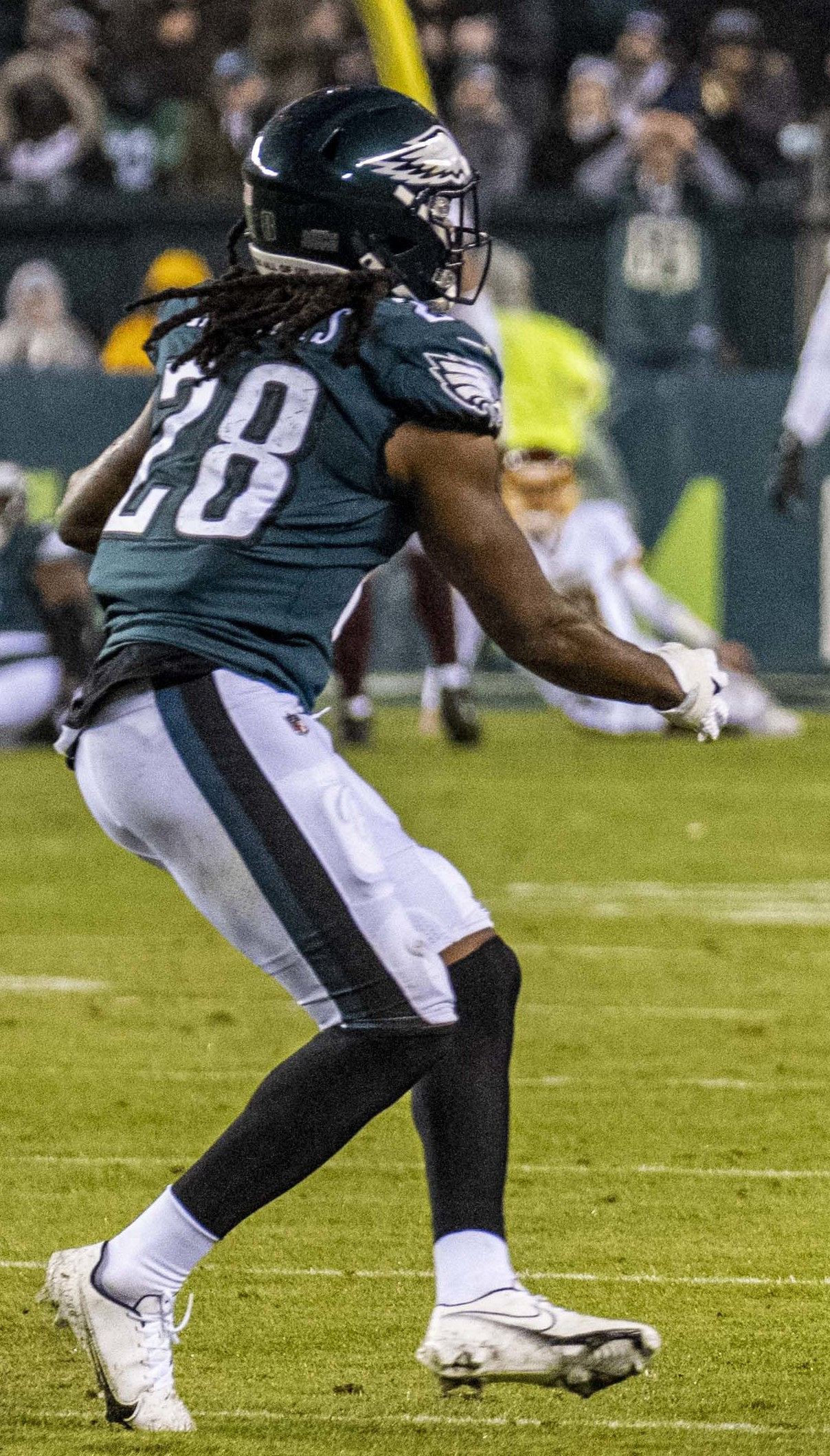
Harris with the Eagles in 2021

In the NFC Wild Card game against the New Orleans Saints, Harris intercepted a pass thrown by Drew Brees and returned it for 30 yards during the 26–20 overtime win.

==== 2020 season ====
On March 16, 2020, the Vikings placed the franchise tag on Harris. He signed his franchise tender on May 18, 2020.

=== Philadelphia Eagles (first stint) ===
Harris signed a one-year $5 million contract with the Philadelphia Eagles on March 20, 2021. In week 6, he caught his first and only interception of the season off a pass from Tom Brady during the 22–28 loss to the Tampa Bay Buccaneers.

On March 18, 2022, Harris signed a one-year contract to remain with the Eagles. He was released on August 30, 2022, after the Eagles traded for C. J. Gardner-Johnson, and was signed to the practice squad the next day. On September 5, the Eagles and Harris mutually agreed to terminate his practice squad contract to maximize Harris' flexibility to join other teams' active rosters.

=== Denver Broncos ===
On September 14, 2022, Harris was signed to the Denver Broncos practice squad. He was promoted to the active roster on November 8. He was released on December 6.

=== Philadelphia Eagles (second stint) ===
After having a free agent visit the day prior, Harris signed with the Eagles on December 13, 2022, following injuries to C. J. Gardner-Johnson and Reed Blankenship.

== Career statistics ==
=== NFL ===
==== Regular season ====
Year	Team	Games		Tackles					Interceptions						Fumbles		
Year	Team	GP	GS	Cmb	Solo	Ast	Sck	Sfty	PD	Int	Yds	Avg	Lng	TD	FF	FR	Yds
2015	MIN	4	2	16	13	3	0.0	—	2	0	0	0.0	0	0	0	0	0
2016	MIN	16	3	41	30	11	0.0	—	1	0	0	0.0	0	0	0	1	0
2017	MIN	16	3	18	16	2	0.0	—	1	0	0	0.0	0	0	1	2	0
2018	MIN	15	3	46	34	12	0.0	—	6	3	33	11.0	33	0	0	0	0
2019	MIN	14	14	58	35	23	0.0	—	11	6	42	7.0	20	1	0	1	0
2020	MIN	16	16	104	58	25	0.0	—	7	0	0	0.0	0	0	0	0	0
2021	PHI	14	14	72	36	36	0.0	—	3	1	2	2.0	0	0	0	0	0
Total		95	61	356	221	135	0.0	—	28	10	77	7.7	33	1	1	4	0

==== Postseason ====
Year	Team	Games		Tackles					Interceptions						Fumbles		
Year	Team	GP	GS	Cmb	Solo	Ast	Sck	Sfty	PD	Int	Yds	Avg	Lng	TD	FF	FR	Yds
2015	MIN	1	0	Special teams - no stats													
2018	MIN	2	0	11	8	3	0.0	—	0	0	0	0.0	0	0	0	0	0
2019	MIN	2	2	9	5	4	0.0	—	1	1	30	30.0	30	0	0	0	0
2021	PHI	1	1	13	7	6	0.0	—	0	0	0	0.0	0	0	0	0	0
Career		6	3	33	20	13	0.0	—	1	1	30	30.0	30	0	0	0	0

=== College ===
Season	Team	Games		Tackles					Interceptions						Fumbles		
Season	Team	GP	GS	Cmb	Solo	Ast	Sck	Sfty	PD	Int	Yds	Avg	Lng	TD	FF	FR	Yds
2011	Virginia	13	0	14	6	8	0.0	—	0	0	0	0.0	0	0	0	0	0
2012	Virginia	12	12	87	48	39	0.0	—	3	1	37	37.0	37	0	1	0	0
2013	Virginia	12	11	80	42	38	1.0	—	6	8	42	5.2	21	0	1	0	0
2014	Virginia	12	12	108	49	59	1.0	—	10	2	6	3.0	7	0	0	0	0
Totals		49	35	289	145	144	2.0	0	19	11	85	7.7	37	0	2	0	0
