= Roc Thomas =

American football player (born 1995)

No. 32
- Position: Running back

Personal information
- Born: September 2, 1995 (age 31); Oxford, Alabama, U.S.
- Listed height: 5 ft 11.5 in (1.82 m)
- Listed weight: 203 lb (92 kg)

Career information
- High school: Oxford
- College: Jacksonville State
- NFL draft: 2018: undrafted

Career history
- Minnesota Vikings (2018); Jacksonville Jaguars (2019)*; Calgary Stampeders (2020–2021)
- * Offseason or practice squad member only

Career NFL statistics
- Rushing attempts: 8
- Rushing yards: 30
- Receptions: 2
- Receiving yards: 21
- Return yards: 20
- Stats at Pro Football Reference

Roc Thomas (born September 2, 1995) is an American former professional football player who was a running back in the National Football League (NFL) and Canadian Football League (CFL). He played college football for the Auburn Tigers and Jacksonville State Gamecocks.

== Early life ==
Thomas attended and played high school football at Oxford High School.

== College career ==
Thomas attended and played college football at Auburn and later transferred to Jacksonville State.

== Professional career ==
=== Minnesota Vikings ===
Thomas signed with the Minnesota Vikings as an undrafted free agent on April 30, 2018. After making the initial 53-man roster, Thomas made his NFL debut in Week 4 against the Los Angeles Rams on Thursday Night Football. In the 38–31 loss, he had a four-yard rush. On November 7, the Vikings waived Thomas. He was re-signed to the practice squad the next day. Thomas signed a reserve/future contract with the Vikings on January 2, 2019. Overall, Thomas finished his rookie season with eight carries for 30 rushing yards to go along with two receptions for 21 receiving yards.

Thomas was suspended the first three games of the 2019 season for a violation of the league's substance abuse policy. Days after the suspension announcement, the Vikings waived Thomas on July 22, 2019.

=== Jacksonville Jaguars ===
On August 4, 2019, Thomas was signed by the Jacksonville Jaguars, but was waived/injured six days later and placed on injured reserve. He was waived with an injury settlement on August 26.

Thomas was reinstated from suspension on September 24, 2019.

=== Calgary Stampeders ===
Thomas signed with the Calgary Stampeders on February 14, 2020.
