= Chad Beebe =

American football player (born 1994)

No. 12
- Position: Wide receiver

Personal information
- Born: June 1, 1994 (age 32); Buffalo, New York, U.S.
- Listed height: 5 ft 10 in (1.78 m)
- Listed weight: 183 lb (83 kg)

Career information
- High school: Aurora Christian (Aurora, Illinois)
- College: Northern Illinois (2013–2017)
- NFL draft: 2018: undrafted

Career history
- Minnesota Vikings (2018–2021); Houston Texans (2022)*
- * Offseason or practice squad member only

Career NFL statistics
- Receptions: 26
- Receiving yards: 310
- Receiving touchdowns: 2
- Return yards: 120
- Stats at Pro Football Reference

Chad Beebe (born June 1, 1994) is an American former professional football player who was a wide receiver in the National Football League (NFL). He played college football for the Northern Illinois Huskies, and was signed to the Minnesota Vikings following the 2018 NFL draft.

== Early life ==
Born in Buffalo, New York, Beebe attended Aurora Christian Schools, where he played football for his father Don Beebe. Beebe holds school records for most catches and receiving yardage in a career and set a school single-game record with four touchdowns. In his senior season, Beebe caught 65 passes for 980 yards and 15 touchdowns and earned IHSA All-State honors as the Eagles won the 2012 Illinois Class 3A title.

== College career ==
Beebe spent five seasons with the Northern Illinois Huskies, redshirting his senior season due to an offseason injury. Over the course of his collegiate career, Beebe had 64 receptions for 930 yards and three touchdowns while also returning 48 punts and 12 kickoffs for 329 and 297 yards respectively. He wore 82, his father's number from the NFL, while at Northern Illinois.

== Professional career ==
Pre-draft measurables
Height	Weight	Arm length	Hand span	40-yard dash	10-yard split	20-yard split	20-yard shuttle	Three-cone drill	Vertical jump	Broad jump
5 ft 9 5/8 in (1.77 m)	178 lb (81 kg)	27 7/8 in (0.71 m)	9 1/8 in (0.23 m)	4.68 s	1.60 s	2.59 s	4.18 s	6.88 s	32.5 in (0.83 m)	9 ft 9 in (2.97 m)
All values from Pro Day

=== Minnesota Vikings ===
On May 7, 2018, Beebe signed with the Minnesota Vikings as an undrafted free agent after participating in a rookie minicamp with the team. He was cut by the Vikings at the end of training camp and subsequently signed to the team's practice squad on September 2. On November 3, Beebe was promoted to the Vikings' active roster after an injury to wide receiver Stefon Diggs. He made his NFL debut the following day in a 24–9 win against the Detroit Lions, catching three passes for 21 yards. As a rookie, Beebe played in three games with four receptions for 39 yards and missed five games due to a hamstring injury.

On September 24, 2019, Beebe was placed on injured reserve after suffering torn ligaments in his ankle. In the 2019 season, Beebe caught two passes for 70 yards, returned one kickoff for 13 yards and returned seven punts for 46 yards with three fumbles in three games played.

In Week 12 of the 2020 season, Beebe scored a late go-ahead touchdown, which was also the first of his career, on a ten-yard reception from Kirk Cousins to secure a 28–27 victory over the Carolina Panthers, overcoming a muffed punt minutes earlier that had set up a Panthers field goal. Beebe scored a touchdown on a 40-yard catch and run from Cousins in the final game of the season against the Detroit Lions. He finished the season with 20 receptions for 201 yards and two touchdowns, and nine punts returned for 42 yards.

The Vikings initially declined to tender Beebe after the 2020 season, making a free agent, but quickly re-signed him to a one-year contract on March 17, 2021. Beebe was waived/injured by the Vikings on August 31 and placed on injured reserve.

=== Houston Texans ===
On June 10, 2022, Beebe signed with the Houston Texans. He was released on August 15 as part of preliminary roster cuts.

== Personal life ==
Beebe is the son of former NFL wide receiver Don Beebe, who played nine years for the Buffalo Bills, Green Bay Packers, and Carolina Panthers and appeared in six Super Bowls.

Like his father, Beebe is a Christian.
