= 2016 Minnesota Vikings season =

56th season in franchise history

- Owner: Zygi Wilf
- General manager: Rick Spielman
- Head coach: Mike Zimmer (games 1–12, 14–16); Mike Priefer (interim, game 13)
- Home stadium: U.S. Bank Stadium

Results
- Record: 8–8
- Division place: 3rd NFC North
- Playoffs: Did not qualify
- All-Pros: 1: KR Cordarrelle Patterson (1st team)
- Pro Bowlers: 6: DE Everson Griffen; DT Linval Joseph; OLB Anthony Barr; CB Xavier Rhodes; FS Harrison Smith; RS Cordarrelle Patterson

Uniform
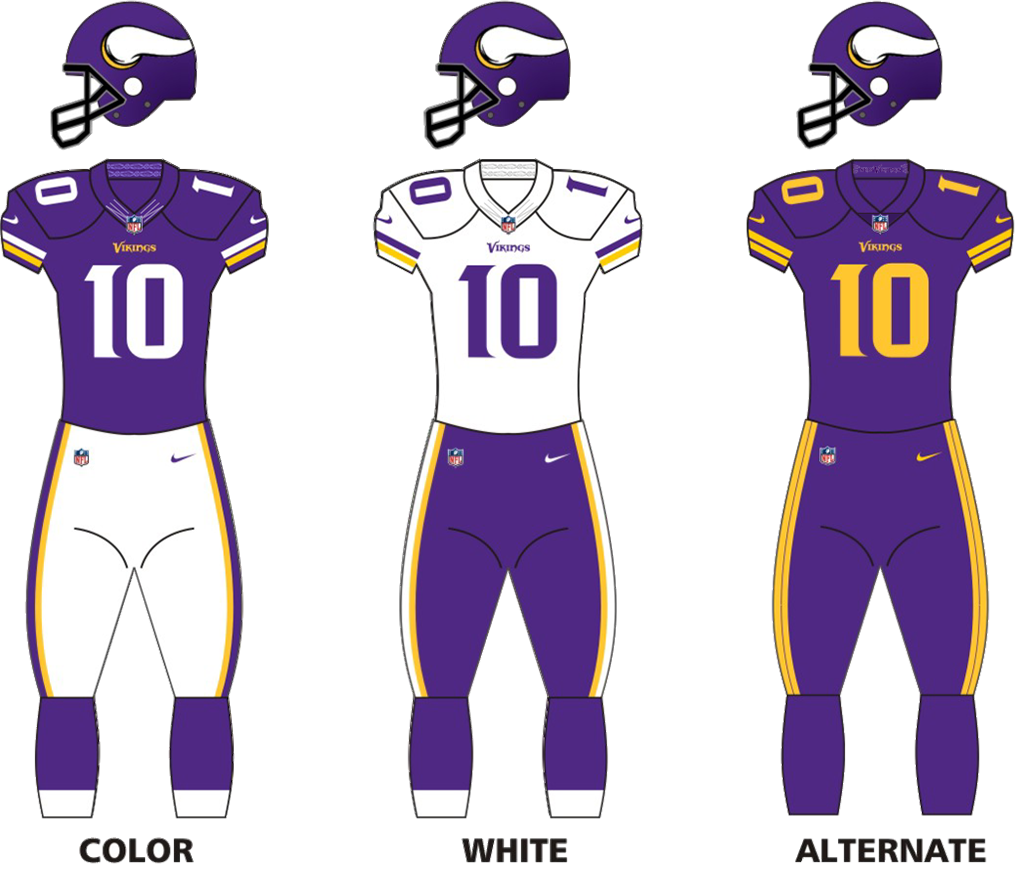

The 2016 season was the Minnesota Vikings' 56th in the National Football League (NFL) and their third under head coach Mike Zimmer. After starting the season with five consecutive wins prior to their bye week, the Vikings managed just three victories after the bye and were eliminated from playoff contention in Week 16 with a 38–25 road loss to the Packers. They joined the 1978 Redskins, 1993 Saints, 2003 Vikings, 2009 Broncos, 2009 Giants and 2015 Falcons in missing the playoffs after starting 5–0 or better. The Vikings are the only NFL team to have more than once started 5–0 or better and missed the playoffs.

The team's new stadium, U.S. Bank Stadium in Minneapolis, opened at the start of the season, with a regular season debut victory on September 18 against division rival Green Bay on NBC Sunday Night Football. It was built on the site of the Hubert H. Humphrey Metrodome, the team's home from 1982 through 2013. The Vikings played at the outdoor TCF Bank Stadium at the University of Minnesota in 2014 and 2015. This would be the season the Vikings introduced their color rush jersey, the Minnesota Vikings debuted the Jerseys at home against Dallas.

On August 30, starting quarterback Teddy Bridgewater suffered a season-ending ACL tear and dislocated knee on a non-contact play during team practice. Originally, it was reported that Bridgewater's injury would keep him out for around a year and a half, and on January 27, 2017, it was reported that it was possible he could also miss the entire 2017 season. The extent of Bridgewater's injury prompted the Vikings to make a trade with the Philadelphia Eagles for former number 1 draft pick Sam Bradford, giving up a first-round pick in the 2017 NFL draft and a conditional fourth-round pick in the 2018 Draft in exchange. Adrian Peterson's season was also hit by injury after he tore the meniscus in his right knee in the home opener against the Packers. On September 22, Peterson underwent successful surgery to repair the meniscus. It was also revealed that the knee had a mild LCL sprain, but it did not need surgery. He was placed on injured reserve on September 23, 2016, and reactivated on December 17, but only made six rushing attempts before leaving the game, ending his season. Peterson left the team at the end of the season, ending his 10-year tenure with the Vikings.

== Offseason ==
=== 2016 draft ===
2016 Minnesota Vikings draft
Draft order		Player name	Position	College	Contract	Notes
Round	Selection	Player name	Position	College	Contract	Notes
1	23	Laquon Treadwell	WR	Ole Miss	4 years / $9.93 million	
2	54	Mackensie Alexander	CB	Clemson	4 years / $4.3 million	
3	86	Traded to the Miami Dolphins (Note: The Vikings traded their third-round selection (86th overall) to the Miami Dolphins in exchange for Miami's sixth-round selection (186th overall) and 2017 third- and fourth-round selections.)				
4	121	Willie Beavers	G	Western Michigan	4 years / $2.88 million	
5	160	Kentrell Brothers	LB	Missouri	4 years / $2.57 million	
6	180	Moritz Böhringer	WR	None (Note: He played for the Schwäbisch Hall of the German Football League (GFL).)	4 years / $2.49 million	from 49ers (Note: The Vikings traded linebacker Gerald Hodges to the San Francisco 49ers in exchange for San Francisco's sixth-round selection (180th) and center Nick Easton.)
6	186	Traded to the Miami Dolphins (Note: The Vikings traded the sixth-round selection they acquired from the Miami Dolphins (186th overall) back to the Dolphins in exchange for Miami's sixth-round selection and the seventh-round selection they acquired from the Ravens (196th and 227th overall).)				from Dolphins
6	188	David Morgan II	TE	UTSA	4 years / $2.47 million	from Eagles (Note: The Vikings traded the sixth-round selection they acquired from Miami and their seventh-round selection (196th and 240th overall) to the Philadelphia Eagles in exchange for Philadelphia's sixth-round selection (188th overall).)
6	196	Traded to the Philadelphia Eagles				from Texans via Patriots and Dolphins
6	198	Traded to the San Diego Chargers (Note: The Vikings traded their sixth-round selection (198th overall) to the San Diego Chargers in exchange for guard Jeremiah Sirles.)				
7	227	Stephen Weatherly	LB	Vanderbilt	4 years / $2.42 million	from Ravens via Dolphins
7	240	Traded to the Philadelphia Eagles				from Bills (Note: The Vikings traded their 2015 sixth-round selection (187th overall) and quarterback Matt Cassel to the Buffalo Bills in exchange for Buffalo's 2016 sixth-round selection (240th overall) and a 2015 fifth-round selection (137th overall).)
7	244	Jayron Kearse	S	Clemson	4 years / $2.4 million	

Draft trades

=== Roster changes ===
Re-signings
Date	Player name	Position	Contract terms
March 7, 2016	Andrew Sendejo	S	4 years / $16 million
March 7, 2016	Adam Thielen	WR	1 year / $600,000
March 8, 2016	Audie Cole	LB	1 year / $760,000
March 9, 2016	Mike Harris	G	1 year / $1.9 million
March 15, 2016	Rhett Ellison	TE	1 year / $2.25 million
March 15, 2016	Marcus Sherels	CB	2 years / $4 million
March 16, 2016	Matt Asiata	RB	1 year / $840,000
March 18, 2016	Terence Newman	CB	1 year / $3 million
March 18, 2016	Justin Trattou	DE	1 year / $810,000
April 11, 2016	Chad Greenway	LB	1 year / $2.75 million
April 18, 2016	Zach Line	FB	1 year / $1.671 million
September 9, 2016	Joe Berger	C	1-year extension

Departures
Date	Player name	Position	Note	New team
March 8, 2016	Mike Wallace	WR	Released	Baltimore Ravens
March 8, 2016	Austin Wentworth	OT	Waived	Retired
March 9, 2016	Casey Matthews	ILB	UFA	
March 9, 2016	Jason Trusnik	ILB	UFA	
March 14, 2016	Josh Robinson	CB	UFA	Tampa Bay Buccaneers
March 18, 2016	Robert Blanton	S	UFA	Buffalo Bills
April 13, 2016	Alex Singleton	LB	Waived	Calgary Stampeders (CFL)
May 10, 2016	Johnny Lowdermilk	S	Waived	Tampa Bay Buccaneers
July 25, 2016	Phil Loadholt	OT	Waived	Retired
August 25, 2016	Melvin White	CB	Waived	
August 30, 2016	Brad Sorensen	QB	Waived	
August 30, 2016	Terrell Sinkfield	WR	Waived	
August 30, 2016	Austin Shepherd	OT	Waived	
August 30, 2016	John Sullivan	C	Waived	
August 30, 2016	Scott Crichton	DL	Waived	
August 30, 2016	Antone Exum	S	Waived	
August 30, 2016	Zach Moore	DE	Waived	
September 3, 2016	C. J. Ham	HB	Waived	
September 3, 2016	Blake Renaud	FB	Waived	
September 3, 2016	Isaac Fruechte	WR	Waived	
September 3, 2016	Moritz Böhringer	WR	Waived	
September 3, 2016	Willie Beavers	OL	Waived	
September 3, 2016	Isame Faciane	OG	Waived	
September 3, 2016	Stephen Weatherly	DE	Waived	
September 3, 2016	Toby Johnson	DT	Waived	
September 3, 2016	Brandon Watts	OLB	Waived	

Additions
Date	Player name	Position	Previous team	Contract terms
March 10, 2016	Alex Boone	G	San Francisco 49ers	4 years / $26.8 million
March 10, 2016	Emmanuel Lamur	LB	Cincinnati Bengals	2 years / $6 million
March 18, 2016	Andre Smith	OT	Cincinnati Bengals	1 year / $4.5 million
May 10, 2016	C. J. Ham	HB	Augustana (NCAA)	
August 1, 2016	Terrance Plummer	LB	Minnesota Vikings	
September 3, 2016	Sam Bradford	QB	Philadelphia Eagles	Trade
September 4, 2016	Joel Stave	QB	Wisconsin (NCAA)	Practice squad
September 4, 2016	C. J. Ham	HB	Augustana (NCAA)	Practice squad
September 4, 2016	Moritz Böhringer	WR	Schwäbisch Hall (GFL)	Practice squad
September 4, 2016	Kyle Carter	TE	Penn State (NCAA)	Practice squad
September 4, 2016	Willie Beavers	OL	Western Michigan (NCAA)	Practice squad
September 4, 2016	Isame Faciane	OG	Minnesota Vikings	Practice squad
September 4, 2016	Stephen Weatherly	DE	Vanderbilt (NCAA)	Practice squad
September 4, 2016	Toby Johnson	DT	Minnesota Vikings	Practice squad
September 4, 2016	Tre Roberson	CB	Illinois State (NCAA)	Practice squad
September 4, 2016	Shamiel Gary	S	Miami Dolphins	Practice squad
September 13, 2016	Tre Roberson	CB	Illinois State (NCAA)	Practice squad
September 13, 2016	Julian Wilson	CB	Philadelphia Eagles	Practice squad
September 23, 2016	Ronnie Hillman	HB	Denver Broncos	
October 11, 2016	Jake Long	OT	Atlanta Falcons	1 year

Signed and released players
Date signed	Player name	Position	Previous team	Contract terms	Date released
March 7, 2016	Carter Bykowski	OT	Minnesota Vikings	1 year / $600,000	August 30, 2016
March 9, 2016	Kenrick Ellis	DT	Minnesota Vikings	1 year / $810,000	September 3, 2016
March 11, 2016	Travis Lewis	LB	Detroit Lions	1 year / $810,000	June 16, 2016
March 14, 2016	Michael Griffin	S	Tennessee Titans	1 year / $3 million	September 3, 2016
March 21, 2016	Brian Leonhardt	TE	San Francisco 49ers	1 year / $600,000	August 30, 2016
May 1, 2016	Keith Baxter	CB	Marshall (NCAA)	Undrafted FA	July 31, 2016
May 1, 2016	Kyle Carter	TE	Penn State (NCAA)	Undrafted FA	September 3, 2016
May 1, 2016	Joel Stave	QB	Wisconsin (NCAA)	Undrafted FA	September 3, 2016
May 1, 2016	Theiren Cockran	DE	Minnesota (NCAA)	Undrafted FA	August 30, 2016
May 1, 2016	Jake Ganus	ILB	Georgia (NCAA)	Undrafted FA	September 3, 2016
May 1, 2016	Marken Michel	WR	UMass (NCAA)	Undrafted FA	August 30, 2016
May 1, 2016	Denzell Perine	OLB	Florida Atlantic (NCAA)	Undrafted FA	September 2, 2016
May 1, 2016	Jhurell Pressley	RB	New Mexico (NCAA)	Undrafted FA	September 3, 2016
May 1, 2016	Brandon Ross	RB	Maryland (NCAA)	Undrafted FA	May 23, 2016
May 9, 2016	Tre Roberson	CB	Illinois State (NCAA)	Undrafted FA	September 13, 2016
May 9, 2016	Troy Stoudermire	WR	Winnipeg Blue Bombers (CFL)		August 30, 2016
May 23, 2016	Travis Raciti	DT	Philadelphia Eagles		September 2, 2016
May 31, 2016	Bruce Gaston	DT	Chicago Bears		June 16, 2016
July 27, 2016	Sean Hickey	OT	New York Jets		August 30, 2016
July 27, 2016	Jason Whittingham	LB	Utah (NCAA)		July 31, 2016
July 30, 2016	Claudell Louis	DT	Buffalo Bills		August 30, 2016
April 13, 2016	Terrance Plummer	LB	Minnesota Vikings		August 31, 2016
August 20, 2016	Kevin Monangai	RB	Philadelphia Eagles	Waived	August 4, 2016
August 20, 2016	Brad Sorensen	QB	San Diego Chargers		August 30, 2016
August 31, 2016	Brad Sorensen	QB	Minnesota Vikings		September 2, 2016
September 6, 2016	Carter Bykowski	OT	Minnesota Vikings	Practice squad	September 13, 2016

== Staff ==
2016 Minnesota Vikings staff
Front office: Owner/chairman – Zygi Wilf; Owner/president – Mark Wilf; Owner/vice chairman – Leonard Wilf; General manager – Rick Spielman; Executive vice president – Football Operations – Rob Brzezinski; Assistant general manager – George Paton; Director of college scouting – Jamaal Stephenson; Director of pro scouting – Ryan Monnens; Head coaches: Head coach – Mike Zimmer; Offensive coaches: Offensive Coordinator (through week 8) – Norv Turner; Quarterbacks – Scott Turner; Running backs – Kevin Stefanski; Wide receivers – George Stewart; Assistant wide receivers – Drew Petzing; Offensive Coordinator (weeks 9-17)/tight ends – Pat Shurmur; Offensive line – Tony Sparano; Assistant offensive line – Hank Fraley; Offensive quality control – Andrew Janocko	Defensive coaches: Defensive coordinator – George Edwards; Defensive line – Andre Patterson; Assistant defensive line – Robert Rodriguez; Linebackers – Adam Zimmer; Defensive backs – Jerry Gray; Assistant defensive backs/defensive quality control – Jonathan Gannon; Defensive assistant – Jeff Howard; Special teams coaches: Special teams coordinator – Mike Priefer; Assistant special teams – Ryan Ficken; Strength and conditioning: Head athletic trainer – Eric Sugarman; Head strength and conditioning – Brent Salazar; Assistant strength and conditioning – Jeff Hurd; Assistant strength and conditioning – Chaz Mahle

== Roster ==
2016 Minnesota Vikings roster
Quarterbacks (QB): 8 Sam Bradford; 6 Taylor Heinicke; 13 Shaun Hill; Running backs (RB): 44 Matt Asiata; 30 C. J. Ham; 48 Zach Line FB; 21 Jerick McKinnon; 28 Adrian Peterson; Wide receivers (WR): 14 Stefon Diggs; 15 Isaac Fruechte; 12 Charles Johnson; 84 Cordarrelle Patterson; 19 Adam Thielen; 11 Laquon Treadwell; 17 Jarius Wright; Tight ends (TE): 85 Rhett Ellison; 89 David Morgan; 82 Kyle Rudolph	Offensive linemen (OL): 64 Willie Beavers G; 61 Joe Berger C/G; 76 Alex Boone G; 68 T. J. Clemmings T; 62 Nick Easton C; 63 Brandon Fusco G; 69 Rashod Hill T; 67 Zac Kerin G; 78 Jeremiah Sirles T; Defensive linemen (DL): 97 Everson Griffen DE; 99 Danielle Hunter DE; 90 Toby Johnson DT; 98 Linval Joseph DT; 96 Brian Robison DE; 93 Shamar Stephen DT; 94 Justin Trattou DE; 91 Stephen Weatherly DE	Linebackers (LB): 55 Anthony Barr OLB; 40 Kentrell Brothers MLB; 57 Audie Cole MLB; 52 Chad Greenway OLB; 54 Eric Kendricks MLB; 59 Emmanuel Lamur OLB; 51 Edmond Robinson OLB; Defensive backs (DB): 41 Anthony Harris S; 27 Jayron Kearse SS; 24 Captain Munnerlyn CB; 23 Terence Newman CB; 29 Xavier Rhodes CB; 35 Marcus Sherels CB; 22 Harrison Smith FS; 26 Trae Waynes CB; Special teams (ST): 2 Kai Forbath K; 18 Jeff Locke P; 47 Kevin McDermott LS	Practice squad: 60 Sterling Bailey DE; 81 Moritz Böhringer WR (IPP); 86 Kyle Carter TE; 16 Cayleb Jones WR; 65 Marquis Lucas T; 36 Tre Roberson CB; 43 Bishop Sankey RB; 74 Austin Shepherd T; 31 Cedric Thompson FS; Reserve: 20 Mackensie Alexander CB (IR); 5 Teddy Bridgewater QB (IR); 95 Scott Crichton DT (IR); 90 B. J. Dubose DE (IR); 32 Antone Exum FS (IR); 73 Sharrif Floyd DT (IR); 79 Michael Harris G (NF-Ill.); 92 Tom Johnson DT (IR); 75 Matt Kalil T (IR); 72 Jake Long T (IR); 25 Jabari Price CB (IR); 34 Andrew Sendejo SS (IR); 71 Andre Smith T (IR); Rookies in italics 53 active, 13 reserve, 9 practice squad

== Pro Bowl ==
Five Vikings were selected for the 2017 Pro Bowl: defensive end Everson Griffen, defensive tackle Linval Joseph, return specialist Cordarrelle Patterson, cornerback Xavier Rhodes and free safety Harrison Smith. Rhodes played in his first Pro Bowl, while Griffen, Patterson and Smith participated in their second; Patterson was the first return specialist in Vikings history to go to two Pro Bowls. Linval Joseph replaced Rams defensive tackle Aaron Donald.

== Preseason ==
=== Schedule ===
The Vikings' preseason opponents and schedule were announced on April 7, 2016.

Week	Date	Opponent	Result	Record	Venue	Attendance	NFL.com recap
1	August 12	at Cincinnati Bengals	W 17–16	1–0	Paul Brown Stadium	50,737	Recap
2	August 18	at Seattle Seahawks	W 18–11	2–0	CenturyLink Field	68,469	Recap
3	August 28	San Diego Chargers	W 23–10	3–0	U.S. Bank Stadium	66,143	Recap
4	September 1	Los Angeles Rams	W 27–25	4–0	U.S. Bank Stadium	66,262	Recap

=== Game summaries ===
==== Week 1: at Cincinnati Bengals ====
Week 1: Minnesota Vikings at Cincinnati Bengals – Game summary

Quarter	1	2	3	4	Total
Vikings	0	10	7	0	17
Bengals	0	7	0	9	16

at Paul Brown Stadium, Cincinnati, Ohio

- Date: August 12
- Game time: 7:30 p.m. EDT/6:30 p.m. CDT
- Game weather: Cloudy, 86 °F (30 °C)
- Game attendance: 50,737
- Referee: Jerome Boger (23)
- Recap, Game Book

Game information

First quarter

- No scoring plays

Second quarter

- MIN – Charles Johnson 49-yard pass from Teddy Bridgewater (Blair Walsh kick), 5:43. Vikings 7–0. Drive: 10 plays, 96 yards, 6:39.
- CIN – Alex Erickson 3-yard pass from A. J. McCarron (Mike Nugent kick), 0:47. Tied 7–7. Drive: 5 plays, 54 yards, 1:26.
- MIN – Blair Walsh 51-yard field goal, 0:00. Vikings 10–7. Drive: 5 plays, 42 yards, 0:47.

Third quarter

- MIN – C. J. Ham 10-yard run (Blair Walsh kick), 1:44. Vikings 17–7. Drive: 10 plays, 74 yards, 5:46.

Fourth quarter

- CIN – Mike Nugent 23-yard field goal, 4:11. Vikings 17–10. Drive: 8 plays, 81 yards, 3:47.
- CIN – Alex Erickson 80-yard punt return (pass failed), 2:45. Vikings 17–16.

Top passers

- MIN – Teddy Bridgewater – 6/7, 92 yards, TD
- CIN – A. J. McCarron – 11/16, 125 yards, TD

Top rushers

- MIN – C. J. Ham – 12 rushes, 35 yards, TD
- CIN – Giovani Bernard – 7 rushes, 21 yards

Top receivers

- MIN – Charles Johnson – 1 reception, 49 yards, TD
- CIN – Rashaun Simonise – 1 reception, 47 yards

==== Week 2: at Seattle Seahawks ====
Week 2: Minnesota Vikings at Seattle Seahawks – Game summary

Quarter	1	2	3	4	Total
Vikings	0	11	0	7	18
Seahawks	0	0	0	11	11

at CenturyLink Field, Seattle, Washington

- Date: August 18
- Game time: 9:00 p.m. CDT/7:00 p.m. PDT
- Game weather: Sunny, 83 °F (28 °C)
- Game attendance: 68,469
- Referee: Ed Hochuli (85)
- Recap, Game Book

Game information

First quarter

- No scoring plays

Second quarter

- MIN – Jerick McKinnon 1-yard run (Shaun Hill–Matt Asiata pass), 2:20. Vikings 8–0. Drive: 8 plays, 77 yards, 4:08.
- MIN – Blair Walsh 27-yard field goal, 0:00. Vikings 11–0. Drive: 9 plays, 69 yards, 1:09.

Third quarter

- No scoring plays

Fourth quarter

- SEA – Troymaine Pope 4-yard run (Trevone Boykin run), 12:49. Vikings 11–8. Drive: 7 plays, 65 yards, 3:13.
- SEA – Steven Hauschka 49-yard field goal, 5:46. Tied 11–11. Drive: 13 plays, 58 yards, 5:50.
- MIN – Marcus Sherels 53-yard interception return (Blair Walsh kick), 1:23. Vikings 18–11.

Top passers

- MIN – Shaun Hill – 10/17, 129 yards
- SEA – Trevone Boykin – 10/20, 127 yards, INT

Top rushers

- MIN – Jhurell Pressley – 6 rushes, 28 yards
- SEA – Troymaine Pope – 10 rushes, 86 yards, TD

Top receivers

- MIN – Adam Thielen – 4 receptions, 61 yards
- SEA – Antwan Goodley – 5 receptions, 65 yards

==== Week 3: vs. San Diego Chargers ====
Week 3: San Diego Chargers at Minnesota Vikings – Game summary

Quarter	1	2	3	4	Total
Chargers	0	10	0	0	10
Vikings	6	6	8	3	23

at U.S. Bank Stadium, Minneapolis, Minnesota

- Date: August 28
- Game time: 12:00 p.m. CDT
- Game weather: None (indoor stadium)
- Game attendance: 66,143
- Referee: John Hussey (35)
- TV announcers (Fox): Kevin Burkhardt, John Lynch and Pam Oliver
- Recap, Game Book

Game information

First quarter

- MIN – Blair Walsh 23-yard field goal, 11:04. Vikings 3–0. Drive: 8 plays, 68 yards, 3:56.
- MIN – Blair Walsh 33-yard field goal, 4:18. Vikings 6–0. Drive: 9 plays, 29 yards, 4:38.

Second quarter

- SD – Melvin Gordon 39-yard run (Josh Lambo kick), 9:04. Chargers 7–6. Drive: 6 plays, 72 yards, 3:05.
- SD – Josh Lambo 32-yard field goal, 2:28. Chargers 10–6. Drive: 8 plays, 41 yards, 4:10.
- MIN – Kyle Rudolph 27-yard pass from Teddy Bridgewater (run failed), 1:18. Vikings 12–10. Drive: 6 plays, 78 yards, 1:10.

Third quarter

- MIN – Cordarrelle Patterson fumble recovery in the end zone (Shaun Hill–Laquon Treadwell pass), 13:12. Vikings 20–10. Drive: 2 plays, 17 yards, 0:43.

Fourth quarter

- MIN – Blair Walsh 23-yard field goal, 6:24. Vikings 23–10. Drive: 9 plays, 33 yards, 4:42.

Top passers

- SD – Kellen Clemens – 9/15, 77 yards
- MIN – Teddy Bridgewater – 12/16, 161 yards, TD

Top rushers

- SD – Melvin Gordon – 4 rushes, 51 yards, TD
- MIN – Jerick McKinnon – 8 rushes, 56 yards

Top receivers

- SD – Rasheed Bailey – 2 receptions, 37 yards
- MIN – Stefon Diggs – 5 receptions, 71 yards

==== Week 4: vs. Los Angeles Rams ====
Week 4: Los Angeles Rams at Minnesota Vikings – Game summary

Quarter	1	2	3	4	Total
Rams	7	0	3	15	25
Vikings	0	13	7	7	27

at U.S. Bank Stadium, Minneapolis, Minnesota

- Date: September 1
- Game time: 7:00 p.m. CDT
- Game weather: None (indoor stadium)
- Game attendance: 66,262
- Referee: Bill Vinovich (52)
- Recap, Game Book

Game information

First quarter

- LA – Kenny Britt 1-yard pass from Jared Goff (Greg Zuerlein kick), 11:37. Rams 7–0. Drive: 7 plays, 62 yards, 3:23.

Second quarter

- MIN – Blair Walsh 30-yard field goal, 2:39. Rams 7–3. Drive: 4 plays, 7 yards, 1:19.
- MIN – Blair Walsh 34-yard field goal, 0:55. Rams 7–6. Drive: 4 plays, −7 yards, 0:56.
- MIN – Jhurell Pressley 28-yard pass from Brad Sorensen (Blair Walsh kick), 0:33. Vikings 13–7. Drive: 1 play, 28 yards, 0:09.

Third quarter

- LA – Greg Zuerlein 35-yard field goal, 4:47. Vikings 13–10. Drive: 13 plays, 59 yards, 7:31.
- MIN – Jhurell Pressley 106-yard kickoff return (Blair Walsh kick), 4:32. Vikings 20–10. Drive: 0 plays, 0 yards, 0:15.

Fourth quarter

- MIN – C. J. Ham 1-yard run (Blair Walsh kick), 11:37. Vikings 27–10. Drive: 3 plays, 6 yards, 1:17.
- LA – Paul McRoberts 2-yard pass from Sean Mannion (Terrence Magee run), 6:14. Vikings 27–18. Drive: 12 plays, 61 yards, 5:23.
- LA – Aaron Green 26-yard run (Greg Zuerlein kick), 1:53. Rams 27–25. Drive: 7 plays, 64 yards, 2:02.

Top passers

- LA – Sean Mannion – 15/23, 135 yards, TD
- MIN – Joel Stave – 9/18, 76 yards

Top rushers

- LA – Aaron Green – 13 rushes, 66 yards, TD
- MIN – C. J. Ham – 15 rushes, 59 yards, TD

Top receivers

- LA – Temarrick Hemingway – 3 receptions, 41 yards
- MIN – Jhurell Pressley – 4 receptions, 49 yards, TD

== Regular season ==
=== Schedule ===
Week	Date	Opponent	Result	Record	Venue	Attendance	NFL.com recap
1	September 11	at Tennessee Titans	**W** 25–16	1–0	Nissan Stadium	63,816	Recap
2	September 18	**Green Bay Packers**	**W** 17–14	2–0	U.S. Bank Stadium	66,813	Recap
3	September 25	at Carolina Panthers	**W** 22–10	3–0	Bank of America Stadium	73,813	Recap
4	October 3	New York Giants	**W** 24–10	4–0	U.S. Bank Stadium	66,690	Recap
5	October 9	Houston Texans	**W** 31–13	5–0	U.S. Bank Stadium	66,683	Recap
6	Bye						
7	October 23	at Philadelphia Eagles	**L** 10–21	5–1	Lincoln Financial Field	69,596	Recap
8	October 31	at **Chicago Bears**	**L** 10–20	5–2	Soldier Field	60,422	Recap
9	November 6	**Detroit Lions**	**L** 16–22 (OT)	5–3	U.S. Bank Stadium	66,807	Recap
10	November 13	at Washington Redskins	**L** 20–26	5–4	FedExField	78,216	Recap
11	November 20	Arizona Cardinals	**W** 30–24	6–4	U.S. Bank Stadium	66,808	Recap
12	November 24	at **Detroit Lions**	**L** 13–16	6–5	Ford Field	63,793	Recap
13	December 1	Dallas Cowboys	**L** 15–17	6–6	U.S. Bank Stadium	66,860	Recap
14	December 11	at Jacksonville Jaguars	**W** 25–16	7–6	EverBank Field	62,701	Recap
15	December 18	Indianapolis Colts	**L** 6–34	7–7	U.S. Bank Stadium	66,820	Recap
16	December 24	at **Green Bay Packers**	**L** 25–38	7–8	Lambeau Field	77,856	Recap
17	January 1	**Chicago Bears**	**W** 38–10	8–8	U.S. Bank Stadium	66,808	Recap

- Note: Intra-division opponents are in **bold** text.

=== Game summaries ===
==== Week 1: at Tennessee Titans ====
Week 1: Minnesota Vikings at Tennessee Titans – Game summary

Quarter	1	2	3	4	Total
**Vikings**	0	0	12	13	**25**
Titans	3	7	0	6	**16**

at Nissan Stadium, Nashville, Tennessee

- Date: September 11
- Game time: 12:00 p.m. CDT
- Game weather: Sunny, 76 °F (24 °C)
- Game attendance: 63,816
- Referee: Walt Coleman (65)
- TV announcers (Fox): Dick Stockton, Chris Spielman and Kristina Pink
- Recap, Game Book

Game information

**First quarter**

- TEN – Ryan Succop 28-yard field goal, 4:45. Titans 3–0. **Drive: 8 plays, 53 yards, 4:24.**

**Second quarter**

- TEN – DeMarco Murray 6-yard pass from Marcus Mariota (Ryan Succop kick), 0:41. Titans 10–0. **Drive: 13 plays, 73 yards, 4:14.**

**Third quarter**

- MIN – Blair Walsh 50-yard field goal, 13:56. Titans 10–3. **Drive: 4 plays, 2 yards, 1:04.**
- MIN – Blair Walsh 33-yard field goal, 5:59. Titans 10–6. **Drive: 11 plays, 58 yards, 5:31.**
- MIN – Eric Kendricks 77-yard interception return (kick failed, wide left), 1:24. Vikings 12–10.

**Fourth quarter**

- MIN – Blair Walsh 45-yard field goal, 11:17. Vikings 15–10. **Drive: 10 plays, 42 yards, 4:05.**
- MIN – Danielle Hunter 24-yard fumble return (Blair Walsh kick), 11:03. Vikings 22–10.
- MIN – Blair Walsh 30-yard field goal, 2:36. Vikings 25–10. **Drive: 7 plays, 45 yards, 3:33.**
- TEN – DeMarco Murray 4-yard pass from Marcus Mariota (pass failed), 0:28. Vikings 25–16. **Drive: 9 plays, 74 yards, 2:08.**

**Top passers**

- MIN – Shaun Hill – 18/33, 236 yards
- TEN – Marcus Mariota – 25/41, 271 yards, 2 TD, INT

**Top rushers**

- MIN – Adrian Peterson – 19 rushes, 31 yards
- TEN – DeMarco Murray – 13 rushes, 42 yards

**Top receivers**

- MIN – Stefon Diggs – 7 receptions, 103 yards
- TEN – Tajae Sharpe – 7 receptions, 76 yards

Shaun Hill started at quarterback in the team's first game, as Sam Bradford was rested until the second game.

==== Week 2: vs. Green Bay Packers ====
Week 2: Green Bay Packers at Minnesota Vikings – Game summary

Quarter	1	2	3	4	Total
Packers	7	0	0	7	**14**
**Vikings**	0	10	7	0	**17**

at U.S. Bank Stadium, Minneapolis, Minnesota

- Date: September 18
- Game time: 7:30 p.m. CDT
- Game weather: None (indoor stadium)
- Game attendance: 66,813
- Referee: Walt Anderson (66)
- TV announcers (NBC): Al Michaels, Cris Collinsworth and Michele Tafoya
- Recap, Game Book

Game information

**First quarter**

- GB – Jordy Nelson 1-yard pass from Aaron Rodgers (Mason Crosby kick), 5:39. Packers 7–0. **Drive: 5 plays, 52 yards, 3:08.**

**Second quarter**

- MIN – Kyle Rudolph 8-yard pass from Sam Bradford (Blair Walsh kick), 10:14. Tied 7–7. **Drive: 10 plays, 54 yards, 4:46.**
- MIN – Blair Walsh 46-yard field goal, 0:27. Vikings 10–7. **Drive: 8 plays, 59 yards, 4:14.**

**Third quarter**

- MIN – Stefon Diggs 25-yard pass from Sam Bradford (Blair Walsh kick), 2:11. Vikings 17–7. **Drive: 6 plays, 87 yards, 2:46.**

**Fourth quarter**

- GB – Aaron Rodgers 10-yard run (Mason Crosby kick), 12:41. Vikings 17–14. **Drive: 10 plays, 75 yards, 4:30.**

**Top passers**

- GB – Aaron Rodgers – 20/36, 213 yards, TD, INT
- MIN – Sam Bradford – 22/31, 286 yards, 2 TD

**Top rushers**

- GB – Eddie Lacy – 12 rushes, 50 yards
- MIN – Adrian Peterson – 12 rushes, 19 yards

**Top receivers**

- GB – Jordy Nelson – 5 receptions, 73 yards, TD
- MIN – Stefon Diggs – 9 receptions, 182 yards, TD

Sam Bradford made his first start for the Vikings in week 2 against the Packers just 15 days after being traded. Despite not having much time to learn the offense, Bradford outplayed Aaron Rodgers but ended up hurting his left hand in the first half due to a hit by Clay Matthews. Bradford finished the game completing 22-of-31 passes for 286 yards and two touchdowns, helping lead the Vikings to their first win in their new stadium.

==== Week 3: at Carolina Panthers ====
Week 3: Minnesota Vikings at Carolina Panthers – Game summary

Quarter	1	2	3	4	Total
**Vikings**	2	6	8	6	**22**
Panthers	10	0	0	0	**10**

at Bank of America Stadium, Charlotte, North Carolina

- Date: September 25
- Game time: 1:00 p.m. EDT/12:00 p.m. CDT
- Game weather: Partly cloudy, 80 °F (27 °C)
- Game attendance: 73,813
- Referee: Jerome Boger (23)
- TV announcers (Fox): Chris Myers, Ronde Barber and Jennifer Hale
- Recap, Game Book

Game information

**First quarter**

- CAR – Graham Gano 48-yard field goal, 10:52. Panthers 3–0. **Drive: 7 plays, 48 yards, 4:08.**
- CAR – Cam Newton 3-yard run (Graham Gano kick), 5:20. Panthers 10–0. **Drive: 7 plays, 57 yards, 3:51.**
- MIN – Cam Newton sacked in the end zone by Danielle Hunter for a safety, 1:44. Panthers 10–2.

**Second quarter**

- MIN – Marcus Sherels 54-yard punt return (kick failed, wide right), 3:21. Panthers 10–8.

**Third quarter**

- MIN – Kyle Rudolph 15-yard pass from Sam Bradford (Jerick McKinnon run), 9:43. Vikings 16–10. **Drive: 10 plays, 79 yards, 5:17.**

**Fourth quarter**

- MIN – Blair Walsh 28-yard field goal, 13:14. Vikings 19–10. **Drive: 7 plays, 33 yards, 2:46.**
- MIN – Blair Walsh 31-yard field goal, 5:07. Vikings 22–10. **Drive: 11 plays, 49 yards, 5:55.**

**Top passers**

- MIN – Sam Bradford – 18/28, 171 yards, TD
- CAR – Cam Newton – 21/35, 262 yards, 3 INT

**Top rushers**

- MIN – Jerick McKinnon – 16 rushes, 45 yards
- CAR – Cameron Artis-Payne – 12 rushes, 47 yards

**Top receivers**

- MIN – Kyle Rudolph – 7 receptions, 70 yards, TD
- CAR – Greg Olsen – 6 receptions, 64 yards

==== Week 4: vs. New York Giants ====
Week 4: New York Giants at Minnesota Vikings – Game summary

Quarter	1	2	3	4	Total
Giants	0	3	0	7	**10**
**Vikings**	7	7	3	7	**24**

at U.S. Bank Stadium, Minneapolis, Minnesota

- Date: October 3
- Game time: 7:30 p.m. CDT
- Game weather: None (indoor stadium)
- Game attendance: 66,690
- Referee: Brad Allen (122)
- TV announcers (ESPN): Sean McDonough, Jon Gruden and Lisa Salters
- Recap, Game Book

Game information

**First quarter**

- MIN – Matt Asiata 1-yard run (Blair Walsh kick), 6:28. Vikings 7–0. **Drive: 6 plays, 41 yards, 2:42.**

**Second quarter**

- MIN – Kyle Rudolph 7-yard pass from Sam Bradford (Blair Walsh kick), 7:59. Vikings 14–0. **Drive: 9 plays, 65 yards, 4:56.**
- NYG – Josh Brown 40-yard field goal, 0:02. Vikings 14–3. **Drive: 11 plays, 44 yards, 2:44.**

**Third quarter**

- MIN – Blair Walsh 44-yard field goal, 7:39. Vikings 17–3. **Drive: 6 plays, 17 yards, 2:16.**

**Fourth quarter**

- NYG – Orleans Darkwa 1-yard run (Josh Brown kick), 13:38. Vikings 17–10. **Drive: 5 plays, 91 yards, 1:47.**
- MIN – Jerick McKinnon 4-yard run (Blair Walsh kick), 9:20. Vikings 24–10. **Drive: 8 plays, 76 yards, 4:18.**

**Top passers**

- NYG – Eli Manning – 25/45, 261 yards, INT
- MIN – Sam Bradford – 26/36, 262 yards, TD

**Top rushers**

- NYG – Orleans Darkwa – 12 rushes, 48 yards, TD
- MIN – Jerick McKinnon – 18 rushes, 85 yards, TD

**Top receivers**

- NYG – Paul Perkins – 2 receptions, 72 yards
- MIN – Charles Johnson – 2 receptions, 70 yards

==== Week 5: vs. Houston Texans ====
Week 5: Houston Texans at Minnesota Vikings – Game summary

Quarter	1	2	3	4	Total
Texans	0	6	0	7	**13**
**Vikings**	14	10	0	7	**31**

at U.S. Bank Stadium, Minneapolis, Minnesota

- Date: October 9
- Game time: 12:00 p.m. CDT
- Game weather: None (indoor stadium)
- Game attendance: 66,683
- Referee: Jeff Triplette (42)
- TV announcers (CBS): Spero Dedes and Solomon Wilcots
- Recap, Game Book

Game information

**First quarter**

- MIN – Adam Thielen 36-yard pass from Sam Bradford (Blair Walsh kick), 11:23. Vikings 7–0. **Drive: 8 plays, 84 yards, 3:37.**
- MIN – Matt Asiata 1-yard run (Blair Walsh kick), 6:28. Vikings 14–0. **Drive: 8 plays, 55 yards, 3:52.**

**Second quarter**

- MIN – Blair Walsh 19-yard field goal, 9:58. Vikings 17–0. **Drive: 15 plays, 58 yards, 6:19.**
- MIN – Marcus Sherels 79-yard punt return (Blair Walsh kick), 8:46. Vikings 24–0.
- HOU – Nick Novak 38-yard field goal, 5:42. Vikings 24–3. **Drive: 8 plays, 55 yards, 3:04.**
- HOU – Nick Novak 30-yard field goal, 1:37. Vikings 24–6. **Drive: 10 plays, 42 yards, 2:04.**

**Third quarter**

- No scoring plays

**Fourth quarter**

- MIN – Cordarrelle Patterson 9-yard pass from Sam Bradford (Blair Walsh kick), 14:09. Vikings 31–6. **Drive: 9 plays, 65 yards, 4:42.**
- HOU – DeAndre Hopkins 1-yard pass from Brock Osweiler (Nick Novak kick), 3:46. Vikings 31–13. **Drive: 12 plays, 75 yards, 4:29.**

**Top passers**

- HOU – Brock Osweiler – 19/42, 184 yards, TD, INT
- MIN – Sam Bradford – 22/30, 271 yards, 2 TD

**Top rushers**

- HOU – Alfred Blue – 6 rushes, 39 yards
- MIN – Matt Asiata – 14 rushes, 55 yards, TD

**Top receivers**

- HOU – C. J. Fiedorowicz – 4 receptions, 61 yards
- MIN – Adam Thielen – 7 receptions, 127 yards, TD

==== Week 7: at Philadelphia Eagles ====
Week 7: Minnesota Vikings at Philadelphia Eagles – Game summary

Quarter	1	2	3	4	Total
Vikings	0	3	0	7	**10**
**Eagles**	0	11	7	3	**21**

at Lincoln Financial Field, Philadelphia, Pennsylvania

- Date: October 23
- Game time: 1:00 p.m. EDT/12:00 p.m. CDT
- Game weather: Clear, 62 °F (17 °C)
- Game attendance: 69,596
- Referee: John Hussey (35)
- TV announcers (Fox): Thom Brennaman, Troy Aikman and Erin Andrews
- Recap, Game Book

Game information

**First quarter**

- None

**Second quarter**

- MIN – Blair Walsh 48-yard field goal, 9:01. Vikings 3–0. **Drive: 12 plays, 50 yards, 4:57.**
- PHI – Josh Huff 98-yard kick return (Carson Wentz run), 8:48. Eagles 8–3. **Drive: 0 plays, 0 yards, 0:13.**
- PHI – Caleb Sturgis 35-yard field goal, 0:07. Eagles 11–3. **Drive: 10 plays, 35 yards, 2:35.**

**Third quarter**

- PHI – Dorial Green-Beckham 5-yard pass from Carson Wentz (Caleb Sturgis kick), 5:45. Eagles 18–3. **Drive: 9 plays, 77 yards, 5:51.**

**Fourth quarter**

- PHI – Caleb Sturgis 21-yard field goal, 6:09. Eagles 21–3. **Drive: 9 plays, 47 yards, 5:20.**
- MIN – Cordarrelle Patterson 14-yard pass from Sam Bradford (Blair Walsh kick), 0:34. Eagles 21–10. **Drive: 11 plays, 56 yards, 3:56.**

**Top passers**

- MIN – Sam Bradford – 24/41, 224 yards, TD, INT
- PHI – Carson Wentz – 16/28, 138 yards, TD, 2 INT

**Top rushers**

- MIN – Matt Asiata – 12 rushes, 55 yards
- PHI – Ryan Mathews – 14 rushes, 56 yards

**Top receivers**

- MIN – Cordarrelle Patterson – 7 receptions, 67 yards, TD
- PHI – Josh Huff – 4 receptions, 39 yards

Sam Bradford faces his former team for the first time after he was traded from the Eagles prior to the start of the season. The Vikings streak came to a halt as they lost the game 21–10.

==== Week 8: at Chicago Bears ====
Week 8: Minnesota Vikings at Chicago Bears – Game summary

Quarter	1	2	3	4	Total
Vikings	0	3	0	7	**10**
**Bears**	3	10	7	0	**20**

at Soldier Field, Chicago, Illinois

- Date: October 31
- Game time: 7:30 p.m. CDT
- Game weather: Cloudy, 58 °F (14 °C)
- Game attendance: 60,422
- Referee: Gene Steratore (114)
- TV announcers (ESPN): Sean McDonough, Jon Gruden and Lisa Salters
- Recap, Game Book

Game information

**First quarter**

- CHI – Connor Barth 30-yard field goal, 8:28. Bears 3–0. **Drive: 7 plays, 81 yards, 3:40.**

**Second quarter**

- CHI – Connor Barth 28-yard field goal, 12:44. Bears 6–0. **Drive: 8 plays, 64 yards, 3:33.**
- CHI – Jordan Howard 2-yard run (Connor Barth kick), 7:49. Bears 13–0. **Drive: 6 plays, 43 yards, 3:36.**
- MIN – Blair Walsh 30-yard field goal, 0:25. Bears 13–3. **Drive: 15 plays, 59 yards, 7:24.**

**Third quarter**

- CHI – Alshon Jeffery 11-yard pass from Jay Cutler (Connor Barth kick), 9:52. Bears 20–3. **Drive: 11 plays, 75 yards, 5:08.**

**Fourth quarter**

- MIN – Stefon Diggs 25-yard pass from Sam Bradford (Blair Walsh kick), 5:41. Bears 20–10. **Drive: 10 plays, 83 yards, 3:10.**

**Top passers**

- MIN – Sam Bradford – 23/37, 228 yards, TD
- CHI – Jay Cutler – 20/31, 252 yards, TD

**Top rushers**

- MIN – Matt Asiata – 14 rushes, 42 yards
- CHI – Jordan Howard – 26 rushes, 153 yards, TD

**Top receivers**

- MIN – Stefon Diggs – 8 receptions, 76 yards, TD
- CHI – Zach Miller – 7 receptions, 88 yards

==== Week 9: vs. Detroit Lions ====
Week 9: Detroit Lions at Minnesota Vikings – Game summary

Quarter	1	2	3	4	OT	Total
**Lions**	3	7	0	6	6	**22**
Vikings	0	3	6	7	0	**16**

at U.S. Bank Stadium, Minneapolis, Minnesota

- Date: November 6
- Game time: 12:00 p.m. CST
- Game weather: None (indoor stadium)
- Game attendance: 66,807
- Referee: Ed Hochuli (85)
- TV announcers (Fox): Kenny Albert, Daryl Johnston and Laura Okmin
- Recap, Game Book

Game information

**First quarter**

- DET – Matt Prater 47-yard field goal, 7:14. Lions 3–0. **Drive: 9 plays, 57 yards, 5:00.**

**Second quarter**

- MIN – Blair Walsh 33-yard field goal, 13:20. Tied 3–3. **Drive: 12 plays, 61 yards, 4:35.**
- DET – Anquan Boldin 1-yard pass from Matthew Stafford (Matt Prater kick), 0:05. Lions 10–3. **Drive: 17 plays, 84 yards, 9:45.**

**Third quarter**

- MIN – Kyle Rudolph 1-yard pass from Sam Bradford (kick hit right upright), 4:02. Lions 10–9. **Drive: 9 plays, 78 yards, 5:33.**

**Fourth quarter**

- DET – Matt Prater 53-yard field goal, 12:33. Lions 13–9. **Drive: 4 plays, 8 yards, 1:08.**
- MIN – Rhett Ellison 1-yard run (Blair Walsh kick), 0:23. Vikings 16–13. **Drive: 13 plays, 79 yards, 3:51.**
- DET – Matt Prater 58-yard field goal, 0:00. Tied 16–16. **Drive: 4 plays, 35 yards, 0:23.**

**Overtime**

- DET – Golden Tate 28-yard pass from Matthew Stafford, 8:21. Lions 22–16. **Drive: 11 plays, 87 yards, 6:39.**

**Top passers**

- DET – Matthew Stafford – 23/36, 219 yards, 2 TD, INT
- MIN – Sam Bradford – 31/40, 273 yards, TD

**Top rushers**

- DET – Theo Riddick – 14 rushes, 70 yards
- MIN – Ronnie Hillman – 7 rushes, 30 yards

**Top receivers**

- DET – Eric Ebron – 7 receptions, 92 yards
- MIN – Stefon Diggs – 13 receptions, 80 yards

Although it was Stefon Diggs' big day, having caught 13 passes for 80 yards, it wasn't enough as the Vikings dropped 5–3.

==== Week 10: at Washington Redskins ====
Week 10: Minnesota Vikings at Washington Redskins – Game summary

Quarter	1	2	3	4	Total
Vikings	0	20	0	0	**20**
**Redskins**	7	7	6	6	**26**

at FedExField, Landover, Maryland

- Date: November 13
- Game time: 1:00 p.m. EST/12:00 p.m. CST
- Game weather: Sunny, 58 °F (14 °C)
- Game attendance: 78,216
- Referee: Pete Morelli (135)
- TV announcers (Fox): Dick Stockton, Chris Spielman and Kristina Pink
- Recap, Game Book

Game information

**First quarter**

- WAS – Jamison Crowder 4-yard pass from Kirk Cousins (Dustin Hopkins kick), 9:04. Redskins 7–0. **Drive: 10 plays, 68 yards, 4:19.**

**Second quarter**

- WAS – Vernon Davis 38-yard pass from Kirk Cousins (Dustin Hopkins kick), 14:18. Redskins 14–0. **Drive: 9 plays, 91 yards, 4:58.**
- MIN – Matt Asiata 1-yard run (Blair Walsh kick), 5:39. Redskins 14–7. **Drive: 8 plays, 67 yards, 3:52.**
- MIN – Kyle Rudolph 20-yard pass from Sam Bradford (Blair Walsh kick), 0:58. Tied 14–14. **Drive: 7 plays, 75 yards, 2:40.**
- MIN – Adam Thielen 3-yard pass from Sam Bradford (kick wide right), 0:00. Vikings 20–14. **Drive: 4 plays, 33 yards, 0:50.**

**Third quarter**

- WAS – Dustin Hopkins 30-yard field goal, 8:53. Vikings 20–17. **Drive: 12 plays, 55 yards, 6:07.**
- WAS – Dustin Hopkins 37-yard field goal, 0:38. Tied 20–20. **Drive: 11 plays, 49 yards, 5:16.**

**Fourth quarter**

- WAS – Dustin Hopkins 50-yard field goal, 9:33. Redskins 23–20. **Drive: 7 plays, 60 yards, 3:21.**
- WAS – Dustin Hopkins 28-yard field goal, 2:31. Redskins 26–20. **Drive: 8 plays, 32 yards, 3:13.**

**Top passers**

- MIN – Sam Bradford – 31/40, 307 yards, 2 TD, INT
- WAS – Kirk Cousins – 22/33, 262 yards, 2 TD

**Top rushers**

- MIN – Jerick McKinnon – 6 rushes, 16 yards
- WAS – Robert Kelley – 22 rushes, 97 yards

**Top receivers**

- MIN – Stefon Diggs – 13 receptions, 164 yards
- WAS – Pierre Garçon – 6 receptions, 81 yards

This was the last game for Blair Walsh in a Vikings uniform as he was released days after this game.

==== Week 11: vs. Arizona Cardinals ====
Week 11: Arizona Cardinals at Minnesota Vikings – Game summary

Quarter	1	2	3	4	Total
Cardinals	7	10	0	7	**24**
**Vikings**	7	13	10	0	**30**

at U.S. Bank Stadium, Minneapolis, Minnesota

- Date: November 20
- Game time: 12:00 p.m. CST
- Game weather: None (indoor stadium)
- Game attendance: 66,808
- Referee: Clete Blakeman (34)
- TV announcers (Fox): Joe Buck, Troy Aikman and Erin Andrews
- Recap, Game Book

Game information

**First quarter**

- MIN – Adam Thielen 16-yard pass from Sam Bradford (Kai Forbath kick), 10:25. Vikings 7–0. **Drive: 5 plays, 44 yards, 2:54.**
- ARI – David Johnson 1-yard run (Chandler Catanzaro kick), 4:07. Tied 7–7. **Drive: 11 plays, 75 yards, 6:18.**

**Second quarter**

- ARI – Chandler Catanzaro 34-yard field goal, 10:04. Cardinals 10–7. **Drive: 12 plays, 78 yards, 6:26.**
- MIN – Matt Asiata 2-yard run (kick blocked), 7:16. Vikings 13–10. **Drive: 5 plays, 75 yards, 2:48.**
- MIN – Xavier Rhodes 100-yard interception return (Kai Forbath kick), 3:07. Vikings 20–10.
- ARI – Jermaine Gresham 29-yard pass from Carson Palmer (Chandler Catanzaro kick), 0:50. Vikings 20–17. **Drive: 7 plays, 75 yards, 2:17.**

**Third quarter**

- MIN – Cordarrelle Patterson 104-yard kickoff return (Kai Forbath kick), 14:47. Vikings 27–17.
- MIN – Kai Forbath 27-yard field goal, 0:04. Vikings 30–17. **Drive: 11 plays, 75 yards, 5:06.**

**Fourth quarter**

- ARI – David Johnson 4-yard pass (Chandler Catanzaro kick), 7:24. Vikings 30–24. **Drive: 6 plays, 27 yards, 1:46.**

**Top passers**

- ARI – Carson Palmer – 20/38, 198 yards, 2 TD, 2 INT
- MIN – Sam Bradford – 20/28, 169 yards, TD

**Top rushers**

- ARI – David Johnson – 22 rushes, 103 yards, TD
- MIN – Jerick McKinnon – 16 rushes, 44 yards

**Top receivers**

- ARI – Larry Fitzgerald – 6 receptions, 63 yards
- MIN – Adam Thielen – 5 receptions, 65 yards, TD

==== Week 12: at Detroit Lions ====
NFL on Thanksgiving Day

Week 12: Minnesota Vikings at Detroit Lions – Game summary

Quarter	1	2	3	4	Total
Vikings	7	0	3	3	**13**
**Lions**	7	3	0	6	**16**

at Ford Field, Detroit, Michigan

- Date: November 24
- Game time: 12:30 p.m. EST/11:30 a.m. CST
- Game weather: None (indoor stadium)
- Game attendance: 63,793
- Referee: Carl Cheffers (51)
- TV announcers (CBS): Jim Nantz, Phil Simms, Tracy Wolfson and Jay Feely
- Recap, Game Book

Game information

**First quarter**

- DET – Anquan Boldin 2-yard pass from Matthew Stafford (Matt Prater kick), 7:14. Lions 7–0. **Drive: 12 plays, 75 yards, 7:46.**
- MIN – Matt Asiata 5-yard run (Kai Forbath kick), 0:40. Tied 7–7. **Drive: 12 plays, 75 yards, 6:34.**

**Second quarter**

- DET – Matt Prater 29-yard field goal, 6:45. Lions 10–7. **Drive: 6 plays, 59 yards, 3:05.**

**Third quarter**

- MIN – Kai Forbath 30-yard field goal, 7:03. Tied 10–10. **Drive: 5 plays, 49 yards, 2:42.**

**Fourth quarter**

- MIN – Kai Forbath 28-yard field goal, 12:38. Vikings 13–10. **Drive: 13 plays, 76 yards, 7:36.**
- DET – Matt Prater 48-yard field goal, 1:45. Tied 13–13. **Drive: 10 plays, 68 yards, 3:17.**
- DET – Matt Prater 40-yard field goal, 0:00. Lions 16–13. **Drive: 2 plays, −2 yards, 0:30.**

**Top passers**

- MIN – Sam Bradford – 31/37, 224 yards, INT
- DET – Matthew Stafford – 23/40, 232 yards, TD

**Top rushers**

- MIN – Jerick McKinnon – 9 rushes, 31 yards
- DET – Theo Riddick – 9 rushes, 45 yards

**Top receivers**

- MIN – Kyle Rudolph – 9 receptions, 64 yards
- DET – Golden Tate – 5 receptions, 77 yards

==== Week 13: vs. Dallas Cowboys ====
Week 13: Dallas Cowboys at Minnesota Vikings – Game summary

Quarter	1	2	3	4	Total
**Cowboys**	0	7	0	10	**17**
Vikings	3	0	3	9	**15**

at U.S. Bank Stadium, Minneapolis, Minnesota

- Date: December 1
- Game time: 7:25 p.m. CST
- Game weather: None (indoor stadium)
- Game attendance: 66,860
- Referee: Tony Corrente (99)
- TV announcers (NBC/NFLN/Twitter): Al Michaels, Cris Collinsworth and Heather Cox
- Recap, Game Book

Game information

**First quarter**

- MIN – Kai Forbath 48-yard field goal, 2:28. Vikings 3–0. **Drive: 6 plays, 32 yards, 3:17.**

**Second quarter**

- DAL – Ezekiel Elliott 1-yard run (Dan Bailey kick), 5:29. Cowboys 7–3. **Drive: 8 plays, 84 yards, 5:12.**

**Third quarter**

- MIN – Kai Forbath 36-yard field goal, 2:10. Cowboys 7–6. **Drive: 10 plays, 49 yards, 4:52.**

**Fourth quarter**

- MIN – Kai Forbath 33-yard field goal, 14:11. Vikings 9–7. **Drive: 4 plays, 4 yards, 0:56.**
- DAL – Dez Bryant 8-yard pass from Dak Prescott (Dan Bailey kick), 10:22. Cowboys 14–9. **Drive: 1 play, 8 yards, 0:06.**
- DAL – Dan Bailey 39-yard field goal, 4:15. Cowboys 17–9. **Drive: 5 plays, 33 yards, 2:22.**
- MIN – Jerick McKinnon 3-yard pass from Sam Bradford (pass failed), 0:25. Cowboys 17–15. **Drive: 8 plays, 65 yards, 1:44.**

**Top passers**

- DAL – Dak Prescott – 12/18, 139 yards, TD
- MIN – Sam Bradford – 32/45, 247 yards, TD

**Top rushers**

- DAL – Ezekiel Elliott – 20 rushes, 86 yards, TD
- MIN – Jerick McKinnon – 9 rushes, 41 yards

**Top receivers**

- DAL – Dez Bryant – 4 receptions, 84 yards, TD
- MIN – Adam Thielen – 7 receptions, 86 yards

Head coach Mike Zimmer missed this game after undergoing emergency eye surgery the night before. Special teams coordinator Mike Priefer served as interim coach for the game.

==== Week 14: at Jacksonville Jaguars ====
Week 14: Minnesota Vikings at Jacksonville Jaguars – Game summary

Quarter	1	2	3	4	Total
**Vikings**	6	3	3	13	**25**
Jaguars	0	9	7	0	**16**

at EverBank Field, Jacksonville, Florida

- Date: December 11
- Game time: 1:00 p.m. EST/12:00 p.m. CST
- Game weather: 71 °F (22 °C)
- Game attendance: 62,701
- Referee: John Hussey (35)
- TV announcers (Fox): Kenny Albert, Daryl Johnston and Laura Okmin
- Recap, Game Book

Game information

**First quarter**

- MIN – Kai Forbath 43-yard field goal, 12:20. Vikings 3–0. **Drive: 5 plays, 50 yards, 2:40.**
- MIN – Kai Forbath 32-yard field goal, 7:53. Vikings 6–0. **Drive: 5 plays, 45 yards, 2:35.**

**Second quarter**

- JAX – Jason Myers 45-yard field goal, 13:07. Vikings 6–3. **Drive: 8 plays, 34 yards, 3:00.**
- MIN – Kai Forbath 40-yard field goal, 10:49. Vikings 9–3. **Drive: 6 plays, 26 yards, 2:18.**
- JAX – Jason Myers 55-yard field goal, 6:18. Vikings 9–6. **Drive: 7 plays, 31 yards, 4:31.**
- JAX – Jason Myers 24-yard field goal, 0:09. Tied 9–9. **Drive: 10 plays, 92 yards, 1:47.**

**Third quarter**

- MIN – Kai Forbath 46-yard field goal, 8:29. Vikings 12–9. **Drive: 9 plays, 41 yards, 2:53.**
- JAX – Bryan Walters 14-yard pass from Blake Bortles (Jason Myers kick), 3:50. Jaguars 16–12. **Drive: 11 plays, 90 yards, 4:39.**

**Fourth quarter**

- MIN – Matt Asiata 1-yard run (kick failed, wide left), 14:13. Vikings 18–16. **Drive: 9 plays, 62 yards, 4:37.**
- MIN – Kyle Rudolph 3-yard pass from Sam Bradford (Kai Forbath kick), 2:13. Vikings 25–16. **Drive: 9 plays, 54 yards, 2:51.**

**Top passers**

- MIN – Sam Bradford – 24/34, 292 yards, TD
- JAX – Blake Bortles – 23/37, 257 yards, TD

**Top rushers**

- MIN – Matt Asiata – 11 rushes, 37 yards, TD
- JAX – T. J. Yeldon – 17 rushes, 59 yards

**Top receivers**

- MIN – Adam Thielen – 4 receptions, 101 yards
- JAX – Marqise Lee – 5 receptions, 113 yards

==== Week 15: vs. Indianapolis Colts ====
Week 15: Indianapolis Colts at Minnesota Vikings – Game summary

Quarter	1	2	3	4	Total
**Colts**	10	17	0	7	**34**
Vikings	0	0	3	3	**6**

at U.S. Bank Stadium, Minneapolis, Minnesota

- Date: December 18
- Game time: 12:00 p.m. CST
- Game weather: None (indoor stadium)
- Game attendance: 66,820
- Referee: Jerome Boger (23)
- TV announcers (CBS): Kevin Harlan and Rich Gannon
- Recap, Game Book

Game information

**First quarter**

- IND – Adam Vinatieri 48-yard field goal, 9:01. Colts 3–0. **Drive: 11 plays, 46 yards, 5:59.**
- IND – Robert Turbin 1-yard run (Adam Vinatieri kick), 2:22. Colts 10–0. **Drive: 11 plays, 52 yards, 4:57.**

**Second quarter**

- IND – Erik Swoope 27-yard pass from Andrew Luck (Adam Vinatieri kick), 7:16. Colts 17–0. **Drive: 9 plays, 92 yards, 5:39.**
- IND – Robert Turbin 6-yard run (Adam Vinatieri kick), 0:33. Colts 24–0. **Drive: 13 plays, 91 yards, 5:35.**
- IND – Adam Vinatieri 50-yard field goal, 0:00. Colts 27–0. **Drive: 2 plays, 4 yards, 0:19.**

**Third quarter**

- MIN – Kai Forbath 32-yard field goal, 3:51. Colts 27–3. **Drive: 12 plays, 71 yards, 4:10.**

**Fourth quarter**

- IND – Phillip Dorsett 50-yard pass from Andrew Luck (Adam Vinatieri kick), 14:55. Colts 34–3. **Drive: 7 plays, 88 yards, 3:56.**
- MIN – Kai Forbath 51-yard field goal, 11:57. Colts 34–6. **Drive: 9 plays, 39 yards, 2:58.**

**Top passers**

- IND – Andrew Luck – 21/28, 250 yards, 2 TD
- MIN – Sam Bradford – 32/42, 291 yards, INT

**Top rushers**

- IND – Frank Gore – 26 rushes, 101 yards
- MIN – Adrian Peterson – 6 rushes, 22 yards

**Top receivers**

- IND – Phillip Dorsett – 1 reception, 50 yards, TD
- MIN – Kyle Rudolph – 8 receptions, 97 yards

Adrian Peterson returned to action and had six carries for 22 yards against the Colts. This was the last game he'd ever play for the Vikings.

==== Week 16: at Green Bay Packers ====
Week 16: Minnesota Vikings at Green Bay Packers – Game summary

Quarter	1	2	3	4	Total
Vikings	3	10	0	12	**25**
**Packers**	14	14	0	10	**38**

at Lambeau Field, Green Bay, Wisconsin

- Date: December 24
- Game time: 12:00 p.m. CST
- Game weather: Cloudy, 37 °F (3 °C)
- Game attendance: 77,856
- Referee: Jeff Triplette (42)
- TV announcers (Fox): Joe Buck, Troy Aikman and Erin Andrews
- Recap, Game Book

Game information

**First quarter**

- GB – Jordy Nelson 21-yard pass from Aaron Rodgers (Mason Crosby kick), 7:13. Packers 7–0. **Drive: 5 plays, 61 yards, 2:40.**
- MIN – Kai Forbath 22-yard field goal, 3:37. Packers 7–3. **Drive: 8 plays, 65 yards, 3:36.**
- GB – Davante Adams 20-yard pass from Aaron Rodgers (Mason Crosby kick), 1:49. Packers 14–3. **Drive: 4 plays, 74 yards, 1:48.**

**Second quarter**

- MIN – Kai Forbath 26-yard field goal, 12:30. Packers 14–6. **Drive: 12 plays, 67 yards, 4:19.**
- GB – Jordy Nelson 2-yard pass from Aaron Rodgers (Mason Crosby kick), 8:11. Packers 21–6. **Drive: 3 plays, 42 yards, 1:36.**
- MIN – Adam Thielen 71-yard pass from Sam Bradford (Kai Forbath kick), 7:24. Packers 21–13. **Drive: 2 plays, 75 yards, 0:47.**
- GB – Aaron Rodgers 6-yard run (Mason Crosby kick), 0:24. Packers 28–13. **Drive: 5 plays, 54 yards, 0:30.**

**Third quarter**

- No scoring plays

**Fourth quarter**

- GB – Mason Crosby 48-yard field goal, 14:55. Packers 31–13. **Drive: 10 plays, 14 yards, 4:05.**
- GB – Richard Rodgers 13-yard pass from Aaron Rodgers (Mason Crosby kick), 9:02. Packers 38–13. **Drive: 7 plays, 53 yards, 4:23.**
- MIN – Stefon Diggs 3-yard pass from Sam Bradford (kick failed, hit right upright), 4:20. Packers 38–19. **Drive: 13 plays, 75 yards, 4:42.**
- MIN – Adam Thielen 8-yard pass from Sam Bradford (run failed), 0:32. Packers 38–25. **Drive: 10 plays, 34 yards, 3:07.**

**Top passers**

- MIN – Sam Bradford – 34/50, 382 yards, 3 TD
- GB – Aaron Rodgers – 28/38, 347 yards, 4 TD

**Top rushers**

- MIN – Jerick McKinnon – 11 rushes, 50 yards
- GB – Ty Montgomery – 9 rushes, 23 yards

**Top receivers**

- MIN – Adam Thielen – 12 receptions, 202 yards, 2 TD
- GB – Jordy Nelson – 9 receptions, 154 yards, 2 TD

With the loss, the Vikings dropped to 7–8 and were officially eliminated from postseason contention. The loss also made the Vikings the first team to twice start 5–0 or better, and on both occasions miss the playoffs (they also missed the playoffs in 2003 after starting 6–0).

==== Week 17: vs. Chicago Bears ====
Week 17: Chicago Bears at Minnesota Vikings – Game summary

Quarter	1	2	3	4	Total
Bears	0	10	0	0	**10**
**Vikings**	7	17	0	14	**38**

at U.S. Bank Stadium, Minneapolis, Minnesota

- Date: January 1, 2017
- Game time: 12:00 p.m. CST
- Game weather: None (indoor stadium)
- Game attendance: 66,808
- Referee: Terry McAulay (77)
- TV announcers (Fox): Dick Stockton, David Diehl and Kristina Pink
- Recap, Game Book

Game information

**First quarter**

- MIN – Jerick McKinnon 16-yard pass from Sam Bradford (Kai Forbath kick), 11:36. Vikings 7–0. **Drive: 6 plays, 70 yards, 3:24.**

**Second quarter**

- MIN – Kai Forbath 21-yard field goal, 14:53. Vikings 10–0. **Drive: 14 plays, 93 yards, 7:33.**
- MIN – Kyle Rudolph 22-yard pass from Sam Bradford (Kai Forbath kick), 12:51. Vikings 17–0. **Drive: 3 plays, 35 yards, 1:22.**
- CHI – Matt Barkley 2-yard pass from Cameron Meredith (Connor Barth kick), 1:48. Vikings 17–7. **Drive: 17 plays, 85 yards, 7:56.**
- MIN – Jarius Wright 1-yard pass from Sam Bradford (Kai Forbath kick), 0:18. Vikings 24–7. **Drive: 5 plays, 21 yards, 0:42.**
- CHI – Connor Barth 29-yard field goal, 0:00. Vikings 24–10. **Drive: 2 plays, 31 yards, 0:18.**

**Third quarter**

- No scoring plays

**Fourth quarter**

- MIN – Jerick McKinnon 10-yard run (Kai Forbath kick), 12:11. Vikings 31–10. **Drive: 4 plays, 40 yards, 1:56.**
- MIN – Everson Griffen 20-yard fumble return (Kai Forbath kick), 9:51. Vikings 38–10.

**Top passers**

- CHI – Matt Barkley – 10/14, 125 yards, 2 INT
- MIN – Sam Bradford – 25/33, 250 yards, 3 TD, INT

**Top rushers**

- CHI – Jordan Howard – 23 rushes, 135 yards
- MIN – Jerick McKinnon – 16 rushes, 89 yards, TD

**Top receivers**

- CHI – Cameron Meredith – 4 receptions, 61 yards
- MIN – Kyle Rudolph – 11 receptions, 117 yards, TD

=== Standings ===
==== Division ====
NFC North
	W	L	T	PCT	DIV	CONF	PF	PA	STK
^{(4)} Green Bay Packers	10	6	0	.625	5–1	8–4	432	388	W6
^{(6)} Detroit Lions	9	7	0	.563	3–3	7–5	346	358	L3
Minnesota Vikings	8	8	0	.500	2–4	5–7	327	307	W1
Chicago Bears	3	13	0	.188	2–4	3–9	279	399	L4

==== Conference ====
NFC
#	Team	Division	W	L	T	PCT	DIV	CONF	SOS	SOV	STK
**Division leaders**
1	Dallas Cowboys	East	13	3	0	.813	3–3	9–3	.471	.440	L1
2	Atlanta Falcons	South	11	5	0	.688	5–1	9–3	.480	.452	W4
3	Seattle Seahawks	West	10	5	1	.656	3–2–1	6–5–1	.441	.425	W1
4	Green Bay Packers	North	10	6	0	.625	5–1	8–4	.508	.453	W6
**Wild Cards**
5	New York Giants	East	11	5	0	.688	4–2	8–4	.486	.455	W1
6 (Note: Detroit finished ahead of Tampa Bay for the No. 6 seed and qualified for the last playoff spot based on record vs. common opponents—Detroit's cumulative record against Chicago, Dallas, Los Angeles and New Orleans was 3–2, while Tampa Bay's cumulative record against the same four teams was 2–3.)	Detroit Lions	North	9	7	0	.563	3–3	7–5	.475	.392	L3
**Did not qualify for the postseason**
7	Tampa Bay Buccaneers	South	9	7	0	.563	4–2	7–5	.492	.434	W1
8	Washington Redskins	East	8	7	1	.531	3–3	6–6	.516	.430	L1
9	Minnesota Vikings	North	8	8	0	.500	2–4	5–7	.492	.457	W1
10	Arizona Cardinals	West	7	8	1	.469	4–1–1	6–5–1	.463	.366	W2
11 (Note: New Orleans finished ahead of Philadelphia based on better record vs. conference opponents.)	New Orleans Saints	South	7	9	0	.438	2–4	6–6	.523	.393	L1
12	Philadelphia Eagles	East	7	9	0	.438	2–4	5–7	.559	.518	W2
13	Carolina Panthers	South	6	10	0	.375	1–5	5–7	.518	.354	L2
14	Los Angeles Rams	West	4	12	0	.250	2–4	3–9	.504	.500	L7
15	Chicago Bears	North	3	13	0	.188	2–4	3–9	.521	.396	L4
16	San Francisco 49ers	West	2	14	0	.125	2–4	2–10	.504	.250	L1
**Tiebreakers** (Note: When breaking ties for three or more teams under the NFL's rules, they are first broken within divisions, then comparing only the highest-ranked remaining team from each division.)

== Statistics ==
=== Team leaders ===
Category	Player(s)	Total
Passing yards	Sam Bradford	3,877
Passing touchdowns	Sam Bradford	20
Rushing yards	Jerick McKinnon	539
Rushing touchdowns	Matt Asiata	6
Receptions	Stefon Diggs	84
Receiving yards	Adam Thielen	967
Receiving touchdowns	Kyle Rudolph	7
Points	Kai Forbath	56
Kickoff return yards	Cordarrelle Patterson	792
Punt return yards	Marcus Sherels	292
Tackles	Eric Kendricks	109
Sacks	Danielle Hunter	12.5
Interceptions	Xavier Rhodes	5
Forced fumbles	Linval Joseph; Brian Robison	3

Source: Minnesota Vikings' official website

=== League rankings ===
Category	Total yards	Yards per game	NFL rank (out of 32)
Passing offense	3,836	239.8	18th
Rushing offense	1,205	75.3	32nd
Total offense	5,041	315.1	28th
Passing defense	3,327	207.9	3rd
Rushing defense	1,711	106.9	20th
Total defense	5,038	314.9	3rd

Source: NFL.com.
