= Priefer =

Priefer is a surname. Notable people with the surname include:

- Chuck Priefer (born 1941), American football coach
- Mike Priefer (born 1966), American football coach

== See also ==
- Priemer
