= List of Southern Utah Thunderbirds in the NFL draft =

This is a list of Southern Utah Thunderbirds football players in the NFL draft.

== Key ==
B	Back	K	Kicker	NT	Nose tackle
C	Center	LB	Linebacker	FB	Fullback
DB	Defensive back	P	Punter	HB	Halfback
DE	Defensive end	QB	Quarterback	WR	Wide receiver
DT	Defensive tackle	RB	Running back	G	Guard
E	End	T	Offensive tackle	TE	Tight end

= Pro Bowler
= Hall of Famer

== Selections ==
Year	Round	Overall	Player	Team	Position
2013	7	221	Brad Sorensen	San Diego Chargers	QB
2016	4	111	Miles Killebrew	Detroit Lions	DB
2016	5	157	LeShaun Sims	Tennessee Titans	DB
2022	5	168	Braxton Jones	Chicago Bears	T
