= C. J. Ham =

American football player (born 1993)

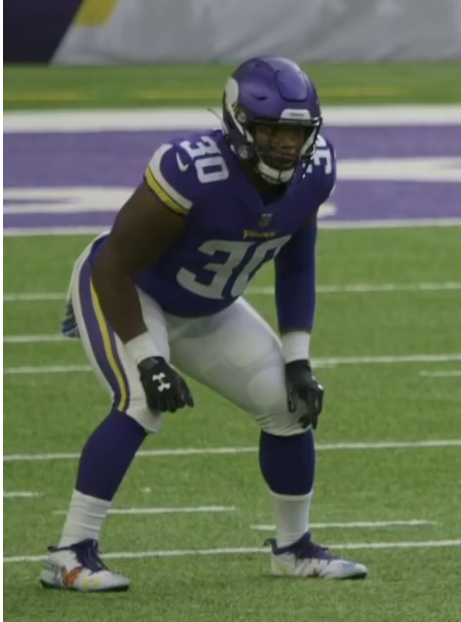
- Ham with the Minnesota Vikings in 2020

No. 30
- Position: Fullback

Personal information
- Born: July 22, 1993 (age 33); Duluth, Minnesota, U.S.
- Listed height: 5 ft 11 in (1.80 m)
- Listed weight: 250 lb (113 kg)

Career information
- High school: Denfeld (Duluth)
- College: Augustana (SD) (2012–2015)
- NFL draft: 2016: undrafted

Career history
- Minnesota Vikings (2016–2025)

Awards and highlights
- 2× Pro Bowl (2019, 2023); Second-team All-NSIC (2015)

Career NFL statistics
- Rushing yards: 119
- Rushing average: 2.8
- Rushing touchdowns: 6
- Receptions: 84
- Receiving yards: 681
- Receiving touchdowns: 2
- Total tackles: 54
- Stats at Pro Football Reference

Cortez Thaddeus Ham Jr. (born July 22, 1993) is an American former professional football player who was a fullback for 10 seasons in the National Football League (NFL). He played college football for the Augustana Vikings and was signed as an undrafted free agent by the Minnesota Vikings after the 2016 NFL draft.

Ham was a running back during his collegiate career and the rookie season of his professional career in 2016, but switched to fullback in the offseason of his second season during the 2017 offseason as a replacement for Zach Line, who had left the Vikings in free agency that offseason and has remained at the position since, although he has situationally played halfback/running back. As of the 2024 NFL season, Ham is a two-time Pro Bowl selection, being selected to the 2019 and 2023 Pro Bowls.

== Early life ==
Ham graduated from Duluth Denfeld High School in 2011, where he starred in football and track and field. In football, Ham played as a running back under head coaches Frank Huie and Chris Vold and was a three-year letterwinner and two-year starter for the Hunters, logging 1,873 total yards and 24 touchdowns between his junior and senior seasons. On defense, he recorded 109 tackles. Ham was an all-conference and all-section selection and received an all-state honorable mention in recognition of his successful season.

== College career ==
Ham attended Augustana University in Sioux Falls, South Dakota, from 2011 to 2015, where he was a four-year letterwinner in both football and track & field. In his college football career with the Augustana Vikings, Ham had 570 carries for 2,662 yards and 29 touchdowns to go along with 96 receptions for 949 yards and six touchdowns. In track and field, he was a two-time All-Northern Sun Intercollegiate Conference (NSIC) honoree in the shot put. Ham currently holds the school record in the indoor weight throw and the outdoor hammer throw.

=== Football ===
As a redshirt freshman in 2012, Ham appeared in nine games, making three starts at fullback. He finished the season with 404 rushing yards on 82 carries (4.9 yards-per-carry) with two scores and also caught seven passes for 40 yards. On October 13 against Upper Iowa, Ham rushed for a season-high 105 yards.

As a sophomore in 2013, Ham switched to running back and played in all 11 games, rushing 106 times for 422 yards (3.7 yards-per-carry and 35.2 yards-per-game) and four rushing touchdowns. He rushed for a season-high two touchdowns and picked up 43 receiving yards against SMSU on November 16. Ham's season-high in rushing yards came against MSU Moorhead on September 7 and Wayne State on October 5, games in which he rushed for 66 yards.

As a junior in 2014, Ham played for the second straight season in all 11 games, making six starts at running back. He rushed 148 times for a team-high 774 yards (5.2 yards-per-carry and 70.4 yards-per-game) and seven touchdowns, averaging 100.0 all-purpose yards per game. Ham recorded two 100-plus yard rushing games. He set a career-high in rushing yards in a game with 146 yards and two touchdowns at Minnesota Crookston on September 6. Ham rushed for 69 yards and two touchdowns against UMary on September 27.

As a senior in 2015, Ham returned as a starter at running back and played in all 12 games. He rushed for a career-high 1,097 yards and 16 touchdowns and was selected to the All-NSIC second-team. In a game at Winona State on November 7, Ham recorded a career-high 30 carries while picking up 96 yards and three touchdowns. He helped lead Augustana to its first playoff appearance since 2010, finishing the regular season with 1,043 rushing yards and 15 rushing touchdowns. Ham entered the postseason with one rushing touchdown and 71 yards shy of Augustana's single season records after he became just the fourth back in program history to rush for 1,000-plus. Ham was voted by the NSIC football coaches as the 2015 NSIC Glen Galligan Award recipient. The award is given to a student or athlete who participates at his institution for four years and is academically superior while making a positive contribution to the institution.

=== Track and field ===
During his freshman season, in 2012, Ham placed second with a season-best in the shot put (51 feet 3 inches (15.62 m)) at the Wayne State Dual on February 18. He earned fifth place at the NSIC Championships in the weight throw (50 feet 2 1/4 inches (15.297 m)) and shot put (51 feet 1 3/4 inches (15.589 m)) on February 25. He notched an eighth-place finish at the NSIC Championships on May 11 in the discus throw (145 feet 5 inches (44.32 m)).

As a sophomore, in 2013, Ham finished seventh in the weighted throw (54 feet 5 1/2 inches (16.599 m)) at the Bison Open on February 9. He placed third in the shot put (52 feet 3 3/4 inches (15.945 m)) at the NSIC Championships on February 22.

As a junior, in 2014, Ham set the school record in the weight throw (59 feet 0 1/4 inch (17.990 m)) on February 21, 2015, at the USD Twilight. At the NSIC Championships, he placed second in the shot put (55 feet 1 1/2 inches (16.802 m)). Outdoors, he notched an eighth-place finish in the hammer throw (160 feet 2 inches (48.82 m)) at the Howard Wood Dakota Relays on May 2, 2015.

As a senior, in 2015, Ham won the weight throw event at the NSIC Indoor Championships with a throw of 18.34 meters, and placed second in the shot put with a career best throw of 16.90 meters (55'4"), earning NCAA Provisional marks in both events. He also won both the shot put (16.37 meters) and weighted throw (19.02 meter) at the NWU Open.

== Professional career ==
Pre-draft measurables
Height	Weight	Arm length	Hand span	40-yard dash	10-yard split	20-yard split	20-yard shuttle	Three-cone drill	Vertical jump	Broad jump	Bench press
5 ft 11 1/4 in (1.81 m)	231 lb (105 kg)	31 1/4 in (0.79 m)	9 1/8 in (0.23 m)	4.69 s	1.62 s	2.64 s	4.35 s	7.40 s	37.0 in (0.94 m)	9 ft 10 in (3.00 m)	22 reps
All values from South Dakota State Pro Day

In 2016, Ham participated in the Minnesota Vikings rookie minicamp, competing on a trial basis. On May 10, 2016, following rookie minicamp, Ham was signed as a free agent to the 90-man roster becoming the fifth player in Augustana history to sign with an NFL team. In his first preseason game, Ham led the team in rushing with 35 yards on 12 carries, including a 10-yard touchdown, and catching one pass for nine yards, defeating the Bengals 17–16. Ham led the Vikings in rushing yards in the preseason with 140 yards on 44 carries, including two touchdowns. On September 3, he was released by the Vikings as part of final roster cuts and was signed to the practice squad the next day. He was promoted to the active roster on December 23.

During the Vikings' 2017 rookie minicamp, Ham announced that he was switching positions from running back to fullback. Ham replaced the departing Zach Line, who had signed with the New Orleans Saints as a free agent during the 2017 off-season, as the Vikings' fullback. He made the 53-man active roster and in Week 2 against the Pittsburgh Steelers, scored his first NFL touchdown on his first NFL carry with a one-yard plunge from the goal line. Overall, he finished the 2017 season with seven carries for 13 yards and a touchdown to go along with seven receptions for 68 yards.

In the 2018 season, Ham appeared in 15 games and recorded 11 receptions for 85 yards.

In the 2019 season, Ham appeared in all 16 games and recorded 17 receptions for 149 yards and a touchdown.

On March 18, 2020, Ham signed a three-year, $12.25 million contract extension with the Vikings. He was placed on the reserve/COVID-19 list by the team on November 19, and activated two days later. Ham appeared in 15 games and started 11 in the 2020 season. In addition to his role on the offense, Ham had a special teams role. He had one receiving touchdown on the season, which came in Week 13 against the Jacksonville Jaguars.

Ham appeared in all 17 games and started eight in the 2021 season. He had seven carries for 34 yards and 17 receptions for 125 yards while continuing his roles on offense and special teams.

Ham appeared in all 17 games and started four in the 2022 season. He had two rushing touchdowns on the season.

On March 24, 2023, Ham signed a two-year contract extension, keeping him under contract through the 2025 season. In the 2023 season, Ham appeared in all 17 games in an offensive and special teams role.

On December 5, 2024, Ham was named the Vikings' nominee for the 2024-2025 NFL Walter Payton Man of the Year award. He appeared in all 17 games in the 2024 season splitting time between the offense and special teams.

Ham missed the first four games of the 2025 season due to a knee injury. Ham was activated from injured reserve on October 4, 2025.

On February 5, 2026, Ham announced his retirement from the NFL following 10 years in the league.

== Career statistics ==
=== NFL ===
==== Offense ====
Year	Team	Games		Rushing					Receiving					Fumbles	
Year	Team	GP	GS	Att	Yds	Avg	Lng	TD	Rec	Yds	Avg	Lng	TD	Fum	Lost
2016	MIN	0	0	DNP											
2017	MIN	16	1	7	13	1.9	3	1	7	68	9.7	12	0	0	0
2018	MIN	15	2	6	8	1.3	5	0	11	85	7.7	17	0	0	0
2019	MIN	16	7	7	17	2.4	9	0	17	149	8.8	36	1	1	1
2020	MIN	15	11	5	18	3.6	10	0	8	97	12.1	30	1	0	0
2021	MIN	17	8	7	34	4.9	30	0	17	125	7.4	27	0	0	0
2022	MIN	17	4	4	7	1.8	3	2	10	86	8.6	17	0	0	0
2023	MIN	17	5	1	7	7.0	7	0	7	25	3.6	7	0	0	0
2024	MIN	17	3	2	10	5.0	8	1	5	35	7.0	13	0	1	1
2025	MIN	11	1	3	5	1.7	3	2	2	11	5.5	6	0	0	0
Career		141	42	42	119	2.8	30	6	84	681	8.1	36	2	2	2

==== Defense / special teams ====
Year	Team	Tackles				Returning					Fumbles			
Year	Team	Comb	Solo	Ast	Sack	Ret	Yds	Avg	Lng	TD	FF	FR	Yds	TD
2016	MIN	DNP												
2017	MIN	14	9	5	0.0	—	—	—	—	—	0	0	0	0
2018	MIN	4	0	4	0.0	—	—	—	—	—	0	0	0	0
2019	MIN	4	4	0	0.0	2	33	16.5	17	0	0	0	0	0
2020	MIN	6	5	1	0.0	2	31	15.5	20	0	0	0	0	0
2021	MIN	1	0	1	0.0	—	—	—	—	—	0	0	0	0
2022	MIN	8	8	0	0.0	—	—	—	—	—	0	0	0	0
2023	MIN	4	3	1	0.0	—	—	—	—	—	0	0	0	0
2024	MIN	4	2	2	0.0	—	—	—	—	—	0	1	0	0
2025	MIN	9	4	5	0.0	—	—	—	—	—	0	0	0	0
Career		54	35	19	0.0	4	64	16.0	20	0	0	1	0	0

=== College ===
Season	Team	Rushing					Receiving		
Season	Team	Att	Yards	Avg	Yds/G	TD	Rec	Yards	TD
2012	Augustana	82	404	4.9	44.9	2	7	40	0
2013	Augustana	106	387	3.7	35.2	4	20	152	1
2014	Augustana	148	774	5.2	70.4	7	30	326	2
2015	Augustana	234	1,097	4.7	91.4	16	39	431	3
Career		570	2,662	4.7	61.9	29	96	949	6

== Personal life ==
Ham was a physical education and health major at Augustana and plans on teaching and coaching football and track and field. Since his freshman season at Augustana, Ham volunteered as a peer educator and mentor in the Sioux Falls School District and volunteered weekly at the Boys and Girls Club.

Ham is a Christian. As a leader and member of Augustana's Fellowship of Christian Athletes, Ham spent time as a student engagement volunteer at Embrace Church. He volunteered as a speaker in advocacy groups for children with disabilities. Ham had a speech disorder that had affected him his entire life, and spoke about how kids can be successful in life if they believe in themselves. Ham has served on numerous projects with Habitat for Humanity with the Augustana football program during his career.
