= Primmer =

Primmer is a surname. Notable people with the surname include:

- Cyril Primmer (1924–2003), Australian politician
- Wayne Primmer (born 1959), Australian rules footballer

== See also ==
- Priemer
