= Priemer =

Priemer is a surname. Notable people with the surname include:

- Manuela Priemer (born 1978), German hammer thrower
- Petra Priemer (born 1961), German swimmer

== See also ==
- Priefer
- Primmer
