= Toby Johnson (American football) =

American football player (born 1991)

No. 90
- Position: Defensive tackle

Personal information
- Born: September 1, 1991 (age 35); Moorhead, Mississippi, U.S.
- Listed height: 6 ft 4 in (1.93 m)
- Listed weight: 320 lb (145 kg)

Career information
- High school: Banneker (Union City, Georgia)
- College: Georgia
- NFL draft: 2015: undrafted

Career history

Playing
- Tennessee Titans (2015)*; Jacksonville Jaguars (2015)*; Chicago Bears (2015)*; Minnesota Vikings (2015–2016); Carolina Panthers (2017)*; Detroit Lions (2017–2018)*; Massachusetts Pirates (2019); New York Guardians (2020); Massachusetts Pirates (2021); New Jersey Generals (2022–2023); Houston Roughnecks (2024)
- * Offseason or practice squad member only

Coaching
- Massachusetts Pirates (2025)

Awards and highlights
- USFL: 2× All-USFL Team (2022, 2023); IFL: United Bowl champion (2021); First-team All-IFL (2021); NCAA: Second-team NJCAA All-American (2012)

Career NFL statistics
- Total tackles: 2
- Stats at Pro Football Reference

Roderick L. "Toby" Johnson Jr. (born September 1, 1991) is an American former professional football player who was a defensive tackle in the National Football League (NFL). He played college football for the Georgia Bulldogs after two years at Hutchinson Community College and was signed by the Tennessee Titans as an undrafted free agent after the 2015 NFL draft.

== Early life ==
Johnson attended Banneker High School in suburban Atlanta, where he played football, basketball and competed in track and field. Listed at 6'3", 240 lbs, he earned All-State honors as a tight end and All-Region recognition as a defensive end as a senior in 2010.

== College career ==
=== Hutchinson Community College ===
Johnson attended Hutchinson Community College from 2011 to 2012, where he was teammates with Cordarrelle Patterson in his freshman year. Entering the 2012 season as the No. 1 overall junior college recruit in the nation, Johnson normally drew double teams and still put together a solid season despite missing the final two and a half games due to injuries. Johnson had a career-high seven total tackles against Dodge City on September 15. He had six tackles each against Air Force Prep and Independence. He recorded 37 total tackles (12 solo) with 6.5 of them for loss and three quarterback sacks. He also had four passes defensed. After the Blue Dragons won the Salt City Bowl, Johnson earned All-America honors along with three more Hutchinson teammates.

During his time at Hutchinson, Johnson posted 87 total tackles, 17 tackles for loss and five quarterback sacks. He also had nine passes broken up, a forced fumble, fumble recovery and two blocked kicks.

Regular season statistics				Tackles					Interceptions						Fumbles		
Season	Team	GP	GS	Comb	Total	Ast	Sck	Tfl	PDef	Int	Yds	Avg	Lng	TDs	FF	FR	Blk
2011	Hutchinson CC	12	12	50	29	21	2.0	10.5	5	0	0	0.0	0	0	1	1	1
2012	Hutchinson CC	9	9	37	12	25	3.0	6.5	4	0	0	0.0	0	0	0	0	1
Totals		21	21	87	49	38	5.0	17.0	9	0	0	0.0	0	0	1	1	2

=== Georgia ===
On February 19, 2013, Johnson, who was rated a four-star recruit at defensive tackle and had narrowed his choices of more than 35 schools to Georgia, Auburn, Mississippi State and Oklahoma, signed a national letter of intent to play for the Georgia Bulldogs, becoming the first Blue Dragon to sign with Georgia in 17 years and Georgia's 33rd commitment of the 2013 class. He made the announcement at a news conference in the Humiston Athletic Center at the Sports Arena in Hutchinson, Kansas.

In 2013, Johnson appeared in only 10 games in a backup role for the Bulldogs due to a knee injury he suffered during his second season at Hutchinson and that was still affecting him when he arrived in Athens. On the season, he was credited with just seven tackles. The following season, he played in 13 games making four starts and recorded 27 total tackles, with five tackles for loss. On September 13, Johnson made his first career start at No. 24 South Carolina. He had his first career sack against Troy in Week 3. Against No. 9 Auburn, he registered a career-high six tackles. Johnson was recipient of the David Jacobs Football Scholarship award for the second-straight season.

Regular season statistics				Tackles					Interceptions						Fumbles		
Season	Team	GP	GS	Comb	Total	Ast	Sck	Tfl	PDef	Int	Yds	Avg	Lng	TDs	FF	FR	FR YDS
2013	Georgia	10	5	7	2	5	0.0	1.5	0	0	0	0.0	0	0	0	0	0
2014	Georgia	13	4	27	14	13	3.0	6.0	2	0	0	0.0	0	0	0	0	0
Totals		23	9	34	16	18	3.0	7.5	2	0	0	0.0	0	0	0	0	0

== Professional career ==
Pre-draft measurables
Height	Weight	Arm length	Hand span	40-yard dash	10-yard split	20-yard split	20-yard shuttle	Three-cone drill	Vertical jump	Broad jump	Bench press
6 ft 4 in (1.93 m)	312 lb (142 kg)	32 3/8 in (0.82 m)	9 in (0.23 m)	5.28 s	1.83 s	3.06 s	4.65 s	7.87 s	26.5 in (0.67 m)	8 ft 8 in (2.64 m)	25 reps
All values from Georgia's Pro Day

At Georgia's pro day, Johnson ran the 40-yard dash in 5.23 seconds with the wind and 4.84 seconds against the wind. He had a 26 1/2-inch vertical jump and an 8-foot-8 broad jump, completed the 20-yard shuttle in 4.65 seconds and the three-cone drill in 7.87 seconds and performed 25 strength lifts.

=== Tennessee Titans ===
Johnson was signed by the Titans on May 11, 2015 to their practice squad. He was later released by Tennessee after preseason cuts.

=== Jacksonville Jaguars ===
On September 7, 2015, Johnson was signed to the Jaguars' practice squad but was released on September 15, 2015.

=== Chicago Bears ===
The Chicago Bears signed Johnson to their practice squad on December 16, 2015. He was released on December 22.

=== Minnesota Vikings ===
The Minnesota Vikings signed Johnson to their practice squad on January 6, 2016. In Minnesota’s fourth preseason game against the Los Angeles Rams, Johnson made a diving interception that helped in the Vikings win. On September 3, 2016, he was released by the Vikings as part of final roster cuts and was signed to the practice squad the next day. On December 12, the Vikings promoted Johnson to the active roster after placing defensive tackle Sharrif Floyd on injured reserve. On December 17, 2016, the Vikings waived Johnson but was re-signed on December 20.

On May 17, 2017, Johnson was released by the Vikings.

=== Carolina Panthers ===
On May 18, 2017, Johnson was claimed off waivers by the Carolina Panthers. He was waived on September 2, 2017.

=== Detroit Lions ===
On December 30, 2017, Johnson was signed to the Detroit Lions' practice squad. He signed a reserve/future contract with the Lions on January 1, 2018.

On August 29, 2018, Johnson was waived/injured by the Lions and was placed on injured reserve. He was released a few days later.

=== Massachusetts Pirates (first stint) ===
Johnson signed with the Massachusetts Pirates of the National Arena League for the 2019 season. He appeared in 9 games for the Pirates and recorded 7 sacks.

=== New York Guardians ===
In October 2019, the New York Guardians drafted Johnson in the 2020 XFL draft's open phases. He had his contract terminated when the league suspended operations on April 10, 2020.

=== Massachusetts Pirates (second stint) ===
In April 2021, the Massachusetts Pirates (now affiliated with the Indoor Football League) announced that they had re-signed Johnson for their 2021 season.

=== New Jersey Generals ===
Johnson was selected in the 2022 USFL draft by the New Jersey Generals in round 25 as the 5th pick as a defensive tackle. He re-signed with the Generals on October 13, 2023. The Generals folded when the XFL and USFL merged to create the United Football League (UFL).

=== Houston Roughnecks ===
On January 5, 2024, Johnson was selected by the Houston Roughnecks during the 2024 UFL dispersal draft. He signed with the team on March 6. He was placed on Injured reserve on May 22. He was waived on August 19, 2024.

=== Career statistics ===
Regular season statistics				Tackles					Interceptions						Fumbles		
Season	Team	GP	GS	Comb	Total	Ast	Sck	Sfty	PDef	Int	Yds	Avg	Lng	TDs	FF	FR	FR YDS
2016	Minnesota Vikings	2	0	2	2	0	0.0	--	0	0	0	0.0	0	0	0	0	0
Career stats		2	0	2	2	0	0.0	--	0	0	0	--	0	0	0	0	0
