= Marcus Sherels =

American football player (born 1987)

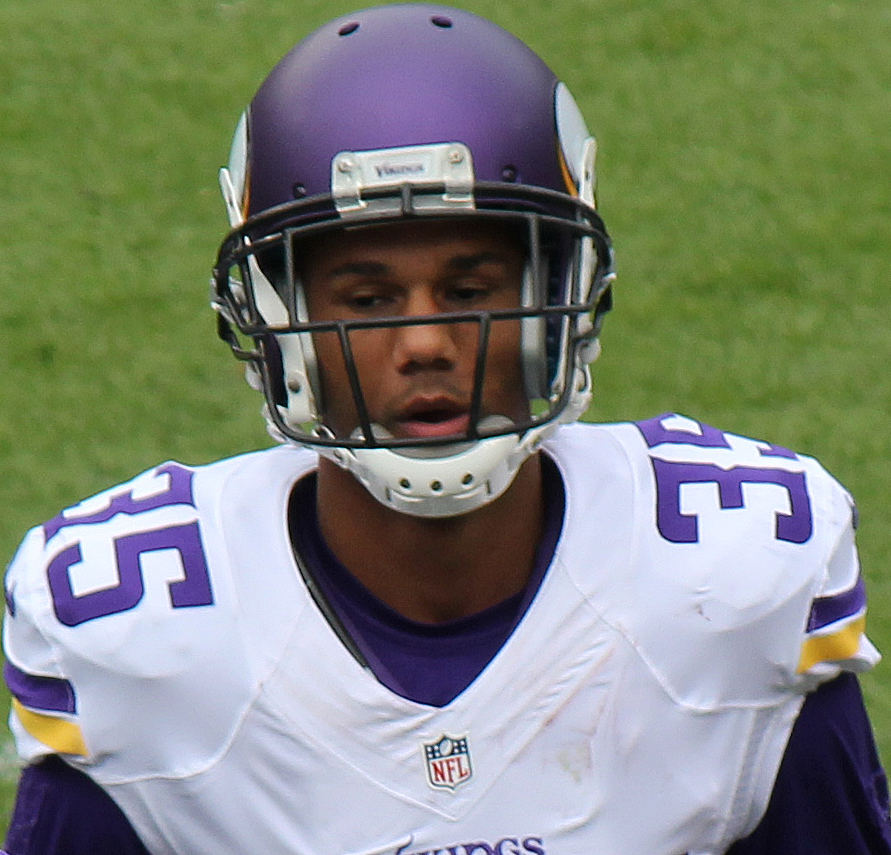
- Sherels with the Minnesota Vikings in 2015

No. 35, 48
- Positions: Cornerback, Return specialist

Personal information
- Born: September 30, 1987 (age 39); Rochester, Minnesota, U.S.
- Listed height: 5 ft 10 in (1.78 m)
- Listed weight: 175 lb (79 kg)

Career information
- High school: John Marshall (Rochester)
- College: Minnesota (2006–2009)
- NFL draft: 2010: undrafted

Career history
- Minnesota Vikings (2010–2018); New Orleans Saints (2019)*; Minnesota Vikings (2019); Miami Dolphins (2019); Minnesota Vikings (2019)
- * Offseason or practice squad member only

Career NFL statistics
- Total tackles: 108
- Forced fumbles: 1
- Interceptions: 1
- Pass deflections: 11
- Sacks: 1.0
- Total return yards: 3,912
- Total touchdowns: 5
- Stats at Pro Football Reference

Marcus John Sherels (born September 30, 1987) is an American former professional football player who was a cornerback and return specialist in the National Football League (NFL), primarily for the Minnesota Vikings. He played college football for the Minnesota Golden Gophers, and was signed by the Vikings as an undrafted free agent in 2010. Primarily known as a return specialist, Sherels is tied for first in Vikings franchise history with a 10.4 yard career punt return average (208 for 2,171 yards) and holds the franchise record with five career punt return touchdowns. He was also a member of the New Orleans Saints and Miami Dolphins.

== Early life ==
Sherels went to Franklin Elementary School, then John Marshall High School in Rochester, Minnesota. In football, he was used on both sides of the ball because of his playmaking ability, playing running back and wide receiver on offense and defensive back on defense. In 2004, he led his team to the state tournament. He was named honorable mention Associated Press (AP) All-State as a junior as he led the Rockets to a section title and 9–2 mark. As a senior, he rushed for over 1,000 yards and rushed for 100 or more yards in seven of nine games for the Rockets. They finished their 5–4 season with a 32–8 loss to Farmington in the first round of the Section 1, Class 5A playoffs, where he was held to just 36 yards on 16 carries. For his season efforts, he earned an honorable mention All-State at running back. He also excelled on the basketball team, earning all-conference honors after leading his team to the sectional semifinals, where they lost to Hastings.

== College career ==
Sherels played for the Minnesota Golden Gophers, earning a scholarship after initially joining the football program as a walk-on. He recorded four career interceptions with the Gophers and returned a fumble 88 yards for a touchdown during the 2009–2010 season.

== Professional career ==
=== Pre-draft ===
Pre-draft measurables
Height	Weight	40-yard dash	10-yard split	20-yard split	20-yard shuttle	Three-cone drill	Vertical jump	Broad jump	Bench press
5 ft 9 1/8 in (1.76 m)	175 lb (79 kg)	4.37 s	1.41 s	2.52 s	4.07 s	6.97 s	40.0 in (1.02 m)	10 ft 1 in (3.07 m)	12 reps
All values from Minnesota's Pro Day.

Sherels ran a 4.37 and 4.39-second in the 40-yard dash and recorded a 40-inch vertical jump at his Pro Day.

=== Minnesota Vikings (first stint) ===
Sherels was signed as an undrafted free agent by the Minnesota Vikings in the 2010 preseason after a strong performance in the Vikings rookie camp, where he participated on a tryout basis. Sherels holds the Vikings record with 5 career punt return touchdowns after he passed career marks of 2 previously held by Mewelde Moore and David Palmer. He also ranks second in the league from 2012 to 2015 with 1,230 punt return yards and is tied for second in that same 4-year span with 3 punt return scores. In 2013, he started a career-high 4 games at cornerback and set the Vikings' single-season record with a 15.2 punt return average, breaking the previous mark of 13.2 set by running back David Palmer during the 1995 season. He also holds the team record with 5 career punt returns of more than 50 yards. On October 21, 2013, he notched the third-longest punt return touchdown in club history with an 86-yarder against the New York Giants on Monday Night Football that helped him set the Vikings single game record with 119 punt return yards. In 2012, he became the 10th player in Vikings history to return a punt for a touchdown with a 77-yard return for a score against the Detroit Lions, the 7th-longest punt return in team history. In the 2013 preseason game against the Tennessee Titans, he set a Vikings preseason record with a 109-yard kickoff return touchdown.

==== 2010 season ====
Sherels was waived by the Vikings on September 4, 2010, and then signed to the practice squad on September 6. On September 28, Sherels was released in order to make room on the practice squad for tight end John Nalbone. On October 13, Sherels was re-signed to the Vikings practice squad and Nalbone released. This move, along with the signing of Frank Walker to the active squad, was made due to the season-ending injury sustained by starting cornerback Cedric Griffin, who was placed on injured reserve the same day. Sherels spent 15 weeks on the Vikings’ practice squad and was activated for the final game of the season against the Detroit Lions.

==== 2011 season ====
On January 1, 2011, Sherels was elevated to the active 53-man squad after safety Madieu Williams was placed on injured reserve. Sherels was moved from his habitual special teams role to start 3 games as a nickel cornerback as injuries took their toll on the Vikings secondary, but he still handled all punt return duties and was tied for second on the team with 16 kickoff returns, only behind Percy Harvin. He started the first game of his career against Arizona on October 9, a game which the Vikings won for the first win of the season. He recorded the Vikings' longest punt return of season with a 53-yarder in Week 3 against the Lions and the third-longest kickoff return with a 78-yarder against the Panthers in Week 8. In the Vikings' Week 10 loss against the Green Bay Packers he posted his first career sack against Aaron Rodgers. Sherels finished the season with 27 combined tackles, a sack and three passes defended on defense, while also returning 16 kicks for 445 yards (27.8 avg.) and 33 punts for 277 yards (8.4 avg.).

==== 2012 season ====
In 2012, Sherels handled all punt return duties and tied for the team-lead again with Percy Harvin in kickoff returns with 16. He ranked seventh in the NFC in punt return average at 9.0 yards per return. On September 30, 2012 (Sherels' 25th birthday) in an away game at the Detroit Lions, Sherels recorded his first career touchdown on a 77-yard punt return that gave the Vikings a 14-point lead in their 20–13 win. The touchdown helped match a Vikings record with a punt return touchdown and kickoff return touchdown in the same game as Percy Harvin also scored on a 105-yarder. Sherels finished the season with 9 total tackles and one pass defended as a cornerback, and 16 kick returns for 422 yards (26.4 avg.) and 32 punt returns for 287 yards (9.0 avg.).

==== 2013 season ====
In a preseason game against the Tennessee Titans, Sherels recorded a 109-yard kickoff return score and an interception of Titans' quarterback Rusty Smith. For the 2013 season Sherels led the NFC with a 15.2 yard average on punt returns, breaking the previous mark by 2 yards (David Palmer, who averaged 13.2 in 1995), and led the league in fair catches with 26. In Week 7, he set a team record for single-game punt return yards with 119 at the New York Giants, with a long of 89 yards that resulted in a touchdown. On December 8, he picked off his first career interception off Baltimore Ravens' quarterback Joe Flacco in Week 14. He had a pair of 8-tackle games during the season, at Dallas in Week 9 and at Cincinnati in Week 16. He started at cornerback for the NFL International Series game celebrated in London, England, against the Pittsburgh Steelers that resulted in the Vikings first win of the season. In Week 3, he stepped in for injured starter Chris Cook and tied for the team-high with a career-best 10 tackles, including 9 solos and led the team with 4 passes defensed against the Cleveland Browns. Sherels started three games during the season and posted a career-high 46 tackles (40 of them solo), 6 passes defended and a pick, while also returning 22 punts for 335 yards (15.2 avg.).

==== 2014 season ====
On March 7, 2014, the Vikings re-signed Sherels to a two-year contract. He tied for sixth in the NFL and third in the NFC in punt return average with 11.0 per attempt. His longest punt return of the season came at the Detroit Lions in Week 6 with a 35-yarder. In Week 5, he returned 4 kickoffs for 110 yards (27.5 avg.) with a long of 46 yards at the Green Bay Packers. On special teams, he ranked4 fourth on the team with a career-high 11 special teams tackles while adding a forced fumble. While appearing in all 16 games, Sherels posted 8 tackles on defense, returned 4 kicks for 110 yards and 27 punts for 297 yards (11.0 avg.). For his season efforts, Sherels was named the 2014 PFF All-NFC North Returner of the Year.

==== 2015 season ====
On November 4, 2015, Sherels was named the NFC Special-Teams Player of the week for the first time in regards to his Week 9 65-yard punt-return for a touchdown against the Chicago Bears that helped break an 8-game losing streak at Soldier Field. In the season opener game against the San Francisco 49ers, he jumped on a field goal blocked by teammate Andrew Sendejo and returned it 44 yards. For the season, he collected 8 tackles, all of them solo, returned 2 kicks for 33 yards (16.5 avg.) and 34 punts for 311 yards (9.1 avg.). He also ranked fifth on the team with 8 special teams tackles.

==== 2016 season ====
On March 11, the Vikings re-signed Sherels to a two-year $4 million contract with a $1.5 million guaranteed. On August 18 during a preseason game against the Seattle Seahawks, Sherels caused a pass interference late in the fourth quarter, but on the very next play, he picked off a pass from rookie quarterback Trevone Boykin and returned it 53 yards for a touchdown to help the Vikings win. In Week 3 of the regular season with the Vikings trailing 10–2 to the Carolina Panthers, Sherels changed the course of the game with a 54-yard punt return for a touchdown late in the first quarter. He also deflected a pass intended to Kelvin Benjamin late in the game. In Week 5 against the Houston Texans, Sherels returned a punt for a 79-yard touchdown that gave the Vikings a 24–0 lead. His return was seventh longest in team history, and he moved into second place among Vikings in punt return yards with 1,688, trailing only Leo Lewis, who had 1,812 in 11 seasons. Sherels, in his sixth season, also became the first Vikings player to have two games with more than 100 yards in punt returns.

==== 2017 season ====
In 2017, Sherels played in all 16 games primarily on special teams and as the Vikings primary punt returner.

==== 2018 season ====
On March 28, 2018, Sherels re-signed with the Vikings.

=== New Orleans Saints ===
On March 21, 2019, Sherels signed a one-year contract with the New Orleans Saints. He was placed on injured reserve on August 31, but was released by New Orleans the next day.

=== Minnesota Vikings (second stint) ===
On September 24, 2019, Sherels re-signed with the Minnesota Vikings. He was released by Minnesota on October 22.

=== Miami Dolphins ===
On November 5, 2019, Sherels was signed by the Miami Dolphins. He was released by the Dolphins on December 14.

=== Minnesota Vikings (third stint) ===
On January 3, 2020, Sherels re-signed with the Minnesota Vikings for the second time that season. He was not re-signed after the playoffs.

=== Minnesota Vikings franchise records ===
- Vikings' single-season punt return average: 15.2 (2013)
- Most punt return yards in a game: 119 (October 21, 2013)
- Most punt return touchdowns in a season: 2 (2016)
- Most punt return touchdowns in a career: 5
- First Vikings player to have two games with more than 100 yards in punt returns: (2016)
- Most Special Team touchdowns by any Viking in franchise history: 5 (tied with Percy Harvin and Cordarrelle Patterson)

== NFL career statistics ==
=== Defense ===
Year	Team	Games		Tackles					Interceptions						Fumbles		
Year	Team	GP	GS	Comb	Solo	Ast	Sck	Sfty	PD	Int	Yds	Avg	Lng	TD	FF	FR	Yds
2010	MIN	1	0	0	0	0	0.0	—	0	0	0	0.0	0	0	0	0	0
2011	MIN	16	3	27	21	6	1.0	—	3	0	0	0.0	0	0	0	0	0
2012	MIN	16	0	9	7	2	0.0	—	1	0	0	0.0	0	0	0	0	0
2013	MIN	16	3	46	40	6	0.0	—	6	1	0	0.0	0	0	0	0	0
2014	MIN	16	0	8	7	1	0.0	—	0	0	0	0.0	0	0	1	0	0
2015	MIN	16	0	8	8	0	0.0	—	0	0	0	0.0	0	0	0	0	0
2016	MIN	11	0	4	4	0	0.0	—	1	0	0	0.0	0	0	0	0	0
2017	MIN	16	0	6	6	0	0.0	—	0	0	0	0.0	0	0	0	0	0
Career		108	6	108	93	15	1.0	—	11	1	0	0.0	0	0	1	0	0

=== Return ===
Year	Team	Games		Kick return							Punt return								Fum
Year	Team	GP	GS	KR	Yds	Avg	Lng	TD	+20	+40	PR	Yds	Avg	Lng	TD	+20	+40	FC	Fum
2010	MIN	1	0	—	—	—	—	—	—	—	—	—	—	—	—	—	—	—	—
2011	MIN	16	3	16	445	27.8	78	0	12	1	33	277	8.4	53	0	3	1	20	0
2012	MIN	16	0	16	422	26.4	41	0	13	2	32	287	9.0	77T	1	2	1	27	1
2013	MIN	16	3	—	—	—	—	—	—	—	22	335	15.2	86T	1	5	2	27	3
2014	MIN	16	0	4	110	27.5	46	0	2	1	27	297	11.0	35	0	4	0	26	0
2015	MIN	16	0	2	33	16.5	21	0	1	0	34	311	9.1	65T	1	4	1	15	2
2016	MIN	11	0	2	35	17.5	18	0	0	0	21	292	13.9	79T	2	5	2	17	1
2017	MIN	16	0	11	271	24.6	32	0	10	0	39	372	9.5	46	0	3	1	24	1
Career		108	6	51	1,316	25.8	78	0	38	4	208	2,171	10.4	86	5	26	8	156	8

== Personal life ==
Since 2020, Sherels is a co-owner of The Bin Cleaners, a contract sanitation service in Rochester, Minnesota. He also co-owns ETS Performance, a sports performance facility in Rochester, with former Vikings teammate Adam Thielen.

Sherels is the younger brother of former University of Minnesota linebacker (and later linebackers coach) Mike Sherels.
