= Stephen Weatherly =

American football player (born 1994)

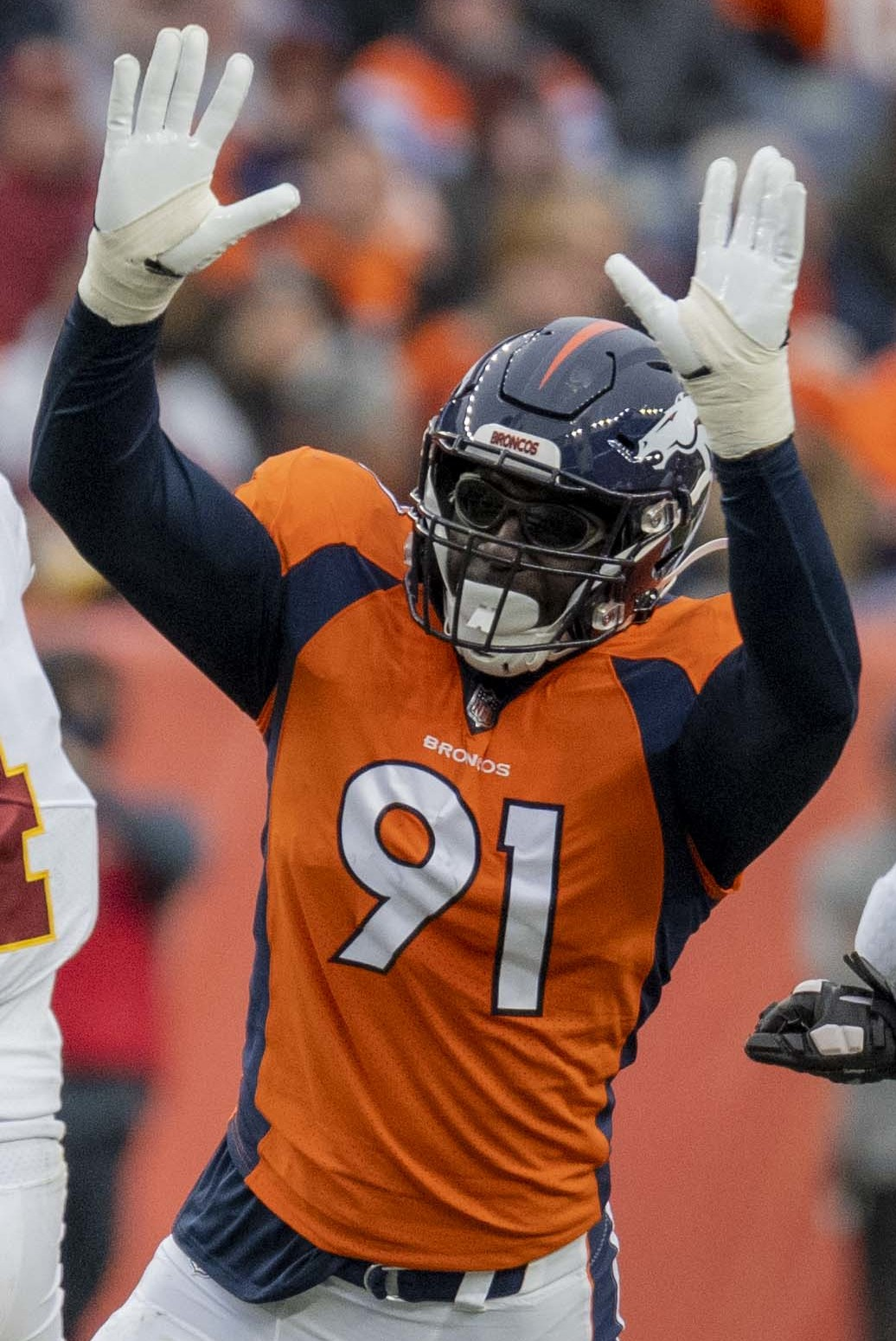
- Weatherly with the Denver Broncos in 2021

No. 91
- Positions: Defensive end, linebacker

Personal information
- Born: March 19, 1994 (age 32); Atlanta, Georgia, U.S.
- Listed height: 6 ft 5 in (1.96 m)
- Listed weight: 262 lb (119 kg)

Career information
- High school: Shiloh (Snellville, GA); North Atlanta (Atlanta, GA)
- College: Vanderbilt
- NFL draft: 2016: 7th round, 227th overall pick

Career history
- Minnesota Vikings (2016–2019); Carolina Panthers (2020); Minnesota Vikings (2021); Denver Broncos (2021); Cleveland Browns (2022)

Career NFL statistics
- Total tackles: 106
- Sacks: 8.5
- Forced fumbles: 2
- Pass deflections: 1
- Stats at Pro Football Reference

Stephen Dian Weatherly (born March 19, 1994) is an American former professional football player who was a defensive end and linebacker in the National Football League (NFL). He played college football for the Vanderbilt Commodores. Having nearly completed his degree, Weatherly declared as an early draft entrant following his junior season. He was selected by the Vikings in the seventh round of the 2016 NFL draft, and was also a member of the Carolina Panthers, Denver Broncos, and Cleveland Browns.

== Early life ==
Weatherly attended North Atlanta High School, where he was a three-year starter at outside linebacker, defensive end and wide receiver. As a junior, he posted 66 tackles and 14 sacks. He also starred in basketball at North Atlanta, helping lead the Warriors to two sub-region titles. He then transferred to Shiloh High School in Snellville, Georgia for his senior year. He was named team captain and contributed with 79 tackles, 8.5 sacks, 15 tackles for loss and a pair of forced fumbles on defense, while also hauling in eight catches and two receiving touchdowns on offense, helping lead his team to the postseason in the Gwinnett County All-Star Game. For his season efforts, he earned All-Gwinnett County honors. He was the first and only Gwinnett County player to be invited to and play in the inaugural Georgia High School Senior Allstar Bowl as an outside linebacker at the Georgia Dome.

During his time at North Atlanta, Weatherly was also a stand out as the leader of the school's robotics team that won the Georgia regional championship and went to the world championships in St. Louis, where they competed against other teams around the world. In addition, Weatherly also excelled in track and field; he competed as a sprinter and long jumper for the Warriors, recording personal-bests of 11.13 seconds in the 100-meter dash, 22.98 seconds in the 200-meter dash and 5.87 meters (19'3") in the long jump as a junior.

== College career ==
Weatherly was an ESPN 4-star recruit, ranked as the 24th best defensive end in the country. He played defensive end in his first two seasons at Vanderbilt under head coach James Franklin. Weatherly recorded his 1st college career sack against Bo Wallace in his 1st game as a red-shirt freshman in the 2013 season opener vs Ole Miss. His last 2 years at Vanderbilt were played as an outside linebacker for new head coach Derek Mason.

Regular season statistics				Tackles					Interceptions						Fumbles		
Season	Team	GP	GS	Comb	Total	Ast	Sck	Tfl	PDef	Int	Yds	Avg	Lng	TDs	FF	FR	FR YDS
2013	Vanderbilt	12	0	18	12	6	3.5	5.0	0	0	0	0.0	0	0	0	1	0
2014	Vanderbilt	12	9	59	30	29	4.5	12.5	1	0	0	0.0	0	0	1	0	0
2015	Vanderbilt	12	12	39	24	15	3.5	8.5	3	0	0	0.0	0	0	2	2	0
Totals		36	21	116	66	50	11.5	26.0	4	0	0	0.0	0	0	3	3	0

== Professional career ==
External videos
- Weatherly's NFL Combine workout
- Weatherly gets drafted by Minnesota

Pre-draft measurables
Height	Weight	Arm length	Hand span	40-yard dash	10-yard split	20-yard split	20-yard shuttle	Three-cone drill	Vertical jump	Broad jump	Bench press
6 ft 4 3/8 in (1.94 m)	267 lb (121 kg)	34 1/2 in (0.88 m)	10 1/4 in (0.26 m)	4.61 s	1.59 s	2.67 s	4.42 s	7.07 s	31 in (0.79 m)	9 ft 9 in (2.97 m)	23 reps
All values from NFL Combine, except 20-yard shuttle and 3-cone drill from Vanderbilt's Pro Day

=== Minnesota Vikings (first stint) ===
Weatherly was selected by the Minnesota Vikings in the seventh round, 227th overall of the 2016 NFL draft. He became the first Vanderbilt defensive lineman or linebacker drafted since the Indianapolis Colts selected Tim Fugger in the seventh round of the 2012 NFL draft and also the second Vanderbilt alum ever drafted by the Vikings. On September 3, 2016, he was released by the Vikings as part of final roster cuts. The next day, he was signed to the Vikings' practice squad. After spending the first 11 weeks of his rookie season on the practice squad, Weatherly was signed to the active roster on November 21, 2016. When teammate Stefon Diggs was asked which guy he would least like to date his sister in an interview, he cited Weatherly because he was "ugly." Weatherly states this incident as the sole reason why his time in Minnesota was cut short.

After not starting any games or recording any sacks during his first two seasons, Weatherly saw an increased role during the absence of Everson Griffen in 2018, starting six games and recording three sacks.

In 2019, Weatherly started only one game, but again recorded three sacks during the regular season, and had one sack in the postseason, coming in the divisional round in a loss to the San Francisco 49ers.

=== Carolina Panthers ===
Weatherly signed a two-year contract with the Carolina Panthers on March 23, 2020. He was named one of the Panthers starting defensive ends to start 2020. He started the first nine games before being placed on injured reserve on November 13, 2020, after undergoing finger surgery. He was released on February 19, 2021.

=== Minnesota Vikings (second stint) ===
Weatherly re-signed with the Vikings on March 8, 2021.

=== Denver Broncos ===
On October 23, 2021, Weatherly and a 2023 seventh-round pick was traded to the Denver Broncos for a 2022 seventh-round pick.

=== Cleveland Browns ===
On April 18, 2022, Weatherly signed with the Cleveland Browns.

On August 6, 2022, Weatherly was placed on injured reserve with a knee injury.

== Personal life ==
Weatherly majored in sociology at Vanderbilt University. His first and middle names are a tribute to his grandmother, who received degrees from both MIT and Harvard. Weatherly was part of the Fulton County Youth Commission, which was designed to address youth issues in the community by using the leaders of the youth to work in policy making and community service. He traveled throughout Germany with the program while in high school. Weatherly has an affinity for chess and math, can solve a Rubik's Cube, and enjoys puzzles and skateboarding. He is also able to play six musical instruments.

Weatherly is a hobbyist glass-blower and appeared as a guest judge on season two, episode seven, of the Netflix show Blown Away, which premiered in 2021. In the episode, Weatherly references his experience in the football community to relate with the competing artists regarding the stigma around speaking about mental health and accepting physical damage to pursue something one loves.

Weatherly is known for wearing sunglasses under his helmet during play.

He had a relationship with Olympic volleyball player Jordan Thompson.
