= Chuck Priefer =

American football coach (born 1941)

Personal information
- Born: July 26, 1941 (age 85); Parma, Ohio, U.S.

Career information
- College: John Carroll

Career history
- Padua Franciscan High School (1963–1971) Assistant Football Coach; Padua Franciscan High School (1972–1976) Head Football Coach; Miami (OH) (1977) Assistant; North Carolina (1978–1983) Defensive backs coach & defensive line coach; Green Bay Packers (1984–1985) Special teams coach; Kent State (1986) Defensive coordinator; Georgia Tech (1987–1991) Defensive backs coach; San Diego Chargers (1992–1996) Special teams coach; Detroit Lions (1997–2006) Special teams coach

Charles John Priefer (born July 26, 1941) is an American former football coach who held a variety of defensive and special teams coaching positions at the college and professional levels of the sport, including 17 seasons in the National Football League (NFL).

He attended Boromeo High School in Wickliffe, Ohio before matriculating to John Carroll University. He graduated from John Carroll in 1963 with a degree in history and Latin and earned a master's degree in American history (emphasis in American-Russian relations) from John Carroll in 1967. Priefer is the father of NFL special teams coordinator Mike Priefer.

== Coaching career 1963–1997 ==
Priefer began his coaching career at Padua Franciscan High School in Parma, Ohio as an assistant football, baseball and basketball coach in 1963. He was named head baseball coach in 1965 and assistant athletic director in 1966. From 1972 to 1976 he was the head football coach, posting a 34–15 record. In 1977, he jumped from the prep ranks to Miami University (Ohio) where he coached one season before moving on to North Carolina. He spent six seasons (1978–83) with the Tar Heels—one season as defensive backfield coach and five years as defensive line coach. North Carolina went to five straight bowl games during that time, posting a 50–20–1 record. Preceding his tenure at Georgia Tech, Priefer spent two seasons (1984–85) as the special teams coach for the Green Bay Packers. He also assisted with the Packers' linebackers. In 1984, Priefer's kickoff coverage team led the NFL by allowing only 16.0 yards per return and the special teams finished with the top average ranking in the NFC Central division. At Georgia Tech, Priefer cultivated a pass defense that ranked No. 1 in the country for several weeks in both the 1988 and 1990 seasons. Tech's pass defense ranked eighth in the country in 1991 and ranked in the top 15 three times.

Priefer possesses 29 years of college and pro coaching experience on his resume. Priefer coached the defensive backfield at Georgia Tech from 1987 to 1991 and went on to San Diego in 1992. Prior to his tenure at Georgia Tech, Priefer spent the 1986 season as the defensive coordinator at Kent State.

While at San Diego, the Chargers' special teams under Priefer also consistently ranked among the best in the NFL. KR Darrien Gordon led the AFC and was second in the NFL with a 14.9-yard punt return average. In 1994, return specialist Andre Coleman became the first player in Chargers' history to return two kickoffs for touchdowns in a single season, and he also returned a kickoff for a score in Super Bowl XXIX. He repeated that feat and also returned a punt for a score in 1995. He also averaged an AFC-high 11.6 yards per punt return in 1995. In 1994, the Chargers' punt return and kickoff return teams ranked second and third, respectively, in the league. During the 1994 regular season, San Diego was the only team to return two punts and two kickoffs for touchdowns. Punt returner Darrien Gordon led the AFC and ranked second in the NFL with a 13.2-yard average. In 1996, punter Darren Bennett, followed his standout campaign of 1995 with a record-setting season as he averaged a team-record 45.6 yards per punt. In 1995, Bennett, a former Australian Rules Football player, ranked second in the NFL with a 44.7-yard average and earned a Pro Bowl spot in his first season of organized football. Bennett's Pro Bowl appearance was the second consecutive by a Priefer student. In 1994, kicker John Carney led the NFL in scoring with 135 points en route to a Pro Bowl appearance.

== Tenure with the Lions 1997–2006 ==
Since the arrival of Priefer in 1997, the Lions have seen a noticeable upturn in production from K Jason Hanson, who scored his 1,400th career point in 2005, as well as with its "Hard Core" coverage units. Hanson has enjoyed nine outstanding seasons under Priefer's direction, being named to the Pro Bowl following both the '97 and '99 campaigns. He has been over the 100-point barrier in six of the past nine seasons and became the franchise's all-time leading scorer in 2002.

Punter Nick Harris enjoyed his finest NFL season in his second full year under Priefer. Harris' career-high 34 punts downed inside-the-20 in 2005 led the NFL and was the best single-season mark in franchise history. He also tied for the second-fewest touchbacks in the NFL with two, which gave him the best net differential between punts downed inside the 20-yard line and touchbacks in the league (32).

Over the past four years, the Lions special teams return units have been the best in the NFL when it comes to scoring touchdowns. From 2002 to 2005, the Lions recorded more special teams return touchdowns (kickoff return, punt return, blocked punt return and blocked field goal return) than any other team in the NFL. Over that four-year span, the Lions scored 11 touchdowns via special teams returns.

During Priefer's nine-year tenure in Detroit, he has had five different players return kicks for touchdowns (Terry Fair, Desmond Howard, Az-Zahir Hakim, Eddie Drummond and Reggie Swinton). Howard and Drummond both earned trips to the 2001 and 2005 Pro Bowls respectively.

At the end of The Detroit Lions' 2006 NFL Season, Head Coach Rod Marinelli announced that Special Teams Coach Chuck Priefer would be retiring, at the age of 65. Priefer spoke shortly after Marinelli, and confirmed his retirement, telling the media that he is ready to spend time with his wife, and after 44 years of coaching, the time to retire has come.

Priefer originally joined the Lions in 1997, moving along with head coach Bobby Ross from the San Diego Chargers. He was then retained as special teams coordinator by Gary Moeller, Marty Mornhinweg, Steve Mariucci, Dick Jauron, and Rod Marinelli. He ultimately served under six Lions head coaches.

== Statistics and rankings ==
Chuck Priefer has solidified the Lions' cover teams among the best in the NFL over the past few seasons. In 2004, the Lions finished third in the NFL in Average Drive Start following kickoff (kickoff team) with 24.3, four yards below the league average, including 14 touchbacks and 18 stops inside-the-20. The Lions tied for third in the NFL with 32 kickoffs that resulted either in touchbacks or stops inside the 20-yard line. In combined kicks (punts and kickoffs), Detroit tied for first in the NFL with 50 stops inside the 20-yard line (32 punts downed, 18 drives started inside-the-20 following kickoffs). The Lions tied for third in the NFL with 32 punts downed inside-the-20 and tied for second in the NFL with 18 opponent kickoff returns stopped inside-the-20. In 2003, the Lions ranked fifth in the league in covering punts by allowing just a 6.6 yards per return average. In 2002, the team's punt coverage unit ranked first in the NFL after holding opponents to a mere 4.5 average return per punt. For two-straight seasons, the Lions were the NFL's best team at pinning opponents deep in their own territory following kickoffs. The Lions kickoff coverage team led the league in average starting field position in 2000 (25.1) and 2001 (25.3). In 2002, the Lions' kickoff return unit ranked third in the NFL in average yards per kickoff return after averaging 24.6 yards per kickoff return, and the unit ranked second in the NFC after accumulating a 31.0 average starting point.

Priefer has formulated a superb combination of talent and scheme in developing the Lions' return game into a force. Five players have scored touchdowns on returns during Priefer's tenure in Detroit. In 1998, he guided Terry Fair to a league best 28.0 yards per kickoff average. In 2000, Desmond Howard's prolific punt and kickoff return game earned him a spot in the Pro Bowl. In 2002, the returner role was handed off to Eddie Drummond as he finished with the NFL's fourth-best kickoff return average (28.0 yards per return) and highest of rookies, and he returned one punt for a touchdown (73 yards) during the season. Indicative of Drummond's threat as a punt returner occurred at Arizona (12/8/02) when he returned a punt 73 yards for a touchdown. In 2003, both Drummond (1 PR) and Reggie Swinton (1 PR; 1 KR) scored touchdowns on returns. In 2004, Drummond was the NFL's leader in punt returns with a 13.2 avg (24 PR for 316 yds) and combined kick returns for touchdowns with four (2 PR, 2 KR), and ranked second in kickoff returns with a 26.6 avg (41 KR for 1,092 yds). Drummond also tied for a league-high in punt returns for touchdowns with two and tied for second in the NFL in kickoff returns for touchdowns with two. Drummond is only the second player in NFL history to return two punts and two kickoffs for touchdowns in a single season.

In 2004, the Lions posted a single-season franchise record with five special teams return touchdowns. The previous record of four special teams return touchdowns was accomplished five times, with two of them coming under Priefer's guidance (1951, 1992, 1994, 2002, and 2003).

Priefer has helped mold Pro Bowl defensive tackle Shaun Rogers into an impressive kick-blocking force. Since Rogers arrived as a rookie in 2001, Detroit has blocked a total of 13 kicks, eight by Rogers. In 2005, Rogers notched his seventh career blocked field goal when he re-directed a John Kasay 52-yard attempt vs. Carolina (10/16).
