= Willie Beavers =

American football player (born 1993)

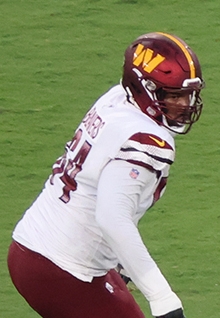
- Beavers with the Washington Commanders in 2022

No. 64
- Position: Offensive guard

Personal information
- Born: October 2, 1993 (age 33); Southfield, Michigan, U.S.
- Listed height: 6 ft 5 in (1.96 m)
- Listed weight: 324 lb (147 kg)

Career information
- High school: Southfield-Lathrup (Lathrup Village, Michigan)
- College: Western Michigan (2011–2015)
- NFL draft: 2016: 4th round, 121st overall pick

Career history
- Minnesota Vikings (2016); New England Patriots (2017)*; Minnesota Vikings (2017)*; Seattle Seahawks (2017–2018)*; Chicago Bears (2018–2019)*; San Francisco 49ers (2019)*; Dallas Renegades (2020); Atlanta Falcons (2020–2022)*; Washington Commanders (2022); Arlington Renegades (2023)
- * Offseason or practice squad member only

Awards and highlights
- XFL champion (2023); First-team All-MAC (2015); Second-team All-MAC (2014)

Career NFL statistics
- Games played: 2
- Stats at Pro Football Reference

Willie Beavers (born October 2, 1993) is an American former professional football player who was an offensive guard in the National Football League (NFL). He played college football for the Western Michigan Broncos and was selected by the Minnesota Vikings in the fourth round of the 2016 NFL draft. Beavers was also a member of several other NFL teams.

== Professional career ==
=== Minnesota Vikings (first stint) ===
Beavers was selected by the Minnesota Vikings in the fourth round (121st overall) of the 2016 NFL draft. On September 3, 2016, he was released by the Vikings and was signed to the practice squad the next day. He was promoted to the active roster on September 27, 2016.

On September 2, 2017, Beavers was waived by the Vikings.

=== New England Patriots ===
On September 4, 2017, Beavers was signed to the New England Patriots' practice squad. He was released on September 16, 2017.

=== Minnesota Vikings (second stint) ===
On November 7, 2017, Beavers was signed to the Vikings' practice squad. He was released on November 14, 2017.

=== Seattle Seahawks ===
On November 28, 2017, Beavers was signed to the Seattle Seahawks' practice squad. He signed a reserve/future contract with the Seahawks on January 2, 2018.

On September 1, 2018, Beavers was waived by the Seahawks.

=== Chicago Bears ===
On November 5, 2018, Beavers was signed to the Chicago Bears practice squad. He was released on January 1, 2019. He signed a reserve/future contract with the Bears on January 16, 2019, but was waived on May 2.

=== San Francisco 49ers ===
On May 6, 2019, Beavers signed with the San Francisco 49ers. He was waived on August 27, 2019.

=== Dallas Renegades ===
Beavers was selected by the Dallas Renegades of the XFL in the 1st round in phase two of the 2020 XFL draft. He had his contract terminated when the league suspended operations on April 10, 2020.

=== Atlanta Falcons ===
Beavers had a tryout with the Atlanta Falcons on August 20, 2020. He was signed to the team's practice squad on September 24, 2020. He signed a reserve/future contract on January 4, 2021.

On August 31, 2021, Beavers was waived by the Falcons and re-signed to the practice squad the next day. He signed a reserve/future contract with the Falcons on January 10, 2022. On May 2, 2022, he was released by the Falcons.

=== Washington Commanders ===
Beavers signed with the Washington Commanders on June 14, 2022. He was placed on injured reserve prior to final roster cuts on August 30, 2022. He was released on October 18.

=== Arlington Renegades ===
Beavers signed with the Arlington Renegades of the XFL in February 2023. He was not part of the roster after the 2024 UFL dispersal draft on January 15, 2024.
