= Brad Sorensen =

American football player (born 1988)

No. 4
- Position: Quarterback

Personal information
- Born: March 13, 1988 (age 38); Grand Terrace, California, U.S.
- Listed height: 6 ft 5 in (1.96 m)
- Listed weight: 230 lb (104 kg)

Career information
- High school: Colton (CA)
- College: Southern Utah
- NFL draft: 2013: 7th round, 221st overall pick

Career history
- San Diego Chargers (2013); Tennessee Titans (2014)*; San Diego Chargers (2014–2015); Minnesota Vikings (2016)*
- * Offseason or practice squad member only
- Stats at Pro Football Reference

Bradley Wilson Sorensen (born March 13, 1988) is an American former professional football player who was a quarterback in the National Football League (NFL). He played college football for the Southern Utah Thunderbirds and was selected by the San Diego Chargers in the seventh round of the 2013 NFL draft.

== College career ==
Sorensen redshirted at Brigham Young University, but transferred to Southern Utah to gain playing time. He started quarterback for the Thunderbirds from 2010 until 2012. He has the school's all-time records in passing yards (9,445) and touchdown passes (61). He also became the school's first 3,000-yard passer in a season, which he did all three years he played at SUU.

== Professional career ==
Pre-draft measurables
Height	Weight	Arm length	Hand span	Wingspan	40-yard dash	10-yard split	20-yard split	20-yard shuttle	Three-cone drill	Vertical jump	Broad jump
6 ft 4 1/2 in (1.94 m)	229 lb (104 kg)	32 1/4 in (0.82 m)	9 1/4 in (0.23 m)	6 ft 3 7/8 in (1.93 m)	4.97 s	1.71 s	2.89 s	4.55 s	7.17 s	29.0 in (0.74 m)	9 ft 4 in (2.84 m)
All values from NFL Combine

The San Diego Chargers selected Sorensen in the seventh round (221st overall) of the 2013 NFL draft. He became Southern Utah's first player to be selected in the NFL draft in school history. He was released on August 29, 2014.

Sorensen had a brief spell with the Tennessee Titans in September 2014, reuniting him with former Chargers Coach Ken Whisenhunt.

Following his release in Tennessee, he was re-signed to the Chargers practice squad in December 2014. He was released again from the Chargers on October 1, 2015. San Diego re-signed Sorensen to their practice squad on October 24. On December 12, 2015, he was promoted to the active roster. On December 14, Sorensen was waived. On December 16 he was re-signed by the Chargers. On December 17, he was once again waived. He was later re-signed on December 18 to the practice squad.

On August 20, 2016, Sorensen signed with the Minnesota Vikings. He was released by the team on August 29, 2016. After starting quarterback Teddy Bridgewater was injured during practice, the Vikings re-signed Sorensen. On September 3, 2016, he was released again by the Vikings when the team traded for Philadelphia Eagles quarterback Sam Bradford.

== Personal life ==
Sorensen was raised by his parents Corey and Roxanne in the city of Grand Terrace, California. Sorensen has four brothers named Trevan, Bryan, Cody, Daniel, and one sister named Emily. The youngest brother, Daniel Sorensen, played college football for the 2013 BYU Cougars and played for the Kansas City Chiefs and New Orleans Saints, winning Super Bowl LIV with the Chiefs.
