= Mike Priefer =

American football coach (born 1966)

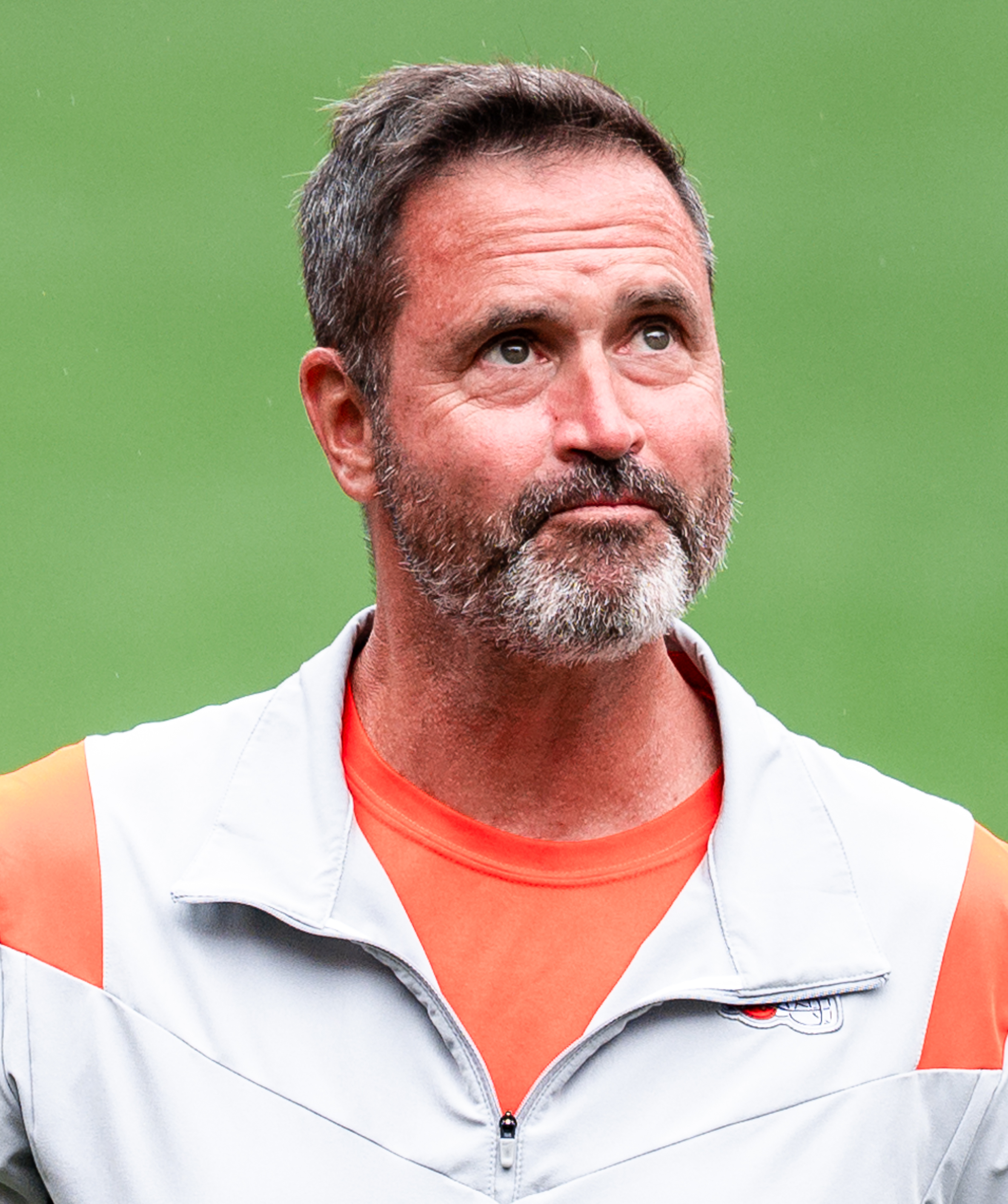
- Priefer in 2021

Pittsburgh Panthers
- Title: Special teams coordinator

Personal information
- Born: August 21, 1966 (age 60); Cleveland, Ohio, U.S.

Career information
- College: Navy

Career history
- Navy (1994–1996) Graduate assistant; Youngstown State (1997–1998) Special teams coordinator, offensive tackles coach, tight ends coach; VMI (1999) Special teams coordinator & linebackers coach; Northern Illinois (2000–2001) Special teams coordinator & defensive tackles coach; Jacksonville Jaguars (2002) Assistant special teams coordinator; New York Giants (2003–2005) Assistant special teams coordinator; Kansas City Chiefs (2006–2008) Special teams coordinator; Denver Broncos (2009–2010) Special teams coordinator; Minnesota Vikings (2011–2018) Special teams coordinator; Cleveland Browns (2019–2022) Special teams coordinator; North Carolina (2025) Special teams coordinator; Pittsburgh (2026–present) Special teams coordinator

Michael Priefer (born August 21, 1966) is an American football coach who is currently the Special teams coordinator for the Pittsburgh Panthers. Previously, he served as the special teams coordinator for the Cleveland Browns of the National Football League (NFL). He has had two decades of pro coaching experience.

Priefer has held coaching positions for Navy, Youngstown State, Virginia Military Institute, and Northern Illinois at the college level. He has also been an assistant for the Minnesota Vikings, Denver Broncos and the Kansas City Chiefs in the NFL and has held coaching positions for the Jacksonville Jaguars and the New York Giants. On January 10, 2021, Priefer served as the acting head coach of the Browns and led them to a 48–37 win against the Pittsburgh Steelers in the AFC wild card game. He was fired by the Browns on February 21, 2023, following four years on the team's staff.

== Early life ==
Priefer is the son of Chuck Priefer, a retired NFL coach and special teams coordinator. He attended the United States Naval Academy, and then served in the United States Navy, serving from 1991 to 1994. He was stationed in the Persian Gulf as a helicopter pilot. He played quarterback and wide receiver at Navy.

== Coaching career ==
=== Early career ===
For the 2002 season, the Jacksonville Jaguars hired Priefer as a Special Teams Coordinator to replace Frank Gansz. At the end of the season, Tom Coughlin, at the time the head coach of the Jaguars, was fired and replaced with Jack Del Rio while Priefer was replaced with Bill Bates.

Priefer moved to the New York Giants in 2003 in a similar role. He worked with head coach Jim Fassel during the 2003 season, and during the 2004 season with new head coach Coughlin.

From 2006 to 2008, Priefer coached for the Kansas City Chiefs in the AFC. He then moved to the Denver Broncos for the next two seasons.

=== Minnesota Vikings ===
In 2011, Priefer was hired as special teams coach for the Minnesota Vikings.

In 2012, Priefer won the Special Teams Coach of the Year, as voted on by his NFL counterparts. It was due to the help of the Vikings Kicker Blair Walsh, who had a very productive 2012 rookie season.

In 2014, Priefer was suspended for three weeks after making a homophobic remark, saying something along the lines of "putting all the gays on an island and nuking it." Former punter Chris Kluwe threatened to sue the Vikings for alleged wrongful termination and religious discrimination by Priefer. Priefer underwent sensitivity training before returning to work.

In 2016, Vikings head coach Mike Zimmer had emergency eye surgery, and Priefer was named the head coach for the week 13 game against the Dallas Cowboys. The Vikings lost 17–15.

=== Cleveland Browns ===
In January 2019, Priefer took a job as the next special teams coordinator for his hometown Cleveland Browns.

On January 5, 2021, Browns head coach Kevin Stefanski tested positive for COVID-19, and Priefer took over as acting head coach. Because Stefanski could not coach the Browns' playoff game against the Pittsburgh Steelers on January 10, 2021, Priefer served as the acting head coach for the game and led them to a 48–37 win. Stefanski returned on January 14 before the Browns' next playoff game. Priefer served as the acting as head coach for the Browns' 2021 week 15 game against the Las Vegas Raiders after Stefanski once again tested positive for COVID-19. With over 20 players unable to play due to COVID-19, Priefer was unable to win a second time as the acting head coach and the Browns fell on a last second field goal in a 14–16 loss. He was fired by the Browns on February 21, 2023, following four years on the team's staff.

=== North Carolina ===
In August 2025, Priefer was hired as the special teams coordinator for the North Carolina Tar Heels. He was fired by North Carolina on December 12.
