= 2021 Minnesota Vikings season =

61st season in franchise history

- Owner: Zygi Wilf
- General manager: Rick Spielman
- Head coach: Mike Zimmer
- Home stadium: U.S. Bank Stadium

Results
- Record: 8–9
- Division place: 2nd NFC North
- Playoffs: Did not qualify
- All-Pros: WR Justin Jefferson (2nd team)
- Pro Bowlers: 5: RB Dalvin Cook (starter); QB Kirk Cousins (alternate); WR Justin Jefferson (bench); T Brian O'Neill (alternate); S Harrison Smith (bench)

Uniform
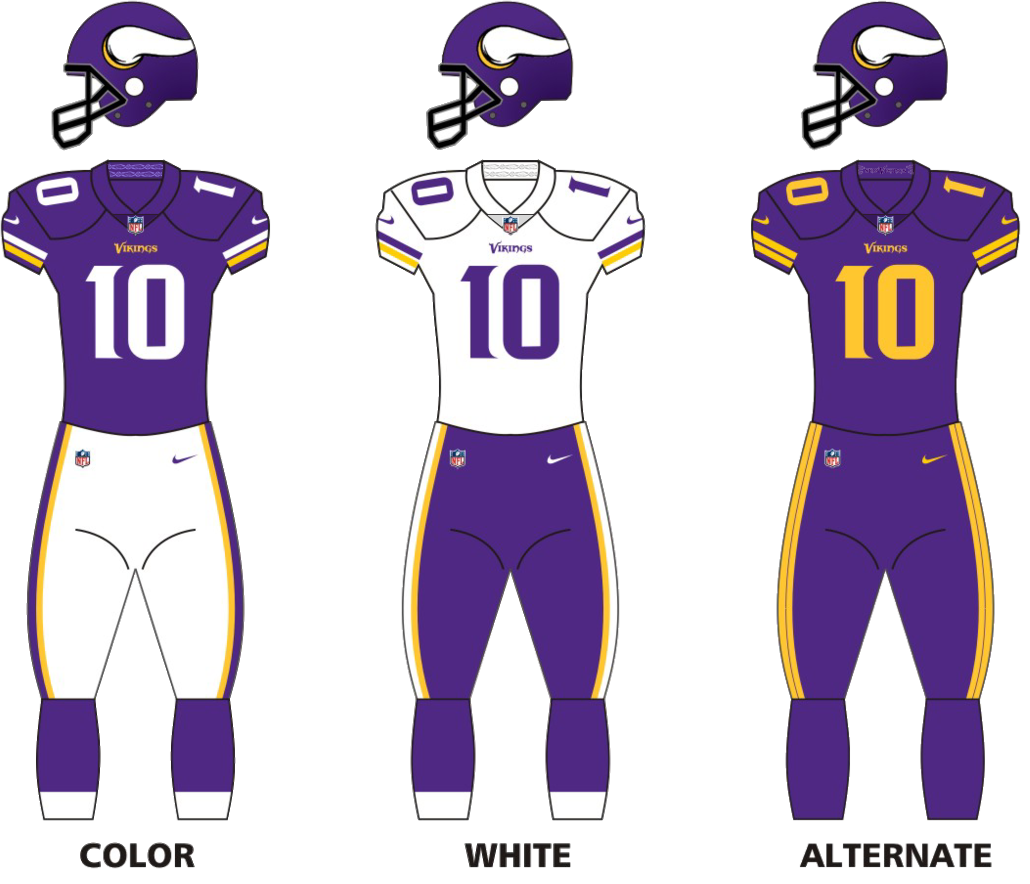

The 2021 season was the Minnesota Vikings' 61st in the National Football League (NFL), their sixth playing home games at U.S. Bank Stadium and their eighth and final under head coach Mike Zimmer. They were eliminated from playoff contention for the second straight season following a Week 17 loss to the Green Bay Packers. The day after the team's last game of the season, the Vikings fired Zimmer and general manager Rick Spielman.

== Draft ==
The Vikings entered the 2021 NFL draft with no second-round pick, having traded it to the Jacksonville Jaguars in exchange for DE Yannick Ngakoue during the 2020 season; however, they picked up an extra third-round selection when they traded Ngakoue to the Baltimore Ravens a few weeks later. They also received an additional fifth-round selection from the Ravens as part of a multi-pick trade during the 2020 draft, as well as additional fourth-round selections from the Chicago Bears (as part of a multi-pick trade) and the Buffalo Bills (as part of the trade that sent Stefon Diggs to the Bills ahead of the 2020 season). The Vikings were also awarded two compensatory selections at the NFL's annual spring owners' meetings; they received one additional pick in the fourth round and one in the sixth round, compensating for the losses of Mackensie Alexander, Jayron Kearse, Andrew Sendejo, Trae Waynes and Stephen Weatherly. On March 19, 2021, the Vikings were forced to forfeit a seventh-round selection due to a salary cap violation relating to a practice squad player during the 2019 season.

On the first day of the draft, the Vikings traded their first-round pick and a fourth-round pick to the New York Jets in exchange for the first-round pick the Jets had received from the Seattle Seahawks (23rd overall) and two additional third-round picks. With their new first-round pick, the Vikings selected offensive tackle Christian Darrisaw, the first player at the position to be taken in the first round by the Vikings since Matt Kalil with the fourth overall pick in 2012. With no second-round pick, the Vikings' draft resumed in the third round with the picks they received from the Jets the previous day and the one they received from Baltimore in exchange for Yannick Ngakoue, in addition to their original third-round pick. With these, they picked quarterback Kellen Mond, linebacker Chazz Surratt, guard Wyatt Davis and defensive end Patrick Jones II. In the fourth round, the Vikings took running back Kene Nwangwu, cornerback Camryn Bynum and defensive end Janarius Robinson, followed by wide receiver Ihmir Smith-Marsette and tight end/punter Zach Davidson in the fifth. The Vikings' final pick of the draft came in the sixth round, when they selected defensive tackle Jaylen Twyman with the 199th overall pick.

2021 Minnesota Vikings draft selections
Round	Selection	Player name	Position	College	Notes
1	14	Traded to the New York Jets (Note: The Vikings traded first- and fourth-round selections (14th and 143rd overall) to the New York Jets in exchange for a first-round selection and two third-round selections (23rd, 66th and 86th overall).)			
1	23	Christian Darrisaw	OT	Virginia Tech	From Seahawks via Jets
2	45	Traded to the Jacksonville Jaguars (Note: The Vikings traded a second-round selection and a conditional 2022 fifth-round selection to the Jacksonville Jaguars in exchange for DE Yannick Ngakoue; the fifth-round selection would have become a fourth-rounder if Ngakoue had been a first-ballot selection for the 2021 Pro Bowl.)			
3	66	Kellen Mond	QB	Texas A&M	From Jets
3	78	Chazz Surratt	LB	North Carolina	
3	86	Wyatt Davis	G	Ohio State	From Jets
3	90	Patrick Jones II	DE	Pittsburgh	From Ravens (Note: The Vikings traded DE Yannick Ngakoue to the Baltimore Ravens in exchange for a third-round selection (90th overall) and a conditional 2022 fifth-round selection; the fifth-round selection would have become a fourth-rounder if Ngakoue had been a first-ballot selection for the 2021 Pro Bowl.)
4	119	Kene Nwangwu	RB	Iowa State	
4	125	Camryn Bynum	CB	California	From Bears (Note: The Vikings traded a 2020 fifth-round selection to the Chicago Bears in exchange for a fourth-round selection (125th overall).)
4	134	Janarius Robinson	DE	Florida State	From Bills (Note: The Vikings traded a 2020 seventh-round selection (239th overall) and WR Stefon Diggs to the Buffalo Bills in exchange for a fourth-round selection, and 2020 first-, fifth- and sixth-round selections (22nd, 155th and 201st overall).)
4	143	Traded to the New York Jets			Compensatory selection
5	157	Ihmir Smith-Marsette	WR	Iowa	
5	168	Zach Davidson	TE	Central Missouri	From Steelers via Ravens (Note: The Vikings traded 2020 sixth- and seventh-round selections (201st and 219th overall) to the Baltimore Ravens in exchange for a fifth-round selection (168th overall) and a 2020 seventh-round selection.)
6	199	Jaylen Twyman	DT	Pittsburgh	
6	223	Traded to the Arizona Cardinals (Note: The Vikings traded a sixth-round selection (223rd overall) to the Arizona Cardinals in exchange for C Mason Cole.)			Compensatory selection
7	—	Selection forfeited (Note: The Vikings forfeited their seventh-round selection as punishment for a salary cap violation involving a 2019 practice squad player.)			

Draft trades

2021 Minnesota Vikings undrafted free agents
Name	Position	College	Ref.
Turner Bernard	LS	San Diego State	
Tuf Borland	LB	Ohio State	
Christian Elliss	LB	Idaho	
Zeandae Johnson	DT	California	
Myron Mitchell	WR	UAB	
Riley Patterson	K	Memphis	
Whop Philyor	WR	Indiana	
Blake Proehl	WR	East Carolina	
A. J. Rose	RB	Kentucky	
Jordon Scott	NT	Oregon	
Zach Von Rosenberg	P	LSU	

== Staff ==
2021 Minnesota Vikings staff
Front office: Owner/chairman – Zygi Wilf; Owner/president – Mark Wilf; Owner/vice chairman – Leonard Wilf; Executive vice president/chief marketing officer – Martin Nance; Chief operating officer – Andrew Miller; General manager – Rick Spielman; Executive vice president of football operations – Rob Brzezinski; Co-director of player personnel – Ryan Monnens; Co-director of player personnel & Director of college scouting – Jamaal Stephenson; Director of pro scouting – Reed Burckhardt; Assistant director of pro scouting – Chris Blanco; National Scout – Chisom Opara; National Scout – Pat Roberts; National Scout – Mike Sholiton; Director of analytics – Scott Kuhn; Consultant – Bud Grant; Head coaches: Head coach – Mike Zimmer; Assistant head coach/co-defensive coordinator/defensive line – Andre Patterson; Offensive coaches: Offensive coordinator – Klint Kubiak; Quarterbacks – Andrew Janocko; Running backs – Kennedy Polamalu; Wide receivers – Keenan McCardell; Tight ends – Brian Pariani; Offensive line – Phil Rauscher; Assistant offensive line – Ben Steele; Senior offensive advisor – Rick Dennison; Offensive quality control/assistant running backs – AC Patterson; Offensive quality control/assistant wide receivers – Christian Jones	Defensive coaches: Co-defensive coordinator/linebackers – Adam Zimmer; Assistant defensive line – Imarjaye Albury; Defensive backs – Karl Scott; Assistant defensive backs/safeties – Roy Anderson; Senior defensive assistant – Paul Guenther; Defensive quality control/assistant linebackers – Sam Siefkes; Special teams coaches: Special teams coordinator – Ryan Ficken; Assistant special teams – Robert Steeples; Strength and conditioning: Head strength and conditioning – Josh Hingst; Assistant strength and conditioning – Derik Keyes; Assistant strength and conditioning – Marquis Johnson

== Final roster ==
2021 Minnesota Vikings roster
Quarterbacks (QB): 8 Kirk Cousins; 14 Sean Mannion; 11 Kellen Mond; Running backs (RB): 33 Dalvin Cook; 31 Wayne Gallman; 30 C. J. Ham FB; 25 Alexander Mattison; 26 Kene Nwangwu; Wide receivers (WR): 85 Dan Chisena; 18 Justin Jefferson; 17 K. J. Osborn; 15 Ihmir Smith-Marsette; 12 Dede Westbrook; Tight ends (TE): 83 Tyler Conklin; 40 Zach Davidson; 82 Ben Ellefson; 35 Luke Stocker	Offensive linemen (OL): 56 Garrett Bradbury C; 64 Blake Brandel T; 72 Ezra Cleveland G; 71 Christian Darrisaw T; 51 Wyatt Davis G; 78 Dakota Dozier G; 69 Rashod Hill T; 75 Brian O'Neill T; 74 Oli Udoh G; Defensive linemen (DL): 93 Patrick Jones II DE; 92 James Lynch DT; 58 Michael Pierce DT; 90 Sheldon Richardson DT; 94 Dalvin Tomlinson DT; 96 Armon Watts DT; 79 Kenny Willekes DE; 98 D. J. Wonnum DE	Linebackers (LB): 55 Anthony Barr OLB; 45 Troy Dye MLB; 48 Blake Lynch OLB; 41 Chazz Surratt OLB; 59 Nick Vigil OLB; Defensive backs (DB): 24 Mackensie Alexander CB; 29 Kris Boyd CB; 27 Cameron Dantzler CB; 44 Josh Metellus SS; 7 Patrick Peterson CB; 22 Harrison Smith SS; 23 Xavier Woods FS; Special teams (ST): 3 Jordan Berry P; 42 Andrew DePaola LS; 1 Greg Joseph K	Practice squad: 62 Cole Banwart G; 34 Jake Bargas FB; 47 Tuf Borland OLB; 46 Myles Dorn FS; 68 Kyle Hinton G; 9 Trishton Jackson WR; 91 T. Y. McGill DT; 21 Bryan Mills CB; 87 Myron Mitchell WR; 39 Parry Nickerson CB; 61 Timon Parris T; 36 A. J. Rose RB; 50 T. J. Smith DT; 5 Tye Smith CB; 66 Eddie Yarbrough DE; Reserve: -- Chad Beebe WR (IR); 73 Tashawn Bower DE (COVID-19); 43 Camryn Bynum FS (COVID-19); 52 Mason Cole C (IR); 57 Ryan Connelly OLB (IR); 97 Everson Griffen DE (NF-Ill.); 20 Harrison Hand CB (COVID-19); 89 Chris Herndon TE (COVID-19); 99 Danielle Hunter DE (IR); 81 Bisi Johnson WR (IR); 54 Eric Kendricks MLB (COVID-19); 13 Blake Proehl WR (IR); 95 Janarius Robinson DE (IR); 66 Jordon Scott DT (IR); 84 Irv Smith Jr. TE (IR); -- Nate Stanley QB (IR); 19 Adam Thielen WR (IR); 76 Jaylen Twyman DT (NF-Inj.); Rookies in italics 49 active, 18 reserve, 15 practice squad

== Preseason ==
=== Schedule ===
The Vikings' preliminary preseason schedule was announced on May 12. The exact dates and times were finalized on June 3.

Week	Date	Opponent	Result	Record	Venue	Attendance	Recap
1	August 14	Denver Broncos	L 6–33	0–1	U.S. Bank Stadium	66,028	Recap
2	August 21	Indianapolis Colts	L 10–12	0–2	U.S. Bank Stadium	66,022	Recap
3	August 27	at Kansas City Chiefs	L 25–28	0–3	Arrowhead Stadium	72,680	Recap

=== Game summaries ===
==== Week 1: vs. Denver Broncos ====
Week 1: Denver Broncos at Minnesota Vikings – Game summary

Quarter	1	2	3	4	Total
Broncos	9	17	7	0	33
Vikings	3	3	0	0	6

at U.S. Bank Stadium, Minneapolis, Minnesota

- Date: August 14
- Game time: 3:00 p.m. CDT
- Game weather: None (indoor stadium)
- Game attendance: 66,028
- Referee: Alex Kemp (55)
- TV announcers (KMSP): Paul Allen, Pete Bercich and Ben Leber
- Recap, Game Book

Game information

First quarter

- DEN – Penalty on Dakota Dozier enforced in the end zone for a safety, 8:45. Broncos 2–0.
- DEN – K. J. Hamler 80-yard pass from Drew Lock (Brandon McManus kick), 8:28. Broncos 9–0. Drive: 1 play, 80 yards, 0:17.
- MIN – Greg Joseph 34-yard field goal, 3:13. Broncos 9–3. Drive: 11 plays, 61 yards, 5:15.

Second quarter

- DEN – Trinity Benson 4-yard pass from Drew Lock (Brandon McManus kick), 12:59. Broncos 16–3. Drive: 10 plays, 85 yards, 5:14.
- DEN – Patrick Surtain II 30-yard interception return (Brandon McManus kick), 11:49. Broncos 23–3.
- DEN – Brandon McManus 34-yard field goal, 2:49. Broncos 26–3. Drive: 10 plays, 50 yards, 6:15.
- MIN – Greg Joseph 25-yard field goal, 0:00. Broncos 26–6. Drive: 12 plays, 69 yards, 2:49.

Third quarter

- DEN – Trinity Benson 4-yard pass from Teddy Bridgewater (Brandon McManus kick), 10:30. Broncos 33–6. Drive: 7 plays, 40 yards, 4:30.

Fourth quarter

- No scoring plays

Top passers

- DEN – Drew Lock – 5/7, 151 yards, 2 TD
- MIN – Kellen Mond – 6/16, 53 yards

Top rushers

- DEN – Damarea Crockett – 16 rushes, 59 yards
- MIN – A. J. Rose – 25 rushes, 100 yards

Top receivers

- DEN – K. J. Hamler – 2 receptions, 105 yards, TD
- MIN – A. J. Rose – 1 reception, 18 yards

==== Week 2: vs. Indianapolis Colts ====
Week 2: Indianapolis Colts at Minnesota Vikings – Game summary

Quarter	1	2	3	4	Total
Colts	3	3	3	3	12
Vikings	7	3	0	0	10

at U.S. Bank Stadium, Minneapolis, Minnesota

- Date: August 21
- Game time: 7:00 p.m. CDT
- Game weather: None (indoor stadium)
- Game attendance: 66,022
- Referee: Clay Martin (19)
- TV announcers (KMSP): Paul Allen, Pete Bercich and Ben Leber
- Recap, Game Book

Game information

First quarter

- IND – Rodrigo Blankenship 47-yard field goal, 6:00. Colts 3–0. Drive: 9 plays, 44 yards, 4:54.
- MIN – Troy Dye 33-yard interception return (Greg Joseph kick), 3:45. Vikings 7–3.

Second quarter

- IND – Eddy Piñeiro 31-yard field goal, 14:53. Vikings 7–6. Drive: 9 plays, 62 yards, 3:52.
- MIN – Greg Joseph 49-yard field goal, 0:45. Vikings 10–6. Drive: 9 plays, 55 yards, 1:16.

Third quarter

- IND – Eddy Piñeiro 50-yard field goal, 3:37. Vikings 10–9. Drive: 10 plays, 55 yards, 5:58.

Fourth quarter

- IND – Eddy Piñeiro 28-yard field goal, 6:22. Colts 12–10. Drive: 13 plays, 69 yards, 6:30.

Top passers

- IND – Jacob Eason – 16/27, 132 yards
- MIN – Jake Browning – 6/15, 82 yards

Top rushers

- IND – Jordan Wilkins – 5 rushes, 20 yards
- MIN – Ameer Abdullah – 6 rushes, 35 yards

Top receivers

- IND – Dezmon Patmon – 4 receptions, 60 yards
- MIN – Chad Beebe – 2 receptions, 47 yards

==== Week 3: at Kansas City Chiefs ====
Week 3: Minnesota Vikings at Kansas City Chiefs – Game summary

Quarter	1	2	3	4	Total
Vikings	3	0	7	15	25
Chiefs	14	7	7	0	28

at Arrowhead Stadium, Kansas City, Missouri

- Date: August 27
- Game time: 7:00 p.m. CDT
- Game weather: Sunny, 91 °F (33 °C)
- Game attendance: 72,680
- Referee: Shawn Hochuli (83)
- TV announcers (KMSP): Paul Allen, Pete Bercich and Ben Leber
- Recap

Game information

First quarter

- KC – Tyreek Hill 35-yard pass from Patrick Mahomes (Harrison Butker kick), 12:22. Chiefs 7–0. Drive: 5 plays, 79 yards, 2:38.
- MIN – Greg Joseph 26-yard field goal, 7:55. Chiefs 7–3. Drive: 10 plays, 67 yards, 4:27.
- KC – Blake Bell 5-yard pass from Patrick Mahomes (Harrison Butker kick), 3:06. Chiefs 14–3. Drive: 10 plays, 75 yards, 4:49.

Second quarter

- KC – Marcus Kemp 23-yard pass from Shane Buechele (Harrison Butker kick), 0:26. Chiefs 21–3. Drive: 12 plays, 88 yards, 1:37.

Third quarter

- MIN – A. J. Rose 32-yard run (Greg Joseph kick), 9:23. Chiefs 21–10. Drive: 7 plays, 69 yards, 3:34.
- KC – Derrick Gore 56-yard pass from Shane Buechele (Harrison Butker kick), 8:05. Chiefs 28–10. Drive: 3 plays, 75 yards, 1:18.

Fourth quarter

- MIN – Parry Nickerson 10-yard interception return (Kellen Mond–Myron Mitchell pass), 8:24. Chiefs 28–18.
- MIN – A. J. Rose 1-yard run (Greg Joseph kick), 1:24. Chiefs 28–25. Drive: 8 plays, 89 yards, 2:19.

Top passers

- MIN – Kellen Mond – 16/23, 196 yards, INT
- KC – Shane Buechele – 20/33, 231 yards, 2 TD, INT

Top rushers

- MIN – A. J. Rose – 6 rushes, 41 yards, 2 TD
- KC – Derrick Gore – 6 rushes, 26 yards

Top receivers

- MIN – K. J. Osborn – 3 receptions, 68 yards
- KC – Derrick Gore – 5 receptions, 80 yards, TD

== Regular season ==
=== Schedule ===
In addition to their usual six games home and away against their NFC North rivals, the Vikings would also play games against each of the teams from the NFC West and the AFC North, as well as the two teams that, like the Vikings, finished in third place in their divisions in the NFC East and NFC South in 2020: the Dallas Cowboys and the Carolina Panthers. Following an agreement between the league and the National Football League Players Association to expand the regular season schedule to 17 games, the Vikings also played against the Los Angeles Chargers, one of the third-placed teams from the American Football Conference (AFC) whom they were not originally scheduled to play in 2021. The Vikings' 2021 schedule was announced on May 12.

Week	Date	Opponent	Result	Record	Venue	Attendance	Recap
1	September 12	at Cincinnati Bengals	**L** 24−27 (OT)	0−1	Paul Brown Stadium	56,525	Recap
2	September 19	at Arizona Cardinals	**L** 33−34	0–2	State Farm Stadium	60,115	Recap
3	September 26	Seattle Seahawks	**W** 30–17	1–2	U.S. Bank Stadium	66,729	Recap
4	October 3	Cleveland Browns	**L** 7–14	1–3	U.S. Bank Stadium	66,703	Recap
5	October 10	**Detroit Lions**	**W** 19–17	2–3	U.S. Bank Stadium	66,538	Recap
6	October 17	at Carolina Panthers	**W** 34–28 (OT)	3–3	Bank of America Stadium	72,104	Recap
7	Bye						
8	October 31	Dallas Cowboys	**L** 16–20	3–4	U.S. Bank Stadium	66,633	Recap
9	November 7	at Baltimore Ravens	**L** 31–34 (OT)	3–5	M&T Bank Stadium	70,599	Recap
10	November 14	at Los Angeles Chargers	**W** 27–20	4–5	SoFi Stadium	70,240	Recap
11	November 21	**Green Bay Packers**	**W** 34–31	5–5	U.S. Bank Stadium	66,959	Recap
12	November 28	at San Francisco 49ers	**L** 26–34	5–6	Levi's Stadium	71,493	Recap
13	December 5	at **Detroit Lions**	**L** 27–29	5–7	Ford Field	45,691	Recap
14	December 9	Pittsburgh Steelers	**W** 36–28	6–7	U.S. Bank Stadium	66,718	Recap
15	December 20	at **Chicago Bears**	**W** 17–9	7–7	Soldier Field	60,082	Recap
16	December 26	Los Angeles Rams	**L** 23–30	7–8	U.S. Bank Stadium	66,708	Recap
17	January 2	at **Green Bay Packers**	**L** 10–37	7–9	Lambeau Field	77,832	Recap
18	January 9	**Chicago Bears**	**W** 31–17	8–9	U.S. Bank Stadium	66,625	Recap

Note: Intra-division opponents are in bold text.

=== Game summaries ===
==== Week 1: at Cincinnati Bengals ====
Week 1: Minnesota Vikings at Cincinnati Bengals – Game summary

Quarter	1	2	3	4	OT	Total
Vikings	0	7	7	10	0	**24**
**Bengals**	0	14	7	3	3	**27**

at Paul Brown Stadium, Cincinnati, Ohio

- Date: September 12
- Game time: 1:00 p.m. EDT/12:00 p.m. CDT
- Game weather: Mostly sunny, 84 °F (29 °C)
- Game attendance: 56,525
- Referee: Adrian Hill (29)
- TV announcers (Fox): Chris Myers, Daryl Johnston and Jen Hale
- Recap, Game Book

Game information

**First quarter**

- No scoring plays.

**Second quarter**

- MIN – Adam Thielen 5-yard pass from Kirk Cousins (Greg Joseph kick), 6:39. Vikings 7–0. **Drive: 14 plays, 91 yards, 8:21.**
- CIN – Tee Higgins 2-yard pass from Joe Burrow (Evan McPherson kick), 1:47. Tied 7–7. **Drive: 9 plays, 75 yards, 4:52.**
- CIN – Ja'Marr Chase 50-yard pass from Joe Burrow (Evan McPherson kick), 0:35. Bengals 14–7. **Drive: 4 plays, 75 yards, 0:36.**

**Third quarter**

- CIN – Joe Mixon 2-yard run (Evan McPherson kick), 9:15. Bengals 21–7. **Drive: 11 plays, 75 yards, 5:45.**
- MIN – Adam Thielen 24-yard pass from Kirk Cousins (Greg Joseph kick), 2:24 Bengals 21–14. **Drive: 4 plays, 30 yards, 0:51.**

**Fourth quarter**

- CIN – Evan McPherson 53-yard field goal, 14:13. Bengals 24–14. **Drive: 7 plays, 40 yards, 3:11.**
- MIN – Dalvin Cook 1-yard run (Greg Joseph kick), 9:23. Bengals 24–21. **Drive: 10 plays, 75 yards, 4:50.**
- MIN – Greg Joseph 53-yard field goal, 0:00. Tied 24–24. **Drive: 9 plays, 60 yards, 1:48.**

**Overtime**

- CIN – Evan McPherson 33-yard field goal, 0:00. Bengals 27–24. **Drive: 7 plays, 46 yards, 1:48.**

**Top passers**

- MIN – Kirk Cousins – 36/49, 351 yards, 2 TD
- CIN – Joe Burrow – 20/27, 261 yards, 2 TD

**Top rushers**

- MIN – Dalvin Cook – 20 rushes, 61 yards, TD
- CIN – Joe Mixon – 29 rushes, 127 yards, TD

**Top reveivers**

- MIN – Adam Thielen – 9 receptions, 92 yards, 2 TD
- CIN – Ja'Marr Chase – 5 receptions, 101 yards, TD

This was head coach Mike Zimmer's first return to Cincinnati since 2013, his last season with the Bengals before departing to become the Vikings head coach. Zimmer served as defensive coordinator for the Bengals under then-head coach Marvin Lewis from 2008 to 2013.

==== Week 2: at Arizona Cardinals ====
Week 2: Minnesota Vikings at Arizona Cardinals – Game summary

Quarter	1	2	3	4	Total
Vikings	14	9	7	3	**33**
**Cardinals**	7	17	7	3	**34**

at State Farm Stadium, Glendale, Arizona

- Date: September 19
- Game time: 3:05 p.m. CDT/1:05 p.m. MST
- Game weather: None (retractable roof closed)
- Game attendance: 60,115
- Referee: Bill Vinovich (52)
- TV announcers (Fox): Gus Johnson, Aqib Talib and Megan Olivi
- Recap, Game Book

Game information

**First quarter**

- MIN – K. J. Osborn 64-yard pass from Kirk Cousins (Greg Joseph kick), 14:16. Vikings 7–0. **Drive: 2 plays, 75 yards, 0:44.**
- ARI – DeAndre Hopkins 15-yard pass from Kyler Murray (Matt Prater kick), 5:49. Tied 7–7. **Drive: 9 plays, 73 yards, 4:36.**
- MIN – Adam Thielen 7-yard pass from Kirk Cousins (Greg Joseph kick), 0:24. Vikings 14–7. **Drive: 9 plays, 75 yards, 5:25.**

**Second quarter**

- MIN – Justin Jefferson 14-yard pass from Kirk Cousins (kick failed, wide right), 8:56. Vikings 20–7. **Drive: 9 plays, 84 yards, 5:18.**
- ARI – Kyler Murray 12-yard run (Matt Prater kick), 3:15. Vikings 20–14. **Drive: 10 plays, 75 yards, 5:41.**
- ARI – Rondale Moore 77-yard pass from Kyler Murray (Matt Prater kick), 1:33. Cardinals 21–20. **Drive: 1 play, 77 yards, 0:13.**
- MIN – Greg Joseph 52-yard field goal, 0:21. Vikings 23–21. **Drive: 8 plays, 41 yards, 1:12.**
- ARI – Matt Prater 62-yard field goal, 0:00. Cardinals 24–23. **Drive: 3 plays, 22 yards, 0:21.**

**Third quarter**

- MIN – Nick Vigil 36-yard interception return (Greg Joseph kick), 14:00. Vikings 30–24.
- ARI – A. J. Green 9-yard pass from Kyler Murray (Matt Prater kick), 9:11. Cardinals 31–30. **Drive: 8 plays, 75 yards, 4:49.**

**Fourth quarter**

- MIN – Greg Joseph 52-yard field goal, 14:12. Vikings 33–31. **Drive: 10 plays, 35 yards, 4:17.**
- ARI – Matt Prater 27-yard field goal, 4:25. Cardinals 34–33. **Drive: 10 plays, 55 yards, 4:26.**

**Top passers**

- MIN – Kirk Cousins – 22/32, 244 yards, 3 TD
- ARI – Kyler Murray – 29/36, 400 yards, 3 TD, 2 INT

**Top rushers**

- MIN – Dalvin Cook – 22 rushes, 131 yards
- ARI – Chase Edmonds – 8 rushes, 46 yards

**Top receivers**

- MIN – K. J. Osborn – 5 reception, 91 yards, TD
- ARI – Rondale Moore – 7 receptions, 114 yards, TD

==== Week 3: vs. Seattle Seahawks ====
Week 3: Seattle Seahawks at Minnesota Vikings – Game summary

Quarter	1	2	3	4	Total
Seahawks	10	7	0	0	**17**
**Vikings**	7	14	3	6	**30**

at U.S. Bank Stadium, Minneapolis, Minnesota

- Date: September 26
- Game time: 3:25 p.m. CDT
- Game weather: None (indoor stadium)
- Game attendance: 66,729
- Referee: Clay Martin (19)
- TV announcers (Fox): Kevin Kugler, Mark Sanchez and Laura Okmin
- Recap, Game Book

Game information

**First quarter**

- SEA – DK Metcalf 10-yard pass from Russell Wilson (Jason Myers kick), 10:26. Seahawks 7–0. **Drive: 9 plays, 75 yards, 4:34.**
- MIN – Tyler Conklin 7-yard pass from Kirk Cousins (Greg Joseph kick), 6:37. Tied 7–7. **Drive: 7 plays, 70 yards, 3:49.**
- SEA – Jason Myers 53-yard field goal, 0:27. Seahawks 10–7. **Drive: 11 plays, 40 yards, 6:10.**

**Second quarter**

- SEA – Chris Carson 30-yard run (Jason Myers kick), 11:12. Seahawks 17–7. **Drive: 6 plays, 76 yards, 3:33.**
- MIN – Adam Thielen 15-yard pass from Kirk Cousins (Greg Joseph kick), 5:28. Seahawks 17–14. **Drive: 9 plays, 85 yards, 5:44.**
- MIN – Justin Jefferson 3-yard pass from Kirk Cousins (Greg Joseph kick), 0:16. Vikings 21–17. **Drive: 12 plays, 66 yards, 2:58.**

**Third quarter**

- MIN – Greg Joseph 43-yard field goal, 6:34. Vikings 24–17. **Drive: 16 plays, 50 yards, 8:26.**

**Fourth quarter**

- MIN – Greg Joseph 34-yard field goal, 13:47. Vikings 27–17. **Drive: 11 plays, 70 yards, 5:01.**
- MIN – Greg Joseph 20-yard field goal, 4:31. Vikings 30–17. **Drive: 12 plays, 88 yards, 7:08.**

**Top passers**

- SEA – Russell Wilson – 23/32, 298 yards, TD
- MIN – Kirk Cousins – 30/38, 323 yards, 3 TD

**Top rushers**

- SEA – Chris Carson – 12 rushes, 80 yards, TD
- MIN – Alexander Mattison – 26 rushes, 112 yards

**Top receivers**

- SEA – DK Metcalf – 6 receptions, 107 yards, TD
- MIN – Justin Jefferson – 9 receptions, 118 yards, TD

==== Week 4: vs. Cleveland Browns ====
Week 4: Cleveland Browns at Minnesota Vikings – Game summary

Quarter	1	2	3	4	Total
**Browns**	0	11	0	3	**14**
Vikings	7	0	0	0	**7**

at U.S. Bank Stadium, Minneapolis, Minnesota

- Date: October 3
- Game time: 12:00 p.m. CDT
- Game weather: None (indoor stadium)
- Game attendance: 66,703
- Referee: Tony Corrente (99)
- TV announcers (CBS): Kevin Harlan, Trent Green and Melanie Collins
- Recap, Game Book

Game information

**First quarter**

- MIN – Justin Jefferson 12-yard pass from Kirk Cousins (Greg Joseph kick), 7:26. Vikings 7–0. **Drive: 14 plays, 75 yards, 7:34.**

**Second quarter**

- CLE – Kareem Hunt 1-yard run (Baker Mayfield–Andy Janovich pass), 1:16. Browns 8–7. **Drive: 18 plays, 64 yards, 8:39.**
- CLE – Chase McLaughlin 48-yard field goal, 0:02. Browns 11–7. **Drive: 8 plays, 34 yards, 0:43.**

**Third quarter**

- No scoring plays.

**Fourth quarter**

- CLE – Chase McLaughlin 53-yard field goal, 6:16. Browns 14–7. **Drive: 7 plays, 36 yards, 3:29.**

**Top passers**

- CLE – Baker Mayfield – 15/33, 155 yards
- MIN – Kirk Cousins – 20/38, 203 yards, TD, INT

**Top rushers**

- CLE – Nick Chubb – 21 rushes, 100 yards
- MIN – Dalvin Cook – 9 rushes, 34 yards

**Top receivers**

- CLE – Rashard Higgins – 4 receptions, 63 yards
- MIN – Justin Jefferson – 6 receptions, 84 yards, TD

==== Week 5: vs. Detroit Lions ====
Week 5: Detroit Lions at Minnesota Vikings – Game summary

Quarter	1	2	3	4	Total
Lions	3	3	0	11	**17**
**Vikings**	3	10	0	6	**19**

at U.S. Bank Stadium, Minneapolis, Minnesota

- Date: October 10
- Game time: 12:00 p.m. CDT
- Game weather: None (indoor stadium)
- Game attendance: 66,538
- Referee: Clete Blakeman (34)
- TV announcers (Fox): Chris Myers, Daryl Johnston and Jen Hale
- Recap, Game Book

Game information

**First quarter**

- DET – Austin Seibert 39-yard field goal, 10:34. Lions 3–0. **Drive: 10 plays, 54 yards, 4:26.**
- MIN – Greg Joseph 38-yard field goal, 6:30. Tied 3–3. **Drive: 10 plays, 55 yards, 4:04.**

**Second quarter**

- MIN – Greg Joseph 38-yard field goal, 9:50. Vikings 6–3. **Drive: 11 plays, 45 yards, 6:04.**
- MIN – Alexander Mattison 15-yard pass from Kirk Cousins (Greg Joseph kick), 2:20. Vikings 13–3. **Drive: 8 plays, 88 yards, 4:16.**
- DET – Austin Seibert 52-yard field goal, 0:41. Vikings 13–6. **Drive: 9 plays, 41 yards, 1:39.**

**Third quarter**

- No scoring plays.

**Fourth quarter**

- MIN – Greg Joseph 55-yard field goal, 4:28. Vikings 16–6. **Drive: 10 plays, 43 yards, 5:11.**
- DET – Austin Seibert 40-yard field goal, 2:30. Vikings 16–9. **Drive: 6 plays, 39 yards, 0:47.**
- DET – D'Andre Swift 7-yard run (Jared Goff–KhaDarel Hodge pass), 0:37. Lions 17–16. **Drive: 3 plays, 20 yards, 1:19.**
- MIN – Greg Joseph 54-yard field goal, 0:00. Vikings 19–17. **Drive: 5 plays, 46 yards, 0:37.**

**Top passers**

- DET – Jared Goff – 21/35, 203 yards, INT
- MIN – Kirk Cousins – 25/34, 275 yards, TD, INT

**Top rushers**

- DET – Jamaal Williams – 13 rushes, 57 yards
- MIN – Alexander Mattison – 25 rushes, 113 yards

**Top receivers**

- DET – Amon-Ra St. Brown – 7 receptions, 65 yards
- MIN – Justin Jefferson – 7 receptions, 124 yards

==== Week 6: at Carolina Panthers ====
Week 6: Minnesota Vikings at Carolina Panthers – Game summary

Quarter	1	2	3	4	OT	Total
**Vikings**	6	6	13	3	6	**34**
Panthers	7	3	7	11	0	**28**

at Bank of America Stadium, Charlotte, North Carolina

- Date: October 17
- Game time: 1:00 p.m. EDT/12:00 p.m. CDT
- Game weather: Sunny, 63 °F (17 °C)
- Game attendance: 72,104
- Referee: Craig Wrolstad (4)
- TV announcers (Fox): Kenny Albert, Jonathan Vilma and Sara Walsh
- Recap, Game Book

Game information

**First quarter**

- MIN – Greg Joseph 25-yard field goal, 11:52. Vikings 3–0. **Drive: 7 plays, 16 yards, 2:56.**
- CAR – Chuba Hubbard 2-yard run (Zane Gonzalez kick), 8:27. Panthers 7–3. **Drive: 2 plays, 18 yards, 0:42.**
- MIN – Greg Joseph 25-yard field goal, 2:57. Panthers 7–6. **Drive: 11 plays, 46 yards, 5:30.**

**Second quarter**

- MIN – Chris Herndon 2-yard pass from Kirk Cousins (run failed), 10:59. Vikings 12–7. **Drive: 9 plays, 85 yards, 4:08.**
- CAR – Zane Gonzalez 47-yard field goal, 4:20. Vikings 12–10. **Drive: 10 plays, 32 yards, 4:23.**

**Third quarter**

- CAR – Kenny Robinson 4-yard return of blocked punt (Zane Gonzalez kick), 6:49. Panthers 17–12.
- MIN – Dalvin Cook 16-yard run (pass failed), 4:00. Vikings 18–17. **Drive: 5 plays, 79 yards, 2:49.**
- MIN – Adam Thielen 5-yard pass from Kirk Cousins (Greg Joseph kick), 2:24. Vikings 25–17. **Drive: 4 plays, 39 yards, 1:27.**

**Fourth quarter**

- MIN – Greg Joseph 38-yard field goal, 10:15. Vikings 28–17. **Drive: 8 plays, 63 yards, 4:37.**
- CAR – Zane Gonzalez 23-yard field goal, 4:41. Vikings 28–20. **Drive: 7 plays, 55 yards, 2:19.**
- CAR – Robby Anderson 7-yard pass from Sam Darnold (Sam Darnold–Tommy Tremble pass), 0:42. Tied 28–28. **Drive: 11 plays, 96 yards, 1:27.**

**Overtime**

- MIN – K. J. Osborn 27-yard pass from Kirk Cousins, 5:48. Vikings 34–28. **Drive: 9 plays, 75 yards, 4:12.**

**Top passers**

- MIN – Kirk Cousins – 33/48, 373 yards, 3 TD
- CAR – Sam Darnold – 17/41, 207 yards, TD, INT

**Top rushers**

- MIN – Dalvin Cook – 29 rushes, 140 yards, TD
- CAR – Chuba Hubbard – 16 rushes, 61 yards, TD

**Top receivers**

- MIN – Adam Thielen – 11 receptions, 126 yards, TD
- CAR – D. J. Moore – 5 receptions, 73 yards

==== Week 8: vs. Dallas Cowboys ====
Week 8: Dallas Cowboys at Minnesota Vikings – Game summary

Quarter	1	2	3	4	Total
**Cowboys**	0	3	10	7	**20**
Vikings	7	3	3	3	**16**

at U.S. Bank Stadium, Minneapolis, Minnesota

- Date: October 31
- Game time: 7:20 p.m. CDT
- Game weather: None (indoor stadium)
- Game attendance: 66,633
- Referee: Scott Novak (1)
- TV announcers (NBC): Al Michaels, Cris Collinsworth, Michele Tafoya and Terry McAulay
- Recap, Game Book

Game information

**First quarter**

- MIN – Adam Thielen 20-yard pass from Kirk Cousins (Greg Joseph kick), 11:49. Vikings 7–0. **Drive: 7 plays, 75 yards, 3:11.**

**Second quarter**

- DAL – Greg Zuerlein 38-yard field goal, 6:09. Vikings 7–3. **Drive: 12 plays, 60 yards, 6:25.**
- MIN – Greg Joseph 45-yard field goal, 1:44. Vikings 10–3. **Drive: 11 plays, 49 yards, 4:25.**

**Third quarter**

- DAL – Cedrick Wilson Jr. 73-yard pass from Cooper Rush (Greg Zuerlein kick), 14:07. Tied 10–10. **Drive: 3 plays, 75 yards, 0:53.**
- MIN – Greg Joseph 40-yard field goal, 6:31. Vikings 13–10. **Drive: 7 plays, 33 yards, 3:01.**
- DAL – Greg Zuerlein 39-yard field goal, 0:04. Tied 13–13. **Drive: 5 plays, 51 yards, 2:07.**

**Fourth quarter**

- MIN – Greg Joseph 24-yard field goal, 2:51. Vikings 16–13. **Drive: 10 plays, 69 yards, 5:17.**
- DAL – Amari Cooper 5-yard pass from Cooper Rush (Greg Zuerlein kick), 0:51. Cowboys 20–16. **Drive: 8 plays, 75 yards, 2:00.**

**Top passers**

- DAL – Cooper Rush – 24/40, 325 yards, 2 TD, INT
- MIN – Kirk Cousins – 23/35, 184 yards, TD

**Top rushers**

- DAL – Ezekiel Elliott – 16 rushes, 50 yards
- MIN – Dalvin Cook – 18 rushes, 78 yards

**Top receivers**

- DAL – Amari Cooper – 8 receptions, 122 yards, TD
- MIN – Adam Thielen – 6 receptions, 78 yards, TD

==== Week 9: at Baltimore Ravens ====
Week 9: Minnesota Vikings at Baltimore Ravens – Game summary

Quarter	1	2	3	4	OT	Total
Vikings	7	10	7	7	0	**31**
**Ravens**	3	7	7	14	3	**34**

at M&T Bank Stadium, Baltimore, Maryland

- Date: November 7
- Game time: 1:00 p.m. EST/12:00 p.m. CST
- Game weather: Partly cloudy, 58 °F (14 °C)
- Game attendance: 70,599
- Referee: Carl Cheffers (51)
- TV announcers (Fox): Adam Amin, Mark Schlereth and Shannon Spake
- Recap, Game Book

Game information

**First quarter**

- BAL – Justin Tucker 37-yard field goal, 10:34. Ravens 3–0. **Drive: 11 plays, 56 yards, 4:26.**
- MIN – Justin Jefferson 50-yard pass from Kirk Cousins (Greg Joseph kick), 8:32. Vikings 7–3. **Drive: 5 plays, 79 yards, 2:02.**

**Second quarter**

- MIN – Kirk Cousins 1-yard run (Greg Joseph kick), 13:15. Vikings 14–3. **Drive: 10 plays, 94 yards, 6:29.**
- MIN – Greg Joseph 36-yard field goal, 1:25. Vikings 17–3. **Drive: 4 plays, −1 yards, 0:16.**
- BAL – Devonta Freeman 5-yard pass from Lamar Jackson (Justin Tucker kick), 0:19. Vikings 17–10. **Drive: 6 plays, 75 yards, 1:06.**

**Third quarter**

- MIN – Kene Nwangwu 98-yard kickoff return (Greg Joseph kick), 14:47. Vikings 24–10. **Drive: 0 plays, 0 yards, 0:13.**
- BAL – Patrick Ricard 1-yard pass from Lamar Jackson (Justin Tucker kick), 8:39. Vikings 24–17. **Drive: 10 plays, 72 yards, 6:08.**

**Fourth quarter**

- BAL – Devin Duvernay 5-yard pass from Lamar Jackson (Justin Tucker kick), 9:19. Tied 24–24. **Drive: 18 plays, 82 yards, 10:17.**
- BAL – Le'Veon Bell 1-yard run (Justin Tucker kick), 3:29. Ravens 31–24. **Drive: 7 plays, 61 yards, 4:16.**
- MIN – Adam Thielen 1-yard pass from Kirk Cousins (Greg Joseph kick), 1:03. Tied 31–31. **Drive: 10 plays, 75 yards, 2:26.**

**Overtime**

- BAL – Justin Tucker 36-yard field goal, 0:16. Ravens 34–31. **Drive: 10 plays, 72 yards, 5:01.**

**Top passers**

- MIN – Kirk Cousins – 17/28, 187 yards, 2 TD
- BAL – Lamar Jackson – 27/41, 266 yards, 3 TD, 2 INT

**Top rushers**

- MIN – Dalvin Cook – 17 rushes, 110 yards
- BAL – Lamar Jackson – 21 rushes, 120 yards

**Top receivers**

- MIN – Justin Jefferson – 3 receptions, 69 yards, TD
- BAL – Marquise Brown – 9 receptions, 116 yards

==== Week 10: at Los Angeles Chargers ====
Week 10: Minnesota Vikings at Los Angeles Chargers – Game summary

Quarter	1	2	3	4	Total
**Vikings**	0	13	7	7	**27**
Chargers	0	10	7	3	**20**

at SoFi Stadium, Inglewood, California

- Date: November 14
- Game time: 3:05 p.m. CST/1:05 p.m. PST
- Game weather: None (retractable roof closed)
- Game attendance: 70,240
- Referee: Clay Martin (19)
- TV announcers (Fox): Kevin Kugler, Mark Sanchez and Laura Okmin
- Recap, Game Book

Game information

**First quarter**

- No scoring plays.

**Second quarter**

- MIN – Greg Joseph 46-yard field goal, 14:12. Vikings 3–0. **Drive: 10 plays, 59 yards, 6:00.**
- LAC – Dustin Hopkins 46-yard field goal, 11:28. Tied 3–3. **Drive: 6 plays, 48 yards, 2:44.**
- MIN – Greg Joseph 30-yard field goal, 6:38. Vikings 6–3. **Drive: 11 plays, 50 yards, 4:50.**
- MIN – Tyler Conklin 5-yard pass from Kirk Cousins (Greg Joseph kick), 3:26. Vikings 13–3. **Drive: 6 plays, 31 yards, 3:00.**
- LAC – Larry Rountree III 1-yard run (Dustin Hopkins kick), 1:30. Vikings 13–10. **Drive: 8 plays, 75 yards, 1:56.**

**Third quarter**

- LAC – Austin Ekeler 2-yard pass from Justin Herbert (Dustin Hopkins kick), 10:40. Chargers 17–13. **Drive: 10 plays, 75 yards, 4:20.**
- MIN – Tyler Conklin 1-yard pass from Kirk Cousins (Greg Joseph kick), 2:33. Vikings 20–17. **Drive: 9 plays, 66 yards, 3:52.**

**Fourth quarter**

- MIN – Dalvin Cook 1-yard run (Greg Joseph kick), 9:29. Vikings 27–17. **Drive: 12 plays, 68 yards, 7:04.**
- LAC – Dustin Hopkins 24-yard field goal, 4:36. Vikings 27–20. **Drive: 12 plays, 69 yards, 4:53.**

**Top passers**

- MIN – Kirk Cousins – 25/37, 294 yards, 2 TD
- LAC – Justin Herbert – 20/34, 195 yards, TD, INT

**Top rushers**

- MIN – Dalvin Cook – 24 rushes, 94 yards, TD
- LAC – Austin Ekeler – 11 rushes, 44 yards

**Top receivers**

- MIN – Justin Jefferson – 9 receptions, 143 yards
- LAC – Keenan Allen – 8 receptions, 98 yards

==== Week 11: vs. Green Bay Packers ====
Week 11: Green Bay Packers at Minnesota Vikings – Game summary

Quarter	1	2	3	4	Total
Packers	3	7	7	14	**31**
**Vikings**	9	7	7	11	**34**

at U.S. Bank Stadium, Minneapolis, Minnesota

- Date: November 21
- Game time: 12:00 p.m. CST
- Game weather: None (indoor stadium)
- Game attendance: 66,959
- Referee: Shawn Hochuli (83)
- TV announcers (Fox): Kevin Burkhardt, Greg Olsen and Pam Oliver
- Recap, Game Book

Game information

**First quarter**

- GB – Mason Crosby 54-yard field goal, 13:17. Packers 3–0. **Drive: 5 plays, 39 yards, 1:43.**
- MIN – Greg Joseph 51-yard field goal, 9:14. Tied 3–3. **Drive: 7 plays, 42 yards, 4:03.**
- MIN – Dalvin Cook 1-yard run (kick failed, wide right), 1:48. Vikings 9–3. **Drive: 6 plays, 84 yards, 3:20.**

**Second quarter**

- MIN – Adam Thielen 10-yard pass from Kirk Cousins (Greg Joseph kick), 7:37. Vikings 16–3. **Drive: 7 plays, 78 yards, 3:38.**
- GB – Josiah Deguara 25-yard pass from Aaron Rodgers (Mason Crosby kick), 0:30. Vikings 16–10. **Drive: 9 plays, 74 yards, 3:48.**

**Third quarter**

- MIN – Justin Jefferson 9-yard pass from Kirk Cousins (Greg Joseph kick), 8:26. Vikings 23–10. **Drive: 14 plays, 75 yards, 6:34.**
- GB – Davante Adams 10-yard pass from Aaron Rodgers (Mason Crosby kick), 3:35. Vikings 23–17. **Drive: 7 plays, 75 yards, 4:51.**

**Fourth quarter**

- GB – Davante Adams 18-yard pass from Aaron Rodgers (Mason Crosby kick), 7:49. Packers 24–23. **Drive: 12 plays, 94 yards, 7:02.**
- MIN – Justin Jefferson 23-yard pass from Kirk Cousins (Dalvin Cook run), 2:17. Vikings 31–24. **Drive: 12 plays, 79 yards, 5:32.**
- GB – Marquez Valdes-Scantling 75-yard pass from Aaron Rodgers (Mason Crosby kick), 2:08. Tied 31–31. **Drive: 1 play, 75 yards, 0:09.**
- MIN – Greg Joseph 29-yard field goal, 0:00. Vikings 34–31. **Drive: 8 plays, 64 yards, 2:08.**

**Top passers**

- GB – Aaron Rodgers – 23/33, 385 yards, 4 TD
- MIN – Kirk Cousins – 24/35, 341 yards, 3 TD

**Top rushers**

- GB – A. J. Dillon – 11 rushes, 53 yards
- MIN – Dalvin Cook – 22 rushes, 86 yards, TD

**Top receivers**

- GB – Marquez Valdes-Scantling – 4 receptions, 123 yards, TD
- MIN – Justin Jefferson – 8 receptions, 169 yards, 2 TD

==== Week 12: at San Francisco 49ers ====
Week 12: Minnesota Vikings at San Francisco 49ers – Game summary

Quarter	1	2	3	4	Total
Vikings	7	7	12	0	**26**
**49ers**	7	7	20	0	**34**

at Levi's Stadium, Santa Clara, California

- Date: November 28
- Game time: 3:25 p.m. CST/1:25 p.m. PST
- Game weather: Clear, 67 °F (19 °C)
- Game attendance: 71,493
- Referee: Brad Rogers (126)
- TV announcers (Fox): Kenny Albert, Jonathan Vilma and Sara Walsh
- Recap, Game Book

Game information

**First quarter**

- MIN – Adam Thielen 2-yard pass from Kirk Cousins (Greg Joseph kick), 8:27. Vikings 7–0. **Drive: 8 plays, 49 yards, 3:33.**
- SF – Deebo Samuel 20-yard run (Robbie Gould kick), 5:31. Tied 7–7. **Drive: 6 plays, 75 yards, 2:56.**

**Second quarter**

- MIN – Adam Thielen 20-yard pass from Kirk Cousins (Greg Joseph kick), 12:42. Vikings 14–7. **Drive: 6 plays, 80 yards, 2:50.**
- SF – Jauan Jennings 3-yard pass from Jimmy Garoppolo (Robbie Gould kick), 0:18. Tied 14–14. **Drive: 15 plays, 85 yards, 8:20.**

**Third quarter**

- SF – Deebo Samuel 3-yard run (Robbie Gould kick), 11:31. 49ers 21–14. **Drive: 6 plays, 75 yards, 3:29.**
- SF – Elijah Mitchell 2-yard run (Robbie Gould kick), 11:09. 49ers 28–14. **Drive: 1 play, 2 yards, 0:04.**
- MIN – Alexander Mattison 6-yard run (kick failed, wide right), 8:28. 49ers 28–20. **Drive: 5 plays, 75 yards, 2:41.**
- SF – Robbie Gould 46-yard field goal, 4:58. 49ers 31–20. **Drive: 7 plays, 47 yards, 3:30.**
- MIN – Kene Nwangwu 99-yard kickoff return (pass failed), 4:46. 49ers 31–26. **Drive: 0 plays, 0 yards, 0:12.**
- SF – Robbie Gould 22-yard field goal, 0:09. 49ers 34–26. **Drive: 4 plays, 5 yards, 1:21.**

**Fourth quarter**

- No scoring plays.

**Top passers**

- MIN – Kirk Cousins – 20/32, 238 yards, 2 TD, INT
- SF – Jimmy Garoppolo – 17/26, 230 yards, TD, INT

**Top rushers**

- MIN – Dalvin Cook – 10 rushes, 39 yards
- SF – Elijah Mitchell – 27 rushes, 133 yards, TD

**Top receivers**

- MIN – Justin Jefferson – 4 receptions, 83 yards
- SF – Brandon Aiyuk – 3 receptions, 91 yards

==== Week 13: at Detroit Lions ====
Week 13: Minnesota Vikings at Detroit Lions – Game summary

Quarter	1	2	3	4	Total
Vikings	6	0	9	12	**27**
**Lions**	0	20	3	6	**29**

at Ford Field, Detroit, Michigan

- Date: December 5
- Game time: 1:00 p.m. EST/12:00 p.m. CST
- Game weather: None (indoor stadium)
- Game attendance: 45,691
- Referee: Craig Wrolstad (4)
- TV announcers (CBS): Spero Dedes and Jay Feely
- Recap, Game Book

Game information

**First quarter**

- MIN – Greg Joseph 41-yard field goal, 6:49. Vikings 3–0. **Drive: 5 plays, 18 yards, 2:51.**
- MIN – Greg Joseph 31-yard field goal, 0:59. Vikings 6–0. **Drive: 10 plays, 53 yards, 4:11.**

**Second quarter**

- DET – T. J. Hockenson 9-yard pass from Jared Goff (Riley Patterson kick), 13:50. Lions 7–6. **Drive: 5 plays, 69 yards, 2:09.**
- DET – Brock Wright 23-yard pass from Jared Goff (Riley Patterson kick), 9:45. Lions 14–6. **Drive: 3 plays, 56 yards, 1:23.**
- DET – Riley Patterson 31-yard field goal, 1:33. Lions 17–6. **Drive: 13 plays, 77 yards, 5:33.**
- DET – Riley Patterson 41-yard field goal, 0:06. Lions 20–6. **Drive: 5 plays, 32 yards, 0:26.**

**Third quarter**

- MIN – Greg Joseph 31-yard field goal, 9:26. Lions 20–9. **Drive: 11 plays, 60 yards, 4:47.**
- MIN – Alexander Mattison 8-yard run (run failed), 6:13. Lions 20–15. **Drive: 5 plays, 67 yards, 1:36.**
- DET – Riley Patterson 49-yard field goal, 1:56. Lions 23–15. **Drive: 8 plays, 44 yards, 4:17.**

**Fourth quarter**

- MIN – K. J. Osborn 5-yard pass from Kirk Cousins (run failed), 11:57. Lions 23–21. **Drive: 10 plays, 75 yards, 4:59.**
- MIN – Justin Jefferson 3-yard pass from Kirk Cousins (pass failed), 1:50. Vikings 27–23. **Drive: 6 plays, 19 yards, 2:11.**
- DET – Amon-Ra St. Brown 11-yard pass from Jared Goff, 0:00. Lions 29–27. **Drive: 14 plays, 75 yards, 1:50.**

**Top passers**

- MIN – Kirk Cousins – 30/40, 340 yards, 2 TD
- DET – Jared Goff – 25/41, 296 yards, 3 TD, INT

**Top rushers**

- MIN – Alexander Mattison – 22 rushes, 90 yards, TD
- DET – Jamaal Williams – 17 rushes, 71 yards

**Top receivers**

- MIN – Justin Jefferson – 11 receptions, 182 yards, TD
- DET – Amon-Ra St. Brown – 10 receptions, 86 yards, TD

==== Week 14: vs. Pittsburgh Steelers ====
Week 14: Pittsburgh Steelers at Minnesota Vikings – Game summary

Quarter	1	2	3	4	Total
Steelers	0	0	7	21	**28**
**Vikings**	6	17	6	7	**36**

at U.S. Bank Stadium, Minneapolis, Minnesota

- Date: December 9
- Game time: 7:20 p.m. CST
- Game weather: None (indoor stadium)
- Game attendance: 66,718
- Referee: Clete Blakeman (34)
- TV announcers (Fox/NFLN/Prime Video): Joe Buck, Troy Aikman, Erin Andrews and Kristina Pink
- Recap, Game Book

Game information

**First quarter**

- MIN – Justin Jefferson 14-yard pass from Kirk Cousins (kick failed, wide right), 3:31. Vikings 6–0. **Drive: 5 plays, 61 yards, 2:01.**

**Second quarter**

- MIN – Greg Joseph 38-yard field goal, 14:43. Vikings 9–0. **Drive: 7 plays, 37 yards, 2:02.**
- MIN – Dalvin Cook 29-yard run (Greg Joseph kick), 9:55. Vikings 16–0. **Drive: 5 plays, 78 yards, 3:06.**
- MIN – Dalvin Cook 7-yard run (Greg Joseph kick), 2:20. Vikings 23–0. **Drive: 12 plays, 60 yards, 5:19.**

**Third quarter**

- MIN – Greg Joseph 42-yard field goal, 9:36. Vikings 26–0. **Drive: 7 plays, 10 yards, 2:49.**
- MIN – Greg Joseph 25-yard field goal, 6:15. Vikings 29–0. **Drive: 6 plays, 23 yards, 2:07.**
- PIT – Najee Harris 3-yard pass from Ben Roethlisberger (Chris Boswell kick), 2:11. Vikings 29–7. **Drive: 10 plays, 75 yards, 4:04.**

**Fourth quarter**

- PIT – Najee Harris 1-yard run (Chris Boswell kick), 14:49. Vikings 29–14. **Drive: 7 plays, 42 yards, 2:14.**
- PIT – James Washington 30-yard pass from Ben Roethlisberger (pass failed), 12:11. Vikings 29–20. **Drive: 3 plays, 69 yards, 1:06.**
- MIN – K. J. Osborn 62-yard pass from Kirk Cousins (Greg Joseph kick), 10:51. Vikings 36–20. **Drive: 3 plays, 75 yards, 1:20.**
- PIT – Pat Freiermuth 15-yard pass from Ben Roethlisberger (Ben Roethlisberger–Diontae Johnson pass), 4:14. Vikings 36–28. **Drive: 2 plays, 21 yards, 0:44.**

**Top passers**

- PIT – Ben Roethlisberger – 28/40, 308 yards, 3 TD, INT
- MIN – Kirk Cousins – 14/31, 216 yards, 2 TD, 2 INT

**Top rushers**

- PIT – Najee Harris – 20 rushes, 94 yards, TD
- MIN – Dalvin Cook – 27 rushes, 205 yards, 2 TD

**Top receivers**

- PIT – Chase Claypool – 8 receptions, 93 yards
- MIN – K. J. Osborn – 3 receptions, 83 yards, TD

==== Week 15: at Chicago Bears ====
Week 15: Minnesota Vikings at Chicago Bears – Game summary

Quarter	1	2	3	4	Total
**Vikings**	7	3	7	0	**17**
Bears	0	3	0	6	**9**

at Soldier Field, Chicago, Illinois

- Date: December 20
- Game time: 7:15 p.m. CST
- Game weather: Clear, 38 °F (3 °C)
- Game attendance: 60,082
- Referee: Scott Novak (1)
- TV announcers (ESPN): Steve Levy, Brian Griese, Louis Riddick and Lisa Salters
- Recap, Game Book

Game information

**First quarter**

- MIN – Justin Jefferson 12-yard pass from Kirk Cousins (Greg Joseph kick), 5:03. Vikings 7–0. **Drive: 8 plays, 54 yards, 4:37.**

**Second quarter**

- MIN – Greg Joseph 37-yard field goal, 13:28. Vikings 10–0. **Drive: 8 plays, 34 yards, 4:09.**
- CHI – Cairo Santos 34-yard field goal, 1:33. Vikings 10–3. **Drive: 12 plays, 49 yards, 5:55.**

**Third quarter**

- MIN – Ihmir Smith-Marsette 7-yard pass from Kirk Cousins (Greg Joseph kick), 5:51. Vikings 17–3. **Drive: 12 plays, 77 yards, 5:41.**

**Fourth quarter**

- CHI – Jesper Horsted 19-yard pass from Justin Fields, 0:00. Vikings 17–9. **Drive: 9 plays, 80 yards, 1:52.**

**Top passers**

- MIN – Kirk Cousins – 12/24, 87 yards, 2 TD, INT
- CHI – Justin Fields – 26/39, 285 yards, TD

**Top rushers**

- MIN – Dalvin Cook – 28 rushes, 89 yards
- CHI – David Montgomery – 18 rushes, 60 yards

**Top receivers**

- MIN – Justin Jefferson – 4 receptions, 47 yards, TD
- CHI – Cole Kmet – 6 receptions, 71 yards

==== Week 16: vs. Los Angeles Rams ====
Week 16: Los Angeles Rams at Minnesota Vikings – Game summary

Quarter	1	2	3	4	Total
**Rams**	7	6	7	10	**30**
Vikings	0	3	10	10	**23**

at U.S. Bank Stadium, Minneapolis, Minnesota

- Date: December 26
- Game time: 12:00 p.m. CST
- Game weather: None (indoor stadium)
- Game attendance: 66,708
- Referee: John Hussey (35)
- TV announcers (Fox): Adam Amin, Mark Schlereth and Shannon Spake
- Recap, Game Book

Game information

**First quarter**

- LAR – Sony Michel 1-yard run (Matt Gay kick), 7:13. Rams 7–0. **Drive: 12 plays, 70 yards, 5:44.**

**Second quarter**

- LAR – Matt Gay 32-yard field goal, 6:37. Rams 10–0. **Drive: 10 plays, 56 yards, 5:31.**
- MIN – Greg Joseph 23-yard field goal, 2:34. Rams 10–3. **Drive: 4 plays, 7 yards, 1:28.**
- LAR – Matt Gay 31-yard field goal, 0:11. Rams 13–3. **Drive: 13 plays, 62 yards, 2:23.**

**Third quarter**

- MIN – Alexander Mattison 2-yard run (Greg Joseph kick), 11:01. Rams 13–10. **Drive: 1 play, 2 yards, 0:06.**
- LAR – Brandon Powell 61-yard punt return (Matt Gay kick), 7:06. Rams 20–10.
- MIN – Greg Joseph 24-yard field goal, 1:31. Rams 20–13. **Drive: 12 plays, 83 yards, 5:35.**

**Fourth quarter**

- LAR – Odell Beckham Jr. 7-yard pass from Matthew Stafford (Matt Gay kick), 11:37. Rams 27–13. **Drive: 11 plays, 75 yards, 4:54.**
- MIN – K. J. Osborn 6-yard pass from Kirk Cousins (Greg Joseph kick), 8:21. Rams 27–20. **Drive: 7 plays, 75 yards, 3:16.**
- LAR – Matt Gay 24-yard field goal, 2:03. Rams 30–20. **Drive: 13 plays, 69 yards, 6:18.**
- MIN – Greg Joseph 44-yard field goal, 0:32. Rams 30–23. **Drive: 8 plays, 49 yards, 1:31.**

**Top passers**

- LAR – Matthew Stafford – 21/37, 197 yards, TD, 3 INT
- MIN – Kirk Cousins – 27/38, 315 yards, TD, INT

**Top rushers**

- LAR – Sony Michel – 27 rushes, 131 yards, TD
- MIN – Alexander Mattison – 13 rushes, 41 yards, TD

**Top receivers**

- LAR – Cooper Kupp – 10 receptions, 109 yards
- MIN – Justin Jefferson – 8 receptions, 116 yards

==== Week 17: at Green Bay Packers ====
Week 17: Minnesota Vikings at Green Bay Packers – Game summary

Quarter	1	2	3	4	Total
Vikings	0	3	7	0	**10**
**Packers**	3	17	10	7	**37**

at Lambeau Field, Green Bay, Wisconsin

- Date: January 2
- Game time: 7:20 p.m. CST
- Game weather: Clear, 11 °F (−12 °C)
- Game attendance: 77,832
- Referee: Clay Martin (19)
- TV announcers (NBC): Mike Tirico, Cris Collinsworth, Kathryn Tappen and Terry McAulay
- Recap, Game Book

Game information

**First quarter**

- GB – Mason Crosby 35-yard field goal, 11:48. Packers 3–0. **Drive: 9 plays, 58 yards, 3:12.**

**Second quarter**

- GB – Mason Crosby 36-yard field goal, 9:11. Packers 6–0. **Drive: 8 plays, 61 yards, 4:18.**
- GB – Allen Lazard 20-yard pass from Aaron Rodgers (Mason Crosby kick), 4:11. Packers 13–0. **Drive: 6 plays, 66 yards, 3:21.**
- GB – Davante Adams 11-yard pass from Aaron Rodgers (Mason Crosby kick), 1:05. Packers 20–0. **Drive: 6 plays, 64 yards, 1:03.**
- MIN – Greg Joseph 51-yard field goal, 0:00. Packers 20–3. **Drive: 9 plays, 42 yards, 1:05.**

**Third quarter**

- GB – A. J. Dillon 4-yard run (Mason Crosby kick), 9:28. Packers 27–3. **Drive: 7 plays, 37 yards, 3:51.**
- GB – Mason Crosby 37-yard field goal, 3:22. Packers 30–3. **Drive: 8 plays, 32 yards, 3:48.**
- MIN – K. J. Osborn 14-yard pass from Sean Mannion (Greg Joseph kick), 0:00. Packers 30–10. **Drive: 8 plays, 65 yards, 3:22.**

**Fourth quarter**

- GB – A. J. Dillon 7-yard run (Mason Crosby kick), 8:41. Packers 37–10. **Drive: 11 plays, 70 yards, 6:19.**

**Top passers**

- MIN – Sean Mannion – 22/36, 189 yards, TD
- GB – Aaron Rodgers – 29/38, 288 yards, 2 TD

**Top rushers**

- MIN – Sean Mannion – 2 rushes, 14 yards
- GB – Aaron Jones – 8 rushes, 76 yards

**Top receivers**

- MIN – Justin Jefferson – 6 receptions, 58 yards
- GB – Davante Adams – 11 receptions, 136 yards, TD

==== Week 18: vs. Chicago Bears ====
Week 18: Chicago Bears at Minnesota Vikings – Game summary

Quarter	1	2	3	4	Total
Bears	3	11	3	0	**17**
**Vikings**	0	3	7	21	**31**

at U.S. Bank Stadium, Minneapolis, Minnesota

- Date: January 9
- Game time: 12:00 p.m. CST
- Game weather: None (indoor stadium)
- Game attendance: 66,625
- Referee: Brad Allen (122)
- TV announcers (Fox): Gus Johnson, Aqib Talib and Megan Olivi
- Recap, Game Book

Game information

**First quarter**

- CHI – Cairo Santos 43-yard field goal, 12:09. Bears 3–0. **Drive: 7 plays, 39 yards, 2:51.**

**Second quarter**

- CHI – Cairo Santos 46-yard field goal, 4:55. Bears 6–0. **Drive: 8 plays, 36 yards, 4:03.**
- CHI – Damien Williams 23-yard pass from Andy Dalton (Andy Dalton-Allen Robinson pass), 0:31. Bears 14–0. **Drive: 9 plays, 67 yards, 2:39.**
- MIN – Greg Joseph 39-yard field goal, 0:00. Bears 14–3. **Drive: 4 plays, 55 yards, 0:31.**

**Third quarter**

- MIN – Ihmir Smith-Marsette 44-yard pass from Kirk Cousins (Greg Joseph kick), 12:24. Bears 14–10. **Drive: 6 plays, 75 yards, 2:36.**
- CHI – Cairo Santos 42-yard field goal, 1:37. Bears 17–10. **Drive: 9 plays, 34 yards, 4:10.**

**Fourth quarter**

- MIN – Justin Jefferson 45-yard pass from Kirk Cousins (Greg Joseph kick), 13:35. Tied 17–17. **Drive: 6 plays, 75 yards, 3:02.**
- MIN – K. J. Osborn 21-yard pass from Kirk Cousins (Greg Joseph kick), 8:04. Vikings 24–17. **Drive: 6 plays, 87 yards, 2:49.**
- MIN – Patrick Peterson 66-yard interception return (Greg Joseph kick), 4:54. Vikings 31–17.

**Top passers**

- CHI – Andy Dalton – 33/48, 325 yards, TD, 2 INT
- MIN – Kirk Cousins – 14/22, 250 yards, 3 TD

**Top rushers**

- CHI – David Montgomery – 20 rushes, 72 yards
- MIN – Dalvin Cook – 14 rushes, 79 yards

**Top receivers**

- CHI – Darnell Mooney – 12 reception, 126 yards
- MIN – Justin Jefferson – 5 receptions, 107 yards, TD

=== Standings ===
==== Division ====
NFC North
	W	L	T	PCT	DIV	CONF	PF	PA	STK
^{(1)} Green Bay Packers	13	4	0	.765	4–2	9–3	450	371	L1
Minnesota Vikings	8	9	0	.471	4–2	6–6	425	426	W1
Chicago Bears	6	11	0	.353	2–4	4–8	311	407	L1
Detroit Lions	3	13	1	.206	2–4	3–9	325	467	W1

==== Conference ====
NFC
#	Team	Division	W	L	T	PCT	DIV	CONF	SOS	SOV	STK
**Division winners**
1 (Note: Green Bay finished ahead of Tampa Bay based on conference record (9–3 vs. 8–4), claiming the No. 1 seed.)	Green Bay Packers	North	13	4	0	.765	4–2	9–3	.479	.480	L1
2	Tampa Bay Buccaneers	South	13	4	0	.765	4–2	8–4	.467	.443	W3
3 (Note: Dallas claimed the No. 3 seed over LA Rams based on conference record (10–2 vs. 8–4).)	Dallas Cowboys	East	12	5	0	.706	6–0	10–2	.488	.431	W1
4	Los Angeles Rams	West	12	5	0	.706	3–3	8–4	.483	.409	L1
**Wild cards**
5	Arizona Cardinals	West	11	6	0	.647	4–2	7–5	.490	.492	L1
6	San Francisco 49ers	West	10	7	0	.588	2–4	7–5	.500	.438	W2
7 (Note: Philadelphia finished ahead of New Orleans based on head-to-head victory, claiming the 7th and final playoff spot.)	Philadelphia Eagles	East	9	8	0	.529	3–3	7–5	.469	.350	L1
**Did not qualify for the postseason**
8	New Orleans Saints	South	9	8	0	.529	4–2	7–5	.512	.516	W2
9	Minnesota Vikings	North	8	9	0	.471	4–2	6–6	.507	.434	W1
10 (Note: Washington finished ahead of Atlanta and Seattle based on head-to-head victories.)	Washington Football Team	East	7	10	0	.412	2–4	6–6	.529	.420	W1
11 (Note: Seattle finished ahead of Atlanta based on win percentage in common games (4–2 vs. 3–3 against: San Francisco, New Orleans, Jacksonville, Washington, and Detroit).)	Seattle Seahawks	West	7	10	0	.412	3–3	4–8	.519	.424	W2
12	Atlanta Falcons	South	7	10	0	.412	2–4	4–8	.472	.315	L2
13	Chicago Bears	North	6	11	0	.353	2–4	4–8	.524	.373	L1
14	Carolina Panthers	South	5	12	0	.294	2–4	3–9	.509	.412	L7
15	New York Giants	East	4	13	0	.235	1–5	3–9	.536	.485	L6
16	Detroit Lions	North	3	13	1	.206	2–4	3–9	.528	.627	W1
**Tiebreakers** (Note: When breaking ties for three or more teams under the NFL's rules, they are first broken within divisions, then comparing only the highest-ranked remaining team from each division.)

== Statistics ==
=== Team leaders ===
Category	Player(s)	Total
Passing yards	Kirk Cousins	4,221
Passing touchdowns	Kirk Cousins	33
Rushing yards	Dalvin Cook	1,159
Rushing touchdowns	Dalvin Cook	6
Receptions	Justin Jefferson	108
Receiving yards	Justin Jefferson	1,616
Receiving touchdowns	Justin Jefferson; Adam Thielen	10
Points	Greg Joseph	135
Kickoff return yards	Kene Nwangwu	579
Punt return yards	Dede Westbrook	183
Tackles	Eric Kendricks	143
Sacks	D. J. Wonnum	8.0
Interceptions	Anthony Barr; Xavier Woods	3
Forced fumbles	Bashaud Breeland; Armon Watts; Xavier Woods	2

Source: Pro-Football-Reference.com

=== League rankings ===
Category	Total yards	Yards per game	NFL rank (out of 32)
Passing offense	4,238	249.3	11th
Rushing offense	1,930	113.5	17th
Total offense	6,168	362.8	12th
Passing defense	4,300	252.9	28th
Rushing defense	2,222	130.7	26th
Total defense	6,522	383.6	30th

Source: ProFootballReference.com

== Pro Bowl ==
Three Vikings players were named to the 2022 Pro Bowl when the rosters were announced on December 20, 2021. On offense, Dalvin Cook led the voting among NFC running backs to reach his third straight Pro Bowl, while WR Justin Jefferson made it two in a row; on defense, Harrison Smith received the most fan votes among NFC safeties to go to his sixth Pro Bowl. Those three were joined by T Brian O'Neill on January 26, 2022, after Tampa Bay Buccaneers tackle Tristan Wirfs was ruled out due to injury. Quarterback Kirk Cousins was added to the NFC roster on January 31 following the withdrawal of Packers QB Aaron Rodgers due to injury.
