= Camryn Bynum =

American football player (born 1998)

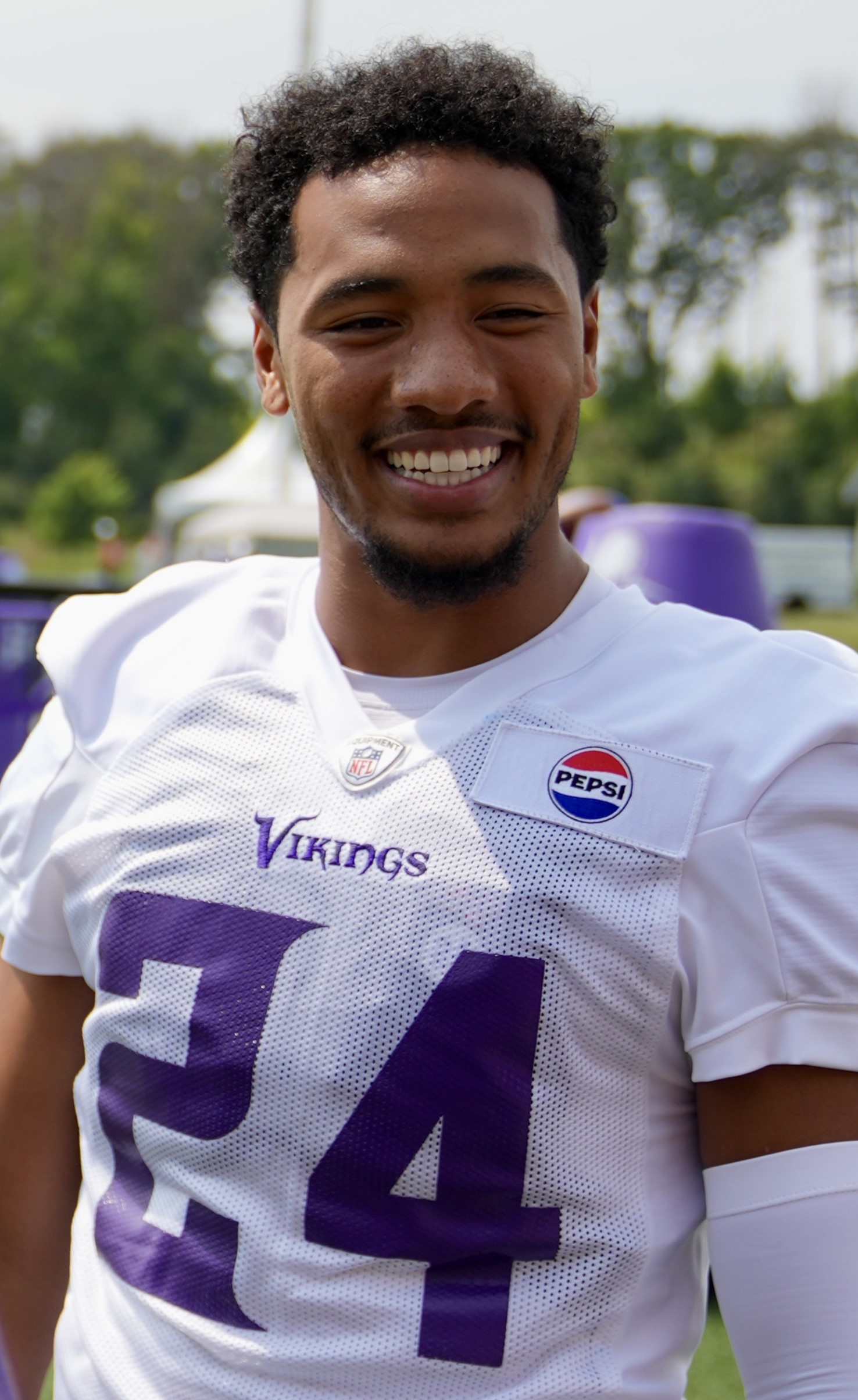
- Bynum with the Minnesota Vikings in 2024

No. 0 – Indianapolis Colts
- Position: Safety
- Roster status: Active

Personal information
- Born: July 19, 1998 (age 28); Corona, California, U.S.
- Listed height: 6 ft 0 in (1.83 m)
- Listed weight: 200 lb (91 kg)

Career information
- High school: Centennial (Corona)
- College: California (2016–2020)
- NFL draft: 2021: 4th round, 125th overall pick

Career history
- Minnesota Vikings (2021–2024); Indianapolis Colts (2025–present)

Awards and highlights
- First-team All-Pac-12 (2020); Second-team All-Pac-12 (2019)

Career NFL statistics as of 2025
- Total tackles: 423
- Sacks: 2.5
- Forced fumbles: 4
- Fumble recoveries: 5
- Pass deflections: 36
- Interceptions: 12
- Stats at Pro Football Reference

Camryn Bynum (born July 19, 1998) is an American professional football safety for the Indianapolis Colts of the National Football League (NFL). He played college football for the California Golden Bears and was selected by the Minnesota Vikings in the fourth round of the 2021 NFL draft.

== Early life ==
Bynum was born on July 19, 1998, in Corona, California, and attended Centennial High School. Initially considered undersized for football, he did not join the varsity team until his junior year. As a senior, Bynum recorded 70 tackles and nine passes defended.

== College career ==
A three-star cornerback recruit, Bynum committed to California on July 1, 2015, over offers from Boise State, Boston College, Colorado State, Nevada, and Washington State, among others.

After redshirting his true freshman season, Bynum became a starter during his redshirt freshman season and finished the year with 58 tackles, eight passes broken up and two interceptions and was named Cal's Most Valuable Freshman. Bynum recorded 48 tackles and 2.5 tackles for loss with 12 passes broken up and two interceptions as a redshirt sophomore. As a redshirt junior, Bynum recorded 63 tackles, 3.0 tackles for loss, one interception, and nine passes broken up and was named second-team All-Pac-12 Conference. Following the announcement that Pac-12 would postpone the 2020 season, Bynum announced that he would opt out of the season in order to focus on preparing for the 2021 NFL draft. Bynum reversed his decision to opt out after the Pac-12 announced that they would resume fall football.

Bynum was the only Golden Bear to start in all 42 games from 2017 to 2020, starting every game at cornerback. He graduated from UC Berkeley in December 2020 with a degree in business.

== Professional career ==
=== Pre-draft ===
The majority of NFL analysts projected Bynum to be a fourth to sixth round pick in the 2021 NFL Draft. Thor Nystrom of Yahoo! ranked Bynum as the 17th best cornerback prospect in the draft. CBSSports.com's NFL draft columnist Chris Trapasso ranked Bynum as the 13th best cornerback (56th overall) prospect available in the draft.

External videos
- Camryn Bynum College Highlights

"Bynum from Cal is a spring-loaded man-to-man cornerback who produced in all four seasons at Cal. Newsome is my No. 1 "trust the tape" prospect, because his pro day was a disaster. On film, he's a running back in space and in the return game who smoothly creates separation at the short to intermediate levels on a regular basis.."

— Chris Trapasso (CBS Sports)

Pre-draft measurables
Height	Weight	Arm length	Hand span	Wingspan	40-yard dash	10-yard split	20-yard split	20-yard shuttle	Three-cone drill	Vertical jump	Broad jump
6 ft 0 1/4 in (1.84 m)	196 lb (89 kg)	31 3/4 in (0.81 m)	9 5/8 in (0.24 m)	6 ft 3 1/8 in (1.91 m)	4.56 s	1.60 s	2.60 s	4.10 s	6.99 s	34.0 in (0.86 m)	10 ft 9 in (3.28 m)
All values from Pro Day

=== Minnesota Vikings ===
The Minnesota Vikings selected Bynum in the fourth round (125th overall) of the 2021 NFL draft. General manager Rick Spielman announced the Vikings selection of Bynum and declared him as a safety. The Minnesota Vikings acquired the fourth round pick (125th overall) used to draft Bynum in a trade with the Chicago Bears for a fifth round (155th overall) pick during the 2020 NFL draft. He was the fifth safety drafted in 2021. He was drafted by the Vikings to possibly be the starting free safety after the role was available following the departure of Anthony Harris.

External videos
- Vikings' select Bynum with No. 125 pick
- Camryn Bynum on moving to safety

==== 2021 ====
On May 14, 2021, the Minnesota Vikings signed Bynum to a four–year, $4.19 million contract that includes an initial signing bonus of $717,812.

Throughout training camp, Bynum continued to show promise while going through his transition to safety and competed to be the starting free safety against Xavier Woods and Josh Metellus. Head coach Mike Zimmer named Bynum as the primary backup safety to start the season, behind starting free safety Xavier Woods and strong safety Harrison Smith.

On September 12, 2021, Bynum made his professional regular season debut in a 24–27 overtime loss at the Cincinnati Bengals and had two solo tackles. On December 8, 2021, Bynum earned his first career start at strong safety in place of Harrison Smith who was inactive in Week 9 due to COVID-19. He made a season-high 12 combined tackles (eight solo), one pass deflection, and made his first career interception on a pass thrown by Lamar Jackson to tight end Mark Andrews and returned it for 27-yards during a 31–34 overtime loss at the Baltimore Ravens. The following week, he recorded six combined tackles (five solo), deflected a pass, and made his first career sack on Justin Herbert for a seven-yard loss in the Vikings' 27–20 victory at the Los Angeles Chargers in Week 10. Bynum was inactive for two games (Weeks 12–13) after suffering an ankle injury. He was inactive in Week 18 due to COVID-19 as the Vikings defeated the Chicago Bears 31–19. He finished his rookie season in 2021 with a total of 28 combined tackles (20 solo), three pass deflections, one sack, and one interception in 14 games and three starts.

==== 2022 ====
On January 10, 2022, the Minnesota Vikings announced their decision to fire General Manager Rick Spielman and head coach Mike Zimmer after they finished the 2021 NFL season with an 8–9 record and did not qualify for the playoffs. On February 15, 2022, the Minnesota Vikings officially hired former Los Angeles Rams' offensive coordinator Kevin O'Connell as the new head coach. During training camp, he competed against Josh Metellus and rookie first–round pick Lewis Cine to be the starting free safety after it was available following the departure of Xavier Woods in free agency. Head coach Kevin O'Connell named Bynum as the starting free safety to begin the season, alongside strong safety Harrison Smith.

In Week 7, Bynum made two solo tackles, a pass deflection, and intercepted a pass by Kyler Murray to tight end Zach Ertz during the fourth quarter of a 34–26 win against the Arizona Cardinals. On December 4, 2022, Bynum made seven combined tackles (six solo), a season-high two pass deflections, and intercepted a pass thrown by Mike White to wide receiver Corey Davis, sealing a 27–22 victory in the last few seconds at the New York Jets. In Week 17, he racked up a season-high nine combined tackles (four solo) during a 17–41 loss at the Green Bay Packers. He started all 17 games in 2022 and finished with a total of 81 combined tackles (49 solo), six pass deflections, and two interceptions. His overall grade from Pro Football Focus was 58.2 in 2022.

The Minnesota Vikings finished the 2022 NFL season a top the NFC North with a 13–4 record to clinch a playoff berth in their first season under head coach Kevin O'Connell. On January 15, 2023, Bynum started in his first career playoff game and recorded seven combined tackles (five solo) during a 24–31 loss to the New York Giants in the NFC Wildcard Game.

==== 2023 ====
On January 19, 2023, Minnesota Vikings' head coach Kevin O'Connell announced his decision to fire defensive coordinator Ed Donatell. Bynum entered training camp slated as the starting free safety, but had to compete against Lewis Cine to retain the role under new defensive coordinator Brian Flores. Head coach Kevin O'Connell named Bynum and Harrison Smith as the starting safeties to begin 2023.

On September 14, 2023, Bynum collected a career–high 15 combined tackles (six solo) as the Vikings lost 28–34 at the Philadelphia Eagles. On October 23, 2023, Bynum recorded nine combined tackles (seven solo), two pass deflections, and made a career–high two interceptions off passes thrown by Brock Purdy in a 22–17 win over the San Francisco 49ers. His performance earned him the National Football Conference Defensive Player of the Week. He started all 17 games and finished with a career-high 137 combined tackles (94 solo), nine pass deflections, three forced fumbles, two interceptions, and was credited with half a sack. He earned an overall grade of 73.2 from Pro Football Focus. His performance earned him a $735,500 bonus due to the NFL's performance-based pay distribution system, bringing his salary from $940,000 to $3.10 million for the 2023 NFL season.

==== 2024 ====
He entered training camp slated as the starting free safety, ahead of Josh Metellus, Jay Ward, Lewis Cine, Bobby McCain, and Theo Jackson. Head coach Kevin O'Connell retained Bynum and Harrison Smith as the starting safeties to begin the season.

On October 6, 2024, he made six combined tackles (four solo), tied his season–high of two pass deflections, and intercepted a pass thrown by Aaron Rodgers to wide receiver Allen Lazard during a 23–17 win against the New York Jets. In Week 13, Bynum collected a season–high ten combined tackles (seven solo) during a 23–22 win against the Arizona Cardinals. He finished the 2024 NFL season with 96 combined tackles (54 solo), ten pass deflections, three interceptions, and two fumble recoveries while starting all 17 games. He received an overall grade of 69.8 from Pro Football Focus.

During the season, Bynum and Metellus became known for their choreographed celebrations following defensive turnovers, which included references to movies such as The Parent Trap, White Chicks, and High School Musical. Bynum and Metellus combined for five interceptions on the season.

=== Indianapolis Colts ===
==== 2025 ====
On March 12, 2025, the Indianapolis Colts signed Bynum to a four–year, $60 million contract as an unrestricted free agent and includes $30 million guaranteed, $26 million guaranteed upon signing, and an initial signing bonus of $18 million.

== NFL career statistics ==
Legend
**Bold**	Career high

=== Regular season ===
Year	Team	Games		Tackles					Interceptions						Fumbles				
Year	Team	GP	GS	Cmb	Solo	Ast	Sck	TFL	Int	Yds	Avg	Lng	TD	PD	FF	Fum	FR	Yds	TD
2021	MIN	14	3	28	20	8	**1.0**	1	1	**27**	**27.0**	**27**	0	3	0	0	0	0	0
2022	MIN	17	17	81	49	32	0.0	0	2	17	8.5	12	0	6	0	0	**2**	**55**	0
2023	MIN	17	17	**137**	**94**	**43**	0.5	2	2	0	0.0	0	0	9	**3**	0	0	0	0
2024	MIN	17	17	96	54	42	0.0	2	3	3	1.0	3	0	**10**	0	0	**2**	0	0
2025	IND	17	17	81	50	31	**1.0**	**3**	**4**	22	5.5	14	0	8	1	0	1	0	0
Career		82	71	423	267	156	2.5	8	12	69	5.8	27	0	36	4	0	5	55	0

=== Postseason ===
Year	Team	Games		Tackles					Interceptions						Fumbles				
Year	Team	GP	GS	Cmb	Solo	Ast	Sck	TFL	Int	Yds	Avg	Lng	TD	PD	FF	Fum	FR	Yds	TD
2022	MIN	1	1	**7**	**5**	**2**	0.0	0	0	0	0.0	0	0	0	0	0	0	0	0
2024	MIN	1	0	3	1	**2**	0.0	0	0	0	0.0	0	0	0	0	0	0	0	0
Career		2	1	10	6	4	0.0	0	0	0	0.0	0	0	0	0	0	0	0	0

== Personal life ==
Bynum is of Filipino descent through his mother and African American descent through his father. His maternal great-grandmother traced her roots to Leyte. On March 2, 2023, Bynum got married in the Philippines. Their first child, a daughter, was born in May 2025.

Bynum is a Christian. He has also been promoting flag football in the Philippines since 2023.
