= K. J. Osborn =

American football player (born 1997)

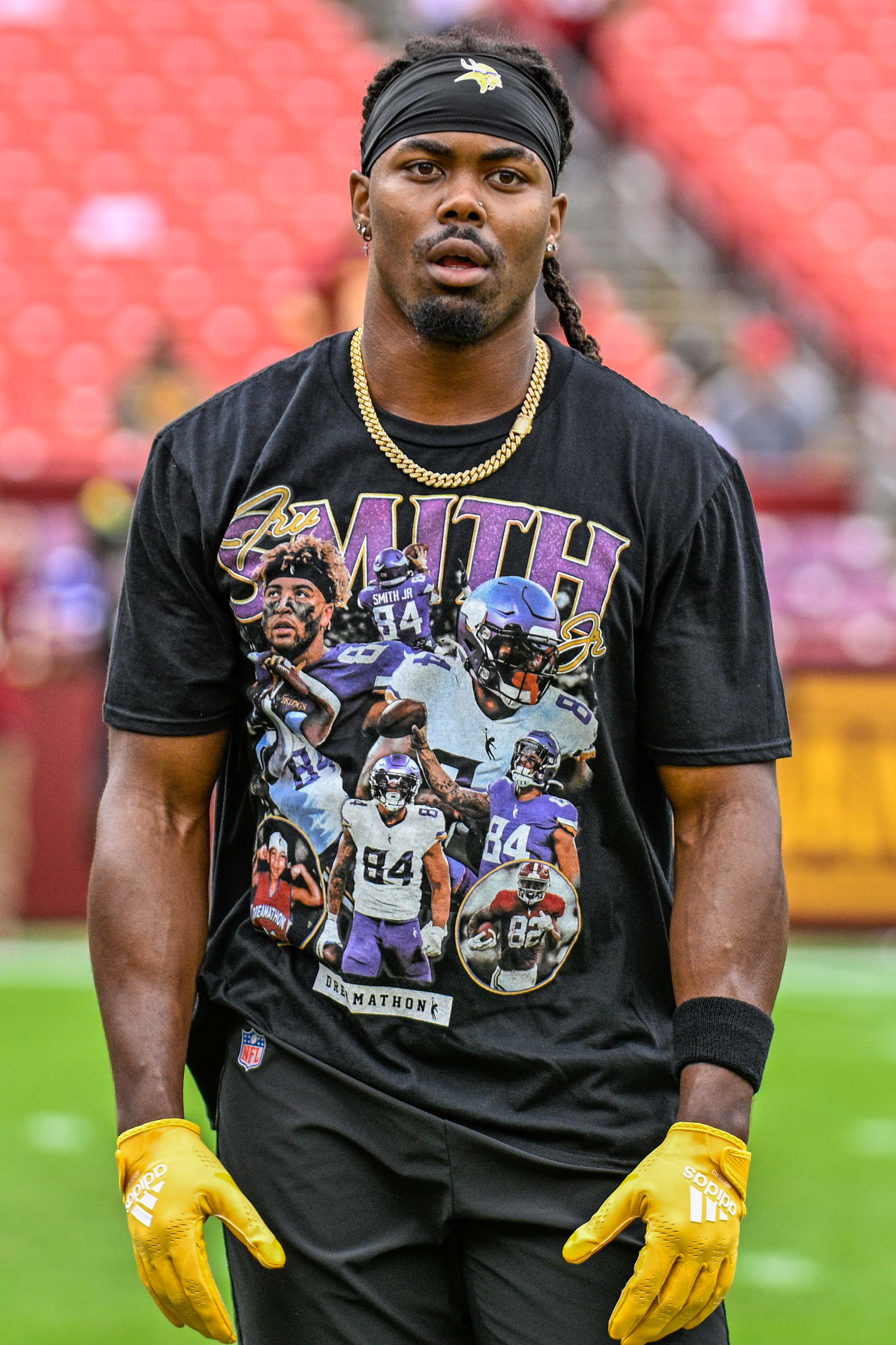
- Osborn with the Minnesota Vikings in 2022

No. 85 – Tennessee Titans
- Position: Wide receiver
- Roster status: Active

Personal information
- Born: June 10, 1997 (age 29); Ypsilanti, Michigan, U.S.
- Listed height: 5 ft 11 in (1.80 m)
- Listed weight: 203 lb (92 kg)

Career information
- High school: IMG Academy (Bradenton, Florida)
- College: Buffalo (2015–2018); Miami (FL) (2019)
- NFL draft: 2020: 5th round, 176th overall pick

Career history
- Minnesota Vikings (2020–2023); New England Patriots (2024); Washington Commanders (2024); Atlanta Falcons (2025)*; Tennessee Titans (2026–present)
- * Offseason or practice squad member only

Awards and highlights
- Second-team All-MAC (2018)

Career NFL statistics as of 2026
- Receptions: 165
- Receiving yards: 1,902
- Receiving touchdowns: 16
- Stats at Pro Football Reference

Kendrick Ladell "K. J." Osborn Jr. (born June 10, 1997) is an American professional football wide receiver for the Tennessee Titans of the National Football League (NFL). He played college football for the Buffalo Bulls and Miami Hurricanes prior to being selected by the Minnesota Vikings in the fifth round of the 2020 NFL draft.

== Early life and college ==
Osborn is a native of Ypsilanti, Michigan and attended Lincoln High School before transferring to IMG Academy for his senior year. Osborn played at SUNY Buffalo for three years. He had 96 catches for 1,490 yards and 12 touchdowns. Osborn earned second-team All-MAC honors in his last year at Buffalo. He enrolled at the University of Miami as a graduate transfer in 2019. He led the Hurricanes with 50 receptions for 547 yards and five touchdowns, in addition to returning 16 punts for 255 yards (15.9 average) and 10 kickoffs for 201 yards (20.1 average).

== Professional career ==
Pre-draft measurables
Height	Weight	Arm length	Hand span	Wingspan	40-yard dash	10-yard split	20-yard split	20-yard shuttle	Three-cone drill	Vertical jump	Broad jump	Bench press
5 ft 11 1/2 in (1.82 m)	203 lb (92 kg)	31 1/4 in (0.79 m)	9 1/8 in (0.23 m)	6 ft 3 in (1.91 m)	4.48 s	1.47 s	2.61 s	4.35 s	7.00 s	37.5 in (0.95 m)	10 ft 3 in (3.12 m)	18 reps
All values from NFL Combine

=== Minnesota Vikings ===
Osborn was selected by the Minnesota Vikings in the fifth round (176th pick) of the 2020 NFL draft.

In Week 6 of the 2021 season, Osborn caught the game-winning touchdown pass in overtime against the Carolina Panthers. In Week 14, Osborn had 3 receptions for 83 yards, including a 63-yard touchdown pass from quarterback Kirk Cousins, in a 36–28 win over the Pittsburgh Steelers.

Osborn finished the 2021 season with 655 receiving yards and seven touchdowns; both statistics ranked as third-most on the Vikings behind fellow wide receivers Justin Jefferson and Adam Thielen.

During Week 15 of the 2022 season against the Indianapolis Colts, Osborn finished with 157 receiving yards and a touchdown on 10 receptions. Trailing by 33 points, the Vikings came back and won 39–36 in overtime, the largest comeback in NFL history. In Week 18, Osborn had his second-career 100+-yard game in the season finale against the Chicago Bears, finishing with 117 receiving yards on 5 receptions.

He finished the 2023 season with 48 receptions for 540 yards and three touchdowns.

=== New England Patriots ===
On March 19, 2024, Osborn signed with the New England Patriots. He was waived on December 10, finishing his tenure with seven catches for 57 yards and a touchdown.

=== Washington Commanders ===
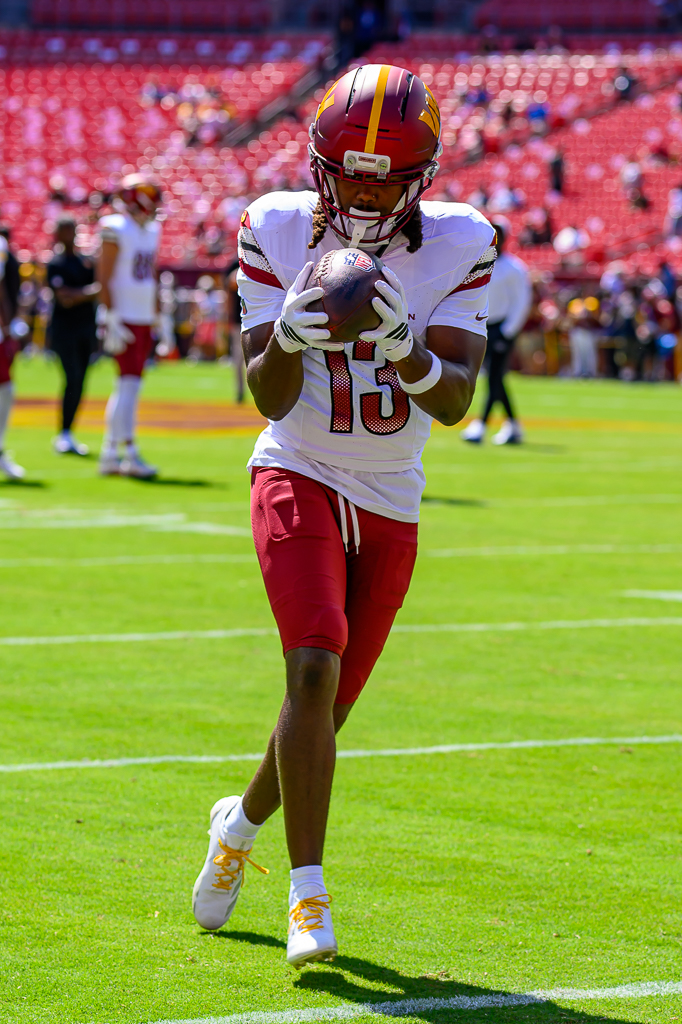
Osborn with the Washington Commanders in 2025.

On December 11, 2024, Osborn was claimed off waivers by the Washington Commanders.

On March 14, 2025, he re-signed with the Commanders on a one-year contract. On August 26, Osborn was released due to roster cuts.

=== Atlanta Falcons ===
On November 24, 2025, Osborn signed with the Atlanta Falcons' practice squad.

=== Tennessee Titans ===
On April 1, 2026, Osborn signed with the Tennessee Titans. He was waived by the Titans as a part of final roster cuts on August 30, but re–signed with the team's practice squad the next day. He was activated on October 24.

== NFL career statistics ==
Legend
**Bold**	Career high

Regular season

Year	Team	Games		Receiving							Fumbles	
Year	Team	GP	GS	Tgt	Rec	Yds	Avg	Lng	TD	1D	Fum	Lost
2020	MIN	9	0	-	-	-	-	-	-	-	**2**	**1**
2021	MIN	17	9	82	50	**655**	**13.1**	64	**7**	26	0	0
2022	MIN	17	9	**90**	**60**	650	10.8	**66**	5	**32**	1	**1**
2023	MIN	16	12	75	48	540	11.3	47	3	28	1	**1**
2024	NE	7	4	18	7	57	8.1	22	1	2	0	0
Career		67	34	265	165	1,902	11.5	66	16	88	4	3

== Personal life ==
Osborn is a Christian. On March 6, 2023, Osborn and three others rescued Nelson Thomas, a former contestant on MTV's The Challenge, from a burning car in Austin, Texas. Thomas' leg was amputated as a result of the accident.
