= Karl Scott =

American football coach (born 1985)

Seattle Seahawks
- Title: Defensive backs coach/Defensive passing game coordinator

Personal information
- Born: May 2, 1985 (age 41); Houston, Texas, U.S.

Career information
- College: McMurry

Career history
- Delta State (2007) Graduate assistant; Tusculum College (2008–2011) Defensive backs coach; Southeastern Louisiana (2012–2013) Linebackers coach; Southeastern Louisiana (2014) Defensive coordinator; Louisiana Tech (2015) Defensive backs coach; Texas Tech (2016–2017) Defensive backs coach; Alabama (2018–2020) Defensive backs coach; Minnesota Vikings (2021) Defensive backs coach; Seattle Seahawks (2022–present) Defensive backs coach/Defensive passing game coordinator

Awards and highlights
- Super Bowl champion (LX); CFP national champion (2020)

Karl Scott (born May 2, 1985) is an American professional football coach for the Seattle Seahawks. He previously coached at the collegiate level at Alabama and Texas Tech.

== Coaching career ==
=== Early coaching career ===
Scott's coaching career began at Delta State as a graduate assistant in 2007. He then went on to work four years at Tusculum College serving as the team's recruiting coordinator, defensive backs coach and linebackers coach. He then went on to coach at Southeastern Louisiana for three years, coaching the linebackers for the first two years and then serving as the defensive coordinator in 2014. In 2015 Scott coached the Louisiana Tech Bulldogs safeties under head coach Skip Holtz. For the next two years he oversaw the entire Red Raider secondary.

=== Alabama ===
Scott spent three years coaching at the University of Alabama under Nick Saban and defensive coordinator Pete Golding whom he had previously worked with at Southeastern and at Tusculum. Originally he was coaching both positions in the defensive backfield, but for the final two years of his tenure at Alabama he was only coaching corners. In 2020 he was a part of the Alabama undefeated national championship team.

=== Minnesota Vikings ===
For the 2021 season, the Minnesota Vikings replaced defensive backs coach Daronte Jones with Scott.

=== Seattle Seahawks ===
On February 8, 2022, Scott has been hired by the Seattle Seahawks as the main Secondary Coach and Passing Game Coordinator. He was retained by new head coach Mike Macdonald when former head coach Pete Carroll stepped down. On February 8, 2026 he was involved with the Seahawks’ win of Super Bowl LX.

== Personal life ==
Scott and his wife Taron have 2 daughters, Kina Bailey and Kari Mae.
