= Rick Spielman =

American football executive (born 1962)

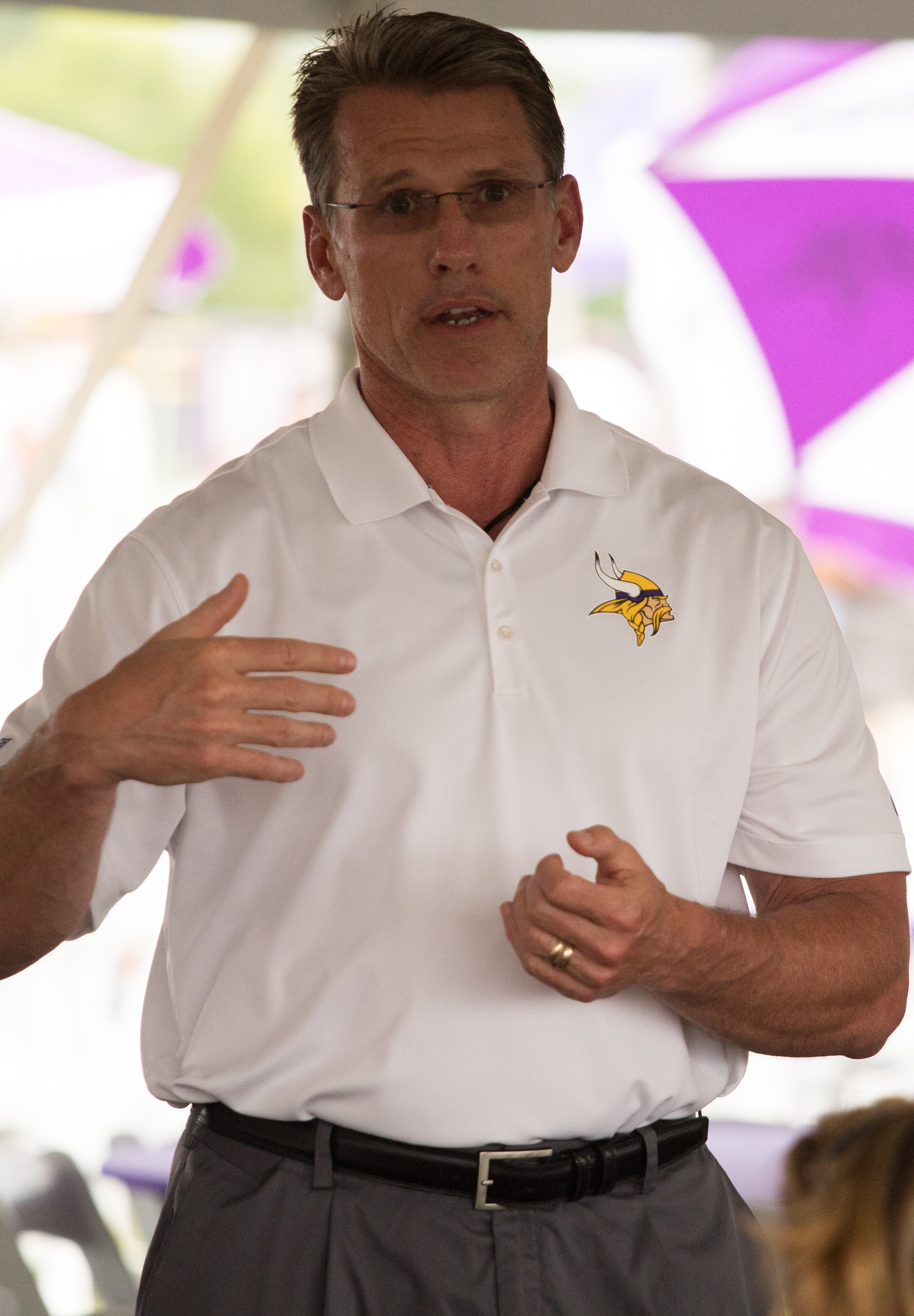
- Spielman in 2014

New York Jets
- Title: Senior football adviser

Personal information
- Born: December 2, 1962 (age 63); Canton, Ohio, U.S.
- Listed height: 6 ft 2 in (1.88 m)

Career information
- Position: Linebacker
- High school: Massillon Washington (Massillon, Ohio)
- College: Southern Illinois

Career history

Playing
- San Diego Chargers (1987)*; Detroit Lions (1988)*
- * Offseason or practice squad member only

Operations
- Detroit Lions (1990–1996) Scout; Chicago Bears (1997–1999) Director of pro personnel; Miami Dolphins (2000–2001) Vice president of player personnel; Miami Dolphins (2002–2003) Senior vice president of football operations; Miami Dolphins (2004) General manager; Minnesota Vikings (2006–2011) Vice president of player personnel; Minnesota Vikings (2012–2021) General manager; New York Jets (2025–present) Senior football adviser
- Executive profile at Pro Football Reference

Richard Spielman (born December 2, 1962) is an American football executive for the New York Jets. He was the general manager of the Miami Dolphins in 2004 and the Minnesota Vikings from 2012 to 2022. He formerly worked for ESPN on NFL Live. Spielman is the older brother of Chris Spielman, former Detroit Lions and Buffalo Bills linebacker.

== Playing career ==
Spielman played linebacker at Southern Illinois University (1983–86), earning first-team All-Gateway Conference honoree as a junior. He was also part of the 1983 NCAA Division I-AA national championship team as a redshirt freshman. Upon entering the NFL, as an undrafted free agent, he was invited to training camp with the San Diego Chargers (1987) and Detroit Lions (1988), but did not make it as a professional football player.

== Executive career ==
=== Early career ===
Spielman began his NFL career as a scout with Detroit in 1990 and worked with the club in college scouting for five seasons before adding pro scouting duties in 1995 and 1996. He moved to director of pro personnel for the Bears from 1997 to 1999 before joining the Dolphins in 2000 as vice president of player personnel. He was promoted in 2002 to senior vice president of football operations and player personnel and eventually general manager in 2004. Spielman left the Dolphins during the 2005 offseason, later working at ESPN as an analyst.

=== Miami Dolphins ===
On May 3, 2000, Spielman was hired to be vice president of player personnel for the Dolphins. He had previously served the position of Bears' director of pro personnel with the Bears from 1997 to 1999, with two of those seasons having been coached by Dave Wannstedt, who was now the head coach of the Dolphins. In 2002, he was promoted to senior vice president of football operations. Spielman was promoted to general manager after the 2003 season saw the team miss the playoffs for the 2nd straight year (Ron Wolf turned down the position when asked by team owner Wayne Huizenga). Wannstedt was fired midway through the 2004 season, which saw the team win just one of their first eight games with a roster missing running back Ricky Williams, who abruptly retired in August. In that same month, the Dolphins elected to trade Adewale Ogunleye (the 2003 leader in sacks for the AFC) due to him holding out and not accepting the qualifying offer as a restricted free agent; they received Marty Booker and a third-round pick in the 2005 draft. An attempt at trading for a quarterback to win the starting job with A.J. Feeley (the third-string player on the Philadelphia Eagles) saw them trade a second-round pick for him only to see him start (and lose) two of the first three games of the season on the way to throwing 11 touchdowns against 15 interceptions.

Spielman's power over personnel decisions was stripped when Huizenga gave Nick Saban complete control of football operations after hiring him to be the head coach on December 25, 2004. This decision, along with the disastrous 2004 season and a falling out with Saban, led Spielman to resign from his post as GM in June 2005.

=== Minnesota Vikings ===
Spielman assumed the Vikings' vice president of player personnel role on May 30, 2006, replacing Fran Foley. On January 3, 2012, Spielman was promoted to general manager of the Vikings.

Despite his lack of success with the Dolphins, Spielman established himself as one of the league's better general managers during his 16-year tenure with the organization. From 2010 to 2019, 12.5% of Viking draft selections made the Pro Bowl. which was fourth best in the league, and he was also NFL.com's 6th ranked GM in 2021. His most notable draftees include: Adrian Peterson and Sidney Rice in 2007; John Sullivan in 2008; Percy Harvin and Phil Loadholt in 2009; Christian Ponder and Kyle Rudolph in 2011; Matt Kalil, Harrison Smith and Blair Walsh in 2012; Xavier Rhodes, and Cordarrelle Patterson in 2013; and, Teddy Bridgewater and Anthony Barr in 2014; Trae Waynes, Eric Kendricks, Danielle Hunter, and Stefon Diggs in 2015; Dalvin Cook in 2017, Brian O'Neill and Daniel Carlson in 2018; Justin Jefferson in 2020; and Christian Darrisaw in 2021. Prior to 2012 when he was promoted to general manager, Spielman shared a "triangle of authority" in drafts where he ran the personnel department with final say over the draft while working in tandem with the head coach (Brad Childress until 2010 before he was replaced by Leslie Frazier) for on-field operations while salary cap and contracts were negotiated by football operations vice president Rob Brzezinski that all (as a "Triangle of Authority" in some circles) reported directly to team owner Zygi Wilf.

In 2014, Spielman was given the authority to make a head coaching change. He hired Mike Zimmer to replace Leslie Frazier. Mike Zimmer and new offensive coordinator Norv Turner were involved in the draft process in 2014 and 2015. Notable 2015 draft picks on defense included Eric Kendricks who led the Vikings in tackles, Danielle Hunter who recorded 6 sacks in limited playing time and saw his role grow towards the end of the year. The Vikings also drafted star wide receiver Stefon Diggs (4× Pro Bowl, first-team All-Pro (2020), second-team All-Pro (2022)).

In 2012, Spielman helped the team sign fullback Jerome Felton who made it to the Pro Bowl that same year and who was a major contributor to Adrian Peterson rushing for the second-highest amount of rushing yards in a season in NFL history. In 2013, Spielman traded WR Percy Harvin for the Seattle Seahawk's 2013 1st, 7th and 2014 3rd round draft picks. The trade proved to be largely beneficial for the Vikings, as they used that pick on All-Pro Cornerback Xavier Rhodes. In 2015, the Vikings brought in Terence Newman and traded for Mike Wallace. The emergence of Stefon Diggs and a poor schematic fit caused the Vikings to cut Wallace, who was subsequently scooped up by the Ravens. However, Both Newman and Rhodes contributed to a record-breaking 2017 Minnesota Vikings defense that led the franchise to its first Conference Championship appearance since 2009. The 2020 offseason saw the Vikings trade Stefon Diggs and a seventh round pick to the Buffalo Bills in exchange for a first, fourth, fifth, and sixth round pick. With the Bill's 22nd pick of the 2020 draft, the Vikings selected wide receiver Justin Jefferson. During his last draft overseen in 2021, the Vikings elected to trade down nine spots to draft Darrisaw at offensive tackle.

Although Spielman drafted well and made some great trades, he struggled to consistently land talent through free agency. In the 2012 offseason, before Kyle Rudolph was drafted, Spielman signed Seattle Seahawks tight end John Carlson to a 5-year, $25 million contract. Carlson played only two years for the franchise before being cut, never amassing more than 400 yards receiving. During the 2013 offseason, Spielman signed veteran Green Bay wide receiver Greg Jennings to a 5-year, $47.5 million ($18 million guaranteed) contract. Jennings failed to surpass 900 yards receiving during his brief tenure and was cut after two seasons. During the 2016 Offseason, Tackle Mike Remmers was signed to a 5-year, $30 million deal and Guard Alex Boone was signed to a 4-year, $26.8 million deal. Despite both being signed for multiple years, both players were cut within two years. There were some notable exceptions such as the signing of Pro Bowl nose tackle Linval Joseph, who was a key contributor to the Vikings 2017 playoff run. In addition, Spielman successfully found key starters in undrafted free agents such as Andrew Sendejo, Adam Thielen and Anthony Harris. In hopes of finally winning it all, the Vikings signed free agent QB Kirk Cousins to a fully guaranteed 3-year $84 million contract in 2018. This signing by Spielman caused tension between him and head coach Zimmer, who was reluctant to allocate such a significant portion of the salary cap to a single player.

In August 2020, Spielman signed a multiyear extension with the Vikings. Despite the heavy investment at quarterback, the Vikings failed to make the playoffs in three of the first four years with Cousins at the starting position under Zimmer. Tensions rose between Speilman and Zimmer, with things coming to a head during the 2021 NFL Draft. In an interview with the Star Tribune, Zimmer stated that "...When he picked [Kellen] Mond, I walked out of the room... I left the building. I didn’t even talk to him on the phone.". Zimmer also expressed displeasure with Speilman's attempt to trade up for Justin Fields, and his lack of involvement with the day 2 selections. Zimmer and Spielman were fired on January 10, 2022. In January 2024, Spielman worked with the Washington Commanders as an advisor in a search that led to the hiring of general manager Adam Peters and head coach Dan Quinn.

=== New York Jets ===
On February 6, 2025, the New York Jets hired Spielman as a senior football adviser.

== Personal life ==
Spielman is married and has six adopted children. Ronnie Spielman played lacrosse at Ohio State University. JD Spielman played football as a wide receiver at Nebraska and TCU.
