= Rashod Hill =

American football player (born 1992)

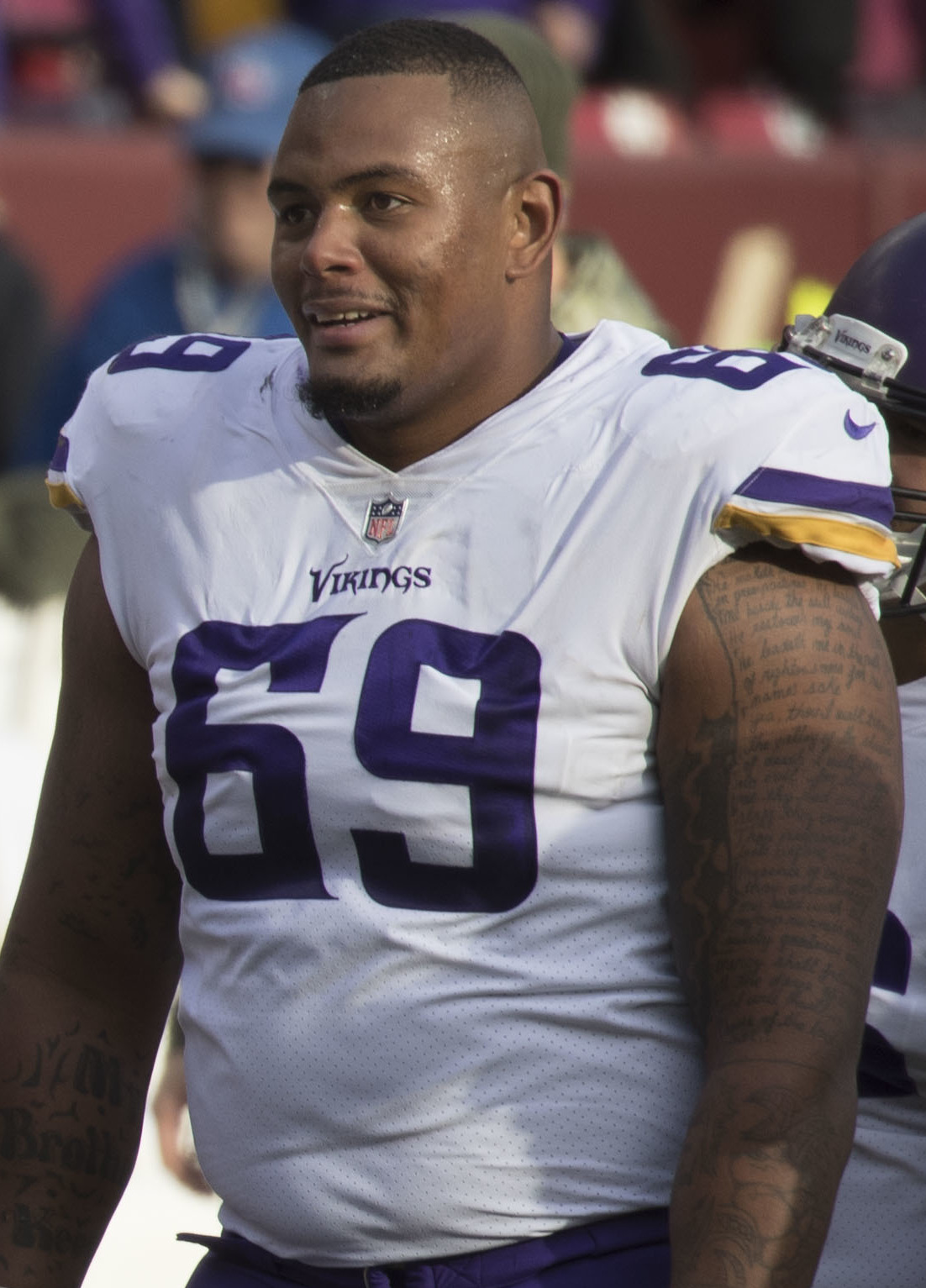
- Hill with the Minnesota Vikings in 2017

No. 69
- Position: Offensive tackle

Personal information
- Born: January 12, 1992 (age 34); Jacksonville, Florida, U.S.
- Listed height: 6 ft 6 in (1.98 m)
- Listed weight: 310 lb (141 kg)

Career information
- High school: Edward H. White (Jacksonville)
- College: Southern Miss (2011–2015)
- NFL draft: 2016: undrafted

Career history
- Jacksonville Jaguars (2016); Minnesota Vikings (2016–2021); Washington Commanders (2022)*
- * Offseason or practice squad member only

Awards and highlights
- Second-team All-Conference USA (2015)

Career NFL statistics
- Games played: 75
- Games started: 22
- Stats at Pro Football Reference

Rashod Demontary Hill (born January 12, 1992) is an American former professional football player who was an offensive tackle in the National Football League (NFL). He played college football for the Southern Miss Golden Eagles. He has been a member of the Jacksonville Jaguars, Minnesota Vikings, and Washington Commanders.

== Early life ==
Born to Renee Hill Boyd and raised by David Boyd Sr. (his stepfather), Hill attended Edward H. White High School in Jacksonville, Florida. A two-star offensive lineman by both Rivals.com and Scout.com, Hill was a member of the 2010 District 4-4A champion squad for Ed White High School. The Commanders finished the season with an 8–3 mark as he helped open holes for an outstanding running squad. On January 27, 2011, Hill committed to the University of Southern Mississippi to play college football.

== College career ==
Hill attended the University of Southern Mississippi from 2011 to 2015. He redshirted as a true freshman in 2011, and made his collegiate debut against Western Kentucky the following season. He appeared in eight games as a redshirt freshman, playing all along the line, primarily in field goal and special teams situations. As a sophomore in 2013, Hill played and started 11 of the 12 games during the season, helping the Golden Eagles' offense to 3,786 yards of total offense, including 2,911 yards passing and 875 yards rushing. In 2014, Hill played and started all 12 games for the first time in his career at left tackle. The team rushed for 1,149 yards, while passing for an additional 3,231 for a total offensive production of 4,380 yards. Hill returned as a starter in 2015 and helped Southern Miss average 509.5 yards per game (12th best in the nation) and garnered second-team All-Conference USA recognition.

== Professional career ==
Pre-draft measurables
Height	Weight	40-yard dash	10-yard split	20-yard split	20-yard shuttle	Three-cone drill	Vertical jump	Broad jump	Bench press
6 ft 6 3/8 in (1.99 m)	309 lb (140 kg)	5.30 s	1.87 s	2.99 s	4.75 s	8.00 s	26 in (0.66 m)	8 ft 9 in (2.67 m)	21 reps
All values from Southern Miss pro day

=== Jacksonville Jaguars ===
Hill signed with the Jacksonville Jaguars as an undrafted free agent on May 1, 2016. In the preseason opener at the New York Jets on August 11, 2016, Hill played 15 snaps at right tackle. The following game against the Tampa Bay Buccaneers, he was on the field for 16 snaps. The win over the Bengals in Week 3 was Hill's longest outing by far, as he played 44 snaps. After the Jaguars placed veteran Jeff Linkenbach on injured reserve on August 22, Hill was named the primary backup to starter Jermey Parnell. In the final preseason game, Hill started at right tackle on Thursday night against the Atlanta Falcons at the Georgia Dome. Hill was activated for the game against the Baltimore Ravens in Week 3, but did not play.

=== Minnesota Vikings ===
On November 15, 2016, Hill was signed off the Jaguars' practice squad by the Minnesota Vikings. Hill made his first NFL appearance in Week 17 after starting left tackle T. J. Clemmings went out with an injury early in the game against the Chicago Bears; for the game, he was the highest-graded offensive lineman for Minnesota according to Pro Football Focus (PFF) with a 78.5 score on their rating system, as he didn't allow a sack, hit or hurry of Sam Bradford in his 36 pass-blocking snaps. It was Hill's first game action since his college days.

Hill entered the 2017 season as the Vikings backup tackle. He earned his first start of the season at right tackle in place of the injured Mike Remmers. He entered the 2018 season as the Vikings starting right tackle. He was moved over to left tackle from Weeks 6–8 in place of an injured Riley Reiff. During that time, rookie Brian O'Neill started at right tackle in his place. After Reiff returned from injury, Hill was demoted to a backup role the rest of the season as O'Neill had played well in his place. On March 11, 2019, the Vikings placed a low-level restricted free agent tender on Hill. On April 15, 2019, the Vikings re-signed Hill. On March 25, 2020, Hill re-signed with the Vikings. On March 17, 2021, Hill re-signed with the Vikings.

=== Washington Commanders ===
Hill signed with the Washington Commanders on July 30, 2022, and was released on August 23, 2022.
