= Brian O'Neill (American football) =

American football player (born 1995)

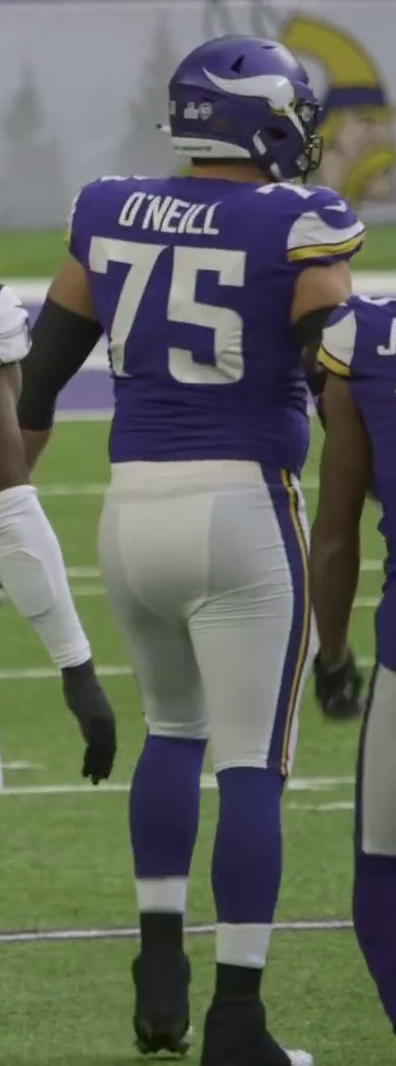
- O'Neill with the Minnesota Vikings in 2020

No. 75 – Minnesota Vikings
- Position: Offensive tackle
- Roster status: Active

Personal information
- Born: September 15, 1995 (age 31); Wilmington, Delaware, U.S.
- Listed height: 6 ft 7 in (2.01 m)
- Listed weight: 310 lb (141 kg)

Career information
- High school: Salesianum (Wilmington)
- College: Pittsburgh (2014–2017)
- NFL draft: 2018: 2nd round, 62nd overall pick

Career history
- Minnesota Vikings (2018–present)

Awards and highlights
- 2× Pro Bowl (2021, 2024); First team All-ACC (2017); Third-team All-ACC (2016)

Career NFL statistics as of Week 10, 2026
- Games played: 133
- Games started: 129
- Stats at Pro Football Reference

Brian Cormac O'Neill (born September 15, 1995) is an American professional football offensive tackle for the Minnesota Vikings of the National Football League (NFL). He played college football for the Pittsburgh Panthers.

== Early life ==
O'Neill attended Salesianum School in Wilmington, Delaware. Along with football, he also played basketball and lacrosse. Offensively as a senior he caught 33 passes for 614 yards and eight touchdowns. Defensively, he tallied 45 tackles, five sacks, 13 pass deflections, three forced fumbles and two fumble recoveries. A 3-star recruit, he committed to play football for Pittsburgh as a tight end in July 2013 over offers from Coastal Carolina, Old Dominion, and Tulane, among other offers.

== College career ==
O'Neill redshirted as a true freshman in 2014.

O'Neill made the switch from tight end to offensive tackle in July 2015. Minus the first game of the 2015 season, O'Neill started every game for Pittsburgh from 2015 to 2017 (37 consecutive starts). In 2016 he was named to the All-Atlantic Coast Conference (ACC) Third-team and in 2017 the All-ACC First-team. After 2017, his redshirt junior season, he declared for the 2018 NFL draft.

== Professional career ==
O'Neill had an impressive performance at the 2018 NFL Combine. He ran the 40-yard dash in 4.82 seconds, the fastest time among all offensive linemen and the best time for a lineman since 2013. It also was the fourth-fastest recorded time for an offensive lineman at the combine since 2006, trailing only Eagles' Lane Johnson (4.72), Saints' Terron Armstead (4.71) and Vikings teammate Aviante Collins (4.77). He also had the best time among offensive linemen in the three-cone drill, at 7.14 seconds.

External videos
- O'Neill's NFL Combine workout
- O'Neill gets drafted by Minnesota

Pre-draft measurables
Height	Weight	Arm length	Hand span	Wingspan	40-yard dash	10-yard split	20-yard split	20-yard shuttle	Three-cone drill	Vertical jump	Broad jump	Bench press
6 ft 6 7/8 in (2.00 m)	297 lb (135 kg)	34 1/8 in (0.87 m)	9 3/8 in (0.24 m)	6 ft 6 1/2 in (1.99 m)	4.82 s	1.70 s	2.83 s	4.50 s	7.14 s	29.5 in (0.75 m)	8 ft 11 in (2.72 m)	22 reps
All values from NFL Combine

O'Neill was selected by the Minnesota Vikings in the second round (62nd overall) of the 2018 NFL draft. He entered the season as a backup tackle behind starters Riley Reiff and Rashod Hill. O'Neill made his first career start in Week 6 at right tackle after Hill was moved to left tackle in place of an injured Reiff. He maintained that starting role the rest of the season over Hill after Reiff returned from injury to play left tackle.

On September 8, 2021, O'Neill signed a five-year, $92.5 million contract extension with the Vikings. Following the 2021 season, O'Neill was named to the 2022 Pro Bowl, his first.

On January 3, 2023, O'Neill was placed on injured reserve. Shortly thereafter, he underwent surgery to repair a partially torn Achilles tendon.

On July 28, 2026, O'Neill and the Vikings agreed to a four–year, $96 million contract extension.

== Personal life ==
O'Neill's father, Brendan, played football at Dartmouth and his mother, Elizabeth, swam at Northeastern. His older brother, Eamon O’Neill, was a two time Delaware player of the year for the Salesianum School soccer team. He went on to star at Northwestern. His uncle is former Delaware Governor and Wilmington Mayor John Carney, who also played football at Dartmouth. Brian married his high school sweetheart, Bryn Gorelick, in March 2024.
