= 2020 Minnesota Vikings season =

60th season in franchise history

- Owner: Zygi Wilf
- General manager: Rick Spielman
- Head coach: Mike Zimmer
- Home stadium: U.S. Bank Stadium

Results
- Record: 7–9
- Division place: 3rd NFC North
- Playoffs: Did not qualify
- All-Pros: WR Justin Jefferson (2nd team)
- Pro Bowlers: RB Dalvin Cook; WR Justin Jefferson

Uniform
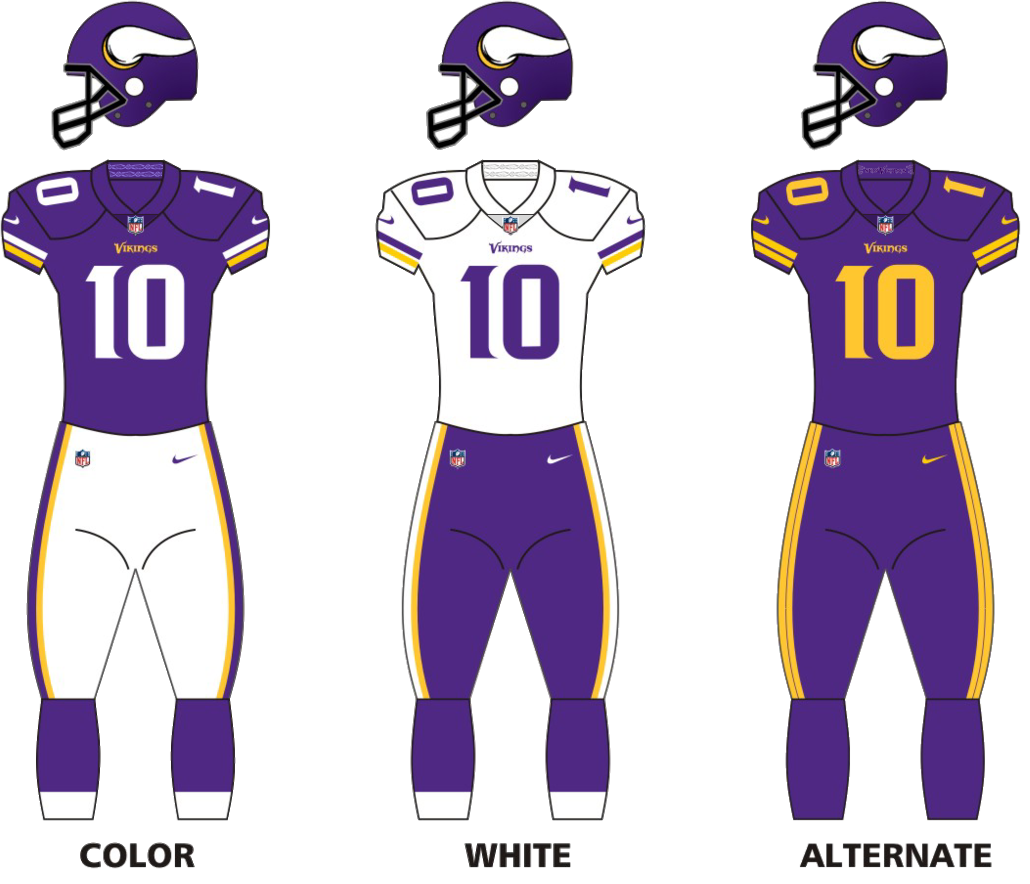

The 2020 season was the Minnesota Vikings' 60th in the National Football League (NFL), their fifth playing home games at U.S. Bank Stadium and their seventh under head coach Mike Zimmer. This was the Vikings' first time since 2005 that long-time assistant Kevin Stefanski was not part of the Vikings coaching staff, as he left to become the new head coach of the Cleveland Browns on January 12, 2020. After going 1–5 in their first six games for the first time since 2013, the team failed to improve upon their 10–6 record from 2019 after a Week 11 loss to the Dallas Cowboys and failed to match their 10–6 record after a Week 14 loss to the Tampa Bay Buccaneers.

The Vikings were eliminated from playoff contention following a week 16 loss to the New Orleans Saints, and ultimately finished 7–9, their first losing season since 2014. The Vikings conceded 475 points during the season, the third-highest total in franchise history, although they also managed to score 430 points, also the third-most in team history.

== Offseason ==
=== Transactions ===
Players lost in 2020
Name	Position	Type	2020 team	Contract	Ref.
Mackensie Alexander	CB	UFA	Cincinnati Bengals	1 year, $4 million	
Kentrell Brothers	LB	UFA			
Stefon Diggs	WR	Trade	Buffalo Bills		
Everson Griffen	DE	UFA	Dallas Cowboys	1 year, $6 million	
Linval Joseph	DT	Released	Los Angeles Chargers	2 years, $17 million	
Jayron Kearse	S	UFA	Detroit Lions	1 year, $2 million	
Josh Kline	G	Released			
David Morgan II	TE	Released			
Xavier Rhodes	CB	Released	Indianapolis Colts	1 year, $3.25 million	
Andrew Sendejo	S	UFA	Cleveland Browns	1 year, $2.25 million	
Marcus Sherels	CB	UFA			
Laquon Treadwell	WR	UFA	Atlanta Falcons	1 year, $910,000	
Trae Waynes	CB	UFA	Cincinnati Bengals	3 years, $42 million	
Stephen Weatherly	DE	UFA	Carolina Panthers	2 years, $12.5 million	

Players signed in 2020
Name	Position	Type	2019 team	Contract	Ref.
Ameer Abdullah	RB	UFA	Minnesota Vikings	1 year, $1.0475 million	
Dan Bailey	K	UFA	Minnesota Vikings	3 years, $10 million	
Britton Colquitt	P	UFA	Minnesota Vikings	3 years, $9 million	
Kirk Cousins	QB	Extension	Minnesota Vikings	2 years, $66 million	
Dakota Dozier	T	UFA	Minnesota Vikings	1 year, $1 million	
DeMarquis Gates	LB	UFA	Houston Roughnecks (XFL)	1 year, $610,000	
C. J. Ham	FB	Extension	Minnesota Vikings	4 years, $12 million	
Anthony Harris	S	UFA (franchise tag)	Minnesota Vikings	1 year, $11.441 million	
Rashod Hill	G	UFA	Minnesota Vikings	1 year, $1.0475 million	
Brett Jones	C	UFA	Minnesota Vikings	1 year, $1 million	
Sean Mannion	QB	UFA	Minnesota Vikings	1 year, $1.047 million	
Michael Pierce	DT	UFA	Baltimore Ravens	3 years, $27 million	
Tajae Sharpe	WR	UFA	Tennessee Titans	1 year, $1 million	
Eric Wilson	LB	RFA (second-round tender)	Minnesota Vikings	1 year, $3.259 million	
Anthony Zettel	DE	UFA	San Francisco 49ers	1 year, $1 million	

=== 2020 draft ===
The Vikings had a total of 15 selections in the 2020 NFL draft, a record number since the draft moved to a seven-round format in 1994. Although they had lost their original fifth-round pick to the Baltimore Ravens in the trade for kicker/punter Kaare Vedvik prior to the 2019 season and their seventh-round pick in the trade that sent wide receiver Stefon Diggs to the Buffalo Bills earlier in the 2020 offseason, the Diggs trade gave the Vikings extra picks in the first, fifth and sixth rounds. They also had an extra pick in the seventh round after trading guard Danny Isidora to the Miami Dolphins at the start of the 2019 season, as well as one compensatory pick in the third round and two in the seventh as a result of free agency losses in 2019.

After taking LSU wide receiver Justin Jefferson 22nd overall with the first-round pick they acquired from the Bills, the Vikings traded their original first-round pick (25th overall) to the San Francisco 49ers in exchange for the 31st overall pick, as well as selections in the fourth and fifth rounds; with the 31st overall pick, the Vikings took TCU cornerback Jeff Gladney. The Vikings used their second-round pick on Boise State offensive tackle Ezra Cleveland, then took Mississippi State cornerback Cameron Dantzler in the third round, before trading their third-round compensatory pick to the New Orleans Saints for the Saints' remaining picks in the fourth, fifth, sixth and seventh rounds.

In the fourth round, the Vikings used the picks they acquired from the 49ers and Saints to select South Carolina defensive end D. J. Wonnum and Baylor defensive tackle James Lynch, before taking Oregon linebacker Troy Dye with their original fourth-round pick. The Vikings traded the fifth-round pick they acquired from the Bills to the Chicago Bears for a fourth-round pick in the 2021 draft, before using their remaining fifth-round selections on Temple Owls cornerback Harrison Hand and Miami (FL) wide receiver K. J. Osborn. In the sixth round, the Vikings traded the other pick they acquired from the Bills—along with the seventh-round selection they got from the Dolphins—to the Ravens for another seventh-round pick and a fifth-round pick in 2021 before taking Oregon State offensive tackle Blake Brandel and Michigan safety Josh Metellus. The Vikings then had four remaining picks in the seventh round, which they used on Michigan State Spartans defensive end Kenny Willekes, Iowa quarterback Nate Stanley, Mississippi State safety Brian Cole II and Washburn guard Kyle Hinton.

Pro Bowler

2020 Minnesota Vikings draft selections
Round	Selection	Player name	Position	College	Notes
1	22	Justin Jefferson	WR	LSU	From Bills (Note: The Vikings traded a seventh-round selection (239th overall) and WR Stefon Diggs to the Buffalo Bills in exchange for Buffalo's first-, fifth- and sixth-round selections (22nd, 155th and 201st overall), and a 2021 fourth-round selection.)
1	25	Traded to the San Francisco 49ers (Note: The Vikings traded a first-round selection (25th overall) to the San Francisco 49ers in exchange for first-, fourth- and fifth-round selections (31st, 117th and 176th overall).)			
1	31	Jeff Gladney	CB	TCU	From 49ers
2	58	Ezra Cleveland	OT	Boise State	
3	89	Cameron Dantzler	CB	Mississippi State	
3	105	Traded to the New Orleans Saints (Note: The Vikings traded a third-round selection (105th overall) to the New Orleans Saints in exchange for fourth-, fifth-, sixth- and seventh-round selection (130th, 169th, 203rd and 244th overall).)			Compensatory pick
4	117	D. J. Wonnum	DE	South Carolina	From 49ers
4	130	James Lynch	DT	Baylor	From Saints
4	132	Troy Dye	LB	Oregon	
5	155	Traded to the Chicago Bears (Note: The Vikings traded a fifth-round selection (155th overall) to the Chicago Bears in exchange for a 2021 fourth-round selection.)			From Bills
5	169	Harrison Hand	CB	Temple	From Saints
5	170	Traded to the Baltimore Ravens (Note: The Vikings traded a fifth-round selection (170th overall) to the Baltimore Ravens in exchange for K Kaare Vedvik.)			
5	176	K. J. Osborn	WR	Miami (FL)	From 49ers
6	201	Traded to the Baltimore Ravens (Note: The Vikings traded sixth- and seventh-round selections (201st and 219th overall) to the Baltimore Ravens in exchange for a seventh-round selection (225th overall) and a 2021 fifth-round selection.)			From Bills
6	203	Blake Brandel	OT	Oregon State	From Saints
6	205	Josh Metellus	S	Michigan	
7	219	Traded to the Baltimore Ravens			From Dolphins (Note: The Vikings traded G Danny Isidora to the Miami Dolphins in exchange for a seventh-round selection (219th overall).)
7	225	Kenny Willekes	DE	Michigan State	From Ravens
7	239	Traded to the Buffalo Bills			
7	244	Nate Stanley	QB	Iowa	From Saints
7	249	Brian Cole II	S	Mississippi State	Compensatory pick
7	253	Kyle Hinton	G	Washburn	Compensatory pick

Notes

- The Vikings were awarded three compensatory selections at the NFL's annual spring owners' meetings. They received one additional pick in the third round and two in the seventh round, compensating for the losses of Sheldon Richardson, Trevor Siemian and Tom Compton.

Draft trades

2020 Minnesota Vikings undrafted free agents
Name	Position	College	Ref.
Brady Aiello	OL	Oregon	
Jake Bargas	TE	North Carolina	
Dan Chisena	WR	Penn State	
Nevelle Clarke	CB	UCF	
Quartney Davis	WR	Texas A&M	
Myles Dorn	CB	North Carolina	
Jordan Fehr	LB	Appalachian State	
Nakia Griffin-Stewart	TE	Pittsburgh	
Tyler Higby	OL	Michigan State	
Jake Lacina	OL	Augustana (SD)	
Blake Lynch	LB	Baylor	
David Moa	DT	Boise State	

== Staff ==
2020 Minnesota Vikings staff
Front office: Owner/chairman – Zygi Wilf; Owner/president – Mark Wilf; Owner/vice chairman – Leonard Wilf; Owner/executive vice president – Jonathan Wilf; Chief operating officer – Andrew Miller; General manager – Rick Spielman; Vice president of player personnel/assistant general manager – George Paton; Executive vice president of football operations – Rob Brzezinski; Director of college scouting – Jamaal Stephenson; Director of pro scouting – Ryan Monnens; Director of analytics – Scott Kuhn; Consultant – Bud Grant; Head coaches: Head coach – Mike Zimmer; Assistant head coach/offensive coordinator – Gary Kubiak; Offensive coaches: Quarterbacks – Klint Kubiak; Running backs – Kennedy Polamalu; Wide receivers – Andrew Janocko; Tight ends – Brian Pariani; Run game coordinator/offensive line – Rick Dennison; Assistant offensive line – Phil Rauscher; Offensive quality control – Christian Jones; Offensive quality control – AC Patterson	Defensive coaches: Co-defensive coordinator/defensive line – Andre Patterson; Co-defensive coordinator/linebackers – Adam Zimmer; Assistant defensive line – Imarjaye Albury; Defensive backs – Daronte Jones; Assistant defensive backs – Roy Anderson; Senior defensive assistant – Dom Capers; Defensive quality control – Nick Rallis; Special teams coaches: Special teams coordinator – Marwan Maalouf; Assistant special teams – Ryan Ficken; Kicking consultant – Nate Kaeding; Strength and conditioning: Head strength and conditioning – Mark Uyeyama; Assistant strength and conditioning – Derik Keyes; Assistant strength and conditioning – Chaz Mahle

== Final roster ==
2020 Minnesota Vikings roster
Quarterbacks (QB): 8 Kirk Cousins; 4 Sean Mannion; Running backs (RB): 31 Ameer Abdullah; 23 Mike Boone; 33 Dalvin Cook; 30 C. J. Ham FB; 25 Alexander Mattison; Wide receivers (WR): 12 Chad Beebe; 85 Dan Chisena; 18 Justin Jefferson; 81 Bisi Johnson; 17 K. J. Osborn RS; 19 Adam Thielen; Tight ends (TE): 83 Tyler Conklin; 87 Hale Hentges; 84 Irv Smith Jr.	Offensive linemen (OL): 56 Garrett Bradbury C; 72 Ezra Cleveland G; 78 Dakota Dozier G; 69 Rashod Hill T; 68 Kyle Hinton G; 61 Brett Jones C; 75 Brian O'Neill T; 73 Dru Samia G; 74 Oli Udoh T; Defensive linemen (DL): 67 Jordan Brailford DE; 90 Jalyn Holmes DE; 94 Jaleel Johnson DT; 92 James Lynch DT; 51 Hercules Mata'afa DE; 95 Ifeadi Odenigbo DE; 93 Shamar Stephen DT; 96 Armon Watts DT; 98 D. J. Wonnum DE; 52 Eddie Yarbrough DE	Linebackers (LB): 57 Ryan Connelly OLB; 40 Todd Davis MLB; 45 Troy Dye MLB; 54 Eric Kendricks MLB; 48 Blake Lynch OLB; 50 Eric Wilson OLB; Defensive backs (DB): 27 Cameron Dantzler CB; 20 Jeff Gladney CB; 38 Harrison Hand CB; 41 Anthony Harris FS; 36 Tae Hayes CB; 26 Chris Jones CB; 39 Dylan Mabin CB; 44 Josh Metellus S; 22 Harrison Smith SS; 32 Cordrea Tankersley CB; Special teams (ST): 5 Dan Bailey K; 2 Britton Colquitt P; 42 Andrew DePaola LS	Practice squad: 66 Abdullah Anderson DT; 65 Zack Bailey G; 34 Jake Bargas FB; 6 Taylor Bertolet K; 64 Blake Brandel T; 3 Jake Browning QB; 76 Aviante Collins T; 86 Brandon Dillon TE (COVID-19); 35 Luther Kirk S; 24 Khalfani Muhammad RB; 47 Hardy Nickerson Jr. OLB; 37 Curtis Riley SS; 7 Nate Stanley QB; Reserve: 55 Anthony Barr OLB (IR); 29 Kris Boyd CB (IR); 46 Myles Dorn S (IR); 21 Mike Hughes CB (IR); 99 Danielle Hunter DE (IR); 43 George Iloka S (IR); 97 Michael Pierce DT (Opt-out); 71 Riley Reiff T (COVID-19); 82 Kyle Rudolph TE (IR); 59 Cameron Smith MLB (NF-Ill.); 79 Kenny Willekes DE (IR); Rookies in italics 52 active, 11 reserve, 15 practice squad (1 exempt)

== Preseason ==
The Vikings' preseason schedule was announced on May 7, but was canceled in late July due to the COVID-19 pandemic.

Week	Date	Opponent	Venue	Result
1	August 14	Houston Texans	U.S. Bank Stadium	Canceled due to the COVID-19 pandemic
2	August 21	at Cincinnati Bengals	Paul Brown Stadium	Canceled due to the COVID-19 pandemic
3	August 30	at Cleveland Browns	FirstEnergy Stadium	Canceled due to the COVID-19 pandemic
4	September 3	Seattle Seahawks	U.S. Bank Stadium	Canceled due to the COVID-19 pandemic

== Regular season ==
=== Schedule ===
The Vikings' 2020 schedule was announced on May 7.

Week	Date	Opponent	Result	Record	Venue	Attendance	Recap
1	September 13	**Green Bay Packers**	**L** 34–43	0–1	U.S. Bank Stadium	0	Recap
2	September 20	at Indianapolis Colts	**L** 11–28	0–2	Lucas Oil Stadium	2,500	Recap
3	September 27	Tennessee Titans	**L** 30–31	0–3	U.S. Bank Stadium	250	Recap
4	October 4	at Houston Texans	**W** 31–23	1–3	NRG Stadium	12,102	Recap
5	October 11	at Seattle Seahawks	**L** 26–27	1–4	CenturyLink Field	0	Recap
6	October 18	Atlanta Falcons	**L** 23–40	1–5	U.S. Bank Stadium	0	Recap
7	Bye						
8	November 1	at **Green Bay Packers**	**W** 28–22	2–5	Lambeau Field	0	Recap
9	November 8	**Detroit Lions**	**W** 34–20	3–5	U.S. Bank Stadium	0	Recap
10	November 16	at **Chicago Bears**	**W** 19–13	4–5	Soldier Field	0	Recap
11	November 22	Dallas Cowboys	**L** 28–31	4–6	U.S. Bank Stadium	0	Recap
12	November 29	Carolina Panthers	**W** 28–27	5–6	U.S. Bank Stadium	0	Recap
13	December 6	Jacksonville Jaguars	**W** 27–24 (OT)	6–6	U.S. Bank Stadium	0	Recap
14	December 13	at Tampa Bay Buccaneers	**L** 14–26	6–7	Raymond James Stadium	16,031	Recap
15	December 20	**Chicago Bears**	**L** 27–33	6–8	U.S. Bank Stadium	0	Recap
16	December 25	at New Orleans Saints	**L** 33–52	6–9	Mercedes-Benz Superdome	3,000	Recap
17	January 3	at **Detroit Lions**	**W** 37–35	7–9	Ford Field	0	Recap

Note: Intra-division opponents are in bold text.

=== Game summaries ===
==== Week 1: vs. Green Bay Packers ====
Week 1: Green Bay Packers at Minnesota Vikings – Game summary

Quarter	1	2	3	4	Total
**Packers**	3	19	7	14	**43**
Vikings	7	3	0	24	**34**

at U.S. Bank Stadium, Minneapolis, Minnesota

- Date: September 13
- Game time: 12:00 p.m. CDT
- Game weather: None (indoor stadium)
- Game attendance: 0
- Referee: Bill Vinovich (52)
- TV announcers (Fox): Chris Myers, Greg Jennings, Brock Huard and Jen Hale
- Recap, Game Book

Game information

**First quarter**

- GB – Mason Crosby 31-yard field goal, 7:27. Packers 3–0. **Drive: 13 plays, 63 yards, 7:33.**
- MIN – Dalvin Cook 1-yard run (Dan Bailey kick), 3:24. Vikings 7–3. **Drive: 8 plays, 75 yards, 4:03.**

**Second quarter**

- GB – Kirk Cousins sacked in the end zone by Jaire Alexander for a safety, 11:39. Vikings 7–5.
- GB – Mason Crosby 43-yard field goal, 8:08. Packers 8–7. **Drive: 8 plays, 31 yards, 3:31.**
- GB – Davante Adams 24-yard pass from Aaron Rodgers (Mason Crosby kick), 0:39. Packers 15–7. **Drive: 11 plays, 60 yards, 5:25.**
- GB – Marquez Valdes-Scantling 45-yard pass from Aaron Rodgers (Mason Crosby kick), 0:14. Packers 22–7. **Drive: 2 plays, 45 yards, 0:11.**
- MIN – Dan Bailey 35-yard field goal, 0:00. Packers 22–10. **Drive: 3 plays, 58 yards, 0:14.**

**Third quarter**

- GB – Davante Adams 1-yard pass from Aaron Rodgers (Mason Crosby kick), 0:09. Packers 29–10. **Drive: 8 plays, 61 yards, 4:11.**

**Fourth quarter**

- MIN – Adam Thielen 37-yard pass from Kirk Cousins (Dalvin Cook run), 13:53. Packers 29–18. **Drive: 4 plays, 77 yards, 1:16.**
- GB – Allen Lazard 4-yard pass from Aaron Rodgers (Mason Crosby kick), 10:02. Packers 36–18. **Drive: 7 plays, 75 yards, 3:51.**
- MIN – Dalvin Cook 3-yard run (Dalvin Cook run), 7:55. Packers 36–26. **Drive: 7 plays, 65 yards, 2:07.**
- GB – Aaron Jones 5-yard run (Mason Crosby kick), 3:19. Packers 43–26. **Drive: 8 plays, 75 yards, 4:36.**
- MIN – Adam Thielen 19-yard pass from Kirk Cousins (Kirk Cousins–Adam Thielen pass), 1:21. Packers 43–34. **Drive: 9 plays, 75 yards, 1:58.**

**Top passers**

- GB – Aaron Rodgers – 32/44, 364 yards, 4 TD
- MIN – Kirk Cousins – 19/25, 259 yards, 2 TD, INT

**Top rushers**

- GB – Aaron Jones – 16 rushes, 66 yards, TD
- MIN – Dalvin Cook – 12 rushes, 50 yards, 2 TD

**Top receivers**

- GB – Davante Adams – 14 receptions, 156 yards, 2 TD
- MIN – Adam Thielen – 6 receptions, 110 yards, 2 TD

This was the Vikings' first loss in their season opener since 2015. The 43 points scored by the Packers was the most the Vikings had conceded in a season opener in franchise history. Wide receiver Adam Thielen scored two touchdowns for the first time since Week 5 of the 2019 season against the New York Giants.

==== Week 2: at Indianapolis Colts ====
Week 2: Minnesota Vikings at Indianapolis Colts – Game summary

Quarter	1	2	3	4	Total
Vikings	3	0	0	8	**11**
**Colts**	0	15	3	10	**28**

at Lucas Oil Stadium, Indianapolis, Indiana

- Date: September 20
- Game time: 12:00 pm. CDT/1:00 p.m. EDT
- Game weather: Sunny, 65 °F (18 °C) (retractable roof open)
- Game attendance: 2,500
- Referee: Alex Kemp (55)
- TV announcers (Fox): Tim Brando, Robert Smith and Megan Olivi
- Recap, Game Book

Game information

**First quarter**

- MIN – Dan Bailey 21-yard field goal, 9:01. Vikings 3–0. **Drive: 13 plays, 75 yards, 5:59.**

**Second quarter**

- IND – Jonathan Taylor 5-yard run (Rodrigo Blankenship kick), 11:45. Colts 7–3. **Drive: 4 plays, 35 yards, 1:29.**
- IND – Kirk Cousins sacked in the endzone by DeForest Buckner for a safety, 4:54. Colts 9–3.
- IND – Rodrigo Blankenship 28-yard field goal, 1:10. Colts 12–3. **Drive: 8 plays, 58 yards, 3:44.**
- IND – Rodrigo Blankenship 38-yard field goal, 0:24. Colts 15–3. **Drive: 4 plays, 9 yards, 0:21.**

**Third quarter**

- IND – Rodrigo Blankenship 38-yard field goal, 9:27. Colts 18–3. **Drive: 4 plays, 2 yards, 1:26.**

**Fourth quarter**

- IND – Zach Pascal 2-yard pass from Philip Rivers (Rodrigo Blankenship kick), 14:00. Colts 25–3. **Drive: 10 plays, 65 yards, 6:25.**
- IND – Rodrigo Blankenship 44-yard field goal, 8:47. Colts 28–3. **Drive: 6 plays, 36 yards, 3:43.**
- MIN – Dalvin Cook 3-yard run (Dalvin Cook run), 5:20. Colts 28–11. **Drive: 8 plays, 75 yards, 3:27.**

**Top passers**

- MIN – Kirk Cousins – 11/26, 113 yards, 3 INT
- IND – Philip Rivers – 19/25, 214 yards, TD, INT

**Top rushers**

- MIN – Dalvin Cook – 14 rushes, 63 yards, TD
- IND – Jonathan Taylor – 26 rushes, 101 yards, TD

**Top receivers**

- MIN – Justin Jefferson – 3 receptions, 44 yards
- IND – Mo Alie-Cox – 5 receptions, 111 yards

This loss dropped the Vikings to 0–2 for the first time since 2013. Quarterback Kirk Cousins was intercepted three times on 26 pass attempts that included just 11 completions for 113 yards; he ended up with a passer rating of 15.9.

==== Week 3: vs. Tennessee Titans ====
Week 3: Tennessee Titans at Minnesota Vikings – Game summary

Quarter	1	2	3	4	Total
**Titans**	6	3	16	6	**31**
Vikings	7	10	7	6	**30**

at U.S. Bank Stadium, Minneapolis, Minnesota

- Date: September 27
- Game time: 12:00 pm. CDT
- Game weather: None (indoor stadium)
- Game attendance: 0
- Referee: Clete Blakeman (34)
- TV announcers (CBS): Andrew Catalon, James Lofton and A. J. Ross
- Recap, Game Book

Game information

**First quarter**

- TEN – Stephen Gostkowski 39-yard field goal, 11:44. Titans 3–0. **Drive: 6 plays, 54 yards, 3:16.**
- TEN – Stephen Gostkowski 31-yard field goal, 6:01. Titans 6–0. **Drive: 4 plays, 7 yards, 0:52.**
- MIN – Dalvin Cook 39-yard run (Dan Bailey kick), 2:43. Vikings 7–6. **Drive: 7 plays, 76 yards, 3:18.**

**Second quarter**

- MIN – Adam Thielen 16-yard pass from Kirk Cousins (Dan Bailey kick), 8:56. Vikings 14–6. **Drive: 10 plays, 88 yards, 5:52.**
- TEN – Stephen Gostkowski 30-yard field goal, 3:18. Vikings 14–9. **Drive: 12 plays, 63 yards, 5:38.**
- MIN – Dan Bailey 41-yard field goal, 1:41. Vikings 17–9. **Drive: 7 plays, 52 yards, 1:37.**

**Third quarter**

- TEN – Stephen Gostkowski 51-yard field goal, 8:57. Vikings 17–12. **Drive: 5 plays, 28 yards, 1:18.**
- MIN – Justin Jefferson 71-yard pass from Kirk Cousins (Dan Bailey kick), 8:04. Vikings 24–12. **Drive: 2 plays, 73 yards, 0:53.**
- TEN – Derrick Henry 1-yard run (Stephen Gostkowski kick), 3:53. Vikings 24–19. **Drive: 8 plays, 75 yards, 4:11.**
- TEN – Derrick Henry 1-yard run (pass failed), 1:22. Titans 25–24. **Drive: 3 plays, 65 yards, 1:17.**

**Fourth players**

- MIN – Kyle Rudolph 3-yard pass from Kirk Cousins (pass failed), 10:17. Vikings 30–25. **Drive: 10 plays, 75 yards, 6:05.**
- TEN – Stephen Gostkowski 54-yard field goal, 6:31. Vikings 30–28. **Drive: 10 plays, 39 yards, 3:46.**
- TEN – Stephen Gostkowski 55-yard field goal, 1:44. Titans 31–30. **Drive: 9 plays, 44 yards, 1:58.**

**Top passers**

- TEN – Ryan Tannehill – 23/37, 321 yards, INT
- MIN – Kirk Cousins – 16/27, 251 yards, 3 TD, 2 INT

**Top rushers**

- TEN – Derrick Henry – 26 rushes, 119 yards, 2 TD
- MIN – Dalvin Cook – 22 rushes, 181 yards, TD

**Top receivers**

- TEN – Kalif Raymond – 3 receptions, 118 yards
- MIN – Justin Jefferson – 7 receptions, 175 yards, TD

==== Week 4: at Houston Texans ====
Week 4: Minnesota Vikings at Houston Texans – Game summary

Quarter	1	2	3	4	Total
**Vikings**	7	10	7	7	**31**
Texans	0	6	10	7	**23**

at NRG Stadium, Houston, Texas

- Date: October 4
- Game time: 12:00 pm. CDT
- Game weather: None (retractable roof closed)
- Game attendance: 12,102
- Referee: Brad Rogers (126)
- TV announcers (Fox): Chris Myers, Greg Jennings, Brock Huard and Jen Hale
- Recap, Game Book

Game information

**First quarter**

- MIN – Dalvin Cook 5-yard run (Dan Bailey kick), 5:05. Vikings 7–0. **Drive: 7 plays, 56 yards, 4:13.**

**Second quarter**

- MIN – Dan Bailey 31-yard field goal, 12:41. Vikings 10–0. **Drive: 7 plays, 22 yards, 3:26.**
- HOU – Kaʻimi Fairbairn 50-yard field goal, 8:46. Vikings 10–3. **Drive: 10 plays, 43 yards, 3:55.**
- MIN – Dalvin Cook 7-yard run (Dan Bailey kick), 1:53. Vikings 17–3. **Drive: 12 plays, 75 yards, 6:53.**
- HOU – Kaʻimi Fairbairn 28-yard field goal, 0:27. Vikings 17–6. **Drive: 8 plays, 58 yards, 1:26.**

**Third quarter**

- HOU – Will Fuller 24-yard pass from Deshaun Watson (Kaʻimi Fairbairn kick), 9:47. Vikings 17–13. **Drive: 7 plays, 73 yards, 3:02.**
- HOU – Kaʻimi Fairbairn 25-yard field goal, 5:30. Vikings 17–16. **Drive: 6 plays, 48 yards, 1:54.**
- MIN – Adam Thielen 9-yard pass from Kirk Cousins (Dan Bailey kick), 0:41. Vikings 24–16. **Drive: 8 plays, 75 yards, 4:49.**

**Fourth quarter**

- MIN – Alexander Mattison 4-yard run (Dan Bailey kick), 10:50. Vikings 31–16. **Drive: 6 plays, 73 yards, 3:20.**
- HOU – Kenny Stills 24-yard pass from Deshaun Watson (Kaʻimi Fairbairn kick), 5:52. Vikings 31–23. **Drive: 9 plays, 77 yards, 4:58.**

**Top passers**

- MIN – Kirk Cousins – 16/22, 260 yards, TD
- HOU – Deshaun Watson – 20/33, 300 yards, 2 TD

**Top rushers**

- MIN – Dalvin Cook – 27 rushes, 130 yards, 2 TD
- HOU – David Johnson – 16 rushes, 63 yards

**Top receivers**

- MIN – Adam Thielen – 8 receptions, 114 yards, TD
- HOU – Will Fuller – 6 receptions, 108 yards, TD

==== Week 5: at Seattle Seahawks ====
Week 5: Minnesota Vikings at Seattle Seahawks – Game summary

Quarter	1	2	3	4	Total
Vikings	7	6	6	7	**26**
**Seahawks**	0	0	21	6	**27**

at CenturyLink Field, Seattle, Washington

- Date: October 11
- Game time: 7:20 pm. CDT/5:20 p.m. PDT
- Game weather: Rain, 54 °F (12 °C)
- Game attendance: 0
- Referee: Tony Corrente (99)
- TV announcers (NBC): Al Michaels, Cris Collinsworth, Michele Tafoya and Terry McAulay
- Recap, Game Book

Game information

**First quarter**

- MIN – Dalvin Cook 8-yard run (Dan Bailey kick), 8:48. Vikings 7–0. **Drive: 12 plays, 77 yards, 6:12.**

**Second quarter**

- MIN – Dan Bailey 52-yard field goal, 8:33. Vikings 10–0. **Drive: 17 plays, 64 yards, 10:13.**
- MIN – Dan Bailey 46-yard field goal, 0:10. Vikings 13–0. **Drive: 11 plays, 57 yards, 1:37.**

**Third quarter**

- SEA – Will Dissly 19-yard pass from Russell Wilson (Jason Myers kick), 9:55. Vikings 13–7. **Drive: 4 plays, 58 yards, 1:42.**
- SEA – DK Metcalf 13-yard pass from Russell Wilson (Jason Myers kick), 8:19. Seahawks 14–13. **Drive: 2 plays, 15 yards, 0:39.**
- SEA – Chris Carson 29-yard run (Jason Myers kick), 8:02. Seahawks 21–13. **Drive: 1 play, 29 yards, 0:07.**
- MIN – Adam Thielen 3-yard pass from Kirk Cousins (run failed), 3:39. Seahawks 21–19. **Drive: 11 plays, 77 yards, 4:23.**

**Fourth quarter**

- MIN – Adam Thielen 6-yard pass from Kirk Cousins (Dan Bailey kick), 7:08. Vikings 26–21. **Drive: 15 plays, 97 yards, 8:11.**
- SEA – DK Metcalf 6-yard pass from Russell Wilson (pass failed), 0:15. Seahawks 27–26. **Drive: 13 plays, 94 yards, 1:42.**

**Top passers**

- MIN – Kirk Cousins – 27/39, 249 yards, 2 TD, INT
- SEA – Russell Wilson – 20/32, 217 yards, 3 TD, INT

**Top rushers**

- MIN – Alexander Mattison – 20 rushes, 112 yards
- SEA – Russell Wilson – 5 rushes, 58 yards

**Top receivers**

- MIN – Adam Thielen – 9 receptions, 80 yards, 2 TD
- SEA – DK Metcalf – 6 receptions, 93 yards, 2 TD

==== Week 6: vs. Atlanta Falcons ====
Week 6: Atlanta Falcons at Minnesota Vikings – Game summary

Quarter	1	2	3	4	Total
**Falcons**	10	10	10	10	**40**
Vikings	0	0	7	16	**23**

at U.S. Bank Stadium, Minneapolis, Minnesota

- Date: October 18
- Game time: 12:00 pm. CDT
- Game weather: None (indoor stadium)
- Game attendance: 0
- Referee: Craig Wrolstad (4)
- TV announcers (Fox): Brandon Gaudin, Daryl Johnston and Pam Oliver
- Recap, Game Book

Game information

**First quarter**

- ATL – Julio Jones 20-yard pass from Matt Ryan (Younghoe Koo kick), 12:02. Falcons 7–0. **Drive: 5 plays, 29 yards, 2:41.**
- ATL – Younghoe Koo 50-yard field goal, 3:02. Falcons 10–0. **Drive: 13 plays, 54 yards, 6:51.**

**Second quarter**

- ATL – Calvin Ridley 8-yard pass from Matt Ryan (Younghoe Koo kick), 1:54. Falcons 17–0. **Drive: 7 plays, 40 yards, 3:52.**
- ATL – Younghoe Koo 21-yard field goal, 0:01. Falcons 20–0. **Drive: 9 plays, 46 yards, 1:05.**

**Third quarter**

- ATL – Younghoe Koo 47-yard field goal, 10:45. Falcons 23–0. **Drive: 10 plays, 56 yards, 4:15.**
- MIN – Justin Jefferson 11-yard pass from Kirk Cousins (Dan Bailey kick), 6:25. Falcons 23–7. **Drive: 9 plays, 75 yards, 4:20.**
- ATL – Julio Jones 40-yard pass from Matt Ryan (Younghoe Koo kick), 2:01. Falcons 30–7. **Drive: 8 plays, 69 yards, 4:24.**

**Fourth quarter**

- ATL – Younghoe Koo 43-yard field goal, 7:07. Falcons 33–7. **Drive: 8 plays, 42 yards, 3:33.**
- MIN – Adam Thielen 2-yard pass from Kirk Cousins (Kirk Cousins-Irv Smith Jr. pass), 3:58. Falcons 33–15. **Drive: 8 plays, 75 yards, 3:09.**
- ATL – Hayden Hurst 35-yard pass from Matt Ryan (Younghoe Koo kick), 2:11. Falcons 40–15. **Drive: 4 plays, 44 yards, 1:47.**
- MIN – Justin Jefferson 49-yard pass from Kirk Cousins (Kirk Cousins-Justin Jefferson pass), 1:26. Falcons 40–23. **Drive: 3 plays, 80 yards, 0:45.**

**Top passers**

- ATL – Matt Ryan – 30/40, 371 yards, 4 TD
- MIN – Kirk Cousins – 24/36, 343 yards, 3 TD, 3 INT

**Top rushers**

- ATL – Todd Gurley – 20 rushes, 47 yards
- MIN – Alexander Mattison – 10 rushes, 26 yards

**Top receivers**

- ATL – Julio Jones – 8 receptions, 137 yards, 2 TD
- MIN – Justin Jefferson – 9 receptions, 166 yards, 2 TD

==== Week 8: at Green Bay Packers ====
Week 8: Minnesota Vikings at Green Bay Packers – Game summary

Quarter	1	2	3	4	Total
**Vikings**	7	7	14	0	**28**
Packers	7	7	0	8	**22**

at Lambeau Field, Green Bay, Wisconsin

- Date: November 1
- Game time: 12:00 pm. CST
- Game weather: Cloudy and windy, 34 °F (1 °C)
- Game attendance: 0
- Referee: Alex Kemp (55)
- TV announcers (Fox): Kevin Burkhardt, Daryl Johnston and Pam Oliver
- Recap, Game Book

Game information

**First quarter**

- GB – Davante Adams 5-yard pass from Aaron Rodgers (Mason Crosby kick), 7:01. Packers 7–0. **Drive: 13 plays, 75 yards, 7:59.**
- MIN – Dalvin Cook 21-yard run (Dan Bailey kick), 0:47. Tied 7–7. **Drive: 10 plays, 73 yards, 6:14.**

**Second quarter**

- GB – Davante Adams 1-yard pass from Aaron Rodgers (Mason Crosby kick), 6:53. Packers 14–7. **Drive: 15 plays, 72 yards, 8:54.**
- MIN – Dalvin Cook 1-yard run (Dan Bailey kick), 0:31. Tied 14–14. **Drive: 12 plays, 67 yards, 6:22.**

**Third quarter**

- MIN – Dalvin Cook 1-yard run (Dan Bailey kick), 10:00. Vikings 21–14. **Drive: 10 plays, 85 yards, 5:00.**
- MIN – Dalvin Cook 50-yard pass from Kirk Cousins (Dan Bailey kick), 5:52. Vikings 28–14. **Drive: 4 plays, 63 yards, 2:06.**

**Fourth quarter**

- GB – Davante Adams 7-yard pass from Aaron Rodgers (Jamaal Williams run), 2:42. Vikings 28–22. **Drive: 9 plays, 74 yards, 3:05.**

**Top passers**

- MIN – Kirk Cousins – 11/14, 160 yards, TD
- GB – Aaron Rodgers – 27/41, 291 yards, 3 TD

**Top rushers**

- MIN – Dalvin Cook – 30 rushes, 163 yards, 3 TD
- GB – Jamaal Williams – 16 rushes, 75 yards

**Top receivers**

- MIN – Dalvin Cook – 2 receptions, 63 yards, TD
- GB – Robert Tonyan – 5 receptions, 79 yards

==== Week 9: vs. Detroit Lions ====
Week 9: Detroit Lions at Minnesota Vikings – Game summary

Quarter	1	2	3	4	Total
Lions	0	10	0	10	**20**
**Vikings**	13	7	7	7	**34**

at U.S. Bank Stadium, Minneapolis, Minnesota

- Date: November 8
- Game time: 12:00 pm. CST
- Game weather: None (indoor stadium)
- Game attendance: 0
- Referee: Clete Blakeman (34)
- TV announcers (CBS): Kevin Harlan, Trent Green and Melanie Collins
- Recap, Game Book

Game information

**First quarter**

- MIN – Dalvin Cook 5-yard run (Dan Bailey kick), 10:39. Vikings 7–0. **Drive: 5 plays, 67 yards, 2:32.**
- MIN – Irv Smith Jr. 9-yard pass from Kirk Cousins (kick failed, wide right), 1:26. Vikings 13–0. **Drive: 5 plays, 64 yards, 2:41.**

**Second quarter**

- DET – Matt Prater 23-yard field goal, 8:21. Vikings 13–3. **Drive: 15 plays, 70 yards, 8:05.**
- DET – Marvin Jones 15-yard pass from Matthew Stafford (Matt Prater kick), 1:19. Vikings 13–10. **Drive: 8 plays, 72 yards, 3:52.**
- MIN – Ameer Abdullah 22-yard pass from Kirk Cousins (Dan Bailey kick), 0:15. Vikings 20–10. **Drive: 6 plays, 87 yards, 1:04.**

**Third quarter**

- MIN – Irv Smith Jr. 1-yard pass from Kirk Cousins (Dan Bailey kick), 7:50. Vikings 27–10. **Drive: 9 plays, 77 yards, 4:09.**

**Fourth quarter**

- DET – Matt Prater 45-yard field goal, 11:02. Vikings 27–13. **Drive: 8 plays, 42 yards, 3:33.**
- MIN – Dalvin Cook 70-yard run (Dan Bailey kick), 10:42. Vikings 34–13. **Drive: 1 play, 70 yards, 0:20.**
- DET – T. J. Hockenson 2-yard pass from Chase Daniel (Matt Prater kick), 6:55. Vikings 34–20. **Drive: 1 play, 2 yards, 0:03.**

**Top passers**

- DET – Matthew Stafford – 23/32, 211 yards, TD, 2 INT
- MIN – Kirk Cousins – 13/20, 220 yards, 3 TD

**Top rushers**

- DET – D'Andre Swift – 13 rushes, 64 yards
- MIN – Dalvin Cook – 22 rushes, 206 yards, 2 TD

**Top receivers**

- DET – Danny Amendola – 7 receptions, 77 yards
- MIN – Justin Jefferson – 3 receptions, 64 yards

==== Week 10: at Chicago Bears ====
Week 10: Minnesota Vikings at Chicago Bears – Game summary

Quarter	1	2	3	4	Total
**Vikings**	7	0	6	6	**19**
Bears	3	3	7	0	**13**

at Soldier Field, Chicago, Illinois

- Date: November 16
- Game time: 7:15 pm. CST
- Game weather: Clear, 44 °F (7 °C)
- Game attendance: 0
- Referee: Scott Novak (1)
- TV announcers (ESPN): Steve Levy, Brian Griese, Louis Riddick, Lisa Salters and John Parry
- Recap, Game Book

Game information

**First quarter**

- MIN – Adam Thielen 17-yard pass from Kirk Cousins (Dan Bailey kick), 6:29. Vikings 7–0. **Drive: 6 plays, 41 yards, 3:05.**
- CHI – Cairo Santos 23-yard field goal, 0:32. Vikings 7–3. **Drive: 14 plays, 70 yards, 5:57.**

**Second quarter**

- CHI – Cairo Santos 42-yard field goal, 0:49. Vikings 7–6. **Drive: 5 plays, 21 yards, 1:02.**

**Third quarter**

- CHI – Cordarrelle Patterson 104-yard kickoff return (Cairo Santos kick), 14:46. Bears 13–7.
- MIN – Dan Bailey 37-yard field goal, 10:50. Bears 13–10. **Drive: 4 plays, 1 yard, 0:54.**
- MIN – Dan Bailey 43-yard field goal, 1:52. Tied 13–13. **Drive: 7 plays, 60 yards, 3:20.**

**Fourth quarter**

- MIN – Adam Thielen 6-yard pass from Kirk Cousins (pass failed), 10:06. Vikings 19–13. **Drive: 9 plays, 63 yards, 4:43.**

**Top passers**

- MIN – Kirk Cousins – 25/36, 292 yards, 2 TD, INT
- CHI – Nick Foles – 15/26, 106 yards, INT

**Top rushers**

- MIN – Dalvin Cook – 30 rushes, 96 yards
- CHI – Cordarrelle Patterson – 12 rushes, 30 yards

**Top receivers**

- MIN – Justin Jefferson – 8 receptions, 135 yards
- CHI – Allen Robinson – 6 receptions, 43 yards

==== Week 11: vs. Dallas Cowboys ====
Week 11: Dallas Cowboys at Minnesota Vikings – Game summary

Quarter	1	2	3	4	Total
**Cowboys**	6	10	0	15	**31**
Vikings	7	0	7	14	**28**

at U.S. Bank Stadium, Minneapolis, Minnesota

- Date: November 22
- Game time: 3:25 pm. CST
- Game weather: None (indoor stadium)
- Game attendance: 0
- Referee: Bill Vinovich (52)
- TV announcers (Fox): Kenny Albert, Jonathan Vilma and Shannon Spake
- Recap, Game Book

Game information

**First quarter**

- DAL – Ezekiel Elliott 6-yard pass from Andy Dalton (kick blocked), 9:26. Cowboys 6–0. **Drive: 3 plays, 30 yards, 1:31.**
- MIN – Dalvin Cook 1-yard run (Dan Bailey kick), 2:11. Vikings 7–6. **Drive: 12 plays, 75 yards, 7:15.**

**Second quarter**

- DAL – CeeDee Lamb 4-yard pass from Andy Dalton (Greg Zuerlein kick), 4:55. Cowboys 13–7. **Drive: 9 plays, 52 yards, 5:01.**
- DAL – Greg Zuerlein 19-yard field goal, 0:02. Cowboys 16–7. **Drive: 5 plays, 47 yards, 0:47.**

**Third quarter**

- MIN – Adam Thielen 2-yard pass from Kirk Cousins (Dan Bailey kick), 9:50. Cowboys 16–14. **Drive: 9 plays, 75 yards, 5:10.**

**Fourth quarter**

- MIN – Adam Thielen 3-yard pass from Kirk Cousins (Dan Bailey kick), 14:57. Vikings 21–16. **Drive: 12 plays, 81 yards, 6:47.**
- DAL – Tony Pollard 42-yard run (CeeDee Lamb run), 12:02. Cowboys 24–21. **Drive: 5 plays, 75 yards, 2:55.**
- MIN – Justin Jefferson 39-yard pass from Kirk Cousins (Dan Bailey kick), 9:37. Vikings 28–24. **Drive: 5 plays, 75 yards, 2:25.**
- DAL – Dalton Schultz 2-yard pass from Andy Dalton (Greg Zuerlein kick), 1:37. Cowboys 31–28. **Drive: 11 plays, 61 yards, 2:23.**

**Top passers**

- DAL – Andy Dalton – 22/32, 203 yards, 3 TD, INT
- MIN – Kirk Cousins – 22/30, 314 yards, 3 TD

**Top rushers**

- DAL – Ezekiel Elliott – 21 rushes, 103 yards
- MIN – Dalvin Cook – 27 rushes, 115 yards, TD

**Top receivers**

- DAL – Amari Cooper – 6 receptions, 81 yards
- MIN – Adam Thielen – 8 receptions, 123 yards, 2 TD

==== Week 12: vs. Carolina Panthers ====
Week 12: Carolina Panthers at Minnesota Vikings – Game summary

Quarter	1	2	3	4	Total
Panthers	0	7	14	6	**27**
**Vikings**	7	3	0	18	**28**

at U.S. Bank Stadium, Minneapolis, Minnesota

- Date: November 29
- Game time: 12:00 pm. CST
- Game weather: None (indoor stadium)
- Game attendance: 0
- Referee: Brad Rogers (126)
- TV announcers (Fox): Kenny Albert, Jonathan Vilma and Shannon Spake
- Recap, Game Book

Game information

**First quarter**

- MIN – Justin Jefferson 12-yard pass from Kirk Cousins (Dan Bailey kick), 5:34. Vikings 7–0. **Drive: 13 plays, 68 yards, 7:38.**

**Second quarter**

- CAR – Robby Anderson 41-yard pass from Teddy Bridgewater (Joey Slye kick), 1:52. Tied 7–7. **Drive: 11 plays, 81 yards, 5:33.**
- MIN – Dan Bailey 53-yard field goal, 0:00. Vikings 10–7. **Drive: 11 plays, 41 yards, 1:52.**

**Third quarter**

- CAR – Jeremy Chinn 17-yard fumble return (Joey Slye kick), 14:01. Panthers 14–10.
- CAR – Jeremy Chinn 28-yard fumble return (Joey Slye kick), 13:51. Panthers 21–10.

**Fourth quarter**

- MIN – Dan Bailey 25-yard field goal, 14:47. Panthers 21–13. **Drive: 12 plays, 72 yards, 5:34.**
- CAR – Joey Slye 40-yard field goal, 11:31. Panthers 24–13. **Drive: 9 plays, 53 yards, 3:16.**
- MIN – Justin Jefferson 10-yard pass from Kirk Cousins (Kirk Cousins–Bisi Johnson pass), 5:31. Panthers 24–21. **Drive: 11 plays, 75 yards, 6:00.**
- CAR – Joey Slye 21-yard field goal, 1:51. Panthers 27–21. **Drive: 4 plays, 6 yards, 0:19.**
- MIN – Chad Beebe 10-yard pass from Kirk Cousins (Dan Bailey kick), 0:46. Vikings 28–27. **Drive: 7 plays, 75 yards, 1:05.**

**Top passers**

- CAR – Teddy Bridgewater – 19/36, 267 yards, TD, INT
- MIN – Kirk Cousins – 34/45, 307 yards, 3 TD

**Top rushers**

- CAR – Mike Davis – 15 rushes, 55 yards
- MIN – Dalvin Cook – 18 rushes, 61 yards

**Top receivers**

- CAR – Robby Anderson – 4 receptions, 94 yards, TD
- MIN – Bisi Johnson – 7 receptions, 74 yards

==== Week 13: vs. Jacksonville Jaguars ====
Week 13: Jacksonville Jaguars at Minnesota Vikings – Game summary

Quarter	1	2	3	4	OT	Total
Jaguars	9	0	7	8	0	**24**
**Vikings**	0	6	13	5	3	**27**

at U.S. Bank Stadium, Minneapolis, Minnesota

- Date: December 6
- Game time: 12:00 pm. CST
- Game weather: None (indoor stadium)
- Game attendance: 0
- Referee: Land Clark (130)
- TV announcers (CBS): Beth Mowins and Jay Feely
- Recap, Game Book

Game information

**First quarter**

- JAX – Laviska Shenault 28-yard pass from Mike Glennon (kick failed, wide right), 12:33. Jaguars 6–0. **Drive: 5 plays, 75 yards, 2:27.**
- JAX – Chase McLaughlin 22-yard field goal, 6:04. Jaguars 9–0. **Drive: 10 plays, 66 yards, 5:07.**

**Second quarter**

- MIN – Adam Thielen 3-yard pass from Kirk Cousins (kick failed, wide left), 2:50. Jaguars 9–6. **Drive: 10 plays, 78 yards, 4:50.**

**Third quarter**

- JAX – Joe Schobert 43-yard interception return (Chase McLaughlin kick), 14:50. Jaguars 16–6.
- MIN – C. J. Ham 12-yard pass from Kirk Cousins (Dan Bailey kick), 11:08. Jaguars 16–13. **Drive: 8 plays, 75 yards, 3:42.**
- MIN – Justin Jefferson 20-yard pass from Kirk Cousins (kick failed, wide right), 3:27. Vikings 19–16. **Drive: 8 plays, 90 yards, 3:50.**

**Fourth quarter**

- MIN – Mike Glennon sacked in the end zone by Ifeadi Odenigbo for a safety, 14:11. Vikings 21–16.
- MIN – Dan Bailey 48-yard field goal, 3:50. Vikings 24–16. **Drive: 5 plays, 14 yards, 1:39.**
- JAX – James Robinson 1-yard run (Mike Glennon–Collin Johnson pass), 1:08. Tied 24–24. **Drive: 10 plays, 75 yards, 2:42.**

**Overtime**

- MIN – Dan Bailey 23-yard field goal, 1:49. Vikings 27–24. **Drive: 11 plays, 41 yards, 5:24.**

**Top passers**

- JAX – Mike Glennon – 28/42, 280 yards, TD, 2 INT
- MIN – Kirk Cousins – 28/43, 305 yards, 3 TD, INT

**Top rushers**

- JAX – James Robinson – 18 rushes, 78 yards, TD
- MIN – Dalvin Cook – 32 rushes, 120 yards

**Top receivers**

- JAX – Collin Johnson – 4 receptions, 66 yards
- MIN – Justin Jefferson – 9 receptions, 121 yards, TD

==== Week 14: at Tampa Bay Buccaneers ====
Week 14: Minnesota Vikings at Tampa Bay Buccaneers – Game summary

Quarter	1	2	3	4	Total
Vikings	0	6	8	0	**14**
**Buccaneers**	0	17	6	3	**26**

at Raymond James Stadium, Tampa, Florida

- Date: December 13
- Game time: 12:00 pm. CST/1:00 p.m. (EST)
- Game weather: Cloudy, 78 °F (26 °C)
- Game attendance: 16,031
- Referee: Brad Allen (122)
- TV announcers (Fox): Joe Buck, Troy Aikman and Erin Andrews
- Recap, Game Book

Game information

**First quarter**

- No scoring plays.

**Second quarter**

- MIN – Dalvin Cook 1-yard run (kick failed, wide left), 14:17. Vikings 6–0. **Drive: 14 plays, 84 yards, 8:15.**
- TB – Scotty Miller 48-yard pass from Tom Brady (Ryan Succop kick), 7:41. Buccaneers 7–6. **Drive: 4 plays, 74 yards, 1:49.**
- TB – Ronald Jones II 1-yard run (Ryan Succop kick), 0:44. Buccaneers 14–6. **Drive: 10 plays, 56 yards, 3:53.**
- TB – Ryan Succop 18-yard field goal, 0:00. Buccaneers 17–6. **Drive: 4 plays, 71 yards, 0:21.**

**Third quarter**

- TB – Rob Gronkowski 2-yard pass from Tom Brady (kick failed, wide right), 10:09. Buccaneers 23–6. **Drive: 9 plays, 75 yards, 4:51.**
- MIN – Irv Smith Jr. 14-yard pass from Kirk Cousins (Kirk Cousins–Justin Jefferson pass), 1:36. Buccaneers 23–14. **Drive: 15 plays, 75 yards, 8:33.**

**Fourth quarter**

- TB – Ryan Succop 48-yard field goal, 5:16. Buccaneers 26–14. **Drive: 8 plays, 34 yards, 3:44.**

**Top passers**

- MIN – Kirk Cousins – 24/37, 225 yards, TD
- TB – Tom Brady – 15/23, 196 yards, 2 TD

**Top rushers**

- MIN – Dalvin Cook – 22 rushes, 102 yards, TD
- TB – Ronald Jones II – 18 rushes, 80 yards, TD

**Top receivers**

- MIN – Irv Smith Jr. – 4 receptions, 63 yards, TD
- TB – Mike Evans – 3 receptions, 56 yards

==== Week 15: vs. Chicago Bears ====
Week 15: Chicago Bears at Minnesota Vikings – Game summary

Quarter	1	2	3	4	Total
**Bears**	10	10	7	6	**33**
Vikings	7	3	10	7	**27**

at U.S. Bank Stadium, Minneapolis, Minnesota

- Date: December 20
- Game time: 12:00 pm. CST
- Game weather: None (indoor stadium)
- Game attendance: 0
- Referee: Shawn Smith (14)
- TV announcers (Fox): Chris Myers, Greg Jennings and Jen Hale
- Recap, Game Book

Game information

**First quarter**

- CHI – Darnell Mooney 8-yard pass from Mitchell Trubisky (Cairo Santos kick), 9:01. Bears 7–0. **Drive: 5 plays, 58 yards, 2:07.**
- MIN – Adam Thielen 3-yard pass from Kirk Cousins (Dan Bailey kick), 4:46. Tied 7–7. **Drive: 8 plays, 75 yards, 4:15.**
- CHI – Cairo Santos 42-yard field goal, 1:16. Bears 10–7. **Drive: 8 plays, 51 yards, 3:30.**

**Second quarter**

- CHI – David Montgomery 1-yard run (Cairo Santos kick), 6:46. Bears 17–7. **Drive: 13 plays, 76 yards, 7:19.**
- CHI – Cairo Santos 35-yard field goal, 3:34. Bears 20–7. **Drive: 6 plays, 17 yards, 2:13.**
- MIN – Dan Bailey 24-yard field goal, 0:26. Bears 20–10. **Drive: 12 plays, 69 yards, 3:08.**

**Third quarter**

- MIN – Dalvin Cook 1-yard run (Dan Bailey kick), 10:54. Bears 20–17. **Drive: 8 plays, 75 yards, 4:06.**
- CHI – David Montgomery 14-yard run (Cairo Santos kick), 5:30. Bears 27–17. **Drive: 11 plays, 75 yards, 5:24.**
- MIN – Dan Bailey 22-yard field goal, 2:38. Bears 27–20. **Drive: 7 plays, 71 yards, 2:52.**

**Fourth quarter**

- CHI – Cairo Santos 48-yard field goal, 13:33. Bears 30–20. **Drive: 8 plays, 42 yards, 4:05.**
- MIN – Tyler Conklin 20-yard pass from Kirk Cousins (Dan Bailey kick), 8:05. Bears 30–27. **Drive: 11 plays, 75 yards, 5:28.**
- CHI – Cairo Santos 42-yard field goal, 0:56. Bears 33–27. **Drive: 4 plays, 5 yards, 0:58.**

**Top passers**

- CHI – Mitchell Trubisky – 15/21, 202 yards, TD, INT
- MIN – Kirk Cousins – 24/35, 271 yards, 2 TD, INT

**Top rushers**

- CHI – David Montgomery – 32 rushes, 146 yards, 2 TD
- MIN – Dalvin Cook – 24 rushes, 132 yards, TD

**Top receivers**

- CHI – Allen Robinson – 4 receptions, 83 yards
- MIN – Justin Jefferson – 8 receptions, 104 yards

==== Week 16: at New Orleans Saints ====
Week 16: Minnesota Vikings at New Orleans Saints – Game summary

Quarter	1	2	3	4	Total
Vikings	7	7	13	6	**33**
**Saints**	14	10	7	21	**52**

at Mercedes-Benz Superdome, New Orleans, Louisiana

- Date: December 25
- Game time: 3:30 pm. CST
- Game weather: None (indoor stadium)
- Game attendance: 3,000
- Referee: Adrian Hill (29)
- TV announcers (Fox/NFLN/Amazon Prime Video): Joe Buck, Troy Aikman, Erin Andrews and Kristina Pink
- Recap, Game Book

Game information

**First quarter**

- NO – Alvin Kamara 40-yard run (Wil Lutz kick), 12:11. Saints 7–0. **Drive: 6 plays, 75 yards, 2:49.**
- MIN – Dalvin Cook 15-yard run (Dan Bailey kick), 8:46. Tied 7–7. **Drive: 8 plays, 75 yards, 3:25.**
- NO – Alvin Kamara 1-yard run (Wil Lutz kick), 5:10. Saints 14–7. **Drive: 7 plays, 66 yards, 3:36.**

**Second quarter**

- NO – Wil Lutz 30-yard field goal, 14:12. Saints 17–7. **Drive: 10 plays, 84 yards, 4:36.**
- MIN – Mike Boone 4-yard run (Dan Bailey kick), 10:14. Saints 17–14. **Drive: 8 plays, 75 yards, 3:58.**
- NO – Alvin Kamara 5-yard run (Wil Lutz kick), 0:38. Saints 24–14. **Drive: 7 plays, 46 yards, 2:37.**

**Third quarter**

- MIN – Irv Smith Jr. 2-yard pass from Kirk Cousins (kick failed, wide left), 9:41. Saints 24–20. **Drive: 3 plays, 18 yards, 1:12.**
- NO – Alvin Kamara 6-yard run (Wil Lutz kick), 4:38. Saints 31–20. **Drive: 10 plays, 47 yards, 5:03.**
- MIN – Irv Smith Jr. 4-yard pass from Kirk Cousins (Dan Bailey kick), 0:22. Saints 31–27. **Drive: 9 plays, 75 yards, 4:16.**

**Fourth quarter**

- NO – Alvin Kamara 7-yard run (Wil Lutz kick), 12:01. Saints 38–27. **Drive: 7 plays, 67 yards, 3:21.**
- NO – Taysom Hill 1-yard run (Wil Lutz kick), 4:00. Saints 45–27. **Drive: 10 plays, 58 yards, 6:22.**
- MIN – Adam Thielen 1-yard pass from Kirk Cousins (pass failed), 2:10. Saints 45–33. **Drive: 9 plays, 75 yards, 1:50.**
- NO – Alvin Kamara 3-yard run (Wil Lutz kick), 1:50. Saints 52–33. **Drive: 3 plays, 48 yards, 0:20.**

**Top passers**

- MIN – Kirk Cousins – 27/41, 291 yards, 3 TD
- NO – Drew Brees – 19/26, 311 yards, 2 INT

**Top rushers**

- MIN – Dalvin Cook – 15 rushes, 73 yards, TD
- NO – Alvin Kamara – 22 rushes, 155 yards, 6 TD

**Top receivers**

- MIN – Adam Thielen – 8 receptions, 97 yards, TD
- NO – Emmanuel Sanders – 4 receptions, 83 yards

With the loss, Minnesota was eliminated from the playoffs, clinching their first losing season since 2014 and only the second under head coach Mike Zimmer.

==== Week 17: at Detroit Lions ====
Week 17: Minnesota Vikings at Detroit Lions – Game summary

Quarter	1	2	3	4	Total
**Vikings**	7	14	10	6	**37**
Lions	6	10	13	6	**35**

at Ford Field, Detroit, Michigan

- Date: January 3, 2021
- Game time: 12:00 pm. CST/1:00 pm. EST
- Game weather: None (indoor stadium)
- Game attendance: 0
- Referee: Adrian Hill (29)
- TV announcers (Fox): Joe Davis, Robert Smith and Kristina Pink
- Recap, Game Book

Game information

**First quarter**

- DET – Marvin Jones 43-yard pass from Matthew Stafford (kick failed, wide left), 4:45. Lions 6–0. **Drive: 7 plays, 90 yards, 3:36.**
- MIN – Alexander Mattison 28-yard pass from Kirk Cousins (Dan Bailey kick), 0:34. Vikings 7–6. **Drive: 8 plays, 70 yards, 4:11.**

**Second quarter**

- DET – Quintez Cephus 20-yard pass from Matthew Stafford (Matt Prater kick), 13:19. Lions 13–7. **Drive: 5 plays, 75 yards, 2:15.**
- MIN – Ameer Abdullah 4-yard pass from Kirk Cousins (Dan Bailey kick), 8:51. Vikings 14–13. **Drive: 8 plays, 79 yards, 4:28.**
- DET – Matt Prater 54-yard field goal, 7:13. Lions 16–14. **Drive: 5 plays, 39 yards, 1:38.**
- MIN – Chad Beebe 40-yard pass from Kirk Cousins (Dan Bailey kick), 0:04. Vikings 21–16. **Drive: 6 plays, 79 yards, 0:51.**

**Third quarter**

- DET – Marvin Jones 26-yard pass from Matthew Stafford (Matt Prater kick), 14:09. Lions 23–21. **Drive: 2 plays, 33 yards, 0:51.**
- MIN – Alexander Mattison 2-yard run (Dan Bailey kick), 11:35. Vikings 28–23. **Drive: 6 plays, 69 yards, 2:34.**
- MIN – Dan Bailey 23-yard field goal, 7:55. Vikings 31–23. **Drive: 6 plays, 19 yards, 1:46.**
- DET – Adrian Peterson 2-yard run (pass failed), 3:02. Vikings 31–29. **Drive: 10 plays, 75 yards, 4:53.**

**Fourth quarter**

- MIN – Kirk Cousins 1-yard run (kick failed), 10:32. Vikings 37–29. **Drive: 14 plays, 75 yards, 7:30.**
- DET – D'Andre Swift 2-yard run (pass failed), 4:26. Vikings 37–35. **Drive: 14 plays, 75 yards, 6:06.**

**Top passers**

- MIN – Kirk Cousins – 28/40, 405 yards, 3 TD
- DET – Matthew Stafford – 20/31, 293 yards, 3 TD, INT

**Top rushers**

- MIN – Alexander Mattison – 21 rushes, 95 yards, TD
- DET – Adrian Peterson – 7 rushes, 63 yards, TD

**Top receivers**

- MIN – Justin Jefferson – 9 receptions, 133 yards
- DET – Marvin Jones – 8 receptions, 180 yards, 2 TD

=== Standings ===
==== Division ====
NFC North
	W	L	T	PCT	DIV	CONF	PF	PA	STK
^{(1)} Green Bay Packers	13	3	0	.813	5–1	10–2	509	369	W6
^{(7)} Chicago Bears	8	8	0	.500	2–4	6–6	372	370	L1
Minnesota Vikings	7	9	0	.438	4–2	5–7	430	475	W1
Detroit Lions	5	11	0	.313	1–5	4–8	377	519	L4

==== Conference ====
NFC
#	Team	Division	W	L	T	PCT	DIV	CONF	SOS	SOV	STK
**Division leaders**
1	Green Bay Packers	North	13	3	0	.813	5–1	10–2	.428	.387	W6
2 (Note: New Orleans finished ahead of Seattle based on conference record.)	New Orleans Saints	South	12	4	0	.750	6–0	10–2	.459	.406	W2
3	Seattle Seahawks	West	12	4	0	.750	4–2	9–3	.447	.404	W4
4	Washington Football Team	East	7	9	0	.438	4–2	5–7	.459	.388	W1
**Wild cards**
5	Tampa Bay Buccaneers	South	11	5	0	.688	4–2	8–4	.488	.392	W4
6	Los Angeles Rams	West	10	6	0	.625	3–3	9–3	.494	.484	W1
7 (Note: Chicago finished and clinched the 7th and final playoff spot ahead of Arizona based on better win percentage in common games (against Detroit, the NY Giants, Carolina, and the LA Rams, Chicago finished 3–2, while Arizona finished 1–4).)	Chicago Bears	North	8	8	0	.500	2–4	6–6	.488	.336	L1
**Did not qualify for the postseason**
8	Arizona Cardinals	West	8	8	0	.500	2–4	6–6	.475	.441	L2
9	Minnesota Vikings	North	7	9	0	.438	4–2	5–7	.504	.366	W1
10 (Note: San Francisco finished ahead of the NY Giants based on head-to-head victory. Division tie break was initially used to eliminate Dallas (see below).)	San Francisco 49ers	West	6	10	0	.375	3–3	4–8	.549	.448	L1
11 (Note: NY Giants won tiebreaker over Dallas based on division record.)	New York Giants	East	6	10	0	.375	4–2	5–7	.502	.427	W1
12	Dallas Cowboys	East	6	10	0	.375	2–4	5–7	.471	.333	L1
13 (Note: Carolina finished ahead of Detroit based on head-to-head victory.)	Carolina Panthers	South	5	11	0	.313	1–5	4–8	.531	.388	L1
14	Detroit Lions	North	5	11	0	.313	1–5	4–8	.508	.350	L4
15	Philadelphia Eagles	East	4	11	1	.281	2–4	4–8	.537	.469	L3
16	Atlanta Falcons	South	4	12	0	.250	1–5	2–10	.551	.391	L5
**Tiebreakers** (Note: When breaking ties for three or more teams under the NFL's rules, they are first broken within divisions, then comparing only the highest-ranked remaining team from each division.)

== Statistics ==
=== Team leaders ===
Category	Player(s)	Total
Passing yards	Kirk Cousins	4,265
Passing touchdowns	Kirk Cousins	35
Rushing yards	Dalvin Cook	1,557
**Rushing touchdowns**	**Dalvin Cook**	**16 (tie)**
Receptions	Justin Jefferson	88 *
Receiving yards	Justin Jefferson	1,400 **
Receiving touchdowns	Adam Thielen	14
Points	Dalvin Cook	108
Kickoff return yards	Ameer Abdullah	352
Punt return yards	Chad Beebe	42
Tackles	Eric Wilson	122
Sacks	Yannick Ngakoue	5.0
Interceptions	Harrison Smith	5
Forced fumbles	Yannick Ngakoue	2
**Bold** = League leader
* = Franchise Rookie Record
** = NFL Rookie Record

Source: Minnesota Vikings' official website

=== League rankings ===
Category	Total yards	Yards per game	NFL rank (out of 32)
Passing offense	2,059	228.8	22nd
Rushing offense	1,382	153.6	5th
Total offense	3,441	382.4	9th
Passing defense	2,411	267.9	27th
Rushing defense	1,041	115.7	15th
Total defense	3,452	383.6	24th

Source: NFL.com

== Pro Bowl ==
Two Vikings players—running back Dalvin Cook and rookie wide receiver Justin Jefferson—were selected for the 2021 Pro Bowl, the team's lowest contribution to the event since 2014, when they had no Pro Bowlers. Cook received the most votes among NFC running backs to go to his second Pro Bowl (after his rookie season in 2017), and only Russell Wilson received more votes out of any position in the NFC team, while Jefferson was the Vikings' first rookie wide receiver to be selected since Percy Harvin in 2009.
