= Josh Metellus =

American football player (born 1998)

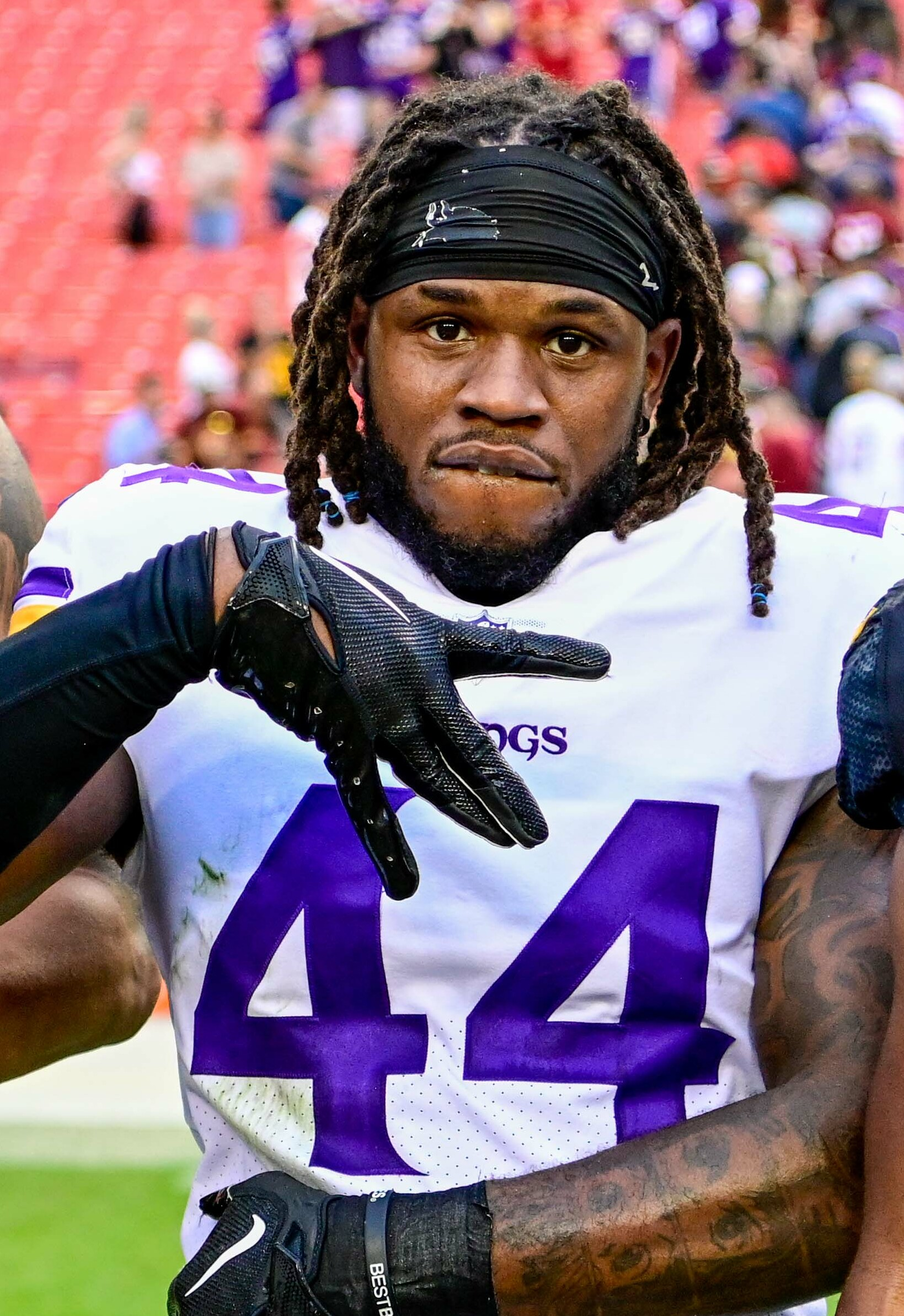
- Metellus with the Minnesota Vikings in 2022

No. 44 – Minnesota Vikings
- Position: Safety
- Roster status: Active

Personal information
- Born: January 21, 1998 (age 28); North Miami Beach, Florida, U.S.
- Listed height: 5 ft 11 in (1.80 m)
- Listed weight: 208 lb (94 kg)

Career information
- High school: Charles W. Flanagan (Pembroke Pines, Florida)
- College: Michigan (2016–2019)
- NFL draft: 2020: 6th round, 205th overall pick

Career history
- Minnesota Vikings (2020–present)

Awards and highlights
- Second-team All-Big Ten (2018); Third-team All-Big Ten (2019)

Career NFL statistics as of Week 10, 2026
- Total tackles: 432
- Interceptions: 6
- Pass deflections: 26
- Forced fumbles: 5
- Fumble recoveries: 3
- Sacks: 3.5
- Stats at Pro Football Reference

Joshua Metellus (born January 21, 1998) is an American professional football utility player for the Minnesota Vikings of the National Football League (NFL). He is currently listed as a safety. He played college football for the Michigan Wolverines, where he was twice named an All-Big Ten selection. He was selected by the Vikings in the 2020 NFL draft.

== College career ==
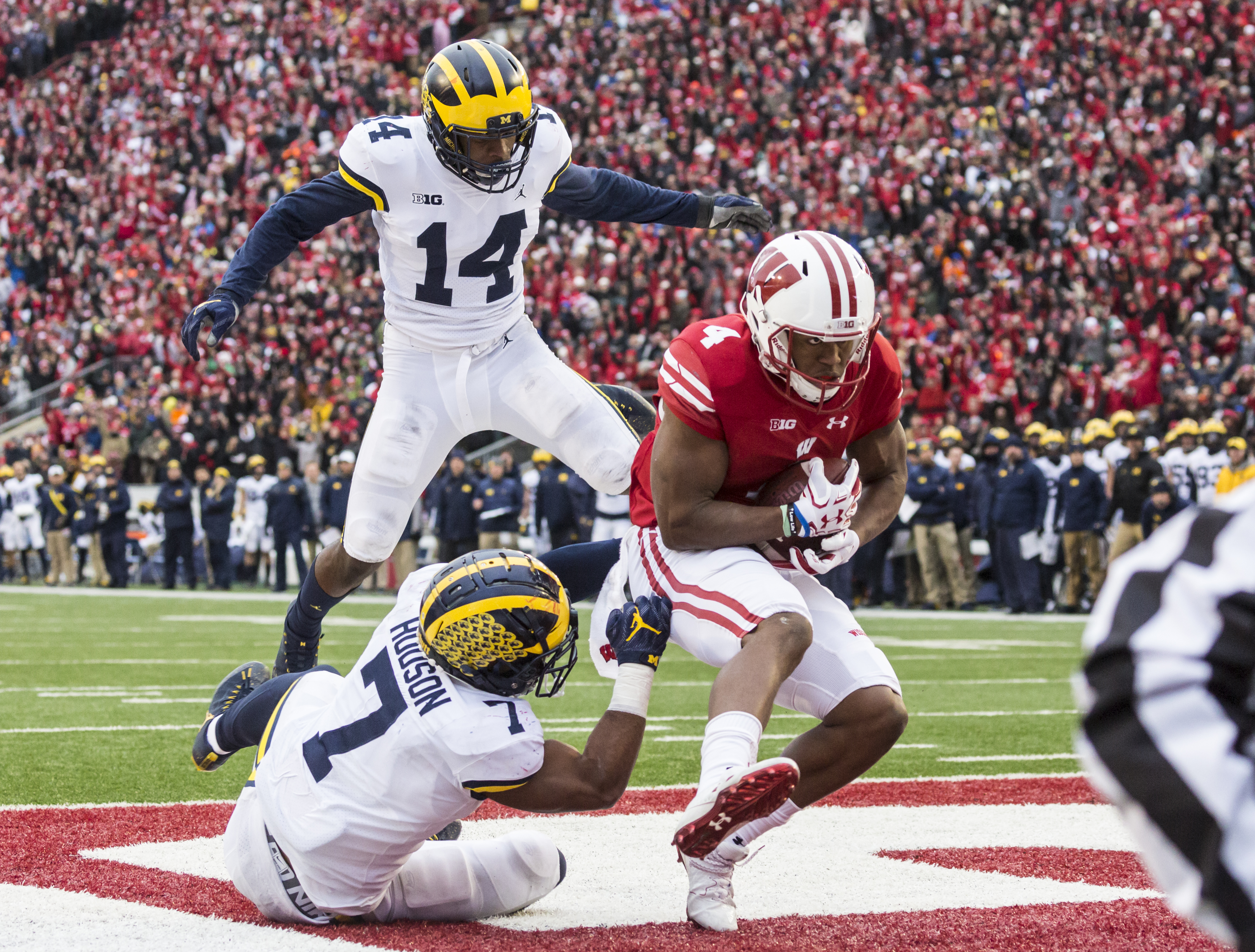
Metellus (#14) playing for Michigan in 2017.

After playing at Charles W. Flanagan High School, Metellus committed to Michigan on June 17, 2015, choosing the Wolverines over Colorado, Florida International, Middle Tennessee State and others. He had previously committed to Georgia Southern, but switched to Michigan after attending an affiliate camp, and Flanagan teammate Devin Bush Jr. later signed with Michigan as well.

Metellus saw some action as a backup during his true freshman season at Michigan, and garnered honorable mention all-Big Ten Conference during his sophomore season on the strength of three games started.

After practicing at both free safety and strong safety in the spring, his senior season included duties as an edge cover in the running game and a roaming safety in the passing game. Metellus was named a team captain his senior season, and participated in the 2020 Senior Bowl and 2020 NFL Combine.

== Professional career ==
At the NFL Combine, Metellus' 20 reps of 225 pounds on the bench press, ranked fourth-most among safeties. In the vertical jump, his performance of 36.5 inches ranked sixth, and he tied for 10th in the broad jump with a mark of 10 feet, 4 inches. His time of 4.55 seconds in the 40-yard dash ranked 11th amongst his position group.

Pre-draft measurables
Height	Weight	Arm length	Hand span	Wingspan	40-yard dash	10-yard split	20-yard split	20-yard shuttle	Three-cone drill	Vertical jump	Broad jump	Bench press
5 ft 11 in (1.80 m)	209 lb (95 kg)	32 1/4 in (0.82 m)	10 1/4 in (0.26 m)	6 ft 3 5/8 in (1.92 m)	4.55 s	1.54 s	2.66 s	4.40 s	6.94 s	36.5 in (0.93 m)	10 ft 4 in (3.15 m)	20 reps
All values from NFL Combine

The Minnesota Vikings selected Metellus in the sixth round (205th overall) of the 2020 NFL draft. He was the 17th safety drafted in 2020 and was one of many 2020 sixth or seventh round safeties that successfully became starters, including Alohi Gilman, Jordan Fuller, Kamren Curl, and Geno Stone.

"Metellus might not have the high-end athletic traits that will earn him a starting role in camp, but if he gets into an NFL game, he might not give the job back, showing the toughness required for downhill work and just enough range on the back end."

— Dane Brugler, The Athletic

On July 23, 2020, the Minnesota Vikings signed Metellus to a four–year, $3.45 million contract that includes an initial signing bonus of $160,265.

Throughout training camp, Metellus competed against Brian Cole II for a roster spot as a backup safety. On September 5, 2020, the Minnesota Vikings waived him as part of their final roster cuts and signed him to the practice squad the next day. He was promoted to the active roster on September 18, 2020.

Metellus made his first career start in Week 3 of the 2022 season against the Detroit Lions, where he recorded his first career interception off Jared Goff in the final seconds of the fourth quarter in the 28–24 win.

On September 7, 2023, the Minnesota Vikings signed Mettelus to a two–year, $8.00 million contract extension that includes $5.13 million guaranteed upon signing and an initial signing bonus of $3.00 million. During the 2023 season, Metellus became notable for his versatility within Brian Flores' defense, playing in twelve different defensive positions through Week 14.

During the 2024 season, Metellus and teammate Camryn Bynum became known for their choreographed celebrations following defensive turnovers, which included references to movies such as The Parent Trap, White Chicks, and High School Musical. Metellus and Bynum combined for five interceptions on the season.

On July 26, 2025, Metellus signed a three-year, $36 million contract extension with the Vikings. He started 14 games for Minnesota, recording two interceptions, six pass deflections, 0.5 sacks, and 86 combined tackles. On December 17, it was announced that Metellus would require season-ending shoulder surgery.

== NFL career statistics ==
Legend
	Led the league
**Bold**	Career high

=== Regular season ===
Year	Team	Games		Tackles					Interceptions						Fumbles				
Year	Team	GP	GS	Cmb	Solo	Ast	Sck	TFL	Int	Yds	Avg	Lng	TD	PD	FF	Fmb	FR	Yds	TD
2020	MIN	15	0	9	8	1	0.0	0	0	0	0.0	0	0	0	0	0	**2**	0	0
2021	MIN	16	0	13	8	5	0.0	0	0	0	0.0	0	0	1	0	0	0	0	0
2022	MIN	17	3	42	32	10	0.0	1	1	0	0.0	0	0	5	0	0	0	0	0
2023	MIN	17	17	**116**	**78**	38	**2.5**	**7**	1	**43**	**43.0**	**43**	0	5	**4**	0	1	0	0
2024	MIN	17	10	103	63	40	0.0	2	**2**	16	8.0	12	0	5	1	0	0	0	0
2025	MIN	14	14	86	42	**44**	0.5	1	**2**	0	0.0	0	0	**6**	0	0	0	0	0
Career		96	44	369	231	138	3.0	11	6	59	9.8	43	0	22	5	0	3	0	0

=== Postseason ===
Year	Team	Games		Tackles					Interceptions						Fumbles				
Year	Team	GP	GS	Cmb	Solo	Ast	Sck	TFL	Int	Yds	Avg	Lng	TD	PD	FF	Fmb	FR	Yds	TD
2022	MIN	1	0	1	1	0	0.0	0	0	0	0.0	0	0	0	**1**	0	0	0	0
2024	MIN	1	1	**3**	**2**	**1**	0.0	0	0	0	0.0	0	0	0	0	0	0	0	0
Career		2	1	4	3	1	0.0	0	0	0	0.0	0	0	0	1	0	0	0	0

== Personal life ==
Metellus's wife Haley gave birth to their first son, Joshua Syx, in April 2021, and have openly discussed the complications faced during his birth and Haley’s subsequent postpartum depression. The couple had a second child, a daughter, in March 2025.
