= Harrison Hand =

American football player (born 1998)

Profile
- Position: Cornerback

Personal information
- Born: November 12, 1998 (age 27); Cherry Hill, New Jersey, U.S.
- Listed height: 5 ft 11 in (1.80 m)
- Listed weight: 185 lb (84 kg)

Career information
- High school: Cherry Hill West
- College: Baylor (2017–2018); Temple (2019)
- NFL draft: 2020: 5th round, 169th overall pick

Career history
- Minnesota Vikings (2020–2021); New York Giants (2022)*; Chicago Bears (2022); Atlanta Falcons (2024); Los Angeles Chargers (2025)*
- * Offseason or practice squad member only

Career NFL statistics as of 2024
- Total tackles: 34
- Pass deflections: 4
- Interceptions: 1
- Forced fumbles: 1
- Stats at Pro Football Reference

Harrison Hand (born November 12, 1998) is an American professional football cornerback. He played college football for the Temple Owls, before being selected by the Minnesota Vikings in the fifth round of the 2020 draft.

== College career ==
Hand played football at Baylor for three years before transferring to Temple. In 2019, he had three interceptions. He skipped the bowl game to prepare for the NFL draft.

== Professional career ==
Pre-draft measurables
Height	Weight	Arm length	Hand span	40-yard dash	10-yard split	20-yard split	20-yard shuttle	Three-cone drill	Vertical jump	Broad jump	Bench press
5 ft 11 1/8 in (1.81 m)	197 lb (89 kg)	31 3/4 in (0.81 m)	9 1/8 in (0.23 m)	4.52 s	1.49 s	2.61 s	4.27 s	7.15 s	41.0 in (1.04 m)	11 ft 1 in (3.38 m)	14 reps
All values from NFL Combine

=== Minnesota Vikings ===
Hand was selected by the Minnesota Vikings with the 169th pick in the fifth round of the 2020 NFL draft. In Week 16 against the New Orleans Saints on Christmas Day, Hand recorded his first career interception off a pass thrown by Drew Brees during the 52–33 loss.

Hand was waived on August 23, 2022.

=== New York Giants ===
On August 24, 2022, Hand was claimed off waivers by the New York Giants. He was waived on August 30, 2022, and signed to the practice squad the next day. He was released on September 5.

=== Chicago Bears ===
On September 13, 2022, Hand was signed to the Chicago Bears practice squad. He was promoted to the active roster on December 22. He was released on April 24, 2023.

=== Atlanta Falcons ===
On June 11, 2024, Hand signed with the Atlanta Falcons. He was placed on injured reserve on August 11.

=== Los Angeles Chargers ===
On August 14, 2025, Hand signed with the Los Angeles Chargers. He was waived on August 26 and re-signed to the practice squad the next day, but released shortly after.

== Personal life ==
Hand is the cousin of former NFL defensive end Turk McBride and safety Antwine Perez.
