= Kyle Hinton =

American football player (born 1998)

No. 68 – Atlanta Falcons
- Position: Guard
- Roster status: Active

Personal information
- Born: February 27, 1998 (age 28); Peoria, Arizona, U.S.
- Listed height: 6 ft 2 in (1.88 m)
- Listed weight: 315 lb (143 kg)

Career information
- High school: Liberty (Peoria)
- College: Washburn (2016–2019)
- NFL draft: 2020: 7th round, 253rd overall pick

Career history
- Minnesota Vikings (2020–2022); Atlanta Falcons (2023–present)

Career NFL statistics as of Week 5, 2026
- Games played: 57
- Games started: 3
- Stats at Pro Football Reference

Kyle Hinton (born February 27, 1998) is an American professional football guard for the Atlanta Falcons of the National Football League (NFL). He played college football for the Washburn Ichabods. He was selected by the Vikings in the seventh round of the 2020 NFL draft.

== College career ==
As a senior at Washburn, Hinton received first-team All-American honors from d2football.com and was a second-team All-American according to the American Football Coaches Association and the Hansen Football Committee. He was a second all-region selection from the D2CCA and the Hansen Football Committee as well as a first-team all-Mid-America Intercollegiate Athletics Association selection. Hinton made his first catch of his career on an 8-yard touchdown pass in the Ichabods’ 57–41 win against Nebraska–Kearney during the season finale.

== Professional career ==
Pre-draft measurables
Height	Weight	Arm length	Hand span	Wingspan	40-yard dash	10-yard split	20-yard split	20-yard shuttle	Three-cone drill	Vertical jump	Broad jump	Bench press
6 ft 2 1/8 in (1.88 m)	295 lb (134 kg)	32 1/2 in (0.83 m)	9 1/4 in (0.23 m)	6 ft 7 3/4 in (2.03 m)	4.88 s	1.71 s	2.81 s	4.66 s	7.70 s	34.5 in (0.88 m)	10 ft 1 in (3.07 m)	34 reps
All values from Pro Day

=== Minnesota Vikings ===
Hinton was selected by the Minnesota Vikings with the 253rd pick in the seventh round of the 2020 NFL draft. He was waived by the Vikings during final roster cuts on September 5, 2020, and signed to the practice squad the next day. On December 29, 2020, Hinton was promoted to the active roster.

On August 31, 2021, Hinton was waived by the Vikings and re-signed to the practice squad the next day. He signed a reserve/future contract with the Vikings on January 12, 2022.

Hinton was waived on August 30, 2022. He was re-signed to the practice squad one day later.

=== Atlanta Falcons ===
On January 18, 2023, Hinton signed a reserve/future contract with the Atlanta Falcons.
