= Jake Bargas =

American football player (born 1996)

No. 34
- Position: Fullback

Personal information
- Born: November 28, 1996 (age 29); Boca Raton, Florida, U.S.
- Listed height: 6 ft 2 in (1.88 m)
- Listed weight: 245 lb (111 kg)

Career information
- College: North Carolina
- NFL draft: 2020: undrafted

Career history
- Minnesota Vikings (2020–2021); Chicago Bears (2022)*; Miami Dolphins (2022)*; New Orleans Saints (2023)*
- * Offseason or practice squad member only

Career NFL statistics
- Games played: 2
- Stats at Pro Football Reference

Jake Bargas (born November 28, 1996) is an American former professional football player who was a fullback in the National Football League (NFL). After playing college football for the North Carolina Tar Heels, he signed with the Minnesota Vikings as an undrafted free agent in 2020.

== Professional career ==
Pre-draft measurables
Height	Weight
6 ft 2 1/8 in (1.88 m)	250 lb (113 kg)
Values from Pro Day

=== Minnesota Vikings ===
Bargas signed with the Minnesota Vikings as an undrafted free agent following the 2020 NFL draft on April 27, 2020. He was waived during final roster cuts on September 5, and signed to the team's practice squad the next day. He was elevated to the active roster on December 24 for the team's week 16 game against the New Orleans Saints, and reverted to the practice squad after the game. He signed a reserve/future contract with the Vikings after the season on January 4, 2021.

On August 31, 2021, Bargas was waived by the Vikings and re-signed to the practice squad the next day.

On May 2, 2022, Bargas re-signed with the Vikings. He was released by Minnesota on August 16.

=== Chicago Bears ===
On August 21, 2022, Bargas signed with the Chicago Bears. He was waived on August 23.

=== Miami Dolphins ===
On November 8, 2022, Bargas was signed to the Miami Dolphins practice squad.

=== New Orleans Saints ===
On May 31, 2023, Bargas signed with the New Orleans Saints. He was waived by New Orleans on August 29.
