= Brian Cole II =

American gridiron football player (born 1997)

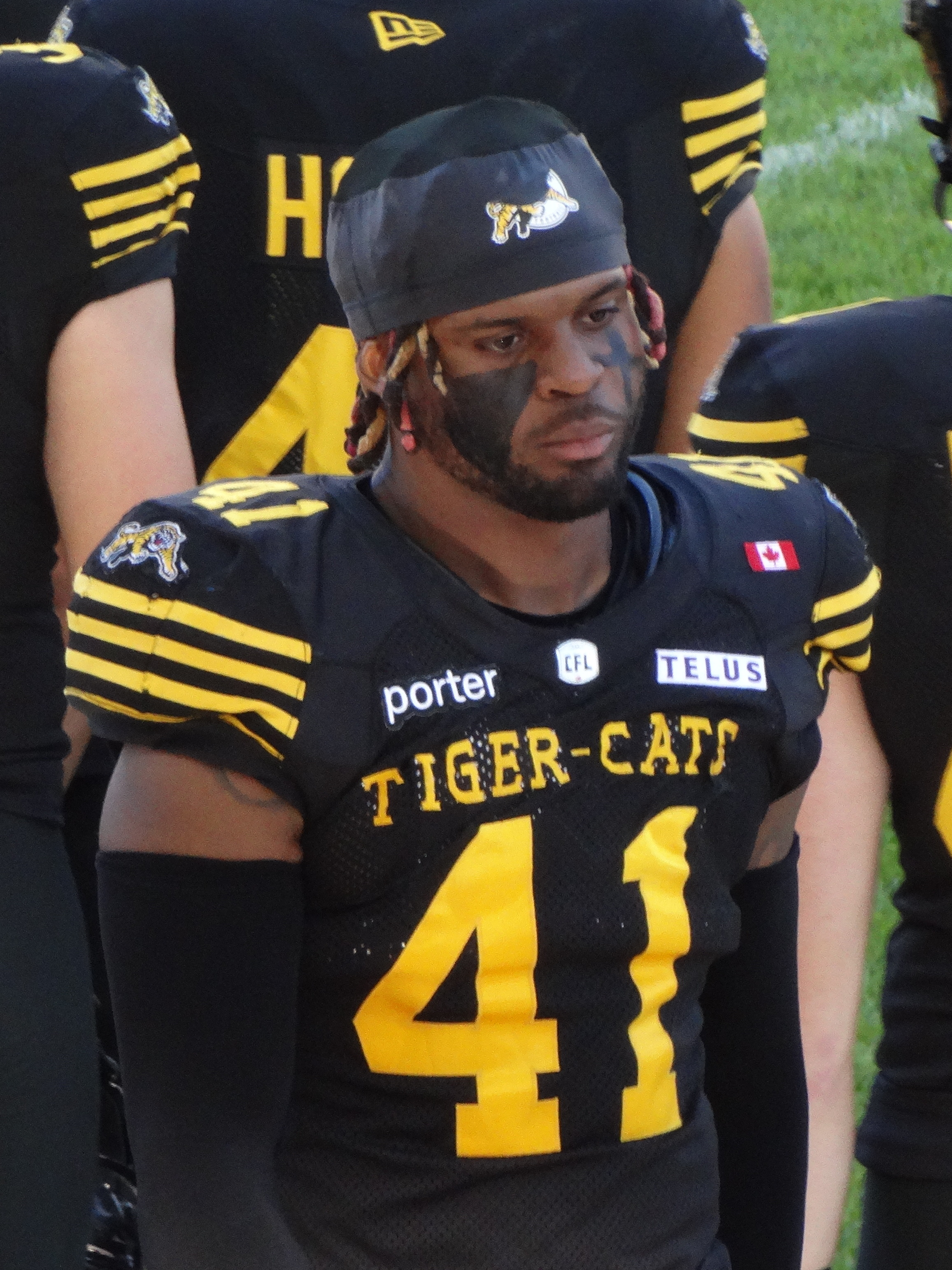
- Cole with the Hamilton Tiger-Cats in 2025

Ottawa Redblacks
- Position: Linebacker
- Roster status: Active
- CFL status: American

Personal information
- Born: April 3, 1997 (age 29); Saginaw, Michigan, U.S.
- Listed height: 6 ft 2 in (1.88 m)
- Listed weight: 215 lb (98 kg)

Career information
- High school: Heritage (Saginaw)
- College: Michigan (2015); East Mississippi CC (2016); Mississippi State (2017–2019)
- NFL draft: 2020: 7th round, 249th overall pick

Career history
- Minnesota Vikings (2020)*; Miami Dolphins (2020–2021)*; Carolina Panthers (2021)*; Saskatchewan Roughriders (2022)*; Edmonton Elks (2022)*; Winnipeg Blue Bombers (2022–2024); Hamilton Tiger-Cats (2025); Ottawa Redblacks (2026–present)
- * Offseason or practice squad member only
- Stats at Pro Football Reference
- Stats at CFL.ca

Brian Keith Cole II (born April 3, 1997) is an American professional football linebacker for the Ottawa Redblacks of the Canadian Football League (CFL). He played college football at Mississippi State.

== College career ==
Cole grew up in Saginaw, Michigan, and played three games at Michigan as a wide receiver and on special teams. He was released from the team in January 2016. Cole transferred to East Mississippi Community College and switched to defense, compiling 54 tackles, with 3 forced fumbles, 3 blocked kicks, a sack, and a fumble returned for a touchdown. He came to Mississippi State and sat out a season as an academic redshirt. During his junior season, he played five games before a torn pectoral muscle ended his season after five games As a senior in 2019, Cole tallied 67 tackles, 7.5 tackles for loss, 2 sacks, 2 pass breakups, and one interception.

== Professional career ==
Pre-draft measurables
Height	Weight	Arm length	Hand span	Wingspan	40-yard dash	10-yard split	20-yard split
6 ft 1 3/4 in (1.87 m)	213 lb (97 kg)	31 3/8 in (0.80 m)	10 in (0.25 m)	6 ft 3 3/4 in (1.92 m)	4.52 s	1.56 s	2.66 s
All values from NFL Combine

=== Minnesota Vikings ===
Cole was selected by the Minnesota Vikings in the seventh round with the 249th pick of the 2020 NFL draft. He was placed on the reserve/COVID-19 list by the Vikings on July 27, 2020, and activated from the list on eight days later. He was waived on August 26, 2020.

=== Miami Dolphins ===
On September 7, 2020, Cole was signed to the practice squad of the Miami Dolphins. He signed a reserve/future contract with the Dolphins on January 5, 2021. He was waived on July 16, 2021.

=== Carolina Panthers ===
On August 5, 2021, Cole was signed by the Carolina Panthers. He was waived on August 27, 2021.

=== Saskatchewan Roughriders ===
Cole was signed by the Saskatchewan Roughriders on February 2, 2022, but was released with the final training camp cuts on June 5, 2022.

=== Edmonton Elks ===
Cole was added to the practice roster of the Edmonton Elks on June 28, 2022. However, he was released from the practice roster on July 10, 2022.

=== Winnipeg Blue Bombers ===
On July 13, 2022, Cole signed a practice roster agreement with the Winnipeg Blue Bombers. He played in 37 games over three seasons with the Blue Bombers where he recorded 27 defensive tackles, 24 special teams tackles, one interception, and four forced fumbles. He became a free agent on February 11, 2025.

=== Hamilton Tiger-Cats ===
On February 11, 2025, it was announced that Cole had signed with the Hamilton Tiger-Cats. He became a free agent upon the expiry of his contract on February 10, 2026.

=== Ottawa Redblacks ===
On February 10, 2026, it was announced that Cole had signed with the Ottawa Redblacks.
